= 2025 FIFA Arab Cup Group D =

Association football tournament group stage

The Group D of the 2025 FIFA Arab Cup was one of the four groups of competing nations in the 2025 FIFA Arab Cup, taking place from 3 December to 9 December 2025. It consisted of Algeria, Iraq, Bahrain and Sudan.

The top two teams, Algeria and Iraq, advanced to the quarter-finals.

== Teams ==
Draw position	Team	Finals appearance	Last appearance	Previous best performance	FIFA Rankings	
Draw position	Team	Finals appearance	Last appearance	Previous best performance	April 2025 (Note: The rankings of April 2025 were used for seeding for the final draw.)	November 2025
D1	Algeria	4th	2021	Winners (2021)	36	35
D2	Iraq	7th	2021	Winners (1964, 1966, 1985, 1988)	59	58
D3	Bahrain	7th	2021	Runners-up (1985, 2002)	84	91
D4	Sudan	5th	2021	Group stage (1998, 2002, 2012, 2021)	114	118

== Standings ==
Pos	Team	Pld	W	D	L	GF	GA	GD	Pts	Qualification
1	Algeria	3	2	1	0	7	1	+6	7	Advance to knockout stage
2	Iraq	3	2	0	1	4	3	+1	6	Advance to knockout stage
3	Bahrain	3	1	0	2	5	8	−3	3	
4	Sudan	3	0	1	2	1	5	−4	1	

Source: FIFA
Rules for classification: Tiebreakers

In the quarter-finals:

- The winners of Group D, Algeria, advanced to play the runners-up of Group C, the United Arab Emirates.
- The runners-up of Group D, Iraq, advanced to play the winners of Group C, Jordan.

== Matches ==
=== Algeria vs Sudan ===
3 December 2025
15:00

Algeria	0–0	Sudan
	Report

Ahmad bin Ali Stadium, Al Rayyan
Attendance: 37,143
Referee: Amin Omar (Egypt)

Algeria	Sudan

GK	1	Farid Chaâl
RB	12	Réda Halaïmia
CB	19	Achref Abada
CB	5	Abdelkader Bedrane
LB	3	Naoufel Khacef
DM	6	Victor Lekhal
CM	14	Sofiane Bendebka	(yellow card) 29'
CM	10	Yassine Benzia (c)		(substituted off) 65'
RF	9	Adam Ounas	(yellow card) 40' (yellow-red card) 45+4'
CF	18	Redouane Berkane		(substituted off) 65'
LF	7	Adil Boulbina		(substituted off) 79'
Substitutions:
FW	13	Islam Slimani		(substituted on) 65'
DF	20	Youcef Atal		(substituted on) 65'
FW	21	Amir Sayoud		(substituted on) 79'
Manager:
Madjid Bougherra

GK	1	Mohamed El Nour
RB	7	Yaser Awad
CB	3	Mohamed Ering
CB	6	Mustafa Karshoum
LB	19	Ahmed Tabanja
RM	15	Salah Adel
CM	13	Ammar Taifour	(yellow card) 62'	(substituted off) 65'
CM	5	Walieldin Khedr
LM	22	Al-Jezoli Nouh		(substituted off) 83'
AM	8	Abdel Raouf
CF	10	Mohamed Abdelrahman (c)
Substitutions:
FW	9	Yaser Muzmel		(substituted on) 65'
FW	18	Mazen Fadl		(substituted on) 83'
Manager:
(Ghana) James Kwesi Appiah

Player of the Match:
Mohamed El Nour (Sudan)

Assistant referees:
Mahmoud Abouregal (Egypt)
Ahmed Ali (Egypt)
Fourth official:
Cristián Garay (Chile)
Reserve assistant referee:
Claudio Urrutia (Chile)
Video assistant referee:
Fedayi San (Switzerland)
Assistant video assistant referee:
Rodolpho Toski (Brazil)

=== Iraq vs Bahrain ===
3 December 2025
17:30

Iraq	2–1	Bahrain
Lutfalla 10' (o.g.); M. Ali 25'	Report	Hashim 79'

Stadium 974, Doha
Attendance: 9,358
Referee: Pierre Atcho (Gabon)

Iraq	Bahrain

GK	22	Ahmed Basil	(yellow card) 90+2'
RB	3	Mustafa Saadoon	(yellow card) 30'
CB	6	Munaf Younis
CB	5	Akam Hashim		(substituted off) 46'
LB	15	Ahmed Yahya
RM	11	Hasan Abdulkareem		(substituted off) 57'
CM	14	Sajjad Jassim		(substituted off) 57'
CM	20	Zaid Ismail	(yellow card) 65'
LM	17	Ali Jasim
CF	18	Aymen Hussein (c)		(substituted off) 76'
CF	10	Mohanad Ali		(substituted off) 64'
Substitutions:
DF	4	Saad Natiq		(substituted on) 46'
MF	16	Sherko Karim		(substituted on) 57'
MF	8	Amjad Attwan	(yellow card) 90+4'	(substituted on) 57'
MF	19	Karrar Nabeel		(substituted on) 64'
FW	13	Amar Muhsin		(substituted on) 76'
Manager:
(Australia) Graham Arnold

GK	22	Ebrahim Lutfalla		(substituted off) 17'
RB	14	Vincent Emmanuel
CB	2	Amine Benaddi	(yellow card) 35'
CB	3	Waleed Al Hayam
LB	23	Abdulla Al-Khulasi
CM	4	Sayed Dhiya Saeed (c)
CM	10	Kamil Al-Aswad
RW	7	Ali Madan		(substituted off) 69'
AM	8	Mohamed Marhoon
LW	20	Mahdi Al-Humaidan		(substituted off) 59'
CF	13	Mohamed Al-Romaihi		(substituted off) 69'
Substitutions:
GK	1	Omar Salem Rajab		(substituted on) 17'
FW	11	Ebrahim Al-Khattal	(red card) 90+3'	(substituted on) 59'
FW	9	Hashim Sayed Isa		(substituted on) 69'
FW	12	Mahdi Abduljabbar		(substituted on) 69'
Manager:
(Croatia) Dragan Talajić

Player of the Match:
Mohanad Ali (Iraq)

Assistant referees:
Boris Ditsoga (Gabon)
Danek Moutsassi (Congo)
Fourth official:
Glenn Nyberg (Sweden)
Reserve assistant referee:
Mahbod Beigi (Sweden)
Video assistant referee:
Abdullah Al-Shehri (Saudi Arabia)
Assistant video assistant referee:
Khamis Al-Marri (Qatar)

=== Bahrain vs Algeria ===
6 December 2025
16:30

Bahrain	1–5	Algeria
Abduljabbar 27'	Report	Berkane 24', 48'; Boulbina 30', 80'; Benzia 45+7' (pen.)

Khalifa International Stadium, Al Rayyan
Attendance: 20,260
Referee: Campbell-Kirk Kawana-Waugh (New Zealand)

Bahrain	Algeria

GK	1	Omar Salem Rajab
RB	17	Ahmed Bughammar		(substituted off) 70'
CB	2	Amine Benaddi	(yellow card) 45+3'
CB	3	Waleed Al Hayam
LB	23	Abdulla Al-Khulasi
CM	4	Sayed Dhiya Saeed (c)
CM	10	Kamil Al-Aswad
RW	7	Ali Madan		(substituted off) 85'
AM	8	Mohamed Marhoon		(substituted off) 70'
LW	20	Mahdi Al-Humaidan		(substituted off) 56'
CF	12	Mahdi Abduljabbar		(substituted off) 56'
Substitutions:
DF	5	Mahmood Al-Moosawi		(substituted on) 56'
FW	13	Mohamed Al-Romaihi		(substituted on) 56'
DF	18	Mohamed Adel		(substituted on) 70'
FW	9	Hashim Sayed Isa		(substituted on) 70'
MF	15	Jasim Al-Shaikh		(substituted on) 85'
Manager:
(Croatia) Dragan Talajić

GK	1	Farid Chaâl
RB	20	Youcef Atal		(substituted off) 64'
CB	19	Achref Abada
CB	5	Abdelkader Bedrane
LB	2	Houari Baouche
DM	6	Victor Lekhal
CM	14	Sofiane Bendebka		(substituted off) 75'
CM	10	Yassine Benzia
RF	21	Amir Sayoud (c)		(substituted off) 64'
CF	18	Redouane Berkane	(yellow card) 51'	(substituted off) 75'
LF	7	Adil Boulbina		(substituted off) 83'
Substitutions:
DF	12	Réda Halaïmia		(substituted on) 64'
FW	11	Yacine Brahimi		(substituted on) 64'
FW	17	Rafik Guitane		(substituted on) 75'
MF	8	Zakaria Draoui		(substituted on) 75'
FW	13	Islam Slimani		(substituted on) 83'
Manager:
Madjid Bougherra

Player of the Match:
Redouane Berkane (Algeria)

Assistant referees:
Isaac Trevis (New Zealand)
Edward Cook (New Zealand)
Fourth official:
Ismail Elfath (United States)
Reserve assistant referee:
Kyle Atkins (United States)
Video assistant referee:
Jarred Gillett (England)
Assistant video assistant referee:
Jumpei Iida (Japan)

=== Sudan vs Iraq ===
6 December 2025
19:00

Sudan	0–2	Iraq
	Report	M. Ali 81'; Attwan 84'

Stadium 974, Doha
Attendance: 38,639
Referee: Adham Makhadmeh (Jordan)

Sudan	Iraq

GK	1	Mohamed El Nour
RB	7	Yaser Awad	(yellow card) 90+1'
CB	3	Mohamed Ering
CB	6	Mustafa Karshoum
LB	19	Ahmed Tabanja
RM	15	Salah Adel
CM	13	Ammar Taifour		(substituted off) 68'
CM	5	Walieldin Khedr
LM	8	Abdel Raouf		(substituted off) 76'
CF	11	John Mano	(yellow card) 48'	(substituted off) 76'
CF	10	Mohamed Abdelrahman (c)
Substitutions:
FW	9	Yaser Muzmel		(substituted on) 68'
MF	17	Abdelsamad Manen		(substituted on) 76'
FW	22	Al-Jezoli Nouh		(substituted on) 76'
Manager:
(Ghana) James Kwesi Appiah

GK	22	Ahmed Basil (c)
RB	16	Sherko Karim		(substituted off) 58'
CB	2	Maitham Jabbar
CB	5	Akam Hashim
LB	23	Ahmed Maknzi	(yellow card) 86'
RM	11	Hasan Abdulkareem		(substituted off) 81'
CM	19	Karrar Nabeel
CM	20	Zaid Ismail
LM	7	Hussein Ali Al-Saedi		(substituted off) 58'
CF	9	Mohammed Jawad		(substituted off) 74'
CF	13	Amar Muhsin		(substituted off) 58'
Substitutions:
MF	8	Amjad Attwan		(substituted on) 58'
DF	3	Mustafa Saadoon	(yellow card) 59'	(substituted on) 58'
FW	10	Mohanad Ali		(substituted on) 58'
MF	17	Ali Jasim		(substituted on) 74'
DF	15	Ahmed Yahya		(substituted on) 81'
Manager:
(Australia) Graham Arnold

Player of the Match:
Mohanad Ali (Iraq)

Assistant referees:
Mohammad Al-Kalaf (Jordan)
Ahmad Al-Roalle (Jordan)
Fourth official:
Ma Ning (China)
Reserve assistant referee:
Zhang Cheng (China)
Video assistant referee:
Khamis Al-Marri (Qatar)
Assistant video assistant referee:
Allen Chapman (United States)

=== Algeria vs Iraq ===
9 December 2025
20:00

Algeria	2–0	Iraq
Tougai 45+1'; Natiq 46' (o.g.)	Report

Khalifa International Stadium, Al Rayyan
Attendance: 34,148
Referee: Abdulrahman Al-Jassim (Qatar)

Algeria	Iraq

GK	1	Farid Chaâl
RB	20	Youcef Atal		(substituted off) 56'
CB	19	Achref Abada
CB	4	Mohamed Amine Tougai
LB	2	Houari Baouche
DM	6	Victor Lekhal		(substituted off) 67'
CM	8	Zakaria Draoui
CM	10	Yassine Benzia
RF	7	Adil Boulbina		(substituted off) 76'
CF	18	Redouane Berkane		(substituted off) 56'
LF	11	Yacine Brahimi (c)		(substituted off) 56'
Substitutions:
FW	9	Adam Ounas	(yellow card) 90+3'	(substituted on) 56'
FW	13	Islam Slimani		(substituted on) 56'
DF	12	Réda Halaïmia		(substituted on) 56'
MF	15	Houssem Eddine Mrezigue		(substituted on) 67'
FW	17	Rafik Guitane		(substituted on) 76'
Manager:
Madjid Bougherra

GK	1	Fahad Talib
RB	6	Munaf Younis
CB	4	Saad Natiq (c)
CB	2	Maitham Jabbar		(substituted off) 46'
LB	23	Ahmed Maknzi
RM	7	Hussein Ali Al-Saedi	(red card) 5'
CM	14	Sajjad Jassim		(substituted off) 52'
CM	19	Karrar Nabeel
LM	8	Amjad Attwan		(substituted off) 46'
CF	13	Amar Muhsin		(substituted off) 78'
CF	10	Mohanad Ali		(substituted off) 32'
Substitutions:
DF	15	Ahmed Yahya		(substituted on) 32'
MF	17	Ali Jasim		(substituted on) 46'
DF	5	Akam Hashim		(substituted on) 46'
MF	11	Hasan Abdulkareem		(substituted on) 52'
FW	9	Mohammed Jawad		(substituted on) 78'
Manager:
(Australia) Graham Arnold

Player of the Match:
Yacine Brahimi (Algeria)

Assistant referees:
Taleb Al-Marri (Qatar)
Saud Al-Maqaleh (Qatar)
Fourth official:
Amin Omar (Egypt)
Reserve assistant referee:
Mahmoud Abouregal (Egypt)
Video assistant referee:
Sivakorn Pu-udom (Thailand)
Assistant video assistant referee:
Khamis Al-Marri (Qatar)

=== Bahrain vs Sudan ===
9 December 2025
20:00

Bahrain	3–1	Sudan
Abduljabbar 37'; Al-Romaihi 79' (pen.); Al-Humaidan 89'	Report	Muzmel 72'

Education City Stadium, Al Rayyan
Attendance: 21,386
Referee: Juan Gabriel Benítez (Paraguay)

Bahrain	Sudan

GK	21	Mohamed El-Gharably
RB	14	Vincent Emmanuel
CB	5	Mahmood Al-Moosawi
CB	3	Waleed Al Hayam
LB	23	Abdulla Al-Khulasi		(substituted off) 90+2'
DM	4	Sayed Dhiya Saeed (c)	(yellow card) 64'
RM	7	Ali Madan
CM	10	Kamil Al-Aswad
CM	15	Jasim Al-Shaikh	(yellow card) 41'	(substituted off) 74'
LM	8	Mohamed Marhoon		(substituted off) 67'
CF	12	Mahdi Abduljabbar		(substituted off) 74'
Substitutions:
FW	20	Mahdi Al-Humaidan		(substituted on) 67'
FW	9	Hashim Sayed Isa		(substituted on) 74'
FW	13	Mohamed Al-Romaihi		(substituted on) 74'
DF	19	Hazza Ali		(substituted on) 90+2'
Manager:
(Croatia) Dragan Talajić

GK	1	Mohamed El Nour
RB	7	Yaser Awad
CB	3	Mohamed Ering	(yellow card) 21' (red card) 58'
CB	6	Mustafa Karshoum
LB	19	Ahmed Tabanja
RM	9	Yaser Muzmel		(substituted off) 85'
CM	13	Ammar Taifour
CM	5	Walieldin Khedr		(substituted off) 61'
LM	8	Abdel Raouf		(substituted off) 61'
CF	11	John Mano		(substituted off) 80'
CF	10	Mohamed Abdelrahman (c)
Substitutions:
DF	4	Altayeb Abdelrazeg		(substituted on) 61'
MF	15	Salah Adel		(substituted on) 61'
FW	22	Al-Jezoli Nouh		(substituted on) 80'
FW	23	Musa Hussein		(substituted on) 85'
Other disciplinary actions:
TS	—	(Ghana) Ignatius Osei-Fosu	(yellow card) 59'
Manager:
(Ghana) James Kwesi Appiah

Player of the Match:
Abdulla Al-Khulasi (Bahrain)

Assistant referees:
Eduardo Cardozo (Paraguay)
Milcíades Saldívar (Paraguay)
Fourth official:
Juan Gabriel Calderón (Costa Rica)
Reserve assistant referee:
William Arrieta (Costa Rica)
Video assistant referee:
Benjamín Pineda (Costa Rica)
Assistant video assistant referee:
Jumpei Iida (Japan)
