= 27th Arabian Gulf Cup squads =

List of footballers

Below are the squads for the 27th Arabian Gulf Cup, which took place in Saudi Arabia from 23 September to 6 October 2026.

The eight national teams involved in the tournament were required to register a squad with a minimum of 18 players and a maximum of 26 players, at least three of whom had to be goalkeepers. Only players in these squads were eligible to take part in the tournament.

The age listed for each player is as of 23 September 2026, the first day of the tournament. The numbers of caps and goals listed for each player do not include any matches played after the start of the tournament. The nationality for each club reflects the national association (not the league) to which the club is affiliated. The club listed is the last club where the player concerned plays a competitive match before the tournament. A flag is included for coaches that are of a different nationality than their own national team.

== Group A ==
=== Saudi Arabia ===
Head coach: (Greece) Georgios Donis

Saudi Arabia announced their final squad on 16 September 2026.

No.	Pos.	Player	Date of birth (age)	Caps	Goals	Club
1	GK	Nawaf Al-Aqidi (substituted off) (Note: On 25 September 2026, Saudi Arabia goalkeeper Nawaf Al-Aqidi was withdrawn from the squad after sustaining an injury during their opening match against Kuwait. He was replaced by Abdulquddus Atiah.)	10 May 2000 (aged 26)	24	0	(Saudi Arabian Football Federation) Al-Nassr
2	MF	Mohammed Abu Al-Shamat	11 August 2002 (aged 24)	11	0	(Saudi Arabian Football Federation) Al-Qadsiah
3	DF	Jehad Thakri	21 July 2001 (aged 25)	8	0	(Saudi Arabian Football Federation) Al-Qadsiah
4	DF	Abdulelah Al-Amri	15 January 1997 (aged 29)	47	2	(Saudi Arabian Football Federation) Al-Nassr
5	DF	Hassan Al-Tambakti	9 February 1999 (aged 27)	57	1	(Saudi Arabian Football Federation) Al-Hilal
6	MF	Nasser Al-Dawsari	19 December 1998 (aged 27)	50	1	(Saudi Arabian Football Federation) Al-Hilal
7	FW	Saleh Abu Al-Shamat	11 August 2002 (aged 24)	11	2	(Saudi Arabian Football Federation) Al-Ahli
8	MF	Alaa Al-Hejji	3 December 1995 (aged 30)	5	0	(Saudi Arabian Football Federation) Neom
9	FW	Firas Al-Buraikan	14 May 2000 (aged 26)	75	16	(Saudi Arabian Football Federation) Al-Ahli
10	MF	Mukhtar Ali	20 June 2003 (aged 23)	40	6	(Saudi Arabian Football Federation) Al-Ittihad
11	FW	Abdullah Al-Salem	19 December 1992 (aged 33)	3	0	(Saudi Arabian Football Federation) Al-Qadsiah
12	DF	Mohammed Mahzari	19 May 1999 (aged 27)	1	0	(Saudi Arabian Football Federation) Al-Hilal
13	DF	Nawaf Boushal	16 September 1999 (aged 27)	29	0	(Saudi Arabian Football Federation) Al-Nassr
14	DF	Hassan Kadesh	27 September 1992 (aged 33)	21	2	(Saudi Arabian Football Federation) Al-Ittihad
15	MF	Abdullah Al-Khaibari	16 August 1996 (aged 30)	45	0	(Saudi Arabian Football Federation) Al-Nassr
16	MF	Ziyad Al-Johani	11 November 2001 (aged 24)	12	0	(Saudi Arabian Football Federation) Al-Ahli
17	DF	Rayan Hamed	13 April 2002 (aged 24)	5	0	(Saudi Arabian Football Federation) Al-Ahli
18	MF	Mohammed al-Qahtani	23 July 2002 (aged 24)	7	0	(Saudi Arabian Football Federation) Al-Qadsiah
19	FW	Abdullah Al-Hamdan	13 September 1999 (aged 27)	55	13	(Saudi Arabian Football Federation) Al-Nassr
20	FW	Sultan Mandash	17 October 1994 (aged 31)	8	2	(Saudi Arabian Football Federation) Al-Hilal
21	GK	Mohammed Al-Owais (captain)	10 October 1991 (aged 34)	68	0	(Saudi Arabian Football Federation) Al-Hilal
22	GK	Hamed Al-Shanqiti	26 April 2005 (aged 21)	0	0	(Saudi Arabian Football Federation) Al-Kholood
23	MF	Mohamed Kanno	22 September 1994 (aged 32)	82	8	(Saudi Arabian Football Federation) Al-Hilal
24	DF	Moteb Al-Harbi	20 February 2000 (aged 26)	16	0	(Saudi Arabian Football Federation) Al-Hilal
25	FW	Hammam Al-Hammami	30 January 2004 (aged 22)	1	0	(Saudi Arabian Football Federation) Al-Shabab
26	DF	Zakaria Hawsawi	12 January 2001 (aged 25)	1	0	(Saudi Arabian Football Federation) Al-Ahli
27	GK	Abdulquddus Atiah (substituted on)	1 March 1997 (aged 29)	2	0	(Saudi Arabian Football Federation) Al-Ula

=== Iraq ===
Head coach: (Australia) Graham Arnold

Iraq announced their final squad on 16 September 2026.

No.	Pos.	Player	Date of birth (age)	Caps	Goals	Club
1	GK	Ahmed Basil	19 August 1996 (aged 30)	18	0	(Iraq Football Association) Al-Zawraa
2	DF	Maitham Jabbar	10 November 2000 (aged 25)	20	0	(Iraq Football Association) Al-Shorta
3	DF	Mustafa Saadoon	25 May 2001 (aged 25)	18	0	(Iraq Football Association) Zakho
4	DF	Zaid Tahseen	29 January 2001 (aged 25)	30	1	(Uzbekistan Football Association) Pakhtakor
5	DF	Akam Hashim	16 August 1998 (aged 28)	17	1	(Iraq Football Association) Zakho
6	MF	Zaid Ismail	3 January 2002 (aged 24)	8	0	(Iraq Football Association) Al-Talaba
7	MF	Jussef Nasrawe	22 March 2007 (aged 19)	1	0	(Austrian Football Association) SV Ried
8	MF	Ibrahim Bayesh	1 May 2000 (aged 26)	79	8	(Iraq Football Association) Erbil
9	MF	Mustafa Qabeel	8 January 2005 (aged 21)	0	0	(Iraq Football Association) Erbil
10	MF	Hasan Abdulkareem	1 January 1999 (aged 27)	22	1	(Iraq Football Association) Al-Zawraa
11	MF	Ahmed Qasem	12 July 2003 (aged 23)	6	0	(United States Soccer Federation) Nashville SC
12	GK	Mohammed Salih	27 May 1994 (aged 32)	0	0	(Iraq Football Association) Al-Quwa Al-Jawiya
13	FW	Saif Rasheed	2 March 2000 (aged 26)	0	0	(Iraq Football Association) Al-Talaba
14	MF	Zidane Iqbal	27 April 2003 (aged 23)	28	2	(Scottish Football Association) Dundee United
15	DF	Ahmed Yahya	1 July 1995 (aged 31)	20	0	(Iraq Football Association) Al-Shorta
16	MF	Amir Al-Ammari	27 July 1997 (aged 29)	54	3	(Polish Football Association) Cracovia
17	MF	Ali Jasim	20 January 2004 (aged 22)	38	2	(Iraq Football Association) Zakho
18	FW	Aymen Hussein (captain)	22 March 1996 (aged 30)	97	34	(Uzbekistan Football Association) Pakhtakor
19	MF	Mohammed Qasim	19 February 2003 (aged 23)	26	2	(Iraq Football Association) Al-Zawraa
20	MF	Karrar Nabeel	16 January 1998 (aged 28)	8	0	(Iraq Football Association) Al-Talaba
21	MF	Hayder Abdulkareem	7 August 2004 (aged 22)	0	0	(Saudi Arabian Football Federation) Al-Nassr
22	GK	Hussein Hassan	15 November 2002 (aged 23)	0	0	(Iraq Football Association) Erbil
23	DF	Merchas Doski	7 December 1999 (aged 26)	34	1	(Football Association of the Czech Republic) Viktoria Plzeň
24	DF	Mohammed Dlawar	15 December 2000 (aged 25)	0	0	(Iraq Football Association) Newroz
25	DF	Josef Al-Imam	27 July 2004 (aged 22)	0	0	(Iraq Football Association) Duhok
26	MF	Abdulrazzaq Qasim	19 February 2003 (aged 23)	0	0	(Iraq Football Association) Al-Shorta

=== Oman ===
Head coach: (Morocco) Tarik Sektioui

Oman announced their final squad on 14 September 2026.

No.	Pos.	Player	Date of birth (age)	Caps	Goals	Club
1	GK	Ibrahim Al-Mukhaini	20 June 1997 (aged 29)	51	0	(Oman Football Association) Al-Seeb
2	DF	Ghanim Al-Habashi	4 August 1998 (aged 28)	11	1	(Oman Football Association) Al-Nahda
3	DF	Khalid Al-Ghatrifi	3 December 2002 (aged 23)	2	0	(Oman Football Association) Al-Nasr
4	MF	Musab Al-Mamari	22 January 2000 (aged 26)	16	0	(Oman Football Association) Al-Shabab
5	DF	Musab Al-Shaqsy	1 July 2000 (aged 26)	6	0	(Oman Football Association) Al-Seeb
6	DF	Turki Beit Rabie	1 April 2004 (aged 22)	1	0	(Oman Football Association) Al-Nasr
7	FW	Issam Al-Sabhi	1 May 1997 (aged 29)	68	18	(Football Association of Thailand) Port
8	MF	Zahir Al-Aghbari	28 May 1999 (aged 27)	64	1	(Oman Football Association) Al-Seeb
9	FW	Waleed Al-Musalmi	25 October 1999 (aged 26)	3	0	(Oman Football Association) Sur
10	MF	Jameel Al-Yahmadi	27 July 1996 (aged 30)	77	4	(Oman Football Association) Al-Nahda
11	FW	Abdulsalam Al-Shukaili	25 April 1996 (aged 30)	2	0	(Oman Football Association) Al-Seeb
12	MF	Abdullah Fawaz	3 October 1996 (aged 29)	64	7	(Oman Football Association) Al-Seeb
13	DF	Amjad Al-Harthi	1 January 1994 (aged 32)	39	1	(Oman Football Association) Al-Nahda
14	DF	Ahmed Al-Kaabi	15 September 1996 (aged 30)	48	0	(Oman Football Association) Al-Nahda
15	MF	Hussein Al-Shahri	26 December 2002 (aged 23)	0	0	(Oman Football Association) Al-Shabab
16	DF	Khalid Al-Braiki	3 July 1993 (aged 33)	45	1	(Oman Football Association) Al-Shabab
17	MF	Nasser Al-Rawahi	26 June 2001 (aged 25)	15	2	(Oman Football Association) Al-Seeb
18	GK	Ibrahim Al-Rajhi	5 October 2000 (aged 25)	3	0	(Oman Football Association) Al-Nasr
19	DF	Yousuf Al-Malki	21 August 2000 (aged 26)	5	0	(Oman Football Association) Al-Shabab
20	FW	Abdulmajeed Al-Balushi	15 November 2004 (aged 21)	0	0	(Oman Football Association) Al-Seeb
21	MF	Sultan Al-Marzouq	23 October 2004 (aged 21)	7	0	(Oman Football Association) Dhofar
22	GK	Ahmed Al-Rawahi	5 May 1994 (aged 32)	6	0	(Oman Football Association) Bahla
23	MF	Harib Al-Saadi (captain)	23 September 1993 (aged 33)	121	3	(Oman Football Association) Al-Nahda
24	MF	Al-Harith Al-Mukhaini	4 August 2004 (aged 22)	0	0	(Oman Football Association) Oman Club
25	MF	Ahed Al-Mashaiki	30 May 2003 (aged 23)	11	0	(Oman Football Association) Al-Nahda
26	MF	Abdulhafez Al-Mukhaini	28 August 2002 (aged 24)	0	0	(Oman Football Association) Al-Nasr

=== Kuwait ===
Head coach: (Portugal) Hélio Sousa

Kuwait announced their final squad on 6 September 2026.

No.	Pos.	Player	Date of birth (age)	Caps	Goals	Club
1	GK	Khaled Al-Rashidi	20 April 1987 (aged 39)	49	0	(Kuwait Football Association) Al-Kuwait
2	DF	Abdulwahab Al-Awadi	2 June 2002 (aged 24)	7	0	(Kuwait Football Association) Al-Arabi
3	DF	Muath Al-Dhefiri	20 May 1997 (aged 29)	15	0	(Kuwait Football Association) Al-Qadsia
4	DF	Rashed Al-Dousari	18 July 2000 (aged 26)	28	0	(Kuwait Football Association) Al-Qadsia
5	DF	Fahad Al Hajeri	10 November 1991 (aged 34)	106	8	(Kuwait Football Association) Al-Kuwait
6	DF	Khaled Al-Fadhli	23 February 2002 (aged 24)	13	0	(Kuwait Football Association) Al-Qadsia
7	FW	Mohammad Daham	17 February 2000 (aged 26)	38	11	(Kuwait Football Association) Al-Kuwait
8	MF	Ahmed Al-Dhefiri	9 January 1992 (aged 34)	82	5	(Kuwait Football Association) Al-Kuwait
9	MF	Nasser Faleh	12 April 1999 (aged 27)	12	0	(Kuwait Football Association) Kazma
10	FW	Shabaib Al-Khaldi	11 August 1998 (aged 28)	45	18	(Kuwait Football Association) Kazma
11	FW	Eid Al-Rashidi	25 May 1999 (aged 27)	60	5	(Kuwait Football Association) Al-Qadsia
12	DF	Mohsen Al-Ghareeb	11 November 2004 (aged 21)	6	0	(Kuwait Football Association) Al-Kuwait
13	MF	Khaled Al-Mershed	6 April 1999 (aged 27)	5	0	(Kuwait Football Association) Al-Arabi
14	MF	Redha Abujabarah	22 April 1996 (aged 30)	52	1	(Kuwait Football Association) Al-Kuwait
15	FW	Yousef Majed	14 January 2005 (aged 21)	15	1	(Kuwait Football Association) Al-Arabi
16	MF	Mobarak Al-Faneeni	21 January 2000 (aged 26)	33	5	(Kuwait Football Association) Al-Qadsia
17	FW	Abdullah Al-Awadi	20 March 2003 (aged 23)	1	0	(Kuwait Football Association) Al-Qadsia
18	MF	Athbi Shehab	14 October 1993 (aged 32)	28	1	(Kuwait Football Association) Al-Qadsia
19	MF	Mahdi Dashti	26 October 2001 (aged 24)	15	0	(Kuwait Football Association) Al-Salmiya
20	FW	Yousef Nasser (captain)	9 October 1990 (aged 35)	131	58	(Kuwait Football Association) Al-Kuwait
21	MF	Jasem Al-Mutar	17 April 2006 (aged 20)	5	0	(Kuwait Football Association) Al-Qadsia
22	GK	Abdulrahman Al-Fadhli	23 January 2001 (aged 25)	1	0	(Kuwait Football Association) Al-Salmiya
23	GK	Saud Al-Hoshan	18 March 2000 (aged 26)	3	0	(Kuwait Football Association) Al-Kuwait
24	MF	Abdullah Al-Garzaei	18 September 2008 (aged 18)	1	0	(Kuwait Football Association) Al-Arabi
25	DF	Yousef Al-Haqan	5 February 2002 (aged 24)	1	0	(Kuwait Football Association) Al-Qadsia
26	DF	Abdulaziz Mahran	19 August 2001 (aged 25)	12	0	(Kuwait Football Association) Fahaheel
27	GK	Rakan Al-Saeed	1 January 2007 (aged 19)	0	0	(Kuwait Football Association) Al-Qadsia

== Group B ==
=== Qatar ===
Head coach: (Spain) Julen Lopetegui

Qatar announced their final squad on 17 September 2026.

No.	Pos.	Player	Date of birth (age)	Caps	Goals	Club
1	GK	Mahmud Abunada	5 February 2000 (aged 26)	8	0	(Qatar Football Association) Al-Rayyan
2	DF	Pedro Miguel	6 August 1990 (aged 36)	102	3	(Qatar Football Association) Al-Sadd
3	MF	Naif Al-Hadhrami	18 July 2001 (aged 25)	13	0	(Qatar Football Association) Lusail
4	DF	Issa Laye	22 December 1997 (aged 28)	7	0	(Qatar Football Association) Al-Arabi
5	DF	Tarek Salman	5 December 1997 (aged 28)	90	0	(Qatar Football Association) Al-Sadd
6	MF	Abdulaziz Hatem	28 October 1990 (aged 35)	118	11	(Qatar Football Association) Al-Rayyan
7	FW	Ahmed Alaaeldin	31 January 1993 (aged 33)	70	9	(Qatar Football Association) Al-Rayyan
8	FW	Edmilson Junior	19 August 1994 (aged 32)	19	0	(Qatar Football Association) Al-Duhail
9	FW	Yusuf Abdurisag	6 August 1999 (aged 27)	41	3	(Qatar Football Association) Al-Sadd
10	FW	Hassan Al-Haydos (captain)	11 December 1990 (aged 35)	188	42	(Qatar Football Association) Al-Sadd
11	FW	Akram Afif	18 November 1996 (aged 29)	128	39	(Qatar Football Association) Al-Sadd
12	MF	Karim Boudiaf	16 September 1990 (aged 36)	120	5	(Qatar Football Association) Al-Duhail
13	DF	Ayoub Al-Oui	11 March 2005 (aged 21)	8	0	(Qatar Football Association) Al-Gharafa
14	DF	Homam Ahmed	25 August 1999 (aged 27)	70	3	(Royal Spanish Football Federation) Valladolid
15	DF	Jassem Gaber	20 February 2002 (aged 24)	35	1	(Qatar Football Association) Al-Rayyan
16	DF	Boualem Khoukhi	9 July 1990 (aged 36)	119	21	(Qatar Football Association) Al-Sadd
17	FW	Ahmed Al-Ganehi	22 September 2000 (aged 26)	14	1	(Qatar Football Association) Al-Rayyan
18	DF	Sultan Al-Brake	7 April 1996 (aged 30)	19	0	(Qatar Football Association) Al-Duhail
19	FW	Almoez Ali	19 August 1996 (aged 30)	129	60	(Qatar Football Association) Al-Duhail
20	MF	Ahmed Fathy	25 January 1993 (aged 33)	51	0	(Qatar Football Association) Al-Arabi
21	GK	Salah Zakaria	24 April 1999 (aged 27)	8	0	(Qatar Football Association) Al-Duhail
22	GK	Shehab Ellethy	18 April 2000 (aged 26)	1	0	(Qatar Football Association) Al-Shahaniya
23	MF	Assim Madibo	22 October 1996 (aged 29)	53	0	(Qatar Football Association) Al-Duhail
24	FW	Tahsin Jamshid	16 June 2006 (aged 20)	3	0	(Qatar Football Association) Al-Duhail
25	FW	Hashim Ali	17 August 2000 (aged 26)	6	0	(Qatar Football Association) Al-Sadd
26	MF	Mohamed Manai	25 October 2002 (aged 23)	13	0	(Qatar Football Association) Al-Sadd

=== United Arab Emirates ===
Head coach: (Croatia) Zlatko Dalić

No.	Pos.	Player	Date of birth (age)	Caps	Goals	Club
1	GK	Hamad Al-Meqbaali	13 July 2003 (aged 23)	6	0	(United Arab Emirates Football Association) Shabab Al Ahli
2	DF	Rúben Canedo	19 October 2001 (aged 24)	11	0	(United Arab Emirates Football Association) Al Jazira
3	DF	Lucas Pimenta	17 July 2000 (aged 26)	16	0	(United Arab Emirates Football Association) Al Wahda
4	DF	Saša Ivković	13 May 1993 (aged 33)	8	1	(United Arab Emirates Football Association) Al Wasl
5	DF	Ala Zhir	7 March 2000 (aged 26)	6	0	(United Arab Emirates Football Association) Al Wahda
6	FW	Richard Akonnor	6 February 2004 (aged 22)	3	0	(Turkish Football Federation) Göztepe
7	FW	Ali Saleh	22 January 2000 (aged 26)	54	6	(United Arab Emirates Football Association) Al Wasl
8	MF	Nicolás Giménez	16 January 1996 (aged 30)	12	1	(United Arab Emirates Football Association) Al Wasl
9	MF	Harib Abdalla	26 November 2002 (aged 23)	45	8	(United Arab Emirates Football Association) Sharjah
10	MF	Fábio Lima	30 June 1993 (aged 33)	44	17	(United Arab Emirates Football Association) Al Wasl
11	FW	Bruno	10 June 2001 (aged 25)	17	2	(United Arab Emirates Football Association) Al Jazira
12	DF	Khalifa Al Hammadi	7 November 1998 (aged 27)	54	2	(United Arab Emirates Football Association) Al Jazira
13	DF	Erik	18 February 2001 (aged 25)	3	0	(United Arab Emirates Football Association) Al Ain
14	MF	Abdulla Hamad	18 September 2001 (aged 25)	13	0	(United Arab Emirates Football Association) Al Wahda
15	FW	Yuri César	6 May 2000 (aged 26)	0	0	(United Arab Emirates Football Association) Shabab Al Ahli
16	DF	Marcus Meloni	25 June 2000 (aged 26)	20	2	(United Arab Emirates Football Association) Al Jazira
17	GK	Khalid Eisa (captain)	15 September 1989 (aged 37)	94	0	(United Arab Emirates Football Association) Al Ain
18	MF	Luanzinho	21 April 2000 (aged 26)	9	2	(United Arab Emirates Football Association) Sharjah
19	DF	Khaled Ibrahim	17 January 1997 (aged 29)	27	1	(United Arab Emirates Football Association) Sharjah
20	FW	Guilherme Bala	16 September 2001 (aged 25)	0	0	(United Arab Emirates Football Association) Shabab Al Ahli
21	MF	Isam Faiz	6 March 2000 (aged 26)	13	0	(United Arab Emirates Football Association) Al Nasr
22	GK	Fahad Al-Dhanhani	3 September 1991 (aged 35)	2	0	(United Arab Emirates Football Association) Baniyas
23	FW	Sultan Adil	4 May 2004 (aged 22)	21	8	(United Arab Emirates Football Association) Shabab Al Ahli
24	MF	Mamadou Coulibaly	3 June 2003 (aged 23)	0	0	(United Arab Emirates Football Association) Al Jazira
25	DF	Zayed Sultan	11 April 2001 (aged 25)	16	1	(United Arab Emirates Football Association) Al Nasr
26	FW	Ousmane Camara	23 January 2001 (aged 25)	0	0	(United Arab Emirates Football Association) Sharjah

=== Bahrain ===
Head coach: (Croatia) Dragan Talajić

No.	Pos.	Player	Date of birth (age)	Caps	Goals	Club
1	GK	Omar Salem	26 May 1995 (aged 31)	2	0	(Bahrain Football Association) A'Ali
2	DF	Amine Benaddi	9 May 1993 (aged 33)	41	0	(Bahrain Football Association) Al-Muharraq
3	DF	Waleed Al Hayam (captain)	4 November 1988 (aged 37)	133	0	(Bahrain Football Association) Al-Muharraq
4	MF	Sayed Dhiya Saeed	17 July 1992 (aged 34)	139	8	(Bahrain Football Association) Al-Khaldiya
5	DF	Hamad Al-Shamsan	29 September 1997 (aged 28)	34	0	(Bahrain Football Association) Al-Riffa
6	MF	Abbas Al-Asfoor	2 February 1999 (aged 27)	17	0	(Bahrain Football Association) Al-Riffa
7	MF	Ali Madan	30 November 1995 (aged 30)	111	15	(Bahrain Football Association) Al-Riffa
8	MF	Mohamed Marhoon	12 February 1998 (aged 28)	87	19	(Kuwait Football Association) Al-Kuwait
9	FW	Hashim Sayed Isa	3 April 1998 (aged 28)	24	7	(Bahrain Football Association) Al-Ahli
10	MF	Kamil Al-Aswad	8 April 1994 (aged 32)	128	14	(Bahrain Football Association) Al-Riffa
11	MF	Ebrahim Al-Khattal	19 September 2000 (aged 26)	33	4	(Bahrain Football Association) Al-Hidd
12	FW	Mahdi Abduljabbar	25 June 1991 (aged 35)	54	15	(Bahrain Football Association) Al-Riffa
13	FW	Mohamed Al-Romaihi	9 September 1990 (aged 36)	60	20	(Bahrain Football Association) Al-Khaldiya
14	DF	Vincent Emmanuel	29 April 2001 (aged 25)	15	0	(Bahrain Football Association) Sitra
15	MF	Jasim Al-Shaikh	1 February 1996 (aged 30)	72	4	(Bahrain Football Association) Al-Riffa
16	DF	Sayed Baqer	14 April 1994 (aged 32)	41	2	(Bahrain Football Association) Al-Ahli
17	DF	Ahmed Rabea	13 September 2002 (aged 24)	0	0	(Bahrain Football Association) Al-Muharraq
18	MF	Ali Al-Doseri	17 October 2007 (aged 18)	0	0	(Bahrain Football Association) Al-Najma
19	MF	Mohammed Abdulqayoom	4 June 2001 (aged 25)	2	0	(Bahrain Football Association) Al-Ittifaq Maqaba
20	MF	Mahdi Al-Humaidan	19 May 1993 (aged 33)	79	8	(Bahrain Football Association) Al-Khaldiya
21	MF	Omar Saber	30 April 2001 (aged 25)	4	0	(Bahrain Football Association) Sitra
22	GK	Ebrahim Lutfalla	24 September 1992 (aged 33)	38	0	(Bahrain Football Association) Al-Ahli
23	DF	Abdulla Al-Khulasi	2 September 2003 (aged 23)	28	1	(Bahrain Football Association) Al-Muharraq
24	GK	Mohamed El Garably	26 October 1999 (aged 26)	2	0	(Bahrain Football Association) Al-Khaldiya
25	MF	Hasan Al-Karrani	27 November 1997 (aged 28)	2	0	(Bahrain Football Association) Al-Muharraq
26	FW	Husain Abdulkarim	14 May 2002 (aged 24)	10	0	(Bahrain Football Association) Al-Muharraq

=== Yemen ===
Head coach: (Algeria) Noureddine Ould Ali

Yemen announced their final squad on 19 September 2026.

No.	Pos.	Player	Date of birth (age)	Caps	Goals	Club
1	GK	Mohammed Aman	14 April 1997 (aged 29)	18	0	(Yemen Football Association) Ahli Sanaa
2	DF	Nader Sahal	1 January 1990 (aged 36)	5	0	(Saudi Arabian Football Federation) Bisha
3	DF	Haroon Al-Zubaidi	15 October 1999 (aged 26)	21	4	(United States Soccer Federation) Miami FC
4	DF	Hamza Al-Rimi	12 February 2002 (aged 24)	23	0	(Iraq Football Association) Al-Gharraf
5	DF	Emad Al-Godaimah	11 March 2003 (aged 23)	4	0	(Yemen Football Association) Al-Wehda
6	DF	Rami Al-Wasmani	1 February 1997 (aged 29)	15	0	Unattached
7	MF	Nasser Al-Gahwashi	24 May 1999 (aged 27)	37	16	(Kuwait Football Association) Kazma
8	MF	Anes Al-Maari	9 January 2000 (aged 26)	18	0	(Iraq Football Association) Al-Gharraf
9	FW	Omar Al-Dahi	15 December 1999 (aged 26)	39	6	Unattached
10	MF	Mohammed Al-Najjar	8 April 1997 (aged 29)	11	0	(Yemen Football Association) Al-Wehda
11	MF	Abdulwasea Al-Matari (captain)	4 July 1994 (aged 32)	76	14	(Iraq Football Association) Diyala
12	FW	Mamdooh Bin Ajaj	26 August 2003 (aged 23)	9	0	(Yemen Football Association) Al-Tadamun Hadramaut
13	DF	Saqr Al-Darbi	2 April 2001 (aged 25)	0	0	(Yemen Football Association) Ahli Sanaa
14	DF	Ali Al-Dugin	2 May 2003 (aged 23)	2	0	(Yemen Football Association) Al-Shaab Hadramaut
15	MF	Osama Anbar	20 January 1995 (aged 31)	23	0	(Yemen Football Association) Ahli Sanaa
16	MF	Omar Al-Golan	1 January 2000 (aged 26)	13	1	(Yemen Football Association) Al-Tadamun Hadramaut
17	FW	Abdul Majeed Sabarah	22 August 2000 (aged 26)	20	3	Unattached
18	MF	Adel Abbas Qasem	1 March 2008 (aged 18)	5	1	(Saudi Arabian Football Federation) Al-Shabab U21
19	DF	Radhawan Al-Hubaishi	3 July 1993 (aged 33)	16	1	(Yemen Football Association) Al-Tadamun Hadramaut
20	MF	Tareq Shihab	7 March 2001 (aged 25)	4	0	(Football Association of Iceland) HK
21	FW	Ahmed Maher	24 January 2002 (aged 24)	18	1	(Yemen Football Association) Al-Wehda Sanaa
22	GK	Osamah Mokref	1 March 2005 (aged 21)	0	0	(Yemen Football Association) Al-Wehda
23	GK	Osama Haidar	22 May 1999 (aged 27)	0	0	(Yemen Football Association) Al-Shaab Hadramaut
24	FW	D'Mani Mellor	20 September 2000 (aged 26)	0	0	(The Football Association) Forest Green Rovers
25	DF	Hamzah Al-Surabi	6 December 2006 (aged 19)	2	0	(Yemen Football Association) Al-Yarmuk Al-Rawda
26	MF	Nawaf Abdullah	31 December 1994 (aged 31)	4	0	(Bahrain Football Association) Malkiya
