= Hashim Sayed Isa =

Bahraini footballer (born 1998)

Sayed Hashim Isa
Personal information
- Full name: Hashim Sayed Isa Hasan Radhi Hashim
- Date of birth: 3 April 1998 (age 28)
- Place of birth: Manama, Bahrain
- Height: 1.77 m (5 ft 10 in)
- Position: Forward

Team information
- Current team: Al-Riffa
- Number: 9

Senior career*
Years	Team	Apps	(Gls)
2016–2018	Al-Riffa		
2018–2019	Malkiya		
2019–	Al-Riffa		

International career^{‡}
2017	Bahrain U20	2	(0)
2018–	Bahrain U23	10	(3)
2017–	Bahrain	17	(6)
- * Club domestic league appearances and goals ‡ National team caps and goals as of 26 January 2024

Hashim Sayed Isa Hasan Radhi Hashim (Arabic: هَاشِم سَيِّد عِيسَى حَسَن رَضِيّ هَاشِم; born 3 April 1998) is a Bahraini professional footballer who plays as a forward for Bahraini Premier League club Al-Riffa and the Bahrain national team.

== Club career ==
=== Malkiya ===
On 12 February 2018, Isa scored two goals against Al-Suwaiq in his club debut in the AFC Cup.

=== Al-Riffa ===
On 19 June 2019, Al-Riffa announced the signing of Isa on a four-year contract.

== Career statistics ==
=== International goals ===
Scores and results list Bahrain's goal tally first.

No.	Date	Venue	Opponent	Score	Result	Competition
1.	12 November 2020	Police Officers' Club Stadium, Dubai, United Arab Emirates	Lebanon	1–1	3–1	Friendly
2.	15 June 2021	Bahrain National Stadium, Riffa, Bahrain	Hong Kong	2–0	4–0	2022 FIFA World Cup qualification
3.	15 June 2021	Bahrain National Stadium, Riffa, Bahrain	Hong Kong	3–0	4–0	2022 FIFA World Cup qualification
4.	25 June 2021	Khalifa International Stadium, Al Rayyan, Qatar	Kuwait	2–0	2–0	2021 FIFA Arab Cup qualification
5.	1 February 2022	Bahrain National Stadium, Riffa, Bahrain	DR Congo	1–0	1–0	Friendly
6.	31 May 2022	BG Stadium, Pathum Thani, Thailand	Thailand	2–1	2–1	Friendly
7.	3 December 2025	Al-Bayt Stadium, Khor, Qatar	Iraq	1–2	1–2	2025 FIFA Arab Cup
