= Bahrain national football team =

Men's association football team

Bahrain
- Nickname(s): الأحمر, al-Aḥmar (The Red)
- Association: Bahrain Football Association (BFA)
- Confederation: AFC (Asia)
- Sub-confederation: WAFF (West Asia)
- Head coach: Félix Sánchez
- Captain: Sayed Dhiya Saeed
- Most caps: Sayed Mohammed Jaffer (163)
- Top scorer: Ismail Abdullatif (48)
- Home stadium: Bahrain National Stadium
- FIFA code: BHR
First colours	Second colours

FIFA ranking
- Current: 96 ▲1 (18 November 2026)
- Highest: 44 (September 2004)
- Lowest: 139 (March 2000)

First international
- Bahrain 4–4 Kuwait (Baghdad, Iraq; 2 April 1966)

Biggest win
- Bahrain 10–0 Indonesia (Riffa, Bahrain; 29 February 2012)

Biggest defeat
- Iraq 10–1 Bahrain (Baghdad, Iraq; 5 April 1966)

Asian Cup
- Appearances: 8 (first in 1988)
- Best result: Fourth place (2004)

Arab Cup
- Appearances: 7 (first in 1966)
- Best result: Runners-up (1985, 2002)

WAFF Championship
- Appearances: 5 (first in 2010)
- Best result: Champions (2019)

Arabian Gulf Cup
- Appearances: 27 (first in 1970)
- Best result: Champions (2019, 2024–25)

The Bahrain national football team (Arabic: منتخب الْبَحرَيْن لِكُرَّةُ الْقَدَم) represents Bahrain in international football and is controlled by the Bahrain Football Association, which was founded in 1951. The country is affiliated with FIFA since 1968 and has been a member of the AFC since 1957. They have never reached the FIFA World Cup.

Bahrain won the FIFA's most improved team award in 2004, and finished fourth at the 2004 AFC Asian Cup, beating Uzbekistan in the quarter-finals but losing to Japan in the semi-finals 4–3. Bahrain then lost to Iran in the third-place match, thus finishing in fourth place overall. Bahrain had a golden year in 2019, winning both the WAFF Championship and the Arabian Gulf Cup for the first time, under the stewardship of Hélio Sousa. On 4 January 2025, Bahrain won the 26th Arabian Gulf Cup, defeating Oman 2–1.

== History ==
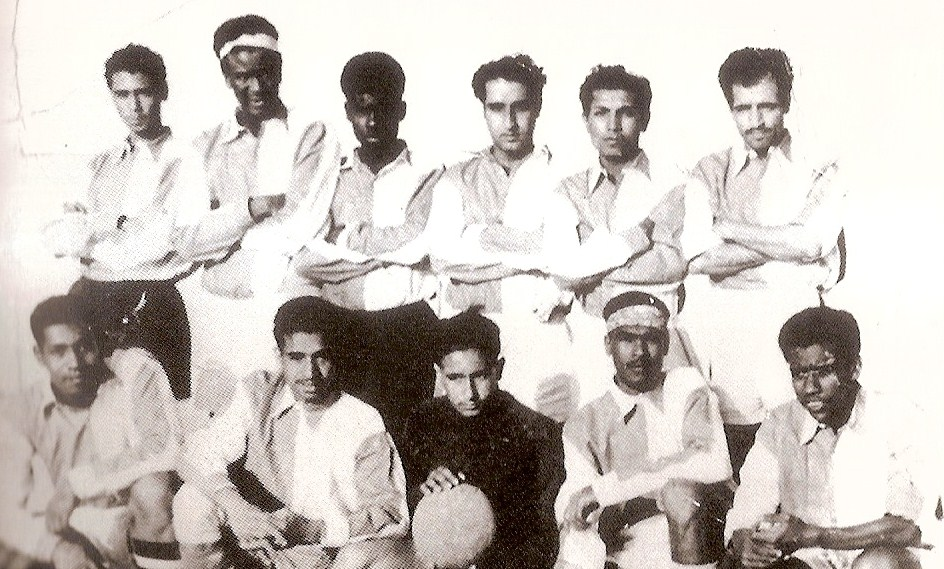
The 1959 national football team

=== Early years ===
Although Bahrain’s first national football team was established in 1959, the side was not officially organized until 1966, when it played a friendly match against Kuwait that ended in a 4–4 draw. During this period, Bahrain, despite remaining under British influence, had been granted a degree of autonomy that allowed the country to develop its football infrastructure. Historically, Bahrain was considered one of the weaker teams in the Gulf region, which included stronger sides such as Saudi Arabia, Qatar, the United Arab Emirates, and Kuwait. As a result, Bahrain’s early international participation was largely limited to the Arabian Gulf Cup.

Bahrain qualified for its first AFC Asian Cup in 1988, but finished at the bottom of its group with two draws. In the years that followed, the senior national team received limited attention and investment, despite notable achievements at youth levels, particularly with the under-17 and under-20 teams. It was not until the late 20th century that Bahrain began to show significant improvement, marking a turning point in the development of football in the country.

Bahrain delivered notable performances during the qualification campaigns for the 2000 AFC Asian Cup and the 2002 FIFA World Cup, reaching the final round of World Cup qualifying for the first time. Although the team did not qualify in either competition, Bahrain recorded significant victories over Iran—winning 1–0 in Aleppo during the 2000 Asian Cup qualifiers and 3–1 at home during the 2002 World Cup qualifiers. The latter result had implications for the regional qualification standings, as it prevented Iran from securing a direct World Cup berth and contributed to Saudi Arabia’s qualification. The match subsequently drew attention due to celebrations by some Bahraini supporters, which added to existing tensions between the two countries’ football fan bases.

=== 2004 AFC Asian Cup ===
Bahrain delivered a strong performance at the 2004 AFC Asian Cup in only its second appearance in the tournament. Drawn into a group with hosts China, Qatar, and Indonesia, the team progressed through the group stage undefeated, earning a 2–2 draw against China in Beijing, a 1–1 draw with Qatar, and a 3–1 victory over Indonesia to advance to the quarter-finals for the first time. Bahrain then defeated Uzbekistan on penalties after a 2–2 draw in the quarter-finals. In the semi-finals, Bahrain narrowly lost 4–3 after extra time to defending champions Japan, before falling 4–2 to Iran in the third-place match. The team’s performance in the tournament is regarded as a significant milestone in the development of Bahraini football.

=== 2006 World Cup ===
After both Uzbekistan and Bahrain finished third in their respective groups during the 2006 FIFA World Cup qualifiers, the two teams met in a two-legged AFC playoff. Bahrain advanced on the away goals rule after a 1–1 aggregate draw. This result qualified Bahrain for an inter-confederation playoff against the fourth-placed CONCACAF team, Trinidad and Tobago, for a place at the World Cup. The first leg ended 1–1 in Port of Spain, but Bahrain lost the return match 1–0 in Manama, allowing Trinidad and Tobago to qualify for the World Cup for the first time.

=== 2007 Asian Cup ===
Bahrain competed in Group D during the qualification stage for the 2007 AFC Asian Cup. The team fielded a largely under-23 squad in its match against Australia, which ended in a 2–0 defeat. Bahrain ultimately secured qualification by defeating Kuwait in their final group match. At the tournament, Bahrain were eliminated in the group stage after losses to Indonesia and Saudi Arabia, despite recording an upset victory over the Korea Republic.

=== 2010 World Cup ===
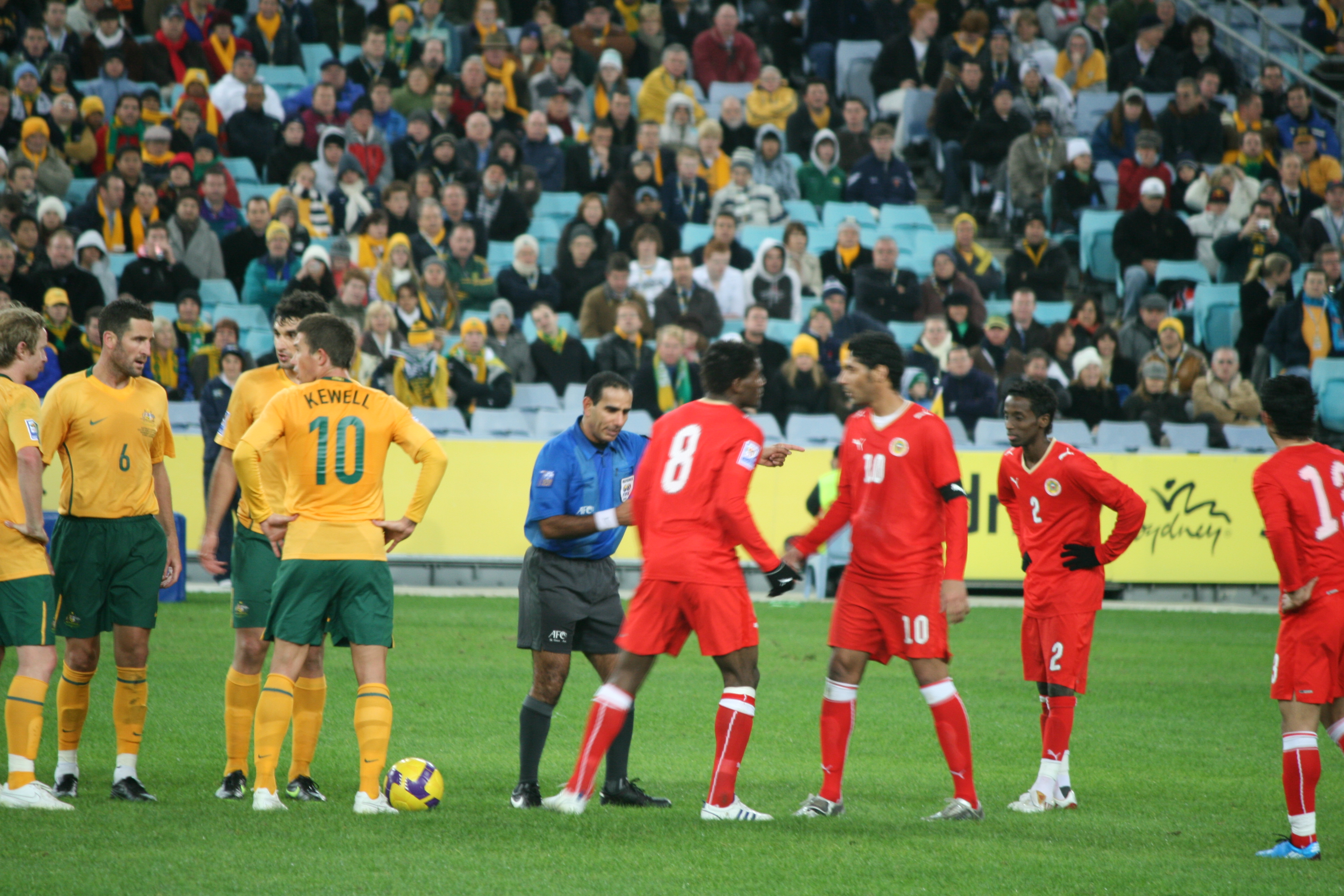
The Bahrain national football team playing Australia on 10 June 2009 in a World Cup qualifier

In the third round of the 2010 FIFA World Cup qualification campaign, Bahrain were placed in Group B alongside Japan, Oman, and Thailand, finishing second to advance to the final round. In the final group stage, Bahrain placed third behind Australia and Japan, but ahead of Uzbekistan and Qatar. This set up a two-legged playoff against Saudi Arabia to determine Asia’s fifth-placed team. After a 0–0 draw in the home leg, Bahrain earned a 2–2 draw in Riyadh with a stoppage-time goal, progressing on the away goals rule.

Bahrain then faced New Zealand in the inter-confederation playoff, where a win would have secured their first World Cup appearance. The first leg in Manama ended goalless on 10 October 2009, and Bahrain were defeated 1–0 in the return leg in Wellington on 14 November 2009, narrowly missing out on qualification for a second consecutive cycle.

=== Crisis period ===
==== 2011 Asian Cup ====
Bahrain qualified for the 2011 AFC Asian Cup, hosted by neighbouring Qatar, and were placed in a group with Australia, South Korea, and India. In their opening match, Bahrain faced South Korea in an attempt to replicate their 2–1 victory from the 2007 tournament, but South Korea came from behind to win by the same scoreline. Bahrain then kept their qualification hopes alive with a 5–2 win over India. However, a 1–0 defeat to Australia in their final group match resulted in Bahrain’s elimination at the group stage.

==== 2014 World Cup ====
In the 2014 FIFA World Cup qualifiers, Bahrain did considerably worse. In the third round, they were drawn against Indonesia, Iran and Qatar. Although they managed to defeat Indonesia both home and away, they also lost 6–0 by Iran away from home, and drew their other 3 games. Although they had a higher goal difference than Qatar, they needed an extra point to advance to the next round, or Qatar had to be beaten by Iran in the final round. If they had also drawn to Iran away from home, they would have advanced. But neither luck came to them, and their campaign ended in the third round, their worst result since the 1998 World Cup qualifiers.

Pos	Team	Pld	W	D	L	GF	GA	GD	Pts	Qualification	Iran national football team	Qatar national football team	Bahrain national football team	Indonesia national football team
1	Iran	6	3	3	0	17	5	+12	12	Fourth round	—	2–2	6–0	3–0
2	Qatar	6	2	4	0	10	5	+5	10	Fourth round	1–1	—	0–0	4–0
3	Bahrain	6	2	3	1	13	7	+6	9		1–1	0–0	—	10–0
4	Indonesia	6	0	0	6	3	26	−23	0		1–4	2–3	0–2	—

==== 2015 Asian Cup ====
The 2015 AFC Asian Cup once again became a disappointment for the Bahrainis, even though their group was easier, with only Iran being the biggest opponent while the UAE and Qatar were no strangers. Bahrain lost two opening games against Iran and the UAE 0–2 and 1–2, the latter defeat was subject to the earliest goal in Asian Cup history by Ali Mabkhout. Bahrain salvaged some pride with a 2–1 win over Qatar, condemning its neighbour to bottom of the group while Bahrain finished third for the second consecutive Asian Cup.

==== 2018 World Cup and 2019 Asian Cup qualifications ====
In the 2018 FIFA World Cup qualifiers second round, Bahrain finished fourth in a group with Uzbekistan, North Korea, Philippines and Yemen. The poor performance of the Bahraini side caused huge public uproar over the team's ongoing decline, rocked the chair of manager Sergio Batista. He was eventually sacked and replaced by Czech youth coach Miroslav Soukup, who decided to revamp the team.

Later on, Bahrain participated in the 2019 AFC Asian Cup qualification, where finished first in the third round in a group with Turkmenistan, Chinese Taipei and Singapore, to qualify to the next AFC Asian Cup. However, the team's performance was far from perfect. The team suffered a home draw to minnows Singapore, before getting humiliated by Chinese Taipei away 1–2 that was considered as a shock, since Taiwan is not a football nation. This defeat also prompted Bahrain's main star, Ismail Abdullatif, to retire from the team.

Bahrain managed some promising performance during this deteriorating era, reaching semi-finals of the 23rd Arabian Gulf Cup held in Kuwait.

=== Short-lived glory ===
==== 2019 Asian Cup; WAFF Championship and Gulf Cup champions ====
At the 2019 AFC Asian Cup, Bahrain was grouped with India, Thailand and hosts United Arab Emirates. The Bahrainis managed a promising early performance when they faced the hosts, scored a goal lead in 78', but was eventually held 1–1 following an unclear penalty decision by the Jordanian referee Adham Makhadmeh. However, Bahrain suffered a blasting loss to Thailand 0–1, leaving the team flounder despite its earlier performance. In the final match against India, which the Indians only required a draw to progress, Bahrain however managed to get a needed penalty in injury time, where Jamal Rashid turned hero as Bahrain won the fixture 1–0 to seal the team into the knockout stage for the only second times ever, and eliminated the Indians from the competition. The Bahraini side then played its own round of sixteen match, where they lost 2–1 to South Korea after extra time. This was considered as a major success for Bahraini football, and also to be the end of the country's football misfortune that endured since 2010s.

Afterwards, Bahrain managed to win two competitions for the first time, after defeating both Iraq and Saudi Arabia, 1–0 under the leadership of Hélio Sousa against all odds, in the WAFF Championship and Gulf Cup respectively.

==== 2022 World Cup ====
Bahrain defeated Iran 1–0 in the 2022 FIFA World Cup Qualification Round 2, delivering a major upset in the qualifying process, and with Bahrain enjoying huge edge in the qualifiers, Bahrain was expected to reach the third round. However, due to COVID-19 pandemic, Bahrain's great progression in 2019 was reversed when it lost significant home supports (despite being designated as hosts for the remaining games) due to pandemic, as fans were barred from attending, Iran having replaced manager as well, combining the Bahrain's domestic league under frequent disruption due to the pandemic, all left Bahraini players little time to organise their team. Bahrain triumphed against Cambodia 8–0 in their first game since the pandemic began, but against an Iranian side that was entirely revamped, a Bahraini side without home support was completely demoralised, losing 0–3 in process. This defeat proved to be disastrous for Bahrain, as their 4–0 victory over Hong Kong was too little, too late, due to Iran prevailing 1–0 over Iraq in the final game.

==== 2023 Asian Cup ====
In the 2023 AFC Asian Cup, Bahrain won their group (which contained Malaysia, South Korea, and Jordan). After a first matchday loss to South Korea, they followed it up with back-to-back wins, before falling to Japan in the Round of 16.

==== 2026 World Cup qualification ====
Bahrain's 2026 World Cup qualifying campaign had been the worst since their return to the final round in 16 years. After dominating the second round with ease, Bahrain started the third round with a glorious shock 1–0 away win over Australia in the opener, triggering widespread optimism of Bahrain's fulfillment of qualifying for a maiden FIFA World Cup. Yet, what followed later had been a string of catastrophic defeats, such as consecutive losses to Japan, and three shock losses to China and Indonesia, despite being unbeaten to Australia and a goalless away draw to Saudi Arabia, and their conquest at the 26th Arabian Gulf Cup. In particular, the shock 1–0 home defeat to China, as well as the similar shock away loss by the same scoreline against Indonesia, were particularly damaging as they contributed to Bahrain's WCQ collapse. More noteworthy, after winning the Gulf Cup in early January 2025, Bahrain failed to score in four consecutive WCQ fixtures while conceded six in total, suggesting Bahrain had severe issues in finding reliable strikers throughout the remainders. In the end, Bahrain finished bottom of the table with only five goals (the worst offensive power in the third round) and just two sole goalscorers, Mahdi Abduljabbar and Mohamed Marhoon, to end the country's forgettable final round campaign as Bahrain's 2026 FIFA World Cup quest ended in disaster as Bahrain missed out of a spot for the World Cup again.

==== 2026 Arabian Gulf Cup ====
Bahrain's 2026 Arabian Gulf Cup ended in disaster, they were drawn into Group B with Qatar, UAE and Yemen. They began the tournament losing 2-0 to Qatar, then lost to UAE 3-0, then in the final game vs Yemen came the most humiliating loss yet, an embarrassing 5-2 defeat after taking the lead in the 6th minute, which led to them finishing behind Yemen, and bottom in their group.

== Team image ==
=== Kit suppliers ===
Kit manufacturer	Period
(United Kingdom) Umbro	1981
(Germany) Puma	1982
(Thailand) Grand Sport	1983–1986
(Saudi Arabia) Faisok	1986
(Thailand) Grand Sport	1987–1996
(Germany) Puma	1997
(Bahrain) Baraka Sports	1998–1999
(South Korea) Kika	2000–2002
(Bahrain) Shoot Sports	2002–2003
(Italy) Diadora	2003–2005
(Germany) Puma	2005–2014
(United Arab Emirates) Romai	2014–2018
(Italy) Macron	2019–2022
(Germany) Puma	2023–2026
(Germany) Adidas	2026–present

== Results and fixtures ==
The following is a list of match results in the last 12 months, as well as any future matches that have been scheduled.

Win Draw Loss Fixture

=== 2025 ===
26 November 2025 FIFA Arab Cup Qualification	Bahrain	1–0	Djibouti	Doha, Qatar
13:00 UTC+3	Al-Romaihi 36'			Stadium: Jassim bin Hamad Stadium; Attendance: 1,600

3 December 2025 FIFA Arab Cup	Iraq	2–1	Bahrain	Doha, Qatar
17:30 UTC+3	Lutfalla 10' (o.g.); M. Ali 25'	Report	Hashim 79'; Al-Khattal (red card) 90+3'	Stadium: Stadium 974; Attendance: 9,358; Referee: Pierre Atcho (Gabon)

6 December 2025 FIFA Arab Cup	Bahrain	1–5	Algeria	Al Rayyan, Qatar
16:30 UTC+3	Abduljabbar 27'	Report	Berkane 24', 48'; Boulbina 30', 80'; Benzia 45+7' (pen.)	Stadium: Khalifa International Stadium; Attendance: 20,260; Referee: Campbell-Kirk Kawana-Waugh (New Zealand Football

9 December 2025 FIFA Arab Cup	Bahrain	3–1	Sudan	Al Rayyan, Qatar
20:00 UTC+3	Abduljabbar 37'; Al-Romaihi 79' (pen.); Al-Humaidan 89'	Report	M. Ahmed (yellow card) 21' (red card) 58'; Muzamel 72'	Stadium: Education City Stadium; Attendance: 21,386; Referee: Juan Gabriel Benítez (Paraguay)

=== 2026 ===
22 March Friendly	Bahrain	Cancelled	Uganda	Antalya, Türkiye
--:-- UTC+3		Report
Note: Match cancelled due to travel disruptions from the 2026 Iran war.

30 March Friendly	Kyrgyzstan	Cancelled	Bahrain	Antalya, Türkiye
--:-- UTC+3
Note: Match cancelled due to travel disruptions from the 2026 Iran war.

5 June Friendly	Georgia	2–0	Bahrain	Tbilisi, Georgia
21:00 UTC+3	Lochoshvili 52'; Kvaratskhelia 77' (pen.)	Report		Stadium: Mikheil Meskhi Stadium; Attendance: 10,997; Referee: Duncan Nicolson (Scotland)

9 June Friendly	Syria	Cancelled	Bahrain	Antalya, Türkiye
17:00 UTC+3				Stadium: Gloria Sports Arena
Note: Match cancelled due to travel disruptions for the Syria National Football Team.

24 September 2026 Gulf Cup GS	Qatar	2–0	Bahrain	Jeddah, Saudi Arabia
21:00 UTC+3	Khoukhi 61'; Al-Haydos 90+9' (pen.)	Report		Stadium: Prince Abdullah Al-Faisal Sports City Stadium; Attendance: 1,918; Referee: Khalid Al-Turais (Saudi Arabia)

27 September 2026 Gulf Cup GS	Bahrain	0–3	United Arab Emirates	Jeddah, Saudi Arabia
21:00 UTC+3		Report	Camara 30'; Bala 66'; Saleh 88'	Stadium: Prince Abdullah Al-Faisal Sports City Stadium; Referee: Abdullah Jamali (Kuwait)

30 September 2026 Gulf Cup GS	Bahrain	2–5	Yemen	Jeddah, Saudi Arabia
--:-- UTC+3	Al-Doseri 7'; Madan 67'		Al-Gahwashi 18'; Al-Matari 31'; Al-Wasmani 40', 90+5'	Stadium: Prince Abdullah Al-Faisal Sports City Stadium

14 November Friendly	Bahrain	3–1	Yemen	Zhaoqing, China
14:00 UTC+8	Helal 36' (pen.); Al-Aswad 45'; Al-Surabi 72' (o.g.)		Sabarah 22'	Stadium: Zhaoqing New District Sports Center Stadium; Attendance: 221; Referee: Shen Yinhao (China)

17 November Friendly	China	2–2	Bahrain	Zhaoqing, China
20:00 UTC+8	Abduweli 37'; Zhang Yuning 80' (pen.)		Kayoum 2'; Bughammar 20'	Stadium: Zhaoqing New District Sports Center Stadium

=== 2027 ===
8 January 2027 Asian Cup GS	Bahrain	v	North Korea	Riyadh, Saudi Arabia
--:--				Stadium: Imam Mohammed Ibn Saud University Stadium

13 January 2027 Asian Cup GS	Jordan	v	Bahrain	Jeddah, Saudi Arabia
--:--				Stadium: King Abdullah Sports City Stadium

18 January 2027 Asian Cup GS	Uzbekistan	v	Bahrain	Jeddah, Saudi Arabia
--:--				Stadium: Prince Abdullah Al-Faisal Sports City Stadium

== Coaching staff ==
=== Current coaching staff ===
Role	Name
Head coach	(Spain) Félix Sánchez
Assistant coaches	(Spain) Albert Fernández
Assistant coaches	(Spain) Javier Ramos
Assistant coaches	(Bahrain) Ahmed Kamal
Assistant coaches	(Bahrain) Ismail Abdullatif
Goalkeeper Coach	(Germany) Julius Büscher
Fitness Coach	(Spain) Carlos Domenech (Spain) Alberto Mendez
Team manager	(Bahrain) Mahmoud Riyad

=== Coaching history ===
As of March 2019

Caretaker managers are listed in italics.

- (Bahrain) Jassim Al-Maawada and
  (Egypt) Abdul-Salam Alam (1966)
- (Egypt) Hamada El-Sharqawi (1970–1974)
- (Scotland) Danny McLennan (1974–1975)
- (Bahrain) Adnan Ayoub and
  (Bahrain) Khalifa Al-Hamdan (1975)
- (England) Jack Mansell (1976)
- (England) Mal Thompson and Michael Gorman (1979)
- (Socialist Federal Republic of Yugoslavia) Ljubiša Broćić (1979–1981)
- (Egypt) Farouq Ahmed Ali (1981)
- (Brazil) Sebastião Pereira de Araújo (1982–1984, 1992–1993)
- (England) Keith Burkinshaw (1984–1986)
- (England) Robbie Stepney (1986–1987)
- (Tunisia) Abdelmajid Chetali (1988)
- (Tunisia) Mohamed Al-Arabi Al-Zouaui (1988)
- (West Germany) Uli Maslo (1990–1992)
- (Bahrain) Faisal Alshehabı (2007)
- (Federal Republic of Yugoslavia) Ivan Čabrinović (1994)
- (Romania) Victor Stănculescu (1995–1996)
- (Bahrain) Fuad Boshqar (1996)
- (Austria) Josef Hickersberger (1997)
- (Brazil) Ernesto Rosa Guedes (1998)
- (Romania) Alexandru Moldovan (1999)
- (Bahrain) Ahmed D. Al Jalahama (2000)
- (Germany) Wolfgang Sidka (2001–2002, 2005)
- (France) Yves Herbet (2003)
- (Croatia) Srećko Juričić (2003–2005)
- (Croatia) Luka Peruzović (2005–2006)
- (Bahrain) Riyadh Al-Thawadi (2006)
- (Germany) Hans-Peter Briegel (2006–2007)
- (Bosnia and Herzegovina) Senad Kreso (2007)
- (Czech Republic) Milan Máčala (2008–2010)
- (Austria) Josef Hickersberger (2010)
- (Bahrain) Marjan Eid (2010)
- (Bahrain) Salman Sharida (2010–2011)
- (England) Peter Taylor (2011–2012)
- (Argentina) Gabriel Calderón (2012–2013)
- (England) Anthony Hudson (2013–2014)
- (Iraq) Adnan Hamad (2014)
- (Bahrain) Marjan Eid (2014–2015)
- (Argentina) Sergio Batista (2015–2016)
- (Czech Republic) Miroslav Soukup (2016–2019)
- (Portugal) Hélio Sousa (2019–2023)
- (Spain) Juan Antonio Pizzi (2023–2024)
- (Croatia) Dragan Talajić (2024–2026)
- (Spain) Félix Sánchez (2026–)

== Players ==
=== Current squad ===
The following players were called up for the 27th Arabian Gulf Cup in September and October 2026.

Caps and goals correct as of 24 September 2026, after the match against Qatar.

No.	Pos.	Player	Date of birth (age)	Caps	Goals	Club
1	GK	Omar Salem	26 May 1995 (age 31)	2	0	(Bahrain Football Association) A'Ali (on loan from Al-Muharraq)
22	GK	Ebrahim Lutfalla	24 September 1992 (age 34)	39	0	(Bahrain Football Association) Al-Ahli (on loan from Al-Muharraq)
24	GK	Mohamed El Garably	26 October 1999 (age 27)	2	0	(Bahrain Football Association) Al-Khaldiya
2	DF	Amine Benaddi	9 May 1993 (age 33)	42	0	(Bahrain Football Association) Al-Muharraq
3	DF	Waleed Al Hayam	4 November 1988 (age 38)	134	0	(Bahrain Football Association) Al-Muharraq
5	DF	Hamad Al-Shamsan	29 September 1997 (age 29)	35	0	(Bahrain Football Association) Al-Riffa
14	DF	Vincent Emmanuel	29 April 2001 (age 25)	16	0	(Bahrain Football Association) Sitra
16	DF	Sayed Baqer	14 April 1994 (age 32)	41	2	(Bahrain Football Association) Al-Ahli
17	DF	Ahmed Rabea	13 September 2002 (age 24)	0	0	(Bahrain Football Association) Al-Muharraq
23	DF	Abdulla Al-Khulasi	2 September 2003 (age 23)	29	1	(Bahrain Football Association) Al-Muharraq
4	MF	Sayed Dhiya Saeed	17 July 1992 (age 34)	140	8	(Bahrain Football Association) Al-Khaldiya
6	MF	Abbas Al-Asfoor	2 February 1999 (age 27)	18	0	(Bahrain Football Association) Al-Riffa
7	MF	Ali Madan	30 November 1995 (age 30)	112	15	(Bahrain Football Association) Al-Riffa
8	MF	Mohamed Marhoon	12 February 1998 (age 28)	88	19	(Kuwait Football Association) Kuwait SC
10	MF	Kamil Al-Aswad	8 April 1994 (age 32)	129	14	(Bahrain Football Association) Al-Riffa
11	MF	Ebrahim Al-Khattal	19 September 2000 (age 26)	34	4	(Bahrain Football Association) Al-Hidd (on loan from Al-Riffa)
15	MF	Jasim Al-Shaikh	1 February 1996 (age 30)	72	4	(Bahrain Football Association) Al-Riffa
19	MF	Mohammed Abdulqayoom	4 June 2001 (age 25)	2	0	(Bahrain Football Association) Al-Ittifaq Maqaba
20	MF	Mahdi Al-Humaidan	19 May 1993 (age 33)	80	8	(Bahrain Football Association) Al-Khaldiya
21	MF	Omar Saber	30 April 2001 (age 25)	4	0	(Bahrain Football Association) Sitra (on loan from Al-Muharraq)
25	MF	Hasan Al-Karrani	27 November 1997 (age 28)	2	0	(Bahrain Football Association) Al-Muharraq
26	MF	Ali Al-Doseri	17 October 2007 (age 19)	0	0	(Bahrain Football Association) Al-Najma
9	FW	Hashim Sayed Isa	3 April 1998 (age 28)	25	7	(Bahrain Football Association) Al-Ahli
12	FW	Mahdi Abduljabbar	25 June 1991 (age 35)	55	15	(Bahrain Football Association) Al-Riffa
13	FW	Mohamed Al-Romaihi	9 September 1990 (age 36)	61	20	(Bahrain Football Association) Al-Khaldiya
18	FW	Husain Abdulkarim	14 May 2002 (age 24)	10	0	(Bahrain Football Association) Al-Muharraq

=== Recent call-ups ===
The following players have been called up for the team in the last 12 months.

Pos.	Player	Date of birth (age)	Caps	Goals	Club	Latest call-up
GK	Abdulkarim Fardan	25 April 1992 (age 34)	1	0	(Bahrain) Al-Riffa	v. Georgia, 5 June 2026
DF	Ahmad Khaled Ali	13 September 2002 (age 24)	1	0	(Bahrain) Al-Muharraq	v. Georgia, 5 June 2026
DF	Mohamed Adel	20 September 1996 (age 30)	39	0	(Bahrain) Al-Khaldiya	2025 FIFA Arab Cup
DF	Hazza Ali	9 June 1995 (age 31)	15	0	(Bahrain) Al-Khaldiya	2025 FIFA Arab Cup
DF	Mahmood Al-Moosawi	27 March 2004 (age 22)	3	0	(Bahrain) Al-Riffa	2025 FIFA Arab Cup
MF	Hussain Al-Eker	30 September 2001 (age 25)	4	0	(Bahrain) Al-Riffa	2025 FIFA Arab Cup
^{INJ} Withdrew due to injury^{PRE} Preliminary squad / standby^{RET} Retired from the national team^{SUS} Serving suspension^{WD} Player withdrew from the squad due to non-injury issue.

== Individual records ==
As of 5 June 2026
Players in bold are still active with Bahrain.

=== Most appearances ===
Rank	Player	Caps	Goals	Career
1	Sayed Mohammed Jaffer	163	0	2004–2024
2	Mohamed Husain	161	10	1997–2015
3	Salman Isa	160	24	2000–2012
4	Mohamed Salmeen	148	11	2000–2013
5	**Sayed Dhiya Saeed**	139	8	2011–present
6	Ismail Abdullatif (Note: Abdullatif also appeared in 6 matches that are not considered international 'A' matches by FIFA - including scoring two goals against Syria U-23s and Jordan Olympic team - therefore these matches are not counted here.)	138	48	2005–2025
7	**Waleed Al-Hayam**	133	0	2010–present
8	**Kamil Al-Aswad**	128	14	2015–present
9	Sayed Mahmood Jalal	125	6	1998–2010
10	Hussain Ali Baba	124	8	2001–2016

=== Top goalscorers ===
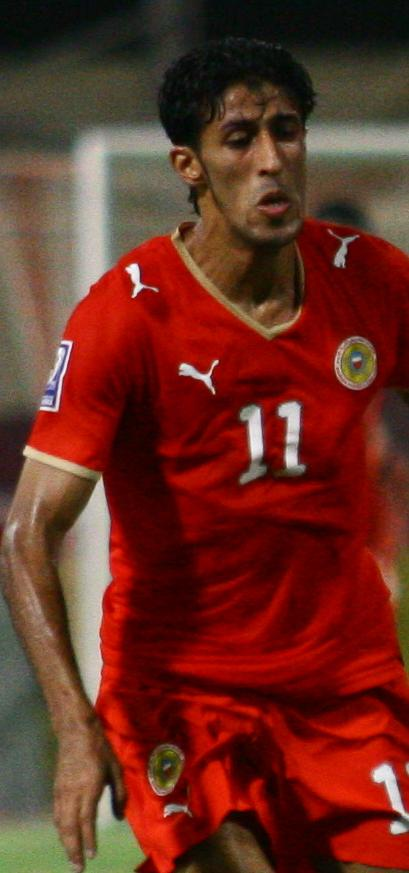
Ismail Abdullatif is Bahrain's top scorer with 48 goals.

Rank	Player	Goals	Caps	Ratio	Career
1	Ismail Abdullatif	48	138	0.35	2005–present
2	Husain Ali	33	115	0.29	1998–2013
3	Talal Yousef	28	118	0.24	1998–2009
4	A'ala Hubail	26	88	0.3	2003–2009
5	Salman Isa	24	160	0.15	2001–2012
6	**Mohamed Al-Romaihi**	20	62	0.32	2010–present
6	Faouzi Aaish	20	104	0.19	2004–2016
8	**Mohamed Marhoon**	19	87	0.22	2018–present
9	**Mahdi Abduljabbar**	15	54	0.28	2016–present
9	**Ali Madan**	15	111	0.14	2016–present

== Competitive record ==
=== FIFA World Cup ===
FIFA World Cup record										Qualification record					
Year	Round	Pos.	Pld	W	D	L	GF	GA	Squad	Pld	W	D	L	GF	GA
(Uruguay) 1930	Part of United Kingdom									Part of United Kingdom					
(Italy) 1934	Part of United Kingdom									Part of United Kingdom					
(France) 1938	Part of United Kingdom									Part of United Kingdom					
(Brazil) 1950	Part of United Kingdom									Part of United Kingdom					
(Switzerland) 1954	Part of United Kingdom									Part of United Kingdom					
(Sweden) 1958	Not a FIFA member									Not a FIFA member					
(Chile) 1962	Not a FIFA member									Not a FIFA member					
(England) 1966	Not a FIFA member									Not a FIFA member					
(Mexico) 1970	Did not enter									Did not enter					
(West Germany) 1974	Did not enter									Did not enter					
(Argentina) 1978	Did not qualify									4	1	0	3	4	6
(Spain) 1982	Did not qualify									4	1	0	3	1	6
(Mexico) 1986	Did not qualify									4	1	2	1	8	6
(Italy) 1990	Withdrew									Withdrew					
(United States) 1994	Did not qualify									8	3	3	2	9	6
(France) 1998	Did not qualify									4	1	0	3	3	9
(South Korea) (Japan) 2002	Did not qualify									14	7	4	3	17	13
(Germany) 2006	Did not qualify									16	5	6	5	21	14
(South Africa) 2010	Did not qualify									20	7	7	6	19	17
(Brazil) 2014	Did not qualify									6	2	3	1	13	7
(Russia) 2018	Did not qualify									8	3	0	5	10	10
(Qatar) 2022	Did not qualify									8	4	3	1	15	4
(Canada) (Mexico) (United States) 2026	Did not qualify									16	4	5	7	16	19
(Morocco) (Portugal) (Spain) 2030	To be determined									To be determined					
(Saudi Arabia) 2034	To be determined									To be determined					
Total		0/23	0	0	0	0	0	0	—	112	39	33	40	136	117

=== AFC Asian Cup ===
AFC Asian Cup record										Qualification record					
Year	Round	Pos.	Pld	W	D	L	GF	GA	Squad	Pld	W	D	L	GF	GA
(Hong Kong) 1956	Part of United Kingdom									Part of United Kingdom					
(South Korea) 1960	Part of United Kingdom									Part of United Kingdom					
1964	Part of United Kingdom									Part of United Kingdom					
(Iran) 1968	Did not enter									Did not enter					
(Thailand) 1972	Did not qualify									4	2	0	2	8	4
(Iran) 1976	Withdrew									Withdrew					
(Kuwait) 1980	Withdrew after qualifying									3	0	0	3	0	5
(Singapore) 1984	Withdrew									Withdrew					
(Qatar) 1988	Group stage	9th	4	0	2	2	1	3	Squad	3	2	1	0	4	0
(Japan) 1992	Did not qualify									2	0	0	2	1	5
(United Arab Emirates) 1996	Withdrew									Withdrew					
(Lebanon) 2000	Did not qualify									6	3	0	3	6	6
(China) 2004	Fourth place	4th	6	1	3	2	13	14	Squad	6	4	1	1	14	9
(Indonesia) (Malaysia) (Thailand) (Vietnam) 2007	Group stage	13th	3	1	0	2	3	7	Squad	4	1	1	2	3	6
(Qatar) 2011	Group stage	10th	3	1	0	2	6	5	Squad	6	4	0	2	12	6
(Australia) 2015	Group stage	12th	3	1	0	2	3	5	Squad	6	4	2	0	7	1
(United Arab Emirates) 2019	Round of 16	14th	4	1	1	2	3	4	Squad	14	7	1	6	25	13
(Qatar) 2023	Round of 16	15th	4	2	0	2	4	6	Squad	11	7	3	1	15	4
(Saudi Arabia) 2027	Qualified									6	3	2	1	11	3
Total	Fourth place	8/19	27	7	6	14	33	44	—	68	33	10	23	106	62

=== Arabian Gulf Cup ===
Arabian Gulf Cup record
Year	Round	Pos.	Pld	W	D	L	GF	GA	Squad
(Bahrain) 1970	Runners-up	2nd	3	1	1	1	3	4	
(Saudi Arabia) 1972	Record annulled								
(Kuwait) 1974	Group stage	5th	2	0	0	2	1	8	
(Qatar) 1976	Fourth place	4th	6	3	0	3	9	15	
(Iraq) 1979	Fourth place	4th	6	2	2	2	8	9	
(United Arab Emirates) 1982	Runners-up	2nd	5	3	1	1	10	7	
(Oman) 1984	Fifth place	5th	6	1	2	3	3	6	
(Bahrain) 1986	Fifth place	5th	6	1	4	1	4	5	
(Saudi Arabia) 1988	Fourth place	4th	6	3	0	3	4	4	
(Kuwait) 1990	Third place	3rd	4	1	2	1	1	1	
(Qatar) 1992	Runners-up	2nd	5	3	0	2	6	4	
(United Arab Emirates) 1994	Third place	3rd	5	1	3	1	5	6	
(Oman) 1996	Fifth place	5th	5	0	2	3	4	8	
(Bahrain) 1998	Fifth place	5th	5	0	3	2	3	6	
(Saudi Arabia) 2002	Fourth place	4th	5	1	2	2	4	6	
(Kuwait) 2003–04	Runners-up	2nd	6	4	1	1	13	3	
(Qatar) 2004	Third place	3rd	5	2	2	1	10	6	
(United Arab Emirates) 2007	Semi-finals	4th	4	1	1	2	4	5	
(Oman) 2009	Group stage	6th	3	1	0	2	3	4	Squad
(Yemen) 2010	Group stage	7th	3	0	1	2	4	7	Squad
(Bahrain) 2013	Fourth place	4th	5	1	1	3	4	9	Squad
(Saudi Arabia) 2014	Group stage	7th	3	0	2	1	0	3	Squad
(Kuwait) 2017–18	Semi-finals	4th	4	1	2	1	3	3	Squad
(Qatar) 2019	Champions	1st	5	2	2	1	7	6	Squad
(Iraq) 2023	Semi-finals	3rd	4	2	1	1	5	4	Squad
(Kuwait) 2024–25	Champions	1st	5	4	0	1	9	5	Squad
(Saudi Arabia) 2026	Group stage	8th	3	0	0	3	2	10	Squad
Total	Champions	27/27	119	38	35	46	120	149	—

=== Arab Cup ===
FIFA Arab Cup record
Year	Round	Pos.	Pld	W	D	L	GF	GA	Squad
(Lebanon) 1963	Did not enter								
(Kuwait) 1964	Did not enter								
(Iraq) 1966	Group stage	8th	4	0	1	3	7	25	Squad
(Saudi Arabia) 1985	Runners-up	2nd	4	1	2	1	4	3	Squad
(Jordan) 1988	Group stage	9th	4	0	3	1	2	3	Squad
(Syria) 1992	Did not enter								
(Qatar) 1998	Withdrew								
(Kuwait) 2002	Runners-up	2nd	6	3	1	2	8	5	Squad
(Saudi Arabia) 2012	Group stage	11th	3	0	0	3	1	8	Squad
(Qatar) 2021	Group stage	14th	3	0	1	2	0	4	Squad
(Qatar) 2025	Group stage	11th	3	1	0	2	5	8	Squad
Total	Runners-up	7/11	27	5	8	14	27	56	—

=== Asian Games ===
Asian Games record
Year	Round	Pos.	Pld	W	D	L	GF	GA
1951 to 1970	Did not enter							
(Iran) 1974	First round	14th	3	0	0	3	1	15
(Thailand) 1978	First round	14th	3	0	0	3	1	12
(India) 1982	Did not enter							
(South Korea) 1986	Group stage	12th	3	1	1	1	4	5
(China) 1990	Did not enter							
(Japan) 1994	Group stage	10th	4	1	2	1	6	5
(Thailand) 1998	Did not enter							
2002 to present	See Bahrain national under-23 football team							
Total	First round	4/13	14	3	3	8	12	37

=== Arab Games ===
Arab Games record
Year	Result	Pld	W	D	L	GF	GA
(Egypt) 1953	Did not enter						
(Lebanon) 1957	Did not enter						
(Morocco) 1961	Did not enter						
(United Arab Republic) 1965	Did not enter						
(Syria) 1976	Did not enter						
(Morocco) 1985	Did not enter						
(Lebanon) 1997	Did not enter						
(Jordan) 1999	First round	2	0	0	2	0	6
(Egypt) 2007	Did not enter						
(Qatar) 2011	Champions	4	3	1	0	9	3
2023 to present	See Bahrain national under-23 football team						
Total	2/10	6	3	1	2	9	9

=== WAFF Championship ===
WAFF Championship record
Year	Result	Pld	W	D	L	GF	GA	GD
(Jordan) 2000	Did not participate							
(Syria) 2002	Did not participate							
(Iran) 2004	Did not participate							
(Jordan) 2007	Did not participate							
(Iran) 2008	Did not participate							
(Jordan) 2010	Group stage	2	1	0	1	2	3	–1
(Kuwait) 2012	Fourth place	5	2	2	1	3	2	+1
(Qatar) 2014	Third place	4	0	3	1	0	1	–1
(Iraq) 2019	Champions	4	3	1	0	3	0	+3
(Oman) 2026	Qualified							
Total	5/10	15	6	6	3	8	6	+2

== Head-to-head record ==
As of 5 June 2026 after match against Georgia.

Positive Record Neutral Record Negative Record Invalid games

Against	Played	Won	Drawn	Lost	Goal scored	Goal against	% Won (Note: A draw counts as a ½ win)
Albania	2	2	0	0	6	0	100%
Algeria	3	0	2	1	1	5	33.33%
Angola	1	0	0	1	0	3	0%
Australia	8	1	1	6	4	13	12.5%
Azerbaijan	3	0	0	3	3	8	0%
Bangladesh	2	2	0	0	4	0	100%
Belarus	1	0	0	1	0	1	0%
Bosnia and Herzegovina	1	0	0	1	0	1	0%
Brazil	1	0	0	1	0	2	0%
Brunei	1	1	0	0	7	0	100%
Burkina Faso	2	2	0	0	5	2	100%
Burundi	1	1	0	0	1	0	100%
Cambodia	2	2	0	0	9	0	100%
Canada	1	0	1	0	2	2	0%
Cape Verde	1	0	0	1	1	2	0%
Chad	1	0	1	0	1	1	0%
Chile	1	0	0	1	0	2	0%
China	10	0	5	5	9	17	0%
Chinese Taipei	3	2	0	1	7	2	66.67%
Colombia	1	0	0	1	0	6	0%
Congo	1	1	0	0	3	1	100%
Curaçao	1	1	0	0	4	0	100%
Denmark	2	1	0	1	2	2	50%
Djibouti	1	1	0	0	1	0	100%
DR Congo	1	1	0	0	1	0	100%
Egypt	1	0	0	1	0	1	0%
Finland	5	0	1	4	1	9	0%
Georgia	1	0	0	1	0	2	0%
Haiti	1	1	0	0	6	1	100%
Hong Kong	7	5	1	1	17	3	71.43%
Iceland	2	1	0	1	2	3	50%
India	7	6	1	0	16	4	85.71%
Indonesia	9	3	3	3	21	10	33.33%
Iran	19	5	4	9	13	32	36.84%
Iraq	32	5	13	14	27	52	15.63%
Japan	15	2	1	12	11	33	13.33%
Jordan	31	11	6	14	26	35	35.48%
Kazakhstan	2	0	0	2	0	3	0%
Kenya	2	2	0	0	4	2	100%
Kuwait	44	14	11	19	41	59	31.82%
Kyrgyzstan	8	6	1	1	17	7	75%
Lebanon	15	7	6	2	23	18	66.67%
Libya	5	2	1	2	9	8	40%
Malaysia	16	9	5	2	34	17	56.25%
Maldives	2	2	0	0	5	1	100%
Mauritania	1	1	0	0	1	0	100%
Morocco	3	0	0	3	0	6	0%
Myanmar	5	4	0	1	13	6	80%
Netherlands	1	0	0	1	1	8	0%
Nepal	2	2	0	0	8	0	100%
New Zealand	5	0	1	4	1	6	0%
North Korea	7	2	1	4	10	10	28.57%
North Macedonia	1	0	1	0	1	1	0%
Norway	1	0	0	1	0	1	0%
Oman	40	12	17	11	37	33	51.25%
Pakistan	1	0	0	1	1	5	0%
Palestine	9	4	1	4	12	8	44.44%
Panama	2	1	0	1	5	2	50%
Paraguay	1	0	0	1	1	2	0%
Philippines	7	4	2	1	10	5	71.43%
Qatar	40	11	12	9	30	34	42.5%
Saudi Arabia	39	7	12	20	26	57	17.95%
Serbia	1	0	0	1	1	5	0%
Singapore	10	8	1	1	18	6	80%
Slovakia	1	1	0	0	2	0	100%
South Korea	25	3	5	17	21	58	12%
Somalia	1	0	0	1	1	2	0%
Sri Lanka	1	1	0	0	1	0	100%
Sudan	4	3	0	1	7	4	75%
Sweden	2	0	0	2	0	5	0%
Syria	23	6	7	10	24	25	26.09%
Tajikistan	5	3	2	0	11	1	80%
Thailand	10	3	4	3	11	10	30%
Togo (Note: The team saying to represent Togo was made of impostors as part of a match-fixing scheme involving the match's referee, Ibrahim Chaibou of Niger, and Singaporean businessman Wilson Raj Perumal. In January 2019, FIFA banned Chaibou for life from any football-linked activity.)	1	1	0	0	5	1	100%
Trinidad and Tobago	2	0	1	1	1	2	0%
Tunisia	2	1	0	1	1	3	50%
Turkmenistan	6	4	2	0	15	5	83.33%
Uganda	2	1	1	0	3	1	50%
Ukraine	1	0	1	0	1	1	0%
United Arab Emirates	32	12	6	14	46	53	37.5%
Uzbekistan	11	2	5	4	8	15	45.45%
Vietnam	1	0	0	1	3	5	0%
Yemen	16	12	2	2	31	8	86.67%
Zimbabwe	1	1	0	0	5	2	100%
Total	626	222	164	240	771	799	35.46

== Honours ==
=== Regional ===
- Arabian Gulf Cup
  - (gold) Champions (2): 2019, 2024–25
  - (silver) Runners-up (4): 1970, 1982, 1992, 2003
  - (bronze) Third place (3): 1990, 1994, 2004
- WAFF Championship
  - (gold) Champions (1): 2019
  - (bronze) Third place (1): 2014
- Arab Games
  - (gold) Gold medal (1): 2011
- Arab Cup
  - (silver) Runners-up (2): 1985, 2002
