= Khalifa International Stadium =

Multi-purpose stadium in Al Rayyan, Qatar

- استاد خليفة الدولي (Arabic)
- Interactive map of Khalifa International Stadium
- Location: Al Waab Street 7C7X+C8Q; Al Rayyan, Qatar
- Coordinates: 25°15′49″N 51°26′53″E
- Owner: Qatar Football Association
- Capacity: 45,857
- Surface: Grass
- Record attendance: 45,344 (England vs Iran, 21 November 2022)
- Public transit: Sport City (المدينة الرياضية)

Construction
- Opened: 1976
- Renovated: 2005, 2017
- Architect: Dar Al-Handasah (2017)

Tenant
- Qatar national football team (1976–present)

Khalifa International Stadium (/kəˈliːfə/, Arabic: استاد خليفة الدولي, ALA-LC: Istād Khalīfah al-Duwalī) is a multi-purpose stadium located in Al Rayyan, Qatar, around 9 kilometres (5.6 miles) west from the centre of Doha. Its ground comprises a running track and a grass pitch. Opened in 1976, the stadium was named after then Emir of Qatar Khalifa bin Hamad Al Thani. Under the ownership of the Qatar Football Association, it serves as the primary home ground of the Qatar men's national football team. Its current fully-roofed, 45,857-seat configuration was opened in 2017, following a previous reconfiguration in 2005 that incorporated the stadium into the Aspire Zone complex and added a roofed grandstand; boosting its capacity from 20,000 to 40,000.

Khalifa has hosted numerous international association football and athletics events throughout its history. Track and field events at the 2006 Asian Games, 2011 Pan Arab Games, and 2019 World Athletics Championships were held at the stadium, and World Athletics has since organised the annual Doha Diamond League event there as part of its Diamond League series. In the future, Khalifa is planned to host track and field events at the 2030 Asian Games. In association football, the stadium hosted matches during the 2022 FIFA World Cup, the 2019 FIFA Club World Cup, the 1995 FIFA World Youth Championship, the 2011 and 2023 AFC Asian Cup, and three editions of the Arabian Gulf Cup. The final of the Emir of Qatar Cup is also occasionally played at the stadium.

== History ==
Khalifa International Stadium opened in 1976, ahead of the 4th Arabian Gulf Cup, with a mostly symmetrical stadium bowl and a basic roof covering the upper seats of the stadium's western stand. The stadium hosted all 22 games of the tournament, which was won by Kuwait. Sixteen years later, the stadium once again hosted all 15 games of the 11th Arabian Gulf Cup in 1992, which saw hosts Qatar win the Arabian Gulf Cup the very first time.

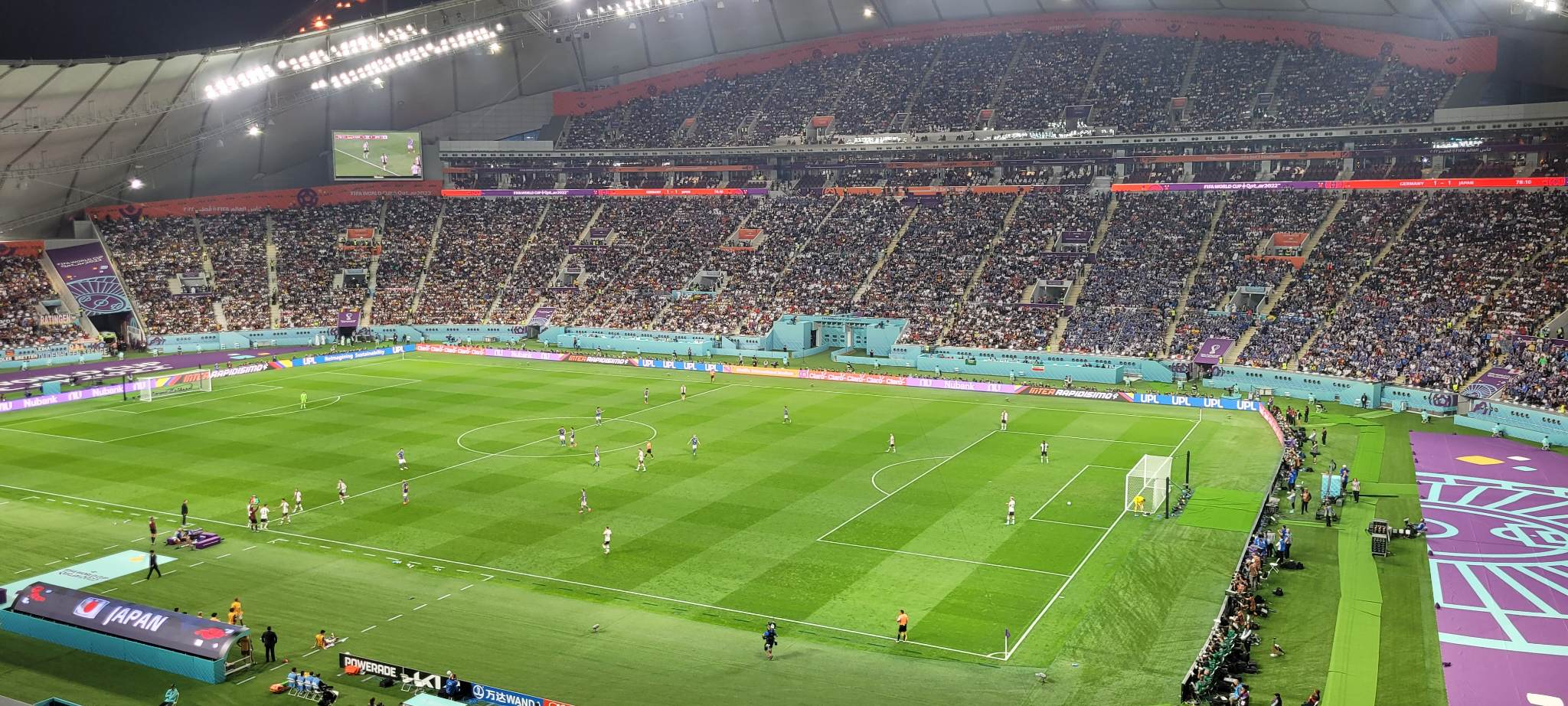
Interior view towards the northeast during a World Cup football match in November 2022

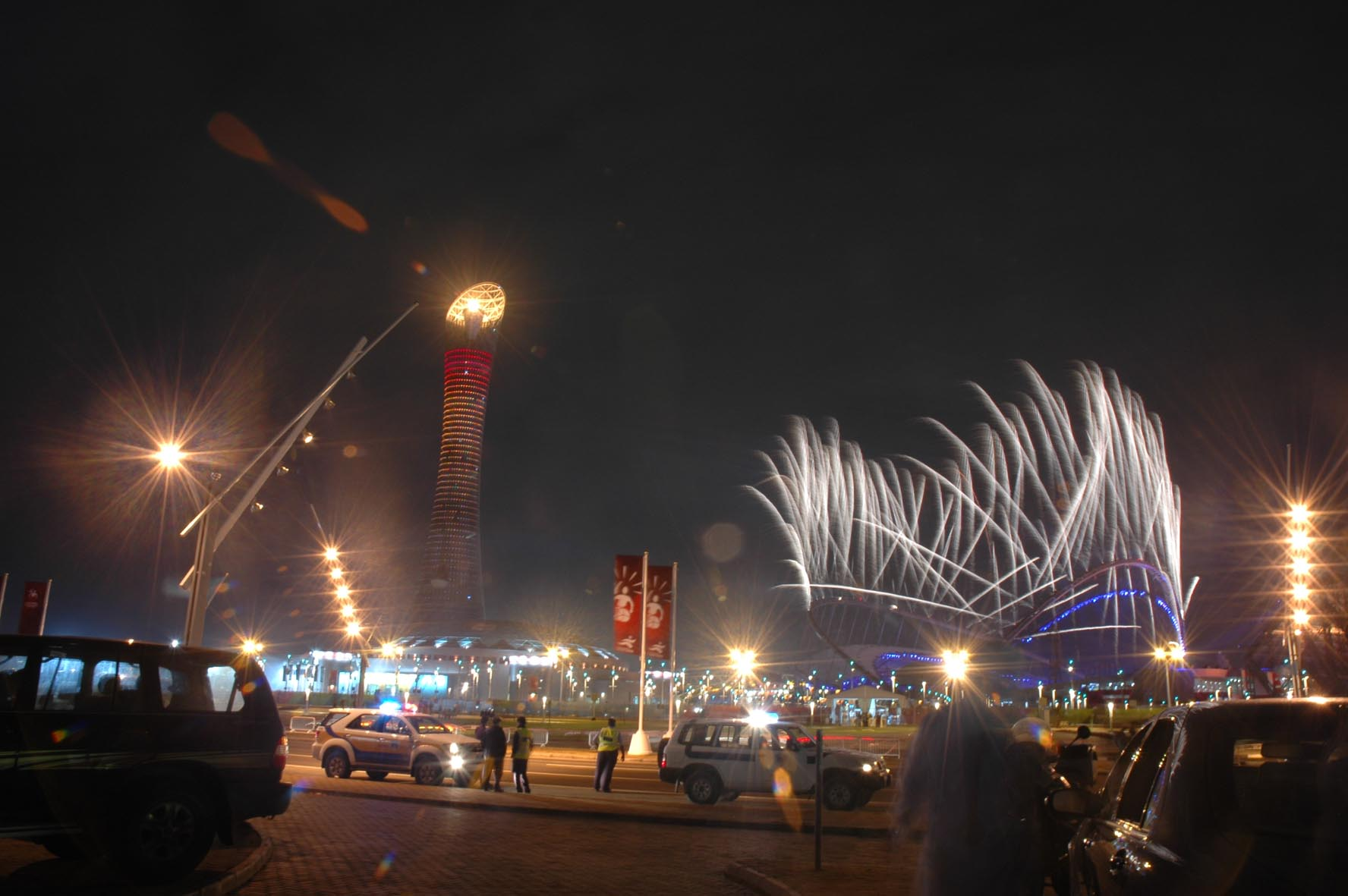
Fireworks during the 2006 Asian Games opening ceremony.

In preparation for Doha's hosting of the 2006 Asian Games, Khalifa International Stadium was renovated with a complete remodelling of the stadium's western stand, which transformed it into a grandstand with a second tier and a new roof that covered all the seats. Over the eastern side, a large arch with additional light fixtures were added, which was used as a platform; this was used during the games' opening ceremony to launch fireworks from. The stadium's reconfiguration in 2005 was part of the larger Doha Sports City urban renewal project in Al Rayyan, later known as the Aspire Zone complex. Today, it includes the Aspire Academy, Hamad Aquatic Centre, and the Aspire Tower. The ceremonies and track and field events of the 2011 Pan Arab Games were also held at Khalifa a few years later.

After the rights to host the 2022 FIFA World Cup were awarded to Qatar in December 2010, Khalifa International Stadium was reconfigured again to stage matches during the tournament. An initial plan to upgrade the stadium's capacity to at least 68,000 was mulled but later revised. The final design by international architecture firm Dar Al-Handasah saw the stadium's capacity boosted to 45,857, with the addition of a new tier on the eastern stand and a new roof covering the entire stadium. Upon its reopening in 2017, it became the first stadium to receive a four-star rating from the FIFA-endorsed Global Sustainability Assessment System of the Middle East and North Africa, and was the first of the eight venues of the FIFA World Cup to open. Since its reopening, the stadium hosted the 2019 World Athletics Championships, and three matches of the 2019 FIFA Club World Cup, including its final.

== Speciality ==
Khalifa International stadium was the first one to get inaugurated during last year's Amir cup finals. It has long been the cornerstone of the country's sporting tradition with its unique geography and advanced transport systems.

Khalifa International stadium has set a benchmark. However, its most significant feature is its roof which covers over 70 per cent of the stadium. The roof is designed with EFTE and PTFE materials. Although it is not retractable like other stadiums, it can still provide sufficient shade for fans.However, the distinctive feature of the Khalifa Stadium is its two roof arches. These arches are located on the east and west side of the stadium, which is over 120 metres (390 ft) high. Furthermore, it is also fitted with cooling units that span around the stadium.

The cooling system can drop the temperature down to 24 degrees during matches. In addition, the latest renovation also saw the installation of LED pitch lights and a digital floodlight.

== Renovation ==
The Supreme Committee for Delivery & Legacy (SC) and the Aspire Zone Foundation collaborated to renovate the stadium, which got underway in 2014. It involved building a sports museum (3-2-1 Qatar Olympic and Sports Museum), expanding the east wing of the stadium's stands to accommodate 48,000 spectators, adding hospitality and VIP suites, installing a state-of-the-art roof that covers every stand in the stadium, and installing cooling technology that uses 40% less energy than traditional stadium cooling technology to maintain the field's ideal temperature of 26 degrees all year round.

== International matches ==
=== Tournament results ===
==== 1998 Arab Cup ====
| Date | Time(QST) | Team #1 | Result | Team #2 | Round | Attendance |
|---|---|---|---|---|---|---|
| 1 October 1998 | 21:00 | Kuwait | 4–1 | United Arab Emirates | Third place | 25,000 |
| 1 October 1998 | 23:00 | Saudi Arabia | 3–1 | Qatar | Final | 25,000 |

==== 2011 AFC Asian Cup ====
The Khalifa International Stadium hosted six matches during the 2011 AFC Asian Cup, including the final.

| Date | Time(QST) | Team #1 | Result | Team #2 | Round | Attendance |
|---|---|---|---|---|---|---|
| 7 January 2011 | 19:15 | Qatar | 0–2 | Uzbekistan | Group A | 37,143 |
| 12 January 2011 | 19:15 | China | 0–2 | Qatar | Group A | 30,778 |
| 16 January 2011 | 19:15 | Qatar | 3–0 | Kuwait | Group A | 28,339 |
| 21 January 2011 | 19:25 | Uzbekistan | 2–1 | Jordan | Quarter-finals | 16,073 |
| 25 January 2011 | 19:25 | Uzbekistan | 0–6 | Australia | Semi-finals | 24,826 |
| 29 January 2011 | 18:00 | Australia | 0–1 | Japan | Final | 37,174 |

==== 24th Arabian Gulf Cup (2019) ====
| Date | Time (AST) | Team #1 | Result | Team #2 | Round | Attendance |
|---|---|---|---|---|---|---|
| 26 November 2019 | 19:30 | Qatar | 1–2 | Iraq | Group A | 37,890 |
| 29 November 2019 | 17:30 | United Arab Emirates | 0–2 | Iraq | Group A | 17,437 |
| 29 November 2019 | 19:30 | Yemen | 0–6 | Qatar | Group A | 26,392 |
| 2 December 2019 | 17:30 | Qatar | 4–2 | United Arab Emirates | Group A | TBD |
| 2 December 2019 | 20:00 | Kuwait | 2–4 | Bahrain | Group B | TBD |

==== 2022 FIFA World Cup ====
The Khalifa International Stadium hosted eight matches during the 2022 FIFA World Cup, including the third place play-off.

| Date | Time(QST) | Team #1 | Result | Team #2 | Round | Attendance |
|---|---|---|---|---|---|---|
| 21 November 2022 | 16:00 | England | 6–2 | Iran | Group B | 45,344 |
| 23 November 2022 | 16:00 | Germany | 1–2 | Japan | Group E | 42,608 |
| 25 November 2022 | 19:00 | Netherlands | 1–1 | Ecuador | Group A | 44,833 |
| 27 November 2022 | 19:00 | Croatia | 4–1 | Canada | Group F | 44,374 |
| 29 November 2022 | 18:00 | Ecuador | 1–2 | Senegal | Group A | 44,569 |
| 1 December 2022 | 22:00 | Japan | 2–1 | Spain | Group E | 44,851 |
| 3 December 2022 | 18:00 | Netherlands | 3–1 | United States | Round of 16 | 44,846 |
| 17 December 2022 | 18:00 | Croatia | 2–1 | Morocco | Third place play-off | 44,137 |

==== 2023 AFC Asian Cup ====
On 5 April 2023, the Khalifa International Stadium was chosen as one of nine (then eight) venues for the 2023 AFC Asian Cup in Qatar.

| Date | Local time | Team #1 | Result | Team #2 | Round | Attendance |
|---|---|---|---|---|---|---|
| 14 January 2024 | 17:30 | United Arab Emirates | 3–1 | Hong Kong | Group C | 15,586 |
| 16 January 2024 | 20:30 | Saudi Arabia | 2–1 | Oman | Group F | 41,987 |
| 19 January 2024 | 20:30 | Hong Kong | 0–1 | Iran | Group C | 36,412 |
| 22 January 2024 | 18:00 | Qatar | 1–0 | China | Group A | 42,104 |
| 25 January 2024 | 14:30 | Jordan | 0–1 | Bahrain | Group E | 39,650 |
| 29 January 2024 | 14:30 | Iraq | 2–3 | Jordan | Round of 16 | 35,814 |

==== 2025 FIFA U-17 World Cup ====
The Khalifa international Stadium Stadium hosted the 2025 FIFA U-17 World Cup , with the final match taking place between Portugal, winners of 2025 UEFA European Under-17 Championship, and Austria.

| Date | Local time | Team No. 1 | Result | Team No. 2 | Round | Attendance |
|---|---|---|---|---|---|---|
| 27 November 2025 | 19:00 | Portugal | 1–0 | Austria | Final | 41,978 |

==== 2025 FIFA Arab Cup ====
On 24 May 2025, the Khalifa International Stadium was chosen as one of six venues for the 2025 FIFA Arab Cup in Qatar.

| Date | Local time | Team #1 | Result | Team #2 | Round | Attendance |
|---|---|---|---|---|---|---|
| 2 December 2025 | 15:00 | Morocco | 3–1 | Comoros | Group B | 10,246 |
| 4 December 2025 | 20:00 | Syria | 1–1 | Qatar | Group A | 42,467 |
| 6 December 2025 | 16:30 | Bahrain | 1–5 | Algeria | Group D | 20,260 |
| 9 December 2025 | 20:00 | Algeria | 2–0 | Iraq | Group D | 34,148 |
| 11 December 2025 | 17:30 | Morocco | 1–0 | Syria | Quarter-finals | 39,167 |
| 15 December 2025 | 17:30 | Morocco | 3–0 | United Arab Emirates | Semi-finals | 33,898 |
| 18 December 2025 | 14:00 | Saudi Arabia | 0–0; Abandoned (Note: After the first half ended 0–0, the match was abandoned before the resumption of the second half, following a decision of the referee, who took into consideration the length of time of the stoppage of the match due to uncertain adverse weather conditions and the associated player welfare considerations. Later that day, FIFA decided to declare Saudi Arabia and the United Arab Emirates joint third-place winners.) | United Arab Emirates | Third place playoff | 32,768 |

=== Friendly ===
| Date | Time (QST) | Team #1 | Result | Team #2 |
|---|---|---|---|---|
| 14 November 2009 | 19:15 | Brazil | 1–0 | England |
| 17 November 2010 | 19:15 | Brazil | 0–1 | Argentina |
| 18 November 2010 | 18:00 | Qatar | 0–1 | Haiti |
| 16 December 2010 | 18:00 | Qatar | 2–1 | Egypt |
| 22 December 2010 | 16:00 | Qatar | 2–0 | Estonia |
| 28 December 2010 | 19:15 | Qatar | 0–0 | Iran |
| 6 February 2013 | 21:00 | Spain | 3–1 | Uruguay |
| 7 September 2018 | 19:00 | Qatar | 1–0 | China |
| 11 September 2018 | 19:00 | Qatar | 3–0 | Palestine |
| 31 December 2018 | 20:00 | Qatar | 1–2 | Iran |

== Notes ==
Events and tenants
| Preceded by Busan Asiad Main Stadium; Busan | Asian Games; Opening and closing ceremonies 2006 | Succeeded by Haixinsha Island; Guangzhou |
| Preceded by Busan Asiad Main Stadium; Busan | Asian Games; Athletics tournament Main venue 2006 | Succeeded by Guangdong Olympic Stadium; Guangzhou |
| Preceded by Gelora Bung Karno Stadium; Jakarta | AFC Asian Cup; Final venue 2011 | Succeeded by Stadium Australia; Sydney |
| Preceded by London Stadium; London | World Athletics Championships; 2019 | Succeeded by Hayward Field; Eugene |
| Preceded by Paloma Mizuho Stadium; Nagoya | Asian Games; Opening and closing ceremonies 2030 | Succeeded by King Fahd International Stadium; Riyadh |
| Preceded by Paloma Mizuho Stadium; Nagoya | Asian Games; Athletics tournament Main venue 2030 | Succeeded by King Fahd International Stadium; Riyadh |
