= Ahmed Tabanja =

Sudanese footballer (born 2000)

Personal information
- Full name: Ahmed Abdelmunem Yousef
- Date of birth: 2 September 2000 (age 26)
- Place of birth: Khartoum North, Sudan
- Height: 1.75 m (5 ft 9 in)
- Position: Left-back

Team information
- Current team: Al Merrikh
- Number: 13

Senior career*
Years	Team	Apps	(Gls)
2017–2020	Al-Quoz SC (Khartoum)		
2020–	Al Merrikh		

International career^{‡}
2021–	Sudan	21	(0)
- * Club domestic league appearances and goals as of 23:55, 2 January 2020 (UTC) ‡ National team caps and goals as of 23:55, 12 November 2026 (UTC)

Ahmed Tabanja Ahmed Abdelmunem Yousef (Arabic: أحمد طبنجة; born 2 September 2000) is a Sudanese professional footballer who plays as a left-back for Sudan Premier League club Al Merrikh and the Sudan national team.

== Club career ==
Tabanja began his senior career with Sudan Premier League club Khartoum in 2017. On 2 January 2020, he transferred to Al Merrikh on a 4-year contract. He was named Player of the Tournament for the 2024–25 Sudan Premier League season.

== International career ==
Tabanja was called up to the Sudan national team for the 2025 FIFA Arab Cup. The following month, he was called up to the 2025 Africa Cup of Nations.

== Honours ==
Al Merrikh

- Sudan Premier League: 2019–20
