= Hélio Sousa =

Portuguese footballer and manager

Personal information
- Full name: Hélio Filipe Dias de Sousa
- Date of birth: 12 August 1969 (age 57)
- Place of birth: Setúbal, Portugal
- Height: 1.79 m (5 ft 10 in)
- Position: Midfielder

Team information
- Current team: Kuwait (manager)

Youth career
- 1980–1981: Brejos Azeitão
- 1981–1987: Vitória Setúbal

Senior career*
Years	Team	Apps	(Gls)
1987–2005	Vitória Setúbal	423	(21)

International career
1989	Portugal U20	6	(0)
1990–1992	Portugal U21	19	(0)
1994	Portugal	1	(0)

Managerial career
- 2005–2007: Vitória Setúbal
- 2008–2009: Covilhã
- 2010–2019: Portugal (youth)
- 2019–2023: Bahrain
- 2023–2024: Qatar SC
- 2025–: Kuwait
Medal record
Men's football
Representing Portugal
FIFA U-20 World Cup
Winner	1989 Saudi Arabia
- * Club domestic league appearances and goals

Hélio Filipe Dias de Sousa CvIH (born 12 August 1969) is a Portuguese professional football manager and former player who played as a central midfielder. He is the manager of the Kuwait national team.

He spent his entire career at Vitória de Setúbal, and was part of the Portugal squad that won the 1989 FIFA World Youth Championship. He started working as a manager in 2005.

== Playing career ==
Known by his first name in his playing days, Hélio was born in Setúbal and played his entire career with hometown club Vitória Futebol Clube. Being team captain from an early age, he first appeared with the main squad during the 1987–88 season, and went on to experience promotions and relegations alike throughout 18 professional campaigns, being an undisputed starter in ten of those (three in the Segunda Liga).

Hélio retired at almost 36, after helping Vitória to the 2005 Taça de Portugal in a 2–1 final win against S.L. Benfica, having played 423 league games – club best – and scoring 21 goals. Internationally, he was part of Portugal's squad at the 1989 FIFA World Youth Championship, which was won in Saudi Arabia; in 1994, he earned one cap for the full side.

== Coaching career ==
After retiring, Sousa moved into management. Beginning with his only professional club, he moved in 2008–09 to S.C. Covilhã, helping it retain its second-tier status.

Sousa took the reins of the national team's under-18s in August 2010. He was in charge of several youth categories at the Portuguese Football Federation in the following years.

On 29 July 2018, Sousa led the under-19 team to their first-ever UEFA European Championship after a 4–3 extra time defeat of Italy in Seinäjoki. The following March, he replaced Miroslav Soukup at the helm of Bahrain, but was still in charge of the Portuguese under-20s at the 2019 World Cup, which ended in group stage elimination.

On 14 August 2019, Sousa led Bahrain to their first ever regional title after defeating Iraq 1–0 in the WAFF Championship. On 8 December, he was also on the bench as the team won their first Arabian Gulf Cup, 1–0 against Saudi Arabia. He left his position in July 2023, at the end of his contract.

Sousa was appointed at Qatar Stars League club Qatar SC on a two-year deal in October 2023. He returned to national-team duties on 31 July 2025, becoming head coach of Kuwait.

== Honours ==
=== Player ===
Vitória Setúbal

- Taça de Portugal: 2004–05

Portugal

- FIFA U-20 World Cup: 1989

=== Manager ===
Vitória Setúbal

- Taça de Portugal runner-up: 2005–06

Portugal U17

- UEFA European Under-17 Championship: 2016

Portugal U19

- UEFA European Under-19 Championship: 2018

Bahrain

- WAFF Championship: 2019
- Arabian Gulf Cup: 2019

== See also ==
- List of one-club men
