= Amine Benaddi =

Bahraini professional footballer

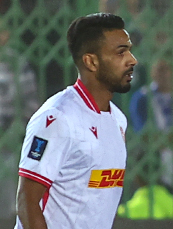
- Amine Benaddi with Al-Muharraq SC in 2025

Personal information
- Birth name: Amine Mohamad Hassan Benaddi
- Date of birth: May 9, 1993 (age 33)
- Place of birth: El Jadida, Morocco
- Height: 1.87 m (6 ft 1 1/2 in)
- Position: Centre-back

Team information
- Current team: Muharraq
- Number: 5

Senior career*
Years	Team	Apps	(Gls)
2011–2015	Difaâ Hassani Jadidi		
2015	Budaiya		
2015–2016	Difaâ Hassani Jadidi		
2016–2019	Budaiya		
2019–	Muharraq		

International career^{‡}
2022–	Bahrain	21	(1)
Medal record
Men's football
Representing Bahrain
Arabian Gulf Cup
Winner	2024 Kuwait
- * Club domestic league appearances and goals as of 06:15, 10 January 2024 (UTC) ‡ National team caps and goals as of 06:15, 10 January 2024 (UTC)

Amine Mohamad Hassan Benaddi (Arabic: أَمِين مُحَمَّد حَسَن بِنْعَدِيّ; born 9 May 1993) is a professional footballer who plays as a centre-back for Muharraq. Born in Morocco, he plays for the Bahrain national team.

== Career ==
Benaddi began his senior career in Morocco with Difaâ Hassani Jadidi in 2011. On 12 January 2015, he moved to the Bahraini club Budaiya, but shortly after returned to DHJ in Morocco. On 21 August 2016, he returned once more to Budaiya in Bahrain and stayed with them until 2019. On 5 August 2019 he transferred to Muharraq on a 5-year contract. On 6 July 2023 he extended his contract with Muharraq.

== International ==
Born in Morocco, Benaddi was naturalized as Bahrani in December 2021 after 5 years of residency and received a call-up for their national team. He debuted for the Bahrain national team in a 2–1 friendly win over India on 23 March 2022. He was called up to the national team for the 2023 AFC Asian Cup.

== Honours ==
Al-Muharraq

- King's Cup: 2019–20
- Bahraini FA Cup: 2021, 2022
- AFC Champions League Two: 2021
