= Vincent Emmanuel =

Bahraini footballer (born 2001)

Personal information
- Full name: Vincent Emmanuel Ani Tochukwu
- Date of birth: 2 April 2001 (age 25)
- Place of birth: Nigeria
- Height: 1.83 m (6 ft 0 in)
- Position: Right-back

Team information
- Current team: Sitra
- Number: 31

Senior career*
Years	Team	Apps	(Gls)
2018–2022	Al-Najma		
2022–2023	Sitra		
2023–2024	Al-Khaldiya		
2023–2024	→East Riffa (loan)		
2024–	Sitra		

International career^{‡}
2024–	Bahrain	10	(0)
- * Club domestic league appearances and goals as of 03:18, 13 June 2025 (UTC) ‡ National team caps and goals as of 03:18, 13 June 2025 (UTC)

Vincent Emmanuel Ani Tochukwu (Arabic: فنسنت إيمانويل; born 29 April 2001) is a professional footballer who plays as a right-back for Bahraini Premier League club Sitra. Born in Nigeria, he plays for the Bahrain national team.

== Club career ==
Emmanuel began his senior career in Bahrain with Al-Najma in 2018. After four seasons there, moved to Sitra in 2022. On 8 July 2023, he transferred to Al-Khaldiya and immediately went on loan to East Riffa.

== International career ==
Born in Nigeria, Emmanuel moved to Bahrain at a young age and was naturalized as Bahraini. He was first called up to the Bahrain national team for a set of 2026 FIFA World Cup qualification matches in September 2024.
