= Waleed Al Hayam =

Bahraini footballer

Personal information
- Full name: Waleed Mohamed Abdulla Ali Al Hayam
- Date of birth: 3 February 1991 (age 35)
- Place of birth: Muharraq, Bahrain
- Height: 1.81 m (5 ft 11 in)
- Positions: Defender; midfielder

Team information
- Current team: Al-Muharraq
- Number: 3

Senior career*
| Years | Team | Apps | (Gls) |
| 2009– | Al-Muharraq | 300+ | (0) |

International career^{‡}
| 2010– | Bahrain | 130 | (0) |
Medal record
Men's football
Representing Bahrain
Gulf Cup
| Winner | 2019 Qatar |
| Winner | 2024 Kuwait |
Men's football
Representing Bahrain
2019 WAFF Championship
| Winner | 2019 Iraq |
- * Club domestic league appearances and goals ‡ National team caps and goals as of 6 May 2024

Waleed Mohamed Abdulla Ali Al Hayam (born 3 February 1991 in Muharraq, Bahrain) is a Bahraini footballer. He is currently playing for Al-Muharraq in the Bahraini Premier League as a defender. He was called up to the Bahrain national team at 2011 AFC Asian Cup, hosted by neighboring country Qatar.
