= Abdulla Al-Khulasi =

Bahraini footballer

Personal information
- Full name: Abdulla Sultan Ahmed Mohamed Ahmed Al-Khulasi
- Date of birth: 2 September 2003 (age 23)
- Place of birth: Manama, Bahrain
- Height: 1.81 m (5 ft 11 1/2 in)
- Position: Centre back

Youth career
- 2019–2021: Al-Muharraq

Senior career*
Years	Team	Apps	(Gls)
2022–	Al-Muharraq		

International career
2022–	Bahrain U23	4	(0)
2023–	Bahrain	16	(0)
- * Club domestic league appearances and goals as of 28 March 2025

Abdulla Sultan Ahmed Muhammad Ahmed Al-Khulasi (Arabic: عبد الله سلطان أحمد محمد أحمد الخلاسي; born 2 September 2003) is a Bahraini footballer who plays as a left-back for Bahraini Premier League club Al-Muharraq and the Bahrain national team.

== Club career ==
Al-Khulasi began his youth career in the academy setup of Al-Muharraq. During the 2021-22 season he started transitioning into the senior training environment, making occasional first-team appearances.

He officially signed a first-team contract with Al-Muharraq on 1 July 2022 ahead of the 2022-23 season. He was primarily played as a left-back occasionally shifting into a centre-back. He quickly consolidated his place as a reliable component of the team's backline. In 2023, after his debut season, Al-Muharraq extended his contract for five years.

Al-Khulasi featured in the 2024-25 squad that won the Bahraini Premier League for the first time in 7 years where they conceded 17 goals in 22 games. He retained the league title in the 2025–26 season where they conceded 7 goals in 22 games, the fewest in the league. During the 2025-26 season he also won the Bahraini King's Cup for the 20th time.

== International career ==
On 10 January 2023, Al-Khulasi made his debut for the Bahrain national team, in a 2–1 victory over Qatar in the Arabian Gulf Cup. On 28 March 2023, he scored his debut goal for the national team, in a 1–0 victory against Syria in a friendly match.

In 2024, he was called up for the Bahrain national team for the World Cup 2026 qualification.

In December 2024, he was called up for Bahrain national team for the 26th Arabian Gulf Cup. During the tournament he started in four of five games including the semi-final and final where he won his first international trophy.

== Honours ==
Bahrain

- Arabian Gulf Cup: 2024–25

Al-Muharraq SC

- Bahraini Premier League: 2024–25, 2025–26
- Bahraini King's Cup: 2025-26
