= Ebrahim Lutfalla =

Bahraini professional footballer

Personal information
- Birth name: Ebrahim Khalil Ebrahim Abdulla Lutfalla
- Date of birth: September 24, 1992 (age 34)
- Place of birth: Manama, Bahrain
- Height: 1.87 m (6 ft 1 1/2 in)
- Position: Goalkeeper

Team information
- Current team: Al-Muharraq

Senior career*
Years	Team	Apps	(Gls)
2010–2013	Al-Shabab Club		
2012	→Al-Hidd (loan)		
2013–2015	Al-Najma		
2015–2016	Al-Hidd		
2016–2017	East Riffa Club		
2017–2020	Al-Hala		
2020–2022	Al-Khaldiya		
2022–2025	Al-Ahli Club		
2025-	Al-Muharraq		

International career^{‡}
2013–	Bahrain	34	(0)
Medal record
Men's football
Representing Bahrain
Arabian Gulf Cup
Winner	2024 Kuwait
- * Club domestic league appearances and goals as of 06:15, 10 January 2024 (UTC) ‡ National team caps and goals as of 4 January 2025

Ebrahim Khalil Ebrahim Abdulla Lutfalla (Arabic: إِبْرَاهِيم خَلِيل إِبْرَاهِيم عَبْد الله لُطْف الله; born 24 September 1992) is a Bahraini professional footballer who plays as a goalkeeper for Al-Muharraq SC, and the Bahrain national team.

== Career ==
Lutfalla began his senior career in the Bahraini Premier League with Al-Shabab Club, before moving to Al-Najma on 4 August 2013. After one season with them, he moved to Al-Hidd where he won the 2015–16 Bahrain First Division League. He followed that up with a yearlong stint with East Riffa Club, before moving to Al-Hala in 2017. On 7 December 2020, he was announced as one of the first players for the newly established club Al-Khaldiya. The next season, he moved to Al-Ahli Club on 2 July 2022.

== International ==
Lufalla debuted for the Bahrain national team in a 2–0 2015 AFC Asian Cup qualification win over Yemen on 6 February 2013. He was Bahrain's starting goalkeeper at the 25th Arabian Gulf Cup in 2023. He was called up to the national team for the 2023 AFC Asian Cup.

== Honours ==
Al-Hidd

- Bahraini Premier League: 2015–16
- Bahraini Super Cup: 2016

Al-Ahli Club

- Bahraini King's Cup: 2024

Bahrain

- Arabian Gulf Cup: 2024–25

Individual

- Arabian Gulf Cup Best Goalkeeper: 2024–25
