= Zaid Ismail =

Iraqi footballer (born 2002)

- Ismail with Iraq in 2025

Personal information
- Full name: Zaid Ismail Al-Dulaimi
- Date of birth: 3 January 2002 (age 24)
- Place of birth: Diyala, Iraq
- Height: 1.85 m (6 ft 1 in)
- Position: Defensive midfielder

Team information
- Current team: Al-Talaba
- Number: 6

Senior career*
Years	Team	Apps	(Gls)
2017–2020	Al-Naft		
2020–2022	Diyala		
2022–2024	Newroz		
2024–	Al-Talaba	49	(5)

International career^{‡}
2023–2024	Iraq U23	11	(0)
2025–	Iraq	4	(0)
Medal record
Men's football
Representing Iraq
AFC U-23 Asian Cup
Third place	2024 Qatar	Team
- * Club domestic league appearances and goals as of 3 April 2026 ‡ National team caps and goals as of 3 April 2026

Zaid Ismail Al-Dulaimi (Arabic: زيد اسماعيل الدليمي; born 3 January 2002) is an Iraqi professional footballer who plays as a defensive midfielder for Iraqi club Al-Talaba and the Iraq national team.

== Club career ==
=== Early career ===
Zaid first started getting regular playing time at local club Diyala in the Iraqi second division, where he quickly became their most important player, leading them to a top-half finish in his final season at the club in 2022, before moving up to Iraq's top tier with Kurdish club Newroz, where he also quickly established himself as a key player.

=== Al-Talaba ===
In January 2024, Iraqi giants Al-Talaba signed Ismail.

Zaid started the 2025–26 Stars League season strongly, scoring against Zakho in the opening game and establishing himself as a key player for Al-Talaba, playing 20 out of their opening 22 matches, while registering 4 goal involvements.

In early 2026, reports quickly started circulating all across Iraqi social media pages and channels that Saudi Pro League side Al-Najma were in talks to sign the midfielder, but no move materialised before the winter transfer window closed.

== International career ==
=== Iraq U-23 ===
Zaid received his first international call-ups in March and July 2023 with the Iraq U-23s during their preparations for the U-23 Asian Cup qualifiers.

=== Iraq ===
Zaid broke into the Iraqi national team at the 2025 FIFA Arab Cup, where he made his debut and a further two appearances, putting down big performances and being a standout for Iraq during the tournament.

Following the Arab Cup, Ismail was called up to Iraq's squad to face Bolivia in Mexico for a play-off match which would determine the final spot at the 2026 FIFA World Cup, where he went on to play as Iraq won the match to qualify for their first World Cup in 40 years.

== Career Statistics ==
=== Club ===
As of match played 3 April 2026

Appearances and goals by club, season and competition
Club	Season	League			National cup (Note: Includes Iraq FA Cup)		Continental		Total	
Club	Season	Division	Apps	Goals	Apps	Goals	Apps	Goals	Apps	Goals
Al-Talaba	2023–24	Iraq Stars League	?	1	?	?	-	-	?	1
Al-Talaba	2024–25	Iraq Stars League	27	0	2	0	-	-	29	0
Al-Talaba	2025–26	Iraq Stars League	21	4	0	0	-	-	21	4
Career total			48	5	2	0	-	-	50	5

=== International ===
As of 3 April 2026

Appearances and goals by national team and year
National team	Year	Apps	Goals
Iraq	2025	3	0
Iraq	2026	1	0
Total		4	0

== Honours ==
Iraq U23

- AFC U-23 Asian Cup third place: 2024
