= Dragan Talajić =

Croatian footballer and manager (born 1965)

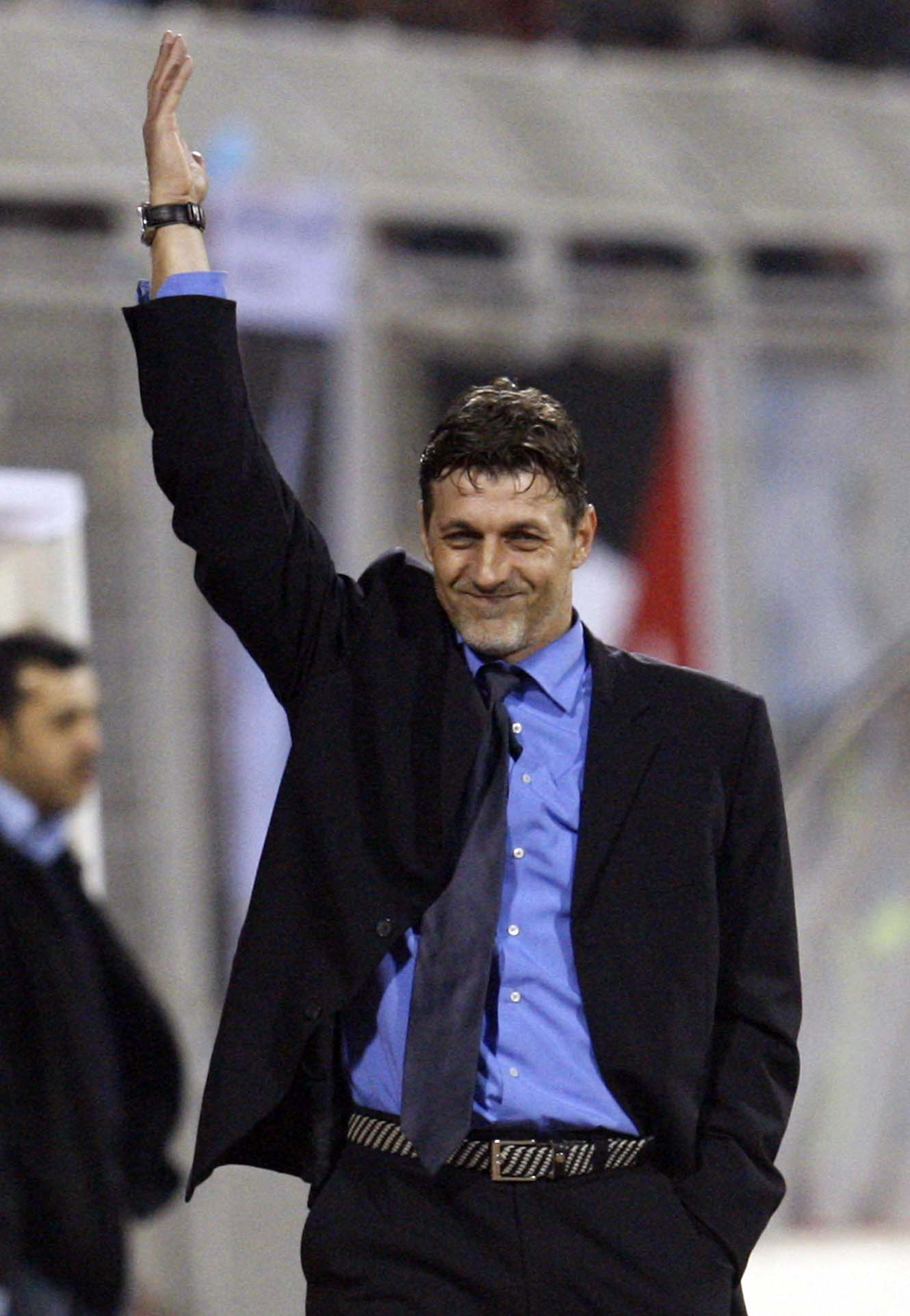
- Talajić in 2011

Personal information
- Date of birth: 25 August 1965 (age 61)
- Place of birth: Sarajevo, SFR Yugoslavia
- Height: 1.88 m (6 ft 2 in)
- Position: Goalkeeper

Team information
- Current team: Bahrain (head coach)

Senior career*
Years	Team	Apps	(Gls)
1984-1987	FK Sarajevo	24	
1988-1992	Istra	16	
1992–1993	Izola	13	(1)
1993–1996	Zeytinburnuspor	26	(0)
1996–1997	Orijent	32	(0)
1997–2001	Tanjong Pagar United	67	(0)

Managerial career
- 2003–2004: Al Ittihad (assistant)
- 2004: Al Ittihad
- 2005–2006: Riffa
- 2006–2007: East Riffa
- 2007–2009: Al Nahda
- 2009–2010: Shabab Al Ordon
- 2010–2011: Al-Wehdat
- 2011–2012: Kuwait SC
- 2012: Ittihad Kalba
- 2013–2014: Dhofar
- 2014–2016: Muangthong United
- 2017: Al-Faisaly
- 2017–2018: Henan Jianye
- 2020: Al Tai
- 2021–2022: Al Khaldiya
- 2022–2023: Bahrain (Technical Director)
- 2024–: Bahrain
Medal record
Men's football
Representing Bahrain (as manager)
Arabian Gulf Cup
Winner	2024 Kuwait
- * Club domestic league appearances and goals

Dragan Talajić (born 25 August 1965) is a Bosnianformer footballer who is the head coach of Bahrain national football team. Talajić played as a goalkeeper and is a football manager who has managed many clubs in the Middle East, Thailand, and China.

He is the winning coach of the 2004 AFC Champions League with Al-Ittihad. For the 2010–11 season Talajić was declared Best Coach of Asia and Best Coach of Arabic football world by Al Jazeera Sport TV, Best Coach of Arabic football world by MBC Sport TV and Best Coach of Jordan by votes of fans and press. In Croatia Football Federation-HNS, Talajić is regarded as the prodigy of one of the most successful Bosnian managers in history, Tomislav Ivić.

== Club career ==
Talajić had a spell with Zeytinburnuspor in the Turkish Süper Lig during the 1994–95 season. Dragan started in FK Sarajevo and was one of the brightest young talents of Yugoslav football. As a junior player for FK Sarajevo, Dragan Talajić broke the record of the great Yugoslav goalkeeper Slobodan Janjuš by having received only one goal in the whole season. During the 1992–93 season Talajić was a part of a historic Slovenian football story having played a UEFA Cup match against Benfica for Slovenian side Belvedur Izola. His performance in UEFA Cup, despite having conceded 8 goals in the UEFA competition, led to a transfer to Turkish Süper Lig. He played in Turkey for two seasons. After a short spell with NK Orijent in Croatia's Prva HNL, from 1997 to the end of his career Talajić played for Tanjong Pagar United FC in Singapore's S-League. Talajić left a big mark in Singaporean football since he was twice selected as the player of the year.

== Career as manager ==
=== Al Ittihad ===
Talajić won the 2004 AFC Champions League as manager of Saudi club Al-Ittihad. He won 0–5 in Korea which is the biggest win in Asian Champions League final in the history of Asian football. It was Al Ittihad first Asian Champions League trophy in their history. It is till this day the biggest score in any AFC Champions League final, making Dragan Talajic the only coach in Asian history to win a final with five goals. He left the club within 6 months.

=== Riffa Club & Al-Nahda ===
He led Al Riffa from Bahrain to the finals stage of the Gulf Cup in 2005–2006. Talajić led Saudi club Al Nahda to the final of the Prince Faisal Cup 2007/2008 entering in the history of Saudi football as the first team from the second league to play the finals of Prince Faisal Cup.

=== Shabab Al-Ordon ===
In the 2009–10 season, Talajić was the coach of Shabab Al-Ordon (Jordan Youth Club) from Amman, Jordan. He led his team to a victory in AFC Cup in Yemen against Al-Ahli Sana'a', drew both home and away against Al-Karmah from Syria, then drew in Oman against Saham and won against Saham in Jordan and qualified to the next round of the AFC Cup, thanks to a win in Jordan against Al-Ahli Sana'a by 6–1.

=== Al-Wahdat ===
For the season 2010–2011, Talajić is the head coach of the biggest Jordanian side Al-Wahdat from Amman. His remarkable trophy run began on 6 August 2010 when Talajić won his first trophy of the season with Al-Wahdat winning 2–0 in the finals of the Jordan Shield Cup.

On 13 August 2010, Talajić won the Jordan Super Cup against Al-Wahdat's bitter rival Al-Faisaly. The title win was 10th Super Cup trophy that Al-Wahdat has won in the club's history.

At the end of the season, 2010-2011 Talajic's Al-Wahdat finished first winning the Jordan League with 17 point difference between them and Al-Faisaly who finished second. Talajić's Al-Wahdat finished end of the season with 16 wins, 3 draws and 1 loss. Including their fixtures in the AFC Cup, where they are through to the quarter-finals, they have won 32 of their 39 games, drawn six and lost just one. In the process, they have racked up 82 goals and conceded just 23. Talajić made a remarkable run with 46 games without defeat.

On 21 May, Talajić won the Jordan League Cup as his fourth trophy of the season becoming the first coach in history to win all 4 trophies in one season.

=== Kuwait SC ===
In July 2011, Talajić signed a one-year contract with Kuwait SC club from Kuwait. Talajić was brought to Kuwait SC after his remarkable run with Al Wahdat in the season 2010–2011. Talajić led his club to victory at home against Muangthong United winning by 1–0. In Thailand the score was 0-0 and Kuwait SC qualified to the semi-finals of the AFC Cup. Talajić was dismissed in the 65' minute in Thailand after entering the pitch to protest to the referee for his disgraceful performance after the Thai players injured 4 Kuwaiti players without receiving any cards for their dirty way of playing. Talajić was later suspended by the Asian Football Federation for one game due to his actions. In the semi-finals of AFC Cup Talajić's Kuwait SC played against Iraqi's Arbil FC. Kuwait won in Iraq with the result 2-0 and played in Kuwait 3–3 to qualify to the AFC Cup Finals. Their opponent in the finals was FC Nasaf Qarshi from Uzbekistan. The finals were played at Qarshi Stadium located in Qarshi, Uzbekistan. FC Nasaf Qarshi had to their advantage the home stadium and fans which led to a hell of an atmosphere for Talajić's team. The game ended with 2-1 for FC Nasaf Qarshi. On 18 December, Dragan Talajić won the Kuwait Federation Cup beating in the finals Kazma with the result 4–3, in the 50th minute the score was 0–3 in favor of Kazma SC, but Talajić brought in two substitutes and changed the course of the game making the Kuwait Federation Cup finals 2011 more than spectacular. On 8 March 12, Dragan parted ways with the club.

=== Ittihad Kalba ===
He was the coach of Ittihad Kalba for a very short period of time. During his time with Ittihad Kalba he had to face many big defeats from the giants of UAE Arabian Gulf League. He managed the club for 6 matches, with bad results and Talajic just couldn't find the same language and vision with the club boss, Dragan Talajic left the club with a mutual agreement with the club.

=== Dhofar ===
In June 2013, the Omani club Dhofar appointed him as their coach. Dragan was in charge of Omani giant Dhofar who won Oman Professional League record 9 times. He continued the tradition of Dhofar being the biggest club in Sultanate of Oman.

=== Muangthong United ===
On 2 July 2014, Muangthong United have announced that they have signed Talajić as their head coach on a 3-year contract. On 30 July Talajić led Muangthong United to a 1–1 draw against La Liga side UD Almeria of Spain. Talajić led the club to the 2nd place in Thai Premier League, 2nd place in Thai FA Cup and the qualification for the Asian Champions League 2016. On 19 January 2016 the agreement was reached between Coach Dragan and the board to end the contract with the club. Dragan Talajic left the club with 60% wins on a period of two seasons.

=== Al Faisaly ===
On 19 September 2017, Talajić took helm of the most successful Jordanian football club, 2 times AFC Cup Champion, 19 times Jordan FA Cup Champion, 16 times Jordan Super Cup Champion, 7 times Jordan FA Shield Champion and 33 times Jordan League Champion Al-Faisaly.

=== Henan Jianye ===
On 18 December 2017, Talajić was appointed as the head coach of Henan Jianye of the Chinese Super League. On 11 March 2018, Talajić led Henan Jianye to a 1–0 victory against a favored side of coach Uli Stielike, Tianjin Teda, which is a jubilee 300th victory of Henan Jianye in Chinese Super League history. On 21 April 2018 after seven matches. Dragan Talajic parted company with Henan due to the club not being able to follow his attacking philosophy. He was a part of the coaching elite of Chinese Super League 2018 among coaches as: Fabio Capello, Bernd Schuster, Manuel Pellegrini, Paulo Sousa, Dragan Stojkovic, Vitor Pereira and Fabio Cannavaro.

=== Al-Khaldiya ===
On 10 December 2021, Talajić was appointed as the head coach of Al-Khaldiya of the Bahraini Premier League. Al Khaldiya is a football club established in Bahrain by the Bahrain Royal Family in 2020. It is the newest Bahrain club but the most ambitious and financially the strongest Bahrain football team. With huge ambitions of the football club, Talajić was appointed as the head coach and more than nine Bahrain National Team players were brought to the club. Talajić started on the best way, beating Al Muharraq the 35 times Bahrain Football Champion and two times AFC Asian Cup Champions in Bahrain Federation Cup. On 10 February 2022, Talajić took Al Khaldiya's side to the King of Bahrain Cup 2022 Final for the first time in the club's history. On 5 March 2022, he achieved the Bahraini King's Cup for the first time ever, by winning against East Riffa on penalties.

=== Bahrain national team ===
In 2022, Talajić was appointed as the Bahraini national team technical director. In February 2024, he became the head coach of the national team, and secured his first title in the 26th Arabian Gulf Cup. Talajić, however, also led Bahrain to have their worst-ever final round performance at the 2026 FIFA World Cup qualification, with the team consigned at the bottom place of the table for the first time in the history, in part due to shock defeats to China and Indonesia, despite a memorable shock 1–0 away win over Australia at the first matchday of the round.

== Managerial statistics ==
As of match played 30 September 2026

Team	Nat	From	To	Record							
Team	Nat	From	To	G	W	D	L	GF	GA	GD	Win %
Al Ittihad	(Saudi Arabia)	12 December 2004	1 February 2005	4	4	0	0	11	2	+9	100.00
Bahrain Riffa	(Bahrain)	9 August 2005	1 June 2006	27	17	7	3	53	21	+32	62.96
East Riffa	(Bahrain)	13 July 2006	11 June 2007	34	14	11	9	48	47	+1	41.18
Al Nahda	(Saudi Arabia)	4 August 2007	19 May 2009	58	29	11	18	76	51	+25	50.00
Shabab Al Ordon	(Jordan)	1 September 2009	1 June 2010	29	17	8	4	48	27	+21	58.62
Al-Wehdat	(Jordan)	6 August 2010	21 May 2011	46	37	8	1	96	23	+73	80.43
Kuwait SC	(Kuwait)	5 July 2011	8 March 2012	27	14	9	4	39	26	+13	51.85
Ittihad Kalba	(United Arab Emirates)	17 September 2012	29 October 2012	8	1	2	5	7	12	−5	12.50
Dhofar	(Oman)	17 June 2013	27 May 2014	36	18	9	9	48	23	+25	50.00
Muangthong United	(Thailand)	2 July 2014	19 January 2016	61	36	12	13	123	62	+61	59.02
Al-Faisaly	(Jordan)	19 September 2017	10 December 2017	12	6	3	3	19	14	+5	50.00
Henan Jianye	(China)	18 December 2017	20 April 2018	7	1	1	5	3	13	−10	14.29
Al Khaldiya	(Bahrain)	12 December 2020	1 June 2022	16	12	3	1	20	9	+11	75.00
Bahrain	(Bahrain)	20 February 2024	Present	31	8	6	17	33	52	−19	25.81
Career totals				384	213	88	83	625	369	+256	55.47

^{1} A win or loss by the penalty shoot-out is counted as the draw in time.

== Honours ==
=== Manager ===
Al-Ittihad

- AFC Champions League Elite: 2004

Al-Riffa SC

- GCC Champions League runner-up: 2005–06

Al-Nahda

- Prince Faisal bin Fahd Cup: 2007–08

Al-Wehdat SC

- Jordan FA Shield: 2010
- Jordan Super Cup: 2011
- Jordan League: 2010–11
- Jordan FA Cup: 2010–11

Kuwait SC

- Kuwait Federation Cup: 2011–12
- AFC Champions League Two runner-up: 2011

Muangthong United

- Thai Premier League runner-up: 2015
- Thai FA Cup runner-up: 2015

Al Khaldiya

- Bahraini King's Cup: 2023

Bahrain

- Arabian Gulf Cup: 2024–25

Individual

- Best Coach of Asia 2010–11 (Al Jazeera Sport TV)
- Best Coach of Arabic football world 2010–11 (Al Jazeera Sport TV & MBC Sport TV)
- Best Coach of Jordan 2010–11 (Votes of people and Press)
- Best Manager of the Month 2015 Thai League T1
