= 2023 AFC Asian Cup Group E =

Group E of the 2023 AFC Asian Cup took place from 15 to 25 January 2024. The group consisted of South Korea, Malaysia, Jordan and Bahrain. The top two teams, Bahrain and South Korea, along with third-placed Jordan (as one of the four best third-placed teams), advanced to the round of 16.

== Teams ==
Draw position	Team	Zone	Method of qualification	Date of qualification	Finals appearance	Last appearance	Previous best performance	FIFA Rankings	
Draw position	Team	Zone	Method of qualification	Date of qualification	Finals appearance	Last appearance	Previous best performance	April 2023 (Note: The rankings of April 2023 were used for seeding for the final draw.)	December 2023
E1	South Korea	EAFF	Second round Group H winners	9 June 2021	15th	2019	Winners (1956, 1960)	27	23
E2	Malaysia	AFF	Third round Group E runners-up	14 June 2022	4th	2007	Group stage (1976, 1980, 2007)	138	130
E3	Jordan	WAFF	Third round Group A winners	14 June 2022	5th	2019	Quarter-finals (2004, 2011)	84	87
E4	Bahrain	WAFF	Third round Group E winners	14 June 2022	7th	2019	Fourth place (2004)	85	86

== Standings ==
Pos	Team	Pld	W	D	L	GF	GA	GD	Pts	Qualification
1	Bahrain	3	2	0	1	3	3	0	6	Advance to knockout stage
2	South Korea	3	1	2	0	8	6	+2	5	Advance to knockout stage
3	Jordan	3	1	1	1	6	3	+3	4	Advance to knockout stage
4	Malaysia	3	0	1	2	3	8	−5	1	

Source: AFC
Rules for classification: Group stage tiebreakers

== Matches ==
=== South Korea vs Bahrain ===
This was the fourth time South Korea faced Bahrain in a competitive AFC Asian Cup fixture. Their most recent encounter happened in 2019, where South Korea claimed a hard-fought 2–1 win; all three previous Asian Cup encounters ended by the same scoreline, with Bahrain claiming one win—in 2007—while South Korea won two others, in 2011 and 2019.

The match started with great difficulties for the South Koreans due to Bahrain's aggressive efforts, which saw South Korea receive three yellow cards. However, South Korea managed to regroup and re-applied pressure against Bahrain. In the 38th minute, following a foul from Ali Madan, Park Yong-woo quickly provided a long-range pass to Lee Jae-sung before he gave a low pass toward Hwang In-beom, who then struck Bahrain's net despite frantic efforts by Bahraini defenders. In the second half, Bahrain surprisingly gave a quick response in the 51st minute; a brilliant high pass from Madan gave the ball to Mohamed Marhoon, whose shot got deflected by Jung Seung-hyun to Abdullah Al-Hashash, as he didn't miss the opportunity to equalise. Five minutes later, attempt to clear the ball from defender Mohamed Adel resulted in the ball instead given to Kim Min-jae, who then sent the ball to Lee Kang-in before Lee himself delivered a thunderous shot to restore South Korea's lead. Lee then finished the game in the 68th minute when Mohamed Al-Hardan mishandled the ball to Son Heung-min, who then passed to Hwang In-beom before Hwang sent it to Lee Kang-in, who then gave a clinical finish to the bottom right corner of Ebrahim Lutfalla.

This was the first time South Korea managed to defeat Bahrain with more than one-goal margin, with all three previous meetings all ended with one-goal difference.

15 January 2024
14:30

South Korea	3–1	Bahrain
Hwang In-beom 38'; Lee Kang-in 56', 68'	Report	Al-Hashash 51'

Jassim bin Hamad Stadium, Al Rayyan
Attendance: 8,388
Referee: Ma Ning (China)

South Korea	Bahrain

GK	1	Kim Seung-gyu
RB	22	Seol Young-woo
CB	15	Jung Seung-hyun
CB	4	Kim Min-jae	(yellow card) 13'	(substituted off) 72'
LB	2	Lee Ki-je	(yellow card) 28'	(substituted off) 52'
CM	5	Park Yong-woo	(yellow card) 9'	(substituted off) 82'
CM	6	Hwang In-beom
RW	18	Lee Kang-in
AM	7	Son Heung-min (c)	(yellow card) 90+4'
LW	10	Lee Jae-sung		(substituted off) 82'
CF	9	Cho Gue-sung	(yellow card) 61'	(substituted off) 72'
Substitutions:
DF	23	Kim Tae-hwan		(substituted on) 52'
DF	19	Kim Young-gwon		(substituted on) 72'
MF	8	Hong Hyun-seok		(substituted on) 72'
MF	16	Park Jin-seop		(substituted on) 82'
MF	17	Jeong Woo-yeong		(substituted on) 82'
Manager:
(Germany) Jürgen Klinsmann

GK	22	Ebrahim Lutfalla
RB	18	Mohamed Adel		(substituted off) 72'
CB	2	Amine Benaddi		(substituted off) 46'
CB	3	Waleed Al Hayam (c)
LB	19	Hazza Ali
CM	6	Mohamed Al-Hardan
CM	13	Moses Atede	(yellow card) 45'	(substituted off) 65'
RF	7	Ali Madan	(yellow card) 31'	(substituted off) 82'
AM	10	Kamil Al-Aswad
LW	8	Mohamed Marhoon
CF	14	Abdullah Al-Hashash		(substituted off) 66'
Substitutions:
DF	4	Sayed Baqer		(substituted on) 46'
MF	24	Jasim Khelaif		(substituted on) 65'
FW	9	Abdulla Yusuf Helal		(substituted on) 66'
MF	20	Mahdi Al-Humaidan		(substituted on) 72'
MF	25	Ibrahim Al-Wali		(substituted on) 82'
Manager:
(Spain) Juan Antonio Pizzi

Man of the Match:
Lee Kang-in (South Korea)

Assistant referees:
Zhou Fei (China)
Zhang Cheng (China)
Fourth official:
Yusuke Araki (Japan)
Reserve assistant referee:
Takumi Takagi (Japan)
Video assistant referee:
Fu Ming (China)
Assistant video assistant referees:
Hanna Hattab (Syria)

=== Malaysia vs Jordan ===
This was the first time Malaysia faced Jordan in the AFC Asian Cup finals. Their latest competitive meeting was at the 1988 AFC Asian Cup qualification, where Malaysia and Jordan were held to a goalless draw. Jordan have been undefeated to Malaysia nor even conceded a goal.

The match was quickly dominated by Jordan over an inexperienced Malaysian side and they soon overpowered Malaysia when Yazan Al-Naimat produced a backheel for Mahmoud Al-Mardi, who then curved the ball into Malaysia's net in the 12th minute. Six minutes later, things became even better for Jordan when Malaysia's captain Matthew Davies committed a foul on Al-Naimat in the penalty area before Musa Al-Taamari converted it to double Jordan's lead. In the 32th minute, it was Al-Taamari who again capitalised from his team's counterattack in Malaysia's left bank to pass to Al-Naimat, who then overcame Syihan Hazmi before sending it for Al-Mardi to secure his poker. Despite Malaysia's improvement in the second half, Malaysia ended up not just failing to score, but even in a failed offensive, Musa Al-Taamari added to his credential from a long pass before flicking over Hazmi to secure Jordan's big win.

Jordan once again defeated Malaysia effortedly to remain undefeated and did not concede a goal.

15 January 2024
20:30

Malaysia	0–4	Jordan
	Report	Al-Mardi 12', 32'; Al-Taamari 18' (pen.), 85'

Al Janoub Stadium, Al Wakrah
Attendance: 20,410
Referee: Mohammed Abdulla Hassan Mohamed (United Arab Emirates)

Malaysia	Jordan

GK	16	Syihan Hazmi
CB	2	Matthew Davies (c)
CB	15	Junior Eldstål
CB	21	Dion Cools
RM	12	Arif Aiman Hanapi	(substituted off) 63'
CM	20	Afiq Fazail	(substituted off) 80'
CM	8	Stuart Wilkin
LM	22	La'Vere Corbin-Ong
RF	7	Faisal Halim	(substituted off) 80'
CF	9	Darren Lok	(substituted off) 46'
LF	26	Romel Morales	(substituted off) 63'
Substitutions:
DF	3	Shahrul Saad	(substituted on) 46'
MF	17	Paulo Josué	(substituted on) 63'
FW	19	Akhyar Rashid	(substituted on) 63'
FW	13	Mohamadou Sumareh	(substituted on) 80'
FW	11	Safawi Rasid	(substituted on) 80'
Manager:
(South Korea) Kim Pan-gon

GK	1	Yazid Abu Layla
CB	3	Abdallah Nasib
CB	5	Yazan Al-Arab
CB	17	Salem Al-Ajalin
RM	23	Ihsan Haddad (c)		(substituted off) 67'
CM	21	Nizar Al-Rashdan	(yellow card) 45+1'	(substituted off) 67'
CM	8	Noor Al-Rawabdeh
LM	13	Mahmoud Al-Mardi		(substituted off) 35'
RF	10	Musa Al-Taamari		(substituted off) 89'
CF	11	Yazan Al-Naimat		(substituted off) 67'
LF	9	Ali Olwan
Substitutions:
DF	2	Mohammad Abu Hashish		(substituted on) 35'
MF	14	Rajaei Ayed		(substituted on) 67'
DF	16	Feras Shelbaieh		(substituted on) 67'
MF	25	Anas Al-Awadat		(substituted on) 67'
FW	20	Hamza Al-Dardour		(substituted on) 89'
Manager:
(Morocco) Hussein Ammouta

Man of the Match:
Mahmoud Al-Mardi (Jordan)

Assistant referees:
Mohamed Al-Hammadi (United Arab Emirates)
Hasan Al-Mahri (United Arab Emirates)
Fourth official:
Mohammed Al-Hoish (Saudi Arabia)
Reserve assistant referee:
Khalaf Al-Shammari (Saudi Arabia)
Video assistant referee:
Omar Al-Ali (United Arab Emirates)
Assistant video assistant referees:
Adel Al-Naqbi (United Arab Emirates)

=== Jordan vs South Korea ===
This was the second Asian Cup finals encounter between Jordan and South Korea; their only Asian Cup meeting was in 2004 where Jordan shocked South Korea with a goalless draw. The last time the two met each other in any competitive fixtures occurred during the 2010 FIFA World Cup qualification, which South Korea gained a first-ever win over Jordan 1–0 away; despite this, South Korea remained undefeated to Jordan with three wins and two draws.

South Korea quickly applied pressure and an unnecessary foul from Ihsan Haddad to Son Heung-min at the fifth minute resulted in a penalty after a lengthy VAR consultation; Son didn't miss the opportunity to convert it to goal. However, this goal ended up triggering the Jordanian fightback and it was Jordan, not South Korea, that applied pressure. In one such attempt at the 37th minute, a corner kick by the Jordanians resulted in Park Yong-woo (who was being pressured by Yazan Al-Arab) scoring an own goal to equalise the match. To make it better for Jordan, before the end of the first half, at the sixth minute of extra time, Musa Al-Taamari produced a solo; despite his shot was being prevented by Jung Seung-hyun, it deflected wide enough for Yazan Al-Naimat to take the volley and give Jordan a shock lead. At the second half, Jordan's organised defence proved to be highly effective as South Korea could not find the back of the net, but when the match came to extra time, Son Heung-min managed to sneak into Jordanian penalty area, providing a pass to Hwang In-beom, whose shot later hit the foot of Al-Arab before deflecting to Yazid Abu Layla's net, confirming the result to a thrilling draw.

This result meant South Korea remained undefeated to Jordan after six meetings, yet South Korea had not defeated Jordan in both Asian Cup meetings, while Jordan missed out another opportunity to produce a shock result after their neighbour Iraq shocked Japan a day earlier.

20 January 2024
14:30

Jordan	2–2	South Korea
Park Yong-woo 37' (o.g.); Al-Naimat 45+6'	Report	Son Heung-min 9' (pen.); Al-Arab 90+1' (o.g.)

Al Thumama Stadium, Doha
Attendance: 36,627
Referee: Salman Falahi (Qatar)

Jordan	South Korea

GK	1	Yazid Abu Layla
CB	3	Abdallah Nasib
CB	5	Yazan Al-Arab	(yellow card) 29'
CB	17	Salem Al-Ajalin
RM	23	Ihsan Haddad (c)	(yellow card) 8'
CM	21	Nizar Al-Rashdan		(substituted off) 84'
CM	14	Rajaei Ayed		(substituted off) 74'
LM	13	Mahmoud Al-Mardi		(substituted off) 74'
RF	10	Musa Al-Taamari	(yellow card) 18'
CF	11	Yazan Al-Naimat		(substituted off) 84'
LF	9	Ali Olwan
Substitutions:
DF	2	Mohammad Abu Hashish		(substituted on) 74'
MF	26	Fadi Awad		(substituted on) 74'
MF	15	Ibrahim Sadeh		(substituted on) 84'
MF	25	Anas Al-Awadat		(substituted on) 84'
Manager:
(Morocco) Hussein Ammouta

GK	21	Jo Hyeon-woo
RB	22	Seol Young-woo
CB	15	Jung Seung-hyun
CB	4	Kim Min-jae
LB	2	Lee Ki-je		(substituted off) 46'
RM	18	Lee Kang-in
CM	5	Park Yong-woo		(substituted off) 46'
CM	6	Hwang In-beom	(yellow card) 28'	(substituted off) 90+4'
LM	10	Lee Jae-sung		(substituted off) 69'
CF	7	Son Heung-min (c)
CF	9	Cho Gue-sung		(substituted off) 69'
Substitutions:
MF	8	Hong Hyun-seok		(substituted on) 46'
DF	23	Kim Tae-hwan		(substituted on) 46'
FW	20	Oh Hyeon-gyu	(yellow card) 90+5'	(substituted on) 69'
MF	17	Jeong Woo-yeong		(substituted on) 69'
MF	16	Park Jin-seop		(substituted on) 90+4'
Manager:
(Germany) Jürgen Klinsmann

Man of the Match:
Son Heung-min (South Korea)

Assistant referees:
Taleb Al-Marri (Qatar)
Saoud Al-Maqaleh (Qatar)
Fourth official:
Adel Al-Naqbi (United Arab Emirates)
Reserve assistant referee:
Mohamed Al-Hammadi (United Arab Emirates)
Video assistant referee:
Abdulla Al-Marri (Qatar)
Assistant video assistant referees:
Abdulrahman Al-Jassim (Qatar)

=== Bahrain vs Malaysia ===
Bahrain and Malaysia met each other shortly after their recent meeting during the 2023 AFC Asian Cup qualification. Malaysia won just two in 12 previous meetings, but Bahrain dominated in all competitive fixtures with an undefeated record, including the most recent 2–1 win in the same Asian Cup qualification.

The match was largely a dull affair as neither Bahrain or Malaysia proved to be the better side for most of the game, until the fifth minute of the second half's extra time, when from a corner kick, the ball was deflected to Ali Madan, who then unleashed his long-range shot at the surprise of the Malaysians as Syihan Hazmi failed to clear out despite having his hand slightly touching the ball, resulting in the only goal of the match at death.

With this result, Malaysia failed to advance past the group stage of an AFC Asian Cup again after four appearances, while they were also struggling to find their first Asian Cup win since 1980 (2–0 against the United Arab Emirates).

20 January 2024
17:30

Bahrain	1–0	Malaysia
Madan 90+5'	Report

Jassim bin Hamad Stadium, Al Rayyan
Attendance: 10,386
Referee: Ahmed Al-Kaf (Oman)

Bahrain	Malaysia

GK	22	Ebrahim Lutfalla
RB	18	Mohamed Adel
CB	4	Sayed Baqer
CB	3	Waleed Al Hayam (c)
LB	19	Hazza Ali		(substituted off) 79'
CM	6	Mohamed Al-Hardan
CM	13	Moses Atede		(substituted off) 55'
RW	7	Ali Madan
AM	10	Kamil Al-Aswad	(yellow card) 45+1'	(substituted off) 71'
LW	8	Mohamed Marhoon		(substituted off) 70'
CF	14	Abdullah Al-Hashash		(substituted off) 55'
Substitutions:
MF	15	Jasim Al-Shaikh		(substituted on) 55'
FW	9	Abdulla Yusuf Helal		(substituted on) 55'
FW	20	Mahdi Al-Humaidan		(substituted on) 70'
MF	12	Ali Hassan Isa		(substituted on) 71'
DF	23	Abdullah Al-Khalasi		(substituted on) 79'
Manager:
(Spain) Juan Antonio Pizzi

GK	16	Syihan Hazmi
CB	6	Dominic Tan
CB	3	Shahrul Saad	(yellow card) 52'
CB	21	Dion Cools
RM	2	Matthew Davies (c)
CM	8	Stuart Wilkin
CM	14	Syamer Kutty Abba	(yellow card) 19'	(substituted off) 46'
LM	22	La'Vere Corbin-Ong
RF	12	Arif Aiman Hanapi		(substituted off) 75'
CF	17	Paulo Josué		(substituted off) 75'
LF	7	Faisal Halim		(substituted off) 84'
Substitutions:
MF	24	Natxo Insa		(substituted on) 46'
FW	19	Akhyar Rashid		(substituted on) 75'
FW	26	Romel Morales		(substituted on) 75'
FW	13	Mohamadou Sumareh		(substituted on) 84'
Manager:
(South Korea) Kim Pan-gon

Man of the Match:
Ali Madan (Bahrain)

Assistant referees:
Abu Bakar Al-Amri (Oman)
Rashid Al-Ghaithi (Oman)
Fourth official:
Mohanad Qasim Sarray (Iraq)
Reserve assistant referee:
Ahmed Al-Baghdadi (Iraq)
Video assistant referee:
Omar Al-Ali (United Arab Emirates)
Assistant video assistant referees:
Shaun Evans (Australia)

=== South Korea vs Malaysia ===
South Korea faced Malaysia for the first time since their last meeting during the 1990 FIFA World Cup qualification in June 1989, which South Korea won 3–0. In term of Asian Cup finals encounter however, Malaysia held South Korea to a 1–1 draw back in 1980.

South Korea got off to a dream start when Jeong Woo-yeong came out better in a corner, whose header saw the ball cross the line despite Syihan Hazmi's effort to give South Korea the lead at the 21st minute after VAR intervened. However, Malaysia put up a shock fightback at the early part of the second half; first, a clumsy defending by Hwang In-beom saw the ball intercepted by Darren Lok, who gave the ball to Arif Aiman Hanapi and then Faisal Halim. The latter tied both Kim Min-jae and Jo Hyeon-woo in knots before slotting it home. Seol Young-woo then fouled Arif in the 58th minute, a situation that VAR again intervened for four minutes before Arif converted to give Malaysia the lead. In the 83rd minute however, Lee Kang-in pounced on the ball brilliantly from a set-piece, which hit Syihan before deflecting into Malaysia's net. Drama came in the first minute of added time when Oh Hyeon-gyu, latching onto Hwang Hee-chan's horizontal delivery, was fouled by Junior Eldstål, which resulted in a VAR-assisted penalty that Son Heung-min converted. But as the Koreans were about to top the table, Malaysia left the last mark when from another mistake by the South Korean defence, Paulo Josué made a clinical pass for Romel Morales, allowing the Colombian to seal the deal with a low shot into the bottom right corner well out of Jo's reach and end the match in a manic draw.

Despite not winning a single match and were firmly eliminated before this encounter, the 3–3 draw meant Malaysia got their first point in the AFC Asian Cup since 1980, the last time they qualified not as a host country. For South Korea, they once again failed to win against Malaysia at the AFC Asian Cup (drawn two), and because of Bahrain's 1–0 win over Jordan, South Korea failed to top the group table for the first time since 2011.

25 January 2024
14:30

South Korea	3–3	Malaysia
Jeong Woo-yeong 21'; Lee Kang-in 83'; Son Heung-min 90+4' (pen.)	Report	Faisal 51'; Arif 62' (pen.); Morales 90+15'

Al Janoub Stadium, Al Wakrah
Attendance: 30,117
Referee: Khalid Al-Turais (Saudi Arabia)

South Korea	Malaysia

GK	21	Jo Hyeon-woo
RB	23	Kim Tae-hwan
CB	4	Kim Min-jae
CB	19	Kim Young-gwon
LB	22	Seol Young-woo		(substituted off) 75'
CM	10	Lee Jae-sung	(yellow card) 19'	(substituted off) 90+11'
CM	6	Hwang In-beom		(substituted off) 62'
RW	18	Lee Kang-in
AM	7	Son Heung-min (c)
LW	17	Jeong Woo-yeong		(substituted off) 75'
CF	9	Cho Gue-sung		(substituted off) 62'
Substitutions:
FW	11	Hwang Hee-chan		(substituted on) 62'
MF	8	Hong Hyun-seok		(substituted on) 62'
DF	3	Kim Jin-su		(substituted on) 75'
FW	20	Oh Hyeon-gyu		(substituted on) 75'
MF	5	Park Yong-woo		(substituted on) 90+11'
Manager:
(Germany) Jürgen Klinsmann

GK	16	Syihan Hazmi
CB	3	Shahrul Saad
CB	21	Dion Cools (c)
CB	6	Dominic Tan	(substituted off) 84'
RM	4	Daniel Ting
CM	18	Brendan Gan	(substituted off) 90+11'
CM	8	Stuart Wilkin
LM	22	La'Vere Corbin-Ong
RF	12	Arif Aiman Hanapi	(substituted off) 84'
CF	9	Darren Lok	(substituted off) 73'
LF	7	Faisal Halim	(substituted off) 84'
Substitutions:
FW	17	Paulo Josué	(substituted on) 73'
MF	14	Syamer Kutty Abba	(substituted on) 84'
DF	15	Junior Eldstål	(substituted on) 84'
FW	19	Akhyar Rashid	(substituted on) 84'
FW	26	Romel Morales	(substituted on) 90+11'
Manager:
(South Korea) Kim Pan-gon

Man of the Match:
Son Heung-min (South Korea)

Assistant referees:
Zaid Al-Shammari (Saudi Arabia)
Yasir Al-Sultan (Saudi Arabia)
Fourth official:
Abdulrahman Al-Jassim (Qatar)
Reserve assistant referee:
Watheq Al-Swaiedi (Iraq)
Video assistant referee:
Abdulla Al-Marri (Qatar)
Assistant video assistant referees:
Mohammed Al Hoish (Saudi Arabia)

=== Jordan vs Bahrain ===
This was the two's first competitive encounter since the 1998 FIFA World Cup qualification, where both teams gained a win each. The two teams' most recent meeting was in a friendly in 2021, where Jordan won 2–1. This was also the first Asian Cup meetings between the two.

In a match where Bahrain needed to secure at least a point against already qualified Jordan, the Jordanians were the ones to make stronger start. However, as Jordan were trying to find the goal, they were punished from a counterattack at the 34th minute from a brilliant defending effort by the Bahrainis, which saw Ali Madan provide a clinical gift for Abdulla Yusuf Helal, who then sprinted into the net of Yazid Abu Layla before scoring at the bottom left corner. The goal turned out to be the only goal of the match, as both teams' rather dull performances meant Bahrain secured the win.

With this result, combined with South Korea's dropping two points to a shock draw to Malaysia at the same time, it was the first time ever in Bahrain's Asian Cup history that they managed to win two group stage matches and topped the group stage table.

25 January 2024
14:30

Jordan	0–1	Bahrain
	Report	Helal 34'

Khalifa International Stadium, Al Rayyan
Attendance: 39,650
Referee: Omar Al-Ali (United Arab Emirates)

Jordan	Bahrain

GK	1	Yazid Abu Layla
CB	3	Abdallah Nasib
CB	19	Anas Bani Yaseen (c)
CB	17	Salem Al-Ajalin	(yellow card) 56'	(substituted off) 85'
RM	16	Feras Shelbaieh
CM	14	Rajaei Ayed		(substituted off) 74'
CM	26	Fadi Awad
LM	2	Mohammad Abu Hashish
RF	24	Yousef Abu Jalboush		(substituted off) 85'
CF	11	Yazan Al-Naimat		(substituted off) 74'
LF	9	Ali Olwan	(yellow card) 67'	(substituted off) 74'
Substitutions:
MF	15	Ibrahim Sadeh		(substituted on) 74'
MF	25	Anas Al-Awadat		(substituted on) 74'
FW	20	Hamza Al-Dardour		(substituted on) 74'
DF	4	Bara' Marei		(substituted on) 85'
MF	18	Saleh Rateb		(substituted on) 85'
Manager:
(Morocco) Hussein Ammouta

GK	22	Ebrahim Lutfalla
RB	18	Mohamed Adel	(substituted off) 81'
CB	4	Sayed Baqer
CB	3	Waleed Al Hayam (c)
LB	23	Abdullah Al-Khalasi
DM	6	Mohamed Al-Hardan	(substituted off) 81'
CM	10	Kamil Al-Aswad	(substituted off) 63'
CM	15	Jasim Al-Shaikh
RF	7	Ali Madan	(substituted off) 62'
CF	9	Abdulla Yusuf Helal
LF	8	Mohamed Marhoon	(substituted off) 71'
Substitutions:
MF	16	Mohammed Abdul Qayoom	(substituted on) 62'
FW	20	Mahdi Al-Humaidan	(substituted on) 63'
MF	11	Ebrahim Al-Khattal	(substituted on) 71'
MF	25	Ibrahim Al-Wali	(substituted on) 81'
DF	26	Hussain Al-Eker	(substituted on) 81'
Manager:
(Spain) Juan Antonio Pizzi

Man of the Match:
Abdulla Yusuf Helal (Bahrain)

Assistant referees:
Mohamed Al-Hammadi (United Arab Emirates)
Hasan Al-Mahri (United Arab Emirates)
Fourth official:
Ma Ning (China)
Reserve assistant referee:
Zhou Fei (China)
Video assistant referee:
Mohammed Abdulla Hassan Mohamed (United Arab Emirates)
Assistant video assistant referees:
Adel Al-Naqbi (United Arab Emirates)

== Discipline ==
Fair play points would have been used as tiebreakers if the overall and head-to-head records of teams were tied. These were calculated based on yellow and red cards received in all group matches as follows:

- first yellow card: −1 point;
- indirect red card (second yellow card): −3 points;
- direct red card: −3 points;
- yellow card and direct red card: −4 points;

Only one of the above deductions was applied to a player in a single match.

Team	Match 1				Match 2				Match 3				Points
Team	Booked	(yellow card) (yellow-red card)	Sent off (straight red)	(yellow card) (red card)	Booked	(yellow card) (yellow-red card)	Sent off (straight red)	(yellow card) (red card)	Booked	(yellow card) (yellow-red card)	Sent off (straight red)	(yellow card) (red card)	Points
South Korea	5				2				1				–8
Malaysia					2								–2
Jordan	1				3				2				–6
Bahrain	2				1								–3
