= Abdullah Al-Hashash =

Bahraini professional footballer

Personal information
- Date of birth: January 25, 1996 (age 30)
- Place of birth: Riffa, Bahrain
- Height: 1.92 m (6 ft 3 1/2 in)
- Position: Forward

Team information
- Current team: Al-Ahli Club

Senior career*
Years	Team	Apps	(Gls)
2019–2020	Busaiteen Club		
2020–2022	Al-Hidd		
2021–2022	→Budaiya (loan)		
2022–	Al-Ahli Club		

International career^{‡}
2022–	Bahrain	10	(2)
- * Club domestic league appearances and goals as of 06:15, 10 January 2024 (UTC) ‡ National team caps and goals as of 23:00, 15 January 2024 (UTC)

Abdullah Al-Hashash (Arabic: عبدالله الحشاش; born 25 January 1996) is a Bahraini professional footballer who plays as a forward for Al-Ahli Club, and the Bahrain national team.

== Club career ==
Al-Hashash began his senior career with Busaiteen Club in the Bahraini Premier League in 2019. He then moved to defending champion Al-Hidd on 2 November 2020. On 25 June 2021, he moved to Budaiya on loan, where he became top scorer. In 2022, he moved to Al-Ahli Club on 19 May 2022.

== International career ==
Al-Hashash debuted for the Bahrain national team in a 3–1 friendly win over Uganda on 27 January 2022. He was called up to the national team for the 2023 AFC Asian Cup. On 15 January 2024, he scored his side's opening goal in the tournament in a 3–1 loss to South Korea.

=== International goals ===
List of international goals scored by Abdullah Al-Hashash
No.	Date	Venue	Opponent	Score	Result	Competition
1	27 January 2022	Bahrain National Stadium, Riffa, Bahrain	Uganda	3–1	3–1	Friendly
2	15 January 2024	Jassim bin Hamad Stadium, Al Rayyan, Qatar	South Korea	1–1	1–3	2023 AFC Asian Cup
