= 2023 AFC Asian Cup =

18th edition of the AFC Asian Cup

AFC Asian Cup Qatar 2023 كأس آسيا 2023

Tournament details
- Host country: Qatar
- Dates: 12 January – 10 February 2024
- Teams: 24 (from 1 confederation)
- Venues: 9 (in 5 host cities)

Final positions
- Champions: Qatar (2nd title)
- Runners-up: Jordan

Tournament statistics
- Matches played: 51
- Goals scored: 132 (2.59 per match)
- Attendance: 1,507,790 (29,565 per match)
- Top scorer: (Qatar) Akram Afif (8 goals)
- Best player: (Qatar) Akram Afif
- Best goalkeeper: (Qatar) Meshaal Barsham
- Fair play award: Qatar

The 2023 AFC Asian Cup was the 18th edition of the AFC Asian Cup, the quadrennial international football tournament organised by the Asian Football Confederation (AFC). It involved 24 national teams after its expansion in 2019, with hosts Qatar the defending champions.

On 17 October 2022, the AFC announced that the tournament would be held in Qatar, replacing the original hosts China. Due to the high summer temperatures and Qatar's participation in the 2023 CONCACAF Gold Cup, the tournament was postponed to 12 January – 10 February 2024, while retaining the original name for both existing sponsorship and logistical purposes. The 2023 tournament were the second of three consecutive Asian Cup to be held in Middle East, following the 2019 AFC Asian Cup in United Arab Emirates and preceding the 2027 AFC Asian Cup in Saudi Arabia. This marked the first time a country hosted the AFC Asian Cup having hosted the FIFA World Cup before. Due to the one-year postponement, Qatar 2023 was the only tournament to not have been held in an odd-numbered year since the 2007 edition.

Hosts and defending champions Qatar retained their title after defeating Jordan 3–1 in the final.

== Host selection ==
China was acclaimed as the host country on 4 June 2019, as sole finishing bidder, days just prior to the 69th FIFA Congress in Paris, France. The tournament was originally scheduled to be held from 16 June to 16 July 2023. On 14 May 2022, the AFC announced that China would not host the tournament due to the COVID-19 pandemic and China's Zero-COVID policy. Due to China's relinquishment of its hosting rights, the AFC conducted a second round of bidding, with a deadline for submissions scheduled on 17 October 2022. Four nations submitted bids: Australia, Indonesia, Qatar, and South Korea. However, Australia subsequently withdrew in September 2022, as did Indonesia on 15 October. On 17 October, the AFC announced that Qatar had won the bid and would host the tournament.

== Venues ==
Locations of stadiums in the Doha metropolitan area and surrounding regions.

Five host cities were submitted in the 2023 bid, including seven stadiums previously prepared for the 2022 FIFA World Cup. On 5 April 2023, the AFC announced the eight stadiums across four host cities for the tournament. On 21 August 2023, Lusail Stadium was added as a ninth venue. All but one (Stadium 974) of the host stadiums from the 2022 FIFA World Cup were selected for the tournament, along with Jassim bin Hamad Stadium, which hosted matches during the 2011 edition, and Abdullah bin Khalifa Stadium, which had not hosted any international tournament previously.

Lusail Stadium hosted the opening match on 12 January. Ahmad bin Ali Stadium in Al Rayyan and Al Thumama Stadium in Doha hosted the semi-final matches, with Lusail hosted the final held on 10 February.

On 5 January 2024, the Main Media Centre for the coverage of the tournament was officially inaugurated in Msheireb Downtown Doha.

List of host cities and stadiums
City	Stadium	Capacity	Image
Al Khor	Al Bayt Stadium	68,895	
Lusail	Lusail Stadium	88,966	
Al Rayyan	Ahmad bin Ali Stadium	45,032	
Al Rayyan	Education City Stadium	44,667	
Al Rayyan	Jassim bin Hamad Stadium	13,030	
Al Rayyan	Khalifa International Stadium	45,857	
Doha	Abdullah bin Khalifa Stadium	10,221	
Doha	Al Thumama Stadium	44,400	
Al Wakrah	Al Janoub Stadium	44,325	

== Teams ==
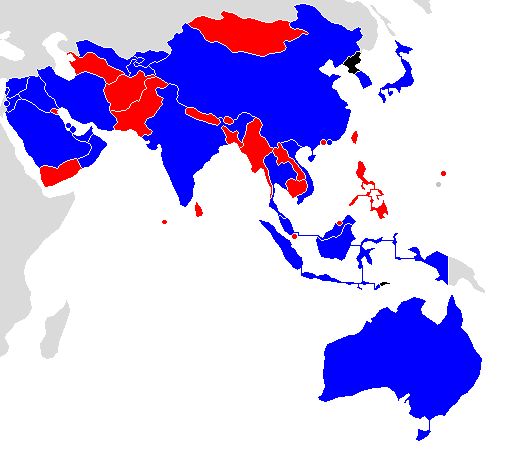
Teams qualified Teams failed to qualify Withdrew or excluded Not an AFC member

The first two rounds of qualification also served as the Asian qualification for the 2022 World Cup. Qatar, the host of the World Cup, participated only in the second round to qualify for the 2023 Asian Cup (which they were later selected as hosts for after China withdrew its hosting rights).

=== Qualified teams ===
Of the 24 teams appearing, 20 teams were returning after appearing in the 2019 edition.

Tajikistan were the only debutant in the competition, while Hong Kong marked their return for the first time in 56 years. Indonesia and Malaysia both qualified for the first time since hosting the 2007 AFC Asian Cup.

Four nations from the previous edition failed to qualify (North Korea, the Philippines, Turkmenistan, and Yemen). India was the only SAFF representative in this edition, while it was the first time that five teams from the AFF managed to reach the finals (Australia, Indonesia, Malaysia, Thailand, and Vietnam). Only two teams from WAFF failed to qualify for this tournament (Yemen and Kuwait). Iran meanwhile extended their qualification record; this was their fifteenth straight appearance in the tournament, having qualified for every edition since 1968.

As of 2026, this was the last time that Hong Kong, India and Malaysia qualified for the Asian Cup, and the last time that Kuwait, North Korea and Singapore failed to qualify.

Team	Method of qualification	Date of qualification	Finals appearance	Last appearance	Previous best performance
China	Original hosts and second round Group A runners-up	4 June 2019 (Note: China was awarded hosting rights on 4 June 2019. They later finished as second round Group A runners-up on 15 June 2021, which would earn them a qualification regardless of the hosting status. China later withdrew their hosting rights on 14 May 2022.)	13th	2019	Runners-up (1984, 2004)
Japan	Second round Group F winners	28 May 2021	10th	2019	Winners (1992, 2000, 2004, 2011)
Syria	Second round Group A winners	7 June 2021	7th	2019	Group stage (1980, 1984, 1988, 1996, 2011, 2019)
Qatar	Second round Group E winners, later appointed hosts	7 June 2021	11th	2019	Winners (2019)
South Korea	Second round Group H winners	9 June 2021	15th	2019	Winners (1956, 1960)
Australia	Second round Group B winners	11 June 2021	5th	2019	Winners (2015)
Iran	Second round Group C winners	15 June 2021	15th	2019	Winners (1968, 1972, 1976)
Saudi Arabia	Second round Group D winners	15 June 2021	11th	2019	Winners (1984, 1988, 1996)
United Arab Emirates	Second round Group G winners	15 June 2021	11th	2019	Runners-up (1996)
Iraq	Second round Group C runners-up	15 June 2021	10th	2019	Winners (2007)
Oman	Second round Group E runners-up	15 June 2021	5th	2019	Round of 16 (2019)
Vietnam	Second round Group G runners-up	15 June 2021	5th	2019	Fourth place (1956, 1960) (Note: Both as South Vietnam)
Lebanon	Second round Group H runners-up	15 June 2021	3rd	2019	Group stage (2000, 2019)
Palestine	Third round Group B winners	14 June 2022	3rd	2019	Group stage (2015, 2019)
Uzbekistan	Third round Group C winners	14 June 2022	8th	2019	Fourth place (2011)
Thailand	Third round Group C runners-up	14 June 2022	8th	2019	Third place (1972)
India	Third round Group D winners	14 June 2022	5th	2019	Runners-up (1964)
Hong Kong	Third round Group D runners-up	14 June 2022	4th	1968	Third place (1956)
Tajikistan	Third round Group F winners	14 June 2022	1st	Debut	None
Kyrgyzstan	Third round Group F runners-up	14 June 2022	2nd	2019	Round of 16 (2019)
Bahrain	Third round Group E winners	14 June 2022	7th	2019	Fourth place (2004)
Malaysia	Third round Group E runners-up	14 June 2022	4th	2007	Group stage (1976, 1980, 2007)
Jordan	Third round Group A winners	14 June 2022	5th	2019	Quarter-finals (2004, 2011)
Indonesia	Third round Group A runners-up	14 June 2022	5th	2007	Group stage (1996, 2000, 2004, 2007)

=== Draw ===
The draw was held at the Katara Opera House in Doha on 11 May 2023.

From the April 2023 FIFA World Rankings
Pot 1	Pot 2	Pot 3	Pot 4
Qatar (61) (hosts); Japan (20); Iran (24); South Korea (27); Australia (29); Saudi Arabia (54)	Iraq (67); United Arab Emirates (72); Oman (73); Uzbekistan (74); China (81); Jordan (84)	Bahrain (85); Syria (90); Palestine (93); Vietnam (95); Kyrgyzstan (96); Lebanon (99)	India (101); Tajikistan (109); Thailand (114); Malaysia (138); Hong Kong (147); Indonesia (149)

==== Draw result ====
Teams were drawn into Groups A to F. For the first time in AFC Asian Cup history, the teams from lowest pots were drawn first but not assigned to the positions of their groups, following by number orders of the group stage, as in previous editions. Pot 1 teams were assigned to the first positions of their groups, while next the positions of all other teams were drawn separately from Pot 4 to 2 (for the purposes of determining the match schedules in each group).

The groups were confirmed following the draw:

Group A
Pos	Team
A1	Qatar
A2	China
A3	Tajikistan
A4	Lebanon

Group B
Pos	Team
B1	Australia
B2	Uzbekistan
B3	Syria
B4	India

Group C
Pos	Team
C1	Iran
C2	United Arab Emirates
C3	Hong Kong
C4	Palestine

Group D
Pos	Team
D1	Japan
D2	Indonesia
D3	Iraq
D4	Vietnam

Group E
Pos	Team
E1	South Korea
E2	Malaysia
E3	Jordan
E4	Bahrain

Group F
Pos	Team
F1	Saudi Arabia
F2	Thailand
F3	Kyrgyzstan
F4	Oman

== Squads ==
Each team was required to registered a squad with a minimum of 18 players and a maximum of 23 players, at least three of whom had to be goalkeepers. In December 2023, the maximum was increased to 26 players.

== Officiating ==
On 14 September 2023, the AFC announced the list of 33 referees, 37 assistant referees, two stand-by referees and eight stand-by assistant referees for the tournament, including two female referees and three female assistant referees. (This included Yoshimi Yamashita, who became the first woman to referee at any AFC Asian Cup.) Video Assistant Referee (VAR) was used for the entire tournament following its implementation from the quarter-final stage onwards in the 2019 edition. The Semi-Automated Offside Technology (SAOT) system, which utilized twelve specialized cameras and artificial intelligence, was also implemented at all 51 matches. This marked the first time that SAOT was in place at an AFC competition and made the AFC the first confederation to apply the system at the continental men's national team level.

Referees

- (Australia) Shaun Evans
- (Australia) (Iran) Alireza Faghani
- (Australia) Kate Jacewicz
- (China) Fu Ming
- (China) Ma Ning
- (Iran) Mooud Bonyadifard
- (Iraq) Mohanad Qasim Sarray
- (Japan) Yusuke Araki
- (Japan) Jumpei Iida
- (Japan) Hiroyuki Kimura
- (Japan) Yoshimi Yamashita
- (Jordan) Adham Makhadmeh
- (Kuwait) Ahmad Al-Ali
- (Kuwait) Abdullah Jamali
- (Malaysia) Nazmi Nasaruddin
- (Oman) Ahmed Al-Kaf
- (Qatar) Abdulrahman Al-Jassim
- (Qatar) Abdulla Al-Marri
- (Qatar) Khamis Al-Marri
- (Qatar) Salman Falahi
- (Saudi Arabia) Mohammed Al-Hoaish
- (Saudi Arabia) Khalid Al-Turais
- (Singapore) Muhammad Taqi
- (South Korea) Kim Hee-gon
- (South Korea) Kim Jong-hyeok
- (South Korea) Ko Hyung-jin
- (Syria) Hanna Hattab
- (Tajikistan) Sadullo Gulmurodi
- (Thailand) Sivakorn Pu-udom
- (United Arab Emirates) Omar Al-Ali
- (United Arab Emirates) Adel Al-Naqbi
- (United Arab Emirates) Mohammed Abdulla Hassan Mohamed
- (Uzbekistan) Akhrol Riskullaev
- (Uzbekistan) Ilgiz Tantashev

Assistant referees

- (Australia) Ashley Beecham
- (Australia) Anton Shchetinin
- (China) Zhang Cheng
- (China) Zhou Fei
- (Iran) Alireza Ildorom
- (Iran) Saeid Ghasemi
- (Iraq) Ahmed Al-Baghdadi
- (Iraq) Watheq Al-Swaiedi
- (Japan) Makoto Bozono
- (Japan) Jun Mihara
- (Japan) Takumi Takagi
- (Japan) Naomi Teshirogi
- (Jordan) Mohammad Al-Kalaf
- (Jordan) Ahmad Al-Roalle
- (Kuwait) Ahmad Abbas
- (Kuwait) Abdulhadi Al-Anezi
- (Malaysia) Mohd Arif Shamil Bin Abd Rasid
- (Malaysia) Mohamad Zairul Bin Khalil Tan
- (Oman) Abu Bakar Al-Amri
- (Oman) Rashid Al-Ghaithi
- (Qatar) Saoud Al-Maqaleh
- (Qatar) Taleb Al-Marri
- (Saudi Arabia) Zaid Al-Shammari
- (Saudi Arabia) Yasir Al-Sultan
- (Singapore) Abdul Hannan Bin Abdul Hasim
- (Singapore) Ronnie Koh Min Kiat
- (South Korea) Kim Kyoung-min
- (South Korea) Park Sang-jun
- (South Korea) Yoon Jae-yeol
- (Syria) Ali Ahmad
- (Syria) Mohamad Kazzaz
- (Thailand) Tanate Chuchuen
- (Thailand) Rawut Nakarit
- (United Arab Emirates) Mohamed Al-Hammadi
- (United Arab Emirates) Hasan Al-Mahri
- (Uzbekistan) Timur Gaynullin
- (Uzbekistan) Andrey Tsapenko

Stand-by referees

- (Japan) Toru Kamikawa
- (Saudi Arabia) Majed Al-Shamrani

Stand-by assistant referees

- (China) Cao Yi
- (Hong Kong) Cheung Yim Yau
- (Jordan) Ismail Al-Hafi
- (Kuwait) Saad Al-Fadhli
- (Qatar) Abdulrahman Hussein
- (Saudi Arabia) Mohammed Al-Abakry
- (Singapore) John Chia Eng Wah
- (Uzbekistan) Farkhad Abdullaev

== Opening ceremony ==
The opening ceremony, named "The Lost Chapter of Kelileh o Demneh" took place at Lusail Stadium, before the opening game between Qatar and Lebanon on 12 January 2024.

== Group stage ==
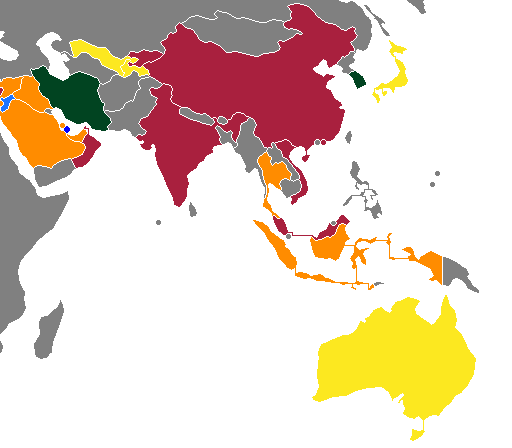
Result of teams participating in the 2023 AFC Asian Cup: Champion Runner-up / Losing semi-finalists Quarter-finals / Round of 16 Group stage

=== Tiebreakers ===
Teams were ranked according to points (3 points for a win, 1 point for a draw, 0 points for a loss), and if tied on points, the following tiebreaking criteria were applied, in the order given, to determine the rankings:

1. Points in head-to-head matches among tied teams;
2. Goal difference in head-to-head matches among tied teams;
3. Goals scored in head-to-head matches among tied teams;
4. If more than two teams were tied, and after applying all head-to-head criteria above, a subset of teams were still tied, all head-to-head criteria above were reapplied exclusively to this subset of teams;
5. Goal difference in all group matches;
6. Goals scored in all group matches;
7. Penalty shoot-out if only two teams were tied and they played each other in the last round of the group;
8. Disciplinary points (yellow card = 1 point, red card as a result of two yellow cards = 3 points, direct red card = 3 points, yellow card followed by direct red card = 4 points);
9. Drawing of lots.

=== Group A ===
Pos	Team	Pld	W	D	L	GF	GA	GD	Pts	Qualification
1	Qatar (H)	3	3	0	0	5	0	+5	9	Advance to knockout stage
2	Tajikistan	3	1	1	1	2	2	0	4	Advance to knockout stage
3	China	3	0	2	1	0	1	−1	2	
4	Lebanon	3	0	1	2	1	5	−4	1	

Source: AFC
(H) Hosts
12 January 2024
19:00

Qatar	3–0	Lebanon
Afif 45', 90+6'; Ali 56'	Report

Lusail Stadium, Lusail
Attendance: 82,490
Referee: Alireza Faghani (Iran)
13 January 2024
17:30

China	0–0	Tajikistan
	Report

Abdullah bin Khalifa Stadium, Doha
Attendance: 4,001
Referee: Mohammed Al-Hoaish (Saudi Arabia)

17 January 2024
14:30

Lebanon	0–0	China
	Report

Al Thumama Stadium, Doha
Attendance: 14,137
Referee: Ko Hyung-jin (South Korea)
17 January 2024
17:30

Tajikistan	0–1	Qatar
	Report	Afif 17'

Al Bayt Stadium, Al Khor
Attendance: 57,460
Referee: Hiroyuki Kimura (Japan)

22 January 2024
18:00

Qatar	1–0	China
Al-Haydos 66'	Report

Khalifa International Stadium, Al Rayyan
Attendance: 42,104
Referee: Abdullah Jamali (Kuwait)
22 January 2024
18:00

Tajikistan	2–1	Lebanon
Umarbayev 80'; Khamrokulov 90+2'	Report	Jradi 47'

Jassim bin Hamad Stadium, Al Rayyan
Attendance: 11,843
Referee: Mohanad Qasim Sarray (Iraq)

=== Group B ===
Pos	Team	Pld	W	D	L	GF	GA	GD	Pts	Qualification
1	Australia	3	2	1	0	4	1	+3	7	Advance to knockout stage
2	Uzbekistan	3	1	2	0	4	1	+3	5	Advance to knockout stage
3	Syria	3	1	1	1	1	1	0	4	Advance to knockout stage
4	India	3	0	0	3	0	6	−6	0	

Source: AFC
13 January 2024
14:30

Australia	2–0	India
Irvine 50'; Bos 73'	Report

Ahmad bin Ali Stadium, Al Rayyan
Attendance: 36,253
Referee: Yoshimi Yamashita (Japan)
13 January 2024
20:30

Uzbekistan	0–0	Syria
	Report

Jassim bin Hamad Stadium, Al Rayyan
Attendance: 10,198
Referee: Ahmed Al-Kaf (Oman)

18 January 2024
14:30

Syria	0–1	Australia
	Report	Irvine 59'

Jassim bin Hamad Stadium, Al Rayyan
Attendance: 10,097
Referee: Adel Al-Naqbi (United Arab Emirates)
18 January 2024
17:30

India	0–3	Uzbekistan
	Report	Fayzullaev 4'; Sergeev 18'; Nasrullaev 45+4'

Ahmad bin Ali Stadium, Al Rayyan
Attendance: 38,491
Referee: Fu Ming (China)

23 January 2024
14:30

Australia	1–1	Uzbekistan
Boyle 45+1' (pen.)	Report	Turgunboev 78'

Al Janoub Stadium, Al Wakrah
Attendance: 15,290
Referee: Yusuke Araki (Japan)
23 January 2024
14:30

Syria	1–0	India
Khribin 76'	Report

Al Bayt Stadium, Al Khor
Attendance: 42,787
Referee: Sivakorn Pu-udom (Thailand)

=== Group C ===
Pos	Team	Pld	W	D	L	GF	GA	GD	Pts	Qualification
1	Iran	3	3	0	0	7	2	+5	9	Advance to knockout stage
2	United Arab Emirates	3	1	1	1	5	4	+1	4	Advance to knockout stage
3	Palestine	3	1	1	1	5	5	0	4	Advance to knockout stage
4	Hong Kong	3	0	0	3	1	7	−6	0	

Source: AFC
14 January 2024
17:30

United Arab Emirates	3–1	Hong Kong
Adil 34' (pen.); Sultan 52'; Al-Ghassani 90+5' (pen.)	Report	Chan Siu Kwan 49'

Khalifa International Stadium, Al Rayyan
Attendance: 15,586
Referee: Muhammad Taqi (Singapore)
14 January 2024
20:30

Iran	4–1	Palestine
Ansarifard 2'; Khalilzadeh 12'; Ghayedi 38'; Azmoun 55'	Report	Seyam 45+6'

Education City Stadium, Al Rayyan
Attendance: 27,691
Referee: Abdulrahman Al-Jassim (Qatar)

18 January 2024
20:30

Palestine	1–1	United Arab Emirates
Nasser 50' (o.g.)	Report	Adil 23'

Al Janoub Stadium, Al Wakrah
Attendance: 41,986
Referee: Ahmad Al-Ali (Kuwait)
19 January 2024
20:30

Hong Kong	0–1	Iran
	Report	Ghayedi 24'

Khalifa International Stadium, Al Rayyan
Attendance: 36,412
Referee: Hanna Hattab (Syria)

23 January 2024
18:00

Iran	2–1	United Arab Emirates
Taremi 26', 65'	Report	Al-Ghassani 90+3'

Education City Stadium, Al Rayyan
Attendance: 34,259
Referee: Ilgiz Tantashev (Uzbekistan)
23 January 2024
18:00

Hong Kong	0–3	Palestine
	Report	Dabbagh 12', 60'; Z. Qunbar 48'

Abdullah bin Khalifa Stadium, Doha
Attendance: 6,568
Referee: Shaun Evans (Australia)

=== Group D ===
Pos	Team	Pld	W	D	L	GF	GA	GD	Pts	Qualification
1	Iraq	3	3	0	0	8	4	+4	9	Advance to knockout stage
2	Japan	3	2	0	1	8	5	+3	6	Advance to knockout stage
3	Indonesia	3	1	0	2	3	6	−3	3	Advance to knockout stage
4	Vietnam	3	0	0	3	4	8	−4	0	

Source: AFC
14 January 2024
14:30

Japan	4–2	Vietnam
Minamino 11', 45'; Nakamura 45+4'; Ueda 85'	Report	Nguyễn Đình Bắc 16'; Phạm Tuấn Hải 33'

Al Thumama Stadium, Doha
Attendance: 17,385
Referee: Kim Jong-hyeok (South Korea)
15 January 2024
17:30

Indonesia	1–3	Iraq
Marselino 37'	Report	M. Ali 17'; Rashid 45+7'; Hussein 75'

Ahmad bin Ali Stadium, Al Rayyan
Attendance: 16,532
Referee: Ilgiz Tantashev (Uzbekistan)

19 January 2024
14:30

Iraq	2–1	Japan
Hussein 5', 45+4'	Report	Endo 90+3'

Education City Stadium, Al Rayyan
Attendance: 38,663
Referee: Khalid Al-Turais (Saudi Arabia)
19 January 2024
17:30

Vietnam	0–1	Indonesia
	Report	Asnawi 42' (pen.)

Abdullah bin Khalifa Stadium, Doha
Attendance: 7,253
Referee: Sadullo Gulmurodi (Tajikistan)

24 January 2024
14:30

Japan	3–1	Indonesia
Ueda 6' (pen.), 52'; Hubner 88' (o.g.)	Report	Walsh 90+1'

Al Thumama Stadium, Doha
Attendance: 26,453
Referee: Khamis Al-Marri (Qatar)
24 January 2024
14:30

Iraq	3–2	Vietnam
Sulaka 47'; Hussein 73', 90+12' (pen.)	Report	Bùi Hoàng Việt Anh 42'; Nguyễn Quang Hải 90+1'

Jassim bin Hamad Stadium, Al Rayyan
Attendance: 8,932
Referee: Nazmi Nasaruddin (Malaysia)

=== Group E ===
Pos	Team	Pld	W	D	L	GF	GA	GD	Pts	Qualification
1	Bahrain	3	2	0	1	3	3	0	6	Advance to knockout stage
2	South Korea	3	1	2	0	8	6	+2	5	Advance to knockout stage
3	Jordan	3	1	1	1	6	3	+3	4	Advance to knockout stage
4	Malaysia	3	0	1	2	3	8	−5	1	

Source: AFC
15 January 2024
14:30

South Korea	3–1	Bahrain
Hwang In-beom 38'; Lee Kang-in 56', 68'	Report	Al-Hashash 51'

Jassim bin Hamad Stadium, Al Rayyan
Attendance: 8,388
Referee: Ma Ning (China)
15 January 2024
20:30

Malaysia	0–4	Jordan
	Report	Al-Mardi 12', 32'; Al-Taamari 18' (pen.), 85'

Al Janoub Stadium, Al Wakrah
Attendance: 20,410
Referee: Mohammed Abdulla Hassan Mohamed (United Arab Emirates)

20 January 2024
14:30

Jordan	2–2	South Korea
Park Yong-woo 37' (o.g.); Al-Naimat 45+6'	Report	Son Heung-min 9' (pen.); Al-Arab 90+1' (o.g.)

Al Thumama Stadium, Doha
Attendance: 36,627
Referee: Salman Falahi (Qatar)
20 January 2024
17:30

Bahrain	1–0	Malaysia
Madan 90+5'	Report

Jassim bin Hamad Stadium, Al Rayyan
Attendance: 10,386
Referee: Ahmed Al-Kaf (Oman)

25 January 2024
14:30

South Korea	3–3	Malaysia
Jeong Woo-yeong 21'; Lee Kang-in 83'; Son Heung-min 90+4' (pen.)	Report	Faisal 51'; Arif 62' (pen.); Morales 90+15'

Al Janoub Stadium, Al Wakrah
Attendance: 30,117
Referee: Khalid Al-Turais (Saudi Arabia)
25 January 2024
14:30

Jordan	0–1	Bahrain
	Report	Helal 34'

Khalifa International Stadium, Al Rayyan
Attendance: 39,650
Referee: Omar Al-Ali (United Arab Emirates)

=== Group F ===
Pos	Team	Pld	W	D	L	GF	GA	GD	Pts	Qualification
1	Saudi Arabia	3	2	1	0	4	1	+3	7	Advance to knockout stage
2	Thailand	3	1	2	0	2	0	+2	5	Advance to knockout stage
3	Oman	3	0	2	1	2	3	−1	2	
4	Kyrgyzstan	3	0	1	2	1	5	−4	1	

Source: AFC
16 January 2024
17:30

Thailand	2–0	Kyrgyzstan
Supachai 26', 48'	Report

Abdullah bin Khalifa Stadium, Doha
Attendance: 4,530
Referee: Adham Makhadmeh (Jordan)
16 January 2024
20:30

Saudi Arabia	2–1	Oman
Ghareeb 78'; Al-Bulaihi 90+6'	Report	Al-Yahyaei 14' (pen.)

Khalifa International Stadium, Al Rayyan
Attendance: 41,987
Referee: Shaun Evans (Australia)

21 January 2024
17:30

Oman	0–0	Thailand
	Report

Abdullah bin Khalifa Stadium, Doha
Attendance: 6,340
Referee: Mooud Bonyadifard (Iran)
21 January 2024
20:30

Kyrgyzstan	0–2	Saudi Arabia
	Report	Kanno 35'; Al-Ghamdi 84'

Ahmad bin Ali Stadium, Al Rayyan
Attendance: 39,557
Referee: Jumpei Iida (Japan)

25 January 2024
18:00

Saudi Arabia	0–0	Thailand
	Report

Education City Stadium, Al Rayyan
Attendance: 38,773
Referee: Kim Hee-gon (South Korea)
25 January 2024
18:00

Kyrgyzstan	1–1	Oman
Kojo 80'	Report	Al-Ghassani 8'

Abdullah bin Khalifa Stadium, Doha
Attendance: 6,231
Referee: Ahmad Al-Ali (Kuwait)

=== Ranking of third-placed teams ===
The four best third-placed teams from the six groups advanced to the knockout stage along with the six group winners and six runners-up.

Pos	Grp	Team	Pld	W	D	L	GF	GA	GD	Pts	Qualification
1	E	Jordan	3	1	1	1	6	3	+3	4	Advance to knockout stage
2	C	Palestine	3	1	1	1	5	5	0	4	Advance to knockout stage
3	B	Syria	3	1	1	1	1	1	0	4	Advance to knockout stage
4	D	Indonesia	3	1	0	2	3	6	−3	3	Advance to knockout stage
5	F	Oman	3	0	2	1	2	3	−1	2	
6	A	China	3	0	2	1	0	1	−1	2	

Source: AFC
Rules for classification: 1) Points; 2) Goal difference; 3) Goals scored; 4) Disciplinary points; 5) Drawing of lots.

== Knockout stage ==
In the knockout stage, extra time and a penalty shoot-out were used to decide the winner if necessary.

=== Bracket ===
Round of 16
28 January – Al Rayyan (ABAS)
Tajikistan (p)	1 (5)
United Arab Emirates	1 (3)
29 January – Al Rayyan (KIS)
Iraq	2
Jordan	3
28 January – Al Rayyan (JBHS)
Australia	4
Indonesia	0
30 January – Al Rayyan (ECS)
Saudi Arabia	1 (2)
South Korea (p)	1 (4)
31 January – Doha (ABKS)
Iran (p)	1 (5)
Syria	1 (3)
31 January – Doha (ATS)
Bahrain	1
Japan	3
29 January – Al Khor
Qatar	2
Palestine	1
30 January – Al Wakrah
Uzbekistan	2
Thailand	1

Quarter-finals
2 February – Al Rayyan (ABAS)
Tajikistan	0
Jordan	1
2 February – Al Wakrah
Australia	1
South Korea (a.e.t.)	2
3 February – Al Rayyan (ECS)
Iran	2
Japan	1
3 February – Al Khor
Qatar (p)	1 (3)
Uzbekistan	1 (2)

Semi-finals
6 February – Al Rayyan (ABAS)
Jordan	2
South Korea	0
7 February – Doha (ATS)
Iran	2
Qatar	3

Final
10 February – Lusail
Jordan	1
Qatar	3

All times are local, AST (UTC+3).

=== Round of 16 ===
28 January 2024
14:30

Australia	4–0	Indonesia
Baggott 12' (o.g.); Boyle 45'; Goodwin 89'; Souttar 90+1'	Report

Jassim bin Hamad Stadium, Al Rayyan
Attendance: 7,863
Referee: Mohammed Abdulla Hassan Mohamed (United Arab Emirates)

28 January 2024
19:00

Tajikistan	1–1 (a.e.t.)	United Arab Emirates
Hanonov 30'	Report	Al Hammadi 90+5'
Penalties
Nazarov (penalty scored); Hanonov (penalty scored); Panjshanbe (penalty scored); Soirov (penalty scored); Shukurov (penalty scored)	5–3	(penalty scored) Idrees; (penalty missed) Caio; (penalty scored) Lima; (penalty scored) Saleh

Ahmad bin Ali Stadium, Al Rayyan
Attendance: 33,584
Referee: Yusuke Araki (Japan)

29 January 2024
14:30

Iraq	2–3	Jordan
Natiq 68'; Hussein 76'	Report	Al-Naimat 45+1'; Al-Arab 90+5'; Al-Rashdan 90+7'

Khalifa International Stadium, Al Rayyan
Attendance: 35,814
Referee: Alireza Faghani (Australia)

29 January 2024
19:00

Qatar	2–1	Palestine
Al-Haydos 45+6'; Afif 49' (pen.)	Report	Dabbagh 37'

Al Bayt Stadium, Al Khor
Attendance: 63,753
Referee: Ma Ning (China)

30 January 2024
14:30

Uzbekistan	2–1	Thailand
Turgunboev 37'; Fayzullaev 65'	Report	Supachok 58'

Al Janoub Stadium, Al Wakrah
Attendance: 18,691
Referee: Nazmi Nasaruddin (Malaysia)

30 January 2024
19:00

Saudi Arabia	1–1 (a.e.t.)	South Korea
Radif 46'	Report	Cho Gue-sung 90+9'
Penalties
Kanno (penalty scored); Abdulhamid (penalty scored); Al-Najei (penalty missed); Ghareeb (penalty missed)	2–4	(penalty scored) Son Heung-min; (penalty scored) Kim Young-gwon; (penalty scored) Cho Gue-sung; (penalty scored) Hwang Hee-chan

Education City Stadium, Al Rayyan
Attendance: 42,389
Referee: Ilgiz Tantashev (Uzbekistan)

31 January 2024
14:30

Bahrain	1–3	Japan
Ueda 64' (o.g.)	Report	Dōan 31'; Kubo 49'; Ueda 72'

Al Thumama Stadium, Doha
Attendance: 31,832
Referee: Ahmad Al-Ali (Kuwait)

31 January 2024
19:00

Iran	1–1 (a.e.t.)	Syria
Taremi 34' (pen.)	Report	Khribin 64' (pen.)
Penalties
Ansarifard (penalty scored); Rezaeian (penalty scored); Ebrahimi (penalty scored); Torabi (penalty scored); Hajsafi (penalty scored)	5–3	(penalty scored) Sabbag; (penalty missed) Youssef; (penalty scored) Ousou; (penalty scored) Al Dali

Abdullah bin Khalifa Stadium, Doha
Attendance: 8,720
Referee: Kim Jong-hyeok (South Korea)

=== Quarter-finals ===
2 February 2024
14:30

Tajikistan	0–1	Jordan
	Report	Hanonov 66' (o.g.)

Ahmad bin Ali Stadium, Al Rayyan
Attendance: 35,530
Referee: Fu Ming (China)

2 February 2024
18:30

Australia	1–2 (a.e.t.)	South Korea
Goodwin 42'	Report	Hwang Hee-chan 90+6' (pen.); Son Heung-min 104'

Al Janoub Stadium, Al Wakrah
Attendance: 39,632
Referee: Ahmed Al-Kaf (Oman)

3 February 2024
14:30

Iran	2–1	Japan
Mohebi 55'; Jahanbakhsh 90+6' (pen.)	Report	Morita 28'

Education City Stadium, Al Rayyan
Attendance: 35,640
Referee: Ma Ning (China)

3 February 2024
18:30

Qatar	1–1 (a.e.t.)	Uzbekistan
Al-Haydos 27'	Report	Hamrobekov 59'
Penalties
Afif (penalty scored); Ali (penalty missed); Mukhtar (penalty missed); Al-Brake (penalty scored); Ró-Ró (penalty scored)	3–2	(penalty scored) Shukurov; (penalty missed) Ashurmatov; (penalty scored) Umarov; (penalty missed) Abdurakhmatov; (penalty missed) Masharipov

Al Bayt Stadium, Al Khor
Attendance: 58,791
Referee: Kim Hee-gon (South Korea)

=== Semi-finals ===
6 February 2024
18:00

Jordan	2–0	South Korea
Al-Naimat 53'; Al-Taamari 66'	Report

Ahmad bin Ali Stadium, Al Rayyan
Attendance: 42,850
Referee: Mohammed Abdulla Hassan Mohamed (United Arab Emirates)

7 February 2024
18:00

Iran	2–3	Qatar
Azmoun 4'; Jahanbakhsh 51' (pen.)	Report	Gaber 17'; Afif 43'; Ali 82'

Al Thumama Stadium, Doha
Attendance: 40,342
Referee: Ahmad Al-Ali (Kuwait)

=== Final ===
10 February 2024
18:00

Jordan	1–3	Qatar
Al-Naimat 67'	Report	Afif 22' (pen.), 73' (pen.), 90+5' (pen.)

Lusail Stadium, Lusail
Attendance: 86,492
Referee: Ma Ning (China)

== Statistics ==
=== Goalscorers ===
There were 132 goals scored in 51 matches, for an average of 2.59 goals per match.

8 goals

- (Qatar) Akram Afif

6 goals

- (Iraq) Aymen Hussein

4 goals

- (Japan) Ayase Ueda
- (Jordan) Yazan Al-Naimat

3 goals

- (Iran) Mehdi Taremi
- (Jordan) Musa Al-Taamari
- (Palestine) Oday Dabbagh
- (Qatar) Hassan Al-Haydos
- (South Korea) Lee Kang-in
- (South Korea) Son Heung-min

2 goals

- (Australia) Martin Boyle
- (Australia) Craig Goodwin
- (Australia) Jackson Irvine
- (Iran) Sardar Azmoun
- (Iran) Mehdi Ghayedi
- (Iran) Alireza Jahanbakhsh
- (Japan) Takumi Minamino
- (Jordan) Mahmoud Al-Mardi
- (Qatar) Almoez Ali
- (Syria) Omar Khribin
- (Thailand) Supachai Chaided
- (United Arab Emirates) Sultan Adil
- (United Arab Emirates) Yahya Al-Ghassani
- (Uzbekistan) Abbosbek Fayzullaev
- (Uzbekistan) Azizbek Turgunboev

1 goal

- (Australia) Jordan Bos
- (Australia) Harry Souttar
- (Bahrain) Abdullah Al-Hashash
- (Bahrain) Abdulla Yusuf Helal
- (Bahrain) Ali Madan
- (Hong Kong) Chan Siu Kwan
- (Indonesia) Marselino Ferdinan
- (Indonesia) Asnawi Mangkualam
- (Indonesia) Sandy Walsh
- (Iran) Karim Ansarifard
- (Iran) Shojae Khalilzadeh
- (Iran) Mohammad Mohebi
- (Iraq) Mohanad Ali
- (Iraq) Saad Natiq
- (Iraq) Osama Rashid
- (Iraq) Rebin Sulaka
- (Japan) Ritsu Dōan
- (Japan) Wataru Endo
- (Japan) Takefusa Kubo
- (Japan) Hidemasa Morita
- (Japan) Keito Nakamura
- (Jordan) Yazan Al-Arab
- (Jordan) Nizar Al-Rashdan
- (Kyrgyzstan) Joel Kojo
- (Lebanon) Bassel Jradi
- (Malaysia) Arif Aiman
- (Malaysia) Faisal Halim
- (Malaysia) Romel Morales
- (Oman) Muhsen Al-Ghassani
- (Oman) Salaah Al-Yahyaei
- (Palestine) Zaid Qunbar
- (Palestine) Tamer Seyam
- (Qatar) Jassem Gaber
- (Saudi Arabia) Ali Al-Bulaihi
- (Saudi Arabia) Faisal Al-Ghamdi
- (Saudi Arabia) Abdulrahman Ghareeb
- (Saudi Arabia) Mohamed Kanno
- (Saudi Arabia) Abdullah Radif
- (South Korea) Cho Gue-sung
- (South Korea) Hwang Hee-chan
- (South Korea) Hwang In-beom
- (South Korea) Jeong Woo-yeong
- (Tajikistan) Vahdat Hanonov
- (Tajikistan) Nuriddin Khamrokulov
- (Tajikistan) Parvizdzhon Umarbayev
- (Thailand) Supachok Sarachat
- (United Arab Emirates) Khalifa Al Hammadi
- (United Arab Emirates) Zayed Sultan
- (Uzbekistan) Odiljon Hamrobekov
- (Uzbekistan) Sherzod Nasrullaev
- (Uzbekistan) Igor Sergeev
- (Vietnam) Bùi Hoàng Việt Anh
- (Vietnam) Nguyễn Đình Bắc
- (Vietnam) Nguyễn Quang Hải
- (Vietnam) Phạm Tuấn Hải

1 own goal

- (Indonesia) Elkan Baggott (against Australia)
- (Indonesia) Justin Hubner (against Japan)
- (Japan) Ayase Ueda (against Bahrain)
- (Jordan) Yazan Al-Arab (against South Korea)
- (South Korea) Park Yong-woo (against Jordan)
- (Tajikistan) Vahdat Hanonov (against Jordan)
- (United Arab Emirates) Bader Nasser (against Palestine)

Source: AFC

=== Discipline ===
A player was automatically suspended for the next match for the following offences:

- Receiving a red card (red card suspensions could be extended for serious offences)
- Receiving two yellow cards in two matches (yellow card suspensions are not carried forward to any other future international matches)
- After reaching the semi-finals, all yellow cards and red cards received are reset. This means that even if a player receives a yellow card in the semi-finals, any previous cards won't count, allowing them to participate in the final

The following suspensions occurred during the tournament:

Player(s)/Official(s)	Offence(s)	Suspension(s)
(Bahrain) Hazza Ali	Positive doping sample after Group E match vs South Korea (matchday 1; 15 January 2024) (Note: On 24 January 2024, Ali was provisionally suspended by the AFC for his positive doping test while awaiting a decision by the AFC Disciplinary and Ethics Committee. His provisional suspension was lifted on 30 January 2024.)	Group E vs Jordan (matchday 3; 25 January 2024)
(Tajikistan) Amadoni Kamolov	(red card) in Group A vs Qatar (matchday 2; 17 January 2024)	Group A vs Lebanon (matchday 3; 22 January 2024); Round of 16 vs United Arab Emirates (28 January 2024); Quarter-final vs Jordan (2 February 2024)
(Qatar) Pedro Miguel	(yellow card) in Group A vs Lebanon (matchday 1; 12 January 2024); (yellow card) in Group A vs Tajikistan (matchday 2; 17 January 2024)	Group A vs China (matchday 3; 22 January 2024)
(United Arab Emirates) Khalifa Al Hammadi	(red card) in Group C vs Palestine (matchday 2; 18 January 2024)	Group C vs Iran (matchday 3; 23 January 2024)
(United Arab Emirates) Paulo Bento (manager)	(yellow card) (yellow-red card) in Group C vs Palestine (matchday 2; 18 January 2024)	Group C vs Iran (matchday 3; 23 January 2024)
(Vietnam) Lê Phạm Thành Long	(yellow card) (yellow-red card) in Group D vs Indonesia (matchday 2; 19 January 2024)	Group D vs Iraq (matchday 3; 24 January 2024)
(Thailand) Theerathon Bunmathan	(yellow card) in Group F vs Kyrgyzstan (matchday 1; 16 January 2024); (yellow card) in Group F vs Oman (matchday 2; 21 January 2024)	Group F vs Saudi Arabia (matchday 3; 25 January 2024)
(Kyrgyzstan) Ayzar Akmatov (Kyrgyzstan) Kimi Merk	(red card) in Group F vs Saudi Arabia (matchday 2; 21 January 2024)	Group F vs Oman (matchday 3; 25 January 2024)
(Lebanon) Kassem El Zein	(red card) in Group A vs Tajikistan (matchday 3; 22 January 2024)	Suspension served outside the tournament
(Iran) Hossein Kanaanizadegan	(yellow card) in Group C vs Palestine (matchday 1; 14 January 2024); (yellow card) in Group C vs UAE (matchday 3; 23 January 2024)	Round of 16 vs Syria (31 January 2024)
(Vietnam) Khuất Văn Khang	(yellow card) (yellow-red card) in Group D vs Iraq (matchday 3; 24 January 2024)	Suspension served outside the tournament
(Iraq) Aymen Hussein	(yellow card) (yellow-red card) in Round of 16 vs Jordan (29 January 2024)	Suspension served outside the tournament
(Jordan) Hamza Al-Dardour	(red card) in Round of 16 vs Iraq (29 January 2024)	Quarter-final vs Tajikistan (2 February 2024); Semi-final vs South Korea (6 February 2024); Final vs Qatar (10 February 2024)
(Jordan) Nizar Al-Rashdan	(yellow card) in Group E vs Malaysia (matchday 1; 15 January 2024); (yellow card) in Round of 16 vs Iraq (29 January 2024)	Quarter-final vs Tajikistan (2 February 2024)
(Uzbekistan) Abdukodir Khusanov	(yellow card) in Group B vs Syria (matchday 1; 13 January 2024); (yellow card) in Round of 16 vs Thailand (30 January 2024)	Quarter-final vs Qatar (3 February 2024)
(Iran) Mehdi Taremi	(yellow card) (yellow-red card) in Round of 16 vs Syria (31 January 2024)	Quarter-final vs Japan (3 February 2024)
(Jordan) Salem Al-Ajalin (Jordan) Ali Olwan	(yellow card) in Group E vs Bahrain (matchday 3; 25 January 2024); (yellow card) in Quarter-final vs Tajikistan (2 February 2024)	Semi-final vs South Korea (6 February 2024)
(South Korea) Kim Min-jae	(yellow card) in Group E vs Bahrain (matchday 1; 15 January 2024); (yellow card) in Quarter-final vs Australia (2 February 2024)	Semi-final vs Jordan (6 February 2024)
(Australia) Aiden O'Neill	(red card) in Quarter-final vs South Korea (2 February 2024)	Suspension served outside the tournament
(Qatar) Khalid Muneer	(yellow card) in Group A vs China (matchday 3; 22 January 2024); (yellow card) in Quarter-final vs Uzbekistan (3 February 2024)	Semi-final vs Iran (7 February 2024)
(Iran) Shojae Khalilzadeh	(red card) in Semi-final vs Qatar (7 February 2024)	Suspension served outside the tournament

=== Awards ===
Most Valuable Player

- (Qatar) Akram Afif

Top Goalscorer

- (Qatar) Akram Afif (8 goals)

Best Goalkeeper

- (Qatar) Meshaal Barsham

Fair Play Award

- Qatar

Team of the Tournament

Presenters	Goalkeepers	Defenders	Midfielders	Forwards
Social networking service	(Qatar) Meshaal Barsham	(Jordan) Abdallah Nasib (Saudi Arabia) Ali Al-Bulaihi (Qatar) Lucas Mendes	(Iran) Mehdi Ghayedi (Australia) Craig Goodwin (Qatar) Hassan Al-Haydos (South Korea) Lee Kang-in	(Qatar) Akram Afif (Iraq) Aymen Hussein (Jordan) Yazan Al-Naimat
Technical Study Group (26 players)	(Qatar) Meshaal Barsham (Jordan) Yazeed Abulaila (Australia) Mathew Ryan	(Jordan) Yazan Al-Arab (Australia) Aziz Behich (Jordan) Ihsan Haddad (Tajikistan) Vahdat Hanonov (South Korea) Kim Min-jae (Qatar) Lucas Mendes (Jordan) Abdallah Nasib	(Qatar) Hassan Al-Haydos (Japan) Wataru Endo (Iran) Saeid Ezatolahi (Australia) Jackson Irvine (Iran) Alireza Jahanbakhsh (Qatar) Ahmed Fatehi (Uzbekistan) Abbosbek Fayzullaev	(Qatar) Akram Afif (Qatar) Almoez Ali (Jordan) Yazan Al-Naimat (Iran) Sardar Azmoun (South Korea) Lee Kang-in (Uzbekistan) Jaloliddin Masharipov (South Korea) Son Heung-min (Jordan) Musa Al-Taamari (Iran) Mehdi Taremi

Goal of the Tournament

- (Malaysia) Faisal Halim (against South Korea)

=== Tournament rankings ===
Ranking criteria
For teams eliminated in the same knockout round, the following criteria are applied, in the order given, to determine the final rankings:
1. Goal difference in round eliminated;
2. Goals scored in round eliminated;
3. If teams eliminated in the semi-finals or quarter-finals are tied, the above criteria are reapplied for the previous knockout round, with this process repeated once more should two semi-finalists remain tied;
4. Points in group stage;
5. Goal difference in group stage;
6. Goals scored in group stage;
7. Disciplinary points;
8. Drawing of lots.

For teams eliminated in the group stage, the following criteria are applied, in the order given, to determine the final rankings:

1. Position in group;
2. Points;
3. Goal difference;
4. Goals scored;
5. Disciplinary points;
6. Drawing of lots.

Pos	Grp	Team	Pld	W	D	L	GF	GA	GD	Pts	Final result
1	A	Qatar	7	6	1	0	14	5	+9	19	Champions
2	E	Jordan	7	4	1	2	13	8	+5	13	Runners-up
3	C	Iran	6	4	1	1	12	7	+5	13 (Note: Goal difference in semi-finals: Iran –1, South Korea –2)	Losing semi-finalists
4	E	South Korea	6	2	3	1	11	10	+1	9	Losing semi-finalists
5	B	Uzbekistan	5	2	3	0	7	3	+4	9 (Note: Goal difference in quarter-finals: Uzbekistan 0, Australia –1, Japan –1, Tajikistan –1; Goals scored in quarter-finals: Australia 1, Japan 1, Tajikistan 0; Goal difference in round of 16: Australia +4, Japan +2)	Eliminated in quarter-finals
6	B	Australia	5	3	1	1	9	3	+6	10	Eliminated in quarter-finals
7	D	Japan	5	3	0	2	12	8	+4	9	Eliminated in quarter-finals
8	A	Tajikistan	5	1	2	2	3	4	−1	5	Eliminated in quarter-finals
9	F	Saudi Arabia	4	2	2	0	5	2	+3	8 (Note: Goal difference in round of 16: Saudi Arabia 0, United Arab Emirates 0, Syria 0, Iraq –1, Thailand –1, Palestine –1, Bahrain –2, Indonesia –4; Goals scored in round of 16: Saudi Arabia 1, United Arab Emirates 1, Syria 1, Iraq 2, Thailand 1, Palestine 1; Points in group stage: Saudi Arabia 7, United Arab Emirates 4, Syria 4, Thailand 5, Palestine 4; Goal difference in group stage: United Arab Emirates +1, Syria 0)	Eliminated in round of 16
10	C	United Arab Emirates	4	1	2	1	6	5	+1	5	Eliminated in round of 16
11	B	Syria	4	1	2	1	2	2	0	5	Eliminated in round of 16
12	D	Iraq	4	3	0	1	10	7	+3	9	Eliminated in round of 16
13	F	Thailand	4	1	2	1	3	2	+1	5	Eliminated in round of 16
14	C	Palestine	4	1	1	2	6	7	−1	4	Eliminated in round of 16
15	E	Bahrain	4	2	0	2	4	6	−2	6	Eliminated in round of 16
16	D	Indonesia	4	1	0	3	3	10	−7	3	Eliminated in round of 16
17	F	Oman	3	0	2	1	2	3	−1	2	Eliminated in group stage
18	A	China	3	0	2	1	0	1	−1	2	Eliminated in group stage
19	A	Lebanon	3	0	1	2	1	5	−4	1 (Note: Disciplinary points: Lebanon 4, Kyrgyzstan 12)	Eliminated in group stage
20	F	Kyrgyzstan	3	0	1	2	1	5	−4	1	Eliminated in group stage
21	E	Malaysia	3	0	1	2	3	8	−5	1	Eliminated in group stage
22	D	Vietnam	3	0	0	3	4	8	−4	0	Eliminated in group stage
23	C	Hong Kong	3	0	0	3	1	7	−6	0	Eliminated in group stage
24	B	India	3	0	0	3	0	6	−6	0	Eliminated in group stage

Source: AFC

== Marketing ==
=== Logo and slogan ===
The official logo and TV opening of the tournament were launched during the final draw on 11 May 2023. The logo featured a silhouette of the AFC Asian Cup trophy, with the trophy lines inspired from feathers of a falcon and petals of the lotus flower. The top of the logo was colored in Qatar's national color, maroon, while the logo's tail featured an Arabic nuqta.

The tournament's slogan, "Hayya Asia", translating to "Let's go Asia!", was revealed on 5 October 2023 in an event to mark 100 days until the tournament.

=== Match ball ===
The official match ball, the VORTEXAC23 made by Kelme, was unveiled on 10 August 2023. The ball's design "incorporates Qatar’s maroon colours, echoing the nation’s identity, and mirrors the championship’s emblem at its centre." Technical assessments rigorously tested the ball's performance, ensuring its durability, quality, and readiness.

On 20 December 2023, the official match ball of the final, the VORTEXAC23+, was revealed. The ball built on the design of the VORTEXAC23 and used a predominantly gold and maroon colour scheme "to reflect the prestige of competing for the AFC Asian Cup title."

=== Official song ===
The official song of the tournament, "Hadaf" by Humood AlKhudher and Fahad Al Hajjaji, was released on 1 January 2024.

=== Mascots ===
On 2 December 2023, the tournament's official mascots were unveiled at Barahat Msheireb, Doha, through an anime-inspired animation produced by Katara Studios. The mascots were a family of five jerboas named Saboog, Tmbki, Freha, Zkriti and Traeneh, who were also the mascots of the 2011 edition when Qatar last hosted the tournament. The mascots were created by Qatari artist Ahmed Al Maadheed, with the animation directed by Fahad Al Kuwari and the song performed by Qatari artist Dana Al Meer and singer/composer Tarek Al Arabi Tourgane. Four of the five mascots were named after locations in Qatar, while Saboog was derived from the term used to refer to a jerboa in Qatar. The mascots were each created with different characteristics, akin to the different roles players undertake during a football match, and made to resemble a traditional household in Qatar.

=== Official video game ===
On 11 January 2024, Konami released a short trailer of the 2023 AFC Asian Cup game mode, and announced that it would be added to the latest release of its football video game series, eFootball 2024, in the upcoming updates. This mode features fully licensed tournament teams, licensed trophy and visuals.

==== eSports tournament ====
On 8 December 2023, the AFC announced that it would unveil the inaugural edition of AFC eAsian Cup, which was held from 1 to 5 February 2024. This eSports tournament was played on Konami's football video game - eFootball 2024. It marked the confederation's first foray into the world of eSports. Taking place at the Virtuocity eSports Arena in Doha, the event featured participants from twenty AFC member associations, who were competing in the Asian Cup.

On 6 February 2024, Indonesia won the first ever AFC eAsian Cup, winning 2–0 against Japan in the final.

=== Ticket sales ===
The first batch of tickets for the tournament, with more than 150,000 tickets, were sold out in just a week, since sales began on 10 October 2023. Another 90,000 tickets of the second batch were sold within the first 24 hours of being released on 19 November 2023. Fans from Qatar, Saudi Arabia, the Philippines, Indonesia and India bought the majority of tickets offered. In addition to the opening match between Qatar and Lebanon, the match between Saudi Arabia and Oman also led ticket sales.

Prices for match tickets started from as low as QAR 25 (approximately US$6.8) to enable greater access for the millions of fans.

On 20 November 2023, the Local Organising Committee (LOC) of the tournament announced that it would donate revenue from ticket sales to support emergency relief for Palestine, amidst the ongoing Gaza war.

On 10 January 2024, the LOC announced that nearly one million tickets had been sold for the tournament.

Ahead of the semi-final clash between Qatar and Iran, the Iranian federation complained of only 4 percent of the seats having been allocated to Iranian supporters, even though AFC regulations stated 8 percent needed to be allocated.

=== Prize money ===
Total prize money pool for the tournament was US$14,800,000, the same as it was in the 2019 edition. The champions received US$5 million, the runners-up received US$3 million, and the losing semi-finalists received US$1 million each. All 24 teams also received US$200,000 for their participation in the tournament.

=== Sponsorship ===
Official Global Partners

- Continental AG
- Credit Saison
- Neom
- Qatar Airways
- Visit Saudi
- Yili Group (Joyday, Cremo Thailand, Ambpoeial Yili, Inikin Yili)

Official Global Supporters

- Kelme
- Konami (eFootball)

Official Regional Partner

- KDDI Au (Japan)
- Kirin (Japan)
- Pepperstone (China, Indonesia, Malaysia, Thailand, Vietnam)
- Visa (West Asia)

Official Hospitality Provider

- MATCH Hospitality (Asia)

Official Video and Data Distribution Partner

- Sportradar

== Broadcasting rights ==
The broadcasters around the world that acquired the rights to the tournament included:

Territory	Broadcaster(s)	Ref.
Armenia	TV Start	
Australia	Paramount+, (Note: All matches) Network 10 (Note: Australia matches, one semi-final and final only)	
Austria	Sportdigital	
Azerbaijan	TV Start	
Bangladesh	T Sports	
Belarus	TV Start	
Belgium	Triller TV	
Bhutan	Football Sports Development Limited	
Bosnia and Herzegovina	Sport Klub	
Brazil	ESPN, Disney+	
Bulgaria	Diema Sport	
Cambodia	Hang Meas	
Canada	Paramount+	
Caribbean	ESPN	
China	IQIYI Sports, Migu, CCTV	
Croatia	Sport Klub	
East Timor	MNC Media	
Estonia	TV Start	
Fiji	Mai TV	
Finland	C More Sport	
France	Triller TV	
Georgia	Silk Sport	
Germany	Sportdigital	
Guam	Paramount+	
Hong Kong	HOY TV	
India	Sports18, DD Sports, (Note: India matches, both semi-finals and final only) JioCinema	
Indonesia	MNC Media	
In-flight/In-ship	Sport 24	
Iraq	Alrabiaa	
Ireland	Triller TV	
Israel	Sport 5	
Italy	OneFootball	
Ivory Coast	RTI	
Japan	DAZN, TV Asahi (Note: Selected Japan matches only)	
Kazakhstan	Sport+	
Kenya	Azam Sports	
Kyrgyzstan	KTRK, Saran Media International	
Laos	KJSMWorld	
Latin America	ESPN, Disney+	
Latvia	TV Start	
Liechtenstein	Sportdigital	
Lithuania	TV Start	
Luxembourg	Sportdigital	
Macau	M Plus Live	
Malawi	Azam Sports	
Malaysia	Astro SuperSport, RTM (Note: Malaysia matches only)	
Maldives	PSM	
MENA	beIN Sports	
Moldova	TV Start	
Mongolia	Premier Sports	
Montenegro	Sport Klub	
Myanmar	Canal+	
Nepal	Football Sports Development Limited	
Netherlands	Triller TV	
North Macedonia	Sport Klub	
Northern Mariana Islands	Paramount+	
Portugal	Sport TV	
Puerto Rico	Paramount+, CBS Sports	
Qatar	Al Kass	
Romania	Antena	
Russia	TV Start	
San Marino	OneFootball	
Saudi Arabia	Shahid, SSC	
Serbia	Sport Klub	
Singapore	Mediacorp	
Slovenia	Sport Klub	
South Korea	Coupang, tvN SPORTS	
Spain	LaLiga+	
Sri Lanka	Football Sports Development Limited	
Sub-Saharan Africa	StarTimes	
South America	ESPN	
Sweden	C More Sport	
Switzerland	Sportdigital	
Taiwan	ELTA	
Tajikistan	TV Varzish, TV Football, Saran Media International	
Tanzania	Azam Sports	
Thailand	PPTV, T Sports 7	
Turkey	D-Smart	
Turkmenistan	Turkmenistan Sport, Saran Media International	
Uganda	Azam Sports	
Ukraine	Sport1	
United Arab Emirates	Abu Dhabi Media	
United Kingdom	Triller TV	
United States	Paramount+, CBS Sports	
Uzbekistan	MTRK, Saran Media International	
Vietnam	FPT, VTV	
Zimbabwe	Azam Sports	

== See also ==
- 2024 AFC U-23 Asian Cup
- 2023 AFC U-20 Asian Cup
- 2023 AFC U-17 Asian Cup
- 2023 Africa Cup of Nations
- 2023 CONCACAF Gold Cup
