= Ali Madan =

Bahraini footballer (born 1995)

Personal information
- Full name: Ali Jaafar Mohamed Ahmed Madan
- Date of birth: 30 November 1995 (age 30)
- Place of birth: Jidhafs, Bahrain
- Height: 1.67 m (5 ft 6 in)
- Position: Winger

Team information
- Current team: Al-Riffa
- Number: 7

Senior career*
Years	Team	Apps	(Gls)
2013–2018	Al-Shabab		
2018–2020	Al-Najma		(13)
2020–	Al-Riffa		(6)
2021–2022	→ Al Urooba (loan)	25	(7)
2022–2024	→ Ajman (loan)	46	(11)
2025	→ Ajman (loan)	14	(1)

International career^{‡}
2015–2017	Bahrain U23	9	(4)
2016–	Bahrain	102	(15)
Medal record
Men's football
Representing Bahrain
Gulf Cup
Winner	2024 Kuwait
- * Club domestic league appearances and goals as of 12:39, 13 March 2020 (UTC) ‡ National team caps and goals as of 30 September 2026 (UTC)

Ali Jaafar Mohamed Ahmed Madan (Arabic: عَلِيّ جَعْفَر مُحَمَّد أَحْمَد مَدَن; born 30 November 1995) is a Bahraini footballer who plays as a winger for Al-Riffa and the Bahrain national team.

== International career ==
Madan was included in Bahrain's squad for the 2019 AFC Asian Cup in the United Arab Emirates. He was called up to participate in the 24th Arabian Gulf Cup in Qatar. On 5 December 2019, Madan scored the crucial penalty against Iraq which qualified Bahrain to the tournament's final.

On 20 January 2024, Madan scored a crucial last minute goal against Malaysia in their 1–0 win at the 2023 AFC Asian Cup tournament. Called up for the Bahraini national team, and won the gulf cup for the second time. (24–25) Has scored 2 goals in 4 matches in the 24-25 gulf cup.

== Career statistics ==
=== International ===
As of 30 September 2026

Bahrain
Year	Apps	Goals
2016	6	0
2017	12	3
2018	7	1
2019	15	1
2020	3	0
2021	16	6
2022	12	0
2023	12	0
2024	17	4
2025	13	0
2026	4	1
Total	102	16

==== International goals ====
Scores and results list Bahrain's goal tally first.

No.	Date	Venue	Opponent	Score	Result	Competition
1.	5 September 2017	Bahrain National Stadium, Riffa, Bahrain	Chinese Taipei	2–0	5–0	2019 AFC Asian Cup qualification
2.	9 November 2017	Mong Kok Stadium, Kowloon, Hong Kong	Hong Kong	1–0	2–0	Friendly
3.	29 December 2017	Jaber Al-Ahmad International Stadium, Kuwait City, Kuwait	Qatar	1–1	1–1	23rd Arabian Gulf Cup
4.	20 December 2018	Khalifa Sports City Stadium, Isa Town, Bahrain	Tajikistan	3–0	5–0	Friendly
5.	2 December 2019	Khalifa International Stadium, Doha, Qatar	Kuwait	1–0	4–2	24th Arabian Gulf Cup
6.	3 June 2021	Bahrain National Stadium, Riffa, Bahrain	Cambodia	3–0	8–0	2022 FIFA World Cup qualification
7.	3 June 2021	Bahrain National Stadium, Riffa, Bahrain	Cambodia	5–0	8–0	2022 FIFA World Cup qualification
8.	1 September 2021	Bahrain National Stadium, Riffa, Bahrain	Haiti	1–0	6–1	Friendly
9.	1 September 2021	Bahrain National Stadium, Riffa, Bahrain	Haiti	5–0	6–1	Friendly
10.	6 October 2021	Bahrain National Stadium, Riffa, Bahrain	Curaçao	2–0	4–0	Friendly
11.	16 November 2021	Bahrain National Stadium, Riffa, Bahrain	Kyrgyzstan	1–1	4–2	Friendly
12.	20 January 2024	Jassim bin Hamad Stadium, Al Rayyan, Qatar	Malaysia	1–0	1–0	2023 AFC Asian Cup
13.	21 March 2024	Bahrain National Stadium, Riffa, Bahrain	Nepal	3–0	5–0	2026 FIFA World Cup qualification
14.	25 December 2024	Jaber Al-Ahmad International Stadium, Kuwait City, Kuwait	Iraq	1–0	2–0	26th Arabian Gulf Cup
15.	25 December 2024	Jaber Al-Ahmad International Stadium, Kuwait City, Kuwait	Iraq	2–0	2–0	26th Arabian Gulf Cup
16.	30 September 2026	Prince Abdullah Al-Faisal Sports City Stadium, Jeddah, Saudi Arabia	Yemen	2–4	2–5	27th Arabian Gulf Cup
