= 2023 AFC Asian Cup Group D =

Football tournament details

Group D of the 2023 AFC Asian Cup took place from 14 to 24 January 2024. The group consisted of Japan, Indonesia, Iraq and Vietnam. The top two teams, Iraq and Japan, along with third-placed Indonesia (as one of the four best third-placed teams), advanced to the round of 16.

== Teams ==
Draw position	Team	Zone	Method of qualification	Date of qualification	Finals appearance	Last appearance	Previous best performance	FIFA Rankings	
Draw position	Team	Zone	Method of qualification	Date of qualification	Finals appearance	Last appearance	Previous best performance	April 2023 (Note: The rankings of April 2023 were used for seeding for the final draw.)	December 2023
D1	Japan	EAFF	Second round Group F winners	28 May 2021	10th	2019	Winners (1992, 2000, 2004, 2011)	20	17
D2	Indonesia	AFF	Third round Group A runners-up	14 June 2022	5th	2007	Group stage (1996, 2000, 2004, 2007)	149	146
D3	Iraq	WAFF	Second round Group C runners-up	15 June 2021	10th	2019	Winners (2007)	67	63
D4	Vietnam	AFF	Second round Group G runners-up	15 June 2021	5th	2019	Fourth place (1956, (Note: As South Vietnam) 1960)	95	94

== Standings ==
Pos	Team	Pld	W	D	L	GF	GA	GD	Pts	Qualification
1	Iraq	3	3	0	0	8	4	+4	9	Advance to knockout stage
2	Japan	3	2	0	1	8	5	+3	6	Advance to knockout stage
3	Indonesia	3	1	0	2	3	6	−3	3	Advance to knockout stage
4	Vietnam	3	0	0	3	4	8	−4	0	

Source: AFC
Rules for classification: Group stage tiebreakers

== Matches ==
=== Japan vs Vietnam ===
This was the thirteenth meeting between the sides and the sixth since Vietnam's reunification, with their most recent encounter coming during 2022 FIFA World Cup qualification, with Vietnam drawing 1–1 Japan away. Japan had won four out of five previous meetings, but three out of four of these victories were by just a one-goal margin; Japan's biggest win occurred back during the 2007 Asian Cup when they beat the tournament co-hosts 4–1. In the sides' most recent Asian Cup encounter in 2019, Japan also clinched a hard-fought 1–0 win.

Japan kickstarted their tournament with a perfectly coordinated corner kick, which Takumi Minamino wasted no time in converting to give Japan the lead in the 11th minute. However, Vietnam then staged an unexpected fightback, first with Nguyễn Đình Bắc's reverse header to equalise in the 16th minute, before a perfect set-piece attack from Bùi Hoàng Việt Anh saw Japanese goalkeeper Zion Suzuki mishandle the ball to allow Phạm Tuấn Hải to convert into the empty net, giving Vietnam a 2–1 lead in the 33rd minute. However, Minamino would go on to restore balance with a low shot after an effort from skipper Wataru Endo in the 45th minute, before Keito Nakamura produced a brilliant long-range shot to beat Filip Nguyen, as Japan reclaimed their lead in the fifth minute of first-half stoppage time. In the second half, Japan increased their pressure and put Vietnam on the defensive, but would not secure the victory until the 85th minute, when Ayase Ueda capitalised on poor defending from the Vietnamese to strike a fourth goal for Japan.

This was the first time since 2007 that Japan managed to defeat Vietnam by more than a one-goal margin and, within their eleven-match winning streak dating back to June 2023, this victory was the tenth time they scored four goals or more. Meanwhile, Vietnam became the first national team since Turkey in September 2023 (who also lost 4–2) to score two goals against Japan, but the first since Colombia in March of the same year to take the lead against the Japanese. Vietnam were also the first Asian national team to score at least two goals against Japan since Qatar did so in the 2019 AFC Asian Cup final.

14 January 2024
14:30

Japan	4–2	Vietnam
Minamino 11', 45'; Nakamura 45+4'; Ueda 85'	Report	Nguyễn Đình Bắc 16'; Phạm Tuấn Hải 33'

Al Thumama Stadium, Doha
Attendance: 17,385
Referee: Kim Jong-hyeok (South Korea)

Japan	Vietnam

GK	23	Zion Suzuki
RB	2	Yukinari Sugawara	(yellow card) 32'	(substituted off) 77'
CB	4	Ko Itakura
CB	3	Shogo Taniguchi
LB	21	Hiroki Itō
CM	6	Wataru Endo (c)
CM	5	Hidemasa Morita		(substituted off) 76'
RW	14	Junya Itō
AM	8	Takumi Minamino		(substituted off) 84'
LW	13	Keito Nakamura		(substituted off) 63'
CF	11	Mao Hosoya		(substituted off) 46'
Substitutions:
FW	9	Ayase Ueda		(substituted on) 46'
MF	10	Ritsu Dōan		(substituted on) 63'
MF	26	Kaishū Sano		(substituted on) 76'
DF	16	Seiya Maikuma		(substituted on) 77'
MF	20	Takefusa Kubo		(substituted on) 84'
Manager:
Hajime Moriyasu

GK	1	Filip Nguyen
CB	6	Nguyễn Thanh Bình
CB	20	Bùi Hoàng Việt Anh
CB	12	Phan Tuấn Tài
RM	7	Phạm Xuân Mạnh	(substituted off) 78'
CM	16	Nguyễn Thái Sơn
CM	11	Nguyễn Tuấn Anh	(substituted off) 46'
LM	3	Võ Minh Trọng	(substituted off) 64'
RF	8	Đỗ Hùng Dũng (c)
CF	10	Phạm Tuấn Hải
LF	15	Nguyễn Đình Bắc	(substituted off) 64'
Substitutions:
MF	25	Lê Phạm Thành Long	(substituted on) 46'
FW	14	Nguyễn Văn Trường	(substituted on) 64'
MF	22	Khuất Văn Khang	(substituted on) 64'
MF	13	Trương Tiến Anh	(substituted on) 78'
Manager:
(France) Philippe Troussier

Man of the Match:
Takumi Minamino (Japan)

Assistant referees:
Yoo Jae-yeol (South Korea)
Park Sang-jun (South Korea)
Fourth official:
Mooud Bonyadifard (Iran)
Reserve assistant referee:
Saeid Ghashemi (Iran)
Video assistant referee:
Kim Hee-gon (South Korea)
Assistant video assistant referees:
Ko Hyung-jin (South Korea)

=== Indonesia vs Iraq ===
The sides had most recently met during 2026 FIFA World Cup qualification, with Iraq securing a 5–1 victory. Iraq had never previously lost to Indonesia, with one draw and six wins, but this was the first time the two faced each other in the group stage of an Asian Cup.

The match started with a high tempo, with Iraq piling pressure against an energetic Indonesian side. In the 17th minute, an attempt to clear Amir Al-Ammari's pass by Justin Hubner ended up deflecting to Mohanad Ali, and Ali successfully overcame the two remaining Indonesian defenders to hit the target and give Iraq the lead. Indonesia would reply twenty minutes later, when Asnawi Mangkualam gave the ball to Yakob Sayuri, who then made a one-two play with Ivar Jenner, who took advantage of Iraq's free left side to deliver a lethal cross for Marselino Ferdinan to strike an equaliser. Ten minutes later, in the seventh minute of first-half stoppage time, a fight for the ball between Indonesian and Iraqi players was seized upon by Iraq's Zidane Iqbal, who sent it to Ali Jasim. Jasim then took a powerful shot, and although it was initially denied by goalkeeper Ernando Ari, it deflected wide enough to allow Osama Rashid to score to regain Iraq's lead. In the 75th minute, Aymen Hussein won an aerial duel over Rizky Ridho via a high ball by Hussein Ali, before skilfully converting a decisive shot to secure Iraq the win.

Indonesia lost their opening match at an Asian Cup for the first time. In scoring their equaliser, Marselino became the youngest Indonesian to ever score at the Asian Cup and only their second ever midfielder to score an Asian Cup goal—after Ponaryo Astaman in 2004.

15 January 2024
17:30

Indonesia	1–3	Iraq
Marselino 37'	Report	M. Ali 17'; Rashid 45+7'; Hussein 75'

Ahmad bin Ali Stadium, Al Rayyan
Attendance: 16,532
Referee: Ilgiz Tantashev (Uzbekistan)

Indonesia	Iraq

GK	21	Ernando Ari
CB	5	Rizky Ridho		(substituted off) 88'
CB	4	Jordi Amat
CB	3	Elkan Baggott	(yellow card) 2'	(substituted off) 76'
RM	14	Asnawi Mangkualam (c)		(substituted off) 46'
CM	24	Ivar Jenner		(substituted off) 76'
CM	25	Justin Hubner
LM	12	Pratama Arhan
RF	2	Yakob Sayuri
CF	11	Rafael Struick		(substituted off) 76'
LF	7	Marselino Ferdinan
Substitutions:
MF	8	Witan Sulaeman		(substituted on) 46'
FW	9	Dimas Drajad		(substituted on) 76'
MF	15	Ricky Kambuaya		(substituted on) 76'
MF	23	Marc Klok	(yellow card) 90+5'	(substituted on) 76'
DF	6	Sandy Walsh		(substituted on) 88'
Manager:
(South Korea) Shin Tae-yong

GK	12	Jalal Hassan (c)
RB	4	Saad Natiq
CB	3	Hussein Ali
CB	6	Ali Adnan	(substituted off) 88'
LB	23	Merchas Doski
CM	20	Osama Rashid	(substituted off) 71'
CM	16	Amir Al-Ammari	(substituted off) 88'
RW	8	Ibrahim Bayesh
AM	11	Zidane Iqbal	(substituted off) 60'
LW	17	Ali Jasim
CF	10	Mohanad Ali	(substituted off) 60'
Substitutions:
FW	18	Aymen Hussein	(substituted on) 60'
FW	13	Bashar Resan	(substituted on) 60'
MF	7	Youssef Amyn	(substituted on) 71'
DF	5	Frans Putros	(substituted on) 88'
DF	2	Rebin Sulaka	(substituted on) 88'
Manager:
(Spain) Jesús Casas

Man of the Match:
Ali Jasim (Iraq)

Assistant referees:
Andrey Tsapenko (Uzbekistan)
Timur Gaynullin (Uzbekistan)
Fourth official:
Sadullo Gulmurodi (Tajikistan)
Reserve assistant referee:
Rawut Nakarit (Thailand)
Video assistant referee:
Salman Falahi (Qatar)
Assistant video assistant referees:
Sivakorn Pu-Udom (Thailand)

=== Iraq vs Japan ===
The sides had last met in a competitive fixture during 2018 FIFA World Cup qualification, with Iraq holding Japan to a 1–1 draw. Their most recent Asian Cup meeting was in 2015, where Japan won 1–0. Iraq had not defeated Japan since 1982, and had never won a competitive fixture against the side.

Iraq quickly applied pressure against a disorganised Japanese side in the first minutes, and it paid off when Ahmed Yahya received a pinpoint heading pass from Aymen Hussein which was quickly delivered to Ali Jasim, who snuck into the Japanese penalty area before putting in an impressive cross; despite initially being kept out by goalkeeper Zion Suzuki, the ball rebounded right to Hussein, who then converted a header to open the scoring for Iraq. The Japanese struggled against a highly cohesive Iraqi side, and while continuing to seek an equaliser during first-half stoppage time, Yahya once again overcame the Japanese players from midfield, before going on a darting run into the penalty area and sending another clinical pass to Hussein, whose header doubled Iraq's lead. Japan increased pressure in the second half, but couldn't respond with a goal until the third minute of stoppage time, when Wataru Endo converted from a header via a corner kick. This effort would ultimately be a consolation, as Iraq held on for an unexpected victory.

Considered the biggest upset of the competition up to that point, this victory was Iraq's first over Japan in a competitive tournament, having failed to come out on top in seven previous meetings, and their first win against the Japanese of any kind since 1982. This result also put an end to Japan's undefeated streak that had begun back in June 2023 with a 6–0 win over El Salvador. At the same time, this was the second consecutive tournament in which Japan lost during their second matchday, having suffered a 1–0 defeat to Costa Rica at the 2022 FIFA World Cup.

19 January 2024
14:30

Iraq	2–1	Japan
Hussein 5', 45+4'	Report	Endo 90+3'

Education City Stadium, Al Rayyan
Attendance: 38,663
Referee: Khalid Al-Turais (Saudi Arabia)

Iraq	Japan

GK	12	Jalal Hassan (c)
RB	3	Hussein Ali		(substituted off) 46'
CB	4	Saad Natiq	(yellow card) 15'
CB	25	Ahmed Yahya
LB	2	Rebin Sulaka
CM	5	Frans Putros		(substituted off) 61'
CM	16	Amir Al-Ammari
RW	7	Youssef Amyn		(substituted off) 66'
AM	8	Ibrahim Bayesh
LW	17	Ali Jasim		(substituted off) 77'
CF	18	Aymen Hussein		(substituted off) 46'
Substitutions:
FW	10	Mohanad Ali		(substituted on) 46'
DF	23	Merchas Doski		(substituted on) 46'
MF	20	Osama Rashid		(substituted on) 61'
DF	6	Ali Adnan		(substituted on) 66'
DF	24	Zaid Tahseen		(substituted on) 77'
Manager:
(Spain) Jesús Casas

GK	23	Zion Suzuki
RB	2	Yukinari Sugawara
CB	4	Ko Itakura
CB	3	Shogo Taniguchi		(substituted off) 46'
LB	21	Hiroki Itō
CM	6	Wataru Endo (c)
CM	5	Hidemasa Morita		(substituted off) 74'
RW	14	Junya Itō	(yellow card) 37'	(substituted off) 74'
AM	20	Takefusa Kubo		(substituted off) 61'
LW	8	Takumi Minamino
CF	18	Takuma Asano		(substituted off) 61'
Substitutions:
DF	22	Takehiro Tomiyasu		(substituted on) 46'
FW	9	Ayase Ueda		(substituted on) 61'
MF	10	Ritsu Dōan		(substituted on) 61'
MF	17	Reo Hatate		(substituted on) 74'
FW	25	Daizen Maeda		(substituted on) 74'
Manager:
Hajime Moriyasu

Man of the Match:
Aymen Hussein (Iraq)

Assistant referees:
Zaid Al-Shammari (Saudi Arabia)
Yasir Al-Sultan (Saudi Arabia)
Fourth official:
Nazmi Nasaruddin (Malaysia)
Reserve assistant referee:
Mohd Arif Shamil bin Abd Rasid (Malaysia)
Video assistant referee:
Khamis Al-Marri (Qatar)
Assistant video assistant referees:
Mohammed Al Hoish (Saudi Arabia)

=== Vietnam vs Indonesia ===
Vietnam and Indonesia had met each other 27 times since Vietnam's unification, with both sharing an equal eight wins and eight losses each. Their most recent competitive fixture was in 2021 as part of the 2022 FIFA World Cup qualification, which Vietnam won 4–0. Vietnam had not lost to Indonesia since 2016. This was their first ever meeting at the AFC Asian Cup finals and was also the first ever Asian Cup match between two Southeast Asian sides.

The match started with high tempo but it was Indonesia who got the opportunities first, before Vietnam slowly reclaimed the game. However, as Vietnam and Indonesia were equally struggling, a pulling foul from Nguyễn Thanh Bình to Rafael Struick on Vietnam's penalty area at the 40th minute resulted in a penalty, which Asnawi Mangkualam converted for what turned out to be the only goal of the match, despite Vietnamese attempts to equalise due to their poor finishes. Asnawi's goal was Indonesia's first ever Asian Cup goal scored from the spot, and the first ever scored by a defender. At the first minute of the second half's extra time, Lê Phạm Thành Long fouled Marselino Ferdinan near Vietnam's penalty area as Ferdinand was pulling a phase against an almost empty Vietnamese defense, resulting in his second yellow card and dismissal. On the last minute of extra time, Vietnam got a last chance of a corner-kick, but failed to utilize it and consequently, ensured Vietnam's defeat in this match.

Following this outcome, Vietnam were assured to finish bottom of the group. This was the first time Vietnam failed to advance past the group stage of an AFC Asian Cup; previous participations of South Vietnam back in 1956 and 1960 only had one round-robin finals, while as a unified country, Vietnam were eliminated in the 2007 and 2019 quarter-finals, the country's best Asian Cup performance since the reunification; while Indonesia won against Vietnam for the first time since the 2016 AFF Championship semi-final first leg. This was Indonesia's first Asian Cup win since the 2007 first matchday win against Bahrain and only their third ever. It was also their first Asian Cup match to end in a shutout since 2000, their first ever Asian Cup win accompanied with a shutout, and their first Asian Cup victory happening after the first match.

On personal record, it was the third consecutive overall and second consecutive senior defeat to Indonesia for Vietnam's coach Philippe Troussier, who had never won against Indonesia in his career. He previously managed Qatar when they lost 2–1 to Indonesia — the country's first ever Asian Cup win — in the first matchday of the 2004 AFC Asian Cup group stage. His Qatar side finished bottom of the group, much like Vietnam in 2023.

19 January 2024
17:30

Vietnam	0–1	Indonesia
	Report	Asnawi 42' (pen.)

Abdullah bin Khalifa Stadium, Doha
Attendance: 7,253
Referee: Sadullo Gulmurodi (Tajikistan)

Vietnam	Indonesia

GK	1	Filip Nguyen
CB	6	Nguyễn Thanh Bình
CB	20	Bùi Hoàng Việt Anh
CB	12	Phan Tuấn Tài
RM	7	Phạm Xuân Mạnh		(substituted off) 89'
CM	11	Nguyễn Tuấn Anh
CM	16	Nguyễn Thái Sơn		(substituted off) 46'
LM	3	Võ Minh Trọng
RF	19	Nguyễn Quang Hải (c)		(substituted off) 72'
CF	24	Nguyễn Văn Tùng		(substituted off) 79'
LF	10	Phạm Tuấn Hải		(substituted off) 46'
Substitutions:
MF	25	Lê Phạm Thành Long	(yellow card) 83' (yellow-red card) 90+1'	(substituted on) 46'
FW	22	Khuất Văn Khang		(substituted on) 46'
FW	9	Nguyễn Văn Toàn		(substituted on) 72'
FW	14	Nguyễn Văn Trường		(substituted on) 79'
DF	17	Vũ Văn Thanh		(substituted on) 89'
Manager:
(France) Philippe Troussier

GK	21	Ernando Ari
CB	6	Sandy Walsh
CB	4	Jordi Amat		(substituted off) 69'
CB	25	Justin Hubner
RM	14	Asnawi Mangkualam (c)		(substituted off) 56'
CM	24	Ivar Jenner
CM	7	Marselino Ferdinan
LM	12	Pratama Arhan	(yellow card) 80'
RF	2	Yakob Sayuri	(yellow card) 90+10'
CF	11	Rafael Struick		(substituted off) 68'
LF	10	Egy Maulana Vikri		(substituted off) 67'
Substitutions:
MF	8	Witan Sulaeman		(substituted on) 56'
MF	17	Adam Alis		(substituted on) 67'
FW	16	Hokky Caraka		(substituted on) 68'
DF	5	Rizky Ridho		(substituted on) 69'
Manager:
(South Korea) Shin Tae-yong

Man of the Match:
Bùi Hoàng Việt Anh (Vietnam)

Assistant referees:
Andrey Tsapenko (Uzbekistan)
Timur Gaynullin (Uzbekistan)
Fourth official:
Ilgiz Tantashev (Uzbekistan)
Reserve assistant referee:
Ronnie Koh Min Kiat (Singapore)
Video assistant referee:
Sivakorn Pu-udom (Thailand)
Assistant video assistant referees:
Fu Ming (China)

=== Japan vs Indonesia ===
Japan met Indonesia competitively for the first time since 1989 when Japan beat Indonesia 5–0 as part of the 1990 FIFA World Cup qualification. This was also the first time the two meet in the Asian Cup.

Japan completely proved too much for Indonesia and at the third minute, Ayase Ueda's dribbling effort resulted in him brought down at the penalty area by Jordi Amat, before VAR intervened to give Japan the penalty; Ueda himself converted neatly to give Japan the lead. Japan's rampant pressure on Indonesia became increasingly more persistent later on before Ueda once again made his mark when, from a brilliant pass by Ritsu Dōan to Keito Nakamura, Dōan sneaked into Indonesia's right flank before receiving back the ball from Nakamura, then he delivered a low but lethal enough pass for Ueda to score the second at the 52nd minute. Japan completed the match at the 88th minute when, from a brilliant run by Junya Itō, Ueda provided a brilliant shot, which hit the foot of Justin Hubner before deflecting to Indonesia's own net. Despite Sandy Walsh scored a goal in stoppage time by pulling one back from an erroneous header by Takumi Minamino through Pratama Arhan long throw-in, it proved too late as Japan triumphed to finish second of the group.

Indonesia for the first time ever managed to score in all group stage games at an Asian Cup edition. Following Kyrgyzstan and Oman falling to a 1–1 draw, Indonesia managed to advance past the Asian Cup group stage for the first time ever. In terms of the ASEAN Football Federation, Indonesia's success equalled the record of three AFF teams in the Asian Cup knockout stage set four years previously.

24 January 2024
14:30

Japan	3–1	Indonesia
Ueda 6' (pen.), 52'; Hubner 88' (o.g.)	Report	Walsh 90+1'

Al Thumama Stadium, Doha
Attendance: 26,453
Referee: Khamis Al-Marri (Qatar)

Japan	Indonesia

GK	23	Zion Suzuki
RB	16	Seiya Maikuma
CB	22	Takehiro Tomiyasu		(substituted off) 82'
CB	15	Kōki Machida
LB	19	Yūta Nakayama
DM	6	Wataru Endo (c)	(yellow card) 68'
CM	20	Takefusa Kubo		(substituted off) 82'
CM	17	Reo Hatate		(substituted off) 69'
RF	10	Ritsu Dōan		(substituted off) 86'
CF	9	Ayase Ueda
LF	13	Keito Nakamura		(substituted off) 69'
Substitutions:
MF	8	Takumi Minamino	(yellow card) 70'	(substituted on) 69'
FW	25	Daizen Maeda		(substituted on) 69'
MF	26	Kaishū Sano		(substituted on) 82'
DF	24	Tsuyoshi Watanabe		(substituted on) 82'
MF	14	Junya Itō		(substituted on) 86'
Manager:
Hajime Moriyasu

GK	21	Ernando Ari
CB	5	Rizky Ridho
CB	4	Jordi Amat (c)	(yellow card) 77'
CB	25	Justin Hubner	(yellow card) 78'
RM	6	Sandy Walsh
CM	24	Ivar Jenner
CM	7	Marselino Ferdinan
LM	12	Pratama Arhan
RF	10	Egy Maulana Vikri		(substituted off) 73'
CF	11	Rafael Struick	(yellow card) 42'	(substituted off) 89'
LF	2	Yakob Sayuri		(substituted off) 54'
Substitutions:
MF	8	Witan Sulaeman		(substituted on) 54'
DF	3	Elkan Baggott		(substituted on) 73'
MF	15	Ricky Kambuaya		(substituted on) 89'
Manager:
(South Korea) Shin Tae-yong

Man of the Match:
Ayase Ueda (Japan)

Assistant referees:
Taleb Al-Marri (Qatar)
Saoud Al-Maqaleh (Qatar)
Fourth official:
Sadullo Gulmurodi (Tajikistan)
Reserve assistant referee:
Mohamad Kazzaz (Syria)
Video assistant referee:
Salman Ahmad Falahi (Qatar)
Assistant video assistant referees:
Muhammad Taqi (Singapore)

=== Iraq vs Vietnam ===
Iraq and Vietnam met each other for the second consecutive AFC Asian Cup. They had met in two competitive Asian Cup encounters in 2007 and 2019, both ended with Iraq's victories. Their most recent competitive meeting happened in the 2026 FIFA World Cup qualification, which also ended with Iraq claiming the win, although all of Iraq's wins since 2007 happened to be mostly hard-fought matches, all ended by just one-goal margin.

Despite Iraq having rotated most of the squad and combined with the outcomes confirmed for both sides, the Iraqis were the ones to have the better start, but, despite Iraq being more dominant, they were frightened for a while with an own goal from Zaid Tahseen only to be ruled offside because of Khuất Văn Khang's slightly involved in the attack. At the 42nd minute, from a surprise set-piece effort, Bùi Hoàng Việt Anh sneaked in to struck Vietnam's first goal to the surprise of the Iraqis. However, Vietnam were reduced to ten men after Văn Khang appeared to have kicked the back of Merchas Doski at the sixth minute of extra time. Iraq capitalised from this advantage when the game restarted at the 47th minute when from a corner, Rebin Sulaka struck a header to equalise and sending raucous Iraqi fans to celebrate. Aymen Hussein further strengthened Iraq's lead when from yet another attack, Ali Jasim gave a clinical pass for Hussein to score from another header at the 73rd minute, and Hussein then had a chance to extend Iraq's lead from the penalty spot but saw his effort hit the post. Vietnam brought the scores level at the first minute of added time when Nguyễn Quang Hải proved quicker despite chased by Iraqi defenders, when from a string of combined headers by Nguyễn Văn Toàn and Nguyễn Thanh Bình, he sent the ball home to the left corner to bring the game to level. At the 11th minute of extra time, a foul by Võ Minh Trọng on Youssef Amyn resulted in a penalty, which this time Hussein converted to seal victory for Iraq.

This marked for the first time, Iraq won all nine points at the group stage and their first since 2007, when Iraq were crowned champions, that they topped the table. Despite the spirited fight back, Vietnam ended up setting a dismal record as the fourth national team from the ASEAN Football Federation to not register a single point at the Asian Cup group stage, after Thailand in 1996 and 2004, Malaysia in 2007, and the Philippines in 2019; this result also meant Australia were the only national team from the AFF to have never been eliminated at the group stage. This was also the worst-ever record for Philippe Troussier as coach in any major tournament, when it was the first time his team failed to register even a point, having successfully gained points when he coached Burkina Faso (at the 1998 Africa Cup of Nations), South Africa (at the 1998 FIFA World Cup), Japan (at the 1999 Copa América, 2000 AFC Asian Cup, 2001 FIFA Confederations Cup, and 2002 FIFA World Cup) and Qatar (at the 2004 AFC Asian Cup).

24 January 2024
14:30

Iraq	3–2	Vietnam
Sulaka 47'; Hussein 73', 90+12' (pen.)	Report	Bùi Hoàng Việt Anh 42'; Nguyễn Quang Hải 90+1'

Jassim bin Hamad Stadium, Al Rayyan
Attendance: 8,932
Referee: Nazmi Nasaruddin (Malaysia)

Iraq	Vietnam

GK	22	Ahmed Basil
RB	15	Allan Mohideen		(substituted off) 67'
CB	24	Zaid Tahseen
CB	2	Rebin Sulaka
LB	23	Merchas Doski
DM	20	Osama Rashid		(substituted off) 82'
CM	21	Ahmad Allée		(substituted off) 46'
CM	11	Zidane Iqbal
RF	26	Montader Madjed	(yellow card) 51'	(substituted off) 58'
CF	9	Ali Al-Hamadi
LF	13	Bashar Resan (c)		(substituted off) 46'
Substitutions:
FW	17	Ali Jasim		(substituted on) 46'
FW	18	Aymen Hussein		(substituted on) 46'
MF	7	Youssef Amyn		(substituted on) 58'
MF	8	Ibrahim Bayesh		(substituted on) 67'
DF	5	Frans Putros		(substituted on) 82'
Manager:
(Spain) Jesús Casas

GK	1	Filip Nguyen
CB	20	Bùi Hoàng Việt Anh	(yellow card) 82'
CB	12	Phan Tuấn Tài		(substituted off) 52'
CB	26	Lê Ngọc Bảo		(substituted off) 77'
RM	7	Phạm Xuân Mạnh		(substituted off) 77'
CM	11	Nguyễn Tuấn Anh		(substituted off) 52'
CM	16	Nguyễn Thái Sơn	(yellow card) 45+4'
LM	3	Võ Minh Trọng
RF	8	Đỗ Hùng Dũng (c)
CF	22	Khuất Văn Khang	(yellow card) 6' (yellow-red card) 45+4'
LF	15	Nguyễn Đình Bắc		(substituted off) 46'
Substitutions:
FW	9	Nguyễn Văn Toàn		(substituted on) 46'
DF	6	Nguyễn Thanh Bình		(substituted on) 52'
MF	19	Nguyễn Quang Hải		(substituted on) 52'
DF	17	Vũ Văn Thanh		(substituted on) 77'
DF	2	Đỗ Duy Mạnh		(substituted on) 77'
Manager:
(France) Philippe Troussier

Man of the Match:
Aymen Hussein (Iraq)

Assistant referees:
Mohamad Zairul bin Khalil Tan (Malaysia)
Mohd Arif Shamil bin Abd Rasid (Malaysia)
Fourth official:
Alireza Faghani (Australia)
Reserve assistant referee:
Abdul Hannan bin Abdul Hasim (Singapore)
Video assistant referee:
Fu Ming (China)
Assistant video assistant referees:
Sivakorn Pu-udom (Thailand)

== Discipline ==
Fair play points would have been used as tiebreakers if the overall and head-to-head records of teams were tied. These were calculated based on yellow and red cards received in all group matches as follows:

- first yellow card: −1 point;
- indirect red card (second yellow card): −3 points;
- direct red card: −3 points;
- yellow card and direct red card: −4 points;

Only one of the above deductions was applied to a player in a single match.

Team	Match 1				Match 2				Match 3				Points
Team	Booked	(yellow card) (yellow-red card)	Sent off (straight red)	(yellow card) (red card)	Booked	(yellow card) (yellow-red card)	Sent off (straight red)	(yellow card) (red card)	Booked	(yellow card) (yellow-red card)	Sent off (straight red)	(yellow card) (red card)	Points
Japan	1				1				2				–4
Indonesia	2				2				3				–7
Iraq					1				1				–2
Vietnam						1			2	1			–8
