= Al Thumama Stadium =

Football stadium in Qatar

Al-Thumama Stadium
- ملعب الثمامة (Arabic)
- Exterior night-time view of the stadium
- Interactive map of Al-Thumama Stadium
- Location: Al Quds Street 6GPJ+8X4; Al Thumama, Doha, Qatar
- Coordinates: 25°14′07″N 51°31′56″E
- Owner: Qatar 2022 Supreme Committee
- Capacity: 44,400
- Surface: Grass
- Record attendance: 44,198 (Morocco vs Portugal, 10 December 2022)

Construction
- Opened: 21 October 2021
- Architects: Ibrahim M. Jaidah; Heerim
- Structural engineers: Schlaich Bergermann Partners; Thornton Tomasetti
- Services engineers: Jain and Partners
- Main contractors: Al Jaber Engineering; Tekfen Construction

Tenants
- Al-Arabi SC (2023–present); Qatar national football team (selected matches)

Al-Thumama Stadium (Arabic: ملعب الثمامة, romanized: Malʿab ath-Thumāma) is a football stadium in Al Thumama district in Doha, Qatar, located approximately 13 km (8.1 mi) south of the city center. It hosted the 2022 FIFA World Cup held in the country.

== Construction ==
The Al Thumama Stadium is one of eight stadiums, which have been built, renovated, or reconstructed for the FIFA World Cup in Qatar in 2022. It is located near Hamad International Airport. A joint venture between Al Jaber Engineering of Qatar and Tekfen Construction of Turkey is significantly involved in the construction work. The architectural design, by the Chief Architect of Arab Engineering Bureau Ibrahim Jaidah, takes its inspiration from the traditional taqiyah hat, a traditional cap which is worn by men and boys across the Middle East. A 50,000 m^{2} (540,000 sq ft) public park will surround the stadium. The stadium has a capacity of 40,000 seats. Following the World Cup, half of the stadium's seats will be removed and will be donated to other countries. It opened on 22 October 2021.

In October 2019, the Qatari government announced reforms that established a nondiscriminatory minimum wage for all migrant workers in the country and allowed them to change or leave their jobs without employer consent. However, other elements of the system that can leave employers with some control over their workers appeared to remain as of 2020. FIFA, as the governing body of the World Cup, took charge of matters relating to workers’ rights in the host nation and, upon being asked to comment, the organization wrote:

FIFA and its trusted partner, the Supreme Committee for Delivery and Legacy, have a zero-tolerance policy to any form of discrimination and to wage abuse. Through our work to protect the rights of FIFA World Cup workers in Qatar, FIFA and the Supreme Committee are aware of the importance of wage protection measures in the country and this is why we have put in place robust systems to prevent and mitigate wage abuse on FIFA World Cup sites, as well as mechanisms for workers to raise potential grievances and practices to provide for remediation where companies fail to live up to our standards.

== History ==
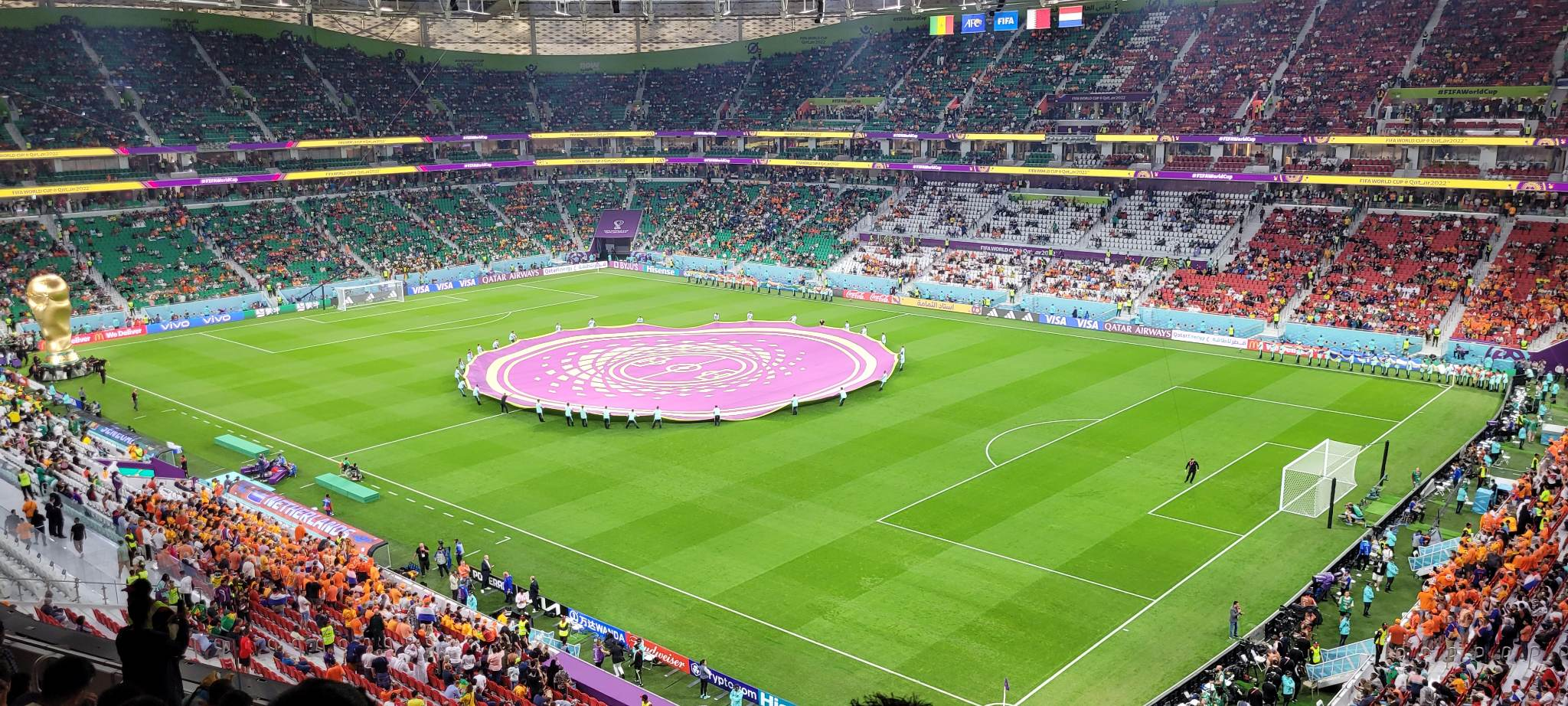
The stadium prior to the Senegal vs Netherlands match

The inauguration of the stadium took place on 22 October 2021, on the occasion of the Emir Cup Final.

In May 2018, the Al-Thumama Stadium was awarded the MIPIM/Architectural Review Future Project Award in the Sports and Stadiums category.

The stadium hosted six matches of the 2021 FIFA Arab Cup tournament, including a semi-final match between hosts Qatar and Algeria.

== Recent tournament results ==
=== 2021 FIFA Arab Cup ===
Matches held in Al Thumama Stadium for FAC 2021
| Date | Time | Team #1 | Result | Team #2 | Round | Attendance |
|---|---|---|---|---|---|---|
| 1 December 2021 | 16:00 | Egypt | 1–0 | Lebanon | Group D | 11,757 |
| 3 December 2021 | 13:00 | Bahrain | 0–0 | Iraq | Group A | 2,576 |
| 6 December 2021 | 18:00 | Tunisia | 1–0 | United Arab Emirates | Group B | 14,272 |
| 7 December 2021 | 18:00 | Morocco | 1–0 | Saudi Arabia | Group C | 8,502 |
| 11 December 2021 | 22:00 | Morocco | 2–2 (3–5 pen.) | Algeria | Quarterfinals | 24,823 |
| 15 December 2021 | 22:00 | Qatar | 1–2 | Algeria | Semifinals | 42,405 |

=== 2022 FIFA World Cup ===
The Al Thumama Stadium hosted eight matches during the 2022 FIFA World Cup.

Matches held in Al Thumama Stadium for FWC 2022
| Date | Time | Team No. 1 | Result | Team No. 2 | Round | Attendance |
|---|---|---|---|---|---|---|
| 21 November 2022 | 19:00 | Senegal | 0–2 | Netherlands | Group A | 41,721 |
| 23 November 2022 | 19:00 | Spain | 7–0 | Costa Rica | Group E | 40,013 |
| 25 November 2022 | 16:00 | Qatar | 1–3 | Senegal | Group A | 41,797 |
| 27 November 2022 | 16:00 | Belgium | 0–2 | Morocco | Group F | 43,738 |
| 29 November 2022 | 22:00 | Iran | 0–1 | United States | Group B | 42,127 |
| 1 December 2022 | 18:00 | Canada | 1–2 | Morocco | Group F | 43,102 |
| 4 December 2022 | 18:00 | France | 3–1 | Poland | Round of 16 | 40,989 |
| 10 December 2022 | 18:00 | Morocco | 1–0 | Portugal | Quarter-finals | 44,198 |

=== 2023 AFC Asian Cup ===
On 5 April 2023, the Al Thumama Stadium was chosen as one of eight (then nine) venues for the 2023 AFC Asian Cup. It hosted six matches.

| Date | Time | Team No. 1 | Result | Team No. 2 | Round | Attendance |
|---|---|---|---|---|---|---|
| 14 January 2024 | 14:30 | Japan | 4–2 | Vietnam | Group D | 17,385 |
| 17 January 2024 | 14:30 | Lebanon | 0–0 | China | Group A | 14,137 |
| 20 January 2024 | 14:30 | Jordan | 2–2 | South Korea | Group E | 36,627 |
| 24 January 2024 | 14:30 | Japan | 3–1 | Indonesia | Group D | 26,453 |
| 31 January 2024 | 14:30 | Bahrain | 1–3 | Japan | Round of 16 | 31,832 |
| 7 February 2024 | 18:00 | Iran | 2–3 | Qatar | Semi-finals | 40,342 |
