= Abdulla Yusuf Helal =

Bahraini footballer (born 1993)

Personal information
- Full name: Abdulla Yusuf Abdulrahim Mohamed Helal
- Date of birth: 12 June 1993 (age 33)
- Place of birth: Manama, Bahrain
- Height: 1.94 m (6 ft 4 in)
- Position: Forward

Youth career
- 2009–2014: East Riffa

Senior career*
Years	Team	Apps	(Gls)
2014–2017	East Riffa	28	(4)
2017–2018	Al-Muharraq	17	(3)
2018–2019	Bohemians 1905	15	(5)
2019–2022	Slavia Prague	25	(3)
2019	→ Bohemians 1905 (loan)	9	(0)
2020–2021	→ Slovan Liberec (loan)	9	(1)
2021–2022	→ Slovan Liberec (loan)	19	(3)
2022–2023	Persija Jakarta	17	(9)
2023–2024	Mladá Boleslav	33	(10)
2024–2026	Bohemians 1905	58	(10)
2026–	Al-Salmiya	0	(0)

International career^{‡}
2015	Bahrain U23	1	(0)
2012–2024	Bahrain	90	(14)
- * Club domestic league appearances and goals as of August 2026 ‡ National team caps and goals as of 14 November 2026

Abdulla Yusuf Abdulrahim Mohamed Helal (Arabic: عَبْد الله يُوسُف عَبْد الرَّحِيم مُحَمَّد هِلَال; born 12 June 1993) is a Bahraini professional footballer who plays as a forward for Kuwaiti club Al-Salmiya and the Bahrain national team.

== Personal life ==
Abdulla Yusuf Helal was born on 12 June 1993. He has a Czech wife.

== Club career ==
Helal played for East Riffa since 2009. Through this journey he joined Al-Muharraq SC on loan from his club. He won the Bahraini Premier League in the 2017–18 season with Al-Muharraq.

=== Czech First League ===
On 19 July 2018, it was announced that Helal would join Czech First League club Bohemians 1905 on loan and become the first Bahraini player to join a European top division club. On 28 July 2018, Helal played his first game with the club after coming on as a substitute in the 65th minute. He scored a goal and provided an assist in an eventual 4–2 loss at Příbram.

On 4 January 2019, Slavia Prague announced the signing of Helal from Bohemians 1905, and loaned him out for the rest of the season. On 17 September 2019, Helal entered the history again by being the first player from the GCC countries to participate in a 2019–20 UEFA Champions League match against Internazionale.

On 4 August 2020, Slavia loaned Helal to Slovan Liberec with two other players. 22 October 2020, he scored the only goal in a 1–0 win against Gent in the 2020–21 UEFA Europa League.

=== Indonesia and return to the Czech Republic ===
Helal officially joined the capital club Persija Jakarta on 20 July 2022. On 31 July 2022, he made his Liga 1 debut by substituted Hanif Sjahbandi in the 64th minute, in a 2–1 winning match against Persis at Patriot Candrabhaga Stadium.

On 28 June 2023, Helal signed with Mladá Boleslav one-year contract. Before the 2024–25 season, Helal returned to Bohemians 1905, where he started European part of his career.

== International career ==
He represents Bahrain national team since 2012. In his 100th appearances for the national team, he scored the winning goal against Jordan that sent Bahrain through to the round of 16 of the 2023 AFC Asian Cup at the top of Group E.

== Career statistics ==
=== Club ===
As of 16 February 2023

Appearances and goals by club, season and competition
Club	Season	League			Cup		Continental		Other		Total	
Club	Season	Division	Apps	Goals	Apps	Goals	Apps	Goals	Apps	Goals	Apps	Goals
Al-Muharraq	2017–18	Bahraini Premier League	17	3	0	0	0	0	0	0	17	3
Bohemians 1905	2018–19	Czech First League	15	5	3	0	—		—		18	5
Slavia Prague	2019–20	Czech First League	17	2	2	0	3	0	1	0	23	2
Slavia Prague	2020–21	Czech First League	8	1	1	0	—		—		9	1
Slavia Prague	Total		25	3	3	0	3	0	1	0	32	3
Bohemians 1905 (loan)	2018–19	Czech First League	9	0	2	0	—		—		11	0
Slovan Liberec (loan)	2020–21	Czech First League	9	1	0	0	8	3	—		17	4
Slovan Liberec (loan)	2021–22	Czech First League	19	3	0	0	—		—		19	3
Slovan Liberec (loan)	Total		28	4	2	0	8	3	0	0	36	7
Persija Jakarta	2022–23	Liga 1	17	9	0	0	—		—		17	9
Career total			111	24	8	0	11	3	1	0	131	27

=== International ===
As of matches played on 14 November 2026

Appearances and goals by national team and year
National team	Year	Apps	Goals
Bahrain	2012	9	0
Bahrain	2013	5	1
Bahrain	2014	7	0
Bahrain	2015	5	0
Bahrain	2016	6	1
Bahrain	2017	8	1
Bahrain	2018	8	2
Bahrain	2019	9	0
Bahrain	2021	3	0
Bahrain	2022	11	4
Bahrain	2023	10	2
Bahrain	2024	9	3
Total		90	14

Scores and results list Bahrain's goal tally first, score column indicates score after each Helal goal.

List of international goals scored by Abdulla Yusuf Helal
No.	Date	Venue	Opponent	Score	Result	Competition
1	18 January 2013	Bahrain National Stadium, Riffa, Bahrain	Kuwait	1–0	1–6	21st Arabian Gulf Cup
2	5 February 2016	Bahrain National Stadium, Riffa, Bahrain	Lebanon	2–0	2–0	Friendly
3	5 September 2017	Bahrain National Stadium, Riffa, Bahrain	Chinese Taipei	4–0	5–0	2019 AFC Asian Cup qualification
4	27 March 2018	Bahrain National Stadium, Riffa, Bahrain	Turkmenistan	1–0	4–0	2019 AFC Asian Cup qualification
5	27 March 2018	Bahrain National Stadium, Riffa, Bahrain	Turkmenistan	2–0	4–0	2019 AFC Asian Cup qualification
6	11 June 2022	Bukit Jalil National Stadium, Kuala Lumpur, Malaysia	Malaysia	2–1	2–1	2023 AFC Asian Cup qualification
7	14 June 2022	Bukit Jalil National Stadium, Kuala Lumpur, Malaysia	Turkmenistan	1–0	1–0	2023 AFC Asian Cup qualification
8	11 November 2022	Khalifa Sports City Stadium, Isa Town, Bahrain	Canada	2–1	2–2	Friendly
9	18 November 2022	Al Muharraq Stadium, Arad, Bahrain	Serbia	1–1	1–5	Friendly
10	10 January 2023	Al-Minaa Olympic Stadium, Basra, Iraq	Qatar	2–1	2–1	25th Arabian Gulf Cup
11	7 September 2023	Police Officers' Club Stadium, Dubai, United Arab Emirates	Kuwait	1–3	1–3	Friendly
12	25 January 2024	Khalifa International Stadium, Al Rayyan, Qatar	Jordan	1–0	1–0	2023 AFC Asian Cup
13	26 March 2024	Bahrain National Stadium, Riffa, Bahrain	Nepal	2–0	3–0	2026 FIFA World Cup qualification
14	14 November 2026	Zhaoqing New District Sports Center Stadium, Zhaoqing, China	Yemen	1–1	3–1	Friendly

== Honors ==
East Riffa

- Bahraini Second Division League: 2014
- Bahraini King's Cup: 2014
- Bahraini Super Cup: 2014

Al-Muharraq

- Bahraini Premier League: 2017–18

Slavia Prague

- Czech First League: 2019–20

Bahrain

- GCC U-23 Championship: 2013
