= Mohamed Adel (footballer, born 1996) =

Bahraini footballer

Personal information
- Full name: Mohamed Adel Mohamed Ali Hasan
- Place of birth: Bahrain
- Height: 1.80 m (5 ft 11 in)
- Position: Defender

Team information
- Current team: Al Khaldiya

Senior career*
| Years | Team | Apps | (Gls) |
| –2021 | Manama | | |
| 2021– | Al Khaldiya | | |

International career
| 2015– | Bahrain | 22 | (0) |
Medal record
Men's football
Representing Bahrain
Gulf Cup
| Winner | 2024 Kuwait |
- * Club domestic league appearances and goals

Mohamed Adel Mohamed Ali Hasan (Arabic: مُحَمَّد عَادِل مُحَمَّد عَلِيّ حَسَن; born 20 September 1996) is a Bahraini footballer who plays as a defender for Al Khaldiya.

== Career ==
=== Club career ===
Adel started his career with Bahraini side Manama, helping them win the 2016–17 Bahraini King's Cup, their first major trophy. In 2021, he signed for Al Khaldiya in Bahrain, helping them win the 2021–22 Bahraini King's Cup, their first major trophy.

=== International career ===
Adel represented Bahrain at the 2019 WAFF Championship and 24th Arabian Gulf Cup, helping them win both, their first WAFF Championship and Arabian Gulf Cup trophies.
