= Hazza Ali =

Bahraini professional footballer

Personal information
- Birth name: Hazza Ali Hazza Ateeq Mubarak
- Date of birth: June 9, 1995 (age 31)
- Place of birth: Riffa, Bahrain
- Height: 1.81 m (5 ft 11 1/2 in)
- Position: Left-back

Team information
- Current team: Al-Riffa SC

Senior career*
Years	Team	Apps	(Gls)
2013–2018	Al-Riffa		
2018–2019	Budaiya		
2019–2020	East Riffa Club		
2020–	Al-Riffa		

International career^{‡}
2021–	Bahrain	5	(0)
Medal record
Men's football
Representing Bahrain
Gulf Cup
Winner	2024 Kuwait
- * Club domestic league appearances and goals as of 06:15, 10 January 2024 (UTC) ‡ National team caps and goals as of 06:15, 10 January 2024 (UTC)

Hazza Ali Hazza Ateeq Mubarak (Arabic: هَزَّاع عَلِيّ هَزَّاع عَتِيق مُبَارَك; born 9 June 1995) is a Bahraini professional footballer who plays as a left-back for Al-Ahli Club, and the Bahrain national team.

== Career ==
Ali began his senior career in the Bahraini Premier League in 2017 with Al-Riffa. In 2018, he moved to Budaiya and the season after he transferred to East Riffa Clubon 27 May 2019. On 23 January 2020, he returned to Al-Riffa, and there helped them win 2 Bahraini Premier Leagues, the 2020–21 King's Cup and the 2021 Bahraini Super Cup.

== International ==
Ali debuted for the Bahrain national team in a 2–0 friendly win over Malaysia on 28 May 2021. He was called up to the national team for the 2023 AFC Asian Cup.

== Honours ==
Riffa

- Bahraini Premier League: 2020–21, 2021–22
- King's Cup: 2020–21
- Bahraini Super Cup: 2021
