= Jassim bin Hamad Stadium =

Association football stadium in Al Rayyan, Qatar

- ملعب جاسم بن حمد (Arabic)
- Interior view of the stadium
- Interactive map of Jassim bin Hamad Stadium
- Full name: Sheikh Jassim bin Hamad Stadium (ملعب الشيخ جاسم بن حمد)
- Location: Al Nadi St 7F8M+VMW; Fereej Al Soudan, Al Rayyan, Qatar
- Coordinates: 25°16′02″N 51°29′03″E
- Owner: Al-Sadd Sports Club
- Capacity: 15,000
- Surface: Grass
- Public transit: Al Sudan (السودان)

Construction
- Opened: 1975
- Renovated: 2004, 2010, 2025

Tenants
- Al-Sadd (1975–present); Qatar men's national team (1975–present); Qatar women's national team (2012–present)

Jassim bin Hamad Stadium (Arabic: ملعب جاسم بن حمد) is an association football stadium in Al Rayyan, Qatar, located in the Fereej Al Soudan district, about 5 kilometres (3 miles) west from the centre of Doha. It is the home of the Al Sadd Sports Club's association football team, who play in the top-flight Qatar Stars League, and is occasionally used by the Qatar men's and women's national football teams as one of their home grounds. Named after the then-Qatari Minister of Youth and Sports Jassim bin Hamad bin Abdullah Al Thani, who had provided permission for Al Sadd's founding members to form the group in 1969, the stadium was opened in 1975, and has since been renovated three times; once for the 17th Arabian Gulf Cup in 2004, again 2010, and in 2025. In addition to hosting all matches of the Arabian Gulf Cup in 2004, the stadium has hosted numerous international association football matches throughout its history, including matches of the 2019 FIFA Club World Cup, the football tournaments at the 2006 Asian Games and 2011 Pan Arab Games, and two editions of the Italian super cup, the Supercoppa Italiana.

== Facilities ==
Aside from the main field, the Jassim Bin Hamad Stadium area also accommodates an administration office, a cafe, a mosque, workers' quarters, an athletics track, training fields, a swimming pool and a multi-sports hall. The multi-sports hall has a capacity of 1,000 people, and is used for local tournaments in basketball, volleyball, handball and other sports and events.

== Design ==
Jassim bin Hamad Stadium has approximately 12,946 seats. The design incorporates both modern and traditional Qatari architectural elements, with an exterior inspired by the sails of traditional dhow boats. The stadium has a retractable roof to allow climate control during events. Facilities include broadcast and media spaces, VIP lounges, and changing rooms. The stadium serves as a landmark in the Al Sadd area of Doha.

== History ==
=== 17th Arabian Gulf Cup ===
The Arabian Gulf Cup final match was played on this stadium in December 2014 where Qatar defeated Oman on penalties and won the title. The final ceremony of the cup was held in Jassim bin Hamad stadium.

=== 2006 Asian Games ===
The final of the football tournament of the Games was held there when Qatar defeated Iraq by one goal and won the title. Furthermore, waterpolo, sepak takraw and cue sports took place here during the tournament.

=== Qatar Stars League ===
As this is Al Sadd's home stadium they play their home league matches there and in the 2009–2010 season it was shared with the other Qatari side Al Ahli. And whenever Al Sadd scores a goal a sound of a wolf howling comes out of the stadium's speakers because the clubs nick or mascot is the wolf.

=== Qatar national football team ===
The Qatari football team plays its important matches there such as the World Cup qualifiers matches there.

=== Qatar Heir Apparent's Cup ===
All the matches of this cup are played on the same stadium because this cup is only made up of two semi-finals and a final match.

=== Qatar's Emir Cup ===
The semi-final matches are played on these stadiums while the quarter-final matches and round of sixteen matches are played in the Grand Hamad Stadium and the final match is played in the Khalifa Stadium.

=== 2014 Supercoppa Italiana ===
The Stadium hosted the 2014 Supercoppa Italiana in a match involving Juventus (Serie A champions) and Napoli (Coppa Italia champions). The Stadium hosted the 2016 Supercoppa Italiana in a match involving Juventus (Serie A champions) and Milan (Coppa Italia runner-up).

=== 2019 FIFA Club World Cup ===
The Jassim bin Hamad Stadium hosted three matches during the 2019 FIFA Club World Cup.

=== 2022 FIFA World Cup ===
During the 2022 FIFA World Cup, France used the stadium as their training base.

=== Equality Cup ===
In 2024, it hosted the first installment of the Equality Cup, a friendly tournament with international clubs.

=== 2024 AFC U-23 Asian Cup ===
The stadium hosted the 2024 AFC U-23 Asian Cup.

== Recent tournament results ==
=== 2019 FIFA Club World Cup ===
Date	Time (QST)	Team #1	Result	Team #2	Round	Attendance
11 December 2019	20:30	(Qatar) Al-Sadd	3–1	(New Caledonia) Hienghène Sport	First round	7,047
14 December 2019	17:00	(Saudi Arabia) Al Hilal	1–0	(Tunisia) ES Tunis	Second round	7,726
14 December 2019	20:30	(Mexico) Monterrey	3–2	(Qatar) Al-Sadd	Second round	4,878

=== 2023 AFC Asian Cup ===
On 5 April 2023, the Jassim bin Hamad Stadium was chosen one of eight (then nine) venues for the 2023 AFC Asian Cup. It hosted seven matches.

Date	Time	Team No. 1	Result	Team No. 2	Round	Attendance
13 January 2024	20:30	Uzbekistan	0–0	Syria	Group B	10,198
15 January 2024	14:30	South Korea	3–1	Bahrain	Group E	8,388
18 January 2024	14:30	Syria	0–1	Australia	Group B	10,097
20 January 2024	17:30	Bahrain	1–0	Malaysia	Group E	10,386
22 January 2024	18:00	Tajikistan	2–1	Lebanon	Group A	11,843
24 January 2024	14:30	Iraq	3–2	Vietnam	Group D	8,932
28 January 2024	14:30	Australia	4–0	Indonesia	Round of 16	7,863

== See also ==
- Lists of stadiums

Events and tenants
Preceded by Busan Asiad Main Stadium; Busan	Asian Games Football tournament Final Venue; 2006	Succeeded by Tianhe Stadium; Guangzhou
