= Fu Ming =

Chinese football referee (born 1983)

- Full name: Fu Ming
- Born: 5 January 1983 (age 43); Huai'an, China
- Other occupation: Professor

Domestic
Years	League	Role
2010–2024	Chinese Super League	Referee
2025–	J League	Referee

International
Years	League	Role
2014–	FIFA listed	Referee

Fu Ming
- Chinese: 傅明
Transcriptions
Standard Mandarin
- Hanyu Pinyin: Fù Míng
- IPA: [fû mǐŋ]

Fu Ming (simplified Chinese: 傅明; pinyin: Fù Míng; born 5 January 1983) is a Chinese football referee. He has been a full international referee for FIFA since 2014. He is a teacher of Jincheng College of Nanjing University of Aeronautics and Astronautics. Since 2025, he resides in Japan as a doctorate student at Waseda University's Graduate School of Sport Sciences while continuing to officiate both in the J.League and in international tournaments.

On 23 February 2019, it was announced that Fu Ming had been hired by CFA to become one of the professional referees in China.

== AFC Asian Cup 2019 ==
2019 AFC Asian Cup – United Arab Emirates
Date	Match	Venue	Round
12 January 2019	Yemen – Iraq	Sharjah	Group stage
21 January 2019	United Arab Emirates – Kyrgyzstan	Abu Dhabi	Round of 16

== Controversial decisions ==
In the early hours of August 23, 2023, Beijing time, Al Nassr, led by Cristiano Ronaldo, secured their spot in the AFC Champions League group stage by defeating Shabab Al Ahli Club with a score of 4-2 in the playoff. Throughout the match, there were controversies surrounding the decisions made by the Chinese referee, Fu Ming. In the first half of the game, the score was tied at 1-1. Ronaldo fell three times in the penalty area, yet the referee did not award any penalties. Additionally, there was a situation where Ronaldo's hooked shot led to a suspected handball by the opposition, but Fu Ming did not signal for it. Furthermore, Al Nassr's Senegalese forward, Sadio Mané, was also brought down multiple times by the opponents, but Fu Ming did not make any rulings. After the match, the referee's performance of Fu Ming sparked widespread questioning and criticism from the fans.

On March 9, 2019, in the second round of the Chinese Super League, Shandong Luneng drew 2-2 with Henan Jianye at home. During the match, Fu Ming's multiple refereeing decisions sparked controversy. After the game, Shandong Luneng, in conjunction with the Shandong Football Association, lodged a complaint about the referee's decisions and pointed out four contentious rulings made by Fu Ming during the match. Starting from the 70th minute of this match, Fu Ming's four decisions caused significant controversy. Shandong Luneng Taishan's official statement in the complaint explicitly outlined these four disputed incidents. After the match, angered Shandong Luneng fans conducted an investigation into Fu Ming's academic paper and discovered potential plagiarism suspicions.
