= 2023 AFC Asian Cup knockout stage =

The knockout stage of the 2023 AFC Asian Cup was the second and final stage of the competition, following the group stage. It began on 28 January with the round of 16 and ended on 10 February with the final match, held at the Lusail Stadium in Lusail. A total of 16 teams (the top two teams from each group, along with the four best third-placed teams) advanced to the knockout stage to compete in a single-elimination style tournament.

All times are local, AST (UTC+3).

== Format ==
In the knockout stage, if a match was level at the end of 90 minutes of normal playing time, extra time was played (two periods of 15 minutes each). If still tied after extra time, the match was decided by a penalty shoot-out to determine the winner. This was the second time there was no third place play-off, after the 2019 edition.

The AFC set out the following schedule for the round of 16:

- R16-1: Group A runners-up v Group C runners-up
- R16-2: Group D winners v Group B/E/F third place
- R16-3: Group B winners v Group A/C/D third place
- R16-4: Group F winners v Group E runners-up
- R16-5: Group C winners v Group A/B/F third place
- R16-6: Group E winners v Group D runners-up
- R16-7: Group A winners v Group C/D/E third place
- R16-8: Group B runners-up v Group F runners-up

=== Combinations of matches in the round of 16 ===
The specific match-ups involving the third-placed teams depended on which four third-placed teams qualified for the round of 16:

Combination according to the four qualified teams

Third-placed teams qualify from groups						1A vs	1B vs	1C vs	1D vs
A	B	C	D			3C	3D	3A	3B
A	B	C		E		3C	3A	3B	3E
A	B	C			F	3C	3A	3B	3F
A	B		D	E		3D	3A	3B	3E
A	B		D		F	3D	3A	3B	3F
A	B			E	F	3E	3A	3B	3F
A		C	D	E		3C	3D	3A	3E
A		C	D		F	3C	3D	3A	3F
A		C		E	F	3C	3A	3F	3E
A			D	E	F	3D	3A	3F	3E
	B	C	D	E		3C	3D	3B	3E
	B	C	D		F	3C	3D	3B	3F
	B	C		E	F	3E	3C	3B	3F
	B		D	E	F	3E	3D	3B	3F
		C	D	E	F	3C	3D	3F	3E

== Qualified teams ==
The top two placed teams from each of the six groups, plus the four best-placed third teams, qualified for the knockout stage.

Group	Winners	Runners-up	Third-placed teams (Best four qualified)
A	Qatar	Tajikistan	—N/a
B	Australia	Uzbekistan	Syria
C	Iran	United Arab Emirates	Palestine
D	Iraq	Japan	Indonesia
E	Bahrain	South Korea	Jordan
F	Saudi Arabia	Thailand	—N/a

Indonesia, Palestine, Syria, and Tajikistan made their knockout stage debut in this tournament.

== Bracket ==
Round of 16
28 January – Al Rayyan (ABAS)
Tajikistan (p)	1 (5)
United Arab Emirates	1 (3)
29 January – Al Rayyan (KIS)
Iraq	2
Jordan	3
28 January – Al Rayyan (JBHS)
Australia	4
Indonesia	0
30 January – Al Rayyan (ECS)
Saudi Arabia	1 (2)
South Korea (p)	1 (4)
31 January – Doha (ABKS)
Iran (p)	1 (5)
Syria	1 (3)
31 January – Doha (ATS)
Bahrain	1
Japan	3
29 January – Al Khor
Qatar	2
Palestine	1
30 January – Al Wakrah
Uzbekistan	2
Thailand	1

Quarter-finals
2 February – Al Rayyan (ABAS)
Tajikistan	0
Jordan	1
2 February – Al Wakrah
Australia	1
South Korea (a.e.t.)	2
3 February – Al Rayyan (ECS)
Iran	2
Japan	1
3 February – Al Khor
Qatar (p)	1 (3)
Uzbekistan	1 (2)

Semi-finals
6 February – Al Rayyan (ABAS)
Jordan	2
South Korea	0
7 February – Doha (ATS)
Iran	2
Qatar	3

Final
10 February – Lusail
Jordan	1
Qatar	3

All times are local, AST (UTC+3).

== Round of 16 ==
=== Australia vs Indonesia ===
This was the first time Australia and Indonesia faced each other at the Asian Cup, having last met back in 2010 during the 2011 AFC Asian Cup qualification, in which Australia triumphed. This fixture was also the first time Australia faced a fellow AFF member in the Asian Cup since becoming AFF member in 2013. It was also the first time since 2007 (4–0 win against Thailand) that Australia faced a Southeast Asian opponent.

Indonesia quickly applied pressure in the first minutes trying to exploit Australia's organisation, but, although Indonesia pressed early, they were brutally punished in the 12th minute when Jackson Irvine produced a run that saw him overcome three Indonesian players before his shot caused Elkan Baggott to unintentionally deflect the ball into his own net to give Australia the lead. Australia scored once again when, from a counterattack, the ball was delivered high by Gethin Jones from Indonesia's left flank and Martin Boyle quickly headed home for the second. Although Australia reduced the tempo in the second half and allowed Indonesia more space, the Indonesians failed to score, and they were again punished in the 89th minute from another run on the left flank. Nathaniel Atkinson's cut piece was followed by Irvine's header; although Ernando Ari managed to save the initial shot, he could not prevent Craig Goodwin from scoring after the save deflected and allowed Goodwin's volley. Australia completed the game in style in the first minute of added time when Harry Souttar capitalised from a set-piece by Goodwin to head home.

Since joining the AFC in 2006, Australia had never lost against fellow AFF members, which was later extended following their win over Indonesia (10 wins, three draws). This result equalled Australia's second biggest win in their AFC Asian Cup history, all 4–0, which happened against Thailand in 2007, India in 2011 and Oman in 2015. This also secured Australia's ongoing streak of advancing to every quarter-finals of the Asian Cup since their debut in 2007.

28 January 2024
14:30

Australia	4–0	Indonesia
Baggott 12' (o.g.); Boyle 45'; Goodwin 89'; Souttar 90+1'	Report

Jassim bin Hamad Stadium, Al Rayyan
Attendance: 7,863
Referee: Mohammed Abdulla Hassan Mohamed (United Arab Emirates)

Australia	Indonesia

GK	1	Mathew Ryan (c)
RB	25	Gethin Jones	(yellow card) 65'	(substituted off) 69'
CB	19	Harry Souttar
CB	4	Kye Rowles
LB	16	Aziz Behich
DM	17	Keanu Baccus		(substituted off) 87'
CM	14	Riley McGree		(substituted off) 61'
CM	22	Jackson Irvine
RF	6	Martin Boyle
CF	9	Bruno Fornaroli	(yellow card) 15'	(substituted off) 61'
LF	5	Jordan Bos		(substituted off) 87'
Substitutions:
MF	8	Connor Metcalfe		(substituted on) 61'
FW	15	Mitchell Duke		(substituted on) 61'
DF	3	Nathaniel Atkinson		(substituted on) 69'
MF	13	Aiden O'Neill		(substituted on) 87'
FW	23	Craig Goodwin		(substituted on) 87'
Manager:
Graham Arnold

GK	21	Ernando Ari
CB	6	Sandy Walsh	(yellow card) 68'
CB	4	Jordi Amat	(yellow card) 90'
CB	3	Elkan Baggott
RM	14	Asnawi Mangkualam (c)	(yellow card) 35'	(substituted off) 58'
CM	25	Justin Hubner
CM	24	Ivar Jenner
LM	20	Shayne Pattynama
RF	2	Yakob Sayuri		(substituted off) 75'
CF	11	Rafael Struick	(yellow card) 90+4'
LF	7	Marselino Ferdinan
Substitutions:
MF	8	Witan Sulaeman		(substituted on) 58'
DF	5	Rizky Ridho		(substituted on) 75'
Manager:
(South Korea) Shin Tae-yong

Man of the Match:
Martin Boyle (Australia)

Assistant referees:
Mohamed Al-Hammadi (United Arab Emirates)
Hasan Al-Mahri (United Arab Emirates)
Fourth official:
Abdullah Jamali (Kuwait)
Reserve assistant referee:
Ahmad Abbas (Kuwait)
Video assistant referee:
Omar Al-Ali (United Arab Emirates)
Assistant video assistant referees:
Adel Al-Naqbi (United Arab Emirates)

=== Tajikistan vs United Arab Emirates ===
This was the teams' first ever competitive meeting; having met just twice, both in friendlies, in which the United Arab Emirates won one and drew one.

Despite the Emiratis controlling the match in the first minutes, it was Tajikistan who scored first after Vahdat Hanonov, assisted by Zoir Dzhuraboyev, headed into the net over two Emirati players. The Tajiks then put up an effective defence to neutralise Emirati attacks for the majority of the game, until the fifth minute of second half's added time when, from a set-piece by Ali Saleh, Khalifa Al Hammadi produced a header to equalise for the United Arab Emirates at. Both teams played conservatively through extra time, forcing a penalty shootout. Tajikistan successfully converted all five of their penalties, as Caio Canedo's second shot for the United Arab Emirates was denied by Rustam Yatimov and Tajikistan sealed a historic win.

Tajikistan became the first Asian Cup knockout stage debutant to win a knockout stage game since Japan in 1992. The loss resulted in the worst performance for the United Arab Emirates in the Asian Cup since 2011, when they were eliminated in the group stage.

28 January 2024
19:00

Tajikistan	1–1 (a.e.t.)	United Arab Emirates
Hanonov 30'	Report	Al Hammadi 90+5'
Penalties
Nazarov (penalty scored); Hanonov (penalty scored); Panjshanbe (penalty scored); Soirov (penalty scored); Shukurov (penalty scored)	5–3	(penalty scored) Idrees; (penalty missed) Caio; (penalty scored) Lima; (penalty scored) Saleh

Ahmad bin Ali Stadium, Al Rayyan
Attendance: 33,584
Referee: Yusuke Araki (Japan)

Tajikistan	United Arab Emirates

GK	1	Rustam Yatimov
RB	5	Manuchekhr Safarov
CB	6	Vahdat Hanonov
CB	2	Zoir Dzhuraboyev
LB	19	Akhtam Nazarov (c)
RM	15	Shervoni Mabatshoev		(substituted off) 85'
CM	7	Parvizdzhon Umarbayev		(substituted off) 85'
CM	14	Alisher Shukurov
LM	17	Ehson Panjshanbe
CF	22	Shahrom Samiev		(substituted off) 72'
CF	10	Alisher Dzhalilov		(substituted off) 72'
Substitutions:
FW	9	Rustam Soirov		(substituted on) 72'
FW	25	Nuriddin Khamrokulov	(yellow card) 116'	(substituted on) 72'
DF	3	Tabrezi Islomov		(substituted on) 85'
MF	11	Mukhammadzhon Rakhimov		(substituted on) 85'
Manager:
(Croatia) Petar Šegrt

GK	17	Khalid Eisa (c)
RB	3	Zayed Sultan		(substituted off) 61'
CB	4	Khalid Al-Hashemi		(substituted off) 46'
CB	12	Khalifa Al Hammadi
LB	26	Bader Nasser
DM	15	Yahia Nader		(substituted off) 73'
CM	8	Tahnoon Al-Zaabi	(yellow card) 84'	(substituted off) 90'
CM	18	Abdullah Ramadan		(substituted off) 16'
RF	10	Fábio Lima
CF	11	Caio Canedo
LF	20	Yahya Al-Ghassani	(yellow card) 69'
Substitutions:
MF	14	Abdulla Hamad		(substituted on) 16' (substituted off) 61'
DF	2	Abdulla Idrees		(substituted on) 46'
FW	9	Ali Saleh		(substituted on) 61'
DF	19	Khaled Ibrahim		(substituted on) 61'
MF	6	Majid Rashid		(substituted on) 73'
MF	5	Ali Salmeen		(substituted on) 90'
Manager:
(Portugal) Paulo Bento

Man of the Match:
Shahrom Samiev (Tajikistan)

Assistant referees:
Jun Mihara (Japan)
Takumi Takagi (Japan)
Fourth official:
Mohammed Al Hoish (Saudi Arabia)
Reserve assistant referee:
Yasir Al-Sultan (Saudi Arabia)
Video assistant referee:
Jumpei Iida (Japan)
Assistant video assistant referees:
Sivakorn Pu-udom (Thailand)

=== Iraq vs Jordan ===
This match was the two neighbouring rivals' second Asian Cup meeting in history, with their only encounter dating back to 2015, also their most recent competitive encounter, which Iraq triumphed in a hard-fought match.

Iraq made a bright start, but after just the first ten minutes, Jordan reclaimed control. The Jordanians scored first when, from a misjudged pass by Amir Al-Ammari, Yazan Al-Naimat intercepted the ball in the midfield and sprinted to face Jalal Hassan before bouncing the ball up into the net in the first minute of added time of the first half. Saad Natiq equalised for Iraq from a corner kick in the 68th minute with a header too hard for Yazid Abu Layla to deny. Iraq took the lead in the 76th minute when, from a left flank cross by Merchas Doski, combined with a misjudged header by Yazan Al-Arab, Aymen Hussein delivered a low shot to the right bottom corner of the net. However, Hussein's celebration resulted in his controversial dismissal right after scoring. Jordan equallised in the fifth minute of added time: when a chaotic ball fight in the Iraqi penalty area followed a Jordanian corner kick; Musa Al-Taamari curled the ball towards the net and was denied initially by Jalal Hassan, but Al-Arab soon quickly rebounded the ball home. As the match was heading towards extra time, a Jordanian siege followed and the ball was passed to Nizar Al-Rashdan from Al-Taamari, who then hit a long-range effort that proved to be the final goal of the game as Jordan sealed a historic victory.

This result meant Iraq had failed to advance past the round of 16 for the second time in a row. Meanwhile, this was the first time ever Jordan came out victorious in a knockout stage match in Asian Cup history. Iraq's loss to Jordan was also a shock in the competition, given Iraq's dominant performance in Group D, including a famous 2–1 win over powerhouse and four-time champions Japan.

29 January 2024
14:30

Iraq	2–3	Jordan
Natiq 68'; Hussein 76'	Report	Al-Naimat 45+1'; Al-Arab 90+5'; Al-Rashdan 90+7'

Khalifa International Stadium, Al Rayyan
Attendance: 35,814
Referee: Alireza Faghani (Australia)

Iraq	Jordan

GK	12	Jalal Hassan (c)
RB	3	Hussein Ali
CB	4	Saad Natiq		(substituted off) 72'
CB	2	Rebin Sulaka
LB	25	Ahmed Yahya		(substituted off) 54'
CM	20	Osama Rashid		(substituted off) 63'
CM	16	Amir Al-Ammari
RW	8	Ibrahim Bayesh
AM	17	Ali Jasim
LW	7	Youssef Amyn		(substituted off) 54'
CF	18	Aymen Hussein	(yellow card) 45+3' (yellow-red card) 77'
Substitutions:
DF	23	Merchas Doski		(substituted on) 54'
MF	11	Zidane Iqbal		(substituted on) 54'
FW	10	Mohanad Ali		(substituted on) 63'
DF	6	Ali Adnan		(substituted on) 72'
Manager:
(Spain) Jesús Casas

GK	1	Yazid Abu Layla
CB	3	Abdallah Nasib	(yellow card) 14'
CB	5	Yazan Al-Arab
CB	17	Salem Al-Ajalin
RM	23	Ihsan Haddad (c)
CM	21	Nizar Al-Rashdan	(yellow card) 90+8'
CM	14	Rajaei Ayed		(substituted off) 90'
LM	13	Mahmoud Al-Mardi
RF	10	Musa Al-Taamari
CF	11	Yazan Al-Naimat	(yellow card) 80'
LF	9	Ali Olwan
Substitutions:
MF	18	Saleh Rateb		(substituted on) 90'
Other disciplinary actions:
FW	20	Hamza Al-Dardour	(red card) 90+6'
Manager:
(Morocco) Hussein Ammouta

Man of the Match:
Nizar Al-Rashdan (Jordan)

Assistant referees:
Anton Shchetinin (Australia)
Ashley Beecham (Australia)
Fourth official:
Abdulrahman Al-Jassim (Qatar)
Reserve assistant referee:
Saoud Al-Maqaleh (Qatar)
Video assistant referee:
Khamis Al-Marri (Qatar)
Assistant video assistant referees:
Salman Ahmad Falahi (Qatar)

=== Qatar vs Palestine ===
This match was the first time the two teams had faced each other in an Asian Cup, with their most recent competitive fixtures happening during the 2004 AFC Asian Cup qualification, with Qatar winning one and one draw.

Although Qatar were the stronger team on paper, Palestine forced Qatar to work hard at the first minutes. Palestine scored first in the 37th minute when a pass by Bassam Al-Rawi from midfield was intercepted by Oday Dabbagh, who then overcame two remaining Qatari defenders and shot low beyond Meshaal Barsham. Qatar levelled just before the end of the first half with a corner kick by Akram Afif to Hassan Al-Haydos, who then took a deflected shot to hit home in the sixth minute of added time. Palestine conceded a penalty early in the second half, as Mohammed Saleh foulled Almoez Ali in the box in the 47th minute, before Afif converted from the spot to secure Qatar's win.

29 January 2024
19:00

Qatar	2–1	Palestine
Al-Haydos 45+6'; Afif 49' (pen.)	Report	Dabbagh 37'

Al Bayt Stadium, Al Khor
Attendance: 63,753
Referee: Ma Ning (China)

Qatar	Palestine

GK	22	Meshaal Barsham
CB	15	Bassam Al-Rawi	(substituted off) 46'
CB	16	Boualem Khoukhi	(substituted off) 46'
CB	12	Lucas Mendes
RM	2	Ró-Ró
CM	24	Jassem Gaber	(substituted off) 89'
CM	20	Ahmed Fatehi
CM	10	Hassan Al-Haydos (c)	(substituted off) 59'
LM	4	Mohammed Waad
CF	19	Almoez Ali
CF	11	Akram Afif
Substitutions:
DF	5	Tarek Salman	(substituted on) 46'
FW	25	Ahmed Al Ganehi	(substituted on) 46'
MF	6	Abdulaziz Hatem	(substituted on) 59'
DF	3	Al-Mahdi Ali Mukhtar	(substituted on) 89'
Manager:
(Spain) Tintín Márquez

GK	22	Rami Hamadeh
RB	7	Musab Al-Battat (c)
CB	15	Michel Termanini
CB	5	Mohammed Saleh	(yellow card) 48'
LB	12	Camilo Saldaña
RM	9	Tamer Seyam	(yellow card) 15'	(substituted off) 58'
CM	6	Oday Kharoub		(substituted off) 75'
CM	18	Amid Mahajna	(yellow card) 85'
LM	10	Mahmoud Abu Warda
CF	11	Oday Dabbagh
CF	20	Zaid Qunbar		(substituted off) 83'
Substitutions:
MF	21	Islam Batran		(substituted on) 58'
MF	3	Mohammed Rashid		(substituted on) 75'
FW	13	Shehab Qunbar		(substituted on) 83'
Manager:
(Tunisia) Makram Daboub

Man of the Match:
Akram Afif (Qatar)

Assistant referees:
Zhou Fei (China)
Zhang Cheng (China)
Fourth official:
Ahmad Al-Ali (Kuwait)
Reserve assistant referee:
Abdulhadi Al-Anezi (Kuwait)
Video assistant referee:
Fu Ming (China)
Assistant video assistant referees:
Muhammad Taqi (Singapore)

=== Uzbekistan vs Thailand ===
This match was the first ever meeting in an Asian Cup between Uzbekistan and Thailand. In their most recent competitive meeting, which happened in the earlier tournament's qualification, Uzbekistan claimed the win.

Uzbekistan started strongly and scored first in the 37th minute, when from a delivery from Diyor Kholmatov, Azizbek Turgunboev volleyed home to give the Uzbeks the lead. Thailand responded in a rare attacking opportunity as the Uzbeks lowered the tempo in the second half, when Theerathon Bunmathan intercepted a throw-in by the Uzbeks and passed to Supachok Sarachat, who then dribbled past several of Uzbek players before passing to Supachai Chaided, who curled the ball into the net to equalise in the 58th minute. Just seven minutes after Thailand equalised, Uzbekistan retook the lead from an attack on Thailand's right flank; the ball was given to Jaloliddin Masharipov, whose cut-piece to Abbosbek Fayzullaev allowed him to take a difficult shot into the right corner, giving Thai goalkeeper Patiwat Khammai no chance to respond.

With this result, Uzbekistan won their first Asian Cup knockout stage game since 2011, which was also hosted by Qatar, while Thailand remained winless in their Asian Cup knockout stage fixtures. In personal record, this match was the first time Srečko Katanec managed to win a knockout stage game in any competitive tournament, having failed to do so as coach of Slovenia, the United Arab Emirates, and Iraq.

30 January 2024
14:30

Uzbekistan	2–1	Thailand
Turgunboev 37'; Fayzullaev 65'	Report	Supachok 58'

Al Janoub Stadium, Al Wakrah
Attendance: 18,691
Referee: Nazmi Nasaruddin (Malaysia)

Uzbekistan	Thailand

GK	1	Utkir Yusupov
CB	25	Abdukodir Khusanov	(yellow card) 87'
CB	15	Umar Eshmurodov
CB	5	Rustam Ashurmatov
RM	19	Azizbek Turgunboev		(substituted off) 81'
CM	9	Odiljon Hamrobekov
CM	6	Diyor Kholmatov
LM	4	Farrukh Sayfiev
RF	11	Oston Urunov		(substituted off) 67'
CF	10	Jaloliddin Masharipov (c)		(substituted off) 82'
LF	22	Abbosbek Fayzullaev		(substituted off) 90+1'
Substitutions:
MF	20	Khojimat Erkinov		(substituted on) 67'
DF	26	Zafarmurod Abdurakhmatov		(substituted on) 81'
MF	8	Jamshid Iskanderov		(substituted on) 82'
MF	14	Jamshid Boltaboev		(substituted on) 90+1'
Manager:
(Slovenia) Srečko Katanec

GK	23	Patiwat Khammai
RB	12	Nicholas Mickelson
CB	4	Elias Dolah
CB	17	Pansa Hemviboon
LB	3	Theerathon Bunmathan (c)
CM	6	Sarach Yooyen	(substituted off) 82'
CM	18	Weerathep Pomphan	(substituted off) 82'
RW	14	Rungrath Poomchantuek	(substituted off) 73'
AM	24	Worachit Kanitsribampen	(substituted off) 46'
LW	19	Pathompol Charoenrattanapirom	(substituted off) 46'
CF	9	Supachai Chaided
Substitutions:
FW	10	Suphanat Mueanta	(substituted on) 46'
MF	7	Supachok Sarachat	(substituted on) 46'
MF	22	Channarong Promsrikaew	(substituted on) 73'
MF	25	Peeradon Chamratsamee	(substituted on) 82'
MF	8	Picha Autra	(substituted on) 82'
Manager:
(Japan) Masatada Ishii

Man of the Match:
Jaloliddin Masharipov (Uzbekistan)

Assistant referees:
Mohamad Zairul Bin Khalil Tan (Malaysia)
Mohd Arif Shamil Bin Abd Rasid (Malaysia)
Fourth official:
Ahmed Al-Kaf (Oman)
Reserve assistant referee:
Abu Bakar Al-Amri (Oman)
Video assistant referee:
Omar Al-Ali (United Arab Emirates)
Assistant video assistant referees:
Khalid Al-Turais (Saudi Arabia)

=== Saudi Arabia vs South Korea ===
The two teams faced off in their first match together at the Asian Cup since 2007, when both teams were held to a 1–1 draw; while their most recent competitive meetings dated back to the 2010 FIFA World Cup qualification, where South Korea won 2–0 on aggregate. In personal records, this marked the first time Roberto Mancini and Jürgen Klinsmann faced each other as coaches in a competitive tournament, having met as players in the opening game of the UEFA Euro 1988 between West Germany and Italy, which also ended in a 1–1 draw, in which Mancini scored the opening goal of the match for Italy.

After a goalless first half, Saudi Arabia scored first when Salem Al-Dawsari's pass allowed Abdullah Radif to make a deep run through the South Korean defence before hitting home at the left of the net to give Saudi Arabia the lead in the first minute of second half. The South Koreans scored a late goal to equalise when from Son Heung-min's long pass, Kim Tae-hwan passed to Seol Young-woo, whose header was received by Cho Gue-sung. Cho scored for South Korea in the ninth minute of injury time. Neither Saudi Arabia or South Korea were able to score again in added time, forcing the game to go to penalties. South Korean goalkeeper Jo Hyeon-woo turned hero for his team with two saves against Sami Al-Najei and Abdulrahman Ghareeb, while his South Korean teammates converted all of their penalties to secure South Korea's progression to the quarter-finals.

This marked South Korea's first triumph over Saudi Arabia in the Asian Cup. Meanwhile, Saudi Arabia failed to win a knockout stage game since 2007, the last time they reached the final.

30 January 2024
19:00

Saudi Arabia	1–1 (a.e.t.)	South Korea
Radif 46'	Report	Cho Gue-sung 90+9'
Penalties
Kanno (penalty scored); Abdulhamid (penalty scored); Al-Najei (penalty missed); Ghareeb (penalty missed)	2–4	(penalty scored) Son Heung-min; (penalty scored) Kim Young-gwon; (penalty scored) Cho Gue-sung; (penalty scored) Hwang Hee-chan

Education City Stadium, Al Rayyan
Attendance: 42,389
Referee: Ilgiz Tantashev (Uzbekistan)

Saudi Arabia	South Korea

GK	22	Ahmed Al-Kassar	(yellow card) 90+5'
CB	17	Hassan Al-Tambakti		(substituted off) 108'
CB	4	Ali Lajami
CB	5	Ali Al-Bulaihi
RM	12	Saud Abdulhamid
CM	23	Mohamed Kanno
CM	15	Abdullah Al-Khaibari		(substituted off) 105'
CM	24	Nasser Al-Dawsari		(substituted off) 72'
LM	25	Mohammed Al-Breik	(yellow card) 120+1'	(substituted off) 89'
CF	11	Saleh Al-Shehri		(substituted off) 46'
CF	10	Salem Al-Dawsari (c)		(substituted off) 84'
Substitutions:
FW	20	Abdullah Radif		(substituted on) 46'
MF	6	Eid Al-Muwallad	(yellow card) 113'	(substituted on) 72'
MF	18	Abdulrahman Ghareeb		(substituted on) 84'
DF	13	Hassan Kadesh		(substituted on) 89'
DF	3	Awn Al-Saluli		(substituted on) 105'
MF	16	Sami Al-Najei		(substituted on) 108'
Manager:
(Italy) Roberto Mancini

GK	21	Jo Hyeon-woo
CB	15	Jung Seung-hyun		(substituted off) 64'
CB	4	Kim Min-jae		(substituted off) 117'
CB	19	Kim Young-gwon	(yellow card) 49'
RM	23	Kim Tae-hwan
CM	10	Lee Jae-sung		(substituted off) 64'
CM	6	Hwang In-beom		(substituted off) 104'
LM	22	Seol Young-woo
RF	18	Lee Kang-in	(yellow card) 114'
CF	7	Son Heung-min (c)
LF	17	Jeong Woo-yeong		(substituted off) 54'
Substitutions:
FW	11	Hwang Hee-chan		(substituted on) 54'
FW	9	Cho Gue-sung		(substituted on) 64'
MF	5	Park Yong-woo		(substituted on) 64'
MF	8	Hong Hyun-seok		(substituted on) 104'
MF	16	Park Jin-seop		(substituted on) 117'
Manager:
(Germany) Jürgen Klinsmann

Man of the Match:
Jo Hyeon-woo (South Korea)

Assistant referees:
Andrey Tsapenko (Uzbekistan)
Timur Gaynullin (Uzbekistan)
Fourth official:
Adham Makhadmeh (Jordan)
Reserve assistant referee:
Ahmad Abbas (Kuwait)
Video assistant referee:
Ahmad Al-Ali (Kuwait)
Assistant video assistant referees:
Adel Al-Naqbi (United Arab Emirates)

=== Bahrain vs Japan ===
The two teams met each other for the first time in the AFC Asian Cup since the 2004 semi-final, when Japan won in a thrilling encounter. In terms of other competitive fixtures, this was the first time since the 2011 AFC Asian Cup qualification that they met each other, with each claiming one win.

Although Bahrain attempted to pressure Japan at the first minutes, Bahrain failed to capitalise on their opportunities before being punished in the 31st minute when, from a long-range shot by Seiya Maikuma that hit the right post, Ritsu Dōan was able to score from the deflected ball despite frantic attempts by Bahraini players. The situation turned increasingly favourable for Japan when, four minutes into the second half, Hazza Ali misjudged the movement of Dōan before delivering the ball to Takefusa Kubo, breaking the Bahraini offside trap and allowing Kubo to score Japan's second goal after VAR confirmation. Bahrain scored in the 64th minute when from a corner kick by Kamil Al-Aswad, Sayed Baqer's header forced Zion Suzuki to save, but when the ball went high, miscommunication between Suzuki and Ayase Ueda resulted in an own goal credited to Ueda. Ueda redeemed himself in the 72nd minute when from a set-piece, the ball was given to Maikuma before he passed to Ueda; Ueda made a smart move to break through the Bahraini defenders surrounding him at the left flank, before taking a shot over Ebrahim Lutfalla to secure Japan's win.

This win meant Japan had managed to reach the quarter-finals of every AFC Asian Cup since 1996, the year where the quarter-finals was first introduced. On the other hand, Bahrain had failed to find a win in a knockout stage match since 2004 (2–2 against Uzbekistan before winning 4–3 on penalties).

31 January 2024
14:30

Bahrain	1–3	Japan
Ueda 64' (o.g.)	Report	Dōan 31'; Kubo 49'; Ueda 72'

Al Thumama Stadium, Doha
Attendance: 31,832
Referee: Ahmad Al-Ali (Kuwait)

Bahrain	Japan

GK	22	Ebrahim Lutfalla
RB	18	Mohamed Adel
CB	4	Sayed Baqer
CB	3	Waleed Al Hayam (c)	(yellow card) 79'
LB	19	Hazza Ali		(substituted off) 90+2'
DM	6	Mohamed Al-Hardan		(substituted off) 77'
CM	15	Jasim Al-Shaikh		(substituted off) 90+2'
CM	10	Kamil Al-Aswad		(substituted off) 77'
RF	7	Ali Madan
CF	8	Mohamed Marhoon		(substituted off) 64'
LF	9	Abdulla Yusuf Helal	(yellow card) 52'
Substitutions:
FW	20	Mahdi Al-Humaidan		(substituted on) 64'
MF	13	Moses Atede		(substituted on) 77'
FW	14	Abdullah Al-Hashash		(substituted on) 77'
DF	23	Abdullah Al-Khalasi		(substituted on) 90+2'
MF	24	Jasim Khelaif		(substituted on) 90+2'
Manager:
(Spain) Juan Antonio Pizzi

GK	23	Zion Suzuki
RB	16	Seiya Maikuma	(yellow card) 57'
CB	4	Ko Itakura
CB	22	Takehiro Tomiyasu
LB	19	Yūta Nakayama
CM	20	Takefusa Kubo		(substituted off) 68'
CM	6	Wataru Endō (c)
CM	17	Reo Hatate		(substituted off) 35'
AM	10	Ritsu Dōan		(substituted off) 80'
AM	13	Keito Nakamura		(substituted off) 68'
CF	9	Ayase Ueda		(substituted off) 80'
Substitutions:
MF	5	Hidemasa Morita		(substituted on) 35'
MF	8	Takumi Minamino		(substituted on) 68'
MF	7	Kaoru Mitoma		(substituted on) 68'
FW	18	Takuma Asano		(substituted on) 80'
DF	15	Kōki Machida		(substituted on) 80'
Manager:
Hajime Moriyasu

Man of the Match:
Wataru Endō (Japan)

Assistant referees:
Abdulhadi Al-Anezi (Kuwait)
Ahmad Abbas (Kuwait)
Fourth official:
Mohanad Qasim Sarray (Iraq)
Reserve assistant referee:
Ahmed Al-Baghdadi (Iraq)
Video assistant referee:
Mohammed Abdulla Hassan Mohamed (United Arab Emirates)
Assistant video assistant referees:
Adel Al-Naqbi (United Arab Emirates)

=== Iran vs Syria ===
This match was the two teams' first ever Asian Cup encounter in 44 years, with Iran held to a goalless draw in Syria's debut at the 1980 Asian Cup. However, they had met in the recent fixture during the 2022 FIFA World Cup qualification, which Iran won 4–0 on aggregate.

Iran began the match brightly, but struggled to break down the Syrian defence until the 32nd minute when, from a high lob by Alireza Jahanbakhsh, Mehdi Taremi received the ball in the box. Syrian defender Aiham Ousou pulled Taremi on the ground, granting Iran a penalty kick. Taremi scored the spot kick to give Iran the lead. Syria would then gain a similar penalty in the second half when, from another lob by Omar Khribin combined with a misjudged header from Shojae Khalilzadeh, Pablo Sabbag made a deep run before being fouled by Alireza Beiranvand. A lengthy VAR check confirmed a penalty which Khribin converted in the 64th minute. Momentum moved in the direction of Syria when Taremi received a second yellow card due to a foul against Alaa Al Dali. Despite this numerical advantage however, Syria could not capitalise and this proved to be costly for the Syrians when the game headed to the sudden death, as ten-men Iran managed to convert all five penalty kicks, while Fahd Youssef missed the second penalty for Syria to end his team's run.

31 January 2024
19:00

Iran	1–1 (a.e.t.)	Syria
Taremi 34' (pen.)	Report	Khribin 64' (pen.)
Penalties
Ansarifard (penalty scored); Rezaeian (penalty scored); Ebrahimi (penalty scored); Torabi (penalty scored); Hajsafi (penalty scored)	5–3	(penalty scored) Sabbag; (penalty missed) Youssef; (penalty scored) Ousou; (penalty scored) Al Dali

Abdullah bin Khalifa Stadium, Doha
Attendance: 8,720
Referee: Kim Jong-hyeok (South Korea)

Iran	Syria

GK	1	Alireza Beiranvand	(yellow card) 62'
RB	23	Ramin Rezaeian
CB	15	Rouzbeh Cheshmi
CB	4	Shojae Khalilzadeh	(yellow card) 16'
LB	3	Ehsan Hajsafi (c)
CM	14	Saman Ghoddos		(substituted off) 63'
CM	6	Saeid Ezatolahi	(yellow card) 71'
RW	7	Alireza Jahanbakhsh		(substituted off) 74'
AM	9	Mehdi Taremi	(yellow card) 81' (yellow-red card) 90+1'
LW	18	Mehdi Ghayedi		(substituted off) 63'
CF	20	Sardar Azmoun		(substituted off) 90+8'
Substitutions:
MF	21	Mohammad Mohebi	(yellow card) 72'	(substituted on) 63'
MF	8	Omid Ebrahimi		(substituted on) 63'
MF	17	Ali Gholizadeh		(substituted on) 74'	(substituted off) 119'
FW	10	Karim Ansarifard		(substituted on) 90+8'
MF	16	Mehdi Torabi		(substituted on) 119'
Manager:
Amir Ghalenoei

GK	22	Ahmad Madania
RB	24	Abdul Rahman Weiss
CB	2	Aiham Ousou
CB	13	Thaer Krouma
LB	3	Moayad Ajan
RM	25	Mahmoud Al Aswad	(yellow card) 24'	(substituted off) 58'
CM	18	Jalil Elías
CM	4	Ezequiel Ham
LM	12	Ammar Ramadan		(substituted off) 87'
CF	7	Omar Khribin (c)		(substituted off) 87'
CF	21	Ibrahim Hesar	(yellow card) 90+8'
Substitutions:
FW	11	Pablo Sabbag		(substituted on) 58'
MF	17	Fahd Youssef		(substituted on) 87'
FW	9	Alaa Al Dali		(substituted on) 87'
Manager:
(Argentina) Héctor Cúper

Man of the Match:
Ahmad Madania (Syria)

Assistant referees:
Yoon Jae-yeol (South Korea)
Park Sang-jun (South Korea)
Fourth official:
Abdulrahman Al-Jassim (Qatar)
Reserve assistant referee:
Taleb Al-Marri (Qatar)
Video assistant referee:
Kim Hee-gon (South Korea)
Assistant video assistant referees:
Khamis Al-Marri (Qatar)

== Quarter-finals ==
=== Tajikistan vs Jordan ===
This was the first ever Asian Cup meeting between the two, with their most recent competitive fixture occurring at the 2026 FIFA World Cup qualification, in which they were held to a 1–1 draw. As none of these teams had ever reached the semi-finals, the winners of this fixture would create history.

Jordan proved more dominant than Tajikistan at the first half, but failed to convert any of their chances into goal while Tajikistan also proved dangerous, although Tajikistan could not capitalise on it either. After a goalless first half, the Jordanians finally broke through, albeit aided by luck when, from a corner kick at the 66th minute by Mahmoud Al-Mardi, Abdallah Nasib triumphantly headed, but it hit the back of Vahdat Hanonov before going home to give Jordan the first and, turn out, the only goal of the match as Jordan secured the hard-fought 1–0 win.

This result put an end to Tajikistan's dream run in their debut. Meanwhile, this was historic for Jordan as they managed to advance to the Asian Cup semi-finals for the first time ever.

2 February 2024
14:30

Tajikistan	0–1	Jordan
	Report	Hanonov 66' (o.g.)

Ahmad bin Ali Stadium, Al Rayyan
Attendance: 35,530
Referee: Fu Ming (China)

Tajikistan	Jordan

GK	1	Rustam Yatimov
RB	5	Manuchekhr Safarov
CB	6	Vahdat Hanonov
CB	2	Zoir Dzhuraboyev
LB	19	Akhtam Nazarov (c)
RM	15	Shervoni Mabatshoev
CM	7	Parvizdzhon Umarbayev
CM	14	Alisher Shukurov	(yellow card) 79'
LM	17	Ehson Panjshanbe
CF	22	Shahrom Samiev		(substituted off) 29'
CF	10	Alisher Dzhalilov		(substituted off) 77'
Substitutions:
FW	9	Rustam Soirov		(substituted on) 29' (substituted off) 82'
FW	25	Nuriddin Khamrokulov		(substituted on) 77'
MF	20	Alidzhoni Ayni		(substituted on) 82'
Manager:
(Croatia) Petar Šegrt

GK	1	Yazid Abu Layla
CB	3	Abdallah Nasib
CB	5	Yazan Al-Arab
CB	17	Salem Al-Ajalin	(yellow card) 68'
RM	23	Ihsan Haddad (c)
CM	14	Rajaei Ayed	(yellow card) 72'	(substituted off) 89'
CM	8	Noor Al-Rawabdeh		(substituted off) 79'
LM	13	Mahmoud Al-Mardi		(substituted off) 80'
RF	10	Musa Al-Taamari		(substituted off) 90+6'
CF	11	Yazan Al-Naimat		(substituted off) 89'
LF	9	Ali Olwan	(yellow card) 83'
Substitutions:
MF	15	Ibrahim Sadeh		(substituted on) 79'
DF	2	Mohammad Abu Hashish		(substituted on) 80'
MF	25	Anas Al-Awadat		(substituted on) 89'
MF	26	Fadi Awad		(substituted on) 89'
MF	24	Yousef Abu Jalboush		(substituted on) 90+6'
Manager:
(Morocco) Hussein Ammouta

Man of the Match:
Mahmoud Al-Mardi (Jordan)

Assistant referees:
Zhou Fei (China)
Zhang Cheng (China)
Fourth official:
Yusuke Araki (Japan)
Reserve assistant referee:
Zaid Al-Shammari (Saudi Arabia)
Video assistant referee:
Jumpei Iida (Japan)
Assistant video assistant referees:
Sivakorn Pu-udom (Thailand)

=== Australia vs South Korea ===
This was their fourth meeting in the AFC Asian Cup, and the first one since 2015, during which Australia lost to South Korea at the group stage, only to triumph at the final to win Australia's only Asian Cup title to date.

Despite South Korea dominating possession, it was the Australians who grabbed more dangerous chances to score at the first place, and Australia got the reward at the 42nd minute when, from a failed clearance by Hwang In-beom, Craig Goodwin intercepted before a number of inside the box pass by Mitchell Duke, Connor Metcalfe and Nathaniel Atkinson saw Atkinson's fickled to Goodwin for a volley to open the scoring. Australia then put up a fierce resistance to neutralise the South Koreans but, as the game was thought to be over, a foul by Lewis Miller on Son Heung-min as the South Korean talisman was dribbling into the box right at the fourth minute of added time granted a penalty, which Hwang Hee-chan did not waste it to push the game to extra time. Son then overturned the game in South Korea's favour when from yet another Miller's foul on Hwang Hee-chan, he took a brilliant free kick home at the 104th minute. Following a dangerous foul by Aiden O'Neill on Hwang Hee-chan at the added minutes of the extra time's first half, O'Neill was sent off, killing any hope for an Australian comeback.

It was the first time that South Korea managed to defeat Australia in a decisive knockout stage match of a competitive tournament, having only won just two competitive fixtures at the group stage. In personal record, Graham Arnold had lost all three quarter-finals fixtures at the Asian Cup as coach of Australia (lost 4–3 on penalties to Japan in 2007 and lost 1–0 to the United Arab Emirates in 2019).

2 February 2024
18:30

Australia	1–2 (a.e.t.)	South Korea
Goodwin 42'	Report	Hwang Hee-chan 90+6' (pen.); Son Heung-min 104'

Al Janoub Stadium, Al Wakrah
Attendance: 39,632
Referee: Ahmed Al-Kaf (Oman)

Australia	South Korea

GK	1	Mathew Ryan (c)
RB	3	Nathaniel Atkinson		(substituted off) 73'
CB	19	Harry Souttar	(yellow card) 45+1'
CB	4	Kye Rowles
LB	16	Aziz Behich
DM	17	Keanu Baccus		(substituted off) 70'
CM	8	Connor Metcalfe		(substituted off) 70'
CM	22	Jackson Irvine
RF	6	Martin Boyle		(substituted off) 87'
CF	15	Mitchell Duke		(substituted off) 92'
LF	23	Craig Goodwin		(substituted off) 73'
Substitutions:
MF	14	Riley McGree		(substituted on) 70'
MF	13	Aiden O'Neill	(red card) 105+4'	(substituted on) 70'
DF	5	Jordan Bos		(substituted on) 73'
DF	20	Lewis Miller		(substituted on) 73'
DF	21	Cameron Burgess		(substituted on) 87'
FW	9	Bruno Fornaroli		(substituted on) 92'
Manager:
Graham Arnold

GK	21	Jo Hyeon-woo
RB	23	Kim Tae-hwan		(substituted off) 85'
CB	4	Kim Min-jae	(yellow card) 90+1'
CB	19	Kim Young-gwon
LB	22	Seol Young-woo
CM	5	Park Yong-woo		(substituted off) 105'
CM	6	Hwang In-beom		(substituted off) 77'
RW	18	Lee Kang-in		(substituted off) 120+1'
AM	7	Son Heung-min (c)
LW	11	Hwang Hee-chan		(substituted off) 105'
CF	9	Cho Gue-sung		(substituted off) 69'
Substitutions:
MF	10	Lee Jae-sung		(substituted on) 69'
MF	8	Hong Hyun-seok		(substituted on) 77'
MF	26	Yang Hyun-jun		(substituted on) 85'
MF	16	Park Jin-seop		(substituted on) 105'
FW	20	Oh Hyeon-gyu		(substituted on) 105'
DF	15	Jung Seung-hyun		(substituted on) 120+1'
Manager:
(Germany) Jürgen Klinsmann

Man of the Match:
Son Heung-min (South Korea)

Assistant referees:
Abu Bakar Al-Amri (Oman)
Rashid Al-Ghaithi (Oman)
Fourth official:
Adel Al-Naqbi (United Arab Emirates)
Reserve assistant referee:
Hasan Al-Mahri (United Arab Emirates)
Video assistant referee:
Mohammed Abdulla Hassan Mohamed (United Arab Emirates)
Assistant video assistant referees:
Omar Al-Ali (United Arab Emirates)

=== Iran vs Japan ===
This was the fifth Asian Cup meeting between Iran and Japan, two Asian football powerhouses, with their most recent Asian Cup meeting occurring in the previous edition's semi-final, where Japan won 3–0. Iran had never managed to defeat nor even score a goal against Japan in all of four Asian Cup meetings (two draws, two losses).

The match started on the bright note for Japan as the Japanese applied immense pressure against Iran and forced Iran on the defence. Ultimately, from a howling defence by the Iranians at the 28th minute, an unmarked Hidemasa Morita soloed over four Iranian players before produced a shot, which hit the foot of Alireza Beiranvand before going into the net to secure Japan's lead at the first half. However, Iran put up a strong fight back in the second half and it was Iran who applied pressure on Japan in the surprise. Ultimately, Iran got the reward at the 55th minute when Mohammad Mohebi capitalised from Sardar Azmoun's pass to neutralise Japan's offside trap before thunderously scored to put the game to a draw. Iran did not reduce the pressure later on, and as the match was heading to extra time, miscommunication between Kō Itakura and Takehiro Tomiyasu at the third minute of injury time allowed Hossein Kanaanizadegan to sneak in, forced Itakura to commit a foul and thus Iran got the penalty. Alireza Jahanbakhsh successfully converted later on as Iran secured a historic win over the 2019 finalists.

This result was the first time in the Asian Cup that Iran managed to score and won against Japan. Meanwhile, this result marked Japan's worst performance in the Asian Cup since making their debut in 1988, with three wins and two losses. Worse, it was the first time ever that Japan failed to keep a shutout in an Asian Cup tournament.

3 February 2024
14:30

Iran	2–1	Japan
Mohebi 55'; Jahanbakhsh 90+6' (pen.)	Report	Morita 28'

Education City Stadium, Al Rayyan
Attendance: 35,640
Referee: Ma Ning (China)

Iran	Japan

GK	1	Alireza Beiranvand
RB	23	Ramin Rezaeian
CB	13	Hossein Kanaanizadegan
CB	4	Shojae Khalilzadeh
LB	5	Milad Mohammadi
CM	8	Omid Ebrahimi
CM	6	Saeid Ezatolahi
RW	7	Alireza Jahanbakhsh (c)
AM	14	Saman Ghoddos	(substituted off) 90+8'
LW	21	Mohammad Mohebi	(substituted off) 90+8'
CF	20	Sardar Azmoun	(substituted off) 90+9'
Substitutions:
MF	15	Rouzbeh Cheshmi	(substituted on) 90+8'
MF	16	Mehdi Torabi	(substituted on) 90+8'
FW	10	Karim Ansarifard	(substituted on) 90+9'
Manager:
Amir Ghalenoei

GK	23	Zion Suzuki
RB	16	Seiya Maikuma
CB	4	Kō Itakura	(yellow card) 24'
CB	22	Takehiro Tomiyasu
LB	21	Hiroki Itō
DM	6	Wataru Endō (c)
CM	20	Takefusa Kubo		(substituted off) 67'
CM	5	Hidemasa Morita		(substituted off) 90+9'
RF	10	Ritsu Dōan		(substituted off) 90+8'
CF	9	Ayase Ueda	(yellow card) 48'
LF	25	Daizen Maeda		(substituted off) 67'
Substitutions:
MF	7	Kaoru Mitoma		(substituted on) 67'
MF	8	Takumi Minamino		(substituted on) 67'
FW	18	Takuma Asano		(substituted on) 90+8'
FW	11	Mao Hosoya		(substituted on) 90+9'
Manager:
Hajime Moriyasu

Man of the Match:
Alireza Jahanbakhsh (Iran)

Assistant referees:
Anton Shchetinin (Australia)
Ashley Beecham (Australia)
Fourth official:
Nazmi Nasaruddin (Malaysia)
Reserve assistant referee:
Mohamad Zairul bin Khalil Tan (Malaysia)
Video assistant referee:
Sivakorn Pu-udom (Thailand)
Assistant video assistant referees:
Muhammad Taqi (Singapore)

=== Qatar vs Uzbekistan ===
This was their first meeting at the Asian Cup since 2011, which was also hosted by Qatar; in the 2011 opening fixture, Qatar lost 2–0 to Uzbekistan. The most recent competitive fixtures between them occurred during the 2018 FIFA World Cup qualification, which also ended with Uzbekistan claiming two 1–0 victories.

The match started in an unexpected note that favoured Qatar when at the 27th minute, from a throw-in in Uzbekistan's left flank, Almoez Ali's backheel for Hassan Al-Haydos saw Qatar's captain sprung before took a shot; Utkir Yusupov's attempt to punch it away instead deflected to the net to give the hosts the lead. However, Uzbekistan would reduce the deficit at the 59th minute when, from a direct counterattack, connected headers by the Uzbeks combined with Qatari defenders' misjudgements of Uzbekistani players' movement allowed Odiljon Hamrobekov to sprint over the Qatari defenders before he took a lethal shot that gave no chance for Meshaal Barsham to deny. After this goal, Qatar and Uzbekistan were unwilling to commit further for frontal attacks, which extended to even the extra time, pushing the game into the sudden death. On the spot, Meshaal Barsham proved to be the better one with his movement predictions better than the Uzbekistani counterpart, as Qatar went on to win the game 3–2 on penalties to reach the semi-finals.

3 February 2024
18:30

Qatar	1–1 (a.e.t.)	Uzbekistan
Al-Haydos 27'	Report	Hamrobekov 59'
Penalties
Afif (penalty scored); Ali (penalty missed); Mukhtar (penalty missed); Al-Brake (penalty scored); Ró-Ró (penalty scored)	3–2	(penalty scored) Shukurov; (penalty missed) Ashurmatov; (penalty scored) Umarov; (penalty missed) Abdurakhmatov; (penalty missed) Masharipov

Al Bayt Stadium, Al Khor
Attendance: 58,791
Referee: Kim Hee-gon (South Korea)

Qatar	Uzbekistan

GK	22	Meshaal Barsham	(yellow card) 46'
CB	5	Tarek Salman		(substituted off) 90'
CB	3	Al-Mahdi Ali Mukhtar
CB	12	Lucas Mendes
RM	2	Ró-Ró	(yellow card) 105'
CM	24	Jassem Gaber		(substituted off) 81'
CM	20	Ahmed Fatehi		(substituted off) 104'
CM	10	Hassan Al-Haydos (c)		(substituted off) 54'
LM	4	Mohammed Waad		(substituted off) 108'
CF	11	Akram Afif
CF	19	Almoez Ali	(yellow card) 90+1'
Substitutions:
FW	13	Khalid Muneer	(yellow card) 89'	(substituted on) 54'
MF	6	Abdulaziz Hatem		(substituted on) 81'
FW	17	Ismaeel Mohammad		(substituted on) 90'
MF	23	Mostafa Meshaal		(substituted on) 104'
DF	18	Sultan Al-Brake		(substituted on) 108'
Manager:
(Spain) Tintín Márquez

GK	1	Utkir Yusupov
CB	18	Abdulla Abdullaev
CB	15	Umar Eshmurodov
CB	5	Rustam Ashurmatov	(yellow card) 90'
RM	19	Azizbek Turgunboev		(substituted off) 105'
CM	9	Odiljon Hamrobekov
CM	7	Otabek Shukurov	(yellow card) 69'
LM	4	Farrukh Sayfiev		(substituted off) 99'
RF	11	Oston Urunov		(substituted off) 74'
CF	10	Jaloliddin Masharipov (c)
LF	22	Abbosbek Fayzullaev		(substituted off) 114'
Substitutions:
MF	23	Shokhboz Umarov		(substituted on) 74'
DF	26	Zafarmurod Abdurakhmatov		(substituted on) 99'
DF	2	Mukhammadkodir Khamraliev		(substituted on) 105'
MF	20	Khojimat Erkinov		(substituted on) 114'
Manager:
(Slovenia) Srečko Katanec			(yellow card) 80'

Man of the Match:
Meshaal Barsham (Qatar)

Assistant referees:
Yoon Jae-yeol (South Korea)
Park Sang-jun (South Korea)
Fourth official:
Abdullah Jamali (Kuwait)
Reserve assistant referee:
Abdulhadi Al-Anezi (Kuwait)
Video assistant referee:
Kim Jong-hyeok (South Korea)
Assistant video assistant referees:
Ahmad Al-Ali (Kuwait)

== Semi-finals ==
=== Jordan vs South Korea ===
It was the third meeting between the two teams in the Asian Cup and the second in this tournament, as they previously met in the second match of group E which ended in a 2–2 draw.

Despite being the stronger team on paper, South Korea's leaky defence saw them constantly under pressure by the energetic Jordanians, as South Korea failed to produce any meaningful attack in the first half. South Korea's ultimately collapsed in the second half when at the 53rd minute, Park Yong-woo's misjudged pass was capitalised by Musa Al-Taamari, who then produced a run before sending to Yazan Al-Naimat as Al-Naimat lobbed over Jo Hyeon-woo to open the score. Al-Taamari then brilliantly finished the game at the 66th minute following a solo by himself before his thunderous shot to the right bottom corner gave no chance for Jo Hyeon-woo to deny.

This win meant Jordan achieved two historic firsts, by beating South Korea for the first time and reaching their first Asian Cup final. Meanwhile, South Korea's Asian Cup title drought that began with their most recent title in 1960 have been extended to at least 67 years.

6 February 2024
18:00

Jordan	2–0	South Korea
Al-Naimat 53'; Al-Taamari 66'	Report

Ahmad bin Ali Stadium, Al Rayyan
Attendance: 42,850
Referee: Mohammed Abdulla Hassan Mohamed (United Arab Emirates)

Jordan	South Korea

GK	1	Yazid Abu Layla
CB	3	Abdallah Nasib
CB	5	Yazan Al-Arab
CB	4	Bara' Marei
RM	23	Ihsan Haddad (c)	(yellow card) 45+2'
CM	21	Nizar Al-Rashdan		(substituted off) 90+2'
CM	8	Noor Al-Rawabdeh
LM	2	Mohammad Abu Hashish	(yellow card) 64'
RF	10	Musa Al-Taamari
CF	11	Yazan Al-Naimat		(substituted off) 85'
LF	13	Mahmoud Al-Mardi		(substituted off) 90+2'
Substitutions:
MF	25	Anas Al-Awadat		(substituted on) 85'
MF	15	Ibrahim Sadeh		(substituted on) 90+2'
MF	14	Rajaei Ayed		(substituted on) 90+2'
Manager:
(Morocco) Hussein Ammouta

GK	21	Jo Hyeon-woo
RB	23	Kim Tae-hwan
CB	15	Jung Seung-hyun	(yellow card) 84'
CB	19	Kim Young-gwon
LB	22	Seol Young-woo
DM	5	Park Yong-woo		(substituted off) 56'
CM	10	Lee Jae-sung		(substituted off) 81'
CM	6	Hwang In-beom	(yellow card) 15'
RF	18	Lee Kang-in
CF	7	Son Heung-min (c)
LF	11	Hwang Hee-chan		(substituted off) 81'
Substitutions:
FW	9	Cho Gue-sung	(yellow card) 89'	(substituted on) 56'
MF	17	Jeong Woo-yeong		(substituted on) 81'
MF	26	Yang Hyun-jun		(substituted on) 81'
Manager:
(Germany) Jürgen Klinsmann

Man of the Match:
Musa Al-Taamari (Jordan)

Assistant referees:
Mohamed Al-Hammadi (United Arab Emirates)
Hasan Al-Mahri (United Arab Emirates)
Fourth official:
Ma Ning (China)
Reserve assistant referee:
Zhou Fei (China)
Video assistant referee:
Omar Al-Ali (United Arab Emirates)
Assistant video assistant referees:
Jumpei Iida (Japan)

=== Iran vs Qatar ===
This was the first AFC Asian Cup meeting between the two nations since 2015, where Iran defeated Qatar 1–0 to eliminate Qatar from the tournament. The two's most recent meeting in other competitive fixtures occurred during the 2018 FIFA World Cup qualification, which also ended with Iran winning 2–0 and 1–0. Ahead of the semi-final clash, the Iranian federation complained of only four percent of the seats having been allocated to Iranian supporters, even though AFC regulations state eight percent need to be allocated.

The match started on a bright note for the Iranians when Sardar Azmoun, capitalising from Alireza Jahanbakhsh's throw-in that resulted in a chaotic ball fight in Qatar's box and poor attempt by Ró-Ró, delivered a brilliant bicycle kick at the fourth minute to give Iran the lead. This, however, triggered the Qatari fightback and Jassem Gaber soon found an equaliser for the hosts at the 17th minute, when from a smart pass by Akram Afif, Gaber took a shot that deflected to the feet of Saeid Ezatolahi high to make it impossible for Alireza Beiranvand to deny. Empowered by the goal, Afif would soon produce a solo in Iran's right flank at the 43rd minute thanked to an effort by teammate Ahmed Fatehi before taking a curl home to give Qatar the lead. When the match restarted, Fatehi committed a handball right at the first minute of the second half, resulted in a penalty that saw Jahanbakhsh equalised for Iran. However, Qatar dealt the final blow at the 82nd minute when, from an Afif's crossing again on Iran's right flank, Shojae Khalilzadeh wrongfully headed to Abdulaziz Hatem, allowing Hatem to provide ball for Almoez Ali as Qatar's main talisman didn't miss out to struck the third. Iran's hope for a comeback was eventually killed at the first minute of added time when Khalilzadeh himself was forced to foul Afif to prevent Afif's sprint, resulted in Khalilzadeh dismissal.

With this result, Qatar successfully defeated Iran for the first time in a competitive fixture since the 1998 FIFA World Cup qualification (a 2–0 win), and also for the first time Qatar defeated Iran in an AFC Asian Cup match. Meanwhile, this loss meant Iran's Asian Cup drought has been extended to at least 51 years since they last won the tournament in 1976, which was also the last time Iran managed to reach the final. In personal record, this defeat meant Amir Ghalenoei suffered his first loss as coach of the Iranian side on his second stint.

7 February 2024
18:00

Iran	2–3	Qatar
Azmoun 4'; Jahanbakhsh 51' (pen.)	Report	Gaber 17'; Afif 43'; Ali 82'

Al Thumama Stadium, Doha
Attendance: 40,342
Referee: Ahmad Al-Ali (Kuwait)

Iran	Qatar

GK	1	Alireza Beiranvand
RB	23	Ramin Rezaeian		(substituted off) 87'
CB	13	Hossein Kanaanizadegan
CB	4	Shojae Khalilzadeh	(red card) 90+3'
LB	3	Ehsan Hajsafi (c)	(yellow card) 21'	(substituted off) 46'
CM	6	Saeid Ezatolahi
CM	8	Omid Ebrahimi		(substituted off) 46'
RW	7	Alireza Jahanbakhsh
AM	14	Saman Ghoddos
LW	9	Mehdi Taremi		(substituted off) 90+8'
CF	20	Sardar Azmoun
Substitutions:
DF	5	Milad Mohammadi		(substituted on) 46'
MF	21	Mohammad Mohebi		(substituted on) 46'
FW	26	Shahriyar Moghanlou		(substituted on) 87'
FW	11	Reza Asadi		(substituted on) 90+8'
Manager:
Amir Ghalenoei

GK	22	Meshaal Barsham
RB	2	Ró-Ró		(substituted off) 64'
CB	3	Al-Mahdi Ali Mukhtar (c)	(yellow card) 40'	(substituted off) 68'
CB	12	Lucas Mendes
LB	4	Mohammed Waad
RM	9	Yusuf Abdurisag		(substituted off) 63'
CM	24	Jassem Gaber		(substituted off) 81'
CM	20	Ahmed Fatehi	(yellow card) 50'
LM	14	Homam Ahmed		(substituted off) 46'
CF	19	Almoez Ali
CF	11	Akram Afif
Substitutions:
FW	17	Ismaeel Mohammad		(substituted on) 46'
MF	10	Hassan Al-Haydos		(substituted on) 63'
DF	5	Tarek Salman		(substituted on) 64'
DF	16	Boualem Khoukhi		(substituted on) 68'
MF	6	Abdulaziz Hatem		(substituted on) 81'
Manager:
(Spain) Tintín Márquez

Man of the Match:
Akram Afif (Qatar)

Assistant referees:
Abdulhadi Al-Anezi (Kuwait)
Mohamad Zairul Bin Khalil Tan (Malaysia)
Fourth official:
Jumpei Iida (Japan)
Reserve assistant referee:
Zhang Cheng (China)
Video assistant referee:
Sivakorn Pu-udom (Thailand)
Assistant video assistant referees:
Fu Ming (China)

== Final ==
The match was originally scheduled to take place at Al Bayt Stadium, Al Khor. However, the AFC confirmed on 21 August 2023 that the match would be moved to Lusail Stadium, Lusail, due to significant interest for fans.

Jordan previously twice played Qatar in the Asian Cup qualifiers, for the 1984 edition where Jordan lost 2–0 and for the 2000 edition where they drew 2–2.

10 February 2024
18:00

Jordan	1–3	Qatar
Al-Naimat 67'	Report	Afif 22' (pen.), 73' (pen.), 90+5' (pen.)

Lusail Stadium, Lusail
Attendance: 86,492
Referee: Ma Ning (China)

Jordan	Qatar

GK	1	Yazeed Abulaila	(yellow card) 90+4'
CB	3	Abdallah Nasib
CB	5	Yazan Al-Arab
CB	17	Salem Al-Ajalin	(yellow card) 45+7'
RM	23	Ihsan Haddad (c)
CM	21	Nizar Al-Rashdan
CM	8	Noor Al-Rawabdeh
LM	13	Mahmoud Al-Mardi		(substituted off) 80'
RF	10	Musa Al-Taamari
CF	11	Yazan Al-Naimat	(yellow card) 86'
LF	9	Ali Olwan	(yellow card) 18'	(substituted off) 90+5'
Substitutions:
MF	18	Saleh Rateb		(substituted on) 80'
MF	25	Anas Al-Awadat		(substituted on) 90+5'
Manager:
(Morocco) Hussein Ammouta

GK	22	Meshaal Barsham	(yellow card) 90+16'
CB	5	Tarek Salman
CB	3	Al-Mahdi Ali Mukhtar		(substituted off) 81'
CB	12	Lucas Mendes
RM	9	Yusuf Abdurisag		(substituted off) 63'
CM	24	Jassem Gaber		(substituted off) 53'
CM	20	Ahmed Fatehi
CM	10	Hassan Al-Haydos (c)		(substituted off) 53'
LM	4	Mohammed Waad
CF	19	Almoez Ali
CF	11	Akram Afif
Substitutions:
MF	8	Ali Assadalla	(yellow card) 90+9'	(substituted on) 53'
MF	6	Abdulaziz Hatem		(substituted on) 53'
FW	17	Ismaeel Mohammad		(substituted on) 63'
DF	16	Boualem Khoukhi		(substituted on) 81'
Manager:
(Spain) Tintín Márquez

== See also ==
- List of AFC Asian Cup finals
