= 2023 AFC Asian Cup final =

Association football match

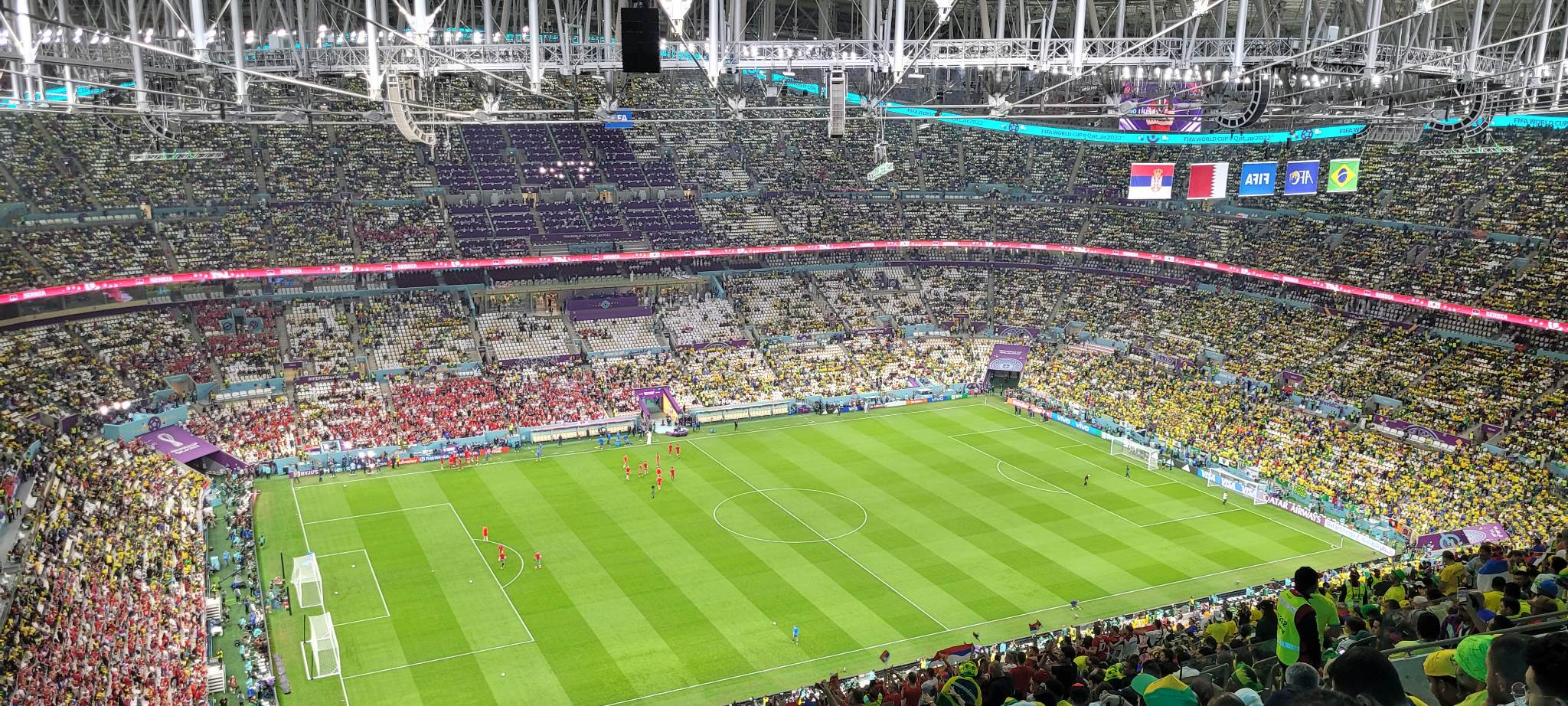
- Lusail Stadium hosted the final.
- Event: 2023 AFC Asian Cup
Jordan	Qatar
(Jordan)	(Qatar)
1	3
- Date: 10 February 2024
- Venue: Lusail Stadium, Lusail
- Man of the Match: Akram Afif (Qatar)
- Referee: Ma Ning (China)
- Attendance: 86,492
- Weather: Clear; 20 °C (68 °F); 60% humidity

The 2023 AFC Asian Cup final was a football match which determined the winner of the 2023 AFC Asian Cup, the 18th edition of the AFC Asian Cup, a quadrennial tournament contested by the men's national teams of the member associations of the Asian Football Confederation. The match was held at the Lusail Stadium in Lusail, Qatar, on 10 February 2024 between first-time finalists Jordan and the host country and defending champions Qatar.

Qatar successfully defended the title after a 3–1 victory against Jordan, who were playing in their first major tournament final. Akram Afif earned a hat trick by scoring three penalties to make Qatar the first team to retain the Asian Cup since Japan in 2004.

== Venue ==
The final was originally set to be played at the Al Bayt Stadium, Al Khor. However it was moved to the higher-capacity Lusail Stadium, Lusail on 21 August 2023. This was the second match of the tournament played at the stadium, following the opening match on 12 January 2024.

== Route to the final ==
Jordan
Round
Qatar
Opponents
Result
Group stage
Opponents
Result
Malaysia
4–0
Match 1
Lebanon
3–0
South Korea
2–2
Match 2
Tajikistan
1–0
Bahrain
0–1
Match 3
China
1–0
Group E third place

Pos	Team	Pld	Pts
1	Bahrain	3	6
2	South Korea	3	5
3	Jordan	3	4
4	Malaysia	3	1

Source: AFC
Final standings
Group A winners

Pos	Team	Pld	Pts
1	Qatar (H)	3	9
2	Tajikistan	3	4
3	China	3	2
4	Lebanon	3	1

Source: AFC
(H) Hosts
Opponents
Result
Knockout stage
Opponents
Result
Iraq
3–2
Round of 16
Palestine
2–1
Tajikistan
1–0
Quarter-finals
Uzbekistan
1–1 (a.e.t.) (3–2 p)
South Korea
2–0
Semi-finals
Iran
3–2

== Match ==
=== Details ===
10 February 2024
18:00

Jordan	1–3	Qatar
Al-Naimat 67'	Report	Afif 22' (pen.), 73' (pen.), 90+5' (pen.)

Lusail Stadium, Lusail
Attendance: 86,492
Referee: Ma Ning (China)

Jordan	Qatar

GK	1	Yazeed Abulaila	(yellow card) 90+4'
CB	3	Abdallah Nasib
CB	5	Yazan Al-Arab
CB	17	Salem Al-Ajalin	(yellow card) 45+7'
RM	23	Ihsan Haddad (c)
CM	21	Nizar Al-Rashdan
CM	8	Noor Al-Rawabdeh
LM	13	Mahmoud Al-Mardi		(substituted off) 80'
RF	10	Musa Al-Taamari
CF	11	Yazan Al-Naimat	(yellow card) 86'
LF	9	Ali Olwan	(yellow card) 18'	(substituted off) 90+5'
Substitutions:
MF	18	Saleh Rateb		(substituted on) 80'
MF	25	Anas Al-Awadat		(substituted on) 90+5'
Manager:
(Morocco) Hussein Ammouta

GK	22	Meshaal Barsham	(yellow card) 90+16'
CB	5	Tarek Salman
CB	3	Al-Mahdi Ali Mukhtar		(substituted off) 81'
CB	12	Lucas Mendes
RM	9	Yusuf Abdurisag		(substituted off) 63'
CM	24	Jassem Gaber		(substituted off) 53'
CM	20	Ahmed Fatehi
CM	10	Hassan Al-Haydos (c)		(substituted off) 53'
LM	4	Mohammed Waad
CF	19	Almoez Ali
CF	11	Akram Afif
Substitutions:
MF	8	Ali Assadalla	(yellow card) 90+9'	(substituted on) 53'
MF	6	Abdulaziz Hatem		(substituted on) 53'
FW	17	Ismaeel Mohammad		(substituted on) 63'
DF	16	Boualem Khoukhi		(substituted on) 81'
Manager:
(Spain) Tintín Márquez

Man of the Match:
Akram Afif (Qatar)

Assistant referees:
Zhou Fei (China)
Zhang Cheng (China)
Fourth official:
Ilgiz Tantashev (Uzbekistan)
Reserve assistant referee:
Andrey Tsapenko (Uzbekistan)
Video assistant referee:
Fu Ming (China)
Assistant video assistant referees:
Jumpei Iida (Japan)

Match rules

- 90 minutes.
- 30 minutes of extra time if necessary.
- Penalty shoot-out if scores still level.
- Maximum of five substitutions, with a sixth allowed in extra time.

== See also ==
- List of AFC Asian Cup finals
- 2022 FIFA World Cup final – held in the same venue over a year prior contested between Argentina and France
- 2023 CONCACAF Gold Cup final
- 2023 Africa Cup of Nations final
- 2024 Copa América final
- UEFA Euro 2024 final
