= 2023 AFC Asian Cup Group A =

Group A of the 2023 AFC Asian Cup took place from 12 to 22 January 2024. The group consisted of hosts, defending and eventual champions Qatar, China, tournament debutants Tajikistan, and Lebanon. The top two teams, Qatar and Tajikistan, advanced to the round of 16.

== Teams ==
Draw position	Team	Zone	Method of qualification	Date of qualification	Finals appearance	Last appearance	Previous best performance	FIFA Rankings	
Draw position	Team	Zone	Method of qualification	Date of qualification	Finals appearance	Last appearance	Previous best performance	April 2023 (Note: The rankings of April 2023 were used for seeding for the final draw.)	December 2023
A1	Qatar	WAFF	Hosts and Second round Group E winners	7 June 2021	11th	2019	Winners (2019)	61	58
A2	China	EAFF	Second round Group A runners-up	15 June 2021	13th	2019	Runners-up (1984, 2004)	81	79
A3	Tajikistan	CAFA	Third round Group F winners	14 June 2022	1st	—	Debut	109	106
A4	Lebanon	WAFF	Second round Group H runners-up	15 June 2021	3rd	2019	Group stage (2000, 2019)	99	107

== Standings ==
Pos	Team	Pld	W	D	L	GF	GA	GD	Pts	Qualification
1	Qatar (H)	3	3	0	0	5	0	+5	9	Advance to knockout stage
2	Tajikistan	3	1	1	1	2	2	0	4	Advance to knockout stage
3	China	3	0	2	1	0	1	−1	2	
4	Lebanon	3	0	1	2	1	5	−4	1	

Source: AFC
Rules for classification: Group stage tiebreakers
(H) Hosts

== Matches ==
=== Qatar vs Lebanon ===
The match was originally scheduled to take place at Al Bayt Stadium, Al Khor. However, the AFC confirmed on 21 August 2023 that the match would be moved to Lusail Stadium, Lusail due to significant interest for fans.

This was the sides' second straight fixture in the tournament, having also met in the previous edition, which was won by Qatar 2–0. Qatar had never lost to Lebanon in their history, with ten wins and three draws in their thirteen previous meetings.

Akram Afif struck once late in each half and Almoez Ali scored another as Qatar cruised to a 3–0 win. Adding on to the seven out of seven matches won in their 2019 title-winning campaign, Qatar thus extended their streak to eight consecutive victories in the competition.

12 January 2024
19:00

Qatar	3–0	Lebanon
Afif 45', 90+6'; Ali 56'	Report

Lusail Stadium, Lusail
Attendance: 82,490
Referee: Alireza Faghani (Iran)

Qatar	Lebanon

GK	22	Meshaal Barsham
CB	2	Ró-Ró	(yellow card) 90'
CB	3	Al-Mahdi Ali Mukhtar
CB	12	Lucas Mendes
RM	9	Yusuf Abdurisag		(substituted off) 57'
CM	10	Hassan Al-Haydos (c)		(substituted off) 57'
CM	20	Ahmed Fatehi
CM	6	Abdulaziz Hatem		(substituted off) 79'
LM	4	Mohammed Waad		(substituted off) 72'
CF	19	Almoez Ali		(substituted off) 78'
CF	11	Akram Afif
Substitutions:
MF	23	Mostafa Meshaal		(substituted on) 57'
FW	17	Ismaeel Mohammad		(substituted on) 57'
DF	14	Homam Ahmed		(substituted on) 72'
FW	7	Ahmed Alaaeldin	(yellow card) 86'	(substituted on) 78'
MF	24	Jassem Gaber		(substituted on) 79'
Manager:
(Spain) Tintín Márquez

GK	21	Mostafa Matar
CB	12	Robert Alexander Melki
CB	18	Kassem El Zein
CB	4	Nour Mansour
RM	6	Hussein Zein
CM	20	Ali Tneich
CM	10	Mohamad Haidar	(yellow card) 51'	(substituted off) 70'
CM	16	Walid Shour		(substituted off) 70'
LM	5	Nassar Nassar		(substituted off) 87'
CF	22	Bassel Jradi		(substituted off) 80'
CF	7	Hassan Maatouk (c)		(substituted off) 70'
Substitutions:
MF	26	Hasan Srour	(yellow card) 80'	(substituted on) 70'
FW	9	Hilal El-Helwe		(substituted on) 70'
FW	11	Omar Chaaban		(substituted on) 70'
FW	24	Gabriel Bitar		(substituted on) 80'
FW	8	Soony Saad		(substituted on) 87'
Manager:
(Montenegro) Miodrag Radulović

Man of the Match:
Akram Afif (Qatar)

Assistant referees:
Anton Shchetinin (Australia)
Ashley Beecham (Australia)
Fourth official:
Ko Hyung-jin (South Korea)
Reserve assistant referee:
Yoon Jae-yeol (South Korea)
Video assistant referee:
Shaun Evans (Australia)
Assistant video assistant referees:
Kate Jacewicz (Australia)

=== China vs Tajikistan ===
This was the sides' first competitive meeting since the 1998 FIFA World Cup qualification phase, a 0–0 draw. Their most recent meeting was a friendly match in 2019, with China securing a 1–0 victory. In fact, China had never lost to Tajikistan in all five of their previous encounters.

The match was mostly dominated by Tajikistan, who nevertheless failed to convert a single chance from their dominant display into a goal. Their best chance came in the 26th minute when Alisher Dzhalilov was left unmarked in the penalty area, but aimed his shot wide of the post. In the 81st minute, however, in one of China's rare attacking opportunities from a corner kick, Zhu Chenjie appeared to give his side a 1–0 lead from a header, but the goal was disallowed by the VAR system after Tyias Browning was judged to have interfered with play from an offside position.

13 January 2024
17:30

China	0–0	Tajikistan
	Report

Abdullah bin Khalifa Stadium, Doha
Attendance: 4,001
Referee: Mohammed Al-Hoaish (Saudi Arabia)

China	Tajikistan

GK	1	Yan Junling
RB	5	Zhang Linpeng (c)
CB	2	Tyias Browning
CB	3	Zhu Chenjie
LB	19	Liu Yang
RM	21	Liu Binbin
CM	26	Wang Qiuming		(substituted off) 58'
CM	6	Wang Shangyuan	(yellow card) 28'
LM	18	Dai Wai Tsun		(substituted off) 72'
CF	7	Wu Lei		(substituted off) 72'
CF	11	Tan Long		(substituted off) 58'
Substitutions:
MF	8	Xu Xin		(substituted on) 58'
FW	9	Zhang Yuning		(substituted on) 58'
MF	23	Lin Liangming		(substituted on) 72'
MF	10	Xie Pengfei		(substituted on) 72'
Manager:
(Serbia) Aleksandar Janković

GK	1	Rustam Yatimov
RB	5	Manuchekhr Safarov
CB	6	Vakhdat Khanonov
CB	2	Zoir Dzhuraboyev
LB	19	Akhtam Nazarov
CM	7	Parvizdzhon Umarbayev (c)	(yellow card) 74'
CM	14	Alisher Shukurov		(substituted off) 89'
RW	13	Amadoni Kamolov		(substituted off) 90+6'
AM	10	Alisher Dzhalilov
LW	17	Ehson Panjshanbe
CF	9	Rustam Soirov		(substituted off) 89'
Substitutions:
MF	20	Alidzhoni Ayni		(substituted on) 89'
FW	22	Shahrom Samiev	(yellow card) 90+4'	(substituted on) 89'
FW	15	Shervoni Mabatshoev		(substituted on) 90+6'
Manager:
(Croatia) Petar Šegrt

Man of the Match:
Liu Yang (China)

Assistant referees:
Khalaf Al-Shammari (Saudi Arabia)
Yasir Al-Sultan (Saudi Arabia)
Fourth official:
Nazmi Nasaruddin (Malaysia)
Reserve assistant referee:
Mohamad Zairul Bin Khalil Tan (Malaysia)
Video assistant referee:
Khalid Al-Turais (Saudi Arabia)
Assistant video assistant referees:
Abdullah Jamali (Kuwait)

=== Lebanon vs China ===
This was the first time the sides faced each other in the Asian Cup. Their most recent encounter dated back to 2009, having played home and away during 2011 AFC Asian Cup qualification, with China emerging victorious in both fixtures. China had never lost against their West Asian counterpart in all five previous meetings, with four wins and one draw.

The opening minutes saw Liu Yang's attempt to deliver a high pass blocked, as no Chinese player managed to capitalize on the opportunity before Lebanon's Maher Sabra cleared the ball with a decisive header in the 19th minute. Lebanon, in turn, launched persistent attacks on China's goal, beginning with Hassan Maatouk's long-range shot in the 24th minute. A counterattack ensued, with Omar Chaaban's shot going just wide of the net in the 34th minute, followed by Khalil Khamis sending a header wide a minute later. In the 44th minute, a well-placed high ball from the left flank by Dai Wai Tsun led to Zhang Yuning's powerful shot, only for Lebanese keeper Mostafa Matar to deny it with a double save. Wu Lei attempted to seize the rebound, but Matar ultimately emerged victorious.

The first half concluded with Maatouk's long-distance attempt for Lebanon in stoppage time, hitting the crossbar of Yan Junling's net. As the second half unfolded, Lebanon continued to test China with long-range shots, including a notable 63rd-minute attempt by Hassan Srour also hitting the crossbar. However, China gradually asserted dominance in the later stages of the half. Despite both teams intensifying their efforts, the match concluded in a goalless draw.

The outcome of the match held significance for China, as it marked an unwanted record of failing to score in three consecutive Asian Cup matches, a feat previously unprecedented for the team in tournament history.

17 January 2024
14:30

Lebanon	0–0	China
	Report

Al Thumama Stadium, Doha
Attendance: 14,137
Referee: Ko Hyung-jin (South Korea)

Lebanon	China

GK	21	Mostafa Matar
CB	13	Khalil Khamis
CB	4	Nour Mansour	(substituted off) 18'
CB	18	Kassem El Zein
RM	6	Hussein Zein
CM	25	Hasan Srour	(substituted off) 90+3'
CM	20	Ali Tneich
LM	3	Maher Sabra
AM	22	Bassel Jradi
CF	11	Omar Chaaban	(substituted off) 90+3'
CF	7	Hassan Maatouk (c)	(substituted off) 71'
Substitutions:
DF	12	Robert Alexander Melki	(substituted on) 18'
MF	10	Mohamad Haidar	(substituted on) 71'
FW	9	Hilal El-Helwe	(substituted on) 90+3'
MF	16	Walid Shour	(substituted on) 90+3'
Manager:
(Montenegro) Miodrag Radulović

GK	1	Yan Junling
RB	5	Zhang Linpeng (c)
CB	2	Tyias Browning
CB	3	Zhu Chenjie
RM	21	Liu Binbin		(substituted off) 71'
CM	8	Xu Xin		(substituted off) 71'
CM	6	Wang Shangyuan
CM	18	Dai Wai Tsun
LM	19	Liu Yang
CF	7	Wu Lei		(substituted off) 66'
CF	9	Zhang Yuning	(yellow card) 30'	(substituted off) 66'
Substitutions:
FW	11	Tan Long		(substituted on) 66'
MF	23	Lin Liangming		(substituted on) 66'
MF	10	Xie Pengfei		(substituted on) 71'
MF	15	Wu Xi		(substituted on) 71'
Manager:
(Serbia) Aleksandar Janković

Man of the Match:
Mostafa Matar (Lebanon)

Assistant referees:
Park Sang-jun (South Korea)
Kim Kyoung-min (South Korea)
Fourth official:
Ilgiz Tantashev (Uzbekistan)
Reserve assistant referee:
Andrey Tsapenko (Uzbekistan)
Video assistant referee:
Kim Jong-hyeok (South Korea)
Assistant video assistant referees:
Kim Hee-gon (South Korea)

=== Tajikistan vs Qatar ===
This was the sides' first meeting in the tournament and their first in any competition for twelve years, having met in 2012 where Tajikistan beat the Qataris 2–1 in a friendly. This was also the first competitive fixture to occur between the two. Qatar had only lost once against the sole debutant of this competition after four matches, with the three other encounters ending in Qatari victories.

Tajikistan made a bright start by applying early pressure on to push Qatar on the defence, however a ball won in the midfield saw Almoez Ali seize the opportunity as he provided a clinical pass for Akram Afif, who then struck the net despite Rustam Yatimov's effort to secure Qatar's lead, which turned out to be the only goal of the match. In the 77th minute, in a failed attack from Qatar, Amadoni Kamolov quickly intercepted but his attempt was prevented by Mohammed Waad and Ahmed Al Ganehi, which he later fell and his feet hit the face of Al Ganehi; later VAR consultation resulted in Kamolov being dismissed from the match at the 81st minute, thus killing any hope of a Tajikistani comeback.

17 January 2024
17:30

Tajikistan	0–1	Qatar
	Report	Afif 17'

Al Bayt Stadium, Al Khor
Attendance: 57,460
Referee: Hiroyuki Kimura (Japan)

Tajikistan	Qatar

GK	1	Rustam Yatimov
RB	5	Manuchekhr Safarov	(yellow card) 35'
CB	6	Vakhdat Khanonov	(yellow card) 81'
CB	2	Zoir Dzhuraboyev
LB	19	Akhtam Nazarov (c)		(substituted off) 82'
RM	13	Amadoni Kamolov	(red card) 81'
CM	7	Parvizdzhon Umarbayev		(substituted off) 82'
CM	14	Alisher Shukurov		(substituted off) 90+1'
LM	17	Ehson Panjshanbe
CF	9	Rustam Soirov		(substituted off) 46'
CF	10	Alisher Dzhalilov		(substituted off) 90+1'
Substitutions:
FW	22	Shahrom Samiev		(substituted on) 46'
FW	15	Shervoni Mabatshoev		(substituted on) 82'
DF	3	Tabrezi Davlatmir		(substituted on) 82'
MF	20	Alidzhoni Ayni	(yellow card) 90+10'	(substituted on) 90+1'
FW	25	Nuriddin Khamrokulov		(substituted on) 90+1'
Manager:
(Croatia) Petar Šegrt

GK	22	Meshaal Barsham
RB	15	Bassam Al-Rawi
CB	5	Tarek Salman
CB	12	Lucas Mendes
LB	4	Mohammed Waad	(yellow card) 60'
DM	20	Ahmed Fatehi	(yellow card) 45+1'	(substituted off) 65'
CM	24	Jassem Gaber		(substituted off) 88'
CM	23	Mostafa Meshaal		(substituted off) 59'
RF	17	Ismaeel Mohammad (c)		(substituted off) 46'
CF	19	Almoez Ali
LF	11	Akram Afif
Substitutions:
FW	25	Ahmed Al Ganehi		(substituted on) 46'
MF	10	Hassan Al-Haydos		(substituted on) 59'
DF	16	Boualem Khoukhi		(substituted on) 65'
DF	2	Ró-Ró	(yellow card) 90+11'	(substituted on) 88'
Manager:
(Spain) Tintín Márquez

Man of the Match:
Akram Afif (Qatar)

Assistant referees:
Jun Mihara (Japan)
Takumi Takagi (Japan)
Fourth official:
Yoshimi Yamashita (Japan)
Reserve assistant referee:
Naomi Teshirogi (Japan)
Video assistant referee:
Jumpei Iida (Japan)
Assistant video assistant referees:
Yusuke Araki (Japan)

=== Qatar vs China ===
This fixture marked the fifth time that the two sides met each other in the Asian Cup. Their most recent meeting in the competition saw the Qatar win 2–0 in 2011, a tournament also held in Qatar. However, the teams' most recent meeting in any competitive fixture occurred during 2018 FIFA World Cup qualification, where China defeated Qatar away 2–1; both matches took place at the Khalifa International Stadium.

The first half saw China aggressively attempt to score against a largely rotated Qatari side, but they failed to do so despite some big opportunities. This proved costly when at the 66th minute, from a perfectly combined corner kick, Hassan Al-Haydos produced a thunderous volley to score the only goal of the match as Qatar confirmed first place in the group with maximum points.

This result meant China had failed to score in four consecutive Asian Cup matches for the first time; following Syria's win over India in Group B, China were eliminated from the tournament, marking their worst-ever performance during participation. Meanwhile, Qatar managed to advance past the group stage for the second consecutive Asian Cup without conceding a goal.

22 January 2024
18:00

Qatar	1–0	China
Al-Haydos 66'	Report

Khalifa International Stadium, Al Rayyan
Attendance: 42,104
Referee: Abdullah Jamali (Kuwait)

Qatar	China

GK	1	Saad Al-Sheeb (c)		(substituted off) 46'
CB	15	Bassam Al-Rawi	(yellow card) 70'
CB	16	Boualem Khoukhi
CB	3	Al-Mahdi Ali Mukhtar
RM	9	Yusuf Abdurisag		(substituted off) 64'
CM	8	Ali Assadalla
CM	6	Abdulaziz Hatem		(substituted off) 46'
CM	23	Mostafa Meshaal		(substituted off) 64'
LM	18	Sultan Al-Brake
CF	7	Ahmed Alaaeldin		(substituted off) 46'
CF	13	Khalid Muneer	(yellow card) 80'
Substitutions:
GK	21	Salah Zakaria		(substituted on) 46'	(substituted off) 63'
FW	25	Ahmed Al Ganehi	(yellow card) 88'	(substituted on) 46'
MF	24	Jassem Gaber		(substituted on) 46'
GK	22	Meshaal Barsham		(substituted on) 63'
MF	10	Hassan Al-Haydos		(substituted on) 64'
FW	11	Akram Afif		(substituted on) 64'
Manager:
(Spain) Tintín Márquez

GK	1	Yan Junling
CB	5	Zhang Linpeng
CB	2	Tyias Browning
CB	3	Zhu Chenjie
RM	21	Liu Binbin	(substituted off) 46'
CM	15	Wu Xi (c)	(substituted off) 67'
CM	6	Wang Shangyuan	(substituted off) 85'
LM	19	Liu Yang
RF	20	Wei Shihao	(substituted off) 67'
CF	9	Zhang Yuning
LF	23	Lin Liangming	(substituted off) 75'
Substitutions:
MF	10	Xie Pengfei	(substituted on) 46'
MF	8	Xu Xin	(substituted on) 67'
MF	7	Wu Lei	(substituted on) 67'
FW	11	Tan Long	(substituted on) 75'
DF	24	Jiang Shenglong	(substituted on) 85'
Manager:
(Serbia) Aleksandar Janković

Man of the Match:
Bassam Al-Rawi (Qatar)

Assistant referees:
Abdulhadi Al-Anezi (Kuwait)
Ahmad Abbas (Kuwait)
Fourth official:
Shaun Evans (Australia)
Reserve assistant referee:
Anton Shchetinin (Australia)
Video assistant referee:
Ahmad Al-Ali (Kuwait)
Assistant video assistant referees:
Adel Al-Naqbi (United Arab Emirates)

=== Tajikistan vs Lebanon ===
This was the sides' first ever meeting.

In the first half's fifth minute of injury time, Shervoni Mabatshoev managed to score for Tajikistan at the near-left post, only to be ruled out for offside. This was later capitalised on by the Lebanese when, from a counterattack, Bassel Jradi produced a brilliant curled effort to record Lebanon's first goal of the competition and give them the lead. However, a brutal foul by Lebanon's Kassem El Zein on Alisher Dzhalilov in the 52nd minute resulted in his dismissal, and Tajikistan then ramped up pressure further, with Dzhalilov scoring in the 70th minute only to be once again ruled offside. Nonetheless, Tajikistan got their reward in the 80th minute when, from a free kick, Parvizdzhon Umarbayev curled the ball into the net to give Tajikistan the equaliser. Empowered by the goal, Tajikistan then went in front when Nuriddin Khamrokulov struck a strong header thanks to a cross from Ehson Panjshanbe in the second minute of stoppage time. Tajikistan thus knocked Lebanon out of the competition and secured second place in their debut group stage campaign, progressing to the last 16.

22 January 2024
18:00

Tajikistan	2–1	Lebanon
Umarbayev 80'; Khamrokulov 90+2'	Report	Jradi 47'

Jassim bin Hamad Stadium, Al Rayyan
Attendance: 11,843
Referee: Mohanad Qasim Sarray (Iraq)

Tajikistan	Lebanon

GK	1	Rustam Yatimov
RB	5	Manuchekhr Safarov
CB	6	Vakhdat Khanonov
CB	2	Zoir Dzhuraboyev	(yellow card) 27'
LB	19	Akhtam Nazarov (c)		(substituted off) 90+12'
RM	15	Shervoni Mabatshoev		(substituted off) 72'
CM	7	Parvizdzhon Umarbayev
CM	14	Alisher Shukurov		(substituted off) 72'
LM	17	Ehson Panjshanbe	(yellow card) 90+7'
CF	9	Rustam Soirov		(substituted off) 72'
CF	10	Alisher Dzhalilov		(substituted off) 88'
Substitutions:
MF	11	Mukhammadzhon Rakhimov		(substituted on) 72'
FW	22	Shahrom Samiev		(substituted on) 72'
FW	25	Nuriddin Khamrokulov		(substituted on) 72'
MF	18	Ruslan Khayloev	(yellow card) 90+12'	(substituted on) 88'
DF	3	Tabrezi Davlatmir		(substituted on) 90+12'
Manager:
(Croatia) Petar Šegrt

GK	21	Mostafa Matar	(yellow card) 77'
CB	13	Khalil Khamis
CB	12	Robert Alexander Melki
CB	18	Kassem El Zein	(red card) 56'
RM	6	Hussein Zein	(yellow card) 90+4'
CM	20	Ali Tneich		(substituted off) 82'
CM	25	Hasan Srour
LM	5	Nassar Nassar		(substituted off) 82'
AM	22	Bassel Jradi		(substituted off) 82'
CF	11	Omar Chaaban		(substituted off) 67'
CF	7	Hassan Maatouk (c)		(substituted off) 58'
Substitutions:
MF	16	Walid Shour		(substituted on) 58'
FW	9	Hilal El-Helwe		(substituted on) 67'
MF	10	Mohamad Haidar		(substituted on) 82'
FW	19	Daniel Kuri		(substituted on) 82'
FW	24	Gabriel Bitar		(substituted on) 82'
Manager:
(Montenegro) Miodrag Radulović

Man of the Match:
Parvizdzhon Umarbayev (Tajikistan)

Assistant referees:
Watheq Al-Swaiedi (Iraq)
Ahmed Al-Baghdadi (Iraq)
Fourth official:
Ahmed Al-Kaf (Oman)
Reserve assistant referee:
Rashid Al-Ghaithi (Oman)
Video assistant referee:
Khalid Al-Turais (Saudi Arabia)
Assistant video assistant referees:
Mohammed Al Hoish (Saudi Arabia)

== Discipline ==
Fair play points would have been used as tiebreakers if the overall and head-to-head records of teams were tied. These were calculated based on yellow and red cards received in all group matches as follows:

- first yellow card: −1 point;
- indirect red card (second yellow card): −3 points;
- direct red card: −3 points;
- yellow card and direct red card: −4 points;

Only one of the above deductions was applied to a player in a single match.

Team	Match 1				Match 2				Match 3				Points
Team	Booked	(yellow card) (yellow-red card)	Sent off (straight red)	(yellow card) (red card)	Booked	(yellow card) (yellow-red card)	Sent off (straight red)	(yellow card) (red card)	Booked	(yellow card) (yellow-red card)	Sent off (straight red)	(yellow card) (red card)	Points
Qatar	2				3				3				–8
China	1				1								–2
Tajikistan	2				3		1		3				–11
Lebanon	2								2		1		–7
