= Tajikistan at the AFC Asian Cup =

National football delegation

Tajikistan has played in one edition of the AFC Asian Cup, in 2023 when they made their debut. The country failed to qualify prior to this edition.

== Record ==
AFC Asian Cup record									Qualification record					
Year	Result	Position	Pld	W	D*	L	GF	GA	Pld	W	D	L	GF	GA
(Hong Kong) 1956 to (Qatar) 1988	Part of the Soviet Union								Part of the Soviet Union					
(Japan) 1992	Did not enter								Did not enter					
(United Arab Emirates) 1996	Did not qualify								2	1	0	1	4	5
(Lebanon) 2000	Did not qualify								3	2	0	1	6	5
(China) 2004	Did not qualify								6	2	2	2	3	5
(Indonesia) (Malaysia) (Thailand) (Vietnam) 2007	Did not enter								Did not enter					
(Qatar) 2011	Did not qualify								2008 AFC Challenge Cup / 2010 AFC Challenge Cup					
(Australia) 2015	Did not qualify								2012 AFC Challenge Cup / 2014 AFC Challenge Cup					
(United Arab Emirates) 2019	Did not qualify								16	5	3	8	25	29
(Qatar) 2023	Quarter-finals	8th	5	1	2	2	3	4	11	6	2	3	19	12
(Saudi Arabia) 2027	Qualification in progress								6	2	2	2	11	7
Total	Quarter-finals	1/7	5	1	2	2	3	4	44	18	9	17	68	63

== 2023 in Qatar ==
=== Group A ===
Pos	Team	Pld	W	D	L	GF	GA	GD	Pts	Qualification
1	Qatar (H)	3	3	0	0	5	0	+5	9	Advance to knockout stage
2	Tajikistan	3	1	1	1	2	2	0	4	Advance to knockout stage
3	China	3	0	2	1	0	1	−1	2	
4	Lebanon	3	0	1	2	1	5	−4	1	

Source: AFC
(H) Hosts
13 January 2024
17:30

China	0–0	Tajikistan
	Report

Abdullah bin Khalifa Stadium, Doha
Attendance: 4,001
Referee: Mohammed Al Hoish (Saudi Arabia)

17 January 2024
17:30

Tajikistan	0–1	Qatar
	Report	Afif 17'

Al Bayt Stadium, Al Khor
Attendance: 57,460
Referee: Hiroyuki Kimura (Japan)

22 January 2024
18:00

Tajikistan	2–1	Lebanon
Umarbayev 80'; Khamrokulov 90+2'	Report	Jradi 47'

Jassim bin Hamad Stadium, Al Rayyan
Attendance: 11,843
Referee: Mohanad Qasim Sarray (Iraq)

=== Knockout stage ===
==== Round of 16 ====
28 January 2024
19:00

Tajikistan	1–1 (a.e.t.)	United Arab Emirates
Hanonov 30'	Report	Al Hammadi 90+5'
Penalties
Nazarov (penalty scored); Hanonov (penalty scored); Panjshanbe (penalty scored); Soirov (penalty scored); Shukurov (penalty scored)	5–3	(penalty scored) Idrees; (penalty missed) Caio; (penalty scored) Lima; (penalty scored) Saleh

Ahmad bin Ali Stadium, Al Rayyan
Attendance: 33,584
Referee: Yusuke Araki (Japan)

==== Quarter-finals ====
2 February 2024
14:30

Tajikistan	0–1	Jordan
	Report	Hanonov 66' (o.g.)

Ahmad bin Ali Stadium, Al Rayyan
Attendance: 35,530
Referee: Fu Ming (China)
