= Yazan Al-Naimat =

Jordanian footballer

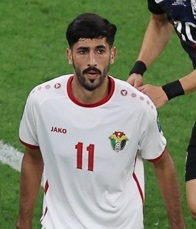
- Al-Naimat playing for Jordan at the 2023 AFC Asian Cup

Personal information
- Full name: Yazan Abdallah Ayed Al-Naimat
- Date of birth: 4 June 1999 (age 27)
- Place of birth: Wadi Al-Seer, Jordan
- Height: 1.80 m (5 ft 11 in)
- Position: Forward

Team information
- Current team: Shabab Al-Ahli
- Number: 11

Youth career
- Sahab

Senior career*
Years	Team	Apps	(Gls)
2018–2021	Sahab	48	(24)
2022–2024	Al-Ahli Doha	44	(15)
2024–2026	Al-Arabi	18	(5)
2026–	Shabab Al-Ahli	0	(0)

International career^{‡}
2020–2021	Jordan U23	11	(4)
2021–	Jordan	70	(26)
Medal record
Representing Jordan
Men's football
AFC Asian Cup
Runner-up	2023 Qatar	Team
FIFA Arab Cup
Runner-up	2025 Qatar	Team
- * Club domestic league appearances and goals as of 17 January 2026 ‡ National team caps and goals as of 12 December 2025

Yazan Abdallah Ayed Al-Naimat (Arabic: يزن عبد الله عايد النعيمات; born 4 June 1999), is a Jordanian professional footballer who plays as a forward for UAE Pro League side Shabab Al-Ahli and the Jordan national team.

== Club career ==
=== Early career ===
Yazan Al-Naimat is a youth product of Sahab. He was promoted to the first team in 2018 and made his league debut at the age of 19. In the 2021 Jordanian Pro League season, he scored 13 goals and was the second highest scorer in the league.

=== Al Ahli ===
In January 2022, despite offers from European clubs, Al-Naimat decided to join Qatar Stars League side Al Ahli, signing a 2.5-year contract for a reported transfer fee of €245,000. He made his debut against Qatar SC on 3 January 2022 and assisted the only goal of the game to help his team win 1–0. One week later, he scored his first goal for Al-Ahli in his team's 2–1 league win against Umm Salal.

=== Al-Arabi ===
On 23 August 2024, Al-Naimat joined Qatar Stars League side Al-Arabi on a free transfer. During the 2025 FIFA Arab Cup, Al-Naimat suffered a rupture of the anterior cruciate ligament (ACL) in his right knee, putting him out of the remainder of the 2025–26 season. Al-Naimat was in negotiations with Al Ahly, but were haltered after the injury.

=== Shabab Al Ahli ===
In May 2026, Jamal Sellami announced that Al-Naimat had joined UAE Pro League side Shabab Al Ahli while recovering from his ACL injury. On 3 July, Al-Faisaly submitted a loan request to have Al-Naimat throughout the 2026–27 season.

== International career ==
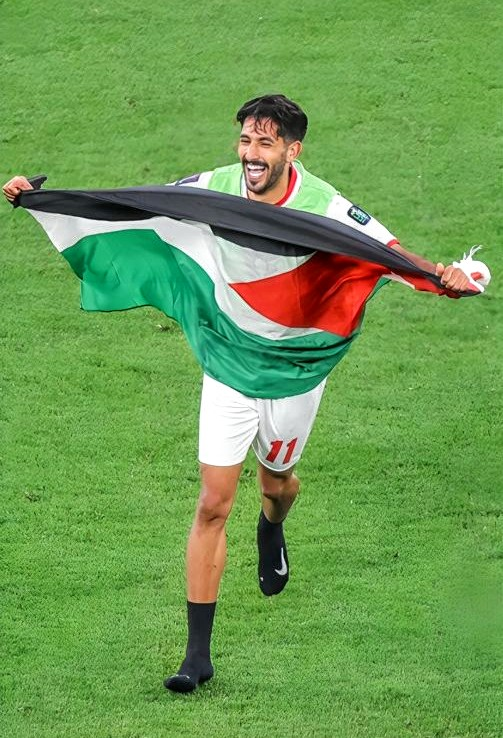
Al-Naimat celebrates carrying the Jordanian flag after winning the semi-finals at the 2023 AFC Asian Cup.

With the Jordan under-23s, Al-Naimat won the 2021 WAFF U-23 Championship. He scored two goals during the tournament, including a goal in the final and was therefore named as the Best player of the tournament.

Yazan Al-Naimat debuted for the Jordan national team in a 2–0 friendly win over Tajikistan on 1 February 2021. He scored his first international goal on 30 March 2021 against Bahrain at the Bahrain National Stadium.

Later in the year, he participated in the 2021 FIFA Arab Cup. Al-Naimat scored two goals in the group stage to help Jordan finish as group runners-up. In the quarter-final game, Al-Naimat scored one more goal but his team were defeated 3–1 by Egypt. Afterwards, he was given the Bronze Boot award.

In January 2024, Al-Naimat took part in the 2023 AFC Asian Cup with Jordan. In the group stage, he scored once in the 2–2 game against South Korea as his team advanced to the next stage. In the round of 16 game against Iraq, he intercepted a pass from the opponent in the 45th minute and raced past the defence before opening the score with a chip shot. The match later ended in a 3–2 win for Jordan. In the semi-finals against South Korea, Al-Naimat helped Jordan take the lead with a goal in the 53rd minute, scoring for the second time against the Taegeuk Warriors in the tournament. Following Musa Al-Taamari's goal in the 66th minute, Jordan won 2–0 and reached the AFC Asian Cup final for the first time in their history. In the final match against Qatar, he scored a goal which equaled the encounter at 1–1, before it ended in a 3–1 defeat.

During the 2026 FIFA World Cup qualification, Al-Naimat scored eight goals, playing a crucial role in his nation's historic first qualification for the 2026 FIFA World Cup. On 12 December 2025, he suffered a rupture of the anterior cruciate ligament (ACL) in his right knee during the FIFA Arab Cup quarter-final match against Iraq. The injury ultimately prevented him from participating in the 2026 FIFA World Cup.

== Career statistics ==
=== Club ===
As of match played 23 November 2025

Appearances and goals by club, season and competition
Club	Season	League			National cup (Note: Includes Amir of Qatar Cup.)		League cup (Note: Includes Qatari Stars Cup.)		Continental		Other (Note: Includes AGCFF Gulf Club Champions League.)		Total	
Club	Season	Division	Apps	Goals	Apps	Goals	Apps	Goals	Apps	Goals	Apps	Goals	Apps	Goals
Sahab	2020	Jordanian Pro League	6	7	—		—		—		—		6	7
Sahab	2021	Jordanian Pro League	9	13	—		—		—		—		9	13
Sahab	Total		15	20	—		—		—		—		15	20
Al Ahli	2021–22	Qatar Stars League	8	2	—		—		—		—		8	2
Al Ahli	2022–23	Qatar Stars League	21	8	1	0	2	0	—		—		24	8
Al Ahli	2023–24	Qatar Stars League	18	5	1	2	1	0	—		—		20	7
Al Ahli	Total		47	15	2	2	3	0	—		—		52	17
Al-Arabi	2024–25	Qatar Stars League	10	2	1	0	—		—		3	0	13	2
Al-Arabi	2025–26	Qatar Stars League	8	3	1	0	1	3	—		—		11	6
Al-Arabi	Total		18	5	2	0	1	3	—		3	0	24	8
Career total			80	40	4	2	4	3	0	0	3	0	91	45

=== International ===
As of match played 12 December 2025

Appearances and goals by national team and year
National team	Year	Apps	Goals
Jordan	2021	16	4
Jordan	2022	10	2
Jordan	2023	9	5
Jordan	2024	20	12
Jordan	2025	14	3
Total		69	26

Scores and results list Jordan's goal tally first, score column indicates score after each Al-Naimat goal.

List of international goals scored by Yazan Al-Naimat
No.	Date	Venue	Opponent	Score	Result	Competition	Ref.
1	30 March 2021	Bahrain National Stadium, Riffa, Bahrain	Bahrain	2–0	2–1	Friendly	
2	7 December 2021	Stadium 974, Doha, Qatar	Palestine	4–1	5–1	2021 FIFA Arab Cup	
3	7 December 2021	Stadium 974, Doha, Qatar	Palestine	5–1	5–1	2021 FIFA Arab Cup	
4	11 December 2021	Al Janoub Stadium, Al Wakrah, Qatar	Egypt	1–0	1–3 (a.e.t.)	2021 FIFA Arab Cup	
5	11 June 2022	Jaber Al-Ahmad International Stadium, Kuwait City, Kuwait	Indonesia	1–0	1–0	2023 AFC Asian Cup qualification	
6	23 September 2022	King Abdullah II Stadium, Amman, Jordan	Syria	2–0	2–0	Friendly	
7	28 March 2023	Al Janoub Stadium, Al Wakrah, Qatar	Philippines	3–0	4–0	Friendly	
8	13 October 2023	Amman International Stadium, Amman, Jordan	Iran	1–2	1–3	2023 Jordan International Tournament	
9	17 October 2023	Amman International Stadium, Amman, Jordan	Iraq	1–0	2–2 (a.e.t.) (3–5 p)	2023 Jordan International Tournament	
10	17 October 2023	Amman International Stadium, Amman, Jordan	Iraq	2–2	2–2 (a.e.t.) (3–5 p)	2023 Jordan International Tournament	
11	16 November 2023	Republican Central Stadium, Dushanbe, Tajikistan	Tajikistan	1–1	1–1	2026 FIFA World Cup qualification	
12	5 January 2024	Thani bin Jassim Stadium, Al Rayyan, Qatar	Qatar	1–1	2–1	Friendly	
13	20 January 2024	Al Thumama Stadium, Doha, Qatar	South Korea	2–1	2–2	2023 AFC Asian Cup	
14	29 January 2024	Khalifa International Stadium, Al Rayyan, Qatar	Iraq	1–0	3–2	2023 AFC Asian Cup	
15	6 February 2024	Ahmad bin Ali Stadium, Al Rayyan, Qatar	South Korea	1–0	2–0	2023 AFC Asian Cup	
16	10 February 2024	Lusail Stadium, Doha, Qatar	Qatar	1–1	1–3	2023 AFC Asian Cup	
17	26 March 2024	Amman International Stadium, Amman, Jordan	Pakistan	2–0	7–0	2026 FIFA World Cup qualification	
18	6 June 2024	Amman International Stadium, Amman, Jordan	Tajikistan	2–0	3–0	2026 FIFA World Cup qualification	
19	10 September 2024	Kuala Lumpur Stadium, Kuala Lumpur, Malaysia	Palestine	1–0	3–1	2026 FIFA World Cup qualification	
20	10 September 2024	Kuala Lumpur Stadium, Kuala Lumpur, Malaysia	Palestine	2–1	3–1	2026 FIFA World Cup qualification	
21	15 October 2024	Amman International Stadium, Amman, Jordan	Oman	1–0	4–0	2026 FIFA World Cup qualification	
22	15 October 2024	Amman International Stadium, Amman, Jordan	Oman	3–0	4–0	2026 FIFA World Cup qualification	
23	19 November 2024	Jaber Al-Ahmad International Stadium, Kuwait City, Kuwait	Kuwait	1–0	1–1	2026 FIFA World Cup qualification	
24	14 March 2025	Amman International Stadium, Amman, Jordan	North Korea	1–0	1–1	Friendly	
25	14 November 2025	Hammadi Agrebi Stadium, Tunis, Tunisia	Tunisia	1–0	2–3	Friendly	
26	3 December 2025	Al Bayt Stadium, Al Khor, Qatar	United Arab Emirates	2–1	2–1	2025 FIFA Arab Cup	

== Honours ==
Al-Arabi

- Qatari Stars Cup runner-up: 2024–25

Jordan U23

- WAFF U-23 Championship: 2021

Jordan

- AFC Asian Cup runner-up: 2023

Individual

- FIFA Arab Cup Bronze Boot: 2021
- WAFF U-23 Championship Best player: 2021
- AFC Asian Cup Team of the Tournament: 2023
