= Jassem Gaber =

Qatari footballer (born 2002)

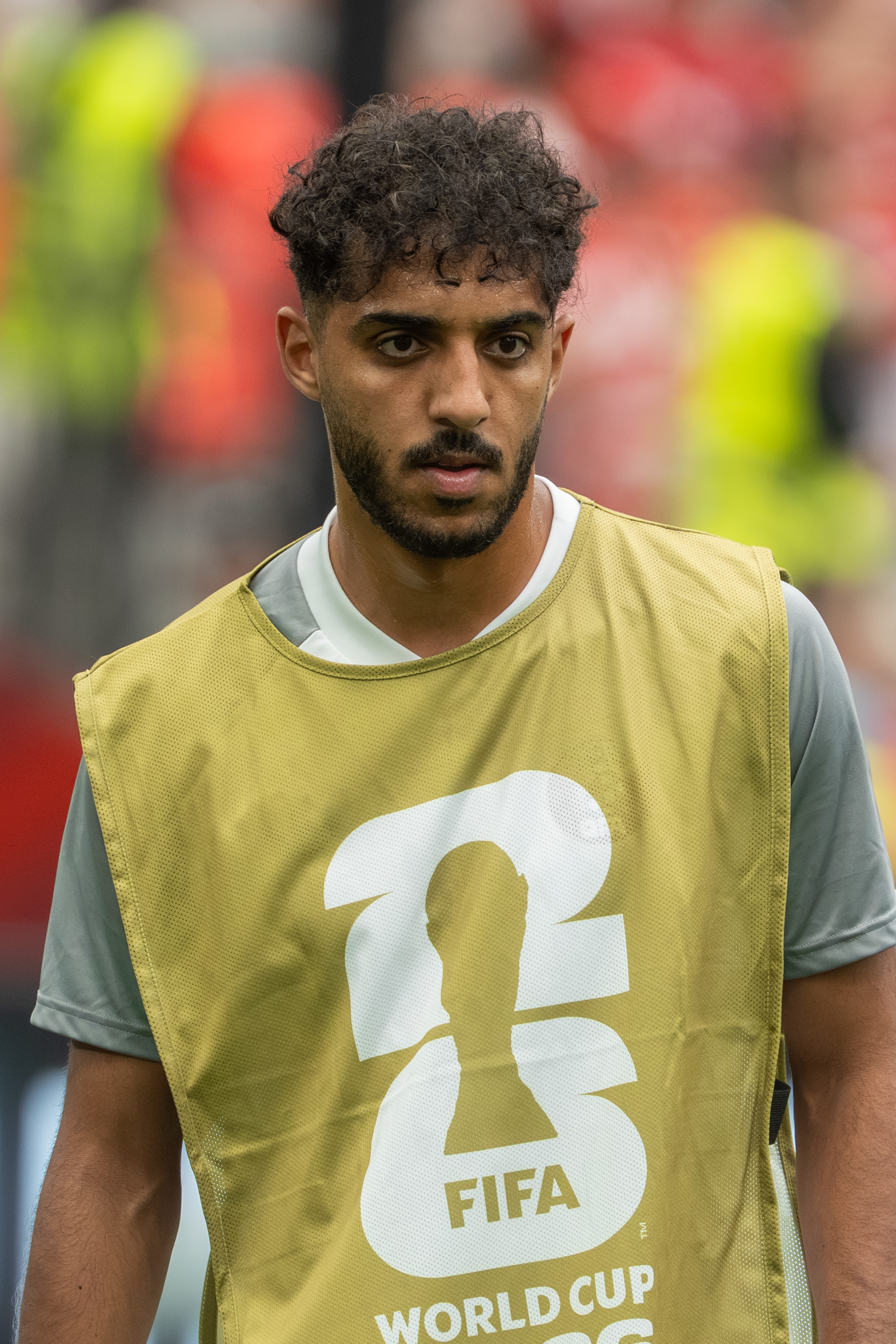
- Gaber with Qatar in 2026

Personal information
- Full name: Jassem Gaber El-Sayed Abdulsalam
- Date of birth: 20 February 2002 (age 24)
- Place of birth: Doha, Qatar
- Height: 1.82 m (6 ft 0 in)
- Positions: Centre-back; defensive midfielder

Team information
- Current team: Al-Rayyan
- Number: 8

Senior career*
Years	Team	Apps	(Gls)
2019–2025	Al-Arabi	86	(2)
2025–	Al-Rayyan	0	(0)

International career^{‡}
2021	Qatar U23		
2023–	Qatar	30	(1)
Medal record
Representing Qatar
Men's Football
AFC Asian Cup
Winner	2023 Qatar
- * Club domestic league appearances and goals as of 10 December 2024 ‡ National team caps and goals as of 27 December 2024

Jassem Gaber El-Sayed Abdulsalam (Arabic: جَاسِم جَابِر السَّيِّد عَبْد السَّلَام; born 20 February 2002) is a Qatari professional footballer who plays as a centre-back or defensive midfielder for Qatar Stars League club Al-Rayyan and the Qatar national team.

== Club career ==
In January 2020, Gaber signed a four-year contract to remain with Al-Arabi until the 2024 season.

In January 2022, Gaber was included in the IFFHS AFC Under-20 Team of the Year for 2021.

== International career ==
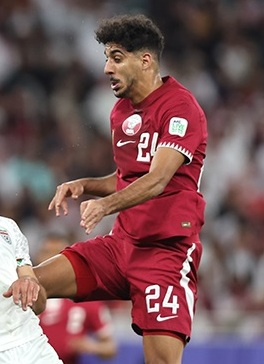
Gaber with Qatar at the 2023 AFC Asian Cup.

Gaber made his debut for Qatar national team in 2022. He was selected for the 2022 FIFA World Cup that was hosted in his home country Qatar.

In January 2024, Gaber was named in Qatar's 26-men squad for the 2023 AFC Asian Cup. In the semi-finals game against Iran, he scored the 1–1 equalizer goal from a shot outside the penalty area, as the match later ended in a 3–2 win for Qatar, which qualified them to the final.

Gaber was selected for the 26-man squad for the 2026 FIFA World Cup on 27 May 2026.

== Statistics ==
=== International ===
List of international goals scored by Jassem Gaber
No.	Date	Venue	Opponent	Score	Result	Competition
1.	7 February 2024	Al Thumama Stadium, Doha, Qatar	Iran	1–1	3–2	2023 AFC Asian Cup

== Honours ==
Al-Arabi

- Qatar FA Cup: 2022
- Emir of Qatar Cup: 2023

Qatar

- AFC Asian Cup: 2023
