= Ma Ning (referee) =

Chinese football referee (born 1979)

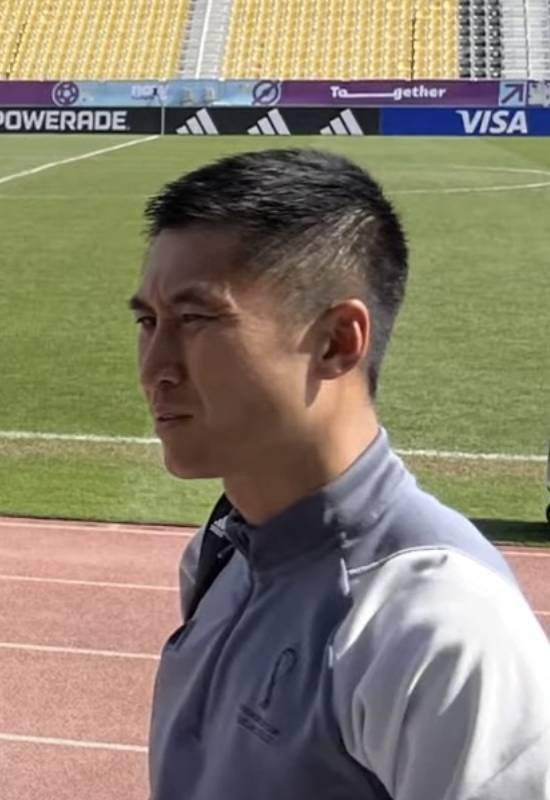
- Ma Ning in 2022
- Born: 20 June 1979 (age 47); Fuxin, Liaoning, China
- Other occupation: Teacher

Domestic
Years	League	Role
2010–	Chinese Super League	Referee

International
Years	League	Role
2011–	FIFA listed	Referee

Ma Ning
- Simplified Chinese: 马宁
- Traditional Chinese: 馬寧
Transcriptions
Standard Mandarin
- Hanyu Pinyin: Mǎ Níng
- IPA: [ma nǐŋ]

Ma Ning (Chinese: 马宁; born 14 June 1979) is a Chinese football referee. He has been a full international referee for FIFA since 2011. He also teaches at the Nanjing Sport Institute. Known for a stern, uncompromising officiating style, Ma was nicknamed "Card Master" by fans.

== Career ==
On 23 February 2019, it was announced that Ma Ning had been hired by CFA to become one of the professional referees in China.

On 19 May 2022, Ma was selected as one of the 36 referees for the 2022 FIFA World Cup, becoming the second Chinese referee to achieve this since Lu Jun in 2002.

On 21 August 2022, during a Chinese Super League game between Wuhan Yangtze River and Henan Songshan Longmen, Ma was deliberately knocked over by Songshan Longmen striker Henrique Dourado, who was subsequently sent off for violent conduct. The game finished 2–2. Five days later, the Chinese FA announced a 12-month suspension to Dourado, which was the most severe penalty in the history of the Chinese Super League.

On 2 February 2023, at the 2022 FIFA Club World Cup, Ma officiated a match between Al Ahly and Auckland City, with Al Ahly winning 3–0.

On 8 February 2024, Ma Ning was appointed to take charge of the 2023 AFC Asian Cup final between Jordan and Qatar in Doha on 10 February 2024.

On 14 October 2025, Ma was appointed as one of the 14 referees for the 2025 FIFA Arab Cup, having thus far overseen the matches between Mauritania and Kuwait, Morocco and Comoros, and the United Arab Emirates and Kuwait.

Ma was one of the 52 referees to officiate matches at the 2026 FIFA World Cup, being the only Chinese referee since Lu Jun to be the central referee. On 20 June 2026, Ma debuted as the referee at the 2026 FIFA World Cup Group E match between Ecuador and Curacao, and issued six yellow cards.

== Controversies ==
=== 2015 Chinese Super League: Shanghai Port F.C. vs Shanghai Shenhua F.C. ===
On 9 May 2015, Ma drew widespread controversy as he sent off three Shenhua players in a Shanghai derby between Shanghai SIPG and Shanghai Shenhua in the Chinese Super League; the game finished 5–0 to SIPG.

=== 2025–26 AFC Champions League Elite: Al Ittihad vs Machida Zelvia ===
On 17 April 2026, in the AFC Champions League Elite quarter finals, Ma Ning would controversially call off an Al Ittihad goal against Machida Zelvia in the 86th minute, as well as not call many fouls that were against Al Ittihad, drawing Controversy from the Al Ittihad Fanbase, as the game would end 1–0 in favour of Machida Zelvia, eliminating Al Ittihad from the competition.

== Record ==
2019 AFC Asian Cup – United Arab Emirates
Date	Match	Venue	Round
9 January 2019	Qatar – Lebanon	Al Ain	Group stage

2023 AFC Asian Cup – Qatar
Date	Match	Venue	Round
15 January 2024	South Korea – Bahrain	Al Rayyan	Group stage
29 January 2024	Qatar – Palestine	Al Khor	Round of 16
3 February 2024	Iran – Japan	Al Rayyan	Quarter-finals
10 February 2024	Jordan – Qatar	Lusail	Asian Cup Final

2024-25 AFC Champions League Elite
Date	Match	Venue	Round
5 November 2024	(Saudi Arabia) Al Nassr – (United Arab Emirates) Al Ain	Riyadh	League stage

2025-26 AFC Champions League Elite
Date	Match	Venue	Round
16 September 2025	(United Arab Emirates) Shabab Al Ahli – (Iran) Tractor	Dubai	League stage
20 October 2025	(Saudi Arabia) Al Ahli – (Qatar) Al Gharafa	Jeddah	League stage
10 February 2026	(Japan) Sanfrecce Hiroshima – (Malaysia) Johor Darul Ta'zim	Hiroshima	League stage
16 February 2026	(Saudi Arabia) Al Hilal – (United Arab Emirates) Al Wahda	Riyadh	League stage
13 April 2026	(Saudi Arabia) Al Ahli – (Qatar) Al Duhail	Jeddah	Round of 16
17 April 2026	(Japan) Machida Zelvia – (Saudi Arabia) Al Ittihad	Jeddah	Quarter-finals

2026 FIFA World Cup – Canada–Mexico–United States
Date	Match	Venue	Round
20 June 2026	Ecuador – Curaçao	Kansas City	Group stage

== In popular culture ==
Ma Ning has secured sponsorships from Chinese brands Lenovo, Hisense and Mengniu. Since starting his social media account, he has garnered over 200,000 followers.

Preceded by (Jordan) Adham Makhadmeh	AFC Champions League First-leg Final referee 2018 (China) Ma Ning	Succeeded by Incumbent
Preceded by (Uzbekistan) Ravshan Irmatov	AFC Asian Cup final match referees 2023 (China) Ma Ning	Succeeded by Most recent
