= Ahmed Al-Ganehi =

Qatari footballer (born 2000)

Personal information
- Full name: Ahmed Mohammed Al-Ganehi
- Date of birth: 22 September 2000 (age 26)
- Place of birth: Doha, Qatar
- Height: 1.75 m (5 ft 9 in)
- Position: Winger

Team information
- Current team: Al-Rayyan
- Number: 22

Youth career
- Aspire Academy

Senior career*
Years	Team	Apps	(Gls)
2019–2026	Al-Gharafa	123	(21)
2026–	Al-Rayyan	4	(0)

International career^{‡}
2018	Qatar U19	1	(0)
2021–2022	Qatar U23	11	(2)
2023–	Qatar	13	(1)
Medal record
Representing Qatar
Men's Football
AFC Asian Cup
Winner	2023 Qatar
- * Club domestic league appearances and goals as of 17 January 2026 ‡ National team caps and goals as of 14:09, 2 January 2024 (UTC)

Ahmed Mohammed Al-Ganehi (Arabic: أَحْمَد مُحَمَّد الْجَانِحِيّ) (born 22 September 2000) is a Qatari professional footballer who plays as a winger for Qatar Stars League club Al-Rayyan and the Qatar national team.

== Career ==
Al-Ganehi started his career at Al-Gharafa and is a product of the Aspire Academy's youth system. On 23 February 2019, Al Ganehi made his professional debut for Al-Gharafa against Al-Duhail in the Pro League, replacing Ahmed Alaaeldin.

== International goals ==
=== Qatar U23 ===
No.	Date	Venue	Opponent	Score	Result	Competition
1.	1 December 2022	Milliy Stadium, Tashkent, Uzbekistan	Iran	1–0	1–1	2022 AFC U-23 Asian Cup

=== Senior team ===
Scores and results list Jordan's goal tally first.

No.	Date	Venue	Opponent	Score	Result	Competition
1.	20 March 2025	Jassim bin Hamad Stadium, Doha, Qatar	North Korea	2–0	5–1	2026 FIFA World Cup qualification

== Honours ==
Al-Gharafa

- Amir of Qatar Cup: 2024–25, 2025–26

Qatar

- AFC Asian Cup: 2023
