= Mohammed Waad =

Qatari footballer (born 1999)

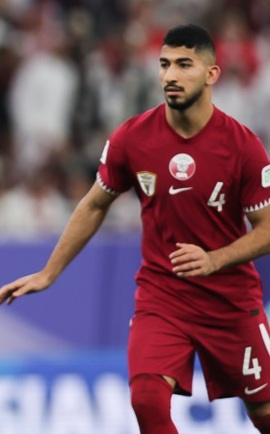
- Waad with Qatar at the 2023 AFC Asian Cup

Personal information
- Full name: Mohammed Waad Abdulwahab Jadoua Al Bayati
- Date of birth: 18 September 1999 (age 27)
- Place of birth: Baghdad, Iraq
- Height: 1.83 m (6 ft 0 in)
- Position: Midfielder

Team information
- Current team: Al-Shamal (on loan from Al Sadd)
- Number: 73

Youth career
- Al-Sadd

Senior career*
Years	Team	Apps	(Gls)
2016–	Al-Sadd	67	(2)
2018	→ Cultural Leonesa (loan)	1	(0)
2019	→ Al Ahli (loan)	6	(1)
2019–2020	→ Al-Wakrah (loan)	11	(1)
2026–	→ Al-Shamal (loan)	0	(0)

International career^{‡}
2018–2019	Qatar U20	8	(1)
2020–2021	Qatar U23	3	(0)
2020–	Qatar	36	(0)
Medal record
Men's football
Representing Qatar
AFC Asian Cup
Winner	2023 Qatar
FIFA Arab Cup
Third place	2021 Qatar
- * Club domestic league appearances and goals as of 2 May 2023 (UTC) ‡ National team caps and goals as of 7 January 2024 (UTC)

Mohammed Waad Abdulwahab Jadoua Al Bayati (Arabic: مُحَمَّد وَعْد عَبْد الْوَهَّاب جَدُوع الْبَيَاتِيّ; born 18 September 1999) is a footballer who plays for Al-Shamal, on loan from Al-Sadd. Born in Iraq, he represented the Qatar national team.

== Club career ==
Waad began his professional career with Al-Sadd SC in 2016. Between 2018 and 2020, he was loaned to Cultural Leonesa, Al-Ahli SC and Al-Wakrah SC. In February 2020, he returned to Al Sadd SC.

== Honours ==
Al-Sadd

- Qatar Stars League: 2020–21, 2021–22
- Emir of Qatar Cup: 2017, 2020, 2021
- Qatar Cup: 2017, 2021
- Qatari Stars Cup: 2019–20

Qatar

- AFC Asian Cup: 2023
