= Nuriddin Khamrokulov =

Tajikistani professional football player

Personal information
- Full name: Nuriddin Akhatovich Khamrokulov
- Date of birth: 25 October 1999 (age 27)
- Place of birth: Qurghonteppa, Tajikistan
- Height: 1.76 m (5 ft 9 in)
- Position: Forward

Team information
- Current team: Vakhsh Bokhtar
- Number: 30

Senior career*
Years	Team	Apps	(Gls)
2016-2018	Barkchi		
2019-2022	Khatlon	45	(17)
2023	Regar-TadAZ	19	(3)
2024	Vakhsh Bokhtar	9	(3)
2024	Khosilot Farkhor	10	(3)
2025–	Vakhsh Bokhtar	23	(6)

International career^{‡}
2021–	Tajikistan	15	(2)
- * Club domestic league appearances and goals as of 16 March 2026 ‡ National team caps and goals as of 07:45, 29 January 2024 (UTC)

Nuriddin Akhatovich Khamrokulov (Tajik: Нуриддин Хамрокулов, Russian: ‌Нуриддин Хамрокулов, born 25 October 1999) is a Tajikistani professional football player for Vakhsh Bokhtar and the Tajikistan national team.

== Career ==
=== International ===
Khamrokulov made his senior team debut on 24 May 2021 against Iraq, coming on as a 59th minute substitute for Parvizdzhon Umarbayev.

== Career statistics ==
=== International ===
Tajikistan national team
Year	Apps	Goals
2021	2	0
2022	5	0
2023	5	1
2024	3	1
Total	15	2

Statistics accurate as of match played 28 January 2024

=== International goals ===
Scores and results list Tajikistan's goal tally first.

No.	Date	Venue	Opponent	Score	Result	Competition
1.	11 June 2023	Pakhtakor Central Stadium, Tashkent, Uzbekistan	Turkmenistan	1–1	1–1	2023 CAFA Nations Cup
2.	22 January 2024	Jassim bin Hamad Stadium, Al Rayyan, Qatar	Lebanon	2–1	2–1	2023 AFC Asian Cup

== Honors ==
=== International ===
==== Tajikistan ====
- King's Cup: 2022
- Merdeka Tournament: 2023
