= Tintín Márquez =

Spanish footballer and manager

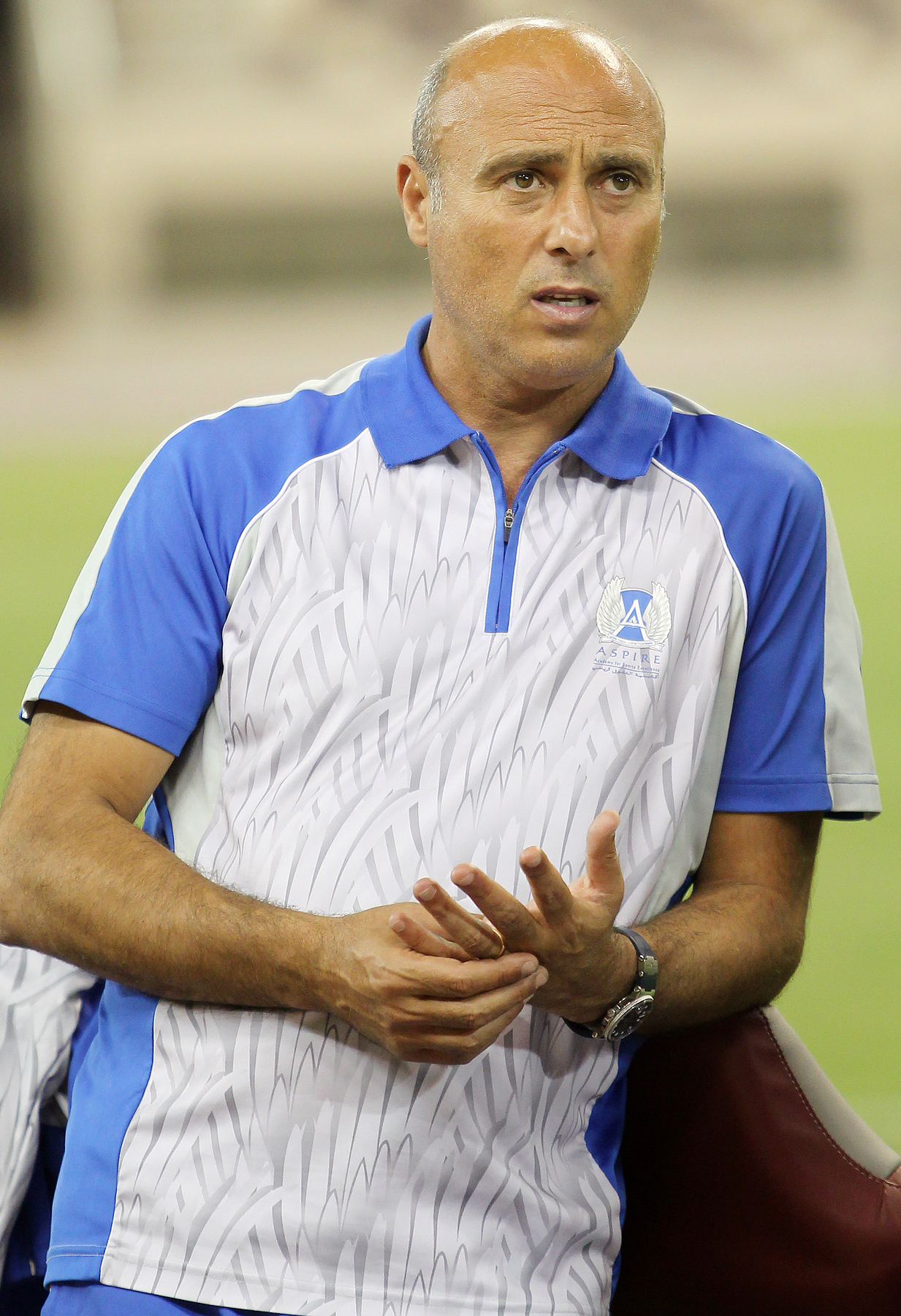
- Márquez in 2012

Personal information
- Full name: Bartolomé Márquez López
- Date of birth: 7 January 1962 (age 64)
- Place of birth: Barcelona, Spain
- Height: 1.76 m (5 ft 9 in)
- Position: Attacking midfielder

Youth career
- Martinenc

Senior career*
Years	Team	Apps	(Gls)
1980	Martinenc		
1980–1988	Español	140	(29)
1980–1981	→ Sant Andreu (loan)		
1981–1982	→ Sabadell (loan)	20	(1)
1988–1994	Figueres	192	(47)
1994–1995	Europa	27	(1)
Total		379	(78)

International career
1982–1983	Spain U21	2	(0)

Managerial career
- 1997–1998: Europa
- 1998–2002: Espanyol (youth)
- 2002–2004: Espanyol B
- 2004–2008: Espanyol (assistant)
- 2008: Espanyol
- 2009–2010: Castellón
- 2012–2015: Eupen
- 2017: Sint-Truiden
- 2018–2023: Al-Wakrah
- 2023–2024: Qatar
- 2025–2026: Qatar SC
Medal record
Men's football
Representing Qatar (as manager)
AFC Asian Cup
Winner	2023 Qatar
- * Club domestic league appearances and goals

Bartolomé "Tintín" Márquez López (born 7 January 1962) is a Spanish former professional footballer who played as an attacking midfielder. He is currently a manager.

His career was closely associated to Espanyol, as both a player and coach.

== Playing career ==
Born in Barcelona, Catalonia, Márquez was nicknamed after the comic book character Tintin for his similar hairstyle. He signed for Español in early 1980, and played exclusively in his native region during his 15-year professional career. After two loans, at Sant Andreu and Sabadell, he was definitely promoted to the first team in the 1982–83 season, making his La Liga debut on 4 September 1982 by coming on as a late substitute in a 1–0 home win against Racing de Santander.

Márquez played six full campaigns with the Pericos, always in the top flight. His best year was 1985–86, when he scored ten goals in 32 matches to help his team to the 11th position, including a hat-trick on 20 April 1986 in a 5–3 home victory over Barcelona; he was also part of the squad that reached the final of the 1987–88 UEFA Cup, but took no part in the competition after falling out of favour with manager Javier Clemente.

Márquez signed with Figueres in the 1988 off-season, going on to spend five of his six years in the Segunda División and appear in the promotion playoffs in 1992. He retired at the age of 33, after a spell in the Segunda División B with Europa.

== Coaching career ==
Márquez began working as a manager in 1997, his first stop being with his last club in the Tercera División. He won the Copa Catalunya that year, defeating Barcelona in the final.

On 26 May 1998, Márquez returned to Espanyol – the organisation changed its denomination three years later– going on to be in charge of its youth and reserve teams the following six years. He subsequently served as an assistant to the main squad, first under Miguel Ángel Lotina then Ernesto Valverde.

In the summer of 2008, Márquez was appointed at the first team after Valverde left for Olympiacos. However, on 30 November, after four consecutive losses, he was relieved of his duties.

In 2012, after roughly six months with Spanish second-tier side Castellón, and a spell at the Aspire Academy in Qatar, Márquez signed for Eupen in the Belgian Second Division. On 31 March 2015, he was fired for undisclosed reasons, when the team were in third place.

Márquez was appointed coach of Sint-Truidense in June 2017 following Ivan Leko's departure for Club Brugge, but was dismissed after 53 days – just two games into the new season – over irreconcilable differences.

In early 2018, Márquez returned to Qatar to manage Second Division side Al-Wakrah, being beaten to promotion by compatriot José Murcia's Al Shahaniya in his first season. A year later, his team won the division, achieving promotion to the Qatar Stars League.

On 6 December 2023, Márquez was appointed at the Qatar national team on a temporary basis, replacing Carlos Queiroz. He led them to victory at the 2023 AFC Asian Cup held on home soil, resulted in the extension of the contract to the 2026 FIFA World Cup.

However, on 11 December 2024, after a series of subpar performances during the 2026 World Cup qualifiers, mainly a 5–0 loss away to the United Arab Emirates, Márquez was sacked. He was replaced by his assistant Luis García.

Márquez joined Qatar top-flight Qatar SC on 12 June 2025, qualifying for the GFF Gulf Club Champions League at the end of his debut campaign. In October 2026, he was dismissed due to poor results.

== Managerial statistics ==
As of match played 19 November 2024

Managerial record by team and tenure
Team	Nat	From	To	Record							
Team	Nat	From	To	G	W	D	L	GF	GA	GD	Win %
Espanyol B	(Spain)	19 October 2002	30 June 2004	76	29	17	30	111	108	+3	38.16
Espanyol	(Spain)	3 June 2008	30 November 2008	15	4	4	7	15	21	−6	26.67
Castellón	(Spain)	14 October 2009	6 April 2010	24	5	8	11	22	32	−10	20.83
Eupen	(Belgium)	6 July 2012	31 March 2015	112	57	27	28	192	117	+75	50.89
Sint-Truiden	(Belgium)	1 July 2017	7 August 2017	2	1	0	1	3	4	−1	50.00
Al-Wakrah	(Qatar)	31 January 2018	6 December 2023	117	43	28	46	178	187	−9	36.75
Qatar	(Qatar)	6 December 2023	11 December 2024	19	12	3	4	35	26	+9	63.16
Career total				365	151	87	127	556	495	+61	41.37

== Honours ==
Qatar

- AFC Asian Cup: 2023
