= Ahmed Fathy (Qatari footballer) =

Qatari footballer (born 1993)

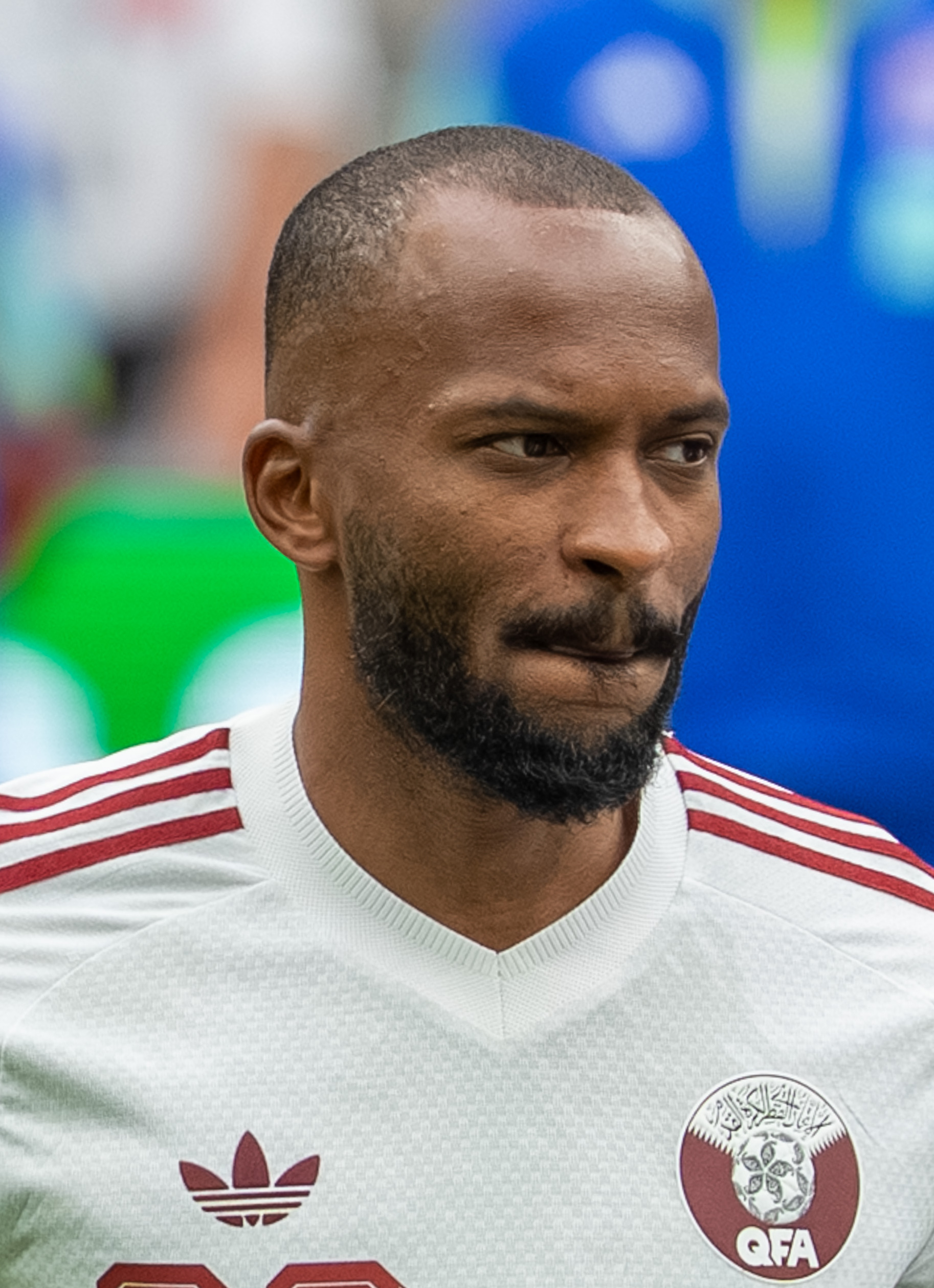
- Fathy with Qatar in 2026

Personal information
- Full name: Ahmed Fathy Mansi Abdulla
- Date of birth: 25 January 1993 (age 33)
- Place of birth: Aswan, Egypt
- Height: 1.71 m (5 ft 7 1/2 in)
- Position: Midfielder

Team information
- Current team: Al-Arabi
- Number: 8

Senior career*
Years	Team	Apps	(Gls)
2012–	Al Arabi	233	(5)

International career
2015	Qatar U23	3	(0)
2017–	Qatar	40	(0)
Medal record
Representing Qatar
Men's football
AFC Asian Cup
Winner	2019 UAE	Team
Winner	2023 Qatar	Team
- * Club domestic league appearances and goals as of 17 January 2026

Ahmed Fathy Mansi Abdulla (also spelled Fatehi, Arabic: أحمد فتحي, born 25 January 1993) is a professional footballer who plays as a midfielder for Al-Arabi. Born in Egypt, he represents the Qatar national team.

== Career ==
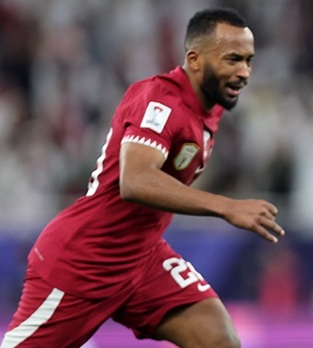
Fathy with Qatar at the 2023 AFC Asian Cup.

Fathy began his professional career with Al-Arabi in 2012. After several years living in Qatar, he was granted Qatari citizenship and represented the Qatar national team. He was a member of the 2019 AFC Asian Cup and 2023 AFC Asian Cup winning team.

Fathy was selected for the 26-man squad for the 2026 FIFA World Cup on 27 May 2026.

== Honours ==
Al-Arabi

- Qatar FA Cup: 2022
- Emir of Qatar Cup: 2023

Qatar

- AFC Asian Cup: 2019, 2023

Individual

- AFC Asian Cup Team of the Tournament: 2023
