= Meshaal Barsham =

Qatari footballer (born 1998)

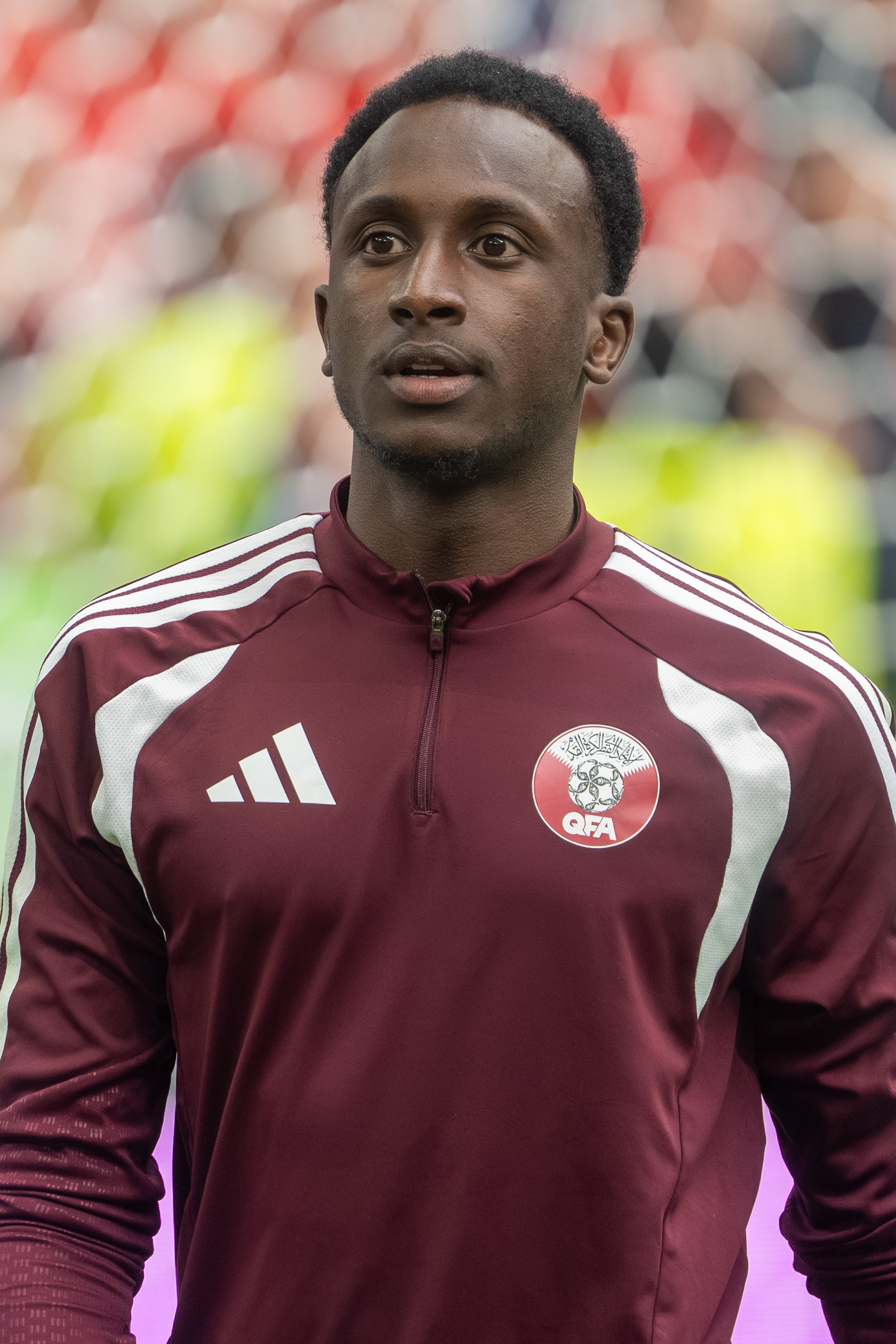
- Barsham with Qatar in 2026

Personal information
- Full name: Meshaal Essa Barsham
- Date of birth: 14 February 1998 (age 28)
- Place of birth: Doha, Qatar
- Height: 1.80 m (5 ft 11 in)
- Position: Goalkeeper

Team information
- Current team: Al Sadd
- Number: 22

Youth career
- Al Sadd

Senior career*
Years	Team	Apps	(Gls)
2017–	Al-Sadd	99	(0)

International career^{‡}
2017–2021	Qatar U23	2	(0)
2021–	Qatar	57	(0)
Medal record
Men's football
Representing Qatar
AFC Asian Cup
Winner	2023 Qatar
FIFA Arab Cup
Third place	2021 Qatar
- * Club domestic league appearances and goals as of 17 January 2026 ‡ National team caps and goals as of 17 January 2026

Meshaal Essa Barsham (Arabic: مَشْعَل عِيسَى بَرْشَم; born 14 February 1998) is a Qatari professional footballer who plays as a goalkeeper for Al Sadd. Born in Doha, he plays for Qatar national team.

== Club career ==
=== Al Sadd ===
On 27 August 2018, in the 2018 AFC Champions League quarter-finals, Barsham started in Al Sadd's 3–1 away win against Esteghlal.

== International career ==
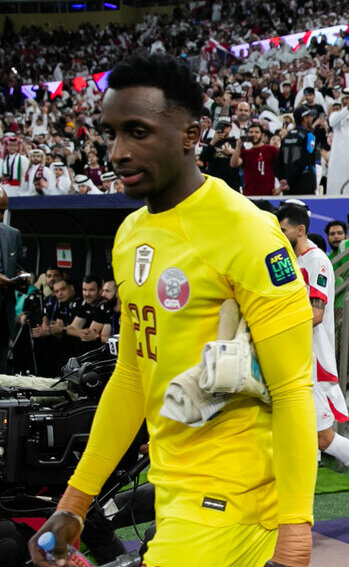
Barsham with Qatar at the 2023 AFC Asian Cup.

Barsham was selected for the 26-man squad for the 2026 FIFA World Cup on 27 May 2026.

== Personal life ==
He is the younger brother of Olympic gold high jump medalist Mutaz Barsham, and Muamer Aissa Barsham.

== Honours ==
Al-Sadd

- Sheikh Jassim Cup: 2019
- Qatari Stars Cup: 2019–20
- Emir of Qatar Cup: 2020, 2021
- Qatar Cup: 2020, 2021
- Qatar Stars League: 2018–19, 2020–21, 2021–22

Qatar

- AFC Asian Cup: 2023

Individual

- AFC Asian Cup Golden Glove: 2023
- AFC Asian Cup Team of the Tournament: 2023
- Qatar Stars League Team of the Year: 2023–24
