= 2017 CISM World Football Cup squads =

The 2017 CISM World Football Cup is an international football tournament hosted by Oman from 15 to 28 January 2017.

== Group A ==
=== Oman ===
Coach: (Oman) Muhannad Saeed Al-Adwi

No.	Pos.	Player	Date of birth (age)	Caps	Club
	GK	Faiz Al-Rushaidi	19 July 1988 (aged 28)		(Oman) Al-Nasr
	GK	Riyadh Subait	1 January 1995 (aged 22)		(Oman) Dhofar
	GK	Anwar Al-Alawi			(Oman) Suwaiq
	DF	Mohammed Al-Musalami	27 April 1990 (aged 26)		(Oman) Fanja
	DF	Mohammed Al-Balushi	27 August 1989 (aged 27)		Free
	DF	Nader Awad Basheer			(Oman) Dhofar
	DF	Saad Suwaid Al-Oraimi	23 October 1984 (aged 32)		(Oman) Al-Orouba
	DF	Saad Al-Mukhaini	6 September 1987 (aged 29)		(Oman) Al-Orouba
	DF	Basil Al-Rawahi	25 September 1993 (aged 23)		(Oman) Fanja
	MF	Mahmoud Al-Mushaifri	14 January 1993 (aged 24)		(Oman) Suwaiq
	MF	Mohammed Al-Maashari	4 December 1990 (aged 26)		(Oman) Fanja
	MF	Harib Al-Saadi	1 February 1990 (aged 26)		(Oman) Suwaiq
	MF	Saud Al-Farsi	3 April 1993 (aged 23)		(Oman) Al-Orouba
	MF	Jameel Al-Yahmadi	4 January 1994 (aged 23)		(Oman) Al-Shabab
	MF	Yassen AL-Shiyadi	5 February 1994 (aged 22)		(Oman) Suwaiq
	MF	Mohsin Al-Khaldi	1 January 1992 (aged 25)		(Oman) Saham
	MF	Juma Darwish	29 September 1984 (aged 32)		(Oman) Al-Nasr
	FW	Al-Abd Al-Nofali			(Oman) Suwaiq
	FW	Mohammed Taqi	12 September 1985 (aged 31)		(Oman) Bosher
	FW	Abdul Aziz Al-Muqbali (c)	23 April 1989 (aged 27)		Kuwait SC
	FW	Qasim Said	20 April 1989 (aged 27)		(Oman) Al-Nasr
	FW	Saeed Obaid Al Abdulsalam	16 November 1991 (aged 25)		(Oman) Al-Khabourah

=== Guinea ===
Coach: (Guinea) Hamidou Camara

No.	Pos.	Player	Date of birth (age)	Caps	Club
	GK	M’Bemba Camara			(Guinea) ASFAG
	GK	Alhassane Boffa Camara			(Guinea) ASFAG
	DF	Abdoulaye Naby Camara			(Guinea) ASFAG
	DF	Cheick Aly Sylla			(Guinea) ASFAG
	DF	Ibrahima Camara (c)	1 January 1985 (aged 32)		(Guinea) ASFAG
	DF	Oumar Ben Barry	11 April 1995 (aged 21)		(Guinea) ASFAG
	MF	Moussa Sylla	31 July 1988 (aged 28)		(Guinea) ASFAG
	MF	Mory Kanté			(Guinea) ASFAG
	MF	Ousmane Bangoura			(Guinea) ASFAG
	MF	Sékou Camara			(Guinea) ASFAG
	FW	Ibrahima Kassory Camara			(Guinea) ASFAG
	FW	Ibrahima Sory Keita	16 June 1994 (aged 22)		(Guinea) ASFAG
		Aliou Barry			(Guinea) ASFAG
		Adboulaye Sow			(Guinea) ASFAG
		Thierno Souleymane Diallo			(Guinea) ASFAG
		Moussa Cissé			(Guinea) ASFAG
		Almamy Kolintin Camara			(Guinea) ASFAG
		Sékou Mari Kaba			(Guinea) ASFAG

=== Bahrain ===
Coach: (Czech Republic) Miroslav Soukup

No.	Pos.	Player	Date of birth (age)	Caps	Club
	GK	Sayed Mohammed Abbas	25 August 1985 (aged 31)		(Bahrain) Manama Club
	GK	Mohamed Adel Hasan	20 September 1996 (aged 20)		(Bahrain) Manama Club
	GK	Mahboob Al-Dosari	4 October 1995 (aged 21)		(Bahrain) Al-Riffa
	DF	Waleed Al Hayam	3 February 1991 (aged 25)		(Bahrain) Al-Muharraq
	DF	Abdulla Yaser	27 March 1988 (aged 28)		(Bahrain) Al-Muharraq
	MF	Sayed Dhiya Saeed	17 July 1992 (aged 24)		(Bahrain) Al-Riffa
	MF	Mohammad Al-Hardan	6 October 1997 (aged 19)		(Bahrain) Al-Muharraq
	MF	Ahmed Mohammed			(Bahrain) Sitra
	MF	Sayed Redha Isa			(Bahrain) Malkiya
	MF	Abbas Al-Sari	11 September 1992 (aged 24)		(Bahrain) Manama Club
	MF	Isa Muthanna	5 April 1991 (aged 25)		(Bahrain) Manama Club
	MF	Kamel Al Aswad	8 April 1994 (aged 22)		(Bahrain) Al-Riffa
	MF	Sayed Mahdi Naser			
	FW	Ismail Abdullatif	11 September 1986 (aged 30)		(Qatar) Al Ahli Doha
	FW	Abdulla Yusuf Helal	12 June 1993 (aged 23)		(Bahrain) East Riffa
	FW	Ebrahim Hasan	5 February 1989 (aged 27)		(Bahrain) Al-Hidd
	FW	Mohamed Al Romaihi	9 September 1990 (aged 26)		(Bahrain) Al-Hidd
	FW	Mohammed Tayeb Al Alawi	13 October 1989 (aged 27)		(Bahrain) Al-Riffa
	FW	Ali Madan			
	FW	Sayed Mohammed Husein			(Bahrain) Al-Riffa
		Ail Al-Aytham			
		Naser Sayed Mohsin			
		Mohammed Mohrefi			
		Ahmed Abdulla			

=== France ===
Coach: (France) Jeremy Chapeleur

No.	Pos.	Player	Date of birth (age)	Caps	Club
	GK	Quentin Accart			(France) Jonquières
	GK	Nolan Denis	17 January 1992 (aged 24)		(France) Castres
	DF	Karl Kaimba	2 January 1990 (aged 27)		(France) Vierzon FC
	DF	Hibourahim Dahalane	22 July 1994 (aged 22)		(France) Yzeure
	DF	Jérémy Lagarde			(France) Bassin d'Arcachon
	DF	Kévin Picaudou	12 November 1990 (aged 26)		(France) Sapeurs Pompiers
	DF	Gérald Pradal	8 December 1982 (aged 34)		(France) La Suze
	DF	Emmanuel Jalma			(France) Orvault
	DF	Julien Pouvereau	15 February 1989 (aged 27)		(France) Marmande 47
	MF	Aurélien Rouault			(France) Olympique Saumur
	MF	Julien Gallo			(France) 1er Canton
	MF	Yann Oggad	2 November 1990 (aged 26)		(France) Sézanne
	MF	Cédric Rossignol			(France) Bonchamp
	MF	Adrien Coulomb	4 October 1990 (aged 26)		(France) Marignane Gignac
	MF	Julien Dupuis	30 July 1984 (aged 32)		(France) ES Pennoise
	MF	Abdelkader Mihoubi			(France) Thierville
	MF	William Friedrich	26 March 1994 (aged 22)		
	FW	Anthony Corte			(France) US Châtel
	FW	Jawad El Hajri	1 November 1979 (aged 37)		(France) Yzeure
	FW	Kévin Dumontant	21 June 1985 (aged 31)		(France) Angers
	FW	Jérémy Pannier			(France) Chassieu Décines
	FW	Romain Magnier	6 August 1987 (aged 29)		(France) Blériot-Plage
		Geoffroy Noizet			
		Kamel Boulkenafet			
		Julien Quehen			

== Group B ==
=== Algeria ===
Coach: (Algeria) Mohamed Boutadjine

No.	Pos.	Player	Date of birth (age)	Caps	Club
	GK	Farid Bouzidi	11 April 1990 (aged 26)		(Algeria) RC Kouba
	GK	Farid Chaâl	3 July 1994 (aged 22)		(Algeria) MC Alger
	GK	Hicham Ayachi	1 January 1993 (aged 24)		(Algeria) MO Constantine
	DF	Chamseddine Harrag	10 August 1992 (aged 24)		(Algeria) USM El Harrach
	DF	Ahmed Cheheima	8 April 1992 (aged 24)		(Algeria) JSM Béjaïa
	DF	Houari Ferhani	11 February 1993 (aged 23)		(Algeria) JS Kabylie
	DF	Saâdi Redouani (c)	18 March 1995 (aged 21)		(Algeria) JS Kabylie
	DF	Ishak Bouda	3 January 1993 (aged 24)		(Algeria) RC Relizane
	DF	Maâmar Youcef	3 October 1989 (aged 27)		(Algeria) ASO Chlef
	DF	Nasser Maddour	6 August 1990 (aged 26)		(Algeria) GC Mascara
	DF	Mohamed Amine Madani	20 March 1992 (aged 24)		(Algeria) USM El Harrach
	DF	Sofiane Khadir	3 May 1994 (aged 22)		(Algeria) MO Béjaïa
	MF	Abdelouahab Guenifi	2 January 1990 (aged 27)		(Algeria) CA Batna
	MF	Malik Raiah	20 September 1992 (aged 24)		(Algeria) JS Kabylie
	MF	Bilal Tarikat	12 June 1991 (aged 25)		(Algeria) CR Belouizdad
	MF	Faouzi Yaya	21 September 1989 (aged 27)		(Algeria) MO Béjaïa
	MF	Zakaria Draoui	12 February 1994 (aged 22)		(Algeria) CR Belouizdad
	FW	Takfarinas Ouchen	28 October 1993 (aged 23)		(Algeria) Olympique Médéa
	FW	Khalil Semahi	22 January 1995 (aged 21)		(Algeria) ASO Chlef
	FW	Mohamed Amine Hamia	6 October 1989 (aged 27)		(Algeria) Olympique Médéa
	FW	Abderrahmane Meziane	7 March 1994 (aged 22)		(Algeria) USM Alger
	FW	Ismail Belkacemi	24 June 1993 (aged 23)		(Algeria) MO Béjaïa
	FW	Walid Ardji	7 September 1995 (aged 21)		(Algeria) NA Hussein Dey

=== Germany ===
Coach: (Germany) Oliver Unsöld

No.	Pos.	Player	Date of birth (age)	Caps	Club
	GK	Andreas Förster	20 January 1989 (aged 27)		(Germany) SC Idar-Oberstein
	GK	Sven Steingräber	8 November 1987 (aged 29)		(Germany) TSV Schilksee
	GK	Mario Wörmann	26 June 1991 (aged 25)		(Germany) FC Schwalmstadt
	DF	Felix Bollow	8 December 1989 (aged 27)		(Germany) TSV Friedland
	DF	Christian Houy			(Germany) SC Reisbach
	DF	Uwe Schlottner	21 April 1990 (aged 26)		(Germany) FC Unterföhring
	DF	Erik Birkhahn	19 June 1990 (aged 26)		(Germany) TSV Lichtenau
	DF	Andreas Dick	25 April 1989 (aged 27)		(Germany) Bonner SC
	DF	Denis Rolke	16 June 1988 (aged 28)		(Germany) FC Strausberg
	MF	Martin Pett	12 October 1986 (aged 30)		(Germany) Hansa Rostock
	MF	Philipp Pönisch	20 May 1986 (aged 30)		(Germany) TuS Sachsenhausen
	MF	Holger Wulff	19 December 1990 (aged 26)		(Germany) Kickers Emden
	MF	Sascha Brinker	23 August 1982 (aged 34)		(Germany) FC Gievenbeck II
	MF	Christian Freudenberg	2 September 1986 (aged 30)		(Germany) FV Dresden 06
	MF	Artur Zielke	7 February 1993 (aged 23)		(Germany) Hannoverscher SC
	FW	Jan-Niklas Kersten	10 November 1995 (aged 21)		(Germany) Leher TS Bremerhaven
	FW	Patrick Piesker	16 March 1988 (aged 28)		(Germany) TSV Travemünde
	FW	Thim Scherer			(Germany) SV Gersweiler
	FW	Florian Stahl	23 November 1985 (aged 31)		(Germany) SV Eutin
		Alexander Davidenko			
		Paul Graf			
		Joseph Thomson			
		Alexander Heb			

=== Iran ===
Coach: (Iran) Gholam Hossein Peyrovani

No.	Pos.	Player	Date of birth (age)	Caps	Club
	GK	Saleh Khalilazad	17 April 1990 (aged 26)		(Iran) Fajr Sepasi Shiraz
	GK	Milad Ahmadian	30 May 1993 (aged 23)		(Iran) Fajr Sepasi Shiraz
	DF	Ali Moslanejad			(Iran) Fajr Sepasi Shiraz
	DF	Hamed Heydari			(Iran) Fajr Sepasi Shiraz
	DF	Reza Moradi			(Iran) Fajr Sepasi Shiraz
	DF	Ehsan Joudaki	16 March 1992 (aged 24)		(Iran) Fajr Sepasi Shiraz
	DF	Iman Salimi	1 June 1993 (aged 23)		(Iran) Fajr Sepasi Shiraz
	DF	Mohammad Javad Jalali			(Iran) Fajr Sepasi Shiraz
	MF	Mohsen Fayazbakhsh			(Iran) Fajr Sepasi Shiraz
	MF	Mehdi Karimian	28 August 1980 (aged 36)		(Iran) Fajr Sepasi Shiraz
	FW	Ali Gholamrezapour			(Iran) Fajr Sepasi Shiraz
	FW	Milad Saremi			(Iran) Fajr Sepasi Shiraz

=== North Korea ===
Coach: (North Korea) Kim Chung

No.	Pos.	Player	Date of birth (age)	Caps	Club
	DF	Sim Hyon-jin	1 January 1991 (aged 26)		(North Korea) Sobaeksu
	DF	Ri Kwang-hyok	17 August 1987 (aged 29)		(North Korea) Kyonggongop
	DF	Ri Hyong-mu	4 November 1991 (aged 25)		(North Korea) Sobaeksu
	DF	Kwon Chung-hyok	21 January 1994 (aged 22)		(North Korea) April 25
	DF	Kim Chol-bom	16 July 1994 (aged 22)		(North Korea) Sobaeksu
	MF	An Il-bom	2 December 1990 (aged 26)		(North Korea) Sobaeksu
	MF	Han Song-hyok	11 December 1987 (aged 29)		(North Korea) Hwaebul
	MF	Kim Jong-chol			
	MF	O Hyok-chol	2 August 1991 (aged 25)		(North Korea) April 25
	MF	Ri Hyong-jin	19 July 1993 (aged 23)		(North Korea) April 25
	MF	So Kyong-jin	8 January 1994 (aged 23)		(North Korea) South Hamgyong
	FW	Kim Ju-song	15 October 1993 (aged 23)		(North Korea) April 25
	FW	Rim Chol-min	24 November 1990 (aged 26)		
	FW	Om Chol-song	12 November 1992 (aged 24)		(North Korea) April 25
	FW	So Hyon-uk	17 April 1992 (aged 24)		(North Korea) April 25
		An Tae-song			
		Pak Jin-myong			
		Yun Kwang-il			
		Son Pyong-il			
		Won Song			

== Group C ==
=== Ireland ===
Coach: (Republic of Ireland) Thomas Hewitt

No.	Pos.	Player	Date of birth (age)	Caps	Club
	DF	Craig Shortt	13 October 1991 (aged 25)		(Republic of Ireland) Birr Town
	DF	Sean Gannon	11 July 1991 (aged 25)		(Republic of Ireland) Dublin Central
	DF	Chris Kenny	4 May 1990 (aged 26)		(Republic of Ireland) Sligo Rovers
	DF	Aidan Friel	15 January 1991 (aged 25)		(Republic of Ireland) Longford Town
	MF	Craig Wall	17 March 1991 (aged 25)		(Republic of Ireland) Freebooters Kilkenny
	MF	Darren Kelly	23 July 1985 (aged 31)		(Republic of Ireland) Cherry Orchard
	MF	Keith Duffy	27 December 1992 (aged 24)		(Republic of Ireland) Ballina Town
	MF	Ross MacCarthy	10 May 1993 (aged 23)		(Republic of Ireland) Youghal United
	MF	David Stack			(Republic of Ireland) Cobh Wanderers
	MF	Michael O'Shea	14 November 1987 (aged 29)		(Republic of Ireland) Cobh Wanderers
	MF	Shane Dempsey	19 May 1989 (aged 27)		(Republic of Ireland) Wexford Youths
	FW	Sean Guerins	29 November 1994 (aged 22)		(Republic of Ireland) BT Harps
	FW	Philip Gorman	7 August 1981 (aged 35)		(Republic of Ireland) Waterford
	FW	Ricky Fox	12 February 1988 (aged 28)		(Republic of Ireland) Shamrock Rovers
		Derek Walsh			(Republic of Ireland) Usher Celtic
		Stephen Whelan			(Republic of Ireland) St Paul’s Artane
		Ian Lordan			(Republic of Ireland) Greenwood
		Richard Barber			(Republic of Ireland) St James Gate
		Kenneth Deegan			(Republic of Ireland) Newbridge Town
		Mark Horgan			(Republic of Ireland) Avondale
		David Sweeney			(Republic of Ireland) Ballincollig

=== Mali ===
Coach: (Mali) Bréhima Diallo

No.	Pos.	Player	Date of birth (age)	Caps	Club
	GK	Komandjan Keïta	6 October 1990 (aged 26)		(Mali) USFAS Bamako
	GK	Moussa Diarra	8 January 1988 (aged 29)		(Mali) USFAS Bamako
	GK	Drissa Konaré			(Mali) USFAS Bamako
	DF	Kalifa Doumbia	10 September 1989 (aged 27)		(Mali) USFAS Bamako
	DF	Moussa Touré (footballer, born 1991)	14 October 1991 (aged 25)		(Mali) USFAS Bamako
	DF	Mohamed Minta	11 August 1992 (aged 24)		(Mali) USFAS Bamako
	DF	Mamadou Maguiraga	28 September 1993 (aged 23)		(Mali) USFAS Bamako
	DF	Chiaka Dembélé	23 April 1984 (aged 32)		(Mali) USFAS Bamako
	DF	Naman Doumbia	14 July 1997 (aged 19)		(Senegal) Aspire AFD
	DF	Bourama Doumbia	3 October 1997 (aged 19)		(Mali) USFAS Bamako
	DF	Ali Diallo	15 May 1997 (aged 19)		(Mali) USFAS Bamako
	MF	Aboubacar Diabaté	7 May 1985 (aged 31)		(Mali) USFAS Bamako
	MF	Amadou Diallo	14 November 1982 (aged 34)		(Mali) USFAS Bamako
	MF	Fousseyni Dembélé	13 December 1995 (aged 21)		(Mali) USFAS Bamako
	MF	Salif Diakité	17 April 1995 (aged 21)		(Mali) USFAS Bamako
	MF	Bakary Haïdara			(Mali) USFAS Bamako
	FW	Boubacar Dembélé	7 March 1986 (aged 30)		(Mali) USFAS Bamako
	FW	Adama Traoré	1 January 1989 (aged 28)		(Mali) USFAS Bamako
	FW	Moussa Diallo	24 January 1993 (aged 23)		(Mali) USFAS Bamako
	FW	Boubacar Traoré	24 May 1998 (aged 18)		(Ghana) Dreams FC
		Sambou Sissoko			
		Sadio Coulibaly			
		Namory Koné			

=== Qatar ===
Coach: (Qatar) Abdulqadir Al-Meghaissib

No.	Pos.	Player	Date of birth (age)	Caps	Club
	GK	Saud Al Hajiri	19 July 1986 (aged 30)		(Qatar) Al-Rayyan
	GK	Adama Bamba			
	MF	Ibrahim Jamal Abdulfattah	16 August 1988 (aged 28)		Qatar SC
	MF	Ahmed Khamis	12 March 1987 (aged 29)		
	MF	Luke Ndifon			
	MF	Hilal Mohammed Ibrahim	25 March 1993 (aged 23)		(Qatar) Umm Salal
	FW	Abdoul-Ahad Ngom			
	FW	Ahmed Salama	5 February 1981 (aged 35)		(Qatar) Al-Khaburah
		Ramon Anderson	17 September 1994 (aged 22)		
		Omar Ali			
		Amine Khatim			
		Mohammed Talbi			
		John Iroha			
		Jean Moreira			
		Wendel dos Santos			
		Ibrahim Doumbia			
		Luis Costa			
		Abdullah Al-Haddad			
		Justice Odoi			
		Mahmud Hasan			
		Mamadou Diallo			
		Ismail Jamal			
		Bréhima Keïta			
		Amadou Traoré			
		Jonathan Silva			
		Michel Barros			

=== United States ===
Coach: (United States) Derrick Weyand

No.	Pos.	Player	Date of birth (age)	Caps	Club
	DF	Andy Hyres			(United States) Oly Town Artesians
	DF	Caleb Downey			(United States) Arena FC
	DF	David Schill	30 October 1983 (aged 33)		
	DF	Kevin Rossillion			(United States) MIT FC
	MF	Angel Vallejo			
	MF	Hector Arellano			
	MF	Kevin Durr	13 March 1991 (aged 25)		(United States) Colorado Springs Switchbacks
	MF	Kevin Villanueva			(United States) Ramapo College RoadRunners
	MF	Martin Sanchez			
	FW	Alexander Wilson	13 December 1991 (aged 25)		
		Alexander Figueroa			
		Anthony O'Connor			(United States) Meade United
		Benjamin Latimer			
		Devonte Ecford			(United States) Belvoir
		Edward Pinnell			
		Gabriel Jaramillo			
		Jonathan Mayo			
		Jose Guillan			
		Joseph Karslo			

== Group D ==
=== Egypt ===
Coach: (Egypt) Mohamed Omar

No.	Pos.	Player	Date of birth (age)	Caps	Club
	GK	Emad El Sayed	6 April 1986 (aged 30)		(Egypt) Tala'ea El-Gaish
	GK	Mohamed Bassam	25 December 1990 (aged 26)		(Egypt) Tala'ea El-Gaish
	GK	El-Hany Soliman	1 November 1984 (aged 32)		(Egypt) Al-Ittihad Alexandria
	DF	Mahmoud "El-Winsh" Hamdy	1 June 1995 (aged 21)		(Egypt) Zamalek SC
	DF	Salah Soliman	20 January 1990 (aged 26)		(Egypt) ENPPI
	DF	Mohamed Nagieb	13 January 1983 (aged 34)		(Egypt) Al-Ahly
	DF	Mohamed Tarek	5 May 1990 (aged 26)		(Egypt) Petrojet
	DF	Hazem Emam	7 September 1988 (aged 28)		(Egypt) Al-Ittihad Alexandria
	DF	Ragab Bakar	5 April 1989 (aged 27)		(Egypt) Smouha
	DF	Asem Salah	27 March 1990 (aged 26)		(Egypt) Raja Marsa Matruh
	MF	Hesham Shehata	21 October 1991 (aged 25)		(Egypt) Al-Ittihad Alexandria
	MF	Mahmoud Kaoud	27 August 1988 (aged 28)		(Egypt) ENPPI
	MF	Hossam Ashour	9 March 1986 (aged 30)		(Egypt) Al-Ahly
	MF	Mohamed Rizk	25 January 1988 (aged 28)		(Egypt) Tala'ea El-Gaish
	MF	Amr El Monoufy	1 June 1988 (aged 28)		(Egypt) Smouha
	MF	Ahmed Tawfik	1 October 1991 (aged 25)		(Egypt) Zamalek SC
	MF	Nour El-Sayed	9 January 1984 (aged 33)		(Egypt) Al-Ittihad Alexandria
	MF	Mohamed Ashraf	10 March 1993 (aged 23)		(Egypt) Tala'ea El-Gaish
	MF	Ahmed Eid	15 May 1980 (aged 36)		(Egypt) Tala'ea El-Gaish
	FW	Amr Marey	1 April 1992 (aged 24)		(Egypt) ENPPI
	FW	Amr Gamal	4 August 1991 (aged 25)		(Egypt) Al-Ahly
	FW	Ahmed Raouf	15 September 1982 (aged 34)		(Egypt) Al-Masry
	FW	Ahmed El Sheikh	9 September 1992 (aged 24)		(Egypt) Misr Lel-Makkasa
	FW	Hossam "Paulo" Salama	15 November 1983 (aged 33)		(Egypt) Zamalek SC

=== Poland ===
Coach: (Poland) Tomasz Mucha

No.	Pos.	Player	Date of birth (age)	Caps	Club
	GK	Kamil Ulman	21 April 1983 (aged 33)		(Poland) Stilon Gorzów
	GK	Andrzej Szreiber	3 August 1984 (aged 32)		(Poland) Sparta Brodnica
	GK	Błażej Kokosiński	20 December 1983 (aged 33)		(Poland) MKS Przasnysz
	DF	Adrian Kochanek	29 July 1989 (aged 27)		(Poland) Pogoń Lębork
	DF	Przemysław Kostuch	16 September 1988 (aged 28)		(Poland) GKS Przodkowo
	DF	Dawid Łodyga	4 November 1986 (aged 30)		(Poland) Vineta Wolin
	DF	Hubert Molski	8 February 1991 (aged 25)		(Poland) Płomień Ełk
	DF	Janusz Szkarapat	16 November 1981 (aged 35)		(Poland) Twardy Świętoszów
	DF	Dariusz Piechowiak	30 September 1986 (aged 30)		(Poland) Promień Żary
	MF	Krystian Chruścicki	28 October 1983 (aged 33)		(Poland) Twardy Świętoszów
	MF	Jacek Bochnia	2 November 1991 (aged 25)		(Poland) Karkonosze Jelenia Góra
	MF	Damian Kosiński	13 April 1989 (aged 27)		(Poland) Stradom Częstochowa
	MF	Mateusz Łuczak	13 March 1990 (aged 26)		(Poland) Gryf Wejherowo
	MF	Krzysztof Matuszak	16 October 1981 (aged 35)		(Poland) Jarota Jarocin
	MF	Marek Niewiada	22 July 1980 (aged 36)		(Poland) Vineta Wolin
	MF	Paweł Rakowski	22 May 1986 (aged 30)		(Poland) Leśnik Manowo
	MF	Konrad Rokicki	22 May 1989 (aged 27)		(Poland) Leśnik Manowo
	FW	Damian Formela	22 February 1991 (aged 25)		(Poland) Bytovia Bytów
	FW	Dominik Maziarz	16 June 1989 (aged 27)		(Poland) Zorza Dobrzany
	FW	Konrad Romańczyk	9 March 1986 (aged 30)		(Poland) Gryf Polanów
	FW	Mateusz Wachowiak	1 May 1989 (aged 27)		(Poland) Pogoń Lębork
	FW	Marcina Żeno	22 April 1984 (aged 32)		(Poland) Orzeł Międzyrzecz

=== Canada ===
Coach: (Canada) Marcelo Plala

No.	Pos.	Player	Date of birth (age)	Caps	Club
	GK	Matthew Hogg			
	GK	Stuart Ayres			(Canada) Comox Valley United
	DF	Brian Best			
	DF	Ivan Yarruk			
	DF	John McMichael			
	DF	Christopher Schenk			(Canada) Ottawa United
	DF	Dominique Gonthier			
	DF	Patrick Pacheco			(Canada) Ottawa United
	MF	Devin Tarrant			
	MF	Shawn Carroll-Ouellette	4 December 1993 (aged 23)		(Canada) FC Royal
	MF	Jermaine Burrell			(Canada) Durham United
	MF	David Bitten			(Canada) Formation Halifax
	MF	Stephen Sabadoz			
	MF	Graeme Curran	2 April 1996 (aged 20)		
	MF	Ashton Vaz			
	MF	Stuart Ireson			(Canada) SC Hellas
	FW	Karl Russell			
	FW	Karim Benariba			(Canada) El Ahly
	FW	Alexander Ruhe-Lischke	9 August 1987 (aged 29)		(Canada) Toronto Lynx
	FW	Richard Boyle			

=== Syria ===
Coach: (Syria) Anas Makhlouf

No.	Pos.	Player	Date of birth (age)	Caps	Club
	GK	Ahmad Madnia	1 January 1990 (aged 27)		(Syria) Tishreen
	GK	Shaher Al-Shakir	1 April 1993 (aged 23)		(Syria) Al-Jaish
	GK	Ali Mariama	28 November 1992 (aged 24)		(Syria) Al-Jaish
	DF	Zakaria Al-Kadoor	1 January 1985 (aged 32)		(Syria) Al-Jaish
	DF	Hussain Shaib			(Syria) Al-Jaish
	DF	Abd Al Naser Hasan	28 October 1990 (aged 26)		(Iraq) Naft Al-Janoob
	DF	Abd Al-Kareem Fateh	1 January 1990 (aged 27)		(Syria) Al-Fotuwa
	DF	Muayad Al-Khouli	1 January 1993 (aged 24)		(Syria) Al-Jaish
	MF	Bashar Abu-Khashrif			(Syria) Al-Majd
	MF	Sameer Bilal	1 January 1988 (aged 29)		(Syria) Al-Jaish
	MF	Izzeddin Awad			(Syria) Al-Jaish
	MF	Bahaa Al-Asadi	29 May 1994 (aged 22)		(Syria) Al-Jaish
	MF	Osama Omari	10 January 1992 (aged 25)		(Syria) Al-Wahda
	FW	Husam Bawadkji	1 January 1986 (aged 31)		(Syria) Al-Jaish
	FW	Abd Al-Malek Anezan			(Syria) Al-Jaish
	FW	Bahaa Karout	16 January 1991 (aged 25)		(Syria) Al-Jaish
	FW	Salim Sabakji	10 January 1993 (aged 24)		(Syria) Al-Jaish
	FW	Mohammed Hamadko	10 May 1986 (aged 30)		(Syria) Al-Jaish
	FW	Abd Al-Rahman Barakat			
	FW	Mohammed Al Wakid	6 October 1985 (aged 31)		(Syria) Al-Jaish
