= 2025 FIFA Arab Cup Group B =

Association football tournament group stage

The Group B of the 2025 FIFA Arab Cup was one of the four groups of competing nations in the 2025 FIFA Arab Cup, taking place from 2 December to 8 December 2025. It consisted of Morocco, Saudi Arabia, Oman and Comoros.

The top two teams, Morocco and Saudi Arabia, advanced to the quarter-finals.

== Teams ==
Draw position	Team	Finals appearance	Last appearance	Previous best performance	FIFA Rankings	
Draw position	Team	Finals appearance	Last appearance	Previous best performance	April 2025 (Note: The rankings of April 2025 were used for seeding for the final draw.)	November 2025
B1	Morocco	5th	2021	Winners (2012)	12	11
B2	Saudi Arabia	8th	2021	Winners (1998, 2002)	58	60
B3	Oman	3rd	2021	Quarter-finals (2021)	77	79
B4	Comoros	1st	—N/a	—N/a	105	108

== Standings ==
Pos	Team	Pld	W	D	L	GF	GA	GD	Pts	Qualification
1	Morocco	3	2	1	0	4	1	+3	7	Advance to knockout stage
2	Saudi Arabia	3	2	0	1	5	3	+2	6	Advance to knockout stage
3	Oman	3	1	1	1	3	3	0	4	
4	Comoros	3	0	0	3	3	8	−5	0	

Source: FIFA
Rules for classification: Tiebreakers

In the quarter-finals:

- The winners of Group B, Morocco, advanced to play the runners-up of Group A, Syria.
- The runners-up of Group B, Saudi Arabia, advanced to play the winners of Group A, Palestine.

== Matches ==
=== Morocco vs Comoros ===
2 December 2025
15:00

Morocco	3–1	Comoros
Bouftini 5'; Tissoudali 11'; El Berkaoui 45+4'	Report	Boulacsoute 56' (o.g.)

Khalifa International Stadium, Al Rayyan
Attendance: 10,246
Referee: Ma Ning (China)

Morocco	Comoros

GK	1	Salaheddine Chihab
CB	3	Anas Bach
CB	16	Aschraf El Mahdioui	(substituted off) 73'
CB	6	Mohamed Rabie Hrimat (c)
DM	4	Soufiane Bouftini
RM	7	Mohamed Boulacsoute
CM	10	Amin Zahzouh	(substituted off) 90+6'
CM	14	Oussama Tannane	(substituted off) 73'
LM	19	Hamza El Moussaoui
CF	20	Tarik Tissoudali	(substituted off) 73'
CF	21	Karim El Berkaoui	(substituted off) 87'
Substitutions:
DF	18	Marwane Saâdane	(substituted on) 73'
MF	8	Sabir Bougrine	(substituted on) 73'
FW	9	Abderrazak Hamdallah	(substituted on) 73'
DF	2	Mohamed Moufid	(substituted on) 87'
DF	15	Marouane Louadni	(substituted on) 90+6'
Manager:
Tarik Sektioui

GK	16	Ali Ahamada (c)
RB	21	Nassuir Hamidou
CB	2	Karim Mohamed		(substituted off) 90+6'
CB	17	Yannis Kari
LB	20	Nassim Ahmed
CM	6	Zainou-Dine Mohamed		(substituted off) 90+4'
CM	13	Yassine Saindou
RW	12	Housseine Zakouani
AM	10	Affane Djambae	(yellow card) 20'
LW	7	Zaïd Amir
CF	9	Ibroihim Djoudja		(substituted off) 68'
Substitutions:
FW	8	Kassim Hadji		(substituted on) 68'
MF	5	Ismaël Mohamed		(substituted on) 90+4'
DF	4	Omar Abdoul Anziz		(substituted on) 90+6'
Manager:
(Madagascar) Hamada Jambay

Player of the Match:
Karim El Berkaoui (Morocco)

Assistant referees:
Zhou Fei (China)
Zhang Cheng (China)
Fourth official:
Abdulrahman Al-Jassim (Qatar)
Reserve assistant referee:
Taleb Al-Marri (Qatar)
Video assistant referee:
Jumpei Iida (Japan)
Assistant video assistant referee:
Khamis Al-Marri (Qatar)

=== Saudi Arabia vs Oman ===
2 December 2025
20:00

Saudi Arabia	2–1	Oman
Al-Buraikan 55'; Al-Shehri 77'	Report	Al-Habashi 70'

Education City Stadium, Al Rayyan
Attendance: 21,628
Referee: Adham Makhadmeh (Jordan)

Saudi Arabia	Oman

GK	1	Nawaf Al-Aqidi
RB	15	Abdullah Al-Khaibari	(substituted off) 90+2'
CB	5	Hassan Al-Tombakti
CB	14	Waleed Al-Ahmed
LB	8	Ayman Yahya	(substituted off) 72'
RM	13	Nawaf Boushal
CM	23	Mohamed Kanno
CM	6	Nasser Al-Dawsari	(substituted off) 76'
LM	18	Saleh Abu Al-Shamat	(substituted off) 72'
SS	10	Salem Al-Dawsari (c)
CF	9	Firas Al-Buraikan	(substituted off) 76'
Substitutions:
DF	2	Ali Majrashi	(substituted on) 72'
FW	11	Saleh Al-Shehri	(substituted on) 72'
MF	7	Musab Al-Juwayr	(substituted on) 76'
FW	20	Abdulrahman Al-Aboud	(substituted on) 76'
DF	4	Abdulelah Al-Amri	(substituted on) 90+2'
Manager:
(France) Hervé Renard

GK	1	Ibrahim Al-Mukhaini
CB	2	Ghanim Al-Habashi
CB	3	Thani Al-Rushaidi
CB	6	Ahmed Al-Khamisi
RM	14	Yousuf Al-Malki
CM	23	Harib Al-Saadi
CM	13	Musab Al-Mamari	(substituted off) 46'
LM	17	Ali Al-Busaidi (c)	(substituted off) 76'
RF	20	Salaah Al-Yahyaei	(substituted off) 58'
CF	7	Issam Al-Sabhi	(substituted off) 88'
LF	11	Nasser Al-Rawahi	(substituted off) 58'
Substitutions:
FW	10	Jameel Al-Yahmadi	(substituted on) 46'
MF	16	Ahed Al-Mashaiki	(substituted on) 58'
FW	15	Rabia Al-Alawi	(substituted on) 58'
FW	8	Zahir Al-Aghbari	(substituted on) 76'
FW	9	Mohammed Al-Ghafri	(substituted on) 88'
Manager:
(Portugal) Carlos Queiroz

Player of the Match:
Salem Al-Dawsari (Saudi Arabia)

Assistant referees:
Mohammad Al-Kalaf (Jordan)
Ahmad Al-Roalle (Jordan)
Fourth official:
Juan Gabriel Benítez (Paraguay)
Reserve assistant referee:
Eduardo Cardozo (Paraguay)
Video assistant referee:
Sivakorn Pu-udom (Thailand)
Assistant video assistant referee:
Allen Chapman (United States)

=== Oman vs Morocco ===
5 December 2025
17:30

Oman	0–0	Morocco
	Report

Education City Stadium, Al Rayyan
Attendance: 37,996
Referee: Juan Gabriel Benítez (Paraguay)

Oman	Morocco

GK	1	Ibrahim Al-Mukhaini
CB	5	Musab Al-Shaqsy
CB	3	Thani Al-Rushaidi
CB	6	Ahmed Al-Khamisi	(substituted off) 86'
DM	23	Harib Al-Saadi (c)
RM	10	Jameel Al-Yahmadi	(substituted off) 77'
CM	12	Abdullah Fawaz	(substituted off) 70'
CM	13	Musab Al-Mamari	(substituted off) 70'
LM	14	Yousuf Al-Malki
SS	11	Nasser Al-Rawahi	(substituted off) 86'
CF	7	Issam Al-Sabhi
Substitutions:
MF	16	Ahed Al-Mashaiki	(substituted on) 70'
MF	20	Salaah Al-Yahyaei	(substituted on) 70'
FW	8	Zahir Al-Aghbari	(substituted on) 77'
DF	19	Mahmood Al-Mushaifri	(substituted on) 86'
FW	15	Rabia Al-Alawi	(substituted on) 86'
Manager:
(Portugal) Carlos Queiroz

GK	12	Mehdi Benabid
RB	7	Mohamed Boulacsoute
CB	4	Soufiane Bouftini
CB	18	Marwane Saâdane
LB	19	Hamza El Moussaoui
DM	3	Anas Bach
DM	6	Mohamed Rabie Hrimat
AM	10	Amin Zahzouh		(substituted off) 73'
AM	13	Walid El Karti		(substituted off) 79'
CF	9	Abderrazak Hamdallah (c)	(red card) 53'
CF	21	Karim El Berkaoui	(yellow card) 41'	(substituted off) 73'
Substitutions:
MF	16	Aschraf El Mahdioui		(substituted on) 73'
FW	20	Tarik Tissoudali		(substituted on) 73'
FW	11	Walid Azaro		(substituted on) 79'
Manager:
Tarik Sektioui

Player of the Match:
Ibrahim Al-Mukhaini (Oman)

Assistant referees:
Eduardo Cardozo (Paraguay)
Milcíades Saldívar (Paraguay)
Fourth official:
Espen Eskås (Norway)
Reserve assistant referee:
Jan Erik Engan (Norway)
Video assistant referee:
Rodolpho Toski (Brazil)
Assistant video assistant referee:
Sivakorn Pu-udom (Thailand)

=== Comoros vs Saudi Arabia ===
5 December 2025
21:30

Comoros	1–3	Saudi Arabia
Djoudja 63'	Report	Kanno 45+4', 51'; S. Al-Dawsari 76'

Al Bayt Stadium, Al Khor
Attendance: 32,219
Referee: Juan Gabriel Calderón (Costa Rica)

Comoros	Saudi Arabia

GK	1	Adel Anzimati
RB	21	Nassuir Hamidou
CB	2	Karim Mohamed
CB	17	Yannis Kari
LB	20	Nassim Ahmed	(yellow card) 4'	(substituted off) 82'
CM	6	Zainou-Dine Mohamed	(yellow card) 45+2'
CM	13	Yassine Saindou
RW	12	Housseine Zakouani
AM	10	Affane Djambae
LW	8	Kassim Hadji		(substituted off) 70'
CF	9	Ibroihim Djoudja (c)		(substituted off) 82'
Substitutions:
MF	5	Ismaël Mohamed		(substituted on) 70'
MF	18	Alfonsi Haslane		(substituted on) 82'
DF	3	Tamime Tarek		(substituted on) 82'
Manager:
(Madagascar) Hamada Jambay

GK	1	Nawaf Al-Aqidi
RB	2	Ali Majrashi
CB	5	Hassan Al-Tombakti		(substituted off) 61'
CB	4	Abdulelah Al-Amri
LB	8	Ayman Yahya		(substituted off) 74'
DM	15	Abdullah Al-Khaibari
CM	23	Mohamed Kanno
CM	7	Musab Al-Juwayr	(yellow card) 6'	(substituted off) 81'
RF	20	Abdulrahman Al-Aboud		(substituted off) 61'
CF	9	Firas Al-Buraikan		(substituted off) 81'
LF	10	Salem Al-Dawsari (c)
Substitutions:
FW	18	Saleh Abu Al-Shamat		(substituted on) 61'
DF	3	Jehad Thakri		(substituted on) 61'
DF	13	Nawaf Boushal		(substituted on) 74'
MF	6	Nasser Al-Dawsari		(substituted on) 81'
FW	19	Abdullah Al-Hamdan		(substituted on) 81'
Manager:
(France) Hervé Renard

Player of the Match:
Salem Al-Dawsari (Saudi Arabia)

Assistant referees:
Juan Carlos Mora (Costa Rica)
William Arrieta (Costa Rica)
Fourth official:
Amin Omar (Egypt)
Reserve assistant referee:
Mahmoud Abouregal (Egypt)
Video assistant referee:
Benjamin Pineda (Costa Rica)
Assistant video assistant referee:
Lahlou Benbraham (Algeria)

=== Morocco vs Saudi Arabia ===
8 December 2025
20:00

Morocco	1–0	Saudi Arabia
El Berkaoui 11'	Report

Lusail Stadium, Lusail
Attendance: 78,131
Referee: Mario Escobar (Guatemala)

Morocco	Saudi Arabia

GK	12	Mehdi Benabid
RB	7	Mohamed Boulacsoute
CB	4	Soufiane Bouftini
CB	18	Marwane Saâdane
LB	19	Hamza El Moussaoui
DM	3	Anas Bach
DM	6	Mohamed Rabie Hrimat (c)	(yellow card) 35'
AM	10	Amin Zahzouh		(substituted off) 70'
AM	13	Walid El Karti		(substituted off) 86'
CF	20	Tarik Tissoudali		(substituted off) 90+1'
CF	21	Karim El Berkaoui		(substituted off) 70'
Substitutions:
DF	2	Mohamed Moufid		(substituted on) 70'
DF	5	Mahmoud Bentayg		(substituted on) 70'
MF	16	Aschraf El Mahdioui		(substituted on) 86'
DF	15	Marouane Louadni		(substituted on) 90+1'
Manager:
Tarik Sektioui

GK	21	Abdulrahman Al-Sanbi
CB	14	Waleed Al-Ahmed	(substituted off) 61'
CB	17	Mohammed Sulaiman
CB	4	Abdulelah Al-Amri
RM	2	Ali Majrashi	(substituted off) 61'
CM	16	Murad Hawsawi
CM	7	Musab Al-Juwayr
LM	13	Nawaf Boushal
RF	20	Abdulrahman Al-Aboud	(substituted off) 79'
CF	11	Saleh Al-Shehri (c)	(substituted off) 61'
LF	18	Saleh Abu Al-Shamat	(substituted off) 61'
Substitutions:
MF	12	Mohammed Abu Al-Shamat	(substituted on) 61'
MF	6	Nasser Al-Dawsari	(substituted on) 61'
FW	19	Abdullah Al-Hamdan	(substituted on) 61'
FW	9	Firas Al-Buraikan	(substituted on) 61'
MF	8	Ayman Yahya	(substituted on) 79'
Manager:
(France) Hervé Renard

Player of the Match:
Karim El Berkaoui (Morocco)

Assistant referees:
Luis Ventura (Guatemala)
Humberto Panjoj (Guatemala)
Fourth official:
Cristian Garay (Chile)
Reserve assistant referee:
José Retamal (Chile)
Video assistant referee:
Antonio García Non (Uruguay)
Assistant video assistant referee:
Fedayi San (Switzerland)

=== Oman vs Comoros ===
8 December 2025
20:00

Oman	2–1	Comoros
Al-Sabhi 30', 43'	Report	Hamidou 68'

Stadium 974, Doha
Attendance: 9,348
Referee: Pierre Atcho (Gabon)

Oman	Comoros

GK	1	Ibrahim Al-Mukhaini
CB	5	Musab Al-Shaqsy
CB	3	Thani Al-Rushaidi	(yellow card) 84'
CB	6	Ahmed Al-Khamisi		(substituted off) 86'
RM	14	Yousuf Al-Malki
CM	23	Harib Al-Saadi
CM	12	Abdullah Fawaz		(substituted off) 70'
LM	17	Ali Al-Busaidi (c)		(substituted off) 70'
RF	10	Jameel Al-Yahmadi		(substituted off) 77'
CF	7	Issam Al-Sabhi
LF	8	Zahir Al-Aghbari		(substituted off) 86'
Substitutions:
FW	11	Nasser Al-Rawahi	(yellow card) 86'	(substituted on) 56'
MF	16	Ahed Al-Mashaiki		(substituted on) 66'
FW	15	Rabia Al-Alawi		(substituted on) 66'
MF	20	Salaah Al-Yahyaei		(substituted on) 82'
MF	13	Musab Al-Mamari		(substituted on) 82'
Manager:
(Portugal) Carlos Queiroz

GK	16	Ali Ahamada (c)
RB	21	Nassuir Hamidou
CB	4	Omar Abdoul Anziz	(yellow card) 26'
CB	17	Yannis Kari	(yellow card) 74'
LB	3	Tamime Tarek
CM	6	Zainou-Dine Mohamed
CM	13	Yassine Saindou
RW	8	Kassim Hadji
AM	18	Alfonsi Haslane		(substituted off) 54'
LW	9	Ibroihim Djoudja		(substituted off) 90+2'
CF	10	Affane Djambae		(substituted off) 19'
Substitutions:
MF	5	Ismaël Mohamed		(substituted on) 19'
DF	2	Karim Mohamed		(substituted on) 54'
MF	22	Hamis M'sa		(substituted on) 90+2'
Manager:
(Madagascar) Hamada Jambay

Player of the Match:
Issam Al-Sabhi (Oman)

Assistant referees:
Boris Ditsoga (Gabon)
Danek Moutsassi (Congo)
Fourth official:
Campbell-Kirk Kawana-Waugh (New Zealand)
Reserve assistant referee:
Isaac Trevis (New Zealand)
Video assistant referee:
Lahlou Benbraham (Algeria)
Assistant video assistant referee:
Benjamín Pineda (Costa Rica)
