= Pett (disambiguation) =

Pett is a village in East Sussex, England.

Pett may also refer to:

== People ==
- Pett dynasty, English shipbuilding family of the 15th–17th centuries
  - Peter Pett (shipwright, died 1672) (1610–1672), shipwright, commissioner of Chatham Dockyard
  - Peter Pett (lawyer) (1630–1699), lawyer and author
  - Peter Pett (shipwright, died 1589) (died 1589), shipwright at Deptford
  - Phineas Pett (1570–1647), shipwright, commissioner of Chatham Dockyard
- Joel Pett (born 1953), American cartoonist
- John Pett (1927–2021), British film director/producer
- Lionel Bradley Pett (1909–2003), Canadian biochemist and nutritionist
- Lynn Pett (1940–2017), mayor of Murray, Utah, United States
- Martin Pett (born 1986), German footballer
- Norman Pett (1891–1960), English cartoonist
- Oliver Pett (born 1988), English squash player
- Phineas Pett (priest) (1756–1830), Archdeacon of Oxford
- Sarah Pett, Professor of Infectious Diseases, University College London
- Tom Pett (born 1991), English footballer
- William Pett (1873–1954), British cyclist

== Other ==
- Kamchatka Time, a timezone abbreviated to PETT
- Pett Productions, British media production company

== See also ==
- Pett Bottom (disambiguation)
