= Morocco national football team results (2020–present) =

This article provides details of international football games played by the Morocco national football team from 2020 onwards. This list also includes the results of the Morocco A' team, since both the African Nations Championship and the FIFA Arab Cup are FIFA-recognized tournaments.

== Results ==
Win Draw Loss Cancelled Fixture

=== 2020 ===
9 October 2020 Friendly	Morocco	3–1	Senegal	Rabat, Morocco
19:00 UTC+1	Amallah 10'; En-Nesyri 71'; El-Arabi 86'	Report	I. Sarr 88' (pen.)	Stadium: Prince Moulay Abdellah Stadium; Attendance: 0 (Note: Due to the COVID-19 pandemic in Africa, the match was played behind closed doors.); Referee: Mamadou Keita (Mali)

13 October 2020 Friendly	Morocco	1–1	DR Congo	Rabat, Morocco
19:00 UTC+1	Mazraoui 45'	Report	Wissa 60'	Stadium: Prince Moulay Abdellah Stadium; Attendance: 0 Referee: Alioune Sow Sandigui (Senegal)

13 November 2020 2021 AFCON Q	Morocco	4–1	Central African Republic	Casablanca, Morocco
20:00 UTC+1	Hakimi 10'; Ziyech 31' (pen.), 34'; Aboukhlal 64'	Report	Mafouta 25'	Stadium: Stade Mohammed V Attendance: 0 Referee: Boubou Traoré (Mali)

17 November 2020 2021 AFCON Q	Central African Republic	0–2	Morocco	Douala, Cameroon
17:00 UTC+1		Report	Ziyech 39'; En-Nesyri 90+1'	Stadium: Stade de la Réunification; Referee: Imtehaz Heeralall (Mauritius)

=== 2021 ===
18 January 2021 CHAN 2020 GS	Morocco	1–0	Togo	Douala, Cameroon
17:00 UTC+1	Jabrane 27' (pen.)	Report		Stadium: Stade de la Réunification; Referee: Andofetra Rakotojaona (Madagascar)

22 January 2021 CHAN 2020 GS	Morocco	0–0	Rwanda	Douala, Cameroon
17:00 UTC+1		Report		Stadium: Stade de la Réunification; Referee: Ahmad Heeralall (Mauritius)

26 January 2021 CHAN 2020 GS	Uganda	2–5	Morocco	Douala, Cameroon
20:00 UTC+1	Orit 25'; Kyeyune 84'	Report	El Kaabi 45+4' (pen.); Rahimi 51', 80'; El Moussaoui 71'; Lukwago 90+2' (o.g.)	Stadium: Stade de la Réunification; Referee: Boubou Traore (Mali)

31 January 2021 CHAN 2020 QF	Morocco	3–1	Zambia	Douala, Cameroon
17:00 UTC+1	Rahimi 1'; Ali Bemammer 8'; El Kaabi 39' (pen.)	Report	Phiri 80'	Stadium: Stade de la Réunification; Referee: Pacifique Ndabihawenimana (Burundi)

3 February 2021 CHAN 2020 SF	Morocco	4–0	Cameroon	Limbe, Cameroon
20:00 UTC+1	Bouftini 29'; Rahimi 40', 74'; Ali Bemammer 82'	Report		Stadium: Limbe Stadium; Referee: Jean Ngambo (DR Congo)

7 February 2021 CHAN 2020 Final	Mali	0–2	Morocco	Yaoundé, Cameroon
20:00 UTC+1		Report	Bouftini 68'; El Kaabi 79'	Stadium: Stade Ahmadou Ahidjo; Referee: Peter Waweru (Kenya)

26 March 2021 2021 AFCON Q	Mauritania	0–0	Morocco	Nouakchott, Mauritania
19:00 UTC+1		Report		Stadium: Stade Cheikha Ould Boïdiya; Attendance: 0 Referee: Joshua Bondo (Botswana)

30 March 2021 2021 AFCON Q	Morocco	1–0	Burundi	Rabat, Morocco
20:00 UTC+1	Munir 45'	Report		Stadium: Prince Moulay Abdellah Stadium; Attendance: 0 Referee: Blaise Yuven Ngwa (Cameroon)

8 June 2021 Friendly	Morocco	1–0	Ghana	Rabat, Morocco
20:00 UTC+1	El Yamiq 69'	Report		Stadium: Prince Moulay Abdellah Stadium; Attendance: 0 Referee: Adalbert Diouf (Senegal)

12 June 2021 Friendly	Morocco	1–0	Burkina Faso	Rabat, Morocco
20:00 UTC+1	Hakimi 51'	Report		Stadium: Prince Moulay Abdellah Stadium; Attendance: 0 Referee: Abdel Aziz Mohamed Bouh (Mauritania)

2 September 2021 2022 World Cup qualification	Morocco	2–0	Sudan	Rabat, Morocco
20:00 UTC+1	Aguerd 10'; Ahmed 53' (o.g.)	Report		Stadium: Prince Moulay Abdellah Stadium; Attendance: 0 Referee: Maguette N'Diaye (Senegal)

6 October 2021 2022 World Cup qualification	Morocco	5–0	Guinea-Bissau	Rabat, Morocco
20:00 UTC+1	Hakimi 31'; Louza 45+1' (pen.); Chair 49'; El Kaabi 62'; Munir 82'	Report		Stadium: Prince Moulay Abdellah Stadium; Attendance: 0 Referee: Boubou Traoré (Mali)

9 October 2021 2022 World Cup qualification	Guinea-Bissau	0–3	Morocco	Casablanca, Morocco
20:00 UTC+1		Report	El Kaabi 10', 70'; Barkok 20'	Stadium: Stade Mohamed V Attendance: 0 Referee: Jean Jacques Ndala Ngambo (Democratic Republic of the Congo)

12 October 2021 (Note: The match was originally scheduled to be played on 6 September 2021, 16:00 UTC+0, but was postponed and relocated due to security concerns following the 2021 Guinean coup d'état.) 2022 World Cup qualification	Guinea	1–4	Morocco	Rabat, Morocco
20:00 UTC+1	Kané 31'	Report	El Kaabi 21'; Amallah 43', 65'; Boufal 89'	Stadium: Prince Moulay Abdellah Stadium; Attendance: 0 Referee: Sidi Alioum (Cameroon)

12 November 2021 2022 World Cup qualification	Sudan	0–3	Morocco	Rabat, Morocco
20:00 UTC+1		Report	Mmaee 3', 63'; Louza 90+3'	Stadium: Prince Moulay Abdellah Stadium; Attendance: 0 Referee: Peter Waweru (Kenya)

16 November 2021 2022 World Cup qualification	Morocco	3–0	Guinea	Rabat, Morocco
20:00 UTC+1	Mmaee 21' (pen.), 29'; El Kaabi 60'	Report		Stadium: Prince Moulay Abdellah Stadium; Attendance: 0 Referee: Joshua Bondo (Botswana)

1 December 2021 2021 FIFA Arab Cup GS	Morocco	4–0	Palestine	Al Wakrah, Qatar
19:00 UTC+3	Nahiri 31'; Hafidi 56', 64'; Benoun 87' (pen.)	Report		Stadium: Al Janoub Stadium; Attendance: 3,843; Referee: Matthew Conger (New Zealand)

4 December 2021 2021 FIFA Arab Cup GS	Jordan	0–4	Morocco	Al Rayyan, Qatar
13:00 UTC+3		Report	Jabrane 4'; Benoun 25'; Chibi 45+3'; Rahimi 88' (pen.)	Stadium: Ahmed bin Ali Stadium; Attendance: 7,890; Referee: Facundo Tello (Argentina)

7 December 2021 2021 FIFA Arab Cup GS	Morocco	1–0	Saudi Arabia	Doha, Qatar
18:00 UTC+3	El Berkaoui 45+4' (pen.)	Report		Stadium: Al Thumama Stadium; Attendance: 8,502; Referee: Andrés Matonte (Uruguay)

11 December 2021 2021 FIFA Arab Cup QF	Morocco	2–2 (a.e.t.) (3–5 p)	Algeria	Doha, Qatar
22:00 UTC+3	Nahiri 64'; Benoun 111'	Report	Brahimi 62' (pen.); Belaïli 102'	Stadium: Al Thumama Stadium; Attendance: 24,823; Referee: Wilton Sampaio (Brazil)
	Penalties
	Rahimi (penalty scored); Benoun (penalty scored); Jabrane (penalty scored); El Berkaoui (penalty missed)		(penalty scored) Belaïli; (penalty scored) Bendebka; (penalty scored) Bedrane; (penalty scored) Benayada; (penalty scored) Tougai

31 December 2021 Friendly	Morocco	Cancelled	Cape Verde	Rabat, Morocco
				Stadium: Prince Moulay Abdellah Stadium
Note: The match was cancelled due to the inability of a number of players to join the national teams because of their commitment to their clubs.

=== 2022 ===
10 January 2022 2021 AFCON GS	Morocco	1–0	Ghana	Yaoundé, Cameroon
17:00 (UTC+1)	Boufal 83'	Report		Stadium: Stade Ahmadou Ahidjo; Referee: Joshua Bondo (Botswana)

14 January 2022 2021 AFCON GS	Morocco	2–0	Comoros	Yaoundé, Cameroon
17:00 (UTC+1)	Amallah 16'; Aboukhlal 89'	Report		Stadium: Stade Ahmadou Ahidjo; Referee: Sadok Selmi (Tunisia)

18 January 2022 2021 AFCON GS	Gabon	2–2	Morocco	Yaoundé, Cameroon
20:00 (UTC+1)	Allevinah 21'; Aguerd 81' (o.g.)	Report	Boufal 74' (pen.); Hakimi 84'	Stadium: Stade Ahmadou Ahidjo; Referee: Beida Dahane (Mauritania)

25 January 2022 2021 AFCON R16	Morocco	2–1	Malawi	Yaoundé, Cameroon
20:00 (UTC+1)	En-Nesyri 45+2'; Hakimi 70'	Report	Mhango 7'	Stadium: Stade Ahmadou Ahidjo; Referee: Pacifique Ndabihawenimana (Burundi)

30 January 2022 2021 AFCON QF	Egypt	2–1 (a.e.t.)	Morocco	Yaoundé, Cameroon
16:00 (UTC+1)	Salah 53'; Trézéguet 100'	Report	Boufal 6' (pen.)	Stadium: Stade Ahmadou Ahidjo (Note: The match was originally due to be held at Olembe Stadium in Yaoundé but was relocated following the Yaoundé stadium disaster.); Referee: Maguette N'Diaye (Senegal)

25 March 2022 2022 World Cup qualification	DR Congo	1–1	Morocco	Kinshasa, DR Congo
16:00 UTC+1	Wissa 12'	Report	Tissoudali 76'	Stadium: Stade des Martyrs; Referee: Victor Gomes (South Africa)

29 March 2022 2022 World Cup qualification	Morocco	4–1 (5–2 agg.)	DR Congo	Casablanca, Morocco
19:30 UTC+0	Ounahi 21', 54'; Tissoudali 45+7'; Hakimi 69'	Report	Malango 77'	Stadium: Stade Mohammed V Referee: Pacifique Ndabihawenimana (Burundi)

1 June 2022 Friendly	United States	3–0	Morocco	Cincinnati, United States
19:30 UTC−4	Aaronson 26'; Weah 32'; Wright 64' (pen.)			Stadium: TQL Stadium; Referee: Ismael Cornejo (El Salvador)

9 June 2022 2023 AFCON Q	Morocco	2–1	South Africa	Rabat, Morocco
20:00 UTC+1	En-Nesyri 51'; El Kaabi 88'	Report	Foster 8'	Stadium: Prince Moulay Abdellah Stadium; Referee: Sadok Selmi (Tunisia)

13 June 2022 2023 AFCON Q	Liberia	0–2	Morocco	Casablanca, Morocco
20:00 UTC+1		Report	Fajr 56' (pen.); En-Nesyri 57'	Stadium: Stade Mohammed V Referee: Mohamed Moussa (Niger)

23 September 2022 Friendly	Morocco	2–0	Chile	Barcelona, Spain
21:00 UTC+2	Boufal 66' (pen.); Sabiri 78'	Report		Stadium: RCDE Stadium; Referee: Martin Dohál (Slovakia)

27 September 2022 Friendly	Morocco	0–0	Paraguay	Seville, Spain
21:00 UTC+2		Report		Stadium: Estadio Benito Villamarín; Referee: Jesús Gil Manzano (Spain)

17 November 2022 Friendly	Morocco	3–0	Georgia	Sharjah, United Arab Emirates
20:00 UTC+4	En-Nesyri 5'; Ziyech 29'; Boufal 71' (pen.)	Report		Stadium: Sharjah Stadium; Referee: Adel Al Naqbi (United Arab Emirates)

23 November 2022 2022 FIFA World Cup GS	Morocco	0–0	Croatia	Al Khor, Qatar
13:00 UTC+3		Report		Stadium: Al Bayt Stadium; Attendance: 59,407; Referee: Fernando Rapallini (Argentina)

27 November 2022 2022 FIFA World Cup GS	Belgium	0–2	Morocco	Doha, Qatar
16:00 UTC+3		Report	Saïss 73'; Aboukhlal 90+2'	Stadium: Al Thumama Stadium; Attendance: 43,738; Referee: César Ramos (Mexico)

1 December 2022 2022 FIFA World Cup GS	Canada	1–2	Morocco	Doha, Qatar
18:00 UTC+3	Aguerd 40' (o.g.)	Report	Ziyech 4'; En-Nesyri 23'	Stadium: Al Thumama Stadium; Attendance: 43,102; Referee: Raphael Claus (Brazil)

6 December 2022 2022 FIFA World Cup R16	Morocco	0–0 (a.e.t.) (3–0 p)	Spain	Al Rayyan, Qatar
18:00 UTC+3		Report		Stadium: Education City Stadium; Attendance: 44,667; Referee: Fernando Rapallini (Argentina)
	Penalties
	Sabiri (penalty scored); Ziyech (penalty scored); Benoun (penalty missed); Hakimi (penalty scored)		(penalty missed) Sarabia; (penalty missed) Soler; (penalty missed) Busquets

10 December 2022 2022 FIFA World Cup QF	Morocco	1–0	Portugal	Doha, Qatar
18:00 UTC+3	En-Nesyri 42'	Report		Stadium: Al Thumama Stadium; Attendance: 44,198; Referee: Facundo Tello (Argentina)

14 December 2022 2022 FIFA World Cup SF	France	2–0	Morocco	Al Khor, Qatar
22:00 UTC+3	T. Hernandez 5'; Kolo Muani 79'	Report		Stadium: Al Bayt Stadium; Attendance: 68,294; Referee: César Arturo Ramos (Mexico)

17 December 2022 2022 FIFA World Cup 3rd place	Croatia	2–1	Morocco	Al Rayyan, Qatar
18:00 UTC+3	Gvardiol 7'; Oršić 42'	Report	Dari 9'	Stadium: Khalifa International Stadium; Attendance: 44,137; Referee: Abdulrahman Al-Jassim (Qatar)

=== 2023 ===
March 2023 2023 AFCON Q	Morocco	Cancelled	Zimbabwe
Note: Zimbabwe were excluded from the qualifiers as their suspension by FIFA due to political interference had not been lifted in the deadline set by CAF.

March 2023 2023 AFCON Q	Zimbabwe	Cancelled	Morocco
Note: Zimbabwe were excluded from the qualifiers as their suspension by FIFA due to political interference had not been lifted in the deadline set by CAF.

25 March 2023 Friendly	Morocco	2–1	Brazil	Tanger, Morocco
22:00 UTC+0	Boufal 29'; Sabiri 78'	Report	Casemiro 67'	Stadium: Ibn Batouta Stadium; Referee: Sadok Selmi (Tunisia)

28 March 2023 Friendly	Morocco	0–0	Peru	Madrid, Spain
21:30 UTC+1		Report		Stadium: Metropolitano Stadium

12 June 2023 Friendly	Morocco	0–0	Cape Verde	Rabat, Morocco
20:00 UTC+1		Report		Stadium: Prince Moulay Abdellah Stadium; Attendance: 55,500; Referee: Mahamadou Kéïta (Mali)

17 June 2023 2023 AFCON Q	South Africa	2–1	Morocco	Johannesburg, South Africa
17:00 UTC+1	Mohamedi 5' (o.g.); Lepasa 48'	Report	Ziyech 60'	Stadium: Soccer City; Referee: Alhadi Allaou Mahamat (Chad)

12 September 2023 Friendly	Morocco	1–0	Burkina Faso	Lens, France
	Ounahi 37'	Report		Stadium: Stade Bollaert-Delelis; Referee: Jérémie Pignard (France)

14 October 2023 Friendly	Ivory Coast	1–1	Morocco	Abidjan, Ivory Coast
18:00 UTC+1	Haller 45+3'	Report	El Kaabi 81'	Stadium: Felix Houphouet Boigny Stadium

17 October 2023 (Note: Originally scheduled on 9 September 2023, the game was postponed and rescheduled due to the 2023 Al Haouz earthquake.) 2023 AFCON Q	Morocco	3–0	Liberia	Agadir, Morocco
20:00 UTC+1	Harit 45+2'; El Kaabi 59' (pen.); Adli 88'	Report		Stadium: Stade Adrar; Referee: Ahmad Imtehaz Heeralall (Mauritius)

16 November 2023 2026 World Cup qualification	Morocco	Cancelled	Eritrea	Agadir, Morocco
				Stadium: Stade Adrar
Note: Eritrea withdrew from the qualifiers before the first matches were played.

21 November 2023 2026 World Cup qualification	Tanzania	0–2	Morocco	Dar es Salaam, Tanzania
22:00 UTC+3		Report	Ziyech 28'; Mwamnyeto 54' (o.g.)	Stadium: Benjamin Mkapa National Stadium; Attendance: 60,000; Referee: Abongile Tom (South Africa)

=== 2024 ===
7 January 2024 Friendly	Morocco	Cancelled	Gambia	Salé, Morocco
		Report		Stadium: Mohammed VI Football Complex

11 January 2024 Friendly	Sierra Leone	1–3	Morocco	San Pedro, Ivory Coast
15:00 UTC+0	Komeh 10'	Report	En-Nesyri 30', 55'; Boufal 35'	Stadium: Laurent Pokou Stadium

17 January 2024 2023 AFCON GS	Morocco	3–0	Tanzania	San Pédro, Ivory Coast
17:00 UTC+0	Saïss 30'; Ounahi 77'; En-Nesyri 80'	Report		Stadium: Laurent Pokou Stadium; Attendance: 15,478; Referee: Alhadj Allaou Mahamat (Chad)

21 January 2024 2023 AFCON GS	Morocco	1–1	DR Congo	San Pédro, Ivory Coast
14:00 UTC+0	Hakimi 6'	Report	Silas 76'	Stadium: Laurent Pokou Stadium; Attendance: 13,342; Referee: Peter Waweru (Kenya)

24 January 2024 2023 AFCON GS	Zambia	0–1	Morocco	San Pédro, Ivory Coast
20:00 UTC+0		Report	Ziyech 37'	Stadium: Laurent Pokou Stadium; Referee: Tanguy Patrice Mebiame (Gabon)

30 January 2024 2023 AFCON R16	Morocco	0–2	South Africa	San Pédro, Ivory Coast
20:00 UTC+0		Report	Makgopa 57'; Mokoena 90+5'	Stadium: Laurent Pokou Stadium; Referee: Mahmood Ismail (Sudan)

22 March 2024 Friendly	Morocco	1–0	Angola	Agadir, Morocco
22:00 UTC+0	Carmo 71' (o.g.)	Report		Stadium: Adrar Stadium

26 March 2024 Friendly	Morocco	0–0	Mauritania	Agadir, Morocco
				Stadium: Adrar Stadium

7 June 2024 2026 World Cup qualification	Morocco	2–1	Zambia	Agadir, Morocco
20:00 UTC+1	Ziyech 6' (pen.); Ben Seghir 67'	Report	Chilufya 80'	Stadium: Adrar Stadium; Referee: Issa Sy (Senegal)

11 June 2024 2026 World Cup qualification	Congo	0–6	Morocco	Agadir, Morocco
17:00 UTC+1		Report	Ounahi 8'; Riad 16'; El Kaabi 30', 39', 53'; Rahimi 62'	Stadium: Adrar Stadium; Attendance: 30,000; Referee: Daniel Nii Laryea (Ghana)

6 September 2024 2025 AFCON Q (Note: Morocco had already qualified for the final tournament as the host nation.)	Morocco	4–1	Gabon	Agadir, Morocco
	Ziyech 10' (pen.), 26' (pen.); Brahim 59'; El Kaabi 82'	Report	Aubameyang 40' (pen.)	Stadium: Adrar Stadium; Attendance: 38,000; Referee: Dahane Beida (Mauritania)

9 September 2024 2025 AFCON Q	Lesotho	0–1	Morocco	Agadir, Morocco
19:00 UTC+1		Report	Brahim 90+2'	Stadium: Adrar Stadium; Referee: Clement Franklin Kpan (Ivory Coast)

12 October 2024 2025 AFCON Q	Morocco	5–0	Central African Republic	Oujda, Morocco
20:00 UTC+1	Ezzalzouli 18'; Ounahi 38', 45+2'; Hakimi 45'; Rahimi 71' (pen.)	Report		Stadium: Honor Stadium; Attendance: 19,800; Referee: Alhasan Baboucarr Bass (Gambia)

15 October 2024 2025 AFCON Q	Central African Republic	0–4	Morocco	Oujda, Morocco
20:00 UTC+1		Report	Ben Seghir 34', 38'; En-Nesyri 50' (pen.); Ezzalzouli 66'	Stadium: Honor Stadium; Referee: Naby Laye Toure (Guinea)

10 November 2024 2025 AFCON Q	Gabon	1–5	Morocco	Franceville, Gabon
19:00 UTC+1	Bouanga 4'	Report	Harkass 17'; Brahim 20', 23'; En-Nesyri 81'; Saibari 90'	Stadium: Stade de Franceville; Referee: Abongile Tom (South Africa)

18 November 2024 2025 AFCON Q	Morocco	7–0	Lesotho	Oujda, Morocco
20:00 UTC+1	Brahim 5', 15', 42'; Rahimi 37', 45+2' (pen.); En-Nesyri 68'; Saibari 70'	Report		Stadium: Honor Stadium; Referee: Jean-Jacques Ndala (DR Congo)

=== 2025 ===
21 March 2025 2026 World Cup qualification	Niger	1–2	Morocco	Oujda, Morocco
21:30 UTC+0	Oumarou 47'	Report	Saibari 59'; El Khannouss 90+1'	Stadium: Honor Stadium; Attendance: 20,000; Referee: Omar Artan (Somalia)

25 March 2025 2026 World Cup qualification	Morocco	2–0	Tanzania	Oujda, Morocco
21:30 UTC+0	Aguerd 51'; Brahim 58' (pen.)	Report (FIFA); Report (CAF)		Stadium: Honor Stadium; Attendance: 20,000; Referee: Alhadi Allaou Mahamat (Chad)

6 June 2025 Friendly	Morocco	2–0	Tunisia	Fez, Morocco
21:00 UTC+1	Hakimi 80'; El Kaabi 90+4'			Stadium: Fez Stadium; Attendance: 35,000; Referee: Boubou Traoré (Mali)

9 June 2025 Friendly	Morocco	1–0	Benin	Fez, Morocco
21:00 UTC+1	El Kaabi 45+2'			Stadium: Fez Stadium; Referee: Melki Mehrez (Tunisia)

3 August 2025 CHAN 2024 GS	Morocco	2–0	Angola	Nairobi, Kenya
18:00 UTC+3	Riahi 29'; Quinito 81' (o.g.)	Report		Stadium: Nyayo National Stadium; Referee: Abdou Abdel Mefire (Cameroon)

10 August 2025 CHAN 2024 GS	Kenya	1–0	Morocco	Nairobi, Kenya
15:00 UTC+3	Ogam 42'	Report		Stadium: Moi International Sports Centre; Referee: Vincent Kabore (Ghana)

14 August 2025 CHAN 2024 GS	Morocco	3–1	Zambia	Nairobi, Kenya
17:00 UTC+3	Hrimat 45+2'; Lamlioui 66'; Bougrine 90+5'	Report	Phiri 70'	Stadium: Nyayo National Stadium; Referee: Adalbert Diouf (Senegal)

17 August 2025 CHAN 2024 GS	DR Congo	1–3	Morocco	Nairobi, Kenya
15:00 UTC+3	Kitambala 58'	Report	Lamlioui 8', 80'; Hrimat 70' (pen.)	Stadium: Nyayo National Stadium; Referee: Ousmane Diakate (Mali)

22 August 2025 CHAN 2024 QF	Tanzania	0–1	Morocco	Dar es Salaam, Tanzania
20:00 UTC+3		Report	Lamlioui 65'	Stadium: Benjamin Mkapa Stadium; Referee: Abdou Abdel Mefire (Cameroon)

26 August 2025 CHAN 2024 SF	Morocco	1–1 (a.e.t.) (5–3 p)	Senegal	Kampala, Uganda
20:30 UTC+3	Bougrine 23'	Report	Layousse 16'	Stadium: Mandela National Stadium; Referee: Jelly Chavani (South Africa)
	Penalties
	Hrimat (penalty scored); Lamlioui (penalty scored); Khairi (penalty scored); Bach (penalty scored); Mehri (penalty scored)		Ndiaye (penalty missed); Vieux (penalty scored); Ciss (penalty scored); Ba (penalty scored)

30 August 2025 CHAN 2024 Final	Madagascar	2–3	Morocco	Nairobi, Kenya
18:00 UTC+3	Mantasoa 9'; Rakotondraibe 68'	Report	Mehri 27'; Lamlioui 44', 80'	Stadium: Moi International Sports Centre; Referee: Abdou Abdel Mefire (Cameroon)

5 September 2025 2026 World Cup qualification	Morocco	5–0	Niger	Rabat, Morocco
20:00 UTC+1	Saibari 29', 38'; El Kaabi 51'; Igamane 69'; Ounahi 84'	Report (FIFA); Report (CAF)		Stadium: Prince Moulay Abdellah Stadium; Attendance: 63,000; Referee: Jean-Jacques Ndala Ngambo (DR Congo)

8 September 2025 2026 World Cup qualification	Zambia	0–2	Morocco	Ndola, Zambia
15:00 UTC+2		Report (FIFA); Report (CAF)	En-Nesyri 7'; Igamane 47'	Stadium: Levy Mwanawasa Stadium; Attendance: 49,800; Referee: Djindo Louis Houngnandande (Benin)

October 2025 2026 World Cup qualification	Eritrea	Cancelled	Morocco

9 October 2025 Friendly	Morocco	1–0	Bahrain	Rabat, Morocco
20:00 UTC+1	El Yamiq 90+4'	Report		Stadium: Prince Moulay Abdellah Stadium; Referee: Sadok Selmi (Tunisia)

14 October 2025 2026 World Cup qualification	Morocco	1–0	Congo	Rabat, Morocco
20:00 UTC+1	En-Nesyri 63'	Report		Stadium: Prince Moulay Abdellah Stadium; Referee: Abdel Aziz Bouh (Mauritania)

14 November 2025 Friendly	Morocco	1–0	Mozambique	Tangier, Morocco
20:00 UTC+1	Ounahi 7'	Report		Stadium: Ibn Battouta Stadium; Attendance: 60,000; Referee: Moussa Diou (Mauritania)

18 November 2025 Friendly	Morocco	4–0	Uganda	Tangier, Morocco
20:00 UTC+1	Achai 4' (o.g.); Saibari 33'; Rahimi 79' (pen.); El Khannouss 88'	Report		Stadium: Ibn Battouta Stadium

2 December 2025 2025 FIFA Arab Cup GS	Morocco	3–1	Comoros	Al Rayyan, Qatar
15:00 UTC+3	Bouftini 5'; Tissoudali 11'; El Berkaoui 45+4'	Report	Boulacsoute 56' (o.g.)	Stadium: Khalifa International Stadium; Attendance: 10,246; Referee: Ma Ning (China)

5 December 2025 2025 FIFA Arab Cup GS	Oman	0–0	Morocco	Al Rayyan, Qatar
17:30 UTC+3		Report		Stadium: Education City Stadium; Attendance: 37,996; Referee: Juan Gabriel Benítez (Paraguay)

8 December 2025 2025 FIFA Arab Cup GS	Morocco	1–0	Saudi Arabia	Lusail, Qatar
20:00 UTC+3	El Berkaoui 11'	Report		Stadium: Lusail Stadium; Attendance: 78,131; Referee: Mario Escobar (Guatemala)

11 December 2025 2025 FIFA Arab Cup QF	Morocco	1–0	Syria	Al Rayyan, Qatar
17:30 UTC+3	Azaro 79'	Report		Stadium: Khalifa International Stadium; Attendance: 39,167; Referee: Cristián Garay (Chile)

15 December 2025 2025 FIFA Arab Cup SF	Morocco	3–0	United Arab Emirates	Al Rayyan, Qatar
17:30 UTC+3	El Berkaoui 28'; El Mahdioui 83'; Hamdallah 90+2'	Report		Stadium: Khalifa International Stadium; Attendance: 33,898; Referee: Espen Eskås (Norway)

18 December 2025 2025 FIFA Arab Cup Final	Jordan	2–3 (a.e.t.)	Morocco	Lusail, Qatar
19:00 UTC+3	Olwan 48', 68' (pen.)	Report	Tannane 4'; Hamdallah 88', 100'	Stadium: Lusail Stadium; Attendance: 84,517; Referee: Glenn Nyberg (Sweden)

21 December 2025 2025 AFCON GS	Morocco	2–0	Comoros	Rabat, Morocco
20:00 UTC+1	Brahim 55'; El Kaabi 74'	Report		Stadium: Prince Moulay Abdellah Stadium; Attendance: 60,180; Referee: Jean-Jacques Ndala Ngambo (DR Congo)

26 December 2025 2025 AFCON GS	Morocco	1–1	Mali	Rabat, Morocco
21:00 UTC+1	Brahim 45+5' (pen.)	Report	Sinayoko 64' (pen.)	Stadium: Prince Moulay Abdellah Stadium; Attendance: 63,844; Referee: Abdou Mefire (Cameroon)

29 December 2025 2025 AFCON GS	Zambia	0–3	Morocco	Rabat, Morocco
20:00 UTC+1		Report	El Kaabi 9', 50'; Brahim 27'	Stadium: Prince Moulay Abdellah Stadium; Attendance: 62,532; Referee: Issa Sy (Senegal)

=== 2026 ===
4 January 2026 2025 AFCON R16	Morocco	1–0	Tanzania	Rabat, Morocco
17:00 UTC+1	Brahim 64'	Report		Stadium: Prince Moulay Abdellah Stadium; Attendance: 63,894; Referee: Boubou Traore (Mali)

9 January 2026 2025 AFCON QF	Cameroon	0–2	Morocco	Rabat, Morocco
20:00 UTC+1		Report	Brahim 26'; Saibari 74'	Stadium: Prince Moulay Abdellah Stadium; Attendance: 64,178; Referee: Dahane Beida (Mauritania)

14 January 2026 2025 AFCON SF	Nigeria	0–0 (a.e.t.) (2–4 p)	Morocco	Rabat, Morocco
21:00 UTC+1		Report		Stadium: Prince Moulay Abdellah Stadium; Attendance: 65,458; Referee: Daniel Nii Laryea (Ghana)
	Penalties
	Onuachu (penalty scored); Chukwueze (penalty missed); Dele-Bashiru (penalty scored); Onyemaechi (penalty missed)		(penalty scored) El Aynaoui; (penalty missed) Igamane; (penalty scored) Ben Seghir; (penalty scored) Hakimi; (penalty scored) En-Nesyri

18 January 2026 2025 AFCON Final	Senegal	0–3; Awarded (Note: The final match originally finished 1–0 for Senegal after extra time. On 17 March 2026, the CAF Appeal Board ruled that Senegal had forfeited the match for temporarily refusing to play and leaving the pitch in protest of a refereeing decision. Pursuant to articles 82 and 84 of the competition regulations, the final was awarded as a 3–0 win for Morocco, thereby retroactively declaring them as 2025 Africa Cup of Nations champions and stripping Senegal of the title. The following day, the Senegalese Football Federation announced it would appeal the decision to the Court of Arbitration for Sport.)	Morocco	Rabat, Morocco
20:00 UTC+1	P. Gueye 94'	Report		Stadium: Prince Moulay Abdellah Stadium; Attendance: 66,526; Referee: Jean-Jacques Ndala (DR Congo)

27 March 2026 Friendly	Morocco	1–1	Ecuador	Madrid, Spain
20:15 UTC+1	El Aynaoui 88'	Report	Yeboah 48'	Stadium: Metropolitano Stadium; Referee: José Luis Munuera Montero (Spain)

31 March 2026 Friendly	Morocco	2–1	Paraguay	Lens, France
19:00 UTC+1	El Khannouss 48'; El Aynaoui 53'	Report	Caballero 88'	Stadium: Stade Bollaert-Delelis; Attendance: 38,000; Referee: Eric Wattellier (France)

26 May 2026 Friendly	Morocco	5–0	Burundi	Salé, Morocco
12:00 UTC+1	El Kaabi 59', 63'; Bentayeb 71'; Benjdida 80', 90'	Report		Stadium: Mohammed VI Football Complex; Attendance: Behind closed doors

2 June 2026 Friendly	Morocco	4–0	Madagascar	Rabat, Morocco
18:00 UTC+1	Saibari 4', 25'; Rahimi 78' (pen.); El Kaabi 87'	Report		Stadium: Prince Moulay Abdellah Stadium; Referee: Boubou Traoré (Mali)

7 June 2026 Friendly	Morocco	1–1	Norway	Harrison, United States
15:00 UTC−4	Brahim 8'	Report	Ødegaard 75'	Stadium: Sports Illustrated Stadium; Referee: Pierre-Luc Lauziere (Canada)

13 June 2026 2026 FIFA World Cup GS (Group C)	Brazil	1–1	Morocco	East Rutherford, United States
18:00 UTC−4	Vinícius 32'	(Note: "Brazil vs Morocco | First Stage | FIFA World Cup 2026". FIFA. Retrieved June 13, 2026.; "Match Report – Group C – Brazil v. Morocco". FIFA. June 14, 2026. Retrieved June 14, 2026.; "Post match summary report – Group C – Brazil v. Morocco". FIFA. June 14, 2026. Retrieved June 14, 2026.)	Saibari 21'	Stadium: MetLife Stadium; Attendance: 80,663; Referee: Slavko Vinčić (Slovenia)

19 June 2026 2026 FIFA World Cup GS (Group C)	Scotland	0–1	Morocco	Foxborough, United States
18:00 UTC−4		Report	Saibari 2'	Stadium: Gillette Stadium; Attendance: 64,146; Referee: Ilgiz Tantashev (Uzbekistan)

24 June 2026 2026 FIFA World Cup GS (Group C)	Morocco	4–2	Haiti	Atlanta, United States
18:00 UTC−4	Hakimi 39'; Saibari 45+1'; Rahimi 78'; Yassine 89'	Report	Bounou 10' (o.g.); Isidor 43'	Stadium: Mercedes-Benz Stadium; Attendance: 68,239; Referee: Danny Makkelie (Netherlands)

29 June 2026 2026 FIFA World Cup (R32)	Netherlands	1–1 (a.e.t.) (2–3 p)	Morocco	Guadalupe, Mexico
19:00 UTC−6	Gakpo 72'	Report	Diop 90+1'	Stadium: Estadio BBVA; Attendance: 51,243; Referee: Wilton Sampaio (Brazil)
	Penalties
	Koopmeiners (penalty scored); Kluivert (penalty missed); Weghorst (penalty scored); Timber (penalty missed); Summerville (penalty missed)		El Aynaoui (penalty missed); Rahimi (penalty scored); Talbi (penalty scored); Hakimi (penalty missed); Saibari (penalty scored)

4 July 2026 2026 FIFA World Cup (R16)	Canada	0–3	Morocco	Houston, United States
12:00 UTC−5		Report	Ounahi 50', 82'; Rahimi 90+8'	Stadium: NRG Stadium; Attendance: 68,777; Referee: Michael Oliver (England)

9 July 2026 2026 FIFA World Cup (QF)	France	2–0	Morocco	Foxborough, United States
12:00 UTC−5	Mbappé 60'; Dembélé 66'	Report		Stadium: Gillette Stadium; Attendance: 63,811; Referee: Facundo Tello (Argentina)

25 September 2026 2027 AFCON Q	Morocco	2–0	Gabon	Rabat, Morocco
19:00 UTC+0	Mazraoui 36'; Rahimi 84'	Report		Stadium: Prince Moulay Abdellah Stadium; Referee: Abongile Tom (South Africa)

29 September 2026 2027 AFCON Q	Lesotho	0–2	Morocco	Bloemfontein, South Africa
15:00 UTC+2		Report	Díaz 45'; Ounahi 82'	Stadium: Free State Stadium; Referee: Abdou Abdel Mefire (Cameroon)

4 October 2026 Friendly	Morocco	1–1	Mali	Tangier, Morocco
18:00 UTC+0	Ezzalzouli 35' (pen.)	Report	Diarra 77'	Stadium: Ibn Battouta Stadium; Referee: Beida Dahane (Mauritania)

13 November 2026 2027 AFCON Q	Morocco	5–1	Niger	Casablanca, Morocco
20:00 UTC+0	Zabiri 4'; Hakimi 27', 45+3'; En-Nesyri 77'; Oufkir 90'	Report	Abdourahmane 41'	Stadium: Stade Mohammed V Referee: Omar Artan (Somalia)

17 November 2026 2027 AFCON Q	Niger	v	Morocco	Rabat, Morocco
				Stadium: Prince Moulay Abdellah Stadium

=== 2027 ===
24 March 2027 2027 AFCON Q	Gabon	v	Morocco	TBD, Gabon
				Stadium: TBD

28 March 2027 2027 AFCON Q	Morocco	v	Lesotho	TBD, Morocco
				Stadium: TBD

== Head to head records ==
Head to head records
Opponent	P	W	D	L	GF	GA	W%	D%	L%
Algeria	1	0	1	0	2	2	0	100	0
Angola	2	2	0	0	3	0	100	0	0
Belgium	1	1	0	0	2	0	100	0	0
Benin	1	1	0	0	1	0	100	0	0
Brazil	2	1	1	0	3	2	50	50	0
Burkina Faso	2	2	0	0	2	0	100	0	0
Burundi	2	2	0	0	6	0	100	0	0
Cameroon	2	2	0	0	6	0	100	0	0
Canada	2	2	0	0	5	1	100	0	0
Cape Verde	1	0	1	0	0	0	0	100	0
Central African Republic	4	4	0	0	15	1	100	0	0
Chile	1	1	0	0	2	0	100	0	0
Comoros	3	3	0	0	7	1	100	0	0
Congo	2	2	0	0	7	0	100	0	0
Croatia	2	0	1	1	1	2	0	50	50
DR Congo	5	2	3	0	10	5	40	60	0
Ecuador	1	0	1	0	1	1	0	100	0
Egypt	1	0	0	1	1	2	0	0	100
France	2	0	0	2	0	4	0	0	100
Gabon	4	3	1	0	13	4	75	25	0
Georgia	1	1	0	0	3	0	100	0	0
Ghana	2	2	0	0	2	0	100	0	0
Guinea	2	2	0	0	7	1	100	0	0
Guinea-Bissau	2	2	0	0	8	0	100	0	0
Haiti	1	1	0	0	4	2	100	0	0
Ivory Coast	1	0	1	0	1	1	0	100	0
Jordan	2	2	0	0	7	2	100	0	0
Kenya	1	0	0	1	0	1	0	0	100
Lesotho	3	3	0	0	10	0	100	0	0
Liberia	2	2	0	0	5	0	100	0	0
Madagascar	2	2	0	0	7	2	100	0	0
Malawi	1	1	0	0	2	1	100	0	0
Mali	3	1	2	0	4	2	33.33	66.67	0
Mauritania	2	0	2	0	0	0	0	100	0
Niger	3	3	0	0	12	2	100	0	0
Netherlands	1	0	1	0	1	1	0	100	0
Norway	1	0	1	0	0	0	0	100	0
Oman	1	0	1	0	0	0	0	100	0
Palestine	1	1	0	0	4	0	100	0	0
Paraguay	2	1	1	0	2	1	50	50	0
Peru	1	0	1	0	0	0	0	100	0
Portugal	1	1	0	0	1	0	100	0	0
Rwanda	1	0	1	0	0	0	0	100	0
Saudi Arabia	2	2	0	0	2	0	100	0	0
Scotland	1	1	0	0	1	0	100	0	0
Senegal	3	2	1	0	7	2	66.67	33.33	0
Sierra Leone	1	1	0	0	3	1	100	0	0
South Africa	3	1	0	2	3	5	33.33	0	66.67
Spain	1	0	1	0	0	0	0	100	0
Sudan	2	2	0	0	5	0	100	0	0
Syria	1	1	0	0	1	0	100	0	0
Tanzania	4	4	0	0	8	0	100	0	0
Togo	1	1	0	0	1	0	100	0	0
Tunisia	1	1	0	0	2	0	100	0	0
Uganda	2	2	0	0	9	2	100	0	0
United Arab Emirates	1	1	0	0	3	0	100	0	0
United States	1	0	0	1	0	3	0	0	100
Zambia	6	6	0	0	14	3	100	0	0
Totals	108	78	22	8	226	57	72.22	20.37	7.41
