= 2017 CISM World Football Cup =

كأس العالم العسكرية الثانية لكرة القدم 2017

Tournament details
- Host country: Oman
- City: Muscat
- Dates: 15–28 January
- Teams: 16 (from 4 confederations)
- Venues: 3 (in 2 host cities)

Final positions
- Champions: Oman (1st title)
- Runners-up: Qatar
- Third place: Syria
- Fourth place: Egypt

Tournament statistics
- Matches played: 32
- Goals scored: 90 (2.81 per match)
- Top scorer(s): (Syria) Mohammed Al Wakid (Egypt) Ahmed El Sheikh (5 goals each)
- Best player: (Qatar) Abdullah Al-Haddad
- Best goalkeeper: (Oman) Faiz Al-Rushaidi

The 2017 CISM World Football Cup is the 2nd edition of the CISM World Football Cup and take part in Muscat, capital of Oman. Oman the hosts won the tournament for the first time, defeating Qatar 4–1 in a penalty shoot-out after the final finished goalless following extra time. Syria came third and Egypt fourth, while defending champions Iraq did not enter.

== Venues ==
Seeb	Muscat
Al-Seeb Stadium	Sultan Qaboos Stadium
Capacity: 13,400	Capacity: 30,000
Muscat	2017 CISM World Football Cup is located in Oman
Royal Oman Police Stadium	2017 CISM World Football Cup is located in Oman
Capacity: 12,000	2017 CISM World Football Cup is located in Oman

== Match officials ==
The following referees were chosen for the 2017 CISM World Football Cup.

Referees

- (Algeria) Mohamed Benouza
- (Bahrain) Ali Al-Samahiji
- (Egypt) Ibrahim Nour El Din
- (France) Benoît Millot
- (Germany) Stefan Treiber
- (Guinea) Aboubacar Bangoura
- (Iran) Mohamed Hossein Zahedifar
- (Republic of Ireland) Eoghan O'Shea
- (North Korea) In-Chol Kang
- (North Korea) Kim Song Ho
- (Oman) Khaled Al-Sheddi
- (Oman) Zakri Nasser Hashil Al-Hinaai
- (Oman) Omar Al-Yaqoubi
- (Oman) Qassim Al-Hatmi
- (Oman) Yaqoub Abdul Baqi
- (Poland) Marek Marcinkowski
- (Qatar) Saoud Ali Al Adba
- (United Arab Emirates) Adel Al-Naqbi
- (Syria) Mohamad Abdulah
- (Saudi Arabia) Mohammed Al-Qarni
- (Guinea) Assetou Keita

Assistant referees

- (Bahrain) Abdulla Al Rowaimi
- (Egypt) Mahmoud Abu Elregal
- (France) Yohann Tetart
- (Germany) Michael Olligschläger
- (Mali) Djeneba Dembele
- (Republic of Ireland) Deckie Toland
- (Oman) Hamed Al-Gafri
- (Oman) Nasser Ambusaidi
- (Oman) Rashad Al-Hakmani
- (Poland) Ryszard Walendziak
- (Qatar) Saoud Ahmed Al-Maqaleh
- (Saudi Arabia) Abdulah Al-Shalwai
- (Syria) Zakaria Kanat
- (United Arab Emirates) Abdullah Al-Naqbi
- (Oman) Azane Al-Qateti
- (Iran) Hasan Zeheiri

== Group stage ==
The teams are ranked according to points (3 points for a win, 1 point for a draw, 0 points for a loss). Group winners and runners-up advance to the quarter-finals.

All times are local, GST (UTC+4).

=== Group A ===
Team	Pld	W	D	L	GF	GA	GD	Pts
Oman	3	2	1	0	9	3	+6	7
Bahrain	3	1	2	0	3	2	+1	5
Guinea	3	0	2	1	3	8	−5	2
France	3	0	1	2	4	6	−2	1

Source: CISM
15 January 2017
19:30

Oman	5–0	Guinea
Al-Muqbali 20' (pen.), 55'; Al-Musalami 59'; Taqi 63', 67'	Report

Sultan Qaboos Stadium, Muscat
Referee: Mohamed Benouza (Algeria)
16 January 2017
17:00

Bahrain	1–0	France
Madan 50'	Report

Sultan Qaboos Stadium, Muscat

18 January 2017
17:00

France	2–2	Guinea
El Hajri 19' (pen.); Mihoubi 80'	Report	39' (pen.) Sow; 84' Barry

Sultan Qaboos Stadium, Muscat
Referee: Ibrahim Nour El Din (Egypt)
18 January 2017
20:00

Oman	1–1	Bahrain
Al-Yahmadi 55'	Report	32' Abdullatif

Sultan Qaboos Stadium, Muscat
Referee: Mohamed Hossein Zahedifar (Iran)

20 January 2017
20:00

France	2–3	Oman
Dumontant 6'; Friedrich 88'	Report	21' Said; 27', 35' Al-Farsi

Sultan Qaboos Stadium, Muscat
Referee: Mohamad Abdullah (Syria)
20 January 2017
20:00

Guinea	1–1	Bahrain
I. K. Camara 39'	Report	58' Abdullatif

Al-Seeb Stadium, Seeb
Referee: Ibrahim Nour El Din (Egypt)

=== Group B ===
Team	Pld	W	D	L	GF	GA	GD	Pts
Algeria	3	3	0	0	7	3	+4	9
Germany	3	1	1	1	2	2	0	4
North Korea	3	1	0	2	3	3	0	3
Iran	3	0	1	2	1	5	−4	1

Source: CISM
16 January 2017
17:00

Algeria	2–1	Germany
Meziane 33'; Khadir 85'	Report	62' Stahl

Al-Seeb Stadium, Seeb
Referee: Qassim Al-Hatmi (Oman)
16 January 2017
20:00

Iran	0–2	North Korea
	Report	46' An; 54' So

Al-Seeb Stadium, Seeb
Referee: Saoud Ali Al Adba (Qatar)

18 January 2017
17:00

Algeria	3–1	Iran
Hamia 27', 42'; Ferhani 36'	Report	45+2' (pen.) Gholamrezapour

Royal Oman Police Stadium, Muscat
Referee: Adel Al-Naqbi (UAE)
18 January 2017
20:00

North Korea	0–1	Germany
	Report	23' Stahl

Royal Oman Police Stadium, Muscat
Referee: Mohammed Al-Qarni (Saudi Arabia)

20 January 2017
17:00

North Korea	1–2	Algeria
Sim 12'	Report	11' Harrag; 54' Meziane

Sultan Qaboos Stadium, Muscat
Referee: Ali Al-Samahiji (Bahrain)
20 January 2017
17:00

Germany	0–0	Iran
	Report

Al-Seeb Stadium, Seeb
Referee: Benoît Millot (France)

=== Group C ===
Team	Pld	W	D	L	GF	GA	GD	Pts
Qatar	3	2	1	0	8	1	+7	7
Mali	3	1	2	0	5	1	+4	5
Republic of Ireland	3	1	1	1	7	5	+2	4
United States	3	0	0	3	2	15	−13	0

Source: CISM
17 January 2017
17:00

Republic of Ireland	1–1	Mali
Horgan 17'	Report	45' Diallo

Royal Oman Police Stadium, Muscat
Referee: Ali Al-Samahiji (Bahrain)
17 January 2017
20:00

Qatar	5–1	United States
Ngom 12', 79'; Ali 49'; Odoi 53', 85'	Report	84' Downey

Royal Oman Police Stadium, Muscat
Referee: Mohamad Abdullah (Syria)

19 January 2017
17:00

Republic of Ireland	0–3	Qatar
	Report	41' Silva; 63' Ndifon; 82' Ngom

Al-Seeb Stadium, Seeb
Referee: (DPR Korea)
19 January 2017
20:00

United States	0–4	Mali
	Report	30' Moussa; 38', 42' Sissoko; 77' Traoré

Al-Seeb Stadium, Seeb
Referee: Marek Marcinkowski (Poland)

21 January 2017
17:00

United States	1–6	Republic of Ireland
Jesus 86'	Report	15', 60' Walsh; 51' (pen.), 58' Fox; 85' Shortt; 90+2' Gannon

Sultan Qaboos Stadium, Muscat
Referee: Stefan Treiber (Germany)
21 January 2017
17:00

Mali	0–0	Qatar
	Report

Al-Seeb Stadium, Seeb
Referee: Mohamed Benouza (Algeria)

=== Group D ===
Team	Pld	W	D	L	GF	GA	GD	Pts
Syria	3	2	1	0	4	0	+4	7
Egypt	3	1	2	0	5	1	+4	5
Poland	3	1	1	1	7	3	+4	4
Canada	3	0	0	3	1	14	−13	0

Source: CISM
17 January 2017
17:00

Egypt	1–1	Poland
El Sheikh 69'	Report	48' Łuczak

Al-Seeb Stadium, Seeb
Referee: Benoît Millot (France)
17 January 2017
20:00

Canada	0–3	Syria
	Report	2' Al-Kadoor; 19' Omari; 33' Al-Khouli

Al-Seeb Stadium, Seeb
Referee: Yaqoub Abdul Baqi (Oman)

19 January 2017
17:00

Egypt	4–0	Canada
Eid 33' (pen.); Paulo 39'; El Sheikh 64'; Zakaria 83'	Report

Royal Oman Police Stadium, Muscat
Referee: Omar Al-Yaqoubi (Oman)
19 January 2017
20:00

Syria	1–0	Poland
Hamadko 12'	Report

Royal Oman Police Stadium, Muscat
Referee: Aboubacar Bangoura (Guinea)

21 January 2017
20:00

Syria	0–0	Egypt
	Report

Sultan Qaboos Stadium, Muscat
Referee: Yaqoub Abdul Baqi (Oman)
21 January 2017
20:00

Poland	6–1	Canada
Kosiński 12' (pen.), 90'; Łuczak 31', 81'; Wachowiak 40'; Żeno 73'	Report	28' Sabadoz

Al-Seeb Stadium, Seeb
Referee: Eoghan O'Shea (Ireland)

== Knockout stage ==
Quarter-finals
24 January – Muscat
Oman	5
Mali	0
24 January – Muscat
Algeria	1
Egypt (a.e.t.)	2
24 January – Seeb
Qatar (p)	0 (4)
Bahrain	0 (2)
24 January – Seeb
Syria	2
Germany	1

Semi-finals
26 January – Muscat
Oman (p)	2 (4)
Egypt	2 (1)
26 January – Muscat
Qatar (p)	2 (4)
Syria	2 (2)

Final
28 January – Muscat
Oman (p)	0 (4)
Qatar	0 (1)
Third place
28 January – Muscat
Egypt	2 (5)
Syria (p)	2 (6)

=== Quarter-finals ===
24 January 2017
17:00

Oman	5–0	Mali
Al-Khaldi 4'; Al-Mukhaini 16'; Taqi 34', 90'; Darwish 85'	Report

Sultan Qaboos Stadium, Muscat
Referee: Saoud Ali Al Adba (Qatar)

24 January 2017
20:30

Algeria	1–2 (a.e.t.)	Egypt
Hamia 51'	Report	35' Marey; 120' El Sheikh

Sultan Qaboos Stadium, Muscat
Referee: Benoît Millot (France)

24 January 2017
17:00

Qatar	0–0 (a.e.t.)	Bahrain
	Report
Penalties
Anderson (penalty scored); Morera (penalty missed); Ngom (penalty scored); Odoi (penalty scored); Ndifon (penalty scored)	4–2	(penalty scored) Helal; (penalty missed) Muthanna; (penalty scored) Saeed; (penalty missed) Hasan

Al-Seeb Stadium, Seeb
Referee: Qassim Al-Hatmi (Oman)

24 January 2017
20:30

Syria	2–1	Germany
Al Wakid 31' (pen.), 90'	Report	Dick 12' (pen.)

Al-Seeb Stadium, Seeb
Referee: Adel Al-Naqbi (UAE)

=== Semi-finals ===
26 January 2017
17:00

Oman	2–2 (a.e.t.)	Egypt
Al-Muqbali 86' (pen.), 94'	Report	72' El Sheikh; 96' Samy
Penalties
Al-Muqbali (penalty scored); Al-Farsi (penalty scored); Al-Mukhaini (penalty scored); Al-Yahmadi (penalty scored)	4–1	(penalty missed) Paulo; (penalty scored) El Sheikh; (penalty missed) Samy

Sultan Qaboos Stadium, Muscat
Referee: Mohamed Hossein Zahedifar (Iran)

26 January 2017
20:30

Qatar	2–2 (a.e.t.)	Syria
Ngom 30'; Keïta 45+2'	Report	Al Wakid 15' (pen.), 23' (pen.)
Penalties
Morera (penalty scored); Anderson (penalty scored); Ngom (penalty missed); Odoi (penalty scored); Diallo (penalty scored)	4–2	(penalty scored) Awad; (penalty missed) Shaib; (penalty missed) Omari; (penalty scored) Al-Fateh

Sultan Qaboos Stadium, Muscat
Referee: Ali Al-Samahiji (Bahrain)

=== Third place play-off ===
28 January 2017
17:00

Egypt	2–2	Syria
Soliman 2'; El Sheikh 61'	Report	35' Hamadko; 90+1' Al Wakid
Penalties
Soliman (penalty scored); A. El-Sayed (penalty scored); Gamal (penalty missed); Tawfik (penalty scored); El Sheikh (penalty scored); Paulo (penalty scored); El-Sayed (penalty missed)	5–6	(penalty scored) Al-Kadoor; (penalty scored) Hamadko; (penalty missed) Belal; (penalty scored) Bawadkji; (penalty scored) Al Wakid; (penalty scored) Barakat; (penalty scored) Aqaad

Al-Seeb Stadium, Seeb
Referee: Adel Al-Naqbi (United Arab Emirates)

=== Final ===
28 January 2017
20:15

Oman	0–0 (a.e.t.)	Qatar
	Report
Penalties
Al-Farsi (penalty scored); Al-Yahmadi (penalty scored); Al-Mukhaini (penalty scored); Al-Khaldi (penalty scored)	4–1	(penalty scored) Moreira; (penalty missed) Anderson; (penalty missed) Ngom

Sultan Qaboos Stadium, Muscat
Referee: Benoît Millot (France)

== Statistics ==
=== Goalscorers ===
5 goals

- (Egypt) Ahmed El Sheikh
- (Syria) Mohammed Al Wakid

4 goals

- (Oman) Abdul Aziz Al-Muqbali
- (Oman) Mohammed Taqi
- (Qatar) Abdul-Kader Ngom

3 goals

- (Algeria) Mohamed Amine Hamia
- (Poland) Mateusz Łuczak

2 goals

- (Algeria) Abderrahmane Meziane
- (Bahrain) Ismail Abdullatif
- (Germany) Florian Stahl
- (Republic of Ireland) Derek Walsh
- (Republic of Ireland) Ricky Fox
- (Mali) Amadou Diallo
- (Mali) Sambou Sissoko
- (Oman) Saud Al-Farsi
- (Poland) Damian Kosiński
- (Qatar) Justice Odoi
- (Syria) Mohammed Hamadko

1 goal

- (Algeria) Houari Ferhani
- (Algeria) Chamseddine Harrag
- (Algeria) Sofiane Khadir
- (Bahrain) Ali Madan
- (Canada) Stephen Sabadoz
- (Egypt) Ahmed Eid
- (Egypt) Amr Marey
- (Egypt) Paulo
- (Egypt) Ahmed Samy
- (Egypt) Salah Soliman
- (Egypt) Moamen Zakaria
- (France) Kévin Dumontant
- (France) Jawad El Hajri
- (France) William Friedrich
- (France) Abdelkader Mihoubi
- (Germany) Andreas Dick
- (Guinea) Ibrahima Kassory Camara
- (Guinea) Adboulaye Sow
- (Guinea) Aliou Barry
- (Iran) Ali Gholamrezapour
- (Republic of Ireland) Sean Gannon
- (Republic of Ireland) Mark Horgan
- (Republic of Ireland) Graig Shortt
- (North Korea) An Il-bom
- (North Korea) Sim Hyon-jin
- (North Korea) So Hyon-uk
- (Mali) Adama Traoré
- (Oman) Mohsin Al-Khaldi
- (Oman) Juma Darwish
- (Oman) Saad Al-Mukhaini
- (Oman) Mohammed Al-Musalami
- (Oman) Jameel Al-Yahmadi
- (Oman) Qasim Said
- (Poland) Marcina Żeno
- (Poland) Mateusz Wachowiak
- (Qatar) Omar Ali
- (Qatar) Bréhima Keïta
- (Qatar) Luke Ndifon
- (Qatar) Jonathan Silva
- (Syria) Zakaria Al-Kadoor
- (Syria) Muayad Al-Khouli
- (Syria) Osama Omari
- (United States) Caleb Downey
- (United States) Ramos Jesus

=== Awards ===
Highest Scorers

- (Egypt) Ahmed El Sheikh
- (Syria) Mohammed Al Wakid

Man of the Competition

- (Qatar) Abdullah Al-Haddad

Best Goalkeeper

- (Oman) Faiz Al-Rushaidi

Fair Play of the tournament

- Mali

=== Tournament team rankings ===
As per statistical convention in football, matches decided in extra time are counted as wins and losses, while matches decided by penalty shoot-outs are counted as draws.

Pos	Team	Pld	W	D	L	GF	GA	GD	Pts	Final result
1	Oman	6	3	3	0	16	5	+11	12	Champions
2	Qatar	6	2	4	0	10	3	+7	10	Runner-up
3	Syria	6	3	3	0	10	5	+5	12	Third place
4	Egypt	6	2	4	0	11	6	+5	10	Fourth place
5	Algeria	4	3	0	1	8	5	+3	9	Eliminated in Quarter-finals
6	Bahrain	4	1	3	0	3	2	+1	6	Eliminated in Quarter-finals
7	Mali	4	1	2	1	5	6	−1	5	Eliminated in Quarter-finals
8	Germany	4	1	1	2	3	4	−1	4	Eliminated in Quarter-finals
9	Poland	3	1	1	1	7	3	+4	4	Eliminated in Group stage
10	Republic of Ireland	3	1	1	1	7	5	+2	4	Eliminated in Group stage
11	North Korea	3	1	0	2	3	3	0	3	Eliminated in Group stage
12	Guinea	3	0	2	1	3	8	−5	2	Eliminated in Group stage
13	France	3	0	1	2	4	6	−2	1	Eliminated in Group stage
14	Iran	3	0	1	2	1	5	−4	1	Eliminated in Group stage
15	United States	3	0	0	3	2	15	−13	0	Eliminated in Group stage
16	Canada	3	0	0	3	1	14	−13	0	Eliminated in Group stage

Source: CISM

== Media ==
=== Broadcasting ===
Territory	Channel	Ref
Egypt	DMC Sports	
Oman	Oman TV Sport; Oman TV Live	
Syria	Syrian Satellite	
