= Al-Rushaidi =

Al-Rushaidi is an Arabic surname. Notable people with the surname include:

- Faiz Al-Rushaidi (born 1988), Omani football goalkeeper
- Thani Al-Rushaidi (born 1995), Omani football defender
- Zeyad Al-Rushaidi (born 2011), Omani Public figure
