= Fodé Sylla =

Fodé Sylla may refer to:

- Fodé Sylla (politician) (born 1963), French politician
- Fodé Moussa Sylla (born 1988), Guinean footballer
- Fodé Sylla (footballer) (born 2006), French football midfielder for Lens
- Foday Sillah (sprinter), a Sierra Leonian Olympic athlete
- Foday Sillah (marabout), a 19th century Gambian religious and military leader
