= Nassuir Hamidou =

Footballer (born 2000)

Personal information
- Full name: Dine Nasuir Hamidou Ali
- Date of birth: 21 July 2000 (age 26)
- Place of birth: Marseille, France
- Height: 1.87 m (6 ft 2 in)
- Position: Right-back

Team information
- Current team: Istres

Youth career
- Côte Bleue

Senior career*
Years	Team	Apps	(Gls)
2020–2022	Côte Bleue	5	(0)
2022–2023	Marignane II	1	(0)
2023–2025	Rousset	40	(4)
2025–2026	Aubagne Air Bel	17	(1)
2026–	Istres	0	(0)

International career^{‡}
2025–	Comoros	4	(1)
- * Club domestic league appearances and goals as of 23 June 2026 ‡ National team caps and goals as of 22:45, 8 December 2025 (UTC)

Dine Nassuir Hamidou Ali (born 21 July 2000) is a professional footballer who plays as a right-back for the Championnat National 1 club Istres. Born in France, he plays for the Comoros national team.

== Club career ==
Hamidou began his senior career with Côte Bleue in the Championnat National 3. He moved to Rousset in 2023, and helped them win the 2024–25 Championnat National 3.

== International career ==
Born in France, Hamidou is of Comorian descent. He made the final Comoros national team for the 2025 FIFA Arab Cup.

=== International goals ===
Scores and results list Comoros goal tally first.

No	Date	Venue	Opponent	Score	Result	Competition
1.	8 December 2025	Stadium 974, Doha, Qatar	Oman	1–2	1–2	2025 FIFA Arab Cup

== Honours ==
Rousset

- Championnat National 3: 2024–25
