= Riad Ouedraogo =

French footballer (born 1996)

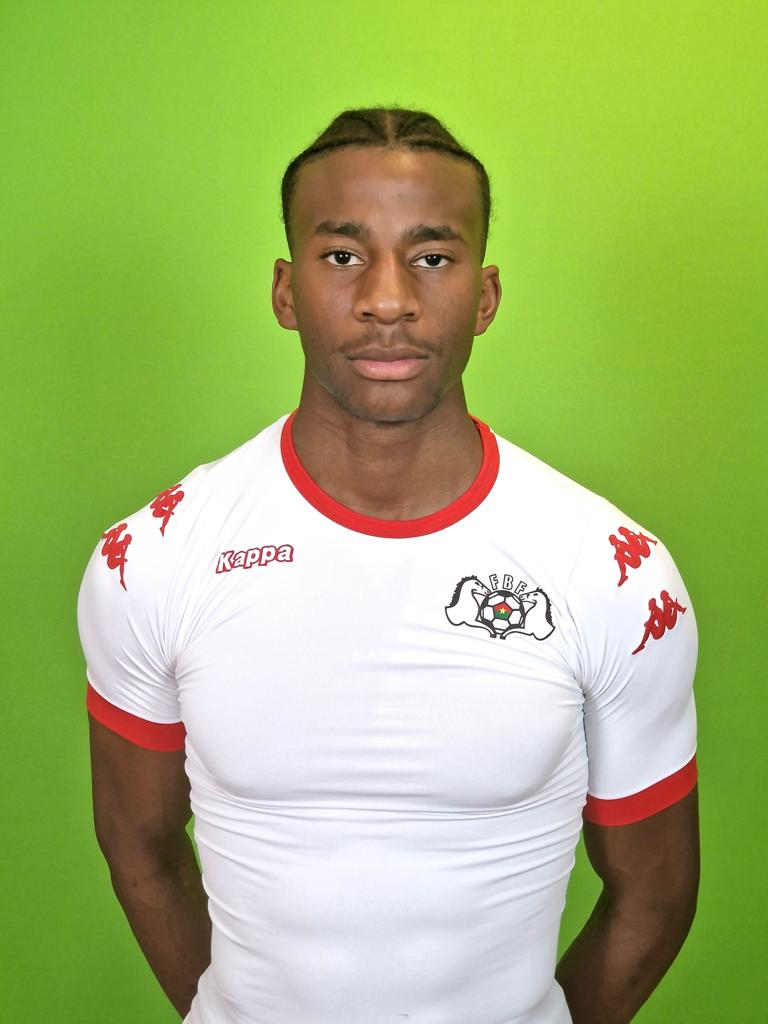

Personal information
- Full name: Riad Ousmane Niande Ouedraogo
- Date of birth: 17 July 1996 (age 30)
- Place of birth: Sèvres, France
- Height: 1.96 m (6 ft 5 in)
- Position: Defensive midfielder

Youth career
- 2012–2013: SC Bastia
- 2013–2014: Paris FC II
- 2014–2016: QPR

Senior career*
Years	Team	Apps	(Gls)
2016–2017	Cádiz B	22	(2)
2017–2018	Whitehawk	19	(1)
2019–2020	Alcalá	18	(0)
2020–2021	FC Plessis Robinson	14	(0)
2021–2022	Montargis	8	(0)
2022–2023	Jeunesse Esch	1	(0)
2024–2025	UN Käerjéng 97	5	(0)

International career
2013	Burkina Faso U18	4	(0)
2014	Burkina Faso U20	3	(0)
2017	Burkina Faso U23	5	(0)
- * Club domestic league appearances and goals as of 29 July 2024

Riad Ouedraogo (born 17 July 1996) is a footballer who last played as a defensive midfielder for UN Käerjéng 97.

== Club career ==
Ouedraogo began his career in the France with SC Bastia U19. He joined Paris FC II on 3 July 2013, for the 2013–14 season. Ouedraogo signed for English club QPR U21 in 2014. He moved to Spain and joined Cádiz B in 2016.

On 1 July 2017, Ouedraogo returned to Whitehawk in England, on a deal for the rest of the season. He joined Tercera División club Alcalá on August 23, 2018. He moved back to France and joined FC Plessis Robinson in early 2020 and made his first start on 4 October 2020, in a 2–0 Coupe de France victory over Versailles.

Ouedraogo signed for Montargis in July 2021, who were competing in Championnat National at the time.

In July 2022, Ouedraogo moved to Luxembourg and signed a two-year contract with BGL Ligue side Jeunesse Esch. He terminated his contract and left the club after a month, making only one appearance for the club.

On 20 January 2024, Luxembourgish BGL Ligue side UN Käerjéng 97 confirmed that they had signed Ouedraogo.

== International career ==
Born in France, Ouedraogo is of Burkina Faso descent and has represented Burkina Faso internationally at youth level. Ouedraogo has been called up to play for both the Burkina Faso U20 and the Burkina Faso U23.

== Career statistics ==
As of match played 29 July 2024

Appearances and goals by club, season and competition
Club	Season	League			Cup		Total	
Club	Season	Division	Apps	Goals	Apps	Goals	Apps	Goals
Montargis	2021–22	Championnat National 3	8	0	0	0	8	0
Jeunesse Esch	2022–23	BGL Ligue	1	0	0	0	1	0
UN Käerjéng 97	2023–24	BGL Ligue	5	0	0	0	5	0
Career total			14	0	0	0	14	0
