= Seif Dine Hraoubia =

French footballer (born 2003)

Personal information
- Full name: Seif Dine Hraoubia
- Date of birth: 27 January 2003 (age 23)
- Place of birth: Orléans, France
- Height: 1.93 m (6 ft 4 in)
- Position: Centre back

Team information
- Current team: Selangor
- Number: 41

Youth career
- 2017-2018: US Orleans
- 2018-2019: Saint-Prive Saint-Hilaire U19

Senior career*
Years	Team	Apps	(Gls)
2020–2021	CA Pithiviers	15	(2)
2021–2022	Red Star B	12	(1)
2022–2023	USM Montargis B	13	(1)
2023–2024	Montargis	2	(0)
2025-	Selangor	1	(0)
- * Club domestic league appearances and goals as of 01:12, 9 May 2025 (UTC)

Seif Dine Hraoubia (born 27 January 2003) is a French professional footballer who plays as a central defender for a Malaysia Super League club Selangor.

== Career ==
Hraoubia was born in Orléans, and began his career with US Orleans youth. In 2019, he joined Saint-Pryvé Saint-Hilaire FC U19 side.

On 1 January 2020, Hraoubia joined CA Pithiviers, After a further one-season spell with CA Pithiviers, Hraoubia signed for Red Star FC B in 2021.

On 7 January 2022, Hraoubia changed clubs and signed for Montargis B. After a year, he was promoted to the first team of Montargis.

On 24 June 2025, Hraoubia signed for Malaysia Super League club Selangor.
