= Soufiane Bouftini =

Moroccan footballer

Personal information
- Date of birth: 3 May 1994 (age 32)
- Place of birth: Azilal, Morocco
- Height: 1.91 m (6 ft 3 in)
- Position: Center back

Team information
- Current team: Al Wasl
- Number: 4

Youth career
- –2014: Union Azilal

Senior career*
Years	Team	Apps	(Gls)
2014–2016	Union Azilal		
2016–2017	Raja Beni Mellal	1	(0)
2017–2021	Hassania Agadir	75	(10)
2021–2022	Al Ahli	19	(2)
2022–	Al Wasl	77	(11)

International career^{‡}
2019–	Morocco A'	8	(2)
2021–	Morocco	8	(1)
Medal record
Men's football
Representing Morocco
African Nations Championship
Winner	2020 Cameroon
FIFA Arab Cup
Winner	2025 Qatar
- * Club domestic league appearances and goals as of 27 September 2024 ‡ National team caps and goals as of 18 December 2025

Soufiane Bouftini (Arabic: سفيان بوفتيني) is a Moroccan professional footballer who plays for UAE Pro League club Al Wasl and the Morocco national team as a defender.

== International career ==
Bouftini debuted for Morocco A' during the 0–0 draw against Algeria A' on 21 September 2019. He scored his first goal during the 4–0 semi-final victory against Cameroon A' at the 2020 African Nations Championship on 3 February 2021. He scored again in the final which Morocco A' won 2–0 against Mali A'.

He played one match for the Morocco B team on 14 October 2025 which was a 1–0 victory against Kuwait.

He debuted for the senior Morocco team during the 4–0 victory against Jordan on 1 December 2021 during the 2021 FIFA Arab Cup, and on 2 December 2025, he scored his first goal for Morocco team during the 3–1 victory against Comoros in the 2025 FIFA Arab Cup group stage. He played every match as Morocco won the competition.

== Career statistics ==
=== International ===
As of match played 18 December 2025

Appearances and goals by national team and year
National team	Year	Apps	Goals
Morocco	2021	2	0
Morocco	2022	0	0
Morocco	2023	0	0
Morocco	2024	0	0
Morocco	2025	6	1
Total		8	1

As of match played 18 December 2025
Morocco score listed first, score column indicates score after each Bouftini goal

List of international goals scored by Sofiane Bouftini
No.	Date	Venue	Cap	Opponent	Score	Result	Competition	Ref.
1	2 December 2025	Khalifa International Stadium, Al Rayyan, Qatar	1	Comoros	1–0	3–1	2025 FIFA Arab Cup	

== Honours ==
Al Wasl

- UAE Pro League: 2023–24
- UAE President's Cup: 2023–24
- Qatar–UAE Super Shield: 2024–25

Morocco

- African Nations Championship: 2020
- FIFA Arab Cup: 2025
