= Anas Makhlouf =

Syrian footballer and coach

Personal information
- Full name: Anas Mohammed Makhlouf
- Date of birth: 12 June 1973 (age 53)
- Place of birth: Damascus, Syria
- Height: 1.85 m (6 ft 1 in)
- Position: Forward

Senior career*
Years	Team	Apps	(Gls)
1995	Al-Majd		
1996–1998	Krylia Sovetov	31	(9)
1999–2000	Shinnik Yaroslavl	4	(0)
2001–2002	Rubin Kazan	10	(1)
2002–2004	Al-Majd		

International career
- Syria U20
- Syria

Managerial career
- 2010: Al-Majd
- 2013: Syria
- 2014–2015: Al-Jaish
- 2015–2016: Salam Zgharta
- 2016–2017: Al-Jaish
- 2017–2018: Tishreen
- 2018–2019: Sohar
- * Club domestic league appearances and goals

Anas Mohammed Makhlouf (Arabic: أَنَس مُحَمَّد مَخلُوف; born on 12 June 1973) is a Syrian football coach and a former player. A forward, he made played for the Syria national team at international level.
