= Karim Mohamed =

Footballer (born 2001)

Personal information
- Full name: Karim Saïd Mohamed
- Date of birth: 2 April 2001 (age 25)
- Place of birth: Beaumont, France
- Height: 1.78 m (5 ft 10 in)
- Position: Right-back

Team information
- Current team: Borgo
- Number: 27

Youth career
- Maringues
- 2011–2018: Clermont

Senior career*
Years	Team	Apps	(Gls)
2018–2022	Clermont II	23	(1)
2021–2022	Clermont	0	(0)
2022–2023	Moulins Yzeure	9	(1)
2023–2024	Le Puy	21	(0)
2024–	Borgo	32	(2)

International career^{‡}
2022	Comoros U20	2	(0)
2024–	Comoros	9	(0)
- * Club domestic league appearances and goals as of 21:18, 28 November 2025 (UTC) ‡ National team caps and goals as of 21:18, 28 November 2025 (UTC)

Karim Saïd Mohamed (born 2 April 2001) is a professional footballer who plays as a right-back for the Championnat National 1 club Borgo. Born in France, he plays for the Comoros national team.

== Club career ==
A youth product of Maringues, Mohamed moved to the academy of Clermont at the age of 10, and played for their reserves starting in 2018. In 2022, he had a stint with Moulins Yzeure for a season. On 18 July 2023, he transferred to Le Puy.

== International career ==
Born in France, Mohamed is of Comorian descent, and holds French and Comorian citizenship. He was called up to the Comoros U20s for the 2022 Maurice Revello Tournament. He was called up to the senior Comoros national team for the 2024 COSAFA Cup. He also made the team for the 2025 FIFA Arab Cup.
