= Marouane Louadni =

Moroccan footballer

Personal information
- Date of birth: 1 January 1995 (age 31)
- Place of birth: Kenitra, Morocco
- Height: 1.90 m (6 ft 3 in)
- Position: Centre-back

Team information
- Current team: AS FAR
- Number: 15

Senior career*
Years	Team	Apps	(Gls)
2016–2020	FUS de Rabat	77	(5)
2020–2023	Rapide Oued Zem	47	(3)
2023–2025	Umm-Salal SC	59	(5)
2025–	AS FAR	29	(0)

International career^{‡}
2025–	Morocco	9	(0)
- * Club domestic league appearances and goals as of 02:48, 10 November 2026 (UTC) ‡ National team caps and goals as of 00:24, 26 December 2025 (UTC)

Marouane Louadni (Arabic: مروان لودني; born 1 January 1995) is a Moroccan professional footballer who plays as a centre-back for AS FAR and the Morocco national team.

== Club career ==
Louadni was born in Kenitra, and began playing football with the amateur side Club Sebou de Kenitra. He was soon spotted by scouts and joined the youth academy of FUS de Rabat, where he made his professional debut in 2016.

During the 2017–18 season, he took part in the Arab Club Champions Cup and scored his first goal in a 1–1 draw against Al Ittihad FC.

== International career ==
Louadni was part of the Morocco national team that won the 2025 FIFA Arab Cup.

== Honours ==
Morocco

- African Nations Championship: 2024
- FIFA Arab Cup: 2025
