= Pett Bottom =

Pett Bottom may refer to:

- Pett Bottom (Brabourne), a place in the parish of Brabourne in the Borough of Ashford, Kent, UK; see List of United Kingdom locations: Peo-Pn § Pet
- Pett Bottom (Canterbury), a settlement near Lower Hardres in the City of Canterbury, Kent, UK
