= Karl Kaimba =

Footballer (born 1990)

Personal information
- Full name: Karl Kaimba Arantes
- Date of birth: 2 January 1990 (age 36)
- Place of birth: Central African Republic
- Position: Defender

Team information
- Current team: Montargis

Senior career*
Years	Team	Apps	(Gls)
–2008	Dijon B		
2008–2009	Reims B		
2009–2012	Deportivo Fabril		
2012–2013	KM Tornhout		
2013–2014	Montargis		
2014–2017	Vierzon		
2017–	Montargis	28+	(3+)

International career
2011	Central African Republic	1	(0)
- * Club domestic league appearances and goals

Karl Kaimba Arantes (born 2 January 1990) is a Central African Republic footballer who plays as a defender for Montargis.

== Career ==
In 2009, Kaimba signed for the reserves of Spanish La Liga side Deportivo La Coruña. In 2012, he signed for KM Tornhout in the Belgian third tier. In 2013, he signed for French club Montargis. In 2017, Kaimba returned to Montargis in the French fifth tier.
