= Milad Ahmadian =

Iranian footballer

Personal information
- Date of birth: 30 May 1993 (age 33)
- Place of birth: Tehran, Iran
- Height: 1.84 m (6 ft 0 in)
- Position: Goalkeeper

Team information
- Current team: Bandar Abbas
- Number: 29

Youth career
- 2010–2012: Steel Azin

Senior career*
Years	Team	Apps	(Gls)
2012–2013	Steel Azin	0	(0)
2013–2016	Paykan	4	(0)
2016–2018	Fajr Sepasi	25	(0)
2018–2019	Gol Reyhan	0	(0)
2019–2020	Havadar	1	(0)
2020	Shahid Ghandi		
2020–2021	Iranjavan		
2021–2022	Shahin Bandar Ameri		
2022–2024	Spad Alvand		
2024–	Bandar Abbas		
- * Club domestic league appearances and goals as of 7 January 2020

Milad Ahmadian (Persian: میلاد احمدیان; born 30 May 1993) is an Iranian football goalkeeper who plays for Bandar Abbas in the League 2.

== Club career ==
=== Paykan ===
Emamali started his career with Steel Azin from youth levels. He made his professional debut for Paykan on 8 March 2015 against Foolad as a starter.

== Club career statistics ==
As of 8 March 2015.

Club	Division	Season	League		Hazfi Cup		Asia		Total	
Club	Division	Season	Apps	Goals	Apps	Goals	Apps	Goals	Apps	Goals
Paykan	Division 1	2013–14	0	0	0	0	–	–	0	0
Paykan	Pro League	2014–15	1	0	1	0	–	–	2	0
Career Totals			1	0	1	0	0	0	2	0
