= Kamil Ulman =

Polish footballer

Personal information
- Full name: Kamil Ulman
- Date of birth: 21 April 1983 (age 43)
- Place of birth: Białystok, Poland
- Height: 1.85 m (6 ft 1 in)
- Position: Goalkeeper

Team information
- Current team: Krypnianka Krypno
- Number: 66

Senior career*
Years	Team	Apps	(Gls)
2001–2003	Jagiellonia Białystok		
2004	Ruch Wysokie Mazowieckie		
2004–2007	ŁKS Łomża	40	(0)
2008–2010	Vyzas		
2011	GKP Gorzów Wlkp.	8	(0)
2011	BKS Jagiellonia Białystok		
2012–2014	Orlęta Czyżew		
2015	Puszcza Hajnówka	10	(0)
2015	MKS Ełk	19	(0)
2016–2017	Biebrza Goniądz		
2017	Orzeł Tykocin		
2017–2018	Wissa Szczuczyn	14	(1)
2018	Orzeł Tykocin	6	(0)
2018–2020	Biebrza Goniądz	42	(2)
2020–2021	ŁKS 1926 Łomża	8	(1)
2021–2022	KS Wasilków	15	(0)
2022–2023	Promień Mońki	13	(1)
2023	MOSP Białystok	9	(0)
2023–	Krypnianka Krypno	50	(1)
- * Club domestic league appearances and goals as of 15:04, 22 June 2025 (UTC)

Kamil Ulman (born 21 April 1983) is a Polish footballer who plays as a goalkeeper for IV liga Podlasie club Krypnianka Krypno.

== Career ==
He was born in Białystok and began his professional career with Jagiellonia Białystok. He signed with Vyzas in January 2008.

In February 2011, he joined GKP Gorzów Wlkp.

== Personal life ==
Kamil Ulman is an active duty private in Polish Army.
