= Abdoulaye Naby Camara =

Guinean footballer

Personal information
- Date of birth: 1 January 1994 (age 32)
- Place of birth: Guinea
- Position: Defender

Team information
- Current team: CI Kamsar

Senior career*
| Years | Team | Apps | (Gls) |
| 2014–2017 | ASFAG | | |
| 2017– | CI Kamsar | | |

International career^{‡}
| 2017– | Guinea | 12 | (0) |
- * Club domestic league appearances and goals ‡ National team caps and goals as of 23:37, 16 September 2021 (UTC)

Abdoulaye Naby Camara (born 1 January 1994) is a Guinean professional footballer who plays as a defender for Guinée Championnat National club CI Kamsar and the Guinea national team.
