= Musab Al-Mamari =

Omani professional footballer (born 2000)

Personal information
- Birth name: Musab Hamed Mohammed Al Mor Al-Mamari
- Date of birth: January 22, 2000 (age 26)
- Place of birth: Rustaq, Oman
- Height: 1.69 m (5 ft 6 1/2 in)
- Position: Midfielder

Team information
- Current team: Al-Nasr SC
- Number: 71

Senior career*
Years	Team	Apps	(Gls)
2020–2023	Al-Rustaq		
2023–	Al-Nasr SC		

International career
2022–	Oman	12	(0)
- * Club domestic league appearances and goals

Musab Hamed Mohammed Al Mor Al-Mamari (Arabic: مصعب المعمري; born 22 January 2000) is an Omani professional footballer who plays as a midfielder for Al-Nasr SC and the Oman national team.

== Career ==
Al-Mamari began his senior career with his local club Al-Rustaq, and helped them achieve promotion to the Oman Professional League for the 2023–24 season. In 2023, he transferred to Al-Nasr SC.

== International ==
Al-Gheilani debuted with the senior Oman national team in a 1–0 friendly loss to Germany on 16 November 2022. He made the final squad for Oman for the 25th Arabian Gulf Cup in January 2023. He was called up to the national team for the 2023 AFC Asian Cup.
