= Jameel Al-Yahmadi =

Omani footballer (born 1996)

Personal information
- Full name: Jameel Saleem Jameel Al-Yahmadi
- Date of birth: 27 July 1996 (age 30)
- Place of birth: Bawshar, Oman
- Height: 1.73 m (5 ft 8 in)
- Positions: Midfielder; forward

Senior career*
Years	Team	Apps	(Gls)
2014–2018	Al-Shabab		(12)
2018–2020	Al-Wakrah	15	(5)
2020	Al-Shahania	5	(0)
2020–2023	Al-Markhiya	51	(10)
2023–2024	Al-Kharaitiyat	14	(3)
2024–2025	Al-Seeb	24	(5)

International career^{‡}
2018	Oman U23	2	(0)
2018–	Oman	63	(3)
Medal record
Men's football
Representing Oman
Gulf Cup
Runner-up	2024 Kuwait
- * Club domestic league appearances and goals as of 3 July 2025 ‡ National team caps and goals as of 23 May 2024

Jameel Saleem Jameel Al-Yahmadi (Arabic: جميل سليم جميل اليحمدي; born 27 July 1996) is an Omani professional footballer who plays for the Oman national team as a midfielder or forward.

== Club career ==
Al-Yahmadi began his career with Al-Shabab, before moving to Al-Wakra in the Qatari Second Division in 2018. He tore his ACL in 2019 which ruled him out of much of the 2019-20 season and led Al-Wakra to look for transfer options. He then moved to Al-Shahaniya, who hoped he could help them escape relegation.

In 2020, he signed with Al-Markhiya. In 2021, the team finished as runners-up in the Qatar FA Cup, a post-season tournament without the top clubs. Al-Markhiya won the Qatari Second Division in 2021/22 and were promoted to the Qatar Stars League. Al-Yahmadi renewed his contract with Al-Markhiya in July 2022, which then expired in summer 2023.

== International career ==
Al-Yahmadi made his debut for the Oman national football team in a friendly match on 24 March 2016 against Guam. He was included in Oman's squad for the 2017 CISM World Football Cup in Oman, the 2018 AFC U-23 Championship in China and the 2019 AFC Asian Cup in the United Arab Emirates.

Al-Yahmedi started all five matches during the 23rd Arabian Gulf Cup which Oman won after defeating UAE in the final. He has continued to play in tournaments and qualifying for Oman, including 2022 World Cup qualification, the 2021 Arab Cup, and the 25th Arabian Gulf Cup in which Oman finished second.

== Style of play ==
Al-Yahmadi is a left-footed player who often performs as an inverted right-winger, cutting inside from the flank. He has a low center of gravity which allows him to change directions quickly. Oman often uses Al-Yahmedi on the counterattack, especially due to his speed.

== Career statistics ==
=== International ===
Statistics accurate as of match played 27 March 2024

Oman national team
Year	Apps	Goals
2016	1	0
2017	10	1
2018	11	1
2019	6	0
2021	9	0
2022	8	0
2023	13	1
2024	5	0
Total	63	3

==== International goals ====
Scores and results list Oman's goal tally first.

No	Date	Venue	Opponent	Score	Result	Competition
1.	5 September 2017	Sultan Qaboos Sports Complex, Muscat, Oman	Maldives	4–0	5–0	2019 AFC Asian Cup qualification
2.	19 November 2018	Sultan Qaboos Sports Complex, Muscat, Oman	Bahrain	2–1	2–1	Friendly
	26 September 2021	Qatar University Stadium, Doha, Qatar	Nepal	7–1	7–2	Unofficial
3.	16 January 2023	Al-Minaa Olympic Stadium, Basra, Iraq	Bahrain	1–0	1–0	25th Arabian Gulf Cup
4.	8 September 2025	Hisor Central Stadium, Hisor, Tajikistan	India	1–0	1–1 (2–3 p)	2025 CAFA Nations Cup
