= Jawad El Hajri =

Footballer (born 1979)

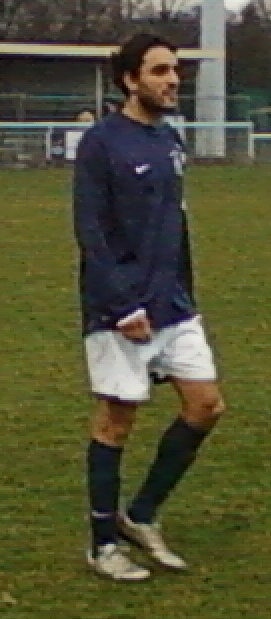
- El-Hajri in 2011

Personal information
- Date of birth: 1 November 1979 (age 46)
- Place of birth: Bergerac, France
- Height: 1.79 m (5 ft 10 in)
- Position: Forward

Senior career*
Years	Team	Apps	(Gls)
1999–2001	Pacy-sur-Eure	66	(24)
2001–2002	Alès	12	(1)
2002–2003	Guingamp B	28	(12)
2003–2004	Cherbourg	20	(7)
2004–2006	Boulogne	55	(44)
2006–2007	Brest	21	(3)
2007–2008	Baniyas		
2008–2009	Pacy-sur-Eure	16	(3)
2009	Dibba Al Fujairah		
2009–2010	Dubai		
2010	Moulins	19	(7)
2010–2011	Paris	24	(6)
2011–2014	Moulins	70	(20)
2014–2016	Yzeure	24	(4)

International career
2006	Morocco	1	(0)
- * Club domestic league appearances and goals

Jawad El Hajri (born 1 November 1979), also known as Jaouad El Hajri, is a former professional footballer who played as a forward. Born in France, he won one cap for the Morocco national team in a friendly against Burkina Faso in 2006.
