= Thani Al-Rushaidi =

Omani footballer

Personal information
- Full name: Thani Gharib Thani Khamis Al-Rushaidi
- Date of birth: 16 March 1995 (age 31)
- Place of birth: Saham, Oman
- Height: 1.85 m (6 ft 1 in)
- Position: Centre-back

Team information
- Current team: Al-Nahda Club
- Number: 4

Senior career*
Years	Team	Apps	(Gls)
2017–2018	Saham Club		
2018–2021	Al-Rustaq		
2021–2024	Dhofar	61	(5)
2024–	Al-Nahda Club	38	(6)

International career^{‡}
2024–	Oman	25	(0)
- * Club domestic league appearances and goals as of 16:18, 5 June 2026 (UTC) ‡ National team caps and goals as of 16:18, 5 June 2026 (UTC)

Thani Gharib Thani Khamis Al-Rushaidi (ثاني الرشيدي; born 16 March 1995) is an Omani footballer who plays as a defender for Al-Nahda Club in the Oman Professional League.

== Club career ==
Al-Rushaidi began his senior career at Saham Club, where he spent the 2017–18 season before joining Al-Rustaq in 2018. He subsequently moved to Dhofar, appearing in 40 league matches across two seasons and contributing one goal, before signing for Al-Nahda Club ahead of the 2024–25 season, where he scored 4 goals in 18 appearances as the club finished runners-up in the Oman Professional League.

== International career ==
Al-Rushaidi made his senior international debut for the Oman national football team in 2024 and has since become a regular starter in the Oman defence. He has earned 20 FIFA caps, representing Oman in the 26th Arabian Gulf Cup, the 2025 CAFA Nations Cup, and the 2025 Arab Cup.

== Honours ==
Dhofar Club

- Sultan Qaboos Cup: 2023–24
