= Fodé Moussa Sylla =

Guinean footballer

Personal information
- Full name: Fodé Moussa Sylla
- Date of birth: 31 July 1988 (age 38)
- Place of birth: Conakry, Guinea
- Height: 1.73 m (5 ft 8 in)
- Position: Central midfielder

Team information
- Current team: Horoya AC
- Number: 15

Youth career
- SC Matoto
- 2002–2003: Horoya AC

Senior career*
Years	Team	Apps	(Gls)
2009–2010	Horoya AC		
2010–2012	Liberty Professionals F.C.		
2012–	Horoya AC		

International career
2011	Guinea	2	(0)
- * Club domestic league appearances and goals

Fodé Moussa Sylla (born 31 July 1988 in Conakry) is a Guinean football player, who currently plays for Horoya AC.

== Career ==
Sylla started his career with Sporting Club de Matoto and signed than 2002 with Horoya AC. He played until spring 2009 for Horoya before signed in October 2009 with Ghana Premier League club Liberty Professionals F.C. Sylla played with fellow man Naby Capi Soumah by Liberty Pro, who joined besides in the middle of 2009 from Guinean side Horoya AC to Liberty. He left in the November 2010 his Ghanaian club Liberty Professionals F.C. and returned to Horoya AC.

=== International ===
He played 2011 two games for the Guinea national football team, by a tournament in Mozambique.
