= Martin Pett =

German footballer

Personal information
- Date of birth: October 12, 1986 (age 40)
- Place of birth: Rostock, East Germany
- Height: 1.78 m (5 ft 10 in)
- Position: Midfielder

Team information
- Current team: Hansa Rostock
- Number: 16

Youth career
- SV Warnemünde
- –2005: Hansa Rostock

Senior career*
Years	Team	Apps	(Gls)
2005–2010	Hansa Rostock II	136	(7)
2010–2011	Goslarer SC	30	(6)
2011–2015	Hansa Rostock II	84	(10)
2013–2015	Hansa Rostock	6	(0)
- * Club domestic league appearances and goals as of 22:09, 12 February 2018 (UTC)

Martin Pett (born October 12, 1986) is a German footballer who plays as a midfielder.

== Career ==
Pett began his career with Hansa Rostock, and spent five years playing for the reserve team before joining Goslarer SC in 2010. A year later he returned to Hansa Rostock II, and he was promoted to the first-team in September 2013, making his debut as a substitute for Denis Weidlich in a 1–1 draw with Chemnitzer FC in the 3. Liga.
