= Mateusz Łuczak =

Polish footballer

Personal information
- Full name: Mateusz Łuczak
- Date of birth: 13 March 1990 (age 36)
- Place of birth: Gdańsk, Poland
- Height: 1.83 m (6 ft 0 in)
- Position: Forward

Team information
- Current team: Okęcie Warsaw
- Number: 19

Youth career
- Polonia Gdańsk
- Gedania Gdańsk
- Lechia Gdańsk

Senior career*
Years	Team	Apps	(Gls)
2008–2011	Lechia Gdańsk	3	(0)
2010–2011	Lechia Gdańsk II	20	(5)
2011	→ Bałtyk Gdynia (loan)	15	(1)
2012	Korona Kielce	5	(0)
2012	Cartusia Kartuzy	10	(1)
2013	Gryf Wejherowo	31	(2)
2014–2015	Kaszubia Kościerzyna	27	(17)
2015–2016	KS Chwaszczyno	24	(5)
2016–2017	GKS Przodkowo	23	(4)
2017–2019	Radunia Stężyca	61	(24)
2019–2021	GKS Przodkowo	26	(13)
2021	Kaszubia Kościerzyna	11	(0)
2021–2022	Weszło Warsaw	15	(0)
2025–	Okęcie Warsaw	1	(0)
- * Club domestic league appearances and goals as of 10:00, 20 June 2025 (UTC)

Mateusz Łuczak (born 13 March 1990) is a Polish footballer who plays as a forward for regional league club Okęcie Warsaw.

== Career ==
In 2013, he announced his retirement from professional football, but later continued playing for amateur clubs. In 2021, he joined the regional league's expansion team Weszło Warsaw.

== Honours ==
Radunia Stężyca

- IV liga Pomerania: 2017–18

GKS Przodkowo

- IV liga Pomerania: 2019–20

Weszło Warsaw

- Regional league Warsaw I: 2021–22
