= 2021 FIFA Arab Cup Group A =

Second group (group stage) of 2021 FIFA Arab Cup

Group A of the 2021 FIFA Arab Cup took place from 30 November 2021 to 6 December 2021. The group consisted of hosts Qatar, Iraq, Oman and Bahrain.

The top two teams, Qatar and Oman, advanced to the quarter-finals.

== Teams ==
Draw position	Team	Finals appearance	Last appearance	Previous best performance	FIFA Rankings	
Draw position	Team	Finals appearance	Last appearance	Previous best performance	April 2021 (Note: The rankings of April 2021 were used for seeding for the final draw.)	November 2021
A1	Qatar	3rd	1998 (runners-up)	Runners-up (1998)	58	51
A2	Iraq	6th	2012 (third place)	Winners (1964, 1966, 1985, 1988)	68	75
A3	Oman	2nd	1966 (group stage)	Group stage (1966)	80	78
A4	Bahrain	6th	2012 (group stage)	Runners-up (1985, 2002)	99	90

== Standings ==
Pos	Team	Pld	W	D	L	GF	GA	GD	Pts	Qualification
1	Qatar (H)	3	3	0	0	6	1	+5	9	Advance to knockout stage
2	Oman	3	1	1	1	5	3	+2	4	Advance to knockout stage
3	Iraq	3	0	2	1	1	4	−3	2	
4	Bahrain	3	0	1	2	0	4	−4	1	

Source: FIFA
(H) Hosts

In the quarter-finals:

- Qatar advanced to play against United Arab Emirates (runners-up of Group B).
- Oman advanced to play against Tunisia (winners of Group B).

== Matches ==
=== Iraq vs Oman ===
30 November 2021
16:00

Iraq	1–1	Oman
Abdulkareem 90+8' (pen.)	Report	Al-Yahyaei 78' (pen.)

Al Janoub Stadium, Al Wakrah
Attendance: 1,576
Referee: Said Martínez (Honduras)

Iraq	Oman

GK	1	Fahad Talib
RB	7	Sherko Karim
CB	4	Mustafa Nadhim
CB	2	Munaf Younis		(substituted off) 69'
LB	5	Hassan Raed
CM	14	Amjad Attwan (c)
CM	8	Yaser Kasim	(yellow card) 50' (yellow-red card) 68'
RW	19	Mohammed Qasim		(substituted off) 79'
AM	16	Ahmed Farhan		(substituted off) 69'
LW	13	Bashar Resan		(substituted off) 69'
CF	10	Alaa Abbas		(substituted off) 79'
Substitutes:
MF	6	Muntadher Mohammed		(substituted on) 69'
MF	17	Ahmad Fadhel		(substituted on) 69'
DF	23	Maitham Jabbar		(substituted on) 69'
FW	9	Aymen Hussein		(substituted on) 79'
FW	11	Hasan Abdulkareem		(substituted on) 79'
Manager:
(Montenegro) Željko Petrović

GK	22	Ahmed Al-Rawahi
RB	14	Amjad Al-Harthi	(yellow card) 90+6'
CB	5	Juma Al-Habsi
CB	6	Ahmed Al Khamisi	(yellow card) 13'
LB	2	Ahmed Al-Kaabi
CM	23	Harib Al-Saadi
CM	10	Mohsin Al-Khaldi (c)		(substituted off) 61'
RW	15	Jameel Al-Yahmadi		(substituted off) 61'
AM	20	Salaah Al-Yahyaei
LW	19	Rabia Al-Alawi		(substituted off) 61'
CF	11	Muhsen Al-Ghassani		(substituted off) 81'
Substitutes:
MF	4	Arshad Al-Alawi		(substituted on) 61'
MF	12	Abdullah Fawaz		(substituted on) 61'
FW	9	Issam Al Sabhi		(substituted on) 61'
FW	7	Khalid Al-Hajri		(substituted on) 81'
Manager:
(Croatia) Branko Ivanković

Assistant referees:
Walter López (Honduras)
Christian Ramirez (Honduras)
Fourth official:
Wilton Sampaio (Brazil)
Video assistant referee:
Jair Marrufo (United States)
Assistant video assistant referees:
Juan Soto (Venezuela)
Ezequiel Brailovsky (Argentina)
Rafael Traci (Brazil)

=== Qatar vs Bahrain ===
30 November 2021
19:30

Qatar	1–0	Bahrain
Hatem 69'	Report

Al Bayt Stadium, Al Khor
Attendance: 47,813
Referee: Szymon Marciniak (Poland)

Qatar	Bahrain

GK	1	Saad Al Sheeb
CB	15	Bassam Al-Rawi
CB	16	Boualem Khoukhi
CB	5	Tarek Salman		(substituted off) 46'
RWB	2	Ró-Ró	(yellow card) 44'	(substituted off) 82'
LWB	14	Homam Ahmed	(yellow card) 37'
CM	4	Mohammed Waad (c)
CM	23	Assim Madibo	(yellow card) 53'	(substituted off) 82'
CM	6	Abdulaziz Hatem
SS	11	Akram Afif		(substituted off) 89'
CF	19	Almoez Ali		(substituted off) 90+3'
Substitutes:
FW	10	Hassan Al-Haydos		(substituted on) 46'
DF	13	Musab Kheder		(substituted on) 82'
FW	9	Mohammed Muntari		(substituted on) 82'
DF	3	Abdelkarim Hassan		(substituted on) 89'
DF	17	Ismaeel Mohammad		(substituted on) 90+3'
Manager:
(Spain) Félix Sánchez

GK	21	Sayed Mohammed Jaffer (c)
RB	16	Sayed Redha Isa	(yellow card) 41'
CB	5	Ahmed Bughammar
CB	3	Waleed Al Hayam	(yellow card) 29'
LB	4	Sayed Dhiya Saeed	(yellow card) 57'
CM	14	Mohammed Al-Hardan		(substituted off) 78'
CM	19	Kamil Al Aswad
RW	7	Ali Madan		(substituted off) 88'
AM	15	Jasim Al-Shaikh		(substituted off) 88'
LW	20	Mahdi Al-Humaidan		(substituted off) 67'
CF	13	Mohamed Al-Romaihi		(substituted off) 78'
Substitutes:
FW	8	Mohamed Marhoon		(substituted on) 67'
MF	10	Abdulwahab Al-Malood		(substituted on) 78'
FW	11	Ismail Abdullatif		(substituted on) 78'
MF	17	Abbas Al-Asfoor		(substituted on) 88'
FW	9	Mahdi Abduljabbar		(substituted on) 88'
Manager:
(Portugal) Hélio Sousa

Assistant referees:
Paweł Sokolnicki (Poland)
Tomasz Listkiewicz (Poland)
Fourth official:
Andrés Matonte (Uruguay)
Video assistant referee:
Tomasz Kwiatkowski (Poland)
Assistant video assistant referees:
Guillermo Cuadra Fernández (Spain)
Bruno Pires (Brazil)
Leodán González (Uruguay)

=== Bahrain vs Iraq ===
3 December 2021
13:00

Bahrain	0–0	Iraq
	Report

Al Thumama Stadium, Doha
Attendance: 2,576
Referee: Janny Sikazwe (Zambia)

Bahrain	Iraq

GK	21	Sayed Mohammed Jaffer (c)
RB	6	Abbas Ayyad
CB	5	Ahmed Bughammar		(substituted off) 9'
CB	3	Waleed Al Hayam
LB	23	Rashed Al-Hooti
CM	17	Abbas Al-Asfoor
CM	15	Jasim Al-Shaikh
CM	10	Abdulwahab Al-Malood		(substituted off) 60'
RF	20	Mahdi Al-Humaidan	(yellow card) 57'	(substituted off) 78'
CF	11	Ismail Abdullatif		(substituted off) 60'
LF	8	Mohamed Marhoon		(substituted off) 78'
Substitutes:
DF	2	Sayed Baqer	(yellow card) 87'	(substituted on) 9'
MF	19	Kamil Al Aswad		(substituted on) 60'
FW	9	Mahdi Abduljabbar		(substituted on) 60'
MF	7	Ali Madan	(yellow card) 86'	(substituted on) 78'
FW	13	Mohamed Al-Romaihi		(substituted on) 78'
Manager:
(Portugal) Hélio Sousa

GK	1	Fahad Talib
RB	7	Sherko Karim		(substituted off) 66'
CB	22	Rebin Sulaka
CB	2	Munaf Younis
LB	5	Hassan Raed
CM	14	Amjad Attwan (c)		(substituted off) 80'
RW	19	Mohammed Qasim
AM	18	Sajjad Jassim	(yellow card) 16'	(substituted off) 46'
LW	13	Bashar Resan		(substituted off) 70'
SS	16	Ahmed Farhan
CF	10	Alaa Abbas		(substituted off) 70'
Substitutes:
MF	17	Ahmad Fadhel	(yellow card) 90+2'	(substituted on) 46'
DF	3	Frans Putros		(substituted on) 66'
FW	9	Aymen Hussein		(substituted on) 70'
FW	11	Hasan Abdulkareem		(substituted on) 70'
DF	4	Mustafa Nadhim		(substituted on) 80'
Manager:
(Montenegro) Željko Petrović

Assistant referees:
Zakhele Siwela (South Africa)
Jerson Dos Santos (Angola)
Fourth official:
Daniel Siebert (Germany)
Video assistant referee:
Rédouane Jiyed (Morocco)
Assistant video assistant referees:
Fernando Guerrero (Mexico)
Elvis Noupue (Cameroon)
Christian Dingert (Germany)

=== Oman vs Qatar ===
3 December 2021
16:00

Oman	1–2	Qatar
Al-Hajri 74'	Report	Afif 32' (pen.); Durbin 90+7' (o.g.)

Education City Stadium, Al Rayyan
Attendance: 23,254
Referee: Wilton Sampaio (Brazil)

Oman	Qatar

GK	1	Ibrahim Al-Mukhaini
RB	14	Amjad Al-Harthi
CB	6	Ahmed Al Khamisi
CB	5	Juma Al-Habsi
LB	2	Ahmed Al-Kaabi
CM	12	Abdullah Fawaz	(substituted off) 87'
CM	23	Harib Al-Saadi (c)
CM	4	Arshad Al-Alawi
AM	20	Salaah Al-Yahyaei	(substituted off) 87'
CF	9	Issam Al Sabhi	(substituted off) 57'
CF	17	Mohammed Al-Ghafri	(substituted off) 46'
Substitutes:
FW	7	Khalid Al-Hajri	(substituted on) 46'
FW	11	Muhsen Al-Ghassani	(substituted on) 57'
DF	3	Fahmi Durbin	(substituted on) 87'
FW	15	Jameel Al-Yahmadi	(substituted on) 87'
Manager:
(Croatia) Branko Ivanković

GK	1	Saad Al Sheeb
RB	2	Ró-Ró	(substituted off) 38'
CB	15	Bassam Al-Rawi
CB	16	Boualem Khoukhi
LB	3	Abdelkarim Hassan
CM	12	Karim Boudiaf	(substituted off) 46'
CM	6	Abdulaziz Hatem	(substituted off) 90'
CM	14	Homam Ahmed
RF	10	Hassan Al-Haydos (c)	(substituted off) 78'
CF	19	Almoez Ali
LF	11	Akram Afif
Substitutes:
DF	13	Musab Kheder	(substituted on) 38'
MF	23	Assim Madibo	(substituted on) 46'
MF	4	Mohammed Waad	(substituted on) 78'
FW	9	Mohammed Muntari	(substituted on) 90'
Manager:
(Spain) Félix Sánchez

Assistant referees:
Danilo Manis (Brazil)
Bruno Pires (Brazil)
Fourth official:
Bakary Gassama (Gambia)
Video assistant referee:
Rafael Traci (Brazil)
Assistant video assistant referees:
Guillermo Cuadra Fernández (Spain)
Rafael Foltyn (Germany)
Shaun Evans (Australia)

=== Oman vs Bahrain ===
6 December 2021
22:00

Oman	3–0	Bahrain
R. Al-Alawi 41'; A. Al-Alawi 50'; Al-Hajri 59'	Report

Ahmad bin Ali Stadium, Al Rayyan
Attendance: 2,477
Referee: Ryuji Sato (Japan)

Oman	Bahrain

GK	1	Ibrahim Al-Mukhaini
RB	14	Amjad Al-Harthi	(yellow card) 34'	(substituted off) 78'
CB	6	Ahmed Al Khamisi
CB	5	Juma Al-Habsi
LB	2	Ahmed Al-Kaabi
CM	12	Abdullah Fawaz		(substituted off) 78'
CM	23	Harib Al-Saadi (c)
CM	4	Arshad Al-Alawi
RF	20	Salaah Al-Yahyaei		(substituted off) 89'
CF	7	Khalid Al-Hajri		(substituted off) 73'
LF	19	Rabia Al-Alawi		(substituted off) 73'
Substitutes:
MF	8	Mataz Saleh		(substituted on) 73'
FW	9	Issam Al Sabhi		(substituted on) 73'
DF	3	Fahmi Durbin		(substituted on) 78'
FW	15	Jameel Al-Yahmadi		(substituted on) 78'
MF	10	Mohsin Al-Khaldi		(substituted on) 89'
Manager:
(Croatia) Branko Ivanković

GK	21	Sayed Mohammed Jaffer (c)
RB	16	Sayed Redha Isa
CB	2	Sayed Baqer
CB	3	Waleed Al Hayam
LB	4	Sayed Dhiya Saeed
CM	19	Kamil Al Aswad	(substituted off) 82'
CM	17	Abbas Al-Asfoor	(substituted off) 46'
CM	14	Mohammed Al-Hardan	(substituted off) 55'
RF	7	Ali Madan	(substituted off) 55'
CF	13	Mohamed Al-Romaihi	(substituted off) 75'
LF	8	Mohamed Marhoon
Substitutes:
MF	15	Jasim Al-Shaikh	(substituted on) 46'
MF	12	Mohamed Abdulwahab	(substituted on) 55'
FW	20	Mahdi Al-Humaidan	(substituted on) 55'
FW	9	Mahdi Abduljabbar	(substituted on) 75'
MF	10	Abdulwahab Al-Malood	(substituted on) 82'
Manager:
(Portugal) Hélio Sousa

Assistant referees:
Jun Mihara (Japan)
Osamu Nomura (Japan)
Fourth official:
Jair Marrufo (United States)
Video assistant referee:
Hiroyuki Kimura (Japan)
Assistant video assistant referees:
Kevin Blom (Netherlands)
Adonai Escobedo (Mexico)
Fernando Guerrero (Mexico)

=== Qatar vs Iraq ===
6 December 2021
22:00

Qatar	3–0	Iraq
Ali 82'; Afif 84'; Al-Haydos 90+4'	Report

Al Bayt Stadium, Al Khor
Attendance: 23,008
Referee: Bakary Gassama (Gambia)

Qatar	Iraq

GK	21	Yousef Hassan
RB	17	Ismaeel Mohammad
CB	15	Bassam Al-Rawi	(substituted off) 60'
CB	5	Tarek Salman
LB	13	Musab Kheder
CM	4	Mohammed Waad
CM	6	Abdulaziz Hatem (c)
RW	8	Ali Assadalla	(substituted off) 69'
LW	20	Abdullah Al-Ahrak	(substituted off) 83'
CF	9	Mohammed Muntari	(substituted off) 69'
CF	7	Ahmed Alaaeldin	(substituted off) 60'
Substitutes:
DF	16	Boualem Khoukhi	(substituted on) 60'
FW	18	Khalid Muneer	(substituted on) 60'
FW	10	Hassan Al-Haydos	(substituted on) 69'
FW	19	Almoez Ali	(substituted on) 69'
FW	11	Akram Afif	(substituted on) 83'
Manager:
(Spain) Félix Sánchez

GK	1	Fahad Talib (c)
CB	22	Rebin Sulaka
CB	4	Mustafa Nadhim	(substituted off) 75'
CB	2	Munaf Younis
RWB	7	Sherko Karim
LWB	5	Hassan Raed
CM	19	Mohammed Qasim
CM	8	Yaser Kasim
CM	13	Bashar Resan	(substituted off) 51'
SS	11	Hasan Abdulkareem	(substituted off) 60'
CF	10	Alaa Abbas	(substituted off) 75'
Substitutes:
FW	21	Ali Yousif	(substituted on) 51'
MF	6	Muntadher Mohammed	(substituted on) 60'
MF	17	Ahmad Fadhel	(substituted on) 75'
FW	9	Aymen Hussein	(substituted on) 75'
Manager:
(Montenegro) Željko Petrović

Assistant referees:
Djibril Camara (Senegal)
Elvis Noupue (Cameroon)
Fourth official:
Said Martínez (Honduras)
Video assistant referee:
Shaun Evans (Australia)
Assistant video assistant referees:
Rédouane Jiyed (Morocco)
Tomasz Listkiewicz (Poland)
Juan Soto (Venezuela)
