= 25th Arabian Gulf Cup Group A =

Football tournament group stage

The Group A of the 25th Arabian Gulf Cup was one of the two groups of competing nations in the 25th Arabian Gulf Cup. It consisted of hosts Iraq, Yemen, Saudi Arabia and Oman. The matches took place from 6 to 12 January 2023. The top two teams, Iraq and Oman, advanced to the semi-finals.

== Teams ==
Team	Appearance	Previous best performance	FIFA Rankings (October 2022)			
Team	Appearance	Previous best performance	Iraq (hosts)	16th	Winners (1979, 1984, 1988)	68
Yemen	10th	Group stage (2003–04, 2004, 2007, 2009, 2010, 2013, 2014, 2017–18, 2019)	155			
Saudi Arabia	24th	Winners (1994, 2002, 2003–04)	51			
Oman	23rd	Winners (2009, 2017–18)	75			

== Standings ==
Pos	Team	Pld	W	D	L	GF	GA	GD	Pts	Qualification
1	Iraq (H)	3	2	1	0	7	0	+7	7	Advance to knockout stage
2	Oman	3	2	1	0	5	3	+2	7	Advance to knockout stage
3	Saudi Arabia	3	1	0	2	3	4	−1	3	
4	Yemen	3	0	0	3	2	10	−8	0	

Source: AGCFF
Rules for classification: Group stage tiebreakers
(H) Hosts

== Matches ==
=== Iraq vs Oman ===
6 January 2023
19:00 UTC+3

Iraq	0–0	Oman
	Report

Basra International Stadium, Basra
Referee: István Kovács (Romania)

Iraq	Oman

GK	12	Jalal Hassan (c)
RB	17	Hussein Ammar		(substituted off) 46'
CB	5	Ali Faez
CB	4	Mustafa Nadhim
LB	15	Dhurgham Ismail
CM	14	Amjad Attwan	(yellow card) 39'	(substituted off) 74'
CM	16	Amir Al-Ammari		(substituted off) 89'
RW	7	Hussein Ali		(substituted off) 61'
AM	8	Ibrahim Bayesh	(yellow card) 38'
LW	20	Hussein Jabbar		(substituted off) 62'
CF	18	Aymen Hussein
Substitutions:
DF	6	Alai Ghasem		(substituted on) 46'
MF	11	Sherko Karim		(substituted on) 61'
MF	19	Mohammed Ali Abboud		(substituted on) 62'
MF	13	Rewan Amin		(substituted on) 74'
MF	23	Moammel Abdul-Ridha		(substituted on) 89'
Manager:
(Spain) Jesús Casas

GK	1	Ibrahim Al-Mukhaini
RB	11	Amjad Al-Harthi	(yellow card) 72'
CB	5	Juma Al-Habsi	(yellow card) 87'
CB	6	Ahmed Al-Khamisi
LB	14	Ahmed Al-Kaabi
CM	10	Jameel Al-Yahmadi		(substituted off) 85'
CM	23	Harib Al-Saadi (c)	(yellow card) 40'
CM	8	Zahir Al-Aghbari		(substituted off) 59'
AM	4	Arshad Al-Alawi		(substituted off) 85'
CF	7	Issam Al-Sabhi
CF	17	Rabia Al-Alawi		(substituted off) 90+3'
Substitutions:
MF	15	Musab Al-Mamari		(substituted on) 59'
DF	16	Khalid Al-Braiki		(substituted on) 85'
MF	21	Mataz Saleh		(substituted on) 85'
DF	2	Mohammed Al-Musalami		(substituted on) 90+3'
Manager:
(Croatia) Branko Ivanković

Man of the Match:
Dhurgham Ismail (Iraq)

Assistant referees:
Ovidiu-Mihai Artene (Romania)
Vasile Marinescu (Romania)
Fourth official:
Adnan Al-Naqbi (United Arab Emirates)
Video assistant referee:
Rédouane Jiyed (Morocco)
Assistant video assistant referee:
Jérémie Pignard (France)

=== Yemen vs Saudi Arabia ===
6 January 2023
21:45 UTC+3

Yemen	0–2	Saudi Arabia
	Report	Al-Nabit 18'; Al-Juwayr 34' (pen.)

Basra International Stadium, Basra
Referee: Salman Falahi (Qatar)

Yemen	Saudi Arabia

GK	22	Salem Al-Harsh
RB	17	Emad Al-Godaimah
CB	3	Harwan Alzubaidi	(yellow card) 62'
CB	4	Mudir Al-Radaei (c)
LB	16	Ahmed Al-Wajeeh
DM	15	Mohammed Al-Tiri
RM	11	Abdulwasea Al-Matari		(substituted off) 85'
CM	8	Anes Al-Maari		(substituted off) 80'
CM	10	Nasser Al-Gahwashi		(substituted off) 63'
LM	9	Omar Al-Dahi		(substituted off) 85'
CF	12	Ahmed Maher		(substituted off) 63'
Substitutions:
CF	7	Ahmed Al-Sarori		(substituted on) 63'
MF	20	Hamza Hanash		(substituted on) 63'
DF	2	Hamza Al-Rimi		(substituted on) 80'
FW	19	Ali Alomari		(substituted on) 85'
MF	18	Mohammed Al-Dahi		(substituted on) 85'
Manager:
(Czech Republic) Miroslav Soukup

GK	1	Nawaf Al-Aqidi
RB	2	Madallah Al-Olayan	(yellow card) 78'	(substituted off) 90'
CB	3	Ahmed Bamsaud
CB	5	Qassem Lajami
LB	4	Ziyad Al-Sahafi
CM	14	Awad Al-Nashri		(substituted off) 78'
CM	6	Riyadh Sharahili (c)
CM	23	Musab Al-Juwayr	(yellow card) 29'	(substituted off) 90'
RW	7	Sumayhan Al-Nabit
CF	9	Raed Al-Ghamdi		(substituted off) 84'
LW	10	Turki Al-Ammar		(substituted off) 77'
Substitutions:
MF	8	Faisal Al-Ghamdi		(substituted on) 90'
MF	12	Mohammed Aboulshamat		(substituted on) 84'
FW	16	Mohammed Maran		(substituted on) 90'
MF	17	Naif Masoud		(substituted on) 78'
MF	18	Saad Al-Nasser		(substituted on) 77'
Manager:
Saad Al-Shehri

Man of the Match:
Sumayhan Al-Nabit (Saudi Arabia)

Assistant referees:
Khaled Ayed (Qatar)
Zahi Al-Shammari (Qatar)
Fourth official:
Abdullah Jamali (Kuwait)
Video assistant referee:
Abdullah Al-Marri (Qatar)
Assistant video assistant referee:
Ahmed Darwish (United Arab Emirates)

=== Oman vs Yemen ===
9 January 2023
16:15 UTC+3

Oman	3–2	Yemen
Fadhl 2' (o.g.); A. Al-Alawi 37'; Al-Sabhi 47'	Report	Al-Matari 12' (pen.); O. Al-Dahi 30'

Basra International Stadium, Basra
Referee: Abdullah Jamali (Kuwait)

Oman	Yemen

GK	1	Ibrahim Al-Mukhaini
RB	19	Mahmood Al-Mushaifri	(substituted off) 57'
CB	4	Arshad Al-Alawi	(substituted off) 75'
CB	2	Mohammed Al-Musalami (c)
LB	14	Ahmed Al-Kaabi
CM	23	Harib Al-Saadi
CM	5	Juma Al-Habsi
CM	20	Salaah Al-Yahyaei	(substituted off) 75'
AM	10	Jameel Al-Yahmadi	(substituted off) 89'
CF	17	Rabia Al-Alawi
CF	7	Issam Al-Sabhi	(substituted off) 75'
Substitutions:
DF	6	Ahmed Al-Khamisi	(substituted on) 57'
FW	9	Omar Al-Malki	(substituted on) 75'
MF	15	Musab Al-Mamari	(substituted on) 75'
FW	8	Zahir Al-Aghbari	(substituted on) 75'
DF	16	Khalid Al-Braiki	(substituted on) 89'
Manager:
(Croatia) Branko Ivanković

GK	23	Ali Fadhl		(substituted off) 46'
RB	17	Emad Al-Godaimah	(yellow card) 50'
CB	3	Harwan Alzubaidi
CB	4	Mudir Al-Radaei (c)	(yellow card) 44'
LB	16	Ahmed Al-Wajeeh		(substituted off) 62'
DM	15	Mohammed Al-Tiri	(yellow card) 45+3'
RM	11	Abdulwasea Al-Matari
CM	8	Anes Al-Maari		(substituted off) 77'
CM	20	Hamza Hanash		(substituted off) 62'
LM	9	Omar Al-Dahi
CF	12	Ahmed Maher		(substituted off) 73'
Substitutions:
GK	1	Mohamed Aman		(substituted on) 46'
DF	2	Hamza Al-Rimi		(substituted on) 62'
DF	21	Jarallah Al-Zaghari		(substituted on) 62'
MF	18	Mohammed Al-Dahi		(substituted on) 73'
FW	7	Ahmed Al-Sarori		(substituted on) 77'
Manager:
(Czech Republic) Miroslav Soukup

Man of the Match:
Salaah Al-Yahyaei (Oman)

Assistant referees:
Abdulhadi Al-Enezi (Kuwait)
Sayed Ali Mahmoud (Kuwait)
Fourth official:
Ilgiz Tantashev (Uzbekistan)
Video assistant referee:
Rédouane Jiyed (Morocco)
Assistant video assistant referee:
Hashem Al-Ibrahim (Kuwait)

=== Saudi Arabia vs Iraq ===
9 January 2023
19:15 UTC+3

Saudi Arabia	0–2	Iraq
	Report	Bayesh 30'; Rostam 86'

Basra International Stadium, Basra
Referee: Adel Al-Naqbi (United Arab Emirates)

Saudi Arabia	Iraq

GK	1	Nawaf Al-Aqidi
RB	2	Madallah Al-Olayan
CB	4	Ziyad Al-Sahafi
CB	5	Qassem Lajami
LB	3	Ahmed Bamsaud	(substituted off) 78'
CM	14	Awad Al-Nashri	(substituted off) 61'
CM	6	Riyadh Sharahili (c)
RW	23	Musab Al-Juwayr	(substituted off) 61'
AM	18	Saad Al-Nasser	(substituted off) 61'
LW	7	Sumayhan Al-Nabit
CF	9	Raed Al-Ghamdi	(substituted off) 61'
Substitutions:
FW	16	Mohammed Maran	(substituted on) 61'
MF	10	Turki Al-Ammar	(substituted on) 61'
MF	17	Naif Masoud	(substituted on) 61'
MF	11	Ahmed Al-Ghamdi	(substituted on) 61'
MF	15	Hussain Al-Eisa	(substituted on) 78'
Manager:
Saad Al-Shehri

GK	22	Ahmed Basil
RB	6	Alai Ghasem
CB	4	Mustafa Nadhim
CB	5	Ali Faez
LB	15	Dhurgham Ismail (c)	(yellow card) 37'
CM	19	Mohammed Ali Abboud		(substituted off) 90+1'
CM	16	Amir Al-Ammari		(substituted off) 90+1'
RW	10	Hasan Abdulkareem		(substituted off) 61'
AM	14	Amjad Attwan		(substituted off) 78'
LW	8	Ibrahim Bayesh
CF	18	Aymen Hussein		(substituted off) 61'
Substitutions:
FW	21	Aso Rostam		(substituted on) 61'
MF	11	Sherko Karim		(substituted on) 61'
MF	23	Moammel Abdul-Ridha		(substituted on) 78'
DF	2	Munaf Younis		(substituted on) 90+1'
DF	3	Zaid Tahseen		(substituted on) 90+1'
Manager:
(Spain) Jesús Casas

Man of the Match:
Ibrahim Bayesh (Iraq)

Assistant referees:
Ali Al Nuami (United Arab Emirates)
Sabet Suroor (United Arab Emirates)
Fourth official:
Ma Ning (China)
Video assistant referee:
Abdullah Al-Marri (Qatar)
Assistant video assistant referee:
Ahmed Eissa (United Arab Emirates)

=== Iraq vs Yemen ===
12 January 2023
18:00 UTC+3

Iraq	5–0	Yemen
Nadhim 40'; Attwan 64'; Hussein 74' (pen.), 75'; Ali 88'	Report

Basra International Stadium, Basra
Referee: Ilgiz Tantashev (Uzbekistan)

Iraq	Yemen

GK	12	Jalal Hassan (c)
RB	17	Hussein Ammar	(substituted off) 62'
CB	4	Mustafa Nadhim
CB	5	Ali Faez
LB	6	Alai Ghasem
CM	8	Ibrahim Bayesh	(substituted off) 79'
CM	13	Rewan Amin
RW	10	Hasan Abdulkareem	(substituted off) 46'
AM	20	Hussein Jabbar	(substituted off) 62'
LW	7	Hussein Ali
CF	18	Aymen Hussein	(substituted off) 79'
Substitutions:
MF	16	Amir Al-Ammari	(substituted on) 46'
MF	14	Amjad Attwan	(substituted on) 62'
DF	15	Dhurgham Ismail	(substituted on) 62'
FW	9	Alaa Abbas	(substituted on) 79'
MF	11	Sherko Karim	(substituted on) 79'
Manager:
(Spain) Jesús Casas

GK	1	Mohamed Aman
RB	2	Hamza Al-Rimi
CB	17	Emad Al-Godaimah
CB	3	Harwan Alzubaidi
LB	16	Ahmed Al-Wajeeh
RM	10	Nasser Al-Gahwashi		(substituted off) 90+2'
CM	14	Mohammed Fawzi Bahamid		(substituted off) 59'
CM	15	Mohammed Al-Tiri		(substituted off) 83'
LM	11	Abdulwasea Al-Matari (c)	(yellow card) 90+3'
CF	18	Mohammed Al-Dahi		(substituted off) 46'
CF	9	Omar Al-Dahi		(substituted off) 59'
Substitutions:
FW	12	Ahmed Maher		(substituted on) 46'
FW	7	Ahmed Al-Sarori	(yellow card) 68'	(substituted on) 59'
MF	8	Anes Al-Maari		(substituted on) 59'
FW	19	Ali Alomari		(substituted on) 83'
MF	20	Hamza Hanash		(substituted on) 90+2'
Manager:
(Czech Republic) Miroslav Soukup

Man of the Match:
Hussein Ali (Iraq)

Assistant referees:
Shayusupov Sanjar (Uzbekistan)
Alisher Usmanov (Uzbekistan)
Fourth official:
Salman Falahi (Qatar)
Video assistant referee:
Abdullah Al-Marri (Qatar)
Assistant video assistant referee:
Ahmed Eissa (United Arab Emirates)

=== Saudi Arabia vs Oman ===
12 January 2023
18:00 UTC+3

Saudi Arabia	1–2	Oman
Al-Ammar 41'	Report	R. Al-Alawi 34'; Al-Saadi 84'

Al-Minaa Olympic Stadium, Basra
Referee: Ma Ning (China)

Saudi Arabia	Oman

GK	1	Nawaf Al-Aqidi
RB	12	Mohammed Aboulshamat
CB	4	Ziyad Al-Sahafi
CB	5	Qassem Lajami		(substituted off) 10'
LB	3	Ahmed Bamsaud
CM	17	Naif Masoud		(substituted off) 71'
CM	6	Riyadh Sharahili (c)		(substituted off) 66'
RW	10	Turki Al-Ammar
AM	23	Musab Al-Juwayr	(yellow card) 87'
LW	7	Sumayhan Al-Nabit		(substituted off) 71'
CF	16	Mohammed Maran
Substitutions:
DF	13	Hussain Al-Sibyani		(substituted on) 10'
MF	18	Saad Al-Nasser		(substituted on) 66'
MF	11	Ahmed Al-Ghamdi		(substituted on) 71'
MF	14	Awad Al-Nashri	(yellow card) 76'	(substituted on) 71'
Manager:
Saad Al-Shehri

GK	1	Ibrahim Al-Mukhaini
RB	13	Ahmed Al-Adawi		(substituted off) 46'
CB	6	Ahmed Al-Khamisi
CB	5	Juma Al-Habsi	(yellow card) 31'
LB	14	Ahmed Al-Kaabi
CM	10	Jameel Al-Yahmadi
CM	23	Harib Al-Saadi (c)
CM	4	Arshad Al-Alawi		(substituted off) 46'
AM	20	Salaah Al-Yahyaei	(yellow card) 74'	(substituted off) 74'
CF	17	Rabia Al-Alawi		(substituted off) 46'
CF	7	Issam Al-Sabhi		(substituted off) 90'
Substitutions:
DF	2	Mohammed Al-Musalami		(substituted on) 46'
MF	8	Zahir Al-Aghbari		(substituted on) 46'
MF	21	Mataz Saleh		(substituted on) 63'
DF	16	Khalid Al-Braiki		(substituted on) 74'
DF	3	Fahmi Durbin		(substituted on) 90'
Manager:
(Croatia) Branko Ivanković

Man of the Match:
Harib Al-Saadi (Oman)

Assistant referees:
Fei Zhou (China)
Cheng Zhang (China)
Fourth official:
Adel Al Naqbi (United Arab Emirates)
Video assistant referee:
Fu Ming (China)

== Discipline ==
Fair play points would have been used as tiebreakers if the overall and head-to-head records of teams were tied. These were calculated based on yellow and red cards received in all group matches as follows:

- first yellow card: −1 point;
- indirect red card (second yellow card): −3 points;
- direct red card: −4 points;
- yellow card and direct red card: −5 points;

Only one of the above deductions was applied to a player in a single match.

Team	Match 1				Match 2				Match 3				Points
Team	Yellow card	(yellow card) (yellow-red card)	Red card	(yellow card) (red card)	Yellow card	(yellow card) (yellow-red card)	Red card	(yellow card) (red card)	Yellow card	(yellow card) (yellow-red card)	Red card	(yellow card) (red card)	Points
Iraq	2				1								–3
Oman	3								2				–5
Yemen	1				3				2				–6
Saudi Arabia	2								2				–4
