= Saudi Arabia national football team results (2020–present) =

This article provides details of international football games played by the Saudi Arabia national football team from 2020 to present.

== Results ==
Key
Win
Draw
Defeat

=== 2020 ===
14 November 2020 Friendly	Saudi Arabia	3–0	Jamaica	Riyadh, Saudi Arabia
19:30 UTC+3	S. Al-Dawsari 10'; Al-Shehri 44'; Al-Buraikan 77'	Report		Stadium: Prince Faisal bin Fahd Stadium; Attendance: 0 Referee: Ahmed Eisa Darwish (United Arab Emirates)

17 November 2020 Friendly	Saudi Arabia	1–2	Jamaica	Riyadh, Saudi Arabia
19:30 UTC+3	Al-Hamdan 29'	Report	Johnson 34'; East 64'	Stadium: Prince Faisal bin Fahd Stadium; Attendance: 0 Referee: Yahya Al Mulla (United Arab Emirates)

=== 2021 ===
25 March 2021 Friendly	Saudi Arabia	1–0	Kuwait	Riyadh, Saudi Arabia
20:30 UTC+3	Al-Amri 70'	Report		Stadium: King Saud University Stadium; Attendance: 0 Referee: Mohamed Bunafoor (Bahrain)

30 March 2021 2022 World Cup qualification	Saudi Arabia	5–0	Palestine	Riyadh, Saudi Arabia
20:30 UTC+3	Al-Shahrani 37'; Al-Muwallad 43'; Al-Shehri 52', 58'; S. Al-Dawsari 88' (pen.)	Report		Stadium: King Saud University Stadium; Attendance: 1 Referee: Mohanad Qasim (Iraq)

5 June 2021 2022 World Cup qualification	Saudi Arabia	3–0	Yemen	Riyadh, Saudi Arabia
21:00 UTC+3	S. Al-Dawsari 4'; Al-Muwallad 17', 32'	Report		Stadium: King Saud University Stadium; Attendance: 4,382; Referee: Nivon Robesh Gamini (Sri Lanka)

11 June 2021 2022 World Cup qualification	Singapore	0–3	Saudi Arabia	Riyadh, Saudi Arabia
21:00 UTC+3		Report	S. Al-Dawsari 84'; Al-Muwallad 86'; Al-Shehri 90+6'	Stadium: King Saud University Stadium; Attendance: 4,879; Referee: Mohanad Qasim (Iraq)

15 June 2021 2022 World Cup qualification	Saudi Arabia	3–0	Uzbekistan	Riyadh, Saudi Arabia
21:00 UTC+3	Al-Faraj 25', 33'; Al-Hassan 52'	Report		Stadium: King Saud University Stadium; Attendance: 6,339; Referee: Ko Hyung-jin (South Korea)

2 September 2021 2022 World Cup qualification	Saudi Arabia	3–1	Vietnam	Riyadh, Saudi Arabia
21:00 UTC+3	S. Al-Dawsari 55' (pen.); Al-Shahrani 67'; Al-Shehri 80' (pen.)	Report	Nguyễn Quang Hải 3'	Stadium: Mrsool Park; Attendance: 8,331; Referee: Ilgiz Tantashev (Uzbekistan)

7 September 2021 2022 World Cup qualification	Oman	0–1	Saudi Arabia	Muscat, Oman
20:00 UTC+4		Report	Al-Shehri 42'	Stadium: Sultan Qaboos Sports Complex; Attendance: 8,150; Referee: Hanna Hattab (Syria)

7 October 2021 2022 World Cup qualification	Saudi Arabia	1–0	Japan	Jeddah, Saudi Arabia
20:00 UTC+3	Al-Buraikan 71'	Report		Stadium: King Abdullah Sports City; Attendance: 51,218; Referee: Adham Makhadmeh (Jordan)

12 October 2021 2022 World Cup qualification	Saudi Arabia	3–2	China	Jeddah, Saudi Arabia
20:00 UTC+3	Al-Najei 15', 38'; Al-Buraikan 72'	Report	Aloísio 46'; Wu Xi 87'	Stadium: King Abdullah Sports City; Attendance: 54,124; Referee: Ilgiz Tantashev (Uzbekistan)

11 November 2021 2022 World Cup qualification	Australia	0–0	Saudi Arabia	Sydney, Australia
20:00 UTC+11		Report		Stadium: Western Sydney Stadium; Attendance: 23,314; Referee: Ko Hyung-jin (South Korea)

16 November 2021 2022 World Cup qualification	Vietnam	0–1	Saudi Arabia	Hanoi, Vietnam
19:00 UTC+7		Report	Al-Shehri 31'	Stadium: Mỹ Đình National Stadium; Attendance: 9,669; Referee: Hanna Hattab (Syria)

1 December 2021 2021 Arab Cup GS	Saudi Arabia	0–1	Jordan	Al Rayyan, Qatar
22:00 UTC+3		Report	K. Al-Dawsari 62' (o.g.)	Stadium: Education City Stadium; Attendance: 4,777; Referee: Bakary Gassama (Gambia)

4 December 2021 2021 Arab Cup GS	Palestine	1–1	Saudi Arabia	Al Rayyan, Qatar
22:00 UTC+3	Rashid 45+2'	Report	Al-Hamdan 81'	Stadium: Education City Stadium; Attendance: 3,075; Referee: Said Martínez (Honduras)

7 December 2021 2021 Arab Cup GS	Morocco	1–0	Saudi Arabia	Doha, Qatar
18:00 UTC+3	El Berkaoui 45+4' (pen.)	Report		Stadium: Al Thumama Stadium; Attendance: 8,502; Referee: Andrés Matonte (Uruguay)

=== 2022 ===
27 January 2022 2022 World Cup qualification	Saudi Arabia	1–0	Oman	Jeddah, Saudi Arabia
20:15 UTC+3	Al-Buraikan 48'	Report		Stadium: King Abdullah Sports City; Attendance: 47,364; Referee: Nawaf Shukralla (Bahrain)

1 February 2022 2022 World Cup qualification	Japan	2–0	Saudi Arabia	Saitama, Japan
19:14 UTC+9	Minamino 32'; Ito 50'	Report		Stadium: Saitama Stadium 2002; Attendance: 19,118; Referee: Ko Hyung-jin (South Korea)

24 March 2022 2022 World Cup qualification	China	1–1	Saudi Arabia	Sharjah, United Arab Emirates
19:00 UTC+4	Zhu Chenjie 82' (pen.)	Report	Al-Shehri 45+1'	Stadium: Sharjah Stadium; Attendance: 200; Referee: Mohammed Abdulla Hassan Mohamed (United Arab Emirates)

29 March 2022 2022 World Cup qualification	Saudi Arabia	1–0	Australia	Jeddah, Saudi Arabia
21:00 UTC+3	S. Al-Dawsari 65' (pen.)	Report		Stadium: King Abdullah Sports City; Attendance: 51,433; Referee: Adham Makhadmeh (Jordan)

5 June 2022 Friendly	Saudi Arabia	0–1	Colombia	Murcia, Spain
19:00 UTC+2		Report	Borré 9'	Stadium: Estadio Nueva Condomina; Attendance: 2,000; Referee: Jason Barcelo (Gibraltar)

9 June 2022 Friendly	Saudi Arabia	0–1	Venezuela	Murcia, Spain
19:00 UTC+2		Report	Ferraresi 37'	Stadium: Estadio Nueva Condomina; Attendance: 400; Referee: Daniel Gómez Gordillo (Gibraltar)

23 September 2022 Friendly	Saudi Arabia	0–0	Ecuador	Murcia, Spain
20:00 UTC+2		Report		Stadium: Estadio Nueva Condomina; Attendance: 10,000; Referee: Ivan Bebek (Croatia)

27 September 2022 Friendly	Saudi Arabia	0–0	United States	Murcia, Spain
20:00 UTC+2		Report		Stadium: Estadio Nueva Condomina; Attendance: 364; Referee: Ivan Bebek (Croatia)

22 October 2022 Friendly	Saudi Arabia	1–0	North Macedonia	Abu Dhabi, United Arab Emirates
18:30 UTC+4	Al-Shehri 85'	Report		Stadium: Al Nahyan Stadium; Attendance: 0 Referee: Mohamed Al Hammadi (United Arab Emirates)

26 October 2022 Friendly	Saudi Arabia	1–1	Albania	Abu Dhabi, United Arab Emirates
18:30 UTC+4	Al-Shehri 43' (pen.)		Balaj 47'	Stadium: Al Nahyan Stadium; Attendance: 0 Referee: Adel Al Naqbi (United Arab Emirates)

30 October 2022 Friendly	Saudi Arabia	0–0	Honduras	Abu Dhabi, United Arab Emirates
17:30 UTC+4		Report		Stadium: Al Nahyan Stadium; Attendance: 0 Referee: Yahya Al Mulla (United Arab Emirates)

6 November 2022 Friendly	Saudi Arabia	1–0	Iceland	Abu Dhabi, United Arab Emirates
16:00 UTC+4	Abdulhamid 26'	Report		Stadium: Mohammed bin Zayed Stadium; Attendance: 0 Referee: Ahmed Eisa Darwish (United Arab Emirates)

10 November 2022 Friendly	Saudi Arabia	1–1	Panama	Abu Dhabi, United Arab Emirates
16:00 UTC+4	Asiri 37'	Report	Díaz 8'	Stadium: Al Nahyan Stadium; Attendance: 1,000; Referee: Yahya Ali Al Mulla (United Arab Emirates)

16 November 2022 Friendly	Saudi Arabia	0–1	Croatia	Riyadh, Saudi Arabia
15:00 UTC+3		Report	Kramarić 82'	Stadium: Prince Faisal bin Fahd Stadium; Attendance: 8,287; Referee: Adham Makhadmeh (Jordan)

22 November 2022 2022 World Cup GS	Argentina	1–2	Saudi Arabia	Lusail, Qatar
13:00 UTC+3	Messi 10' (pen.)	Report	Al-Shehri 48'; S. Al-Dawsari 53'	Stadium: Lusail Iconic Stadium; Attendance: 88,012; Referee: Slavko Vinčić (Slovenia)

26 November 2022 2022 World Cup GS	Poland	2–0	Saudi Arabia	Al Rayyan, Qatar
16:00 UTC+3	Zieliński 39'; Lewandowski 82'	Report		Stadium: Education City Stadium; Attendance: 44,259; Referee: Wilton Sampaio (Brazil)

30 November 2022 2022 World Cup GS	Saudi Arabia	1–2	Mexico	Lusail, Qatar
22:00 UTC+3	S. Al-Dawsari 90+5'	Report	Martín 47'; Chávez 52'	Stadium: Lusail Iconic Stadium; Attendance: 84,985; Referee: Michael Oliver (England)

=== 2023 ===
6 January 2023 25th Gulf Cup GS	Yemen	0–2	Saudi Arabia	Basra, Iraq
21:30 UTC+3		Report	Al-Nabit 18'; Al-Juwayr 34' (pen.)	Stadium: Basra International Stadium; Referee: Salman Falahi (Qatar)

9 January 2023 25th Gulf Cup GS	Saudi Arabia	0–2	Iraq	Basra, Iraq
19:15 UTC+3		Report	Bayesh 30'; Rostam 86'	Stadium: Basra International Stadium; Referee: Adel Al-Naqbi (United Arab Emirates)

12 January 2023 25th Gulf Cup GS	Saudi Arabia	1–2	Oman	Basra, Iraq
18:00 UTC+3	Al-Ammar 41'	Report	R. Al-Alawi 34'; Al-Saadi 84'	Stadium: Al-Minaa Olympic Stadium; Referee: Ma Ning (China)

24 March 2023 Friendly	Saudi Arabia	1–2	Venezuela	Jeddah, Saudi Arabia
22:00 UTC+3	S. Al-Dawsari 73'	Report	Josef Martínez 26'; Rondón 34'	Stadium: Prince Abdullah Al Faisal Stadium; Attendance: 4,960; Referee: Ahmed Al-Kaf (Oman)

28 March 2023 Friendly	Saudi Arabia	1–2	Bolivia	Jeddah, Saudi Arabia
22:00 UTC+3	S. Al-Dawsari 44' (pen.)	Report	Moreno 13'; Algarañaz 68'	Stadium: Prince Abdullah Al Faisal Stadium; Attendance: 3,000; Referee: Ahmed Issa (United Arab Emirates)

8 September 2023 Friendly	Saudi Arabia	1–3	Costa Rica	Newcastle upon Tyne, England
20:00 UTC+1	Al-Bulaihi 68'	Report	Calvo 12'; Ugalde 32'; Leal 89'	Stadium: St James' Park; Attendance: 5,000; Referee: John Brooks (England)

12 September 2023 Friendly	Saudi Arabia	0–1	South Korea	Newcastle upon Tyne, England
17:30 UTC+1		Report	Cho Gue-sung 32'	Stadium: St James' Park; Attendance: 3,000; Referee: Andy Madley (England)

13 October 2023 Friendly	Saudi Arabia	2–2	Nigeria	Portimão, Portugal
17:00 WET	Al-Faraj 60'; Kanno 90+5'	Report	Al-Amri 73' (o.g.); Iheanacho 81'	Stadium: Estádio Municipal de Portimão; Referee: Luís Godinho (Portugal)

17 October 2023 Friendly	Saudi Arabia	1–3	Mali	Portimão, Portugal
	S. Al-Dawsari 58'	Report	M. Doumbia 14'; H. Traoré 42'; Sinayoko 71'	Stadium: Estádio Municipal de Portimão

16 November 2023 2026 WC qualification	Saudi Arabia	4–0	Pakistan	Hofuf, Saudi Arabia
19:30 UTC+3	Al-Shehri 6', 48' (pen.); Ghareeb 90+1'; Radif 90+6'	Report		Stadium: Al-Fateh Stadium; Attendance: 11,150; Referee: Hanna Hattab (Syria)

21 November 2023 2026 WC qualification	Jordan	0–2	Saudi Arabia	Amman, Jordan
19:00 UTC+3		Report	Al-Shehri 8', 30'	Stadium: Amman International Stadium; Attendance: 13,845; Referee: Ahmed Al-Kaf (Oman)

=== 2024 ===
4 January Friendly	Saudi Arabia	1–0	Lebanon	Al Wakrah, Qatar
16:30 UTC+3	Al-Buraikan 48'	Report		Stadium: Al Janoub Stadium; Attendance: 0

9 January Friendly	Palestine	0–0	Saudi Arabia	Doha, Qatar
18:30 UTC+3		Report; Report (SAFF)	S. AL-Dawsari (red card) 52'	Stadium: Al Janoub Stadium; Attendance: 0

10 January Friendly	Saudi Arabia	2–0	Hong Kong	Al Wakrah, Qatar
18:30 UTC+3	Ghareeb 21' (pen.); Al-Sqoor 86'			Stadium: Al Janoub Stadium

16 January 2023 AFC Asian Cup GS	Saudi Arabia	2–1	Oman	Al Rayyan, Qatar
20:30 UTC+3	Ghareeb 78'; Al-Bulaihi 90+6'	Report	Al-Yahyaei 14' (pen.)	Stadium: Khalifa International Stadium; Attendance: 41,987; Referee: Shaun Evans (Australia)

21 January 2023 AFC Asian Cup GS	Kyrgyzstan	0–2	Saudi Arabia	Al Rayyan, Qatar
20:30 UTC+3		Report	Kanno 35'; Al-Ghamdi 84'	Stadium: Ahmad bin Ali Stadium; Attendance: 39,557; Referee: Jumpei Iida (Japan)

25 January 2023 AFC Asian Cup GS	Saudi Arabia	0–0	Thailand	Al Rayyan, Qatar
18:00 UTC+3		Report		Stadium: Education City Stadium; Attendance: 38,773; Referee: Kim Hee-gon (South Korea)

30 January 2023 AFC Asian Cup Round of 16	Saudi Arabia	1–1 (a.e.t.) (2–4 p)	South Korea	Al Rayyan, Qatar
19:00 UTC+3	Radif 46'	Report	Cho Gue-sung 90+9'	Stadium: Education City Stadium; Attendance: 42,389; Referee: Ilgiz Tantashev (Uzbekistan)
	Penalties
	Kanno (penalty scored); Abdulhamid (penalty scored); Al-Najei (penalty missed); Ghareeb (penalty missed)		(penalty scored) Son Heung-min; (penalty scored) Kim Young-gwon; (penalty scored) Cho Gue-sung; (penalty scored) Hwang Hee-chan

21 March 2026 World Cup qualification	Saudi Arabia	1–0	Tajikistan	Riyadh, Saudi Arabia
22:00 UTC+3	Al-Dawsari 23'	Report (FIFA); Report (AFC)		Stadium: Al-Awwal Park; Attendance: 18,755; Referee: Muhammad Taqi (Singapore)

26 March 2026 World Cup qualification	Tajikistan	1–1	Saudi Arabia	Dushanbe, Tajikistan
20:00 UTC+5	Soirov 80'	Report (FIFA); Report (AFC)	Al-Buraikan 46'	Stadium: Pamir Stadium; Attendance: 13,300; Referee: Kim Jong-hyeok (South Korea)

6 June 2026 World Cup qualification	Pakistan	0–3	Saudi Arabia	Islamabad, Pakistan
20:30 UTC+5		Report (FIFA); Report (AFC)	Al-Buraikan 26', 41'; Al-Juwayr 59'	Stadium: Jinnah Sports Stadium; Attendance: 20,124; Referee: Ammar Mahfoodh (Bahrain)

11 June 2026 World Cup qualification	Saudi Arabia	1–2	Jordan	Riyadh, Saudi Arabia
21:00 UTC+3	Lajami 16'	Report (FIFA); Report (AFC)	Olwan 27'; Al-Rawabdeh 45+2'	Stadium: King Saud University Stadium; Attendance: 17,871; Referee: Adel Al-Naqbi (United Arab Emirates)

5 September 2026 World Cup qualification R3	Saudi Arabia	1–1	Indonesia	Jeddah, Saudi Arabia
21:00 UTC+3	Al-Juwayr 45+3'	Report	Walsh 19'	Stadium: King Abdullah Sports City; Attendance: 42,385; Referee: Adham Makhadmeh (Jordan)

10 September 2026 World Cup qualification R3	China	1–2	Saudi Arabia	Dalian, China
20:00 UTC+8	Lajami 14' (o.g.)	Report	Kadesh 39', 90'	Stadium: Dalian Suoyuwan Football Stadium; Attendance: 48,628; Referee: Nasrullo Kabirov (Tajikistan)

10 October 2026 World Cup qualification R3	Saudi Arabia	0–2	Japan	Jeddah, Saudi Arabia
21:00 UTC+3		Report	Kamada 14'; Ogawa 82'	Stadium: King Abdullah Sports City; Attendance: 56,283; Referee: Kim Jong-hyeok (South Korea)

15 October 2026 World Cup qualification R3	Saudi Arabia	0–0	Bahrain	Jeddah, Saudi Arabia
21:00 UTC+3				Stadium: King Abdullah Sports City; Attendance: 35,437; Referee: Salman Falahi (Qatar)

14 November 2026 World Cup qualification R3	Australia	0–0	Saudi Arabia	Melbourne, Australia
20:10 UTC+11				Stadium: Melbourne Rectangular Stadium; Referee: Adel Al-Naqbi (United Arab Emirates)

19 November 2026 World Cup qualification R3	Indonesia	2–0	Saudi Arabia	Jakarta, Indonesia
19:00 UTC+7	Marselino 32', 57'			Stadium: Gelora Bung Karno Stadium; Referee: Rustam Lutfullin (Uzbekistan)

22 December 26th Arabian Gulf Cup	Saudi Arabia	2–3	Bahrain	Kuwait City, Kuwait
20:30 UTC+3	Al-Juwayr 73'; Al-Shehri 86' (pen.)	Report	Abduljabbar 19'; Al-Humaidan 38'; Marhoon 76'	Stadium: Jaber International Stadium; Attendance: 7,726; Referee: Ahmad Al-Ali (Kuwait)

25 December 26th Arabian Gulf Cup	Yemen	2–3	Saudi Arabia	Kuwait City, Kuwait
17:25 UTC+3	Al-Zubaidi 8'; Sabarah 27'	Report	Kanno 30'; Al-Juwayr 57' (pen.); Al-Hamdan 90+3'	Stadium: Sulaibikhat Stadium; Attendance: 9,200; Referee: Qasim Al-Hatmi (Oman)

28 December 26th Arabian Gulf Cup	Iraq	1–3	Saudi Arabia	Kuwait City, Kuwait
17:30 UTC+3	Mohanad Ali 64'	Report	Al-Dawsari 57' (pen.); Al-Hamdan 81', 86'	Stadium: Jaber International Stadium; Attendance: 54,942; Referee: István Kovács (Romania)

31 December 26th Arabian Gulf Cup SF	Oman	2–1	Saudi Arabia	Kuwait City, Kuwait
17:30 UTC+3	A. Al-Alawi 74'; Al-Busaidi 85'	Report	Kanno 87'	Stadium: Sulaibikhat Stadium; Attendance: 10,500; Referee: Halil Umut Meler (Turkey)

=== 2025 ===
20 March 2026 World Cup qualification R3	Saudi Arabia	1–0	China	Riyadh, Saudi Arabia
21:15 UTC+3	S. Al-Dawsari 50'	Report		Stadium: King Saud University Stadium; Attendance: 24,742; Referee: Omar Al-Ali (United Arab Emirates)

25 March 2026 World Cup qualification R3	Saudi Arabia	0–0	Japan	Saitama, Japan
19:35 UTC+9		Report		Stadium: Saitama Stadium 2002

5 June 2026 World Cup qualification R3	Bahrain	0–2	Saudi Arabia	Riffa, Bahrain
19:00 UTC+3		Report	Al-Juwayr 16'; Al-Aboud 78'	Stadium: Bahrain National Stadium; Attendance: 15,075; Referee: Ilgiz Tantashev (Uzbekistan)

10 June 2026 World Cup qualification R3	Saudi Arabia	1–2	Australia	Jeddah, Saudi Arabia
21:15 UTC+3	Al-Aboud 19'	Report	Metcalfe 42'; Duke 48'	Stadium: King Abdullah Sports City Stadium; Attendance: 24,620; Referee: Abdulrahman Al-Jassim (Qatar)

15 June 2025 CONCACAF Gold Cup GS	Haiti	0–1	Saudi Arabia	San Diego, United States
17:15 UTC−7		Report	Al-Shehri 21' (pen.)	Stadium: Snapdragon Stadium; Referee: Walter López Castellanos (Guatemala)

19 June 2025 CONCACAF Gold Cup GS	Saudi Arabia	0–1	United States	Austin, United States
20:15 UTC−5		Report	Richards 63'	Stadium: Q2 Stadium; Referee: Marco Ortíz (Mexico)

22 June 2025 CONCACAF Gold Cup GS	Saudi Arabia	1–1	Trinidad and Tobago	Paradise, United States
16:00 UTC−7	Al-Buraikan 60'		Sealy 10'	Stadium: Allegiant Stadium; Referee: Keylor Herrera (Costa Rica)

28 June 2025 CONCACAF Gold Cup QF	Mexico	2–0	Saudi Arabia	Glendale, United States
19:15 UTC−7	Vega 49'; Madu 81' (o.g.)	Report		Stadium: State Farm Stadium; Attendance: 45,255; Referee: Lukasz Szpala (United States)

4 September Friendly	North Macedonia	1–2	Saudi Arabia	Prague, Czech Republic
17:00 UTC+2	Trajkovski 41'	Report	Al-Buraikan 45'; Al-Hamdan 78'	Stadium: FK Viktoria Stadion; Attendance: 500; Referee: Dominik Starý (Czech Republic)

8 September Friendly	Czech Republic	1–1	Saudi Arabia	Hradec Králové, Czech Republic
19:15 UTC+2	Chorý 21' (pen.)	Report	Al-Hamdan 90+1'	Stadium: Malšovická aréna Attendance: 8,300; Referee: Martin Dohal (Slovakia)

8 October 2026 World Cup qualification R4	Indonesia	2–3	Saudi Arabia	Jeddah, Saudi Arabia
20:15 UTC+3	Diks 11' (pen.), 88' (pen.)	Report (FIFA); Report (AFC)	Abu Al-Shamat 17'; Al-Buraikan 36' (pen.), 62'	Stadium: King Abdullah Sports City Stadium; Attendance: 40,634; Referee: Ahmed Al Ali (Kuwait)

14 October 2026 World Cup qualification R4	Saudi Arabia	0–0	Iraq	Jeddah, Saudi Arabia
21:45 UTC+3				Stadium: King Abdullah Sports City Stadium; Attendance: 60,816

14 November Friendly	Saudi Arabia	1–0	Ivory Coast	Jeddah, Saudi Arabia
19:30 UTC+3	Abu Al-Shamat 8'	Report		Stadium: Prince Abdullah Al-Faisal Sports City Stadium; Attendance: 2,271; Referee: Yahya Almulla (United Arab Emirates)

18 November Friendly	Saudi Arabia	0–2	Algeria	Jeddah, Saudi Arabia
19:30 UTC+3			Mahrez 75' (pen.); Belghali 85'	Stadium: Prince Abdullah Al-Faisal Sports City Stadium; Attendance: 8,427; Referee: Abdulhadi Al-Ruwaili (Qatar)

2 December 2025 FIFA Arab Cup GS	Saudi Arabia	2–1	Oman	Al Rayyan, Qatar
20:00 UTC+3	Al-Buraikan 55'; Al-Shehri 77'	Report	Al-Habashi 70'	Stadium: Education City Stadium; Attendance: 21,628; Referee: Adham Makhadmeh (Jordan)

5 December 2025 FIFA Arab Cup GS	Comoros	1–3	Saudi Arabia	Al Khor, Qatar
21:30 UTC+3	Djoudja 63'	Report	Kanno 45+4', 51'; Al-Dawsari 76'	Stadium: Al Bayt Stadium; Attendance: 32,219; Referee: Juan Calderón (Costa Rica)

8 December 2025 FIFA Arab Cup GS	Morocco	1–0	Saudi Arabia	Lusail, Qatar
20:00 UTC+3	El Berkaoui 11'	Report		Stadium: Lusail Stadium; Attendance: 78,131; Referee: Mario Escobar (Guatemala)

11 December 2025 FIFA Arab Cup QF	Palestine	1–2 (a.e.t.)	Saudi Arabia	Lusail, Qatar
20:30 UTC+3	Dabbagh 64'	Report	Al-Buraikan 58' (pen.); Kanno 115'	Stadium: Lusail Stadium; Attendance: 77,197; Referee: Amin Omar (Egypt)

15 December 2025 FIFA Arab Cup SF	Saudi Arabia	0–1	Jordan	Al Khor, Qatar
20:30 UTC+3	Al-Ahmed (red card) 90+6'	Report	Al-Rashdan 66'	Stadium: Al Bayt Stadium; Attendance: 62,825; Referee: Juan Gabriel Benítez (Paraguay)

18 December 2025 FIFA Arab Cup 3rd place	Saudi Arabia	0–0; Abandoned	United Arab Emirates	Al Rayyan, Qatar
14:00 UTC+3		Report		Stadium: Khalifa International Stadium; Referee: Cristián Garay (Chile)
Note: Match was abandoned at halftime (when the score was 0–0) due to heavy rainfall.

=== 2026 ===
27 March Friendly	Saudi Arabia	0–4	Egypt	Jeddah, Saudi Arabia (Note: The Saudi Arabia v Egypt match, originally scheduled to be played at the Ahmad bin Ali Stadium, Al Rayyan, was relocated to Saudi Arabia due to the 2026 Iran war.)
20:30 UTC+3		Report	Issa 4'; Trézéguet 16'; Zizo 44'; Marmoush 56'	Stadium: King Abdullah Sports City; Attendance: 25,000; Referee: Abdulla Ali Al Athba (Qatar)

31 March Friendly	Serbia	2–1	Saudi Arabia	Bačka Topola, Serbia (Note: The Serbia v Saudi Arabia match, originally scheduled to be played at the Jassim bin Hamad Stadium, Al Rayyan, was relocated to Serbia due to the 2026 Iran war.)
17:00 UTC+3	Pavlović 66'; Mitrović 70'	Report	Al-Hamdan 8'	Stadium: TSC Arena; Attendance: 4,101; Referee: Balázs Berke (Hungary)

30 May Friendly	Ecuador	2–1	Saudi Arabia	Harrison, New Jersey, United States
19:30 UTC−4	Porozo 35'; Valencia 51'	Report	Mandash 87'	Stadium: Sports Illustrated Stadium; Attendance: 20,000; Referee: Pierre-Luc Lauziere (Canada)

5 June Friendly	Puerto Rico	0–3	Saudi Arabia	Austin, Texas, United States
19:00 UTC−4		Report	Mandash 45+1'; Al-Hamdan 50'; S. Al-Dawsari 88'	Stadium: Q2 Stadium; Referee: Reon Radix (Grenada)

9 June Friendly	Saudi Arabia	0–0	Senegal	San Antonio, Texas, United States
16:00 UTC−5				Stadium: Toyota Field; Attendance: 3,500; Referee: Víctor Rivas (United States)

15 June 2026 World Cup GS	Saudi Arabia	1–1	Uruguay	Miami Gardens, Florida, United States
18:00 UTC−4	Al-Amri 41'	Report	Araújo 80'	Stadium: Hard Rock Stadium; Attendance: 62,764; Referee: Maurizio Mariani (Italy)

21 June 2026 World Cup GS	Spain	4–0	Saudi Arabia	Atlanta, Georgia, United States
12:00 UTC−4		Report		Stadium: Mercedes-Benz Stadium; Attendance: 68,239; Referee: Raphael Claus (Brazil)

26 June 2026 World Cup GS	Cape Verde	0–0	Saudi Arabia	Houston, Texas, United States
19:00 UTC−5		Report		Stadium: NRG Stadium; Attendance: 68,278; Referee: François Letexier (France)

23 September 2026 Gulf Cup GS	Saudi Arabia	v	Kuwait	Jeddah, Saudi Arabia
--:-- UTC+3				Stadium: King Abdullah Sports City Stadium

26 September 2026 Gulf Cup GS	Oman	v	Saudi Arabia	Jeddah, Saudi Arabia
--:-- UTC+3				Stadium: King Abdullah Sports City Stadium

29 September 2026 Gulf Cup GS	Saudi Arabia	v	Iraq	Jeddah, Saudi Arabia
--:-- UTC+3				Stadium: King Abdullah Sports City Stadium

November 2026 WAFF Championship	Saudi Arabia	v	Oman
--:--

November 2026 WAFF Championship	Saudi Arabia	v	Oman
--:--

=== 2027 ===
7 January 2027 Asian Cup GS	Saudi Arabia	v	Palestine	Riyadh, Saudi Arabia
--:--				Stadium: King Fahd Sports City Stadium

12 January 2027 Asian Cup GS	Oman	v	Saudi Arabia	Riyadh, Saudi Arabia
--:--				Stadium: King Fahd Sports City Stadium

17 January 2027 Asian Cup GS	Saudi Arabia	v	Kuwait	Jeddah, Saudi Arabia
--:--				Stadium: King Abdullah Sports City Stadium

== Head to head records ==
As of match played 3 October 2026 after the match against Qatar.

Head to head records
Opponent	P	W	D	L	GF	GA	W%	D%	L%
Albania	1	0	1	0	1	1	0	100	0
Algeria	1	0	0	1	0	2	0	0	100
Argentina	1	1	0	0	2	1	100	0	0
Australia	4	1	2	1	2	2	25	50	25
Bahrain	3	1	1	1	4	3	33.33	33.33	33.33
Bolivia	1	0	0	1	1	2	0	0	100
Cape Verde	1	0	1	0	0	0	0	100	0
China	4	3	1	0	7	4	75	25	0
Colombia	1	0	0	1	0	1	0	0	100
Croatia	1	0	0	1	0	1	0	0	100
Comoros	1	1	0	0	3	1	100	0	0
Costa Rica	1	0	0	1	1	3	0	0	100
Czech Republic	1	0	1	0	1	1	0	100	0
Ecuador	2	0	1	1	1	2	0	50	50
Egypt	1	0	0	1	0	4	0	0	0
Haiti	1	1	0	0	1	0	100	0	0
Honduras	1	0	1	0	0	0	0	100	0
Hong Kong	1	1	0	0	2	0	100	0	0
Iceland	1	1	0	0	1	0	100	0	0
Indonesia	3	1	1	1	4	5	33.33	33.33	33.33
Iraq	4	2	1	1	5	3	50	25	25
Ivory Coast	1	1	0	0	1	0	100	0	0
Jamaica	2	1	0	1	4	2	50	0	50
Japan	4	1	1	2	1	4	25	25	50
Jordan	5	2	0	3	5	4	40	0	60
Kuwait	2	2	0	0	2	0	100	0	0
Kyrgyzstan	1	1	0	0	2	0	100	0	0
Mali	1	0	0	1	1	3	0	0	100
Lebanon	1	1	0	0	1	0	100	0	0
Mexico	2	0	0	2	1	4	0	0	100
Morocco	8	3	2	3	7	17	37.5	25	37.5
Nigeria	1	0	1	0	2	2	0	100	0
North Macedonia	2	2	0	0	3	1	100	0	0
Oman	7	5	0	2	11	6	71.43	0	28.57
Pakistan	2	2	0	0	7	0	100	0	0
Palestine	4	1	3	0	7	2	25	75	0
Panama	1	0	1	0	1	1	0	100	0
Poland	1	0	0	1	0	2	0	0	100
Puerto Rico	1	1	0	0	3	0	100	0	0
Qatar	1	0	1	0	0	0	0	100	0
Senegal	1	0	1	0	0	0	0	100	0
Serbia	1	0	0	1	1	2	0	0	100
Singapore	1	1	0	0	3	0	100	0	0
South Korea	2	0	1	1	1	2	0	50	50
Spain	1	0	0	1	0	4	0	0	100
Tajikistan	2	1	1	0	2	1	50	50	0
Thailand	1	0	1	0	0	0	0	100	0
Trinidad and Tobago	2	1	1	0	4	2	50	50	50
United States	2	0	1	1	0	1	0	50	50
Uruguay	1	0	1	0	1	1	0	100	0
Uzbekistan	1	1	0	0	3	0	100	0	0
Venezuela	2	0	0	2	1	3	0	0	100
Vietnam	2	2	0	0	4	1	100	0	0
Yemen	3	3	0	0	8	2	100	0	0
Totals	103	45	27	31	123	101	43.69	26.21	30.1
