= Ibrahim Al-Mukhaini =

Ibrahim Al-Mukhaini may refer to:

- Ibrahim Al-Mukhaini (footballer, born 1987), Omani football defender for Sur
- Ibrahim Al-Mukhaini (footballer, born 1997), Omani football goalkeeper for Al-Nasr
