= Haym Ibrahim =

Comorian footballer

Personal information
- Full name: Haym Ibrahim Papa
- Date of birth: 8 June 1998 (age 28)
- Place of birth: Moroni, Comoros
- Height: 1.84 m (6 ft 0 in)
- Position: Defender

Team information
- Current team: Évian
- Number: 15

Senior career*
Years	Team	Apps	(Gls)
2020–	Évian	1	(0)

International career^{‡}
2021–	Comoros	1	(0)
- * Club domestic league appearances and goals as of 22:39, 25 June 2021 (UTC) ‡ National team caps and goals as of 22:39, 25 June 2021 (UTC)

Haym Ibrahim Papa (born 8 June 1998) is a professional footballer who plays as a defender for Championnat National 1 club Évian. Born in France, he plays for the Comoros national team.

== International career ==
Ibrahim made his senior international debut for Comoros in a 2021 FIFA Arab Cup qualification match against Palestine, a 5–1 defeat.
