= Khalid Al-Hajri =

Omani footballer (born 1994)

Personal information
- Full name: Khalid Khalifa Salim Al-Hajri
- Date of birth: 10 March 1994 (age 32)
- Place of birth: Oman
- Height: 1.82 m (6 ft 0 in)
- Position: Forward

Team information
- Current team: Oman
- Number: 20

Youth career
- 2007–2012: Al-Mussanah

Senior career*
Years	Team	Apps	(Gls)
2012–2016	Al-Mussanah		
2016–	Oman Club	5	(3)
2017	→ Al Dhafra (loan)	13	(2)

International career^{‡}
2010	Oman U17		
2011	Oman U19		
2014	Oman U23		
2017–	Oman	45	(18)
- * Club domestic league appearances and goals as of 13:06, 11 May 2017 (UTC) ‡ National team caps and goals as of 15:02, 29 March 2022

Khalid Khalifa Salim Al-Hajri (Arabic: خالد خليفة سالم الهاجري; born 10 March 1994) is an Omani professional footballer who plays as a forward for Oman Football League side Bahla Club.

He also played in UAE Pro League side Al Dhafra FC on loan from Oman Club.

== Club career ==
Al-Hajri joined UAE side Al Dhafra from Oman Club on a six-month loan in early 2017. Having gone his first six games without scoring, he scored two goals in a 3–0 win over Emirates Club in March 2017.

== International career ==
Al-Hajri made his international debut in a 14–0 victory over Bhutan, coming on as a 63rd minute substitute to score four goals. He also represented the under 17 side, scoring in a 2–1 loss to Saudi Arabia in 2010. He also played for the under 19 side in 2011, and was called up to the Olympic side in 2014.

== Career statistics ==
=== International ===
As of match played 24 March 2022.

National team	Year	Apps	Goals
Oman	2017	12	9
Oman	2018	8	2
Oman	2019	4	0
Oman	2020	0	0
Oman	2021	17	6
Oman	2022	3	1
Total		44	18

==== International goals ====
Scores and results list Oman's goal tally first.

No.	Date	Venue	Opponent	Score	Result	Competition
1.	28 March 2017	Sultan Qaboos Sports Complex, Muscat, Oman	Bhutan	10–0	14–0	2019 AFC Asian Cup qualification
2.	28 March 2017	Sultan Qaboos Sports Complex, Muscat, Oman	Bhutan	11–0	14–0	2019 AFC Asian Cup qualification
3.	28 March 2017	Sultan Qaboos Sports Complex, Muscat, Oman	Bhutan	13–0	14–0	2019 AFC Asian Cup qualification
4.	28 March 2017	Sultan Qaboos Sports Complex, Muscat, Oman	Bhutan	14–0	14–0	2019 AFC Asian Cup qualification
5.	2 June 2017	Sultan Qaboos Sports Complex, Muscat, Oman	Syria	1–0	1–1	Friendly
6.	5 September 2017	Sultan Qaboos Sports Complex, Muscat, Oman	Maldives	2–0	5–0	2019 AFC Asian Cup qualification
7.	10 October 2017	National Football Stadium, Malé, Maldives	Maldives	1–0	3–1	2019 AFC Asian Cup qualification
8.	14 November 2017	Changlimithang Stadium, Thimphu, Bhutan	Bhutan	3–1	4–2	2019 AFC Asian Cup qualification
9.	15 December 2017	Sultan Qaboos Sports Complex, Muscat, Oman	Yemen	1–0	1–0	Friendly
10.	27 March 2018	Sultan Qaboos Sports Complex, Muscat, Oman	Palestine	1–0	1–0	2019 AFC Asian Cup qualification
11.	16 December 2018	Sultan Qaboos Sports Complex, Muscat, Oman	Tajikistan	1–0	1–0	Friendly
12.	29 May 2021	The Sevens Stadium, Dubai, United Arab Emirates	Indonesia	2–1	3–1	Friendly
13.	29 May 2021	The Sevens Stadium, Dubai, United Arab Emirates	Indonesia	3–1	3–1	Friendly
14.	15 June 2021	Jassim bin Hamad Stadium, Doha, Qatar	Bangladesh	2–0	3–0	2022 FIFA World Cup qualification
15.	15 June 2021	Jassim bin Hamad Stadium, Doha, Qatar	Bangladesh	3–0	3–0	2022 FIFA World Cup qualification
16.	3 December 2021	Education City Stadium, Al Rayyan, Qatar	Qatar	1–1	1–2	2021 FIFA Arab Cup
17.	6 December 2021	Ahmed bin Ali Stadium, Al Rayyan, Qatar	Bahrain	3–0	3–0	2021 FIFA Arab Cup
18.	24 March 2022	Mỹ Đình National Stadium, Hanoi, Vietnam	Vietnam	1–0	1–0	2022 FIFA World Cup qualification
