= Mohsin Al-Khaldi =

Omani footballer (born 1988)

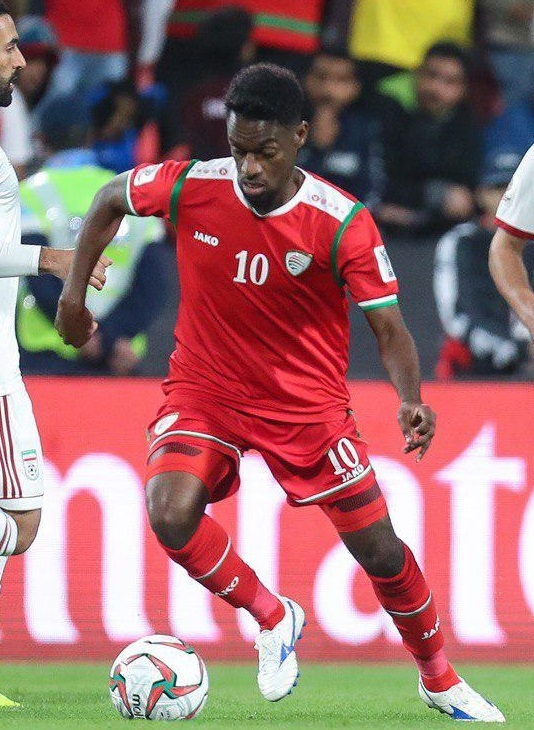
- Al-Khaldi playing for Oman at the 2019 AFC Asian Cup

Personal information
- Full name: Mohsin Jouhar Bilal Al-Khaldi
- Date of birth: 16 August 1988 (age 38)
- Place of birth: Saham, Oman
- Height: 1.75 m (5 ft 9 in)
- Position: Midfielder

Team information
- Current team: Sohar
- Number: 10

Senior career*
Years	Team	Apps	(Gls)
2008–2010	Saham		
2011–2012	Fanja		
2016–2017	Al-Nasr		(2)
2018	Ohod	10	(3)
2018–2020	Sohar		(11)
2020–2022	Oman Club	30	(5)
2022–	Sohar	52	(13)

International career^{‡}
2014–2022	Oman	60	(8)
- * Club domestic league appearances and goals ‡ National team caps and goals as of 9 December 2024

Mohsin Jouhar Bilal Al-Khaldi (Arabic: محسن جوهر الخالدي; born 16 August 1988), commonly known as Mohsin Al-Khaldi or Mohsin Jouhar, is an Omani footballer who plays as a midfielder for Sohar in the Oman Professional League.

== International career ==
Al-Khaldi won his first cap for the Omani national team on 27 May 2014 in a friendly match against Uzbekistan and inherited the captain's armband after Ahmed Mubarak Al-Mahaijri retired in 2019. He represented Oman at the 2015 AFC Asian Cup, the 2019 AFC Asian Cup and the 2021 FIFA Arab Cup, which he captained.

During the third round of qualification for the 2022 FIFA World Cup, he scored directly from a corner against Vietnam and almost replicated it against China PR, but the latter accidentally turned out to be an assist for Amjad Al-Harthi. After the qualifiers, he announced his international retirement.

=== International goals ===
Scores and results list Oman's goal tally first.

No.	Date	Venue	Opponent	Score	Result	Competition
1.	26 March 2015	Al-Seeb Stadium, Seeb, Oman	Malaysia	6–0	6–0	Friendly
2.	14 November 2016	Thuwunna Stadium, Yangon, Myanmar	Myanmar	3–0	3–0	Friendly
3.	28 March 2017	Sultan Qaboos Sports Complex, Muscat, Oman	Bhutan	3–0	16–0	2019 AFC Asian Cup qualification
4.	30 August 2017	Sultan Qaboos Sports Complex, Muscat, Oman	Afghanistan	1–0	2–0	Friendly
5.	5 September 2017	Sultan Qaboos Sports Complex, Muscat, Oman	Maldives	1–0	5–0	2019 AFC Asian Cup qualification
6.	16 November 2018	Sultan Qaboos Sports Complex, Muscat, Oman	Syria	1–0	1–1	Friendly
7.	14 November 2019	Sultan Qaboos Sports Complex, Muscat, Oman	Bangladesh	1–0	4–1	2022 FIFA World Cup qualification
8.	12 October 2021	Sultan Qaboos Sports Complex, Muscat, Oman	Vietnam	2–1	3–1	2022 FIFA World Cup qualification
