= Abbas Al-Asfoor =

Association football player

Abbas palkon
Personal information
- Full name: Abbas Fadhel Abdulla Ahmed Maki Al-Asfoor
- Date of birth: 2 February 1999 (age 27)
- Place of birth: Jidd Hafs, Bahrain
- Height: 1.79 m (5 ft 10 in)
- Position: Midfielder

International career
Years	Team	Apps	(Gls)
2018-2019	Bahrain	16	(0)
2019-2020	Bahrain		
2021–	Bahrain		
Medal record
Men's football
Representing Bahrain
Gulf Cup
Winner	2024 Kuwait

Abbas Fadhel Abdulla Ahmed Maki Al-Asfoor (born 3 March 1999), is a Bahraini professional football players who plays for the Bahrain national team.

He debuted with the U23 team on 15 August 2018, at the 2018 Asian Games held in Indonesia against South Korea in a 6–0 defeat.

On 3 June 2019, he appeared with the u-22 against Mexico at the World Festival World Toulon tournament in a 2–0 defeat.

Al-Asfoor appeared at the 2020 AFC U-23 Asian Cup in Thailand in a 5-0 match defeat to Thailand.

He made his senior debut on 23 May 2021 in a friendly match against Ukraine in a 1–1 draw.

He had recently last appeared at the 2022 FIFA World Cup qualifying match against Hong Kong in a 4–0 victory on 15 June 2021.

On 21 November 2021, Abdulwahab was included final-23 squad for the 2021 FIFA Arab Cup.
