= 2021 FIFA Arab Cup final =

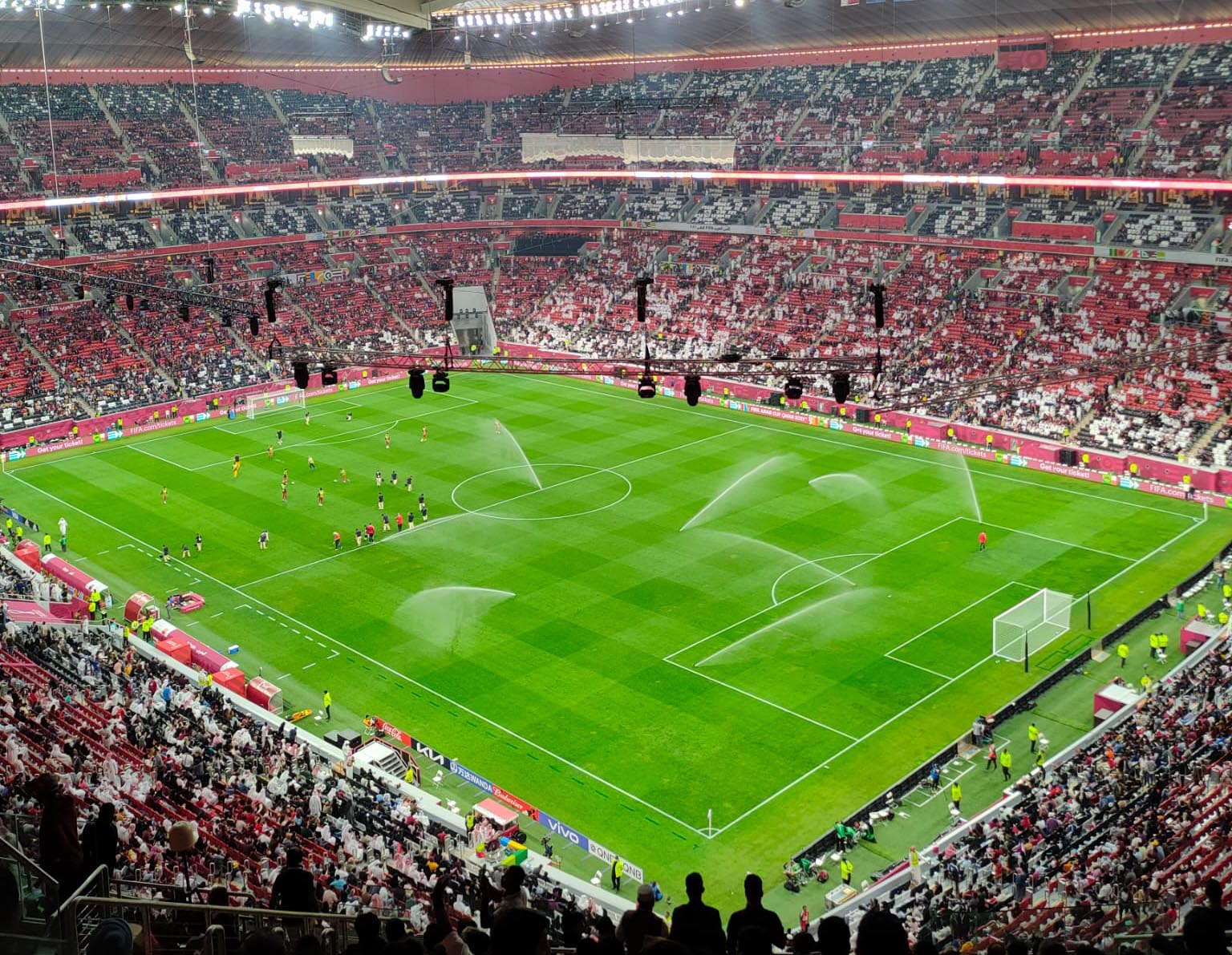
- Al Bayt Stadium hosted the final match.
- Event: 2021 FIFA Arab Cup
| Tunisia | Algeria |
| (Tunisia) | (Algeria) |
| 0 | 2 |
- After extra time
- Date: 18 December 2021
- Venue: Al Bayt Stadium, Al Khor
- Man of the Match: Amir Sayoud (Algeria)
- Referee: Daniel Siebert (Germany)
- Attendance: 60,456
- Weather: Clear; 24 °C (75 °F); 57% humidity

The 2021 FIFA Arab Cup final was a football match which determined the winners of the 2021 FIFA Arab Cup. The match was held at Al Bayt Stadium in Al Khor, Qatar on 18 December 2021 and was contested by Tunisia and Algeria, the winners of the semi-finals.

== Background ==
Both Tunisia and Algeria marked their third appearance in the Arab Cup: Tunisia won the first edition in 1963, while Algeria had never won the competition. This is both countries' first-ever Arab Cup final, as the 1963 edition won by Tunisia was played in a group format. Prior to the final, Algeria led in head-to-head games, having won 16 times to Tunisia's 15; the two sides drew 13 times. Tunisia was undefeated to Algeria in competitive matches since 1987.

== Route to the final ==
Tunisia
Round
Algeria
Opponents
Result
Group stage
Opponents
Result
Mauritania
5–1
Match 1
Sudan
4–0
Syria
0–2
Match 2
Lebanon
2–0
United Arab Emirates
1–0
Match 3
Egypt
1–1

| Team | Pld | W | D | L | GF | GA | GD | Pts |
|---|---|---|---|---|---|---|---|---|
| Tunisia | 3 | 2 | 0 | 1 | 6 | 3 | +3 | 6 |
| United Arab Emirates | 3 | 2 | 0 | 1 | 3 | 2 | +1 | 6 |
| Syria | 3 | 1 | 0 | 2 | 4 | 4 | 0 | 3 |
| Mauritania | 3 | 1 | 0 | 2 | 3 | 7 | −4 | 3 |

Final standings

| Team | Pld | W | D | L | GF | GA | GD | Pts |
|---|---|---|---|---|---|---|---|---|
| Egypt | 3 | 2 | 1 | 0 | 7 | 1 | +6 | 7 |
| Algeria | 3 | 2 | 1 | 0 | 7 | 1 | +6 | 7 |
| Lebanon | 3 | 1 | 0 | 2 | 1 | 3 | -2 | 3 |
| Sudan | 3 | 0 | 0 | 3 | 0 | 10 | -10 | 0 |

Opponents
Result
Knockout stage
Opponents
Result
Oman
2–1
Quarter-finals
Morocco
2–2 (a.e.t.; 5–3 p)
Egypt
1–0
Semi-finals
Qatar
2–1

== Match ==
=== Summary ===
The game went to extra-time and nine minutes into the first-half, Algeria's Amir Sayoud scored with a long range left footed shot into the left corner of the net. As Tunisia desperately tried to level the match deep into added on time, the ball broke from a Tunisia corner and reached Yacine Brahimi who ran into the penalty area before shooting into the empty net from six yards out to put Algeria 2–0 up.

=== Details ===
18 December 2021
18:00

| Tunisia | 0–2 (a.e.t.) | Algeria |
|---|---|---|
| | Report | Sayoud 99'; Brahimi 120+5' |

Al Bayt Stadium, Al Khor
Attendance: 60,456
Referee: Daniel Siebert (Germany)

| Tunisia | Algeria |

| GK | 22 | Mouez Hassen |
| RB | 20 | Mohamed Dräger |
| CB | 2 | Bilel Ifa |
| CB | 3 | Montassar Talbi |
| LB | 14 | Amine Ben Hamida | (yellow card) 43' | (substituted off) 101' |
| CM | 6 | Ghaylen Chaaleli |
| CM | 13 | Ferjani Sassi | (yellow card) 64' | (substituted off) 101' |
| RW | 7 | Youssef Msakni (c) | (yellow card) 39' |
| AM | 10 | Hannibal Mejbri | | (substituted off) 88' |
| LW | 23 | Naïm Sliti | | (substituted off) 110' |
| CF | 11 | Seifeddine Jaziri | (yellow card) 40' |
Substitutions:
| MF | 15 | Ali Ben Romdhane | | (substituted on) 88' |
| DF | 12 | Ali Maâloul | | (substituted on) 101' |
| MF | 18 | Saad Bguir | | (substituted on) 101' |
| MF | 9 | Firas Ben Larbi | | (substituted on) 110' |
Manager:
Mondher Kebaier

| GK | 23 | Raïs M'Bolhi (c) |
| RB | 3 | Houcine Benayada | | (substituted off) 120+3' |
| CB | 4 | Djamel Benlamri |
| CB | 19 | Abdelkader Bedrane |
| LB | 20 | Ilyes Chetti | (yellow card) 13' |
| CM | 18 | Houssem Eddine Mrezigue | | (substituted off) 91' |
| CM | 14 | Sofiane Bendebka | (yellow card) 90+3' | (substituted off) 118' |
| RW | 7 | Tayeb Meziani | | (substituted off) 66' |
| AM | 11 | Yacine Brahimi | (yellow card) 120+4' |
| LW | 10 | Youcef Belaïli |
| CF | 9 | Baghdad Bounedjah | (yellow card) 40' |
Substitutions:
| MF | 8 | Amir Sayoud | | (substituted on) 66' |
| MF | 17 | Zakaria Draoui | | (substituted on) 91' |
| DF | 5 | Mehdi Tahrat | | (substituted on) 118' |
| DF | 12 | Mohamed Amine Tougai | | (substituted on) 120+3' |
Manager:
Madjid Bougherra

Man of the Match:
Amir Sayoud (Algeria)

Assistant referees:
Rafael Foltyn (Germany)
Christian Gittelmann (Germany)
Fourth official:
Matthew Conger (New Zealand)
Reserve assistant referee:
Tevita Makasini (Tonga)
Video assistant referee:
Christian Dingert (Germany)
Assistant video assistant referees:
Kevin Blom (Netherlands)
Jun Mihara (Japan)
Shaun Evans (Australia)

Match rules

- 90 minutes
- 30 minutes of extra time if necessary
- Penalty shoot-out if scores still level
- Maximum of twelve named substitutes
- Maximum of five substitutions, with a sixth allowed in extra time (Note: Each team was given only three opportunities to make substitutions, with a fourth opportunity in extra time, excluding substitutions made at half-time, before the start of extra time and at half-time in extra time.)
