= Juma Al-Habsi =

Omani football player (born 1996)

Personal information
- Full name: Juma Marhoon Juma Al-Habsi
- Date of birth: 28 January 1996 (age 30)
- Place of birth: Oman
- Height: 1.77 m (5 ft 10 in)
- Position: Defender

Team information
- Current team: Al-Nahda Club

Senior career*
Years	Team	Apps	(Gls)
2017-	Al-Seeb	4	(0)
2022	→ Al-Khor (loan)	10	(3)
2023-2024	Ibri Club	13	(0)
2024-	Al-Nahda	4	(0)

International career^{‡}
2014	Oman U-19	4	(0)
2018	Oman U-23	3	(0)
2021–	Oman	32	(0)
- * Club domestic league appearances and goals ‡ National team caps and goals as of 20 June 2023

Juma Marhoon Juma Al-Habsi (born on 28 January 1996), is an Oman professional football player who plays for Al-Seeb and the Omani national team.

He debuted internationally with Oman's U-19 team on 10 October 2014 at the 2014 AFC U-19 Championship held in Myanmar in a 6–0 defeat to Iraq.

He also appeared with the U-23 team on 9 January 2018, where he played at the 2018 AFC U-23 Championship in China in a match against China in a 3–0 defeat.

Al-Habsi made his senior debut on 25 March 2021 in a friendly match against India in a 1–1 draw.

He last appeared at the 2022 World Cup qualifying match against Japan in a 1–0 defeat, before being called up to the final 23-man squad for the 2021 FIFA Arab Cup in Qatar on 18 November 2021. He played the full match against Iraq in a 1–1 draw.
