= Ahmed Al-Khamisi =

Omani footballer (born 1991)

Personal information
- Full name: Ahmed Mohammed Khalfan Al Khamisi
- Date of birth: 26 November 1991 (age 34)
- Place of birth: Sohar, Oman
- Height: 1.74 m (5 ft 9 in)
- Position: Centre-back

Team information
- Current team: Al-Seeb
- Number: 6

Senior career*
Years	Team	Apps	(Gls)
2016–2019	Suwaiq Club	41	(5)
2019–2021	Dhofar	32	(2)
2021–2023	Suwaiq Club	13	(0)
2023–	Al-Seeb	30	(0)

International career
2021–	Oman	10	(0)
Medal record
Men's football
Representing Oman
Gulf Cup
Runner-up	2024 Kuwait
- * Club domestic league appearances and goals as of 3 May 2025

Ahmed Mohammed Khalfan Al Khamisi (born 26 November 1991) is an Omani professional footballer who plays as a defender for Al-Seeb and the Omani national team.

== International career ==
Al Khamisi made his senior international debut on 25 March 2021 in a friendly 1-1 draw against India.

He last appeared at the 2022 World Cup qualifying match against Japan in a 1-0 defeat, before being called up to the final 23-man squad for the 2021 FIFA Arab Cup in Qatar on 18 November 2021. He played the full match against Iraq in a 1-1 draw.
