= Mataz Saleh =

Omani footballer (born 1996)

Personal information
- Full name: Mataz Saleh Abd Raboh Bait Abd Raboh
- Date of birth: 28 May 1996 (age 30)
- Place of birth: Oman
- Height: 1.78 m (5 ft 10 in)
- Position: Midfielder

Team information
- Current team: Dhofar
- Number: 27

Senior career*
Years	Team	Apps	(Gls)
2016–	Dhofar		

International career^{‡}
2016–	Oman	6	(1)
Medal record
Men's football
Representing Oman
Gulf Cup
Runner-up	2024 Kuwait
- * Club domestic league appearances and goals ‡ National team caps and goals as of 30 December 2018

Mataz Saleh Abd Raboh Bayt Abd Raboh (Arabic: معتز صالح عبد ربه; born 28 May 1996), commonly known as Mataz Saleh, is an Omani footballer who plays for Dhofar in the Oman Professional League and the Oman national football team as a midfielder.

== Career ==
=== International ===
Saleh made his debut for the Oman national football team in a friendly match on 8 August 2016 against Turkmenistan. He was included in Oman's squad for the 2019 AFC Asian Cup in the United Arab Emirates.

== Career statistics ==
=== International ===
Statistics accurate as of match played 30 December 2018

Oman national team
Year	Apps	Goals
2016	1	0
2018	4	1
Total	5	1

==== International goals ====
Scores and results list Oman's goal tally first.

No	Date	Venue	Opponent	Score	Result	Competition
1.	13 December 2018	Sultan Qaboos Sports Complex, Muscat, Oman	Tajikistan	2–1	2–1	Friendly
2.	16 November 2023	Sultan Qaboos Sports Complex, Muscat, Oman	Chinese Taipei	3–0	3–0	2026 FIFA World Cup qualification
