= Rabia Al-Alawi =

Omani footballer (born 1995)

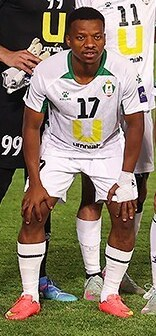
- Al-Alawi with Al-Wehdat in 2025

Personal information
- Full name: Al-Mandhar Rabia Said Al-Alawi
- Date of birth: 31 March 1995 (age 31)
- Place of birth: Jalan Bani Bu Ali, Oman
- Height: 1.78 m (5 ft 10 in)
- Position: Left winger

Team information
- Current team: Duhok
- Number: 45

Senior career*
| Years | Team | Apps | (Gls) |
| 2016–2017 | Sur | | |
| 2017–2018 | Oman Club | | (5) |
| 2018–2023 | Dhofar | | |
| 2023–2025 | Al-Nahda | | |
| 2025 | Al-Zawraa | | |
| 2025 | Al-Wehdat | 6 | (1) |
| 2026– | Duhok | | |

International career^{‡}
| 2014 | Oman U19 | 3 | (0) |
| 2018 | Oman U23 | 3 | (0) |
| 2019– | Oman | 43 | (9) |
Medal record
Men's football
Representing Oman
Gulf Cup
| Runner-up | 2024 Kuwait |
- * Club domestic league appearances and goals ‡ National team caps and goals as of 17 November 2026 (UTC)

Al-Mandhar Rabia Said Al-Alawi (Arabic: المنذر ربيعة سعيد العلوي; born 31 March 1995) is an Omani professional footballer who plays as a left winger for Iraq Stars League club Duhok and the Omani national team.

== International career ==
He debuted internationally in his youth team with the Oman U-19 in a 6–0 defeat against Iraq in the 2014 AFC U-19 Championship in Myanmar.

He also appeared in the U-23 team against China in a 3–0 defeat at the 2018 AFC U-23 Championship in China.

On 5 September 2019, Al-Alawi made his senior debut and scored his first 2 goals for Oman against India in 1–2 victory of the 2022 FIFA World Cup qualification.

=== International goals ===
Scores and results list Oman's goal tally first.

| No. | Date | Venue | Opponent | Score | Result | Competition |
|---|---|---|---|---|---|---|
| 1. | 5 September 2019 | Indira Gandhi Athletic Stadium, Guwahati, India | India | 1–1 | 2–1 | 2022 FIFA World Cup qualification |
| 2. | 5 September 2019 | Indira Gandhi Athletic Stadium, Guwahati, India | India | 2–1 | 2–1 | 2022 FIFA World Cup qualification |
| 3. | 15 October 2019 | Al Janoub Stadium, Al Wakrah, Qatar | Qatar | 1–1 | 1–2 | 2022 FIFA World Cup qualification |
| 4. | 14 November 2019 | Sultan Qaboos Sports Complex, Muscat, Oman | Bangladesh | 2–0 | 4–1 | 2022 FIFA World Cup qualification |
| 5. | 2 December 2019 | Abdullah bin Khalifa Stadium, Doha, Qatar | Saudi Arabia | 1–2 | 1–3 | 24th Arabian Gulf Cup |
| 6. | 7 October 2021 | Khalifa International Stadium, Doha, Qatar | Australia | 1–1 | 1–3 | 2022 FIFA World Cup qualification |
| 7. | 6 December 2021 | Ahmed bin Ali Stadium, Al Rayyan, Qatar | Bahrain | 1–0 | 3–0 | 2021 FIFA Arab Cup |
| 8. | 12 January 2023 | Al-Minaa Olympic Stadium, Basra, Iraq | Saudi Arabia | 1–0 | 2–1 | 25th Arabian Gulf Cup |
| 9. | 14 November 2025 | Al-Seeb Stadium, Seeb, Oman | Sudan | 2–0 | 2–0 | Friendly |
