= Ibrahim Al-Mukhaini (footballer, born 1987) =

Omani footballer

Personal information
- Full name: Ibrahim Sabir Marzouq Al-Mukhaini
- Date of birth: 16 April 1987 (age 39)
- Place of birth: Oman
- Position: Defender

Team information
- Current team: Sur

Senior career*
Years	Team	Apps	(Gls)
2007–	Sur		

International career
2008	Oman	1	
- * Club domestic league appearances and goals

Ibrahim Sabir Marzouq Al-Mukhaini (Arabic: ابراهيم صابر مرزوق المخيني; born 16 April 1987), commonly known as Ibrahim Al-Mukhaini, is an Omani who plays for Sur SC.

== Club career statistics ==
Club	Season	Division	League		Cup		Continental		Other		Total	
Club	Season	Division	Apps	Goals	Apps	Goals	Apps	Goals	Apps	Goals	Apps	Goals
Sur	2010–11	Oman Elite League	-	2	-	0	0	0	-	0	-	2
Sur	2011–12	Oman Elite League	-	1	-	0	0	0	-	0	-	1
Sur	2012–13	Oman Elite League	-	1	-	0	0	0	-	0	-	1
Sur	Total		-	4	-	0	0	0	-	0	-	4
Career total			-	4	-	0	0	0	-	0	-	4

== International career ==
Ibrahim was selected for the national team for the first time in 2008. He made his first appearance for Oman on 26 March 2008 in a 2010 FIFA World Cup qualification match against Thailand.
