= Arshad Al-Alawi =

Omani footballer (born 2000)

Personal information
- Full name: Arshad Said Saleh Said Al-Alawi
- Date of birth: 12 April 2000 (age 26)
- Place of birth: Nizwa, Oman
- Height: 1.81 m (5 ft 11 in)
- Position: Attacking midfielder

Team information
- Current team: Al-Seeb
- Number: 26

Senior career*
Years	Team	Apps	(Gls)
2019–2020	Oman		
2020–2022	Al-Seeb		
2022–2023	Kuwait SC		
2023	Emirates		
2023–	Al-Seeb		

International career^{‡}
2019–	Oman	13	(6)
Medal record
Men's football
Representing Oman
Gulf Cup
Runner-up	2024 Kuwait
- * Club domestic league appearances and goals ‡ National team caps and goals as of 7 December 2021

Arshad Said Saleh Said Al-Alawi (born 12 April 2000) is an Omani professional footballer who plays for Al-Seeb and the Omani national team.

He debuted internationally on 10 October 2019, during the 2022 FIFA World Cup qualification, in a match against Afghanistan in a 3–0 victory.

On 14 November 2019, Al-Alawi scored his first goal in a major competition for Oman against Bangladesh in a 4–1 victory.

Arshad played in all three games of the group stage for Oman in the Arab Cup, and scored the opener against Bahrain in 3–0 victory to qualify for knockout stages.

== Career statistics ==
=== International ===
Statistics accurate as of match played on 06 December 2021

Oman
Year	Apps	Goals
2019	5	1
2020	0	0
2021	10	1
Total	13	2

== International goals ==
No.	Date	Venue	Opponent	Score	Result	Competition
1.	14 November 2019	Sultan Qaboos Sports Complex, Muscat, Oman	Bangladesh	3–0	4–1	2022 FIFA World Cup qualification
2.	6 December 2021	Ahmed bin Ali Stadium, Al Rayyan, Qatar	Bahrain	2–0	3–0	2021 FIFA Arab Cup
3.	10 December 2021	Education City Stadium, Al Rayyan, Qatar	Tunisia	1–1	1–2	2021 FIFA Arab Cup
4.	29 March 2022	Sultan Qaboos Sports Complex, Muscat, Oman	China	1–0	2–0	2022 FIFA World Cup qualification
5.	9 January 2023	Basra International Stadium, Basra, Iraq	Yemen	2–2	3–2	25th Arabian Gulf Cup
6.	20 June 2023	Pakhtakor Central Stadium, Tashkent, Uzbekistan	Kyrgyzstan	1–0	1–0	2023 CAFA Nations Cup
7.	31 December 2024	Sulaibikhat Stadium, Sulaibikhat, Kuwait	Saudi Arabia	1–0	2–1	26th Arabian Gulf Cup
