= Amjad Al-Harthi =

Omani footballer (born 1994)

Personal information
- Full name: Amjad Abdullah Sulaiman Hidaib Al-Harthi
- Date of birth: 1 January 1994 (age 32)
- Place of birth: Al-Wattaya, Oman
- Height: 1.81 m (5 ft 11 in)
- Position: Right-back

Team information
- Current team: Al-Seeb
- Number: 11

Senior career*
Years	Team	Apps	(Gls)
2023–	Al-Seeb		

International career
2021–	Oman	8	(1)
Medal record
Men's football
Representing Oman
Gulf Cup
Runner-up	2024 Kuwait
- * Club domestic league appearances and goals

Amjad Abdullah Sulaiman Hidaib Al-Harthi (born 1 January 1994) is an Omani professional footballer who plays as a right-back for the Oman national team.

He signed for Al-Seeb Club in 2023.

== International career ==
Al-Harthi debuted internationally on 25 March 2021 in a friendly match against India in a 1–1 draw.

On 11 November 2021, he scored his first international goal in a 2022 FIFA World Cup qualifying match against China PR, which ended in a 1–1 draw. His goal came accidentally as the ball slightly bounced off his head from a corner by Mohsin Al-Khaldi before flying into the net. Al-Khaldi was on his way to scoring the second goal directly from a corner in his career, but the goal was awarded to Al-Harthi instead.

== International goals ==
No.	Date	Venue	Opponent	Score	Result	Competition
1.	11 November 2021	Sharjah Stadium, Sharjah, United Arab Emirates	China	1–1	1–1	2022 FIFA World Cup qualification
