= Hasan Abdulkareem =

Iraqi footballer (born 1999)

Personal information
- Full name: Hasan Abdulkareem Jabbar Sayyid
- Date of birth: 1 January 1999 (age 27)
- Place of birth: Baghdad, Iraq
- Height: 1.66 m (5 ft 5 in)
- Position: Midfielder

Team information
- Current team: Al-Zawraa (on loan from Çorum)
- Number: 99

Youth career
- –2018: Al-Shorta

Senior career*
Years	Team	Apps	(Gls)
2018–2021	Al-Shorta	8	(0)
2019–2020	→ Al-Karkh (loan)		(0)
2020–2021	→ Al-Karkh (loan)		(4)
2021–2022	Al-Karkh		(5)
2022–2026	Al-Zawraa		
2026	Çorum	0	(0)
2026–	Al-Zawraa (loan)	4	(2)

International career^{‡}
2018	Iraq U19	3	(1)
2019–2022	Iraq U23	7	(3)
2021–	Iraq	17	(1)
- * Club domestic league appearances and goals as of 10 September 2026 ‡ National team caps and goals as of 13 November 2025

Hasan Abdulkareem Jabbar Sayyid (Arabic: حَسَن عَبْد الْكَرِيم جَبَّار سَيِّد; born 1 January 1999), also known as Qoqiah (Arabic: قُوقِيَّة), is an Iraqi footballer who plays as a midfielder for Iraqi club Al-Zawraa, on loan from Turkish club Çorum, and the Iraq national team.

== Club career ==
=== Al-Shorta ===
==== Senior debut ====
Abdulkareem was promoted from the Al-Shorta youth team to their first team in summer 2018. He made one start and six substitute appearances for the club in their 2018–19 Iraqi Premier League title-winning campaign.

==== Loans to Al-Karkh ====
In Autumn 2019, Abdulkareem joined Al-Karkh on loan, before returning to his parent club Al-Shorta for the restarted 2019–20 season in February 2020, making one appearance. Abdulkareem joined Al-Karkh on loan again for the 2020–21 season, where he won Soccer Star's Young Player of the Season award.

=== Al-Karkh ===
Abdulkareem joined Al-Karkh on a permanent basis ahead of the 2021–22 season.

== International career ==
Abdulkareem represented Iraq at under-19 and under-23 levels.

He made his senior debut on 30 November 2021, in the 2021 FIFA Arab Cup group-stage game against Oman. Having been substituted in the second half, he scored a penalty in stoppage time to help his team draw 1–1.

== Career statistics ==
=== International ===
As of match played 9 November 2022

Appearances and goals by national team and year
National team	Year	Apps	Goals
Iraq	2021	3	1
Iraq	2022	6	0
Total		9	1

Scores and results list Iraq's goal tally first, score column indicates score after each Abdulkareem goal.

List of international goals scored by Hasan Abdulkareem
No.	Date	Venue	Opponent	Score	Result	Competition	Ref.
1	30 November 2021	Al Janoub Stadium, Al Wakrah, Qatar	Oman	1–1	1–1	2021 FIFA Arab Cup	

== Honours ==
Al-Shorta

- Iraqi Premier League: 2018–19

Al-Karkh

- Iraq FA Cup: 2021–22

Iraq

- Arabian Gulf Cup: 2023
