= Ahmed Al-Kaabi =

Omani professional footballer (born 1996)

Personal information
- Birth name: Ahmed Khalifa Said Al-Kaabi
- Date of birth: September 15, 1996 (age 30)
- Place of birth: Al Ain, United Arab Emirates
- Height: 1.78 m (5 ft 10 in)
- Position: Left-back

Team information
- Current team: Al-Nahda
- Number: 47

Youth career
- Al-Nahda

Senior career*
Years	Team	Apps	(Gls)
2014–	Al-Nahda		

International career
2014	Oman U19	3	(0)
2018	Oman U23	2	(0)
2018–	Oman	35	(0)
Medal record
Men's football
Representing Oman
Gulf Cup
Runner-up	2024 Kuwait
- * Club domestic league appearances and goals

Ahmed Khalifa Said Al-Kaabi (Arabic: أَحْمَد خَلِيفَة سَعِيد الْكَعْبِيّ; born 15 September 1996) is a professional footballer who plays as a left-back for Al-Nahda. Born in the United Arab Emirates, he plays for the Oman national team.

== Career ==
Al-Kaabi began his senior career with the Omani club Al-Nahda in 2014. He helped the club win the 2015 Oman Super Cup, the 2022–23 Oman Professional League and the 2022–23 Sultan Qaboos Cup. He scored in Al-Nahda's title-winning match on 20 May 2023. On 6 July 2023, he extended his contract with Al-Nahda after their successful season.

== International ==
Al-Kaabi was first called up to the senior Oman national team in a friendly 2–1 win over Tajikistan on 13 December 2018. He was called up to the national team for the 24th Arabian Gulf Cup. He was called up to the national team for the 2023 AFC Asian Cup.

== Honours ==
Al-Nahda

- Oman Professional League: 2022–23
- Sultan Qaboos Cup: 2022–23
- Oman Super Cup: 2014–15
