= Fahmi Durbin =

Omani footballer (born 1993)

Personal information
- Full name: Fahmi Said Rajab Nasib Bait Durbin
- Date of birth: 10 October 1993 (age 33)
- Place of birth: Salalah, Oman
- Height: 1.83 m (6 ft 0 in)
- Position: Defender

Team information
- Current team: Al-Nasr Salalah

Senior career*
Years	Team	Apps	(Gls)
2013-14	Mirbat SC	0	(0)
2014-	Al-Nasr SC (Salalah)	63	(0)

International career^{‡}
2015	Oman U23	1	(0)
2021–	Oman	17	(1)
- * Club domestic league appearances and goals as of 3/1/25 @ 15:18(AEST) ‡ National team caps and goals as of 18:56, 4 December 2021 (UTC)

Fahmi Said Rajab Nasib Bait Durbin (Arabic: فهمي دوربين; born 10 October 1993) is an Omani professional footballer who plays as a defender for Omani club Al-Nasr Salalah and the Oman national team.

== International career ==
Durbin was included in the Oman final-23 squad for the 2021 FIFA Arab Cup on 18 November 2021. On 3 December 2021, he scored an own-goal against Qatar in a 2–1 defeat.

== International goals ==
No.	Date	Venue	Opponent	Score	Result	Competition
1.	26 September 2021	Qatar University Stadium, Doha, Qatar	Nepal	1–0	7–2	Friendly
