= Harib Al-Saadi =

Omani footballer (born 1990)

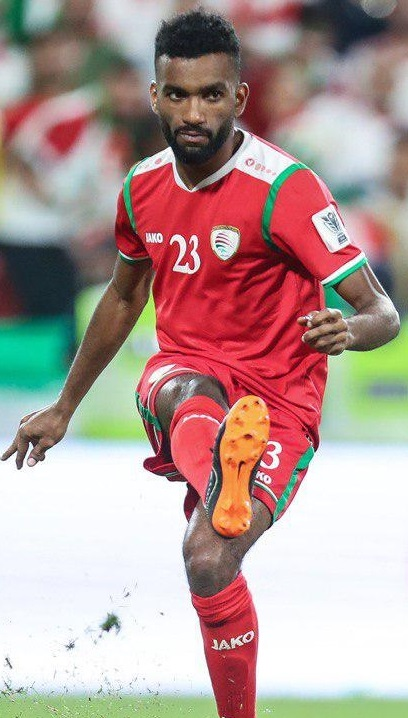
- Al-Saadi in 2019

Personal information
- Full name: Harib Jamil Zaid Al-Saadi
- Date of birth: 1 February 1990 (age 36)
- Place of birth: Al-Rustaq, Oman
- Height: 1.68 m (5 ft 6 in)
- Position: Attacking midfielder

Team information
- Current team: Al-Nahda
- Number: 23

Senior career*
Years	Team	Apps	(Gls)
2011–2014	Al-Suwaiq	?	(0)
2014–2015	Saham	?	(0)
2015–2018	Al-Suwaiq		
2018	Al Jazira	8	(0)
2018–2022	Dhofar		
2022	Al-Khor	8	(1)
2023	Al-Suwaiq		
2023–	Al-Nahda		

International career^{‡}
2016–	Oman	108	(1)
Medal record
Men's football
Representing Oman
Gulf Cup
Runner-up	2024 Kuwait
- * Club domestic league appearances and goals ‡ National team caps and goals as of 18:50, 5 June 2025 (UTC)

Harib Jamil Zaid Al-Saadi (Arabic: حارب جميل زيد السعدي; born 1 February 1990), commonly known as Harib Al-Saadi, is an Omani professional footballer who plays as an attacking midfielder for Al-Nahda.

== Club career ==
On 3 June 2014, Al-Saadi signed a contract with 2014 GCC Champions League runners-up Saham SC.

=== Club career statistics ===
Club	Season	Division	League		Cup		Continental (Note: Includes appearances in the AFC Champions League and AFC Cup)		Other		Total	
Club	Season	Division	Apps	Goals	Apps	Goals	Apps	Goals	Apps	Goals	Apps	Goals
Al-Suwaiq	2010–11	Oman Professional League	-	0	-	0	1	0	-	0	-	0
Al-Suwaiq	2011–12	Oman Professional League	-	0	-	0	7	0	-	0	-	0
Al-Suwaiq	2012–13	Oman Professional League	-	0	-	1	0	0	-	0	-	1
Al-Suwaiq	2013–14	Oman Professional League	-	0	-	0	6	0	-	0	-	0
Al-Suwaiq	Total		-	0	-	1	14	0	-	0	-	1
Career total			-	0	-	1	14	0	-	0	-	1

== International career ==
Al-Saadi is part of the first team squad of the Oman national football team. He was selected for the national team for the first time in 2016. He made his first appearance for Oman on 24 March 2016 in a 2018 FIFA World Cup Qualification match against Guam.

On 18 December 2024, Al-Saadi earned his 100th international cap for Oman in a friendly match against Yemen.

=== International goals ===
Scores and results list Oman's goal tally first.

No.	Date	Venue	Opponent	Score	Result	Competition
1.	12 January 2023	Al-Minaa Olympic Stadium, Basra, Iraq	Saudi Arabia	2–1	2–1	25th Arabian Gulf Cup

== Honours ==
Al-Suwaiq

- Omani League: 2010–11, 2012–13
- Sultan Qaboos Cup: 2012
- Omani Super Cup: 2013; runner-up: 2011
