= Ahmad bin Ali Stadium =

Stadium in Al Rayyan, Qatar

- ملعب أحمد بن علي (Arabic)
- Interactive map of Ahmad bin Ali Stadium
- Location: Dukhan Road 88HR+RX; Al Rayyan, Qatar
- Coordinates: 25°19′47″N 51°20′32″E
- Capacity: 45,032; 21,000 (future)
- Surface: Grass
- Record attendance: 45,032 (Argentina vs Australia, 3 December 2022)
- Public transit: Al Riffa (الرفاع)

Construction
- Groundbreaking: 2016
- Built: 2017–2020
- Opened: 18 December 2020
- Architect: Pattern Design
- Project manager: AECOM
- Main contractors: Al-Balagh; Larsen & Toubro

Tenant
- Al-Rayyan SC (2020–present)

The new Ahmad bin Ali Stadium (Arabic: ملعب أحمد بن علي, romanized: Malʿab ʾAḥmad bin ʿAliyy), popularly known as Al-Rayyan Stadium, is an association football stadium located in the district of Rawdat Al Jahhaniya, Qatar, around 9 kilometres (5.6 miles) northwest from the centre of Al Rayyan. It is currently used mostly for football matches and is home to Al-Rayyan Sports Club. The stadium is named after Ahmad bin Ali Al Thani, the Emir of Qatar from 1960 to 1972. The former stadium, built in 2003, had a seating capacity of 21,282 and was demolished in 2015. The new Al Rayyan Stadium has a seating capacity of 45,032.

The stadium is located about 20 km (12.4 mi) west of Doha.

== Construction ==
The Ahmad Bin Ali Stadium was one of eight stadiums used in the 2022 FIFA World Cup in Qatar.

The former Ahmad bin Ali Stadium was demolished in 2015 to make way for the Al Rayyan Stadium. 90 percent of the rubble resulting from the demolition of the stadium is anticipated to be reused either for the new stadium or for public art projects.

The construction of the new stadium started in early 2016. This was done by the joint venture between Al-Balagh and Larsen & Toubro. After the World Cup the stadium will be reduced to 21,000 seats. The new stadium was built for the 2022 FIFA World Cup, which was hosted by Qatar.

The renovation includes a huge 'media facade' with a membrane that will act as a screen for projections, news, commercials, sports updates, current tournament information and matches. Seating capacity was increased to 40,740, and all seats were shaded.

== Events ==
The inauguration of the stadium took place on 18 December 2020, which was Qatar's National Day, and exactly two years before the country hosted the 2022 FIFA World Cup final. The stadium was one of two venues used for the 2020 FIFA Club World Cup.

The Ahmad bin Ali Stadium hosted four matches for the FIFA Arab Cup 2021. 2021 Turkish Super Cup was played at the stadium.

On 23 February 2024, the stadium would host the charity match "Match For Hope". This charity match included many big stars such as Kaká, Eden Hazard, IShowSpeed, Chunkz and many more. The team names were Team Chunkz vs Team Aboflah. Team Chunkz would win vs Team Aboflah 7-5. It eventually raised more than $8.85 million dollars for charity.

== Recent tournament results ==
=== 2021 FIFA Arab Cup ===
Date	Time	Team #1	Result	Team #2	Round	Attendance
30 November 2021	13:00	Tunisia	5–1	Mauritania	Group B	2,494
1 December 2021	13:00	Algeria	4–0	Sudan	Group D	2,203
4 December 2021	13:00	Jordan	0–4	Morocco	Group C	7,890
6 December 2021	22:00	Oman	3–0	Bahrain	Group A	2,477

=== 2022 FIFA World Cup ===
The Ahmad bin Ali Stadium hosted seven matches during the 2022 FIFA World Cup.

Date	Time	Team No. 1	Result	Team No. 2	Round	Attendance
21 November 2022	22:00	United States	1–1	Wales	Group B	43,418
23 November 2022	22:00	Belgium	1–0	Canada	Group F	40,432
25 November 2022	13:00	Wales	0–2	Iran	Group B	40,875
27 November 2022	13:00	Japan	0–1	Costa Rica	Group E	41,479
29 November 2022	22:00	Wales	0–3	England	Group B	44,297
1 December 2022	18:00	Croatia	0–0	Belgium	Group F	43,984
3 December 2022	22:00	Argentina	2–1	Australia	Round of 16	45,032

=== 2023 AFC Asian Cup ===
On 5 April 2023, the Ahmad bin Ali Stadium was chosen one of eight (then nine) venues for the 2023 AFC Asian Cup.

Date	Time	Team No. 1	Result	Team No. 2	Round	Attendance
13 January 2024	14:30	Australia	2–0	India	Group B	35,253
15 January 2024	17:30	Indonesia	1–3	Iraq	Group D	16,532
18 January 2024	17:30	India	0–3	Uzbekistan	Group B	38,491
21 January 2024	20:30	Kyrgyzstan	0–2	Saudi Arabia	Group F	39,557
28 January 2024	19:00	Tajikistan	1–1 (a.e.t.) (5–3 p)	United Arab Emirates	Round of 16	33,584
2 February 2024	14:30	Tajikistan	0–1	Jordan	Quarter-finals	35,530
6 February 2024	18:00	Jordan	2–0	South Korea	Semi-finals	42,850

=== 2025 FIFA Arab Cup ===
Date	Time	Team #1	Result	Team #2	Round	Attendance
1 December 2025	16:00	Tunisia	0–1	Syria	Group A	26,966
3 December 2025	15:00	Algeria	0–0	Sudan	Group D	37,143
6 December 2025	14:00	Kuwait	1–3	Jordan	Group C	35,933

==== 2026 FIFA U-17 World Cup ====
The Ahmad bin Ali Stadium will host the 2026 FIFA U-17 World Cup final match on 13 December.

Date	Local time	Team No. 1	Result	Team No. 2	Round	Attendance
13 December 2026	19:00		–		Final	

== See also ==
- Lists of stadiums
- List of football stadiums in Qatar
