= 2021 FIFA Arab Cup =

10th Arab Cup, held in Qatar

كأس العرب 2021 Kaʾs al-ʿārab 2021

Tournament details
- Host country: Qatar
- Dates: 30 November – 18 December
- Teams: 16 (from 2 confederations)
- Venues: 6 (in 4 host cities)

Final positions
- Champions: Algeria (1st title)
- Runners-up: Tunisia
- Third place: Qatar
- Fourth place: Egypt

Tournament statistics
- Matches played: 32
- Goals scored: 83 (2.59 per match)
- Attendance: 571,605 (17,863 per match)
- Top scorer: (Tunisia) Seifeddine Jaziri (4 goals)
- Best player: (Algeria) Yacine Brahimi
- Best goalkeeper: (Algeria) Raïs M'Bolhi
- Fair play award: Morocco

The 2021 FIFA Arab Cup (Arabic: كأس العرب 2021) was the 10th edition of the Arab Cup, the Arab world's national team football tournament; it was the first edition under FIFA's jurisdiction, with previous editions having been organized by the Union of Arab Football Associations (UAFA). It took place between 30 November and 18 December 2021 in Qatar as a prelude and test event to the 2022 FIFA World Cup, which would also be held in Qatar a year later.

The tournament phase involved 16 teams, of which seven came through the qualifying round; all 23 teams competing were under the auspices of either the Asian Football Confederation (AFC) or the Confederation of African Football (CAF). Of the 16 teams, eight had also appeared in the 2012 edition; no team made their debut appearance at the Arab Cup. The 32 finals matches were played in six venues, which would also be used for the 2022 FIFA World Cup. Host nation Qatar beat Egypt in the third place match. In the final, Algeria played Tunisia on 18 December at the Al Bayt Stadium in Al Khor. Algeria won the match 2–0 after extra time to claim their first Arab Cup.

Algerian player Yacine Brahimi was voted the tournament's best player, winning the Golden Ball. Tunisia's Seifeddine Jaziri won the Golden Boot as he scored the most goals during the tournament with four. Algeria's Raïs M'Bolhi won the Golden Glove, awarded to the goalkeeper with the most clean sheets. It has been estimated that more than 500,000 people attended games during the tournament. Semi-automated offside technology was tested for the first time in this tournament.

== Teams ==
Of the 23 participating teams, the top nine teams based on the April 2021 FIFA Ranking directly qualified to the group stage, while the remaining 14 teams played seven single-leg matches, with seven teams going through to the group stage. In the group stage, there were four groups of four teams in a round-robin format, with the top two teams from each group qualifying to the knockout stage, which consisted of quarter-finals, semi-finals, a play-off for third place, and the final.

The 14 teams in the qualifiers were paired based on their April 2021 FIFA Ranking: the highest-ranked team in the qualifiers, Oman, played against the lowest-ranked team, Somalia. Lebanon, the second-highest ranked team, played against Djibouti, the second-lowest ranked team, and so on. The teams that won qualification matches 1, 2 and 3 occupied positions 2, 3 and 4 in pot 3, and the remaining teams were placed in pot 4 in order.

South Sudan forfeited their qualifying match due to the high number of COVID-19 cases among the South Sudan delegation. The Algerian FA decided in July 2020 to send the Algeria A' (local) team, however, their final squad included players from other Arab leagues to strengthen the team. The Moroccan FA also decided to send the Morocco A' (local) team, however, they also later strengthened the team with players from other Arab leagues. Saudi Arabia participated with the Olympic team.

Note: Numbers in parentheses indicate positions in the FIFA World Ranking at the time of the draw.

From the April 2021 FIFA World Ranking
Directly to the group stage (Ranked 1st to 9th)	Competing in the qualifiers (Ranked 10th to 23rd)
1. Qatar (58) (hosts); 2. Tunisia (26); 3. Algeria (33); 4. Morocco (34); 5. Egypt (46); 6. Saudi Arabia (65); 7. Iraq (68); 8. United Arab Emirates (73); 9. Syria (79)	10. Oman (80); 11. Lebanon (93); 12. Jordan (95); 13. Bahrain (99); 14. Mauritania (101); 15. Palestine (104); 16. Libya (116); 17. Sudan (124); 18. Comoros (132); 19. Yemen (145); 20. Kuwait (148); 21. South Sudan (167); 22. Djibouti (192); 23. Somalia (195)

== Draw ==
The group stage draw took place on 27 April 2021 at 21:00 AST at the Katara Opera House in Doha. It was conducted by Manolo Zubiria, FIFA's director of competitions, and four former players: Wael Gomaa (Egypt), Nawaf Al-Temyat (Saudi Arabia), Haitham Mustafa (Sudan) and Younis Mahmoud (Iraq).

=== Method ===
The sixteen teams were drawn into four groups of four teams. The draw started with pot 1 and completed with pot 4, from where a team was drawn and assigned to the first available group in the position of their pot (i.e. position 1 for pot 1).

The hosts Qatar were automatically seeded into pot 1 and assigned to position A1, while the remaining automatically qualified teams were seeded into their respective pots based on the FIFA World Ranking of April 2021 (shown in parentheses below). Syria, the lowest-ranked team that automatically qualified, were joined in pot 3 by the winners of qualification matches 1 to 3, while pot 4 contained the winners of qualification matches 4 to 7. Algeria, as the winners of the 2019 Africa Cup of Nations, were assigned to position D1.

Pot 1
Team	Rank
Qatar	58
Tunisia	26
Algeria	33
Morocco	34

Pot 2
Team	Rank
Egypt	46
Saudi Arabia	65
Iraq	68
United Arab Emirates	73

Pot 3
Team	Rank
Syria	79
Qualification winner 1 (Note: Oman won the encounter.)	—N/a
Qualification winner 2 (Note: Lebanon won the encounter.)	—N/a
Qualification winner 3 (Note: Jordan won the encounter.)	—N/a

Pot 4
Team	Rank
Qualification winner 4 (Note: Bahrain won the encounter.)	—N/a
Qualification winner 5 (Note: Mauritania won the encounter.)	—N/a
Qualification winner 6 (Note: Palestine won the encounter.)	—N/a
Qualification winner 7 (Note: Sudan won the encounter.)	—N/a

== Squads ==
Only 15 players playing in non-Arab leagues were selected in the final 23-man squads: four in Sweden; two in England; one each in Denmark, Greece, Indonesia, Malaysia, Netherlands, Romania, Russia, Thailand and the United States.

== Match officials ==
In October 2021, FIFA nominated 12 referees and 24 assistant referees from all six confederations, three from South America, two from Asia, Africa, North America and Europe, and one referee from Oceania. With the exception of Andrés Mattonte (Uruguay) and Facundo Tello (Argentina), all referees had previously officiated matches in a continental tournament. Iranian Alireza Faghani, Japanese Ryuji Sato, Gambian Bakary Gassama, Zambian Janny Sikazwe and New Zealander Matthew Conger also participated in the 2018 FIFA World Cup in Russia.

Candidate referees were used at least twice. Iranian referee Alireza Faghani officiated the opening match between Tunisia and Mauritania. Germany's Daniel Siebert was responsible for the final match between Tunisia and Algeria, and he is the most refereed referee for matches in the tournament with four matches.

Confederation	Referee	Assistant referees	Video assistant referees
AFC	Alireza Faghani (Iran)	Mohammadreza Mansouri (Iran); Mohammadreza Abolfazli (Iran)	Shaun Evans (Australia); Abdulla Al Marri (Qatar); Hiroyuki Kimura (Japan)
AFC	Ryuji Sato (Japan)	Hiroshi Yamauchi (Japan); Jun Mihara (Japan)	Shaun Evans (Australia); Abdulla Al Marri (Qatar); Hiroyuki Kimura (Japan)
CAF	Bakary Gassama (Gambia)	Djibril Camara (Senegal); Elvis Noupue (Cameroon)	Rédouane Jiyed (Morocco); Ibrahim Nour El Din (Egypt)
CAF	Janny Sikazwe (Zambia)	Zakhele Siwela (South Africa); Jerson dos Santos (Angola)	Rédouane Jiyed (Morocco); Ibrahim Nour El Din (Egypt)
CONCACAF	Said Martínez (Honduras)	Walter López (Honduras); Christian Ramirez (Honduras)	Adonai Escobedo (Mexico); Fernando Guerrero (Mexico); Jair Marrufo (United States)
CONCACAF	Fernando Hernández Gómez (Mexico)	Micheal Barwegen (Canada); Karen Diaz Medina (Mexico)	Adonai Escobedo (Mexico); Fernando Guerrero (Mexico); Jair Marrufo (United States)
CONMEBOL	Andrés Matonte (Uruguay)	Martin Soppi (Uruguay); Carlos Barreiro (Uruguay)	Eber Aquino (Paraguay); Leodán González (Uruguay); Rafael Traci (Brazil); Juan Soto (Venezuela)
CONMEBOL	Wilton Sampaio (Brazil)	Danilo Manis (Brazil); Bruno Pires (Brazil)	Eber Aquino (Paraguay); Leodán González (Uruguay); Rafael Traci (Brazil); Juan Soto (Venezuela)
CONMEBOL	Facundo Tello (Argentina)	Ezequiel Brailovsky (Argentina); Gabriel Chade (Argentina)	Eber Aquino (Paraguay); Leodán González (Uruguay); Rafael Traci (Brazil); Juan Soto (Venezuela)
OFC	Matthew Conger (New Zealand)	Tevita Makasini (Tonga); Bernard Mutukera (Solomon Islands)	
UEFA	Szymon Marciniak (Poland)	Paweł Sokolnicki (Poland); Tomasz Listkiewicz (Poland)	Tomasz Kwiatkowski (Poland); Guillermo Cuadra Fernández (Spain); Christian Dingert (Germany); Fabio Maresca (Italy)
UEFA	Daniel Siebert (Germany)	Rafael Foltyn (Germany); Christian Gittelmann (Germany)	Tomasz Kwiatkowski (Poland); Guillermo Cuadra Fernández (Spain); Christian Dingert (Germany); Fabio Maresca (Italy)

== Venues ==
Al Khor	Al Rayyan (Doha Area)		Location of the host cities of the 2021 FIFA Arab Cup.
Al Bayt Stadium	Ahmad bin Ali Stadium	Education City Stadium	Location of the host cities of the 2021 FIFA Arab Cup.
Capacity: 68,895	Capacity: 45,032	Capacity: 44,667	Location of the host cities of the 2021 FIFA Arab Cup.
Doha		Al Wakrah	Stadiums of the 2021 FIFA Arab Cup in the Doha Area.
Al Thumama Stadium	Stadium 974	Al Janoub Stadium	Stadiums of the 2021 FIFA Arab Cup in the Doha Area.
Capacity: 44,400	Capacity: 44,089	Capacity: 44,325	Stadiums of the 2021 FIFA Arab Cup in the Doha Area.

== Qualification ==
The 14 lowest-ranked teams in the FIFA World Ranking met between 19 and 25 June 2021 in a single knockout match. The best-ranked team met the lowest ranked team, the second-best played the second-lowest, and so on.

The match between Jordan and their opponents South Sudan was canceled, due to cases of COVID-19 infection for eight South Sudanese players. FIFA awarded a 3–0 victory in favor of Jordan.

=== Summary ===
Team 1	Score	Team 2
Libya	0–1	Sudan
Oman	2–1	Somalia
Jordan	w/o	South Sudan
Mauritania	2–0	Yemen
Lebanon	1–0	Djibouti
Palestine	5–1	Comoros
Bahrain	2–0	Kuwait

=== Matches ===
All times are local, AST (UTC+3).

19 June 2021
20:00
Qualifying 7

Libya	0–1	Sudan
	Report	Abdel Rahman 15' (pen.)

Khalifa International Stadium, Al Rayyan
Attendance: 3,523
Referee: Saoud Ali Al-Adba (Qatar)

20 June 2021
20:00
Qualifying 1

Oman	2–1	Somalia
Al-Ghassani 12'; Al-Yahyaei 36' (pen.)	Report	Gigli 54'

Jassim bin Hamad Stadium, Al Rayyan
Attendance: 551
Referee: Benoît Bastien (France)

21 June 2021
20:00
Qualifying 3

Jordan	Cancelled (Note: The third qualification match was awarded as walkover to Jordan due to a forfeit from South Sudan as multiple players and staff had positive COVID-19 test results upon their arrival in Qatar.)	South Sudan
	Report

Khalifa International Stadium, Al Rayyan
Referee: Daniele Doveri (Italy)

22 June 2021
20:00
Qualifying 5

Mauritania	2–0	Yemen
Diakhité 18'; Tanjy 85'	Report

Jassim bin Hamad Stadium, Al Rayyan
Attendance: 187
Referee: Maurizio Mariani (Italy)

23 June 2021
20:00
Qualifying 2

Lebanon	1–0	Djibouti
El-Helwe 46'	Report

Khalifa International Stadium, Al Rayyan
Attendance: 739
Referee: Benoît Bastien (France)

24 June 2021
20:00
Qualifying 6

Palestine	5–1	Comoros
Kharoub 35'; Dabbagh 42'; Seyam 55', 71'; Batran 81'	Report	Djoumoi 5'

Jassim bin Hamad Stadium, Al Rayyan
Attendance: 451
Referee: Daniele Doveri (Italy)

25 June 2021
20:00
Qualifying 4

Bahrain	2–0	Kuwait
Haram 74'; Isa 90+4'	Report

Khalifa International Stadium, Al Rayyan
Attendance: 354
Referee: Mustapha Ghorbal (Algeria)

== Format ==
Of the 23 participating teams, the top nine teams based on the April 2021 FIFA World Ranking qualified directly to the group stage, while the remaining 14 teams played seven qualifying matches, of which seven qualified for the next stage. In the group stage, the teams were divided into four groups of four, with the two best teams from each group advancing to the quarter-finals.

=== Tiebreakers ===
The ranking of teams in the group stage is determined as follows:

1. Points obtained in all group matches (three points for a win, one for a draw, none for a defeat);
2. Goal difference in all group matches;
3. Number of goals scored in all group matches;
4. Points obtained in the matches played between the teams in question;
5. Goal difference in the matches played between the teams in question;
6. Number of goals scored in the matches played between the teams in question;
7. Fair play points in all group matches (only one deduction could be applied to a player in a single match):
  - Yellow card: −1 point;
  - Indirect red card (second yellow card): −3 points;
  - Direct red card: −4 points;
  - Yellow card and direct red card: −5 points;
8. Drawing of lots.

The knockout stage included all stages from the quarter-finals to the final match. The winner of each match advances to the next stage and the loser is eliminated. The losing teams of the semi-finals played the match for third place. In the final match, the winner got the Arab Cup. In all final cases, if the match ends in a tie, then extra time will be played. If the score is still equal after extra time, it is decided by a penalty shoot-out.

=== Schedule ===
All times are local, AST (UTC+3).

Match	Dates
Group stage
Matchday 1	30 November – 1 December 2021
Matchday 2	3–4 December 2021
Matchday 3	6–7 December 2021
Knockout stage
Quarter-finals	10 December – 11 December 2021
Semi-finals	15 December 2021
Third place play-off	18 December 2021
Final	18 December 2021

== Group stage ==
=== Group A ===
Pos	Team	Pld	W	D	L	GF	GA	GD	Pts	Qualification
1	Qatar (H)	3	3	0	0	6	1	+5	9	Advance to knockout stage
2	Oman	3	1	1	1	5	3	+2	4	Advance to knockout stage
3	Iraq	3	0	2	1	1	4	−3	2	
4	Bahrain	3	0	1	2	0	4	−4	1	

Source: FIFA
(H) Hosts
30 November 2021
16:00

Iraq	1–1	Oman
Abdulkareem 90+8' (pen.)	Report	Al-Yahyaei 78' (pen.)

Al Janoub Stadium, Al Wakrah
Attendance: 1,576
Referee: Said Martínez (Honduras)
30 November 2021
19:30

Qatar	1–0	Bahrain
Hatem 69'	Report

Al Bayt Stadium, Al Khor
Attendance: 47,813
Referee: Szymon Marciniak (Poland)

3 December 2021
13:00

Bahrain	0–0	Iraq
	Report

Al Thumama Stadium, Doha
Attendance: 2,576
Referee: Janny Sikazwe (Zambia)
3 December 2021
16:00

Oman	1–2	Qatar
Al-Hajri 74'	Report	Afif 32' (pen.); Durbin 90+7' (o.g.)

Education City Stadium, Al Rayyan
Attendance: 23,254
Referee: Wilton Sampaio (Brazil)

6 December 2021
22:00

Oman	3–0	Bahrain
R. Al-Alawi 41'; A. Al-Alawi 50'; Al-Hajri 59'	Report

Ahmad bin Ali Stadium, Al Rayyan
Attendance: 2,477
Referee: Ryuji Sato (Japan)
6 December 2021
22:00

Qatar	3–0	Iraq
Ali 82'; Afif 84'; Al-Haydos 90+4'	Report

Al Bayt Stadium, Al Khor
Attendance: 23,008
Referee: Bakary Gassama (Gambia)

=== Group B ===
Pos	Team	Pld	W	D	L	GF	GA	GD	Pts	Qualification
1	Tunisia	3	2	0	1	6	3	+3	6	Advance to knockout stage
2	United Arab Emirates	3	2	0	1	3	2	+1	6	Advance to knockout stage
3	Syria	3	1	0	2	4	4	0	3	
4	Mauritania	3	1	0	2	3	7	−4	3	

Source: FIFA
30 November 2021
13:00

Tunisia	5–1	Mauritania
Jaziri 39', 45+2'; Ben Larbi 42', 51'; Msakni 90+1'	Report	Bessam 45+12' (pen.)

Ahmad bin Ali Stadium, Al Rayyan
Attendance: 2,494
Referee: Alireza Faghani (Iran)
30 November 2021
22:00

United Arab Emirates	2–1	Syria
Caio 24'; Saleh 30'	Report	Al Salama 60'

Stadium 974, Doha
Attendance: 4,129
Referee: Janny Sikazwe (Zambia)

3 December 2021
19:00

Mauritania	0–1	United Arab Emirates
	Report	Ibrahim 90+3'

Stadium 974, Doha
Attendance: 3,316
Referee: Andrés Matonte (Uruguay)
3 December 2021
22:00

Syria	2–0	Tunisia
Kass Kawo 4'; Anez 47'	Report

Al Bayt Stadium, Al Khor
Attendance: 15,913
Referee: Fernando Hernández Gómez (Mexico)

6 December 2021
18:00

Syria	1–2	Mauritania
Al Baher 52'	Report	Soueid 50'; Tanjy 90+5'

Al Janoub Stadium, Al Wakrah
Attendance: 8,539
Referee: Wilton Sampaio (Brazil)
6 December 2021
18:00

Tunisia	1–0	United Arab Emirates
Jaziri 10'	Report

Al Thumama Stadium, Doha
Attendance: 14,272
Referee: Daniel Siebert (Germany)

=== Group C ===
Pos	Team	Pld	W	D	L	GF	GA	GD	Pts	Qualification
1	Morocco	3	3	0	0	9	0	+9	9	Advance to knockout stage
2	Jordan	3	2	0	1	6	5	+1	6	Advance to knockout stage
3	Saudi Arabia	3	0	1	2	1	3	−2	1	
4	Palestine	3	0	1	2	2	10	−8	1	

Source: FIFA
1 December 2021
19:00

Morocco	4–0	Palestine
Nahiri 31'; Hafidi 56', 64'; Benoun 87' (pen.)	Report

Al Janoub Stadium, Al Wakrah
Attendance: 3,843
Referee: Matthew Conger (New Zealand)
1 December 2021
22:00

Saudi Arabia	0–1	Jordan
	Report	Mardi 62'

Education City Stadium, Al Rayyan
Attendance: 4,777
Referee: Bakary Gassama (Gambia)

4 December 2021
13:00

Jordan	0–4	Morocco
	Report	Jabrane 4'; Benoun 25'; Chibi 45+3'; Rahimi 88' (pen.)

Ahmad bin Ali Stadium, Al Rayyan
Attendance: 7,890
Referee: Facundo Tello (Argentina)
4 December 2021
22:00

Palestine	1–1	Saudi Arabia
Rashid 45+2'	Report	Al-Hamdan 81'

Education City Stadium, Al Rayyan
Attendance: 3,075
Referee: Said Martínez (Honduras)

7 December 2021
18:00

Morocco	1–0	Saudi Arabia
El Berkaoui 45+4' (pen.)	Report

Al Thumama Stadium, Doha
Attendance: 8,502
Referee: Andrés Matonte (Uruguay)
7 December 2021
18:00

Jordan	5–1	Palestine
Abdel-Rahman 9' (pen.); Al-Dardour 24'; Al-Mardi 82'; Al-Naimat 86', 90+1'	Report	Seyam 44'

Stadium 974, Doha
Attendance: 9,750
Referee: Alireza Faghani (Iran)

=== Group D ===
Pos	Team	Pld	W	D	L	GF	GA	GD	Pts	Qualification
1	Egypt	3	2	1	0	7	1	+6	7 (Note: Fair-play points: Egypt –6, Algeria –11.)	Advance to knockout stage
2	Algeria	3	2	1	0	7	1	+6	7	Advance to knockout stage
3	Lebanon	3	1	0	2	1	3	−2	3	
4	Sudan	3	0	0	3	0	10	−10	0	

Source: FIFA
Notes:
1 December 2021
13:00

Algeria	4–0	Sudan
Bounedjah 11', 37'; Benlamri 43'; Soudani 46'	Report

Ahmad bin Ali Stadium, Al Rayyan
Attendance: 2,203
Referee: Ryuji Sato (Japan)
1 December 2021
16:00

Egypt	1–0	Lebanon
Afsha 71' (pen.)	Report

Al Thumama Stadium, Doha
Attendance: 11,757
Referee: Daniel Siebert (Germany)

4 December 2021
16:00

Lebanon	0–2	Algeria
	Report	Brahimi 69' (pen.); Meziani 90+3'

Al Janoub Stadium, Al Wakrah
Attendance: 9,405
Referee: Szymon Marciniak (Poland)
4 December 2021
19:00

Sudan	0–5	Egypt
	Report	Refaat 4'; Zizo 13' (pen.); El Wensh 31'; H. Faisal 57'; Sherif 80'

Stadium 974, Doha
Attendance: 14,464
Referee: Matthew Conger (New Zealand)

7 December 2021
22:00

Algeria	1–1	Egypt
Tougai 20'	Report	El Solia 60' (pen.)

Al Janoub Stadium, Al Wakrah
Attendance: 32,418
Referee: Facundo Tello (Argentina)
7 December 2021
22:00

Lebanon	1–0	Sudan
Abu Eshrein 76' (o.g.)	Report

Education City Stadium, Al Rayyan
Attendance: 5,991
Referee: Fernando Hernández Gómez (Mexico)

== Knockout stage ==
The knockout stage was the second and final stage of the tournament, after the group stage. It started on 10 December with the quarter-finals and ended on 18 December following the final match that was held at Al Bayt Stadium in Al Khor. The best two teams from each group (8 in total) advanced to the knockout stage to compete in a singles-elimination tournament. A match for third place was played between the two losing teams in the semi-finals.

If the match was tied at the end of the original playing time, two halves of extra time was played (15 minutes each) and followed, if necessary, by a penalty shoot-out to determine the winners. Below is an arc for the knockout stage of the tournament. Teams in bold indicate the winners of the match.

=== Bracket ===
Quarter-finals
10 December – Al Rayyan (ECS)
**Tunisia**	**2**
Oman	1
11 December – Al Wakrah
**Egypt (a.e.t.)**	**3**
Jordan	1
10 December – Al Khor
**Qatar**	**5**
United Arab Emirates	0
11 December – Doha (ATS)
Morocco	2 (3)
**Algeria (p)**	**2 (5)**

Semi-finals
15 December – Doha (S974)
**Tunisia**	**1**
Egypt	0
15 December – Doha (ATS)
Qatar	1
**Algeria**	**2**

Final
18 December – Al Khor
Tunisia	0
**Algeria (a.e.t.)**	**2**
Third place play-off
18 December – Doha (S974)
Egypt	0 (4)
**Qatar (p)**	**0 (5)**

=== Quarter-finals ===
10 December 2021
18:00

Tunisia	2–1	Oman
Jaziri 16'; Msakni 69'	Report	A. Al-Alawi 66'

Education City Stadium, Al Rayyan
Attendance: 21,329
Referee: Daniel Siebert (Germany)

10 December 2021
22:00

Qatar	5–0	United Arab Emirates
Salmeen 6' (o.g.); Ali 28' (pen.), 45+3'; Khoukhi 36' (pen.); Hatem 44'	Report

Al Bayt Stadium, Al Khor
Attendance: 63,439
Referee: Andrés Matonte (Uruguay)

11 December 2021
18:00

Egypt	3–1 (a.e.t.)	Jordan
Mar. Hamdy 45+1'; Refaat 100'; Dawoud 119'	Report	Al-Naimat 12'

Al Janoub Stadium, Al Wakrah
Attendance: 28,306
Referee: Said Martínez (Honduras)

11 December 2021
22:00

Morocco	2–2 (a.e.t.)	Algeria
Nahiri 64'; Benoun 111'	Report	Brahimi 62' (pen.); Belaïli 102'
Penalties
Rahimi (penalty scored); Benoun (penalty scored); Jabrane (penalty scored); El Berkaoui (penalty missed)	3–5	(penalty scored) Belaïli; (penalty scored) Bendebka; (penalty scored) Bedrane; (penalty scored) Benayada; (penalty scored) Tougai

Al Thumama Stadium, Doha
Attendance: 24,823
Referee: Wilton Sampaio (Brazil)

=== Semi-finals ===
15 December 2021
18:00

Tunisia	1–0	Egypt
El Solia 90+5' (o.g.)	Report

Stadium 974, Doha
Attendance: 36,427
Referee: Alireza Faghani (Iran)

15 December 2021
22:00

Qatar	1–2	Algeria
Muntari 90+7'	Report	Benlamri 59'; Belaïli 90+17'

Al Thumama Stadium, Doha
Attendance: 42,405
Referee: Szymon Marciniak (Poland)

=== Third place play-off ===
18 December 2021
13:00

Egypt	0–0 (a.e.t.)	Qatar
	Report
Penalties
Afsha (penalty scored); El Solia (penalty scored); Hegazi (penalty missed); Fatouh (penalty scored); Tawfik (penalty scored); Sherif (penalty missed)	4–5	(penalty missed) Al-Haydos; (penalty scored) Khoukhi; (penalty scored) Hassan; (penalty scored) Alaaeldin; (penalty scored) Afif; (penalty scored) Boudiaf

Stadium 974, Doha
Attendance: 30,978
Referee: Facundo Tello (Argentina)

=== Final ===
18 December 2021
18:00

Tunisia	0–2 (a.e.t.)	Algeria
	Report	Sayoud 99'; Brahimi 120+5'

Al Bayt Stadium, Al Khor
Attendance: 60,456
Referee: Daniel Siebert (Germany)

== Statistics ==
=== Goalscorers ===
There were 83 goals scored in 32 matches, for an average of 2.59 goals per match.

4 goals

- (Tunisia) Seifeddine Jaziri

3 goals

- (Algeria) Yacine Brahimi
- (Jordan) Yazan Al-Naimat
- (Morocco) Badr Benoun
- (Qatar) Almoez Ali

2 goals

- (Algeria) Youcef Belaïli
- (Algeria) Djamel Benlamri
- (Algeria) Baghdad Bounedjah
- (Egypt) Ahmed Refaat
- (Morocco) Abdelilah Hafidi
- (Morocco) Mohamed Nahiri
- (Oman) Arshad Al-Alawi
- (Oman) Khalid Al-Hajri
- (Qatar) Akram Afif
- (Qatar) Abdulaziz Hatem
- (Tunisia) Firas Ben Larbi
- (Tunisia) Youssef Msakni

1 goal

- (Algeria) Tayeb Meziani
- (Algeria) Amir Sayoud
- (Algeria) Hillal Soudani
- (Algeria) Mohamed Amine Tougai
- (Egypt) Marwan Dawoud
- (Egypt) Amr El Solia
- (Egypt) Hussein Faisal
- (Egypt) Mahmoud "El Wensh" Hamdy
- (Egypt) Marwan Hamdy
- (Egypt) Mohamed "Afsha" Magdy
- (Egypt) Ahmed "Zizo" Sayed
- (Egypt) Mohamed Sherif
- (Iraq) Hasan Abdulkareem
- (Jordan) Baha' Abdel-Rahman
- (Jordan) Hamza Al-Dardour
- (Jordan) Mahmoud Al-Mardi
- (Saudi Arabia) Abdullah Al-Hamdan
- (Mauritania) Bessam
- (Mauritania) Mouhamed Soueid
- (Mauritania) Hemeya Tanjy
- (Morocco) Karim El Berkaoui
- (Morocco) Mohamed Chibi
- (Morocco) Yahya Jabrane
- (Morocco) Soufiane Rahimi
- (Oman) Rabia Al-Alawi
- (Oman) Salaah Al-Yahyaei
- (Palestine) Mohammed Rashid
- (Palestine) Tamer Seyam
- (Qatar) Hassan Al-Haydos
- (Qatar) Boualem Khoukhi
- (Qatar) Mohammed Muntari
- (Syria) Mouhamad Anez
- (Syria) Mahmoud Al Baher
- (Syria) Oliver Kass Kawo
- (Syria) Ward Alslamh
- (United Arab Emirates) Caio Canedo
- (United Arab Emirates) Khalil Ibrahim
- (United Arab Emirates) Ali Saleh

1 own goal

- (Egypt) Amr El Solia (against Tunisia)
- (Saudi Arabia) Khalifah Al-Dawsari (against Jordan)
- (Oman) Fahmi Durbin (against Qatar)
- (Sudan) Ali Abu Eshrein (against Lebanon)
- (United Arab Emirates) Ali Salmeen (against Qatar)

Source: FIFA

=== Awards ===
The following awards were given at the conclusion of the tournament.

Golden Ball	Silver Ball	Bronze Ball
(Algeria) Yacine Brahimi	(Algeria) Youcef Belaïli	(Qatar) Akram Afif
Golden Boot	Silver Boot	Bronze Boot
(Tunisia) Seifeddine Jaziri 4 goals, 0 assists 511 minutes played	(Algeria) Yacine Brahimi 3 goals, 1 assist 507 minutes played	(Jordan) Yazan Al-Naimat 3 goals, 0 assists 166 minutes played
Golden Glove
(Algeria) Raïs M'Bolhi
FIFA Fair Play Award
Morocco

=== Team of the Tournament ===
The Team of the Tournament was as follows:

Goalkeeper	Defenders	Midfielders	Forwards
(Algeria) Raïs M'Bolhi	(Egypt) Ahmed Fatouh (Algeria) Djamel Benlamri (Morocco) Badr Benoun (Morocco) Mohamed Chibi	(Tunisia) Youssef Msakni (Qatar) Abdulaziz Hatem (Algeria) Yacine Brahimi	(Algeria) Youcef Belaïli (Tunisia) Seifeddine Jaziri (Qatar) Akram Afif

== Final ranking ==
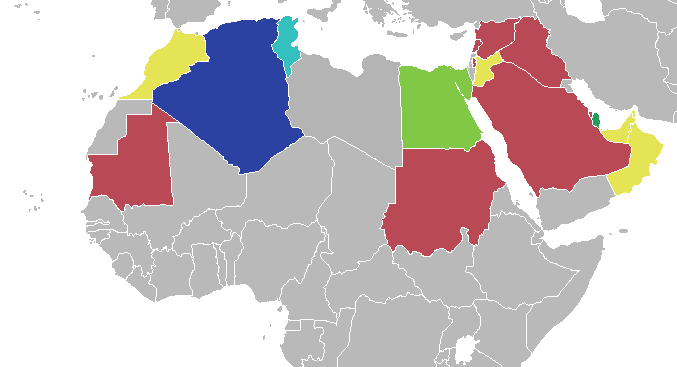
Champion Runner-up Third place Fourth place Quarter-finals Group stage

The final ranking of the tournament is reported below.

R	Team	Grp	Pld	W	D	L	GF	GA	GD	Pts.
1	Algeria	D	6	4	2	0	13	4	+9	14
2	Tunisia	B	6	4	0	2	9	6	+3	12
3	Qatar	A	6	4	1	1	12	3	+9	13
4	Egypt	D	6	3	2	1	10	3	+7	11
Eliminated in the quarter-finals
5	Morocco	C	4	3	1	0	11	2	+9	10
6	Jordan	C	4	2	0	2	7	8	−1	6
7	United Arab Emirates	B	4	2	0	2	3	7	−4	6
8	Oman	A	4	1	1	2	6	5	+1	4
Eliminated in the group stage
9	Syria	B	3	1	0	2	4	4	0	3
10	Lebanon	D	3	1	0	2	1	3	−2	3
11	Mauritania	B	3	1	0	2	3	7	−4	3
12	Iraq	A	3	0	2	1	1	4	−3	2
13	Saudi Arabia	C	3	0	1	2	1	3	−2	1
14	Bahrain	A	3	0	1	2	0	4	−4	1
15	Palestine	C	3	0	1	2	2	10	−8	1
16	Sudan	D	3	0	0	3	0	10	−10	0

As per statistical convention in football, matches decided in extra time are counted as wins and losses, while matches decided by penalty shoot-outs are counted as draws.

== Broadcasting rights ==
Country/Region	Broadcaster	Ref.
Australia	Special Broadcasting Service	
Indonesia	MNC Vision, K-Vision	
Malaysia	Astro SuperSport	
Qatar	beIN Sports	
Qatar	Alkass	
South Korea	SBS Sports	
United States	Fox Sports; Telemundo Deportes (final match only)	
World	FIFATV (YouTube)	

== Sponsorship ==
FIFA partners	FIFA Arab Cup sponsors	Regional supporters
Adidas; Coca-Cola; Hyundai–Kia; Qatar Airways; Visa; Wanda Group; QatarEnergy	McDonald's; Vivo; Budweiser	Ooredoo; QNB Group; Winwin

== See also ==
- 2021 Arab Women's Cup
