= Tunisia at the FIFA Arab Cup =

Participation in football competition

Tunisia has participated three times in the FIFA Arab Cup, the biggest men's football event in the Arab world. Tunisia was one of five teams participating in the first edition of the Arab Nations Cup, held in Beirut, Lebanon, in 1963. At the time, the tournament was official. Under the leadership of French coach André Gérard, Tunisia won the title, finishing first in the group after winning all four of its matches and collecting eight points against Syria 1–0, Jordan 4–0, Kuwait 5–1, and Lebanon 1–0. Mongi Haddad was the tournament's top scorer with four goals. Tunisia missed the next three editions and did not return until 1988. Under the leadership of Mokhtar Tlili, the team was forced to play two qualifying matches, drawing 0–0 against Algeria and winning 2–1 against Mauritania. During the finals, the team's performances did not live up to expectations, and they were eliminated in the first round after three draws against Iraq 1–1, Saudi Arabia 1–1, and Lebanon 1–1, as well as a 0–1 defeat against Egypt.

On 25 July 2020, FIFA invited Tunisia to participate in the 2021 FIFA Arab Cup in Qatar, the first edition under the auspices of FIFA with the participation of sixteen teams in the final tournament. Tunisia advanced directly to the finals without qualifying, thanks to its first place in the Arab world in the FIFA world rankings. The team finished first in its group after two wins against Mauritania 5–1 and the United Arab Emirates 1–0, as well as a surprise defeat against Syria 0–2. In the quarter-finals, the team defeated Oman 2–1 and, in the semifinals, Egypt 1–0 thanks to a goal in the 90+5 minute. However, Tunisia lost the final to Algeria 0–2 after extra time. Seifeddine Jaziri was the tournament's top scorer with four.

On 26 April 2025, FIFA invited Tunisia to participate in the 2025 FIFA Arab Cup in Qatar. Tunisia advanced directly to the finals without qualifying, thanks to its fourth place in the Arab world in the FIFA world rankings. Their performance fell short of expectations, as the team was eliminated in the group stage after a 1–0 defeat against Syria, a 2–2 draw against Palestine, and a 3–0 victory against Qatar.

== Overall record ==
FIFA Arab Cup record										FIFA Arab Cup qualification record						
Year	Round	Position	Pld	W	D*	L	GF	GA	Squad	Pld	W	D	L	GF	GA	Ref.
(Lebanon) 1963	Champions	1st	4	4	0	0	11	1	Squad	Qualified automatically						
(Kuwait) 1964	Did not enter									Did not enter						
(Iraq) 1966	Did not enter									Did not enter						
(Saudi Arabia) 1985	Did not enter									Did not enter						
(Jordan) 1988	Group stage	7th	4	0	3	1	3	4	Squad	2	1	1	0	2	1	
(Syria) 1992	Did not enter									Did not enter						
(Qatar) 1998	Did not enter									Did not enter						
(Kuwait) 2002	Did not enter									Did not enter						
(Saudi Arabia) 2012	Did not enter									Did not enter						
(Qatar) 2021	Runners-up	2nd	6	4	0	2	9	6	Squad	Qualified automatically						
(Qatar) 2025	Group stage	9th	3	1	1	1	5	3	Squad	Qualified automatically						
Total	Champions	4/11	17	9	4	4	28	14	—	2	1	1	0	2	1	—

== Matches ==
Win Draw Loss

Part	Year	No.	Stage	Date	Opponent	Result	Tunisia scorers	Ref
1	(Lebanon) 1963	1	Final tournament	2 April 1963	Syria	1–0	Ben Amor 20'	
1	(Lebanon) 1963	2	Final tournament	4 April 1963	Jordan	4–0	Haddad 1', 6' Jedidi 26' Henia 34'	
1	(Lebanon) 1963	3	Final tournament	6 April 1963	Kuwait	5–1	Habacha 9' Jedidi 21', 54' Henia 73' Haddad 78'	
1	(Lebanon) 1963	4	Final tournament	7 April 1963	Lebanon	1–0	Haddad 10'	
2	(Jordan) 1988	5	Group stage	9 July 1988	Iraq	1–1	Mahjoubi 62'	
2	(Jordan) 1988	6	Group stage	11 July 1988	Saudi Arabia Ol.	1–1	Maaloul 90' (pen.)	
2	(Jordan) 1988	7	Group stage	13 July 1988	Egypt	0–1	—	
2	(Jordan) 1988	8	Group stage	17 July 1988	Lebanon	1–1	Mehedhebi 46'	
3	(Qatar) 2021	9	Group stage	30 November 2021	Mauritania	5–1	Jaziri 39', 45+2' Ben Larbi 42', 51' Msakni 90+1'	
3	(Qatar) 2021	10	Group stage	3 December 2021	Syria	0–2	—	
3	(Qatar) 2021	11	Group stage	6 December 2021	United Arab Emirates	1–0	Jaziri 10'	
3	(Qatar) 2021	12	Quarter-finals	10 December 2021	Oman	2–1	Jaziri 16' Msakni 69'	
3	(Qatar) 2021	13	Semi-finals	15 December 2021	Egypt	1–0	El Solia 90+5' (o.g.)	
3	(Qatar) 2021	14	Final	18 December 2021	Algeria	0–2 (a.e.t.)	—	
	(Qatar) 2025	15	Group stage	1 December 2025	Syria	0–1	—	
	(Qatar) 2025	16	Group stage	4 December 2025	Palestine	2–2	Layouni 16' Chaouat 51'	
	(Qatar) 2025	17	Group stage	7 December 2025	Qatar	3–0	Ben Romdhane 16' Meriah 62' Ben Ali 90+4'	

== Tournaments ==
=== 1963 Arab Cup ===
In early 1963, the Tunisian Football Federation appointed French coach André Gérard to lead the team in the inaugural edition of the Arab Cup, held in Beirut, Lebanon. The team won the title by winning all of its matches, defeating Syria 1–0, Jordan 4–0, Kuwait 5–1, and Lebanon 1–0. Tunisia won its first title since independence, and Mongi Haddad finished the tournament as the top scorer with four goals.

==== Final tournament ====
Pos	Team	Pld	W	D	L	GF	GA	GD	Pts	Qualification
1	Tunisia	4	4	0	0	11	1	+10	8	Champions
2	Syria	4	3	0	1	11	3	+8	6	
3	Lebanon	4	2	0	2	13	4	+9	4	
4	Kuwait	4	1	0	3	5	15	−10	2	
5	Jordan	4	0	0	4	0	17	−17	0	

Source: Rsssf
2 April 1963

Tunisia	1–0	Syria
Ben Amor 20'

Camille Chamoun Stadium, Beirut
Attendance: 7,000
Referee: Muvahhit Afir (Turkey)

4 April 1963

Tunisia	4–0	Jordan
Haddad 1', 6'; Jedidi 26'; Henia 34'

Camille Chamoun Stadium, Beirut
Attendance: 10,000
Referee: Atef Sinane (Lebanon)

6 April 1963

Tunisia	5–1	Kuwait
Habacha 9'; Jedidi 21', 54'; Henia 73'; Haddad 78'		Ad-Doula 85'

Camille Chamoun Stadium, Beirut
Attendance: 5,000
Referee: Khatchadour Boyadjian (Lebanon)

7 April 1963

Lebanon	0–1	Tunisia
		Haddad 10'

Camille Chamoun Stadium, Beirut
Attendance: 20,000
Referee: Muvahhit Afir (Turkey)

=== 1988 Arab Cup ===
==== Group stage ====
Pos	Team	Pld	W	D	L	GF	GA	GD	Pts	Qualification
1	Egypt	4	2	2	0	4	0	+4	6	Advance to knockout stage
2	Iraq	4	1	3	0	3	1	+2	5	Advance to knockout stage
3	Lebanon	4	1	2	1	2	4	−2	4	
4	Tunisia	4	0	3	1	3	4	−1	3	
5	Saudi Arabia Ol.	4	0	2	2	1	4	−3	2	

Source: Rsssf
9 July 1988

Iraq	1–1	Tunisia
Radhi 32'		Mahjoubi 62'

Amman International Stadium, Amman
Attendance: 17,000
Referee: Issa Al-Jassas (Kuwait)

11 July 1988

Saudi Arabia Ol.	1–1	Tunisia
Farhan 80'		Maaloul 90' (pen.)

Amman International Stadium, Amman
Attendance: 8,000

13 July 1988

Egypt	1–0	Tunisia
Soliman 62'

Amman International Stadium, Amman
Attendance: 18,000
Referee: Mohamed Hansal (Algeria)

17 July 1988

Lebanon	1–1	Tunisia
Hammoud 65'		Mehedhebi 46'

Amman International Stadium, Amman
Attendance: 25,000

=== 2021 FIFA Arab Cup ===
After a nine-year hiatus, FIFA decided to organize the Arab Cup under its new name, the FIFA Arab Cup. On 25 July 2020, Tunisia was called up to participate in the 2021 FIFA Arab Cup. The team did not have to go through the qualifiers due to its first-place Arab team according to the FIFA World Ranking. The draw was held on 27 April 2021, and Tunisia was placed alongside the United Arab Emirates, Syria, and Mauritania, who qualified from the qualifiers.

Tunisia played their first group stage match against Mauritania and achieved a resounding 5–1 victory with two goals from Seifeddine Jaziri, two goals from Firas Ben Larbi and a goal from captain Youssef Msakni. The team suffered a shock defeat in the second match against underdogs Syria, 2–0, but they still advanced to the quarter-finals after defeating the United Arab Emirates 1–0 with a goal from Jaziri, placing Tunisia top of the group. In the quarterfinals, the team defeated Oman 2–1 thanks to goals from Jaziri and Msakni. In the semifinals, Tunisia clashed with rivals Egypt, but managed to score a goal in the 95th minute after a free kick from Naïm Sliti, which was deflected into the net by Egypt's Amr El Solia, and secured qualification by ending the match with a 1–0 score. This victory allowed Tunisia to reach its first FIFA final in the country's history. In the final match, the team faced Algeria, which they defeated 0–2 in extra time. Jaziri finished as the tournament's top scorer with four goals and won the FIFA Golden Boot award. Despite losing the title, the team's performance restored confidence among the fans, who attended the tournament in the tens of thousands, especially after the defeat against Syria and in the playoffs. In this context, they were congratulated by FIFA and named the best fans of the tournament.

==== Group stage ====
Pos	Team	Pld	W	D	L	GF	GA	GD	Pts	Qualification
1	Tunisia	3	2	0	1	6	3	+3	6	Advance to knockout stage
2	United Arab Emirates	3	2	0	1	3	2	+1	6	Advance to knockout stage
3	Syria	3	1	0	2	4	4	0	3	
4	Mauritania	3	1	0	2	3	7	−4	3	

Source: FIFA
30 November 2021
13:00

Tunisia	5–1	Mauritania
Jaziri 39', 45+2'; Ben Larbi 42', 51'; Msakni 90+1'	Report	Bessam 45+12' (pen.)

Ahmad bin Ali Stadium, Al Rayyan
Attendance: 2,494
Referee: Alireza Faghani (Iran)

3 December 2021
22:00

Syria	2–0	Tunisia
Kass Kawo 4'; Anez 47'	Report

Al Bayt Stadium, Al Khor
Attendance: 15,913
Referee: Fernando Hernández Gómez (Mexico)

6 December 2021
18:00

Tunisia	1–0	United Arab Emirates
Jaziri 10'	Report

Al Thumama Stadium, Doha
Attendance: 14,272
Referee: Daniel Siebert (Germany)

==== Quarter-finals ====
10 December 2021
18:00

Tunisia	2–1	Oman
Jaziri 16'; Msakni 69'	Report	A. Al-Alawi 66'

Education City Stadium, Al Rayyan
Attendance: 21,329
Referee: Daniel Siebert (Germany)

==== Semi-finals ====
15 December 2021
18:00

Tunisia	1–0	Egypt
El Solia 90+5' (o.g.)	Report

Stadium 974, Doha
Attendance: 36,427
Referee: Alireza Faghani (Iran)

==== Final ====
18 December 2021
18:00

Tunisia	0–2 (a.e.t.)	Algeria
	Report	Sayoud 99'; Brahimi 120+5'

Al Bayt Stadium, Al Khor
Attendance: 60,456
Referee: Daniel Siebert (Germany)

Tunisia	Algeria

GK	22	Mouez Hassen
RB	20	Mohamed Dräger
CB	2	Bilel Ifa
CB	3	Montassar Talbi
LB	14	Amine Ben Hamida	(yellow card) 43'	(substituted off) 101'
CM	6	Ghaylen Chaaleli
CM	13	Ferjani Sassi	(yellow card) 64'	(substituted off) 101'
RW	7	Youssef Msakni (c)	(yellow card) 39'
AM	10	Hannibal Mejbri		(substituted off) 88'
LW	23	Naïm Sliti		(substituted off) 110'
CF	11	Seifeddine Jaziri	(yellow card) 40'
Substitutions:
MF	15	Ali Ben Romdhane		(substituted on) 88'
DF	12	Ali Maâloul		(substituted on) 101'
MF	18	Saad Bguir		(substituted on) 101'
MF	9	Firas Ben Larbi		(substituted on) 110'
Manager:
Mondher Kebaier

GK	23	Raïs M'Bolhi (c)
RB	3	Houcine Benayada		(substituted off) 120+3'
CB	4	Djamel Benlamri
CB	19	Abdelkader Bedrane
LB	20	Ilyes Chetti	(yellow card) 13'
CM	18	Houssem Eddine Mrezigue		(substituted off) 91'
CM	14	Sofiane Bendebka	(yellow card) 90+3'	(substituted off) 118'
RW	7	Tayeb Meziani		(substituted off) 66'
AM	11	Yacine Brahimi	(yellow card) 120+4'
LW	10	Youcef Belaïli
CF	9	Baghdad Bounedjah	(yellow card) 40'
Substitutions:
MF	8	Amir Sayoud		(substituted on) 66'
MF	17	Zakaria Draoui		(substituted on) 91'
DF	5	Mehdi Tahrat		(substituted on) 118'
DF	12	Mohamed Amine Tougai		(substituted on) 120+3'
Manager:
Madjid Bougherra

Man of the Match:
Amir Sayoud (Algeria)

Assistant referees:
Rafael Foltyn (Germany)
Christian Gittelmann (Germany)
Fourth official:
Matthew Conger (New Zealand)
Reserve assistant referee:
Tevita Makasini (Tonga)
Video assistant referee:
Christian Dingert (Germany)
Assistant video assistant referees:
Kevin Blom (Netherlands)
Jun Mihara (Japan)
Shaun Evans (Australia)

Match rules

- 90 minutes
- 30 minutes of extra time if necessary
- Penalty shoot-out if scores still level
- Maximum of twelve named substitutes
- Maximum of five substitutions, with a sixth allowed in extra time

=== 2025 FIFA Arab Cup ===
On 26 April 2025, FIFA invited Tunisia to participate in the 2025 FIFA Arab Cup in Qatar. On 21 November, Sami Trabelsi unveiled the list of players selected for the FIFA Arab Cup, despite the absence of the biggest names playing in Europe, whose clubs had refused to release them. In the opening match, despite dominating the first half, the team suffered a 1–0 defeat against Syria. In the second match against Palestine, Tunisia opened the scoring through Amor Layouni in the 16th minute, followed by Firas Chaouat's second goal in the 51st minute. However, the team's performance subsequently declined, and Palestine managed to pull one back in the 61st minute before equalizing in the 85th minute, thus securing a 2–2 draw. In the third match, Tunisia defeated Qatar, the host country and 2023 AFC Asian Cup champions. Tunisia opened the scoring in the 16th minute through Mohamed Ali Ben Romdhane, Yassine Meriah doubled the lead in the 62nd minute, and Mohamed Ben Ali scored the third goal in the 94th minute, sealing a 3–0 victory. The draw between Syria and Palestine resulted in Tunisia's elimination from the group stage.

==== Group stage ====
Pos	Team	Pld	W	D	L	GF	GA	GD	Pts	Qualification
1	Palestine	3	1	2	0	3	2	+1	5	Advance to knockout stage
2	Syria	3	1	2	0	2	1	+1	5	Advance to knockout stage
3	Tunisia	3	1	1	1	5	3	+2	4	
4	Qatar (H)	3	0	1	2	1	5	−4	1	

Source: FIFA
Rules for classification: Tiebreakers
(H) Hosts
1 December 2025
16:00

Tunisia	0–1	Syria
	Report	Khribin 48'

Ahmad bin Ali Stadium, Al Rayyan
Attendance: 26,966
Referee: Juan Gabriel Calderón (Costa Rica)

4 December 2025
17:30

Palestine	2–2	Tunisia
Hamdan 61'; Qunbar 85'	Report	Layouni 16'; Chaouat 51'

Lusail Stadium, Lusail
Attendance: 44,548
Referee: Ismail Elfath (United States)

7 December 2025
20:00

Qatar	0–3	Tunisia
	Report	Ben Romdhane 16'; Meriah 62'; Ben Ali 90+4'

Al Bayt Stadium, Al Khor
Attendance: 48,151
Referee: Espen Eskås (Norway)

== Statistics ==
=== Head to head ===
- – Positive balance
- – Neutral balance
- – Negative balance

Versus	Pld	W	D	L	GF	GA	Def	First match date	Last match date
Algeria	1	0	0	1	0	2	–2	18 December 2021	18 December 2021
Egypt	2	1	0	1	1	1	0	13 July 1988	15 December 2021
Iraq	1	0	1	0	1	1	0	9 July 1988	9 July 1988
Jordan	1	1	0	0	4	0	+4	4 April 1963	4 April 1963
Kuwait	1	1	0	0	5	1	+4	6 April 1963	6 April 1963
Lebanon	2	1	1	0	2	1	+1	7 April 1963	17 July 1988
Mauritania	1	1	0	0	5	1	+4	30 November 2021	30 November 2021
Oman	1	1	0	0	2	1	+1	10 December 2021	10 December 2021
Palestine	1	0	1	0	2	2	0	4 December 2025	4 December 2025
Qatar	1	1	0	0	3	0	+3	7 December 2025	7 December 2025
Saudi Arabia	1	0	1	0	1	1	0	11 July 1988	11 July 1988
Syria	3	1	0	2	1	3	–2	2 April 1963	1 December 2025
United Arab Emirates	1	1	0	0	1	0	+1	6 December 2021	6 December 2021
	17	9	4	4	28	14	+14	2 April 1963	7 December 2025

=== Goalscorers ===
Rank	Player	1963	1988	2021	2025	Goals
1	Seifeddine Jaziri			4		4
1	Mongi Haddad	4				4
2	Mohamed Salah Jedidi	3				3
3	Firas Ben Larbi			2		2
3	Youssef Msakni			2		2
3	Hammadi Henia	2				2
4	Raouf Ben Amor	1				1
4	Mohsen Habacha	1				1
4	Mohamed Ali Mahjoubi		1			1
4	Nabil Maâloul		1			1
4	Taoufik Mehedhebi		1			1
4	Mohamed Ali Ben Romdhane				1	1
4	Yassine Meriah				1	1
4	Amor Layouni				1	1
4	Firas Chaouat				1	1
4	Mohamed Ben Ali				1	1
	(Egypt) Amr El Solia (o.g.)			1		1
Total		11	3	9	5	28

– Best goalscorer(s) of the tournament
– Best goalscorer(s) of the team

== Awards ==
Top scorer

- 1963: Mongi Haddad (4 goals)
- 2021: Seifeddine Jaziri (4 goals)

Team of the Tournament

- 2021: Seifeddine Jaziri, Youssef Msakni

Man of the match

- 2021: Seifeddine Jaziri (vs. Mauritania; Group B)
- 2021: Hannibal Mejbri (vs. United Arab Emirates; Group B)
- 2021: Mohamed Dräger (vs. Oman; Quarter-finals)
- 2021: Hannibal Mejbri (vs. Egypt; Semi-finals)
- 2025: Mohamed Ali Ben Romdhane (vs. Qatar; Group A)

== See also ==
- Tunisia at the FIFA World Cup
- Tunisia at the FIFA Confederations Cup
- Tunisia at the Africa Cup of Nations
- Tunisia at the African Nations Championship
