= 2021 FIFA Arab Cup Group B =

Second group (group stage) of 2021 FIFA Arab Cup

Group B of the 2021 FIFA Arab Cup took place from 30 November 2021 to 6 December 2021. The group consisted of Tunisia, the United Arab Emirates, Syria and Mauritania.

The top two teams, Tunisia and the United Arab Emirates, advanced to the quarter-finals.

== Teams ==
Draw position	Team	Finals appearance	Last appearance	Previous best performance	FIFA Rankings	
Draw position	Team	Finals appearance	Last appearance	Previous best performance	April 2021 (Note: The rankings of April 2021 were used for seeding for the final draw.)	November 2021
B1	Tunisia	3rd	1988 (group stage)	Winners (1963)	26	29
B2	United Arab Emirates	2nd	1998 (fourth place)	Fourth place (1998)	73	70
B3	Syria	7th	2002 (group stage)	Runners-up (1963, 1966, 1988)	79	85
B4	Mauritania	2nd	1985 (group stage)	Group stage (1985)	101	103

== Standings ==
Pos	Team	Pld	W	D	L	GF	GA	GD	Pts	Qualification
1	Tunisia	3	2	0	1	6	3	+3	6	Advance to knockout stage
2	United Arab Emirates	3	2	0	1	3	2	+1	6	Advance to knockout stage
3	Syria	3	1	0	2	4	4	0	3	
4	Mauritania	3	1	0	2	3	7	−4	3	

Source: FIFA

In the quarter-finals:

- Tunisia advanced to play against Oman (runners-up of Group A).
- United Arab Emirates advanced to play against Qatar (winners of Group A).

== Matches ==
=== Tunisia vs Mauritania ===
30 November 2021
13:00

Tunisia	5–1	Mauritania
Jaziri 39', 45+2'; Ben Larbi 42', 51'; Msakni 90+1'	Report	Bessam 45+12' (pen.)

Ahmad bin Ali Stadium, Al Rayyan
Attendance: 2,494
Referee: Alireza Faghani (Iran)

Tunisia	Mauritania

GK	1	Farouk Ben Mustapha (c)
RB	21	Hamza Mathlouthi
CB	2	Bilel Ifa
CB	4	Yassine Meriah
LB	14	Amine Ben Hamida
CM	15	Ali Ben Romdhane	(yellow card) 52'
CM	13	Ferjani Sassi		(substituted off) 70'
RW	10	Hannibal Mejbri		(substituted off) 64'
AM	8	Fakhreddine Ben Youssef		(substituted off) 64'
LW	9	Firas Ben Larbi		(substituted off) 70'
CF	11	Seifeddine Jaziri		(substituted off) 79'
Substitutes:
FW	23	Naïm Sliti		(substituted in) 64'
DF	12	Ali Maâloul		(substituted in) 64'
FW	7	Youssef Msakni		(substituted in) 70'
MF	6	Ghaylen Chaaleli		(substituted in) 70'
MF	17	Yassine Chikhaoui		(substituted in) 79'
Manager:
Mondher Kebaier

GK	22	Babacar Diop		(substituted off) 21' (Note: As Diaw came on as a concussion substitute for Diop, this did not count towards the limit of five substitutions allowed for Mauritania.)
RB	4	Harouna Abou Demba
CB	15	Bakary N'Diaye
CB	5	Abdoul Ba (c)		(substituted off) 46'
LB	3	Mohamedhen Beibou
CM	12	Alassane Diop		(substituted off) 46'
CM	14	Mohamed Dellahi Yali
RW	8	Mamadou Niass		(substituted off) 46'
AM	10	Adama Ba	(yellow card) 30'
LW	11	Bessam		(substituted off) 88'
CF	9	Hemeya Tanjy		(substituted off) 64'
Substitutes:
GK	16	Namori Diaw		(substituted in) 21'
FW	23	Mouhamed Soueid		(substituted in) 46'
MF	21	Ablaye Sy		(substituted in) 46'
MF	6	Guessouma Fofana		(substituted in) 46'
FW	19	Salem Dianos		(substituted in) 64'
FW	7	Idrissa Thiam		(substituted in) 88'
Manager:
(France) Didier Gomes Da Rosa

Assistant referees:
Mohammadreza Mansouri (Iran)
Mohammadreza Abolfazli (Iran)
Fourth official:
Fernando Hernández Gómez (Mexico)
Video assistant referee:
Khamis Al-Marri (Qatar)
Assistant video assistant referees:
Hiroyuki Kimura (Japan)

=== United Arab Emirates vs Syria ===
30 November 2021
22:00

United Arab Emirates	2–1	Syria
Caio 24'; Saleh 30'	Report	Al Salama 60'

Stadium 974, Doha
Attendance: 4,129
Referee: Janny Sikazwe (Zambia)

United Arab Emirates	Syria

GK	1	Ali Khasif
RB	9	Bandar Al-Ahbabi
CB	13	Mohammed Al-Attas
CB	3	Walid Abbas (c)
LB	21	Mahmoud Khamees	(yellow card) 85' (yellow-red card) 90+6'
CM	18	Abdullah Ramadan		(substituted off) 76'
CM	5	Ali Salmeen
RW	19	Tahnoon Al-Zaabi
AM	11	Caio Canedo
LW	16	Ali Saleh
CF	7	Ali Mabkhout
Substitutes:
FW	14	Khalil Ibrahim		(substituted in) 76'
Manager:
(Netherlands) Bert van Marwijk

GK	1	Ibrahim Alma (c)
CB	5	Yosief Mohammad	(substituted off) 71'
CB	13	Thaer Krouma
CB	19	Muayad Al Khouli
RM	6	Amro Jenyat
CM	18	Mouhamad Anez	(substituted off) 66'
CM	20	Oliver Kass Kawo	(substituted off) 80'
LM	3	Diaa Al-Haq Mohammad	(substituted off) 66'
RF	12	Mohammed Osman
CF	11	Mahmoud Al Baher
LF	8	Ward Alslamh	(substituted off) 80'
Substitutes:
DF	15	Mohammad Shehioni	(substituted in) 66'
MF	21	Mohammad Al Marmour	(substituted in) 66'
MF	14	Mohamad Rihanieh	(substituted in) 71'
FW	7	Mohammad Al Hallak	(substituted in) 80'
FW	9	Ali Bashmani	(substituted in) 80'
Manager:
(Romania) Valeriu Tița

Assistant referees:
Zakhele Siwela (South Africa)
Jerson dos Santos (Angola)
Fourth official:
Facundo Tello (Argentina)
Video assistant referee:
Shaun Evans (Australia)
Assistant video assistant referees:
Rédouane Jiyed (Morocco)
Danilo Manis (Brazil)
Éber Aquino (Paraguay)

=== Mauritania vs United Arab Emirates ===
3 December 2021
19:00

Mauritania	0–1	United Arab Emirates
	Report	Ibrahim 90+3'

Stadium 974, Doha
Attendance: 3,316
Referee: Andrés Matonte (Uruguay)

Mauritania	United Arab Emirates

GK	1	M'Backé N'Diaye
RB	6	Guessouma Fofana
CB	15	Bakary N'Diaye
CB	14	Mohamed Dellahi Yali
LB	3	Mohamedhen Beibou
CM	4	Harouna Abou Demba		(substituted off) 48'
CM	18	Bodda Mouhsine
CM	7	Idrissa Thiam
AM	10	Adama Ba (c)		(substituted off) 78'
CF	2	Moustapha Diaw	(yellow card) 45'	(substituted off) 57'
CF	9	Hemeya Tanjy		(substituted off) 78'
Substitutes:
MF	21	Ablaye Sy		(substituted in) 48'
FW	8	Mamadou Niass		(substituted in) 57'
MF	20	Oumar M'Bareck		(substituted in) 78'
FW	11	Bessam		(substituted in) 78'
Manager:
(France) Didier Gomes Da Rosa

GK	22	Mohamed Al-Shamsi
RB	9	Bandar Al-Ahbabi
CB	13	Mohammed Al-Attas
CB	3	Walid Abbas (c)	(yellow card) 85'
LB	2	Mohammed Al-Menhali		(substituted off) 85'
CM	18	Abdullah Ramadan
CM	5	Ali Salmeen
RW	19	Tahnoon Al-Zaabi
AM	11	Caio Canedo		(substituted off) 74'
LW	16	Ali Saleh		(substituted off) 81'
CF	7	Ali Mabkhout
Substitutes:
FW	14	Khalil Ibrahim		(substituted in) 74'
FW	10	Ismail Matar		(substituted in) 81'
FW	20	Sebastián Tagliabúe		(substituted in) 85'
Manager:
(Netherlands) Bert van Marwijk

Assistant referees:
Martin Soppi (Uruguay)
Carlos Barreiro (Uruguay)
Fourth official:
Alireza Faghani (Iran)
Video assistant referee:
Juan Soto (Venezuela)
Assistant video assistant referees:
Leodán González (Uruguay)
Christian Gittelmann (Germany)
Jair Marrufo (United States)

=== Syria vs Tunisia ===
3 December 2021
22:00

Syria	2–0	Tunisia
Kass Kawo 4'; Anez 47'	Report

Al Bayt Stadium, Al Khor
Attendance: 15,913
Referee: Fernando Hernández Gómez (Mexico)

Syria	Tunisia

GK	23	Khaled Haj Othman (c)
CB	5	Yosief Mohammad
CB	13	Thaer Krouma
CB	19	Muayad Al Khouli	(yellow card) 49'
RM	6	Amro Jenyat	(yellow card) 7'
CM	18	Mouhamad Anez
CM	20	Oliver Kass Kawo		(substituted off) 68'
LM	15	Mohammad Shehioni
RF	12	Mohammed Osman		(substituted off) 82'
CF	11	Mahmoud Al Baher		(substituted off) 68'
LF	8	Ward Alslamh		(substituted off) 68'
Substitutes:
FW	7	Mohammad Al Hallak		(substituted in) 68'
MF	14	Mohamad Rihanieh		(substituted in) 68'
MF	16	Kamel Hmeisheh		(substituted in) 68'
FW	9	Ali Bashmani		(substituted in) 82'
Manager:
(Romania) Valeriu Tița

GK	1	Farouk Ben Mustapha (c)
CB	6	Ghaylen Chaaleli	(yellow card) 75'
CB	15	Ali Ben Romdhane	(red card) 45+10'
CB	13	Ferjani Sassi		(substituted off) 86'
RM	8	Fakhreddine Ben Youssef		(substituted off) 46'
CM	2	Bilel Ifa
CM	4	Yassine Meriah
LM	14	Amine Ben Hamida
AM	10	Hannibal Mejbri
AM	9	Firas Ben Larbi		(substituted off) 55'
CF	11	Seifeddine Jaziri		(substituted off) 70'
Substitutes:
FW	23	Naïm Sliti		(substituted in) 46'
FW	7	Youssef Msakni		(substituted in) 55'
MF	18	Saad Bguir		(substituted in) 70'
MF	19	Mootez Zaddem		(substituted in) 86'
Manager
Mondher Kebaier

Assistant referees:
Micheal Barwegen (Canada)
Karen Diaz Medina (Mexico)
Fourth official:
Ryuji Sato (Japan)
Video assistant referee:
Adonai Escobedo (Mexico)
Assistant video assistant referees:
Éber Aquino (Paraguay)
Osamu Nomura (Japan)
Kevin Blom (Netherlands)

=== Syria vs Mauritania ===
6 December 2021
18:00

Syria	1–2	Mauritania
Al Baher 52'	Report	Soueid 50'; Tanjy 90+5'

Al Janoub Stadium, Al Wakrah
Attendance: 8,539
Referee: Wilton Sampaio (Brazil)

Syria	Mauritania

GK	23	Khaled Haj Othman (c)
CB	5	Yosief Mohammad	(yellow card) 39'	(substituted off) 46'
CB	13	Thaer Krouma
CB	19	Muayad Al Khouli
RM	6	Amro Jenyat
CM	18	Mouhamad Anez		(substituted off) 63'
CM	20	Oliver Kass Kawo		(substituted off) 86'
LM	15	Mohammad Shehioni
RF	12	Mohammed Osman		(substituted off) 76'
CF	11	Mahmoud Al Baher
LF	8	Ward Alslamh		(substituted off) 76'
Substitutes:
FW	10	Mahmoud Al Mawas		(substituted in) 46'
MF	14	Mohamad Rihanieh		(substituted in) 63'
MF	16	Kamel Hmeisheh		(substituted in) 76'
FW	7	Mohammad Al Hallaq		(substituted in) 76'
FW	9	Ali Bashmani		(substituted in) 86'
Manager:
(Romania) Valeriu Tița

GK	1	M'Backé N'Diaye
RB	4	Harouna Abou Demba
CB	6	Guessouma Fofana
CB	14	Mohamed Dellahi Yali (c)
LB	17	Demba Traoré	(yellow card) 81'	(substituted off) 85'
RM	2	Moustapha Diaw
CM	21	Ablaye Sy
CM	18	Bodda Mouhsine		(substituted off) 85'
LM	7	Idrissa Thiam
CF	8	Mamadou Niass	(yellow card) 3'	(substituted off) 59'
CF	23	Mouhamed Soueid		(substituted off) 69'
Substitutes:
FW	9	Hemeya Tanjy		(substituted in) 59'
MF	10	Adama Ba		(substituted in) 69'
DF	3	Mohamedhen Beibou		(substituted in) 85'
MF	12	Alassane Diop		(substituted in) 85'
Manager:
(France) Didier Gomes Da Rosa

Assistant referees:
Danilo Simon (Brazil)
Bruno Pires (Brazil)
Fourth official:
Janny Sikazwe (Zambia)
Video assistant referee:
Rafael Traci (Brazil)
Assistant video assistant referees:
Leodán González (Uruguay)
Zakhele Siwela (South Africa)
Guillermo Cuadra (Spain)

=== Tunisia vs United Arab Emirates ===
6 December 2021
18:00

Tunisia	1–0	United Arab Emirates
Jaziri 10'	Report

Al Thumama Stadium, Doha
Attendance: 14,272
Referee: Daniel Siebert (Germany)

Tunisia	United Arab Emirates

GK	22	Mouez Hassen
RB	20	Mohamed Dräger
CB	2	Bilel Ifa
CB	4	Yassine Meriah
LB	14	Amine Ben Hamida	(yellow card) 86'
CM	6	Ghaylen Chaaleli
CM	13	Ferjani Sassi
RW	7	Youssef Msakni (c)		(substituted off) 90'
AM	10	Hannibal Mejbri		(substituted off) 82'
LW	23	Naïm Sliti
CF	11	Seifeddine Jaziri		(substituted off) 68'
Substitutes:
FW	8	Fakhreddine Ben Youssef		(substituted in) 68'
MF	9	Firas Ben Larbi		(substituted in) 82'
MF	18	Saad Bguir		(substituted in) 90'
Manager:
Mondher Kebaier

GK	17	Khalid Eisa
RB	9	Bandar Al-Ahbabi
CB	13	Mohammed Al-Attas
CB	3	Walid Abbas (c)	(yellow card) 30'	(substituted off) 46'
LB	21	Mahmoud Khamees
CM	18	Abdullah Ramadan
CM	5	Ali Salmeen		(substituted off) 85'
RW	19	Tahnoon Al-Zaabi	(yellow card) 25'
AM	11	Caio Canedo		(substituted off) 74'
LW	16	Ali Saleh		(substituted off) 84'
CF	20	Sebastián Tagliabúe
Substitutes:
DF	6	Mohanad Salem	(yellow card) 48'	(substituted in) 46'
MF	14	Khalil Ibrahim		(substituted in) 74'
FW	10	Ismail Matar		(substituted in) 84'
FW	15	Mohammed Jumaa		(substituted in) 85'
Manager:
(Netherlands) Bert van Marwijk

Assistant referees:
Rafael Foltyn (Germany)
Christian Gittelmann (Germany)
Fourth official:
Matthew Conger (New Zealand)
Video assistant referee:
Christian Dingert (Germany)
Assistant video assistant referees:
Tomasz Kwiatkowski (Poland)
Jerson dos Santos (Angola)
Éber Aquino (Paraguay)
