= Tunisia national football team results (2020–present) =

This article provides details of international football games played by the Tunisia national football team from 2020 to present.

Summary since 2020
Information correct as of 17 November 2026, after the match against the Libya.
Pld	W	D	L	GF	GA	GD
93	46	23	24	126	80	+46
Biggest win
São Tomé and Príncipe 0–6 Tunisia; 10 October 2025; 2026 FIFA World Cup qualification
Biggest defeat
Belgium 5–0 Tunisia; 6 June 2026; Friendly Match
← 2000–19

Year	Pld	W	D	L	GF	GA	GD
2020	4	2	2	0	6	2	+4
2021	17	12	1	4	29	13	+16
2022	17	9	3	5	20	9	+11
2023	10	6	1	3	16	9	+7
2024	15	5	7	3	11	8	+3
2025	18	11	4	3	36	14	+24
2026	12	1	5	6	8	25	–17
Total	93	46	23	24	126	80	+46

== Results ==
Win Draw Loss Cancelled Fixture

=== 2020 ===
9 October Friendly	Tunisia	3–0	Sudan	Tunis, Tunisia
18:00 UTC+1	Khaoui 17'; Maâloul 25'; Ben Slimane 35'	Report		Stadium: Hammadi Agrebi Stadium; Attendance: 0 (Behind closed doors); Referee: Ibrahim Nour El Din (Egypt)

13 October Friendly	Nigeria	1–1	Tunisia	Sankt Veit an der Glan, Austria
19:30 UTC+2	Iheanacho 21'	Report	Dräger 44'	Stadium: Jacques Lemans Arena; Attendance: 0 (Behind closed doors); Referee: Sebastian Gishamer (Austria)

13 November 2021 AFCON qualification	Tunisia	1–0	Tanzania	Tunis, Tunisia
20:00 UTC+1	Msakni 18' (pen.)	Report		Stadium: Hammadi Agrebi Stadium; Attendance: 0 (Behind closed doors); Referee: Helder Martins de Carvalho (Angola)

17 November 2021 AFCON qualification	Tanzania	1–1	Tunisia	Dar es Salaam, Tanzania
20:00 UTC+3	Salum 48'	Report	Khaoui 11'	Stadium: National Stadium; Referee: Celso Alvação (Mozambique)

=== 2021 ===
25 March 2021 AFCON qualification	Libya	2–5	Tunisia	Benghazi, Libya
21:00 UTC+2	Ellafi 21', 54'	Report	Skhiri 39'; Jaziri 48', 90+3'; Dräger 51'; Ben Slimane 84'	Stadium: Martyrs of February Stadium; Referee: Daouda Guèye (Senegal)

28 March 2021 AFCON qualification	Tunisia	2–1	Equatorial Guinea	Tunis, Tunisia
14:00 UTC+1	Jaziri 4'; Akapo 52' (o.g.)	Report	Chaouat 88' (o.g.)	Stadium: Hammadi Agrebi Stadium; Attendance: 0 (Behind closed doors); Referee: Jean-Jacques Ndala (RD Congo)

5 June Friendly	Tunisia	1–0	DR Congo	Tunis, Tunisia
20:30 UTC+1	Sliti 45'	Report		Stadium: Hammadi Agrebi Stadium; Attendance: 0 (Behind closed doors); Referee: Mutaz Ibrahim (Libya)

11 June Friendly	Tunisia	0–2	Algeria	Tunis, Tunisia
20:30 UTC+1		Report	Bounedjah 19'; Mahrez 28'	Stadium: Hammadi Agrebi Stadium; Attendance: 0 (Behind closed doors); Referee: Mohamed Maarouf Eid Mansour (Egypt)

15 June Friendly	Tunisia	1–0	Mali	Tunis, Tunisia
20:30 UTC+1	Ben Slimane 90'	Report		Stadium: Hammadi Agrebi Stadium; Attendance: 0 (Behind closed doors); Referee: Ibrahim Nour El Din (Egypt)

3 September 2022 World Cup qualification	Tunisia	3–0	Equatorial Guinea	Tunis, Tunisia
20:00 UTC+1	Bronn 54'; Skhiri 78'; Khazri 82' (pen.)	Report		Stadium: Hammadi Agrebi Stadium; Attendance: 0 (Behind closed doors); Referee: Daniel Nii Laryea (Ghana)

7 September 2022 World Cup qualification	Zambia	0–2	Tunisia	Ndola, Zambia
15:00 UTC+2		Report	Khazri 8' (pen.); Ben Slimane 90+2'	Stadium: Levy Mwanawasa Stadium; Attendance: 5,000; Referee: Eric Otogo-Castane (Gabon)

7 October 2022 World Cup qualification	Tunisia	3–0	Mauritania	Tunis, Tunisia
20:00 UTC+1	Skhiri 15'; Khazri 42'; Jaziri 86'	Report		Stadium: Hammadi Agrebi Stadium; Attendance: 0 (Behind closed doors); Referee: Bamlak Tessema Weyesa (Ethiopia)

10 October 2022 World Cup qualification	Mauritania	0–0	Tunisia	Nouakchott, Mauritania
19:00 UTC+0		Report		Stadium: Stade Olympique de Nouakchott; Attendance: 500; Referee: Mehdi Abid Charef (Algeria)

13 November 2022 World Cup qualification	Equatorial Guinea	1–0	Tunisia	Malabo, Equatorial Guinea
17:00 UTC+1	Ganet 84'	Report		Stadium: Estadio de Malabo; Attendance: 500; Referee: Boubou Traoré (Mali)

16 November 2022 World Cup qualification	Tunisia	3–1	Zambia	Tunis, Tunisia
20:00 UTC+1	Laïdouni 18'; Dräger 31'; Maâloul 43'	Report	Sakala 80'	Stadium: Hammadi Agrebi Stadium; Attendance: 0 (Behind closed doors); Referee: Pacifique Ndabihawenimana (Burundi)

30 November 2021 FIFA Arab Cup GS	Tunisia	5–1	Mauritania	Al Rayyan, Qatar
13:00 UTC+3	Jaziri 39', 45+2'; Ben Larbi 42', 51'; Msakni 90+1'	Report	Bessam 45+12' (pen.)	Stadium: Ahmed bin Ali Stadium; Attendance: 2,494; Referee: Alireza Faghani (Iran)

3 December 2021 FIFA Arab Cup GS	Syria	2–0	Tunisia	Al Khor, Qatar
22:00 UTC+3	Kass Kawo 4'; Anz 47'	Report		Stadium: Al Bayt Stadium; Attendance: 15,913; Referee: Fernando Hernández Gómez (Mexico)

6 December 2021 FIFA Arab Cup GS	Tunisia	1–0	United Arab Emirates	Doha, Qatar
18:00 UTC+3	Jaziri 10'	Report		Stadium: Al Thumama Stadium; Attendance: 14,272; Referee: Daniel Siebert (Germany)

10 December 2021 FIFA Arab Cup QF	Tunisia	2–1	Oman	Al Rayyan, Qatar
18:00 UTC+3	Jaziri 16'; Msakni 69'	Report	A. Al-Alawi 66'	Stadium: Education City Stadium; Attendance: 21,329; Referee: Daniel Siebert (Germany)

15 December 2021 FIFA Arab Cup SF	Tunisia	1–0	Egypt	Doha, Qatar
18:00 UTC+3	El Solia 90+5' (o.g.)	Report		Stadium: Stadium 974; Attendance: 36,427; Referee: Alireza Faghani (Iran)

18 December 2021 FIFA Arab Cup F	Tunisia	0–2 (a.e.t.)	Algeria	Al Khor, Qatar
18:00 UTC+3		Report	Sayoud 99'; Brahimi 120+5'	Stadium: Al Bayt Stadium; Attendance: 60,456; Referee: Daniel Siebert (Germany)

=== 2022 ===
12 January 2021 AFCON GS	Tunisia	0–1	Mali	Limbe, Cameroon
14:00 UTC+1		Report	Koné 48' (pen.)	Stadium: Limbe Stadium; Referee: Janny Sikazwe (Zambia)

16 January 2021 AFCON GS	Tunisia	4–0	Mauritania	Limbe, Cameroon
17:00 UTC+1	Mathlouthi 4'; Khazri 8', 64'; Jaziri 66'	Report		Stadium: Limbe Stadium; Referee: Mahmoud El Banna (Egypt)

20 January 2021 AFCON GS	Gambia	1–0	Tunisia	Limbe, Cameroon
20:00 UTC+1	A. Jallow 90+3'	Report		Stadium: Limbe Stadium; Referee: Fernando Guerrero (Mexico)

23 January 2021 AFCON R16	Nigeria	0–1	Tunisia	Garoua, Cameroon
20:00 UTC+1		Report	Msakni 47'	Stadium: Roumdé Adjia Stadium; Referee: Maguette N'Diaye (Senegal)

29 January 2021 AFCON QF	Burkina Faso	1–0	Tunisia	Garoua, Cameroon
20:00 UTC+1	Da. Ouattara 45+3'	Report		Stadium: Roumdé Adjia Stadium; Referee: Joshua Bondo (Botswana)

25 March 2022 FIFA World Cup qualification	Mali	0–1	Tunisia	Bamako, Mali
17:00 UTC+0		Report	Sissako 36' (o.g.)	Stadium: Stade du 26 Mars; Attendance: 50,000; Referee: Bamlak Tessema Weyesa (Ethiopia)

29 March 2022 FIFA World Cup qualification	Tunisia	0–0 (1–0 agg.)	Mali	Tunis, Tunisia
20:30 UTC+1		Report		Stadium: Hammadi Agrebi Stadium, Tunis; Attendance: 50,000; Referee: Maguette N'Diaye (Senegal)

2 June 2023 AFCON qualification	Tunisia	4–0	Equatorial Guinea	Tunis, Tunisia
20:00 UTC+1	Sliti 56'; Jaziri 77'; Msakni 80', 85'	Report		Stadium: Hammadi Agrebi Stadium; Referee: Pacifique Ndabihawenimana (Burundi)

5 June 2023 AFCON qualification	Botswana	0–0	Tunisia	Francistown, Botswana
15:00 UTC+2		Report		Stadium: Francistown Stadium; Referee: Mohamed Athoumani (Comoros)

10 June 2022 Kirin Cup Soccer SF	Chile	0–2	Tunisia	Kobe, Japan
15:15 UTC+9		Report	Abdi 41'; Jebali 89'	Stadium: Noevir Stadium Kobe; Attendance: 4,973; Referee: Tanimoto Ryo (Japan)

14 June 2022 Kirin Cup Soccer F	Japan	0–3	Tunisia	Osaka, Japan
18:55 UTC+9		Report	Ben Romdhane 55' (pen.); Sassi 76'; Jebali 90+3'	Stadium: Panasonic Stadium Suita; Attendance: 31,292; Referee: Ahmed Eisa Darwish (United Arab Emirates)

22 September Friendly	Tunisia	1−0	Comoros	Croissy-sur-Seine, France
16:30 CEST (UTC+2)	Khenissi 59'	Report		Stadium: Stade du Chemin de Ronde; Attendance: 0 (Behind closed doors); Referee: Gabriel Henry (France)

27 September Friendly	Brazil	5–1	Tunisia	Paris, France
20:30 CEST (UTC+2)	Raphinha 11', 40'; Richarlison 19'; Neymar 29' (pen.); Pedro 74'	Report	Talbi 18'	Stadium: Parc des Princes; Attendance: 47,000; Referee: Ruddy Buquet (France)

16 November Friendly	Iran	0–2	Tunisia	Doha, Qatar
16:00 UTC+3		Report	Sliti 62' (pen.); Abdi 69'	Stadium: Al Rayyan SC Training Stadium; Attendance: 0 (Behind closed doors)

22 November 2022 FIFA World Cup GS	Denmark	0–0	Tunisia	Al Rayyan, Qatar
16:00 UTC+3		Report		Stadium: Education City Stadium; Attendance: 42,925; Referee: César Ramos (Mexico)

26 November 2022 FIFA World Cup GS	Tunisia	0–1	Australia	Al Wakrah, Qatar
13:00 UTC+3		Report	Duke 23'	Stadium: Al Janoub Stadium; Attendance: 41,823; Referee: Daniel Siebert (Germany)

30 November 2022 FIFA World Cup GS	Tunisia	1–0	France	Al Rayyan, Qatar
18:00 UTC+3	Khazri 58'	Report		Stadium: Education City Stadium; Attendance: 43,627; Referee: Matthew Conger (New Zealand)

=== 2023 ===
24 March 2023 AFCON qualification	Tunisia	3–0	Libya	Tunis, Tunisia
21:30 UTC+1	Msakni 12'; Maâloul 21' (pen.); Jouini 86'	Report		Stadium: Hammadi Agrebi Stadium; Referee: Mustapha Ghorbal (Algeria)

28 March 2023 AFCON qualification	Libya	0–1	Tunisia	Benghazi, Libya
22:00 UTC+2		Report	Jouini 16'	Stadium: Martyrs of February Stadium; Referee: Amin Omar (Egypt)

17 June 2023 AFCON qualification	Equatorial Guinea	1–0	Tunisia	Malabo, Equatorial Guinea
16:00 UTC+1	E. Nsue 85' (pen.)	Report		Stadium: Estadio de Malabo; Referee: Ibrahim Kalilou Traore (Ivory Coast)

20 June Friendly	Algeria	1–1	Tunisia	Annaba, Algeria
20:00 UTC+1	Mahrez 38' (pen.)	Report	Talbi 13'	Stadium: 19 May 1956 Stadium; Attendance: 50,000; Referee: Abdel Aziz Bouh (Mauritania)

7 September 2023 AFCON qualification	Tunisia	3–0	Botswana	Tunis, Tunisia
20:00 UTC+1	Velaphi 60' (o.g.); Msakni 82', 90+3'	Report		Stadium: Hammadi Agrebi Stadium; Referee: Issa Sy (Senegal)

12 September Friendly	Egypt	1–3	Tunisia	Cairo, Egypt
20:00 UTC+3	Kamal 34'	Report	Laïdouni 3'; Fathy 8' (o.g.); Rafia 90+5'	Stadium: 30 June Stadium; Referee: Ammar Ashkanani (Kuwait)

13 October Friendly	South Korea	4–0	Tunisia	Seoul, South Korea
20:00 UTC+9	Lee Kang-in 55', 57'; Meriah 66' (o.g.); Hwang Ui-jo 90+1'	Report		Stadium: Seoul World Cup Stadium; Attendance: 59,018; Referee: Amirul Izwan Yaacob (Malaysia)

17 October Friendly	Japan	2–0	Tunisia	Kobe, Japan
19:10 UTC+9	Furuhashi 43'; J. Ito 69'	Report		Stadium: Noevir Stadium Kobe; Attendance: 26,529; Referee: Wang Di (China)

17 November 2026 FIFA World Cup qualification	Tunisia	4–0	São Tomé and Príncipe	Tunis, Tunisia
20:00 UTC+1	Meriah 37'; Msakni 53'; Rafia 79'; Ben Larbi 88'	Report		Stadium: Hammadi Agrebi Stadium; Attendance: 10,000; Referee: Joseph Odey Ogabor (Nigeria)

21 November 2026 FIFA World Cup qualification	Malawi	0–1	Tunisia	Lilongwe, Malawi
15:00 UTC+2		Report	Msakni 87' (pen.)	Stadium: Bingu National Stadium; Attendance: 23,000; Referee: Aklesso Gnama (Togo)

=== 2024 ===
6 January Friendly	Tunisia	0–0	Mauritania	Tunis, Tunisia
19:30 UTC+1		Report		Stadium: Hammadi Agrebi Stadium; Referee: Abdulrazg Ahmed (Libya)

10 January Friendly	Tunisia	2–0	Cape Verde	Tunis, Tunisia
18:30 UTC+1	Achouri 12'; Msakni 53'	Report		Stadium: Hammadi Agrebi Stadium; Attendance: 0 (Behind closed doors); Referee: Nabil Boukhalfa (Algeria)

16 January 2023 AFCON GS	Tunisia	0–1	Namibia	Korhogo, Ivory Coast
17:00 UTC+0		Report	Hotto 88'	Stadium: Amadou Gon Coulibaly Stadium; Attendance: 13,991; Referee: Omar Abdulkadir Artan (Somalia)

20 January 2023 AFCON GS	Tunisia	1–1	Mali	Korhogo, Ivory Coast
20:00 UTC+0	Rafia 20'	Report	Sinayoko 10'	Stadium: Amadou Gon Coulibaly Stadium; Attendance: 18,130; Referee: Daniel Nii Laryea (Ghana)

24 January 2023 AFCON GS	South Africa	0–0	Tunisia	Korhogo, Ivory Coast
17:00 UTC+0		Report		Stadium: Amadou Gon Coulibaly Stadium; Attendance: 12,847; Referee: Issa Sy (Senegal)

23 March 2024 FIFA Series SF	Tunisia	0–0 (4–5 p)	Croatia	Cairo, Egypt
22:00 UTC+2		Report		Stadium: Cairo International Stadium; Attendance: 4,300; Referee: Mohamed Maarouf (Egypt)
	Penalties
	Ben Romdhane (penalty scored); Laïdouni (penalty scored); Abdi (penalty scored); Jelassi (penalty missed); Ltaief (penalty scored); Jaziri (penalty missed); Haddadi (penalty missed)		(penalty missed) Vlašić; (penalty scored) Kramarić; (penalty scored) Petković; (penalty scored) Majer; (penalty scored) Mario Pašalić; (penalty missed) Juranović; (penalty scored) Marco Pašalić

26 March 2024 FIFA Series 3rd	New Zealand	0–0 (2–4 p)	Tunisia	Cairo, Egypt
22:00 UTC+2		Report		Stadium: Cairo International Stadium, Cairo; Attendance: 45; Referee: Ahmed El Ghandour (Egypt)
	Penalties
	Waine (penalty missed); Barbarouses (penalty scored); Just (penalty missed); Rufer (penalty scored)		(penalty scored) Ben Romdhane; (penalty scored) Laïdouni; (penalty scored) Abdi; (penalty scored) Ghram

5 June 2026 FIFA World Cup qualification	Tunisia	1–0	Equatorial Guinea	Tunis, Tunisia
20:00 UTC+1	Ben Romdhane 82' (pen.)	Report		Stadium: Hammadi Agrebi Stadium; Attendance: 25,000; Referee: Abongile Tom (South Africa)

9 June 2026 FIFA World Cup qualification	Namibia	0–0	Tunisia	Johannesburg, South Africa
21:00 UTC+2		Report		Stadium: Orlando Stadium; Referee: Dahane Beida (Mauritania)

5 September 2025 AFCON qualification	Tunisia	1–0	Madagascar	Tunis, Tunisia
20:00 UTC+1	Sassi 90+8'	Report		Stadium: Hammadi Agrebi Stadium; Referee: Jean-Jacques Ndala (DR Congo)

8 September 2025 AFCON qualification	Gambia	1–2	Tunisia	El Jadida, Morocco
16:00 UTC+1	Sowe 14'	Report	Abdi 11'; Ben Romdhane 75'	Stadium: Ben M'Hamed El Abdi Stadium; Attendance: 1,000; Referee: Tewodros Mitiku (Ethiopia)

11 October 2025 AFCON qualification	Tunisia	0–1	Comoros	Tunis, Tunisia
20:00 UTC+1		Report	Saïd 63'	Stadium: Hammadi Agrebi Stadium; Attendance: 20,000; Referee: Joseph Ogabor (Nigeria)

15 October 2025 AFCON qualification	Comoros	1–1	Tunisia	Abidjan, Ivory Coast
19:00 UTC+0	Selemani 49'	Report	Meriah 69'	Stadium: Felix Houphouet Boigny Stadium; Attendance: 1,112; Referee: Tsegay Mogos Teklu (Eritrea)

14 November 2025 AFCON qualification	Madagascar	2–3	Tunisia	Pretoria, South Africa
17:00 UTC+2	Memmiche 20' (o.g.); Amada 45+1'	Report	Rafia 6'; Ltaief 40'; Abdi 90+3'	Stadium: Loftus Versfeld Stadium; Referee: Pierre Atcho (Gabon)

18 November 2025 AFCON qualification	Tunisia	0–1	Gambia	Tunis, Tunisia
20:00 UTC+1		Report	Ceesay 17'	Stadium: Hammadi Agrebi Stadium; Referee: Daniel Nii Laryea (Ghana)

=== 2025 ===
19 March 2026 FIFA World Cup qualification	Liberia	0–1	Tunisia	Paynesville, Liberia
16:00 UTC+0		Report	Mastouri 4'	Stadium: Samuel Kanyon Doe Sports Complex; Referee: Clement Franklin Kpan (Ivory Coast)

24 March 2026 FIFA World Cup qualification	Tunisia	2–0	Malawi	Tunis, Tunisia
22:00 UTC+1	Jaziri 86'; Achouri 90+2' (pen.)	Report		Stadium: Hammadi Agrebi Stadium; Attendance: 30,000; Referee: Djindo Louis Houngnandande (Benin)

2 June Friendly	Tunisia	2–0	Burkina Faso	Tunis, Tunisia
18:30 UTC+1	Tapsoba 60' (o.g.); Mastouri 90+1'	Report		Stadium: Hammadi Agrebi Stadium; Referee: Lahlou Benbraham (Algeria)

6 June Friendly	Morocco	2–0	Tunisia	Fez, Morocco
21:00 UTC+1	Hakimi 80'; Kaabi 90+4'	Report		Stadium: Fez Stadium; Attendance: 35,000; Referee: Boubou Traoré (Mali)

9 June Friendly	Tunisia	Cancelled	Central African Republic	Casablanca, Morocco
20:00 UTC+1		Report		Stadium: Larbi Zaouli Stadium
Note: The match was cancelled due to a strike by the Central African Republic players.

4 September 2026 FIFA World Cup qualification	Tunisia	3–0	Liberia	Tunis, Tunisia
20:00 UTC+1	Mastouri 5'; Sassi 66'; Saad 90+4'	Report		Stadium: Hammadi Agrebi Stadium; Attendance: 27,000; Referee: Adissa Ligali (Benin)

8 September 2026 FIFA World Cup qualification	Equatorial Guinea	0–1	Tunisia	Malabo, Equatorial Guinea
14:00 UTC+1		Report	Ben Romdhane 90+4'	Stadium: Estadio de Malabo; Referee: Patrice Milazare (Mauritius)

10 October 2026 FIFA World Cup qualification	São Tomé and Príncipe	0–6	Tunisia	Tunis, Tunisia
17:00 UTC+1		Report	Chaouat 36'; Saad 39', 43'; Gharbi 47'; Ben Romdhane 68' (pen.), 90'	Stadium: Hammadi Agrebi Stadium; Attendance: 5,000; Referee: Andofetra Rakotojaona (Madagascar)

13 October 2026 FIFA World Cup qualification	Tunisia	3–0	Namibia	Tunis, Tunisia
14:00 UTC+1		Report	Abdi 28' (pen.); Mejbri 55'; Sassi 64'	Stadium: Hammadi Agrebi Stadium; Referee: Issa Sy (Senegal)

12 November Friendly	Tunisia	1–1	Mauritania	Tunis, Tunisia
17:45 UTC+1	Chaouat 38'	Report	M. Sarr 51'	Stadium: Hammadi Agrebi Stadium; Referee: Rafik Aouina (Algeria)

14 November Friendly	Tunisia	3–2	Jordan	Tunis, Tunisia
17:45 UTC+1	Abdi 43'; Talbi 66'; Saad 85'	Report	Al-Naimat 29'; Jamous 50'	Stadium: Hammadi Agrebi Stadium; Attendance: 13,000; Referee: Samir Guezzaz (Morocco)

18 November Friendly	Brazil	1–1	Tunisia	Lille, France
20:30 UTC+1	Estêvão 44' (pen.)	Report	Mastouri 23'	Stadium: Stade Pierre-Mauroy; Attendance: 40,000; Referee: Jérôme Brisard (France)

1 December 2025 FIFA Arab Cup GS	Tunisia	0–1	Syria	Al Rayyan, Qatar
16:00 UTC+3		Report	Khribin 48'	Stadium: Ahmad bin Ali Stadium; Attendance: 26,966; Referee: Juan Calderón (Costa Rica)

4 December 2025 FIFA Arab Cup GS	Palestine	2–2	Tunisia	Lusail, Qatar
17:30 UTC+3	Hamdan 61'; Qunbar 85'	Report	Layouni 16'; Chaouat 51'	Stadium: Lusail Stadium; Attendance: 44,548; Referee: Ismail Elfath (United States)

7 December 2025 FIFA Arab Cup GS	Qatar	0–3	Tunisia	Al Khor, Qatar
20:00 UTC+3		Report	Ben Romdhane 16'; Meriah 62'; Ben Ali 90+4'	Stadium: Al Bayt Stadium; Attendance: 48,151; Referee: Espen Eskås (Norway)

18 December Friendly	Tunisia	2–1	Botswana	Tabarka, Tunisia
15:00 UTC+1	Sliti 85', 90+4' (pen.)	Report	Orebonye 50'	Stadium: La Cigale Training Center; Attendance: 0 (Behind closed doors); Referee: Abdelwahid Haridiwa (Libya)

23 December 2025 AFCON GS	Tunisia	3–1	Uganda	Rabat, Morocco
21:00 UTC+1	Skhiri 10'; Achouri 40', 64'	Report	Omedi 90+2'	Stadium: Rabat Olympic Stadium; Attendance: 13,387; Referee: Patrice Mebiame (Gabon)

27 December 2025 AFCON GS	Nigeria	3–2	Tunisia	Fez, Morocco
21:00 UTC+1	Osimhen 44'; Ndidi 50'; Lookman 67'	Report	Talbi 74'; Abdi 87' (pen.)	Stadium: Fez Stadium; Attendance: 25,544; Referee: Boubou Traore (Mali)

30 December 2025 AFCON GS	Tanzania	1–1	Tunisia	Rabat, Morocco
17:00 UTC+1	Salum 48'	Report	Gharbi 43' (pen.)	Stadium: Rabat Olympic Stadium; Attendance: 15,205; Referee: Jean-Jacques Ndala (DR Congo)

=== 2026 ===
3 January 2025 AFCON R16	Mali	1–1 (a.e.t.) (3–2 p)	Tunisia	Casablanca, Morocco
20:00 UTC+1	Sinayoko 90+6' (pen.)	Report	Chaouat 88'	Stadium: Mohammed V Stadium; Attendance: 41,982; Referee: Abongile Tom (South Africa)
	Penalties
	Bissouma (penalty missed); Sinayoko (penalty scored); Dorgeles (penalty missed); Diakité (penalty scored); Touré (penalty scored)		(penalty scored) Meriah; (penalty missed) Abdi; (penalty scored) Saad; (penalty missed) Achouri; (penalty missed) Ben Romdhane

28 March Friendly	Haiti	0–1	Tunisia	Toronto, Canada
20:00 UTC−4		Report	Tounekti 7'	Stadium: BMO Field; Attendance: 13,408; Referee: Pierre-Luc Lauzière (Canada)

31 March Friendly	Canada	0–0	Tunisia	Toronto, Canada
21:00 UTC−4 (Note: The Canada v Tunisia match, originally to be played at 19:30 UTC−4, was delayed by 90 minutes due to bad weather.)		Report		Stadium: BMO Field; Attendance: 22,624; Referee: Keylor Herrera (Costa Rica)

1 June Friendly	Austria	1–0	Tunisia	Vienna, Austria
20:45 UTC+2	Sabitzer 63'	Report		Stadium: Ernst-Happel-Stadion; Attendance: 35,100; Referee: Jérémie Pignard (France)

6 June Friendly	Belgium	5–0	Tunisia	Brussels, Belgium
15:00 UTC+2	Trossard 28'; De Ketelaere 53'; De Bruyne 65'; Lukébakio 85'; Raskin 87'	Report		Stadium: King Baudouin Stadium; Attendance: 40,236; Referee: Anastasios Sidiropoulos (Greece)

14 June 2026 FIFA World Cup GS	Sweden	5–1	Tunisia	Monterrey, Mexico
20:00 UTC−6	Ayari 7', 90+6'; Isak 30'; Gyökeres 59'; Svanber 84'	Report	Rekik 43'	Stadium: Estadio BBVA; Attendance: 50,987; Referee: Yael Falcón (Argentina)

20 June 2026 FIFA World Cup GS	Tunisia	0–4	Japan	Monterrey, Mexico
22:00 UTC−6		Report	Kamada 4'; Ueda 31', 83'; J. Itō 69'	Stadium: Estadio BBVA; Attendance: 51,243; Referee: István Kovács (Romania)

25 June 2026 FIFA World Cup GS	Tunisia	1–3	Netherlands	Kansas City, United States
18:00 UTC−5	Mastouri 54'	Report	Skhiri 3' (o.g.); Brobbey 7'; van Hecke 62'	Stadium: Arrowhead Stadium; Attendance: 68,391; Referee: Katia Itzel García (Mexico)

24 September 2027 AFCON qualification	Tunisia	1–1	Uganda	Tunis, Tunisia
20:00 UTC+1	Arous 12'	Report	Mato 68'	Stadium: Hammadi Agrebi Stadium; Referee: Abdelaziz Bouh (Mauritania)

29 September 2027 AFCON qualification	Tunisia	2–2	Botswana	Tunis, Tunisia
20:00 UTC+1	Mastouri 44', 49'	Report	Kgamanyane 38'; Ditsele 60'	Stadium: Hammadi Agrebi Stadium; Referee: Ahmed Arajiga (Tanzania)

3 October Friendly	Tunisia	Cancelled	Mali	Tunis, Tunisia
20:00 UTC+1				Stadium: Hammadi Agrebi Stadium

13 November 2027 AFCON qualification	Tunisia	0–2	Libya	Sfax, Tunisia
17:00 UTC+1		Report	Youssef 14' (pen.); Elhouni 62'	Stadium: Taieb Mhiri Stadium; Referee: Hamza El Fariq (Morocco)

17 November 2027 AFCON qualification	Libya	1–1	Tunisia	Tripoli, Libya
18:00 UTC+2	El Maremi 45+5'	Report	Ben Slimane 3'	Stadium: Tripoli Stadium; Attendance: 0 (Behind closed doors); Referee: Raphiou Ligali (Benin)

=== 2027 ===
24 March 2027 AFCON qualification	Uganda	v	Tunisia	Uganda

28 March 2027 AFCON qualification	Botswana	v	Tunisia	Botswana
