= 2021 FIFA Arab Cup knockout stage =

Second stage of 2021 FIFA Arab Cup

The knockout stage of the 2021 FIFA Arab Cup was the second and final stage of the competition, following the group stage. It began on 10 December with the quarter-finals and ended on 18 December with the final match, held at the Al Bayt Stadium in Al Khor. The top two teams from each group (8 in total) advanced to the knockout stage to compete in a single-elimination tournament. A third place play-off was also played between the two losing semi-finalists.

All times are local, AST (UTC+3).

== Qualified teams ==
The top two highest-placing teams from each of the two groups advanced to the knockout stage.

Group	Winners	Runners-up
A	Qatar	Oman
B	Tunisia	United Arab Emirates
C	Morocco	Jordan
D	Egypt	Algeria

== Bracket ==
Quarter-finals
10 December – Al Rayyan (ECS)
Tunisia	2
Oman	1
11 December – Al Wakrah
Egypt (a.e.t.)	3
Jordan	1
10 December – Al Khor
Qatar	5
United Arab Emirates	0
11 December – Doha (ATS)
Morocco	2 (3)
Algeria (p)	2 (5)

Semi-finals
15 December – Doha (S974)
Tunisia	1
Egypt	0
15 December – Doha (ATS)
Qatar	1
Algeria	2

Final
18 December – Al Khor
Tunisia	0
Algeria (a.e.t.)	2
Third place play-off
18 December – Doha (S974)
Egypt	0 (4)
Qatar (p)	0 (5)

== Quarter-finals ==
=== Tunisia vs Oman ===
10 December 2021
18:00

Tunisia	2–1	Oman
Jaziri 16'; Msakni 69'	Report	A. Al-Alawi 66'

Education City Stadium, Al Rayyan
Attendance: 21,329
Referee: Daniel Siebert (Germany)

Tunisia	Oman

GK	22	Mouez Hassen
RB	20	Mohamed Dräger
CB	4	Yassine Meriah
CB	2	Bilel Ifa
LB	14	Amine Ben Hamida
CM	6	Ghaylen Chaaleli
CM	13	Ferjani Sassi
RW	7	Youssef Msakni (c)	(substituted off) 77'
AM	10	Hannibal Mejbri	(substituted off) 89'
LW	23	Naïm Sliti	(substituted off) 77'
CF	11	Seifeddine Jaziri	(substituted off) 83'
Substitutes:
MF	9	Firas Ben Larbi	(substituted on) 77'
MF	18	Saad Bguir	(substituted on) 77'
FW	8	Fakhreddine Ben Youssef	(substituted on) 83'
MF	19	Mootez Zaddem	(substituted on) 89'
Manager
Mondher Kebaier

GK	1	Ibrahim Al-Mukhaini
RB	21	Abdulaziz Al-Gheilani		(substituted off) 72'
CB	6	Ahmed Al Khamisi
CB	5	Juma Al-Habsi
LB	2	Ahmed Al-Kaabi	(yellow card) 68'	(substituted off) 85'
CM	12	Abdullah Fawaz		(substituted off) 72'
CM	23	Harib Al-Saadi (c)	(yellow card) 70'
CM	4	Arshad Al-Alawi
RF	20	Salaah Al-Yahyaei
CF	7	Khalid Al-Hajri		(substituted off) 57'
LF	19	Rabia Al-Alawi		(substituted off) 57'
Substitutes:
MF	8	Mataz Saleh		(substituted on) 57'
FW	9	Issam Al Sabhi		(substituted on) 57'
DF	3	Fahmi Durbin		(substituted on) 72'
FW	15	Jameel Al-Yahmadi		(substituted on) 72'
FW	11	Muhsen Al-Ghassani		(substituted on) 85'
Manager:
(Croatia) Branko Ivanković

Assistant referees:
Rafael Foltyn (Germany)
Christian Gittelmann (Germany)
Fourth official:
Matthew Conger (New Zealand)
Video assistant referee:
Christian Dingert (Germany)
Assistant video assistant referees:
Kevin Blom (Netherlands)
Paweł Sokolnicki (Poland)
Tomasz Kwiatkowski (Poland)

=== Qatar vs United Arab Emirates ===
10 December 2021
22:00

Qatar	5–0	United Arab Emirates
Salmeen 6' (o.g.); Ali 28' (pen.), 45+3'; Khoukhi 36' (pen.); Hatem 44'	Report

Al Bayt Stadium, Al Khor
Attendance: 63,439
Referee: Andrés Matonte (Uruguay)

Qatar	United Arab Emirates

GK	1	Saad Al-Sheeb
RB	17	Ismaeel Mohammad
CB	16	Boualem Khoukhi
CB	15	Bassam Al-Rawi		(substituted off) 60'
LB	3	Abdelkarim Hassan
CM	12	Karim Boudiaf	(yellow card) 58'	(substituted off) 60'
CM	6	Abdulaziz Hatem
CM	14	Homam Ahmed		(substituted off) 60'
RF	10	Hassan Al-Haydos (c)
CF	19	Almoez Ali		(substituted off) 81'
LF	11	Akram Afif	(yellow card) 45+2'	(substituted off) 65'
Substitutes:
MF	4	Mohammed Waad		(substituted on) 60'
DF	5	Tarek Salman		(substituted on) 60'
MF	20	Abdullah Al-Ahrak		(substituted on) 60'
FW	7	Ahmed Alaaeldin		(substituted on) 65'
MF	8	Ali Assadalla		(substituted on) 81'
Manager:
(Spain) Félix Sánchez

GK	1	Ali Khasif (c)
RB	9	Bandar Al-Ahbabi	(yellow card) 38'
CB	13	Mohammed Al-Attas
CB	6	Mohanad Salem		(substituted off) 46'
LB	21	Mahmoud Khamees		(substituted off) 76'
CM	18	Abdullah Ramadan
CM	5	Ali Salmeen		(substituted off) 46'
RW	19	Tahnoon Al-Zaabi
AM	11	Caio Canedo
LW	16	Ali Saleh	(yellow card) 41'	(substituted off) 46'
CF	20	Sebastián Tagliabúe		(substituted off) 76'
Substitutes:
DF	4	Shahin Abdulrahman		(substituted on) 46'
FW	7	Ali Mabkhout		(substituted on) 46'
FW	14	Khalil Ibrahim		(substituted on) 46'
DF	2	Mohammed Al-Menhali		(substituted on) 76'
FW	15	Mohammed Jumaa		(substituted on) 76'
Manager:
(Netherlands) Bert van Marwijk

Assistant referees:
Martin Soppi (Uruguay)
Carlos Barreiro (Uruguay)
Fourth official:
Janny Sikazwe (Zambia)
Video assistant referee:
Leodán González (Uruguay)
Assistant video assistant referees:
Juan Soto (Venezuela)
Ezequiel Brailovsky (Argentina)
Hiroyuki Kimura (Japan)

=== Egypt vs Jordan ===
11 December 2021
18:00

Egypt	3–1 (a.e.t.)	Jordan
Mar. Hamdy 45+1'; Refaat 100'; Dawoud 119'	Report	Al-Naimat 12'

Al Janoub Stadium, Al Wakrah
Attendance: 28,306
Referee: Said Martínez (Honduras)

Egypt	Jordan

GK	1	Mohamed El Shenawy
RB	3	Omar Kamal		(substituted off) 106'
CB	2	Ahmed Yassin
CB	15	Mahmoud Hamdy
LB	13	Ahmed Fatouh	(yellow card) 37'
CM	5	Hamdy Fathy		(substituted off) 72'
CM	4	Amr El Solia (c)
RW	21	Ahmed Sayed		(substituted off) 106'
AM	8	Mostafa Fathi		(substituted off) 72'
LW	20	Hussein Faisal		(substituted off) 58'
CF	10	Marwan Hamdy		(substituted off) 91'
Substitutions:
FW	9	Mohamed Sherif		(substituted on) 58'
MF	17	Mohanad Lasheen		(substituted on) 72'
MF	22	Mohamed Magdy		(substituted on) 72'
FW	7	Ahmed Refaat		(substituted on) 91'
DF	18	Mohamed Abdelmonem		(substituted on) 106'
DF	6	Marwan Dawoud		(substituted on) 106'
Manager:
(Portugal) Carlos Queiroz

GK	1	Yazid Abu Layla
CB	19	Abdallah Nasib
CB	4	Baha' Abdel-Rahman (c)
CB	6	Hadi Al-Hourani
RWB	23	Ihsan Haddad
LWB	2	Mohammad Abu Hasheesh
CM	7	Mohammad Abu Zrayq	(yellow card) 54'	(substituted off) 60'
CM	8	Noor Al-Rawabdeh		(substituted off) 106'
CM	13	Mahmoud Al-Mardi		(substituted off) 77'
CF	16	Ali Olwan
CF	10	Yazan Al-Naimat		(substituted off) 90+5'
Substitutions:
FW	11	Yaseen Al-Bakhit		(substituted on) 60'
FW	20	Hamza Al-Dardour		(substituted on) 77'
MF	17	Rajaei Ayed		(substituted on) 90+5'
MF	15	Ibrahim Sadeh		(substituted on) 106'
Manager:
(Iraq) Adnan Hamad

Assistant referees:
Walter López (Honduras)
Christian Ramirez (Honduras)
Fourth official:
Fernando Hernández Gómez (Mexico)
Video assistant referee:
Fernando Guerrero (Mexico)
Assistant video assistant referees:
Jair Marrufo (United States)
Gabriel Chade (Argentina)
Shaun Evans (Australia)

=== Morocco vs Algeria ===
11 December 2021
22:00

Morocco	2–2 (a.e.t.)	Algeria
Nahiri 64'; Benoun 111'	Report	Brahimi 62' (pen.); Belaïli 102'
Penalties
Rahimi (penalty scored); Benoun (penalty scored); Jabrane (penalty scored); El Berkaoui (penalty missed)	3–5	(penalty scored) Belaïli; (penalty scored) Bendebka; (penalty scored) Bedrane; (penalty scored) Benayada; (penalty scored) Tougai

Al Thumama Stadium, Doha
Attendance: 24,823
Referee: Wilton Sampaio (Brazil)

Morocco	Algeria

GK	1	Anas Zniti
RB	19	Mohamed Chibi	(yellow card) 119'
CB	4	Marwane Saâdane	(yellow card) 17'
CB	13	Badr Benoun (c)	(yellow card) 84'
LB	16	Mohammed Nahiri
CM	5	Yahya Jabrane
CM	8	Walid El Karti		(substituted off) 100'
RW	17	Achraf Bencharki
AM	18	Abdelilah Hafidi		(substituted off) 106'
LW	11	Ismail El Haddad	(yellow card) 34'	(substituted off) 61'
CF	9	Oualid Azaro		(substituted off) 61'
Substitutions:
FW	14	Karim El Berkaoui		(substituted on) 61'
FW	21	Soufiane Rahimi		(substituted on) 61'
MF	6	Mohammed Ali Bemammer		(substituted on) 100'
MF	10	Ayman El Hassouni		(substituted on) 106'
Manager:
Hussein Ammouta

GK	23	Raïs M'Bolhi (c)
RB	3	Houcine Benayada
CB	12	Mohamed Amine Tougai
CB	19	Abdelkader Bedrane
LB	20	Ilyes Chetti
CM	18	Houssem Eddine Mrezigue
CM	14	Sofiane Bendebka
RW	7	Tayeb Meziani	(substituted off) 73'
AM	11	Yacine Brahimi	(substituted off) 114'
LW	10	Youcef Belaïli
CF	13	Merouane Zerrouki	(substituted off) 46'
Substitutions:
MF	17	Zakaria Draoui	(substituted on) 46'
FW	22	Zineddine Boutmène	(substituted on) 73'
DF	5	Mehdi Tahrat	(substituted on) 114'
Manager:
Madjid Bougherra

Assistant referees:
Danilo Manis (Brazil)
Bruno Pires (Brazil)
Fourth official:
Ryuji Sato (Japan)
Video assistant referee:
Rafael Traci (Brazil)
Assistant video assistant referees:
Guillermo Cuadra Fernández (Spain)
Jerson dos Santos (Angola)
Adonai Escobedo (Mexico)

== Semi-finals ==
=== Tunisia vs Egypt ===
15 December 2021
18:00

Tunisia	1–0	Egypt
El Solia 90+5' (o.g.)	Report

Stadium 974, Doha
Attendance: 36,427
Referee: Alireza Faghani (Iran)

Tunisia	Egypt

GK	22	Mouez Hassen
CB	2	Bilel Ifa
CB	3	Montassar Talbi
CB	4	Yassine Meriah		(substituted off) 40'
RM	20	Mohamed Dräger
CM	6	Ghaylen Chaaleli
CM	13	Ferjani Sassi
LM	14	Amine Ben Hamida
RF	10	Hannibal Mejbri		(substituted off) 81'
CF	11	Seifeddine Jaziri	(yellow card) 90+6'
LF	7	Youssef Msakni (c)	(yellow card) 50'
Substitutes:
MF	15	Ali Ben Romdhane		(substituted on) 40'
FW	23	Naïm Sliti		(substituted on) 81'
Manager
Mondher Kebaier

GK	1	Mohamed El Shenawy
RB	14	Akram Tawfik
CB	11	Ahmed Hegazi	(yellow card) 68'
CB	15	Mahmoud Hamdy
LB	13	Ahmed Fatouh
CM	5	Hamdy Fathy	(yellow card) 80'
CM	4	Amr El Solia (c)
RW	21	Ahmed Sayed
AM	22	Mohamed Magdy		(substituted off) 46'
LW	20	Hussein Faisal		(substituted off) 69'
CF	10	Marwan Hamdy		(substituted off) 89'
Substitutions:
FW	9	Mohamed Sherif		(substituted on) 46'
MF	8	Mostafa Fathi		(substituted on) 69'
FW	19	Osama Faisal		(substituted on) 89'
Manager:
(Portugal) Carlos Queiroz

Assistant referees:
Rafael Foltyn (Germany)
Christian Gittelmann (Germany)
Fourth official:
Andrés Matonte (Uruguay)
Video assistant referee:
Guillermo Cuadra Fernández (Spain)
Assistant video assistant referees:
Shaun Evans (Australia)
Bruno Pires (Brazil)
Christian Dingert (Germany)

=== Qatar vs Algeria ===
15 December 2021
22:00

Qatar	1–2	Algeria
Muntari 90+7'	Report	Benlamri 59'; Belaïli 90+17'

Al Thumama Stadium, Doha
Attendance: 42,405
Referee: Szymon Marciniak (Poland)

Qatar	Algeria

GK	1	Saad Al-Sheeb
RB	17	Ismaeel Mohammad
CB	15	Bassam Al-Rawi		(substituted off) 90'
CB	16	Boualem Khoukhi
LB	3	Abdelkarim Hassan
DM	12	Karim Boudiaf		(substituted off) 64'
DM	14	Homam Ahmed
CM	6	Abdulaziz Hatem
RF	10	Hassan Al-Haydos (c)
CF	19	Almoez Ali	(yellow card) 23'
LF	11	Akram Afif
Substitutes:
FW	9	Mohammed Muntari		(substituted on) 64'
DF	5	Tarek Salman		(substituted on) 90'
Manager:
(Spain) Félix Sánchez

GK	23	Raïs M'Bolhi (c)
RB	3	Houcine Benayada
CB	4	Djamel Benlamri	(yellow card) 90+10'
CB	19	Abdelkader Bedrane
LB	20	Ilyes Chetti
CM	14	Sofiane Bendebka
CM	17	Zakaria Draoui
RW	7	Tayeb Meziani		(substituted off) 76'
AM	11	Yacine Brahimi	(yellow card) 8'
LW	10	Youcef Belaïli	(yellow card) 90+8'
CF	9	Baghdad Bounedjah		(substituted off) 68'
Substitutions:
DF	5	Mehdi Tahrat		(substituted on) 68'
FW	15	Hillal Soudani		(substituted on) 76'
Manager:
Madjid Bougherra

Assistant referees:
Paweł Sokolnicki (Poland)
Tomasz Listkiewicz (Poland)
Fourth official:
Said Martínez (Honduras)
Video assistant referee:
Tomasz Kwiatkowski (Poland)
Assistant video assistant referees:
Kevin Blom (Netherlands)
Ezequiel Brailovsky (Argentina)
Adonai Escobedo (Mexico)

== Third place play-off ==
18 December 2021
13:00

Egypt	0–0 (a.e.t.)	Qatar
	Report
Penalties
Afsha (penalty scored); El Solia (penalty scored); Hegazi (penalty missed); Fatouh (penalty scored); Tawfik (penalty scored); Sherif (penalty missed)	4–5	(penalty missed) Al-Haydos; (penalty scored) Khoukhi; (penalty scored) Hassan; (penalty scored) Alaaeldin; (penalty scored) Afif; (penalty scored) Boudiaf

Stadium 974, Doha
Attendance: 30,978
Referee: Facundo Tello (Argentina)

Egypt	Qatar

GK	1	Mohamed El Shenawy
RB	3	Omar Kamal	(substituted off) 119'
CB	18	Mohamed Abdel Monem
CB	15	Mahmoud Hamdy	(substituted off) 91'
LB	13	Ahmed Fatouh
DM	5	Hamdy Fathy	(substituted off) 91'
CM	4	Amr El Solia (c)
CM	17	Mohanad Lasheen
RW	21	Ahmed Sayed	(substituted off) 91'
LW	7	Ahmed Refaat	(substituted off) 85'
CF	9	Mohamed Sherif
Substitutions:
FW	10	Marwan Hamdy	(substituted on) 85'
MF	8	Mostafa Fathi	(substituted on) 91'
DF	11	Ahmed Hegazi	(substituted on) 91'
DF	14	Akram Tawfik	(substituted on) 91'
MF	22	Mohamed Magdy	(substituted on) 119'
Manager:
(Portugal) Carlos Queiroz

GK	22	Meshaal Barsham
RB	17	Ismaeel Mohammad		(substituted off) 78'
CB	5	Tarek Salman
CB	16	Boualem Khoukhi
LB	14	Homam Ahmed		(substituted off) 78'
DM	23	Assim Madibo		(substituted off) 58'
CM	4	Mohammed Waad	(yellow card) 3'
CM	6	Abdulaziz Hatem (c)		(substituted off) 74'
RW	20	Abdullah Al-Ahrak		(substituted off) 58'
LW	11	Akram Afif
CF	19	Almoez Ali		(substituted off) 119'
Substitutes:
FW	10	Hassan Al-Haydos		(substituted on) 58'
MF	12	Karim Boudiaf		(substituted on) 58'
FW	9	Mohammed Muntari		(substituted on) 74'
DF	3	Abdelkarim Hassan		(substituted on) 78'
DF	13	Musab Kheder		(substituted on) 78'
FW	7	Ahmed Alaaeldin		(substituted on) 119'
Manager:
(Spain) Félix Sánchez

Assistant referees:
Ezequiel Brailovsky (Argentina)
Gabriel Chade (Argentina)
Fourth official:
Said Martínez (Honduras)
Video assistant referee:
Juan Soto (Venezuela)
Assistant video assistant referees:
Leodán González (Uruguay)
Bruno Pires (Brazil)
Guillermo Cuadra Fernández (Spain)

== Final ==
18 December 2021
18:00

Tunisia	0–2 (a.e.t.)	Algeria
	Report	Sayoud 99'; Brahimi 120+5'

Al Bayt Stadium, Al Khor
Attendance: 60,456
Referee: Daniel Siebert (Germany)

Tunisia	Algeria

GK	22	Mouez Hassen
RB	20	Mohamed Dräger
CB	2	Bilel Ifa
CB	3	Montassar Talbi
LB	14	Amine Ben Hamida	(yellow card) 43'	(substituted off) 101'
CM	6	Ghaylen Chaaleli
CM	13	Ferjani Sassi	(yellow card) 64'	(substituted off) 101'
RW	7	Youssef Msakni (c)	(yellow card) 39'
AM	10	Hannibal Mejbri		(substituted off) 88'
LW	23	Naïm Sliti		(substituted off) 110'
CF	11	Seifeddine Jaziri	(yellow card) 40'
Substitutions:
MF	15	Ali Ben Romdhane		(substituted on) 88'
DF	12	Ali Maâloul		(substituted on) 101'
MF	18	Saad Bguir		(substituted on) 101'
MF	9	Firas Ben Larbi		(substituted on) 110'
Manager:
Mondher Kebaier

GK	23	Raïs M'Bolhi (c)
RB	3	Houcine Benayada		(substituted off) 120+3'
CB	4	Djamel Benlamri
CB	19	Abdelkader Bedrane
LB	20	Ilyes Chetti	(yellow card) 13'
CM	18	Houssem Eddine Mrezigue		(substituted off) 91'
CM	14	Sofiane Bendebka	(yellow card) 90+3'	(substituted off) 118'
RW	7	Tayeb Meziani		(substituted off) 66'
AM	11	Yacine Brahimi	(yellow card) 120+4'
LW	10	Youcef Belaïli
CF	9	Baghdad Bounedjah	(yellow card) 40'
Substitutions:
MF	8	Amir Sayoud		(substituted on) 66'
MF	17	Zakaria Draoui		(substituted on) 91'
DF	5	Mehdi Tahrat		(substituted on) 118'
DF	12	Mohamed Amine Tougai		(substituted on) 120+3'
Manager:
Madjid Bougherra

Man of the Match:
Amir Sayoud (Algeria)

Assistant referees:
Rafael Foltyn (Germany)
Christian Gittelmann (Germany)
Fourth official:
Matthew Conger (New Zealand)
Reserve assistant referee:
Tevita Makasini (Tonga)
Video assistant referee:
Christian Dingert (Germany)
Assistant video assistant referees:
Kevin Blom (Netherlands)
Jun Mihara (Japan)
Shaun Evans (Australia)
