= Muayad =

Muayad, Muayyad, or Muayyed, is an Arabic given name.

People with this name include:

- Al-Mu'ayyad fi'l-Din al-Shirazi, 11th century Arab/Persian scholar
- Muayad Al-Haddad (born 1960), former Kuwaiti footballer
- Muayad Al Khouli (born 1993), Syrian footballer
- Muayad Alayan, Palestinian filmmaker, director of The Reports on Sarah and Saleem (2018)
- Muayad Khalid, former Iraqi footballer
- Mu'ayyad al-Din al-Urdi, 11th century Syrian Arab astronomer
- Muayyed Nureddin, an Iraqi Canadian geologist who was imprisoned and tortured in Syria in December 2003

== See also ==
- Mosque of Sultan al-Muayyad, a mosque in Cairo, Egypt
