= Ward Al Salama =

Syrian footballer (born 1994)

Personal information
- Full name: Ward Farhan Al Salama
- Date of birth: 15 July 1994 (age 32)
- Place of birth: Deir ez-Zor, Syria
- Height: 1.70 m (5 ft 7 in)
- Position: Midfielder

Team information
- Current team: Al-Fotuwa
- Number: 8

Youth career
- Al-Fotuwa

Senior career*
Years	Team	Apps	(Gls)
2014–2016	Al-Fotuwa		
2016–2017	Al-Karkh		
2017–2017	Al-Jaish		
2018	Al-Wehdat		
2018–2019	Tishreen		
2019–2021	Al-Jaish		
2021	Al-Bukayriyah	17	(1)
2021–2022	Al-Manama	10	(0)
2022–2023	Al-Qaisumah	28	(1)
2023–	Al-Fotuwa		

International career^{‡}
2019–	Syria	21	(2)
- * Club domestic league appearances and goals ‡ National team caps and goals as of 27 January 2022

Ward Farhan Al Salama (born 15 July 1994) is a Syrian professional footballer who plays for Al-Fotuwa and the Syrian national team.

== International career ==
On 19 November 2019, Al Salama scored his first goal for Syria in the major competition of the 2022 FIFA World Cup qualification against the Philippines in a 1–0 victory.

== Career statistics ==
=== International ===
As of match played 27 January 2022

Appearances and goals by national team and year
National team	Year	Apps	Goals
Syria	2019	12	1
Syria	2020	2	0
Syria	2021	6	1
Syria	2022	1	0
Total		21	2

Scores and results list Syria's goal totally first.

No.	Date	Venue	Opponent	Score	Result	Competition
1	19 November 2019	Maktoum bin Rashid Al Maktoum Stadium, Dubai, United Arab Emirates	Philippines	1–0	1–0	2022 FIFA World Cup qualification
2	30 November 2021	Stadium 974, Doha, Qatar	United Arab Emirates	1–2	1–2	2021 FIFA Arab Cup
