= Ablaye Sy =

Mauritanian footballer (born 1994)

Personal information
- Full name: Ablaye Sy
- Date of birth: 21 August 1994 (age 32)
- Place of birth: Nouadhibou, Mauritania
- Height: 1.88 m (6 ft 2 in)
- Position: Defender

Youth career
- Nouadhibou

Senior career*
Years	Team	Apps	(Gls)
2015–2020	Nouadhibou		
2020–2021	Jeddah		
2021–2022	Al-Ansar		
2022–2024	Al-Taawon		
2024	Al Arabi		

International career
2018–	Mauritania	3	(0)
- * Club domestic league appearances and goals

Ablaye Sy (born 21 August 1994) is a Mauritanian professional footballer plays as a defender for the Mauritania national team.

On 27 July 2021, Sy joined Al-Ansar.
