= Kamel Hmeisheh =

Syrian footballer (born 1998)

Personal information
- Full name: Kamel Hmeisheh
- Date of birth: 1 January 1998 (age 28)
- Place of birth: Latakia, Syria
- Height: 1.74 m (5 ft 9 in)
- Position: Defensive midfielder

Team information
- Current team: Masafi Al-Wasat

Senior career*
Years	Team	Apps	(Gls)
2017–2022	Tishreen		(8)
2022–2023	Al-Karkh		
2023–2024	Al-Ahli Manama		
2024	Tishreen		
2024–	Masafi Al-Wasat		

International career^{‡}
2019–2020	Syria U23	6	(0)
2019–	Syria	27	(0)
- * Club domestic league appearances and goals as of 18:36, 14 July 2021 (UTC) ‡ National team caps and goals as of 6 September 2023

Kamel Hmeisheh (Arabic: كامل حميشة; born 1 January 1998) is a Syrian footballer who plays as a defensive midfielder for Masafi Al-Wasat and the Syria national team.

== Club career ==
On 26 June 2018, Tishreen renewed Hmeisheh's contract. On 29 January 2020, Hmeisheh suffered a sprained ankle and was on the sidelines for three weeks. After helping Tishreen win the league title in 2019–20, Hmeishe's contract was renewed for a further season on 6 September 2020.

In January 2022, Hmeisheh joined Iraqi Premier League side Al-Kharkh. On 6 August 2023, he moved to Al-Ahli Manama in the Bahraini Premier League.

== International career ==
Hmeisheh represented Syria internationally at under-23 level, playing at the 2020 AFC U-23 Championship. He was first called up to the senior team on 5 September 2019, making his debut in a 2022 FIFA World Cup qualification match against the Philippines.

== Honours ==
Tishreen

- Syrian Premier League: 2019–20, 2020–21

Al-Karkh

- Iraq FA Cup: 2021–22
