= Amro Jenyat =

Syrian footballer (born 1993)

Personal information
- Full name: Amro Jenyat
- Date of birth: 15 January 1993 (age 33)
- Place of birth: Homs, Syria
- Height: 1.70 m (5 ft 7 in)
- Positions: Right-back; winger

Team information
- Current team: Al-Wahda (Syria)

Youth career
- Al-Karamah

Senior career*
Years	Team	Apps	(Gls)
2011–2016	Al-Karamah		(12)
2013	→ Al-Muhafaza (loan)		
2014–2015	→ Al-Shabab (loan)		
2016–2017	Al-Shabab		(3)
2017–2018	Dhofar		(1)
2018–2019	Al-Shabab		(7)
2019–2020	Al-Wahda		
2020	Mesaimeer		
2020–2022	Al-Karamah		(7)
2021	→ Ahed (loan)	0	(0)
2022	Al-Manama		
2022–2023	Al-Karamah		
2023-	Al-Wahda SC (Syria)	0	(0)

International career^{‡}
2011–2012	Syria U20		
2012–2016	Syria U23		
2014–	Syria	45	(1)
- * Club domestic league appearances and goals as of 14:01, 14 May 2021 (UTC) ‡ National team caps and goals as of 8 January 2024

Amro Jenyat (Arabic: عَمْرو جَنيَات; born 15 January 1993) is a Syrian professional footballer who plays as a right-back or a winger for Al-Karamah and the Syria national team.

== Personal life ==
Jenyat is the younger brother of Syrian national team player Aatef.

== Club career ==
Jenyat started his career with Al-Karamah. On 20 August 2014, he signed with Omani club Al-Shabab Club. He made his Oman Professional League debut on 11 September 2014 in a 2–2 draw against Bowsher Club.

In January 2020, Jenyat joined Qatari club Mesaimeer. He returned to Al-Karamah in September 2020. On 14 May 2021, Jenyat moved to Lebanese Premier League side Ahed on a free transfer, to play in the 2021 AFC Cup.

== International career ==
Jenyat played for the Syria under-20 national team. He played for Syria at the 2019 AFC Asian Cup.

Jenyat scored his first international goal on 9 November 2016 in a friendly match against Singapore at the Tuanku Abdul Rahman Stadium, which ended in a 2–0 victory.

== Career statistics ==
=== International ===
Scores and results list Syria's goal tally first, score column indicates score after each Jenyat goal.

List of international goals scored by Amro Jenyat
No.	Date	Venue	Opponent	Score	Result	Competition	Ref.
1	9 November 2016	Tuanku Abdul Rahman Stadium, Paroi, Malaysia	Singapore	1–0	2–0	Friendly	
