= Taoufik Mehedhebi =

Tunisian footballer

Personal information
- Full name: Taoufik Mehedhebi
- Date of birth: 13 December 1965 (age 60)
- Place of birth: Ben Arous, Tunisia
- Position: Midfielder

Senior career*
Years	Team	Apps	(Gls)
- Stade Tunisien

International career
- Tunisia
- * Club domestic league appearances and goals

Taoufik Mehedhebi (born 13 December 1965) is a Tunisian former footballer who played for the national team as a midfielder. He competed in the men's tournament at the 1988 Summer Olympics.
