= Tahnoon Al-Zaabi =

Emirati professional footballer (born 1999)

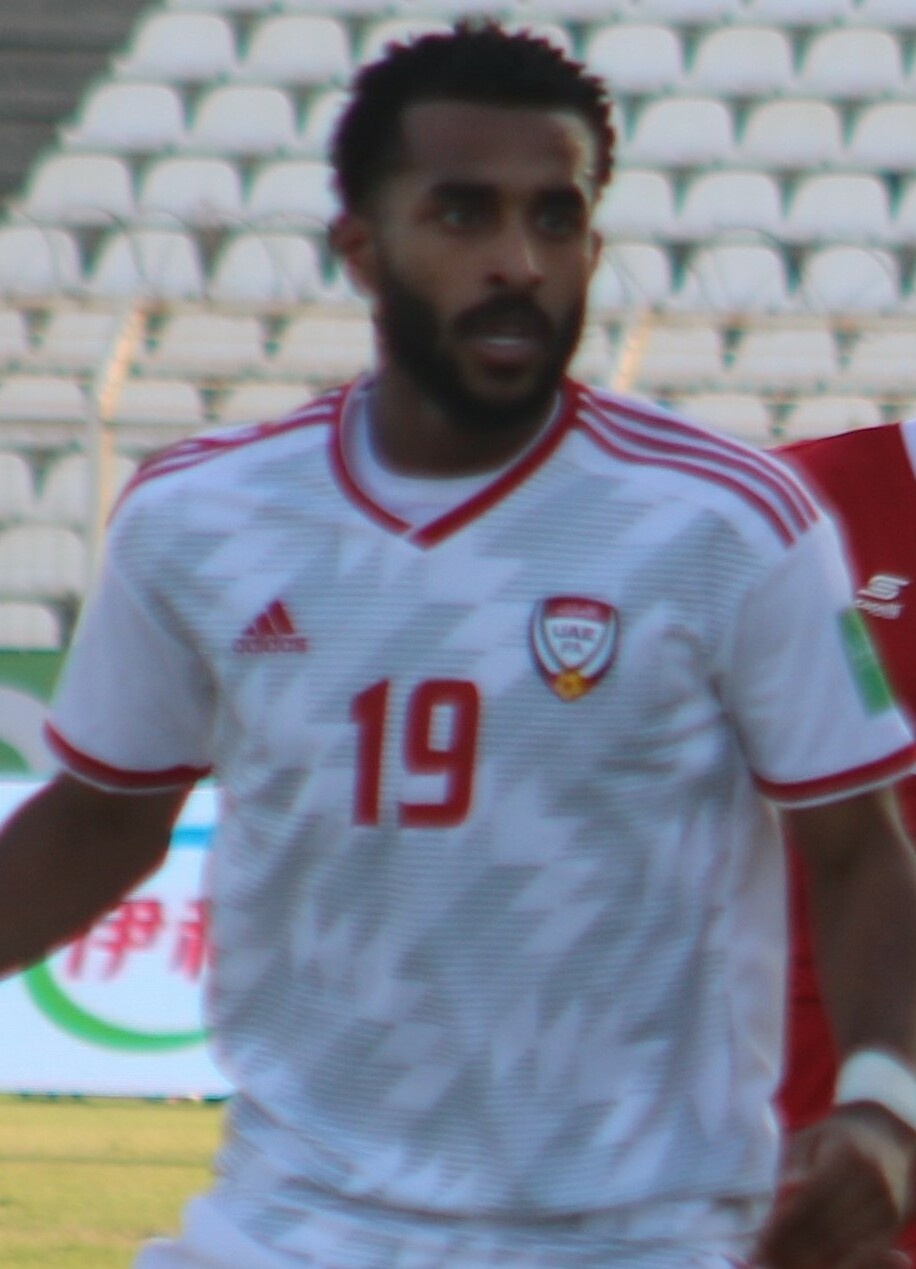
- Al-Zaabi in 2021

Personal information
- Birth name: Tahnoon Hamdan Saeed Salem Salmeen Al-Badal Al-Zaabi
- Date of birth: 10 April 1999 (age 27)
- Place of birth: Abu Dhabi, UAE
- Height: 1.67 m (5 ft 5 1/2 in)
- Position: Attacking midfielder

Team information
- Current team: Al Wasl
- Number: 8

Youth career
- Al Wahda

Senior career*
Years	Team	Apps	(Gls)
2018–2024	Al Wahda	101	(5)
2024–	Al Wasl	0	(0)

International career^{‡}
2018	United Arab Emirates U19	2	(0)
2020	United Arab Emirates U23	2	(0)
2020–	United Arab Emirates	38	(1)
- * Club domestic league appearances and goals as of 8 April 2026 (UTC) ‡ National team caps and goals as of 19:37, 28 January 2024 (UTC)

Tahnoon Al-Zaabi (Arabic: طَحْنُونُ حَمْدَانُ سَعِيدُ سَالِمُ سَالِمِينُ الْبَدَّالُ الزَّعَابِيُّ; born 10 April 1999) is an Emirati professional footballer who plays as an attacking midfielder for Al Wasl and the United Arab Emirates national team.

== Career ==
A youth product of Al Wahda, Al-Zaabi as promoted to their senior team in the UAE Pro League in 2018. On 6 December 2019, he signed his first professional contract with the club until 2022. On 4 February 2022, he extended his contract with Al-Wahda until 2026.

== International ==
He debuted for the United Arab Emirates national team in a 2–1 friendly loss to Uzbekistan on 12 October 2020. He was called up to the national team for the 2023 AFC Asian Cup.

=== International ===
Scores and results list the United Arab Emirates' goal tally first, score column indicates score after each Al-Zaabi goal.

List of international goals scored by Tahnoon Al-Zaabi
No.	Date	Venue	Opponent	Score	Result	Competition
1	12 October 2023	Al Maktoum Stadium, Dubai, United Arab Emirates	Kuwait	1–0	1–0	Friendly

== Personal life ==
Al-Zaabi's father Hamdan Al-Zaabi was a basketball player in the UAE, and his brother Mohammed Al-Zaabi is also a professional footballer.
