= Muayad Al Khouli =

Syrian footballer (born 1993)

Personal information
- Full name: Muayad Aref Al Khouli
- Date of birth: 16 October 1993 (age 33)
- Place of birth: Douma, Syria
- Height: 1.76 m (5 ft 9 in)
- Positions: Centre back; right back

Team information
- Current team: Sohar

Senior career*
Years	Team	Apps	(Gls)
2011–2015	Al-Jaish		
2015–2016	Al-Talaba SC		
2016–2017	Al-Jaish		
2017–2018	Al-Wahda		
2018–2019	Al-Najma		
2019	Al-Ittihad		
2019–2021	Al-Wahda		
2021	Hutteen		
2021–2022	Al-Nasr		
2022–2023	Tishreen		
2023–2024	Al-Jaish		
2024–2025	Al-Wathba		
2025–	Sohar		

International career^{‡}
2009–2010	Syria U-17		
2011–2012	Syria U-20		
2013–2016	Syria U-23		
2018–	Syria	16	(0)
- * Club domestic league appearances and goals ‡ National team caps and goals as of 9 September 2024

Muayad Aref Al Khouli (Arabic: مؤيد عريف الخولي) (born 16 October 1993), also spelt Moaiad Alkhouli, is a Syrian professional footballer.

He started his career at Al-Wathba, which competes in the Syrian Premier League, the top division in Syria, in 2011. He remained at the club until 2015. In November–December 2021, Alkhouli played for Al Nasr SCSC, in the FIFA Arab Cup.
