= Mohammed Al-Attas =

Emirati footballer (born 1997)

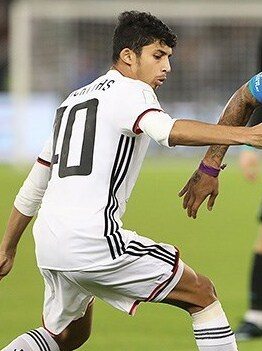

Personal information
- Full name: Mohammed Omar Zain Mohsen Al-Attas Al-Hashmi
- Date of birth: 5 August 1997 (age 29)
- Place of birth: Abu Dhabi, United Arab Emirates
- Height: 1.79 m (5 ft 10 in)
- Position: Centre back

Team information
- Current team: Al Jazira
- Number: 6

Youth career
- Al Jazira

Senior career*
| Years | Team | Apps | (Gls) |
| 2016– | Al Jazira | 111 | (1) |

International career
| 2019– | United Arab Emirates | 33 | (1) |
- * Club domestic league appearances and goals

Mohammed Omar Al-Attas (Arabic: مُحَمَّد عُمَر زَيْن مُحْسِن الْعَطَّاس الهَاشِمِي, born 5 August 1997) is an Emirati footballer who plays for Al Jazira as a centre back.

== International career ==
On 4 January 2024, Al-Attas was named in the UAE's squad for the 2023 AFC Asian Cup.

=== International goals ===
Scores and results list the United Arab Emirates' goal tally first.

| No. | Date | Venue | Opponent | Score | Result | Competition |
|---|---|---|---|---|---|---|
| 1. | 30 August 2019 | Bahrain National Stadium, Riffa | Dominican Republic | 1–0 | 4–0 | Friendly |
