= Rafael Foltyn =

German football referee

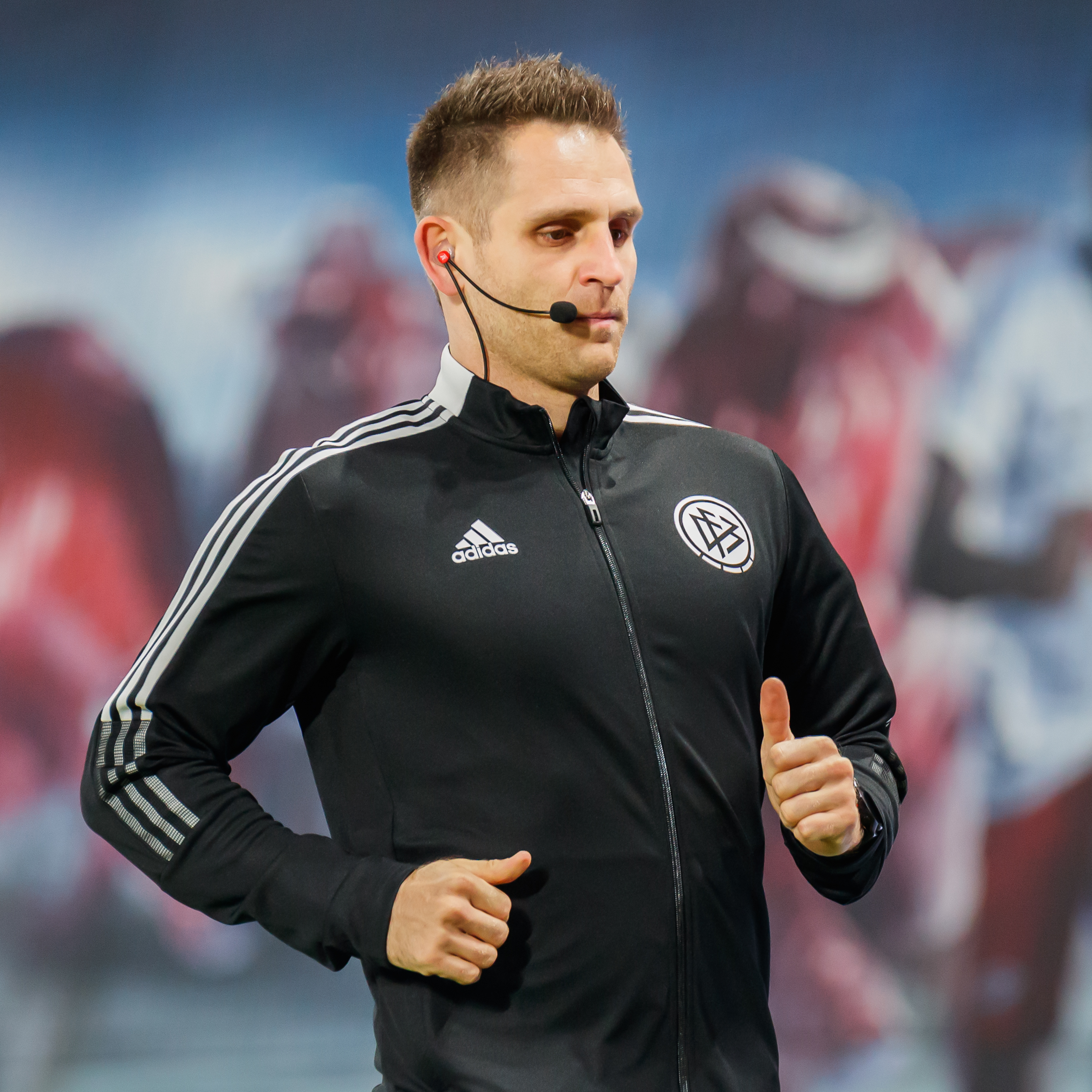
- Rafael Foltyn, 2021
- Born: 21 June 1985 (age 41); West Germany

Domestic
Years	League	Role
2008–	Regionalliga	Referee
2010–	2. Bundesliga	Assistant referee
2012–	Bundesliga	Assistant referee

International
Years	League	Role
2016–	UEFA	Assistant referee
2019–	FIFA	Assistant referee

Rafael Foltyn (born 21 June 1985) is a German football referee.

Rafael Foltyn lives in Mainz-Kastel. He is a DFB referee for TSG Kastel 1846. During the 2008/09 to 2011/12 seasons, he refereed games in the North, West and South Regional Football Leagues. He later specialized as an assistant referee.

As a linesman, Foltyn has been involved in the 2. Bundesliga games since the 2010–11 season and the Bundesliga games since the 2012–13 season. Since the 2015–16 season, he has been a linesman of the UEFA Europa League, and the UEFA Champions League.

In April 2021, he was nominated along with Jan Seidel to be part of Daniel Siebert’s team of referees for the UEFA Euro 2020 in June and July 2021.

In May 2022, he was once again nominated together with Jan Seidel to be part of Daniel Siebert's refereeing team for the 2022 FIFA World Cup in November and December 2022.
