= Oliver Kass Kawo =

Syrian footballer (born 2001)

Personal information
- Full name: Oliver Isak Kass Kawo
- Date of birth: 3 December 2001 (age 24)
- Place of birth: Barkarby, Järfälla, Sweden
- Height: 1.86 m (6 ft 1 in)
- Position: Midfielder

Team information
- Current team: FF Jaro
- Number: 8

Youth career
- 2019–2020: Vasalunds IF

Senior career*
Years	Team	Apps	(Gls)
2017–2018	Hallonbergens IF	17	(1)
2021–2022	FC Järfälla	15	(2)
2022–2023	Helsingør	8	(0)
2023	Dalkurd	10	(0)
2024–2025	IFK Haninge	53	(8)
2026–	FF Jaro	25	(1)

International career^{‡}
2021–2023	Syria U23	11	(1)
2021–2023	Syria	8	(1)
- * Club domestic league appearances and goals as of 13 November 2026 ‡ National team caps and goals as of 12 September 2023

Oliver Isak Kass Kawo (Arabic: أوليفر إيساك كاسكاو; born 3 December 2001) is a footballer who plays as a midfielder for Finnish club FF Jaro. Born in Sweden, he has played for the Syria national team.

== Early life ==
Kass Kawo was born in Sweden to a Syrian father from Al-Hasakah, and a Swedish mother. He began playing football aged five.

== Club career ==
In March 2021, Kass Kawo left Vasalunds IF to join FC Järfälla. On 1 February 2022, he signed a deal until June 2024 with Danish 1st Division club FC Helsingør after a trial period.

== International career ==
Having represented Syria internationally at under-23 level, Kass Kawo made his senior debut on 30 November 2021, in a 2021 FIFA Arab Cup game against the United Arab Emirates. He scored his first international goal on 3 December, on his 20th birthday, helping Syria beat Tunisia 2–0 in the same competition.

== Style of play ==
Kass Kawo is a versatile forward capable of playing in multiple offensive positions.

== Career statistics ==
=== International ===
As of match played 3 December 2021
Scores and results list Syria's goal totally first, score column indicates score after each Kass Kawo goal.

List of international goals scored by Oliver Kass Kawo
No.	Date	Venue	Opponent	Score	Result	Competition
1	3 December 2021	Al Bayt Stadium, Al Khor, Qatar	Tunisia	1–0	2–0	2021 FIFA Arab Cup

== Honours ==
Syria U23

- AFC U-23 Asian Cup third place: 2022
