= Mahmoud Khamees =

Emirati footballer (born 1987)

Personal information
- Full name: Mahmoud Khamis Saeed Khamis Al-Hammadi
- Date of birth: 28 October 1987 (age 39)
- Place of birth: Abu Dhabi, United Arab Emirates
- Height: 1.71 m (5 ft 7 in)
- Position: Left back

Senior career*
Years	Team	Apps	(Gls)
2008–2014	Al-Wahda	86	(4)
2014–2022	Al-Nasr	148	(9)
2022	→ Al-Wahda (loan)	19	(0)
2022–2024	Al-Wahda	10	(0)

International career^{‡}
2008–	United Arab Emirates	54	(2)
- * Club domestic league appearances and goals as of 4 January 2020 ‡ National team caps and goals as of 4 January 2020

Mahmoud Khamees Al-Hammadi (born 28 October 1987) is an association football player from the United Arab Emirates who plays as a left back.

== International career ==
He made his debut in a friendly defeat to Benin in November 2007, playing the entire game. He was included into the 2011 AFC Asian Cup squad, made his debut in the match against Iraq for only 16 minutes as the UAE lost 0–1 in injury time.

He scored his first international goal against Lebanon in the third round of 2014 FIFA World Cup qualification, but the UAE lost 1–3 and eventually failed to qualify for the 2014 FIFA World Cup. It took him a decade before he scored his second international goal, a 3–2 win over Vietnam in the 2022 FIFA World Cup qualification, which sent both teams into the third round.

=== Goals ===
#	Date	Venue	Opponent	Score	Result	Competition
1.	6 September 2011	Camille Chamoun Sports City Stadium, Beirut, Lebanon	Lebanon	1–0	1–3	2014 FIFA World Cup qualification
2.	15 June 2021	Zabeel Stadium, Dubai, United Arab Emirates	Vietnam	3–0	3–2	2022 FIFA World Cup qualification
