= Mouhamad Anez =

Syrian footballer (born 1995)

Personal information
- Full name: Mouhamad Anez
- Date of birth: 14 May 1995 (age 31)
- Place of birth: Al-Hasakah, Syria
- Height: 1.70 m (5 ft 7 in)
- Position: Midfielder

Team information
- Current team: Diyala

Senior career*
Years	Team	Apps	(Gls)
2015–2017	Al-Jazeera		(3)
2017–2019	Al-Jaish		(4)
2019–2021	Al-Ittihad Aleppo		(1)
2021	Al-Karamah	0	(0)
2021–2022	Riffa		
2022–2023	Al-Zawraa		
2023	Al-Khaldiya		
2023–2024	Al-Riffa		
2024–2025	Hutteen		
2025	Al-Arabi	15	(0)
2025–2026	Al Ahed	10	(1)
2026	Borneo Samarinda	10	(0)
2026–	Diyala		

International career^{‡}
2017–2018	Syria U23	4	(0)
2019–	Syria	40	(1)
- * Club domestic league appearances and goals as of 11 May 2026 ‡ National team caps and goals as of 11 December 2025

Mouhamad Anez (Arabic: محمد عنز; born 14 May 1995) is a Syrian professional footballer who plays as a midfielder for Diyala and the Syria national team.

== Club career ==
Having played for Al-Jaish, Anez joined Al-Ittihad Aleppo on 1 September 2019. Following the 2020–21 Syrian Premier League, he left Al-Ittihad after his contract's expiration.

Anez moved to Al-Karamah in summer 2021, but was promptly allowed to join Bahraini Premier League club Riffa, as "it was agreed that the player would leave, in the event that he received an offer from abroad before the start of the league".

On 20 August 2025, Anez joined Ahed in the Lebanese Premier League.

== International career ==
Having represented Syria internationally at under-23 level, Anez made his senior debut on 8 July 2019, in a friendly against North Korea.

He scored his first international goal on 3 December 2021, helping Syria beat Tunisia 2–0 at the Al Bayt Stadium in the 2021 FIFA Arab Cup.

== Career statistics ==
=== International ===
As of match played 3 December 2021
Scores and results list Syria's goal totally first, score column indicates score after each Anez goal.

List of international goals scored by Mouhamad Anez
No.	Date	Venue	Opponent	Score	Result	Competition	Ref.
1	3 December 2021	Al Bayt Stadium, Al Khor, Qatar	Tunisia	2–0	2–0	2021 FIFA Arab Cup	
