= Ali Salmeen =

Emirati footballer (born 1995)

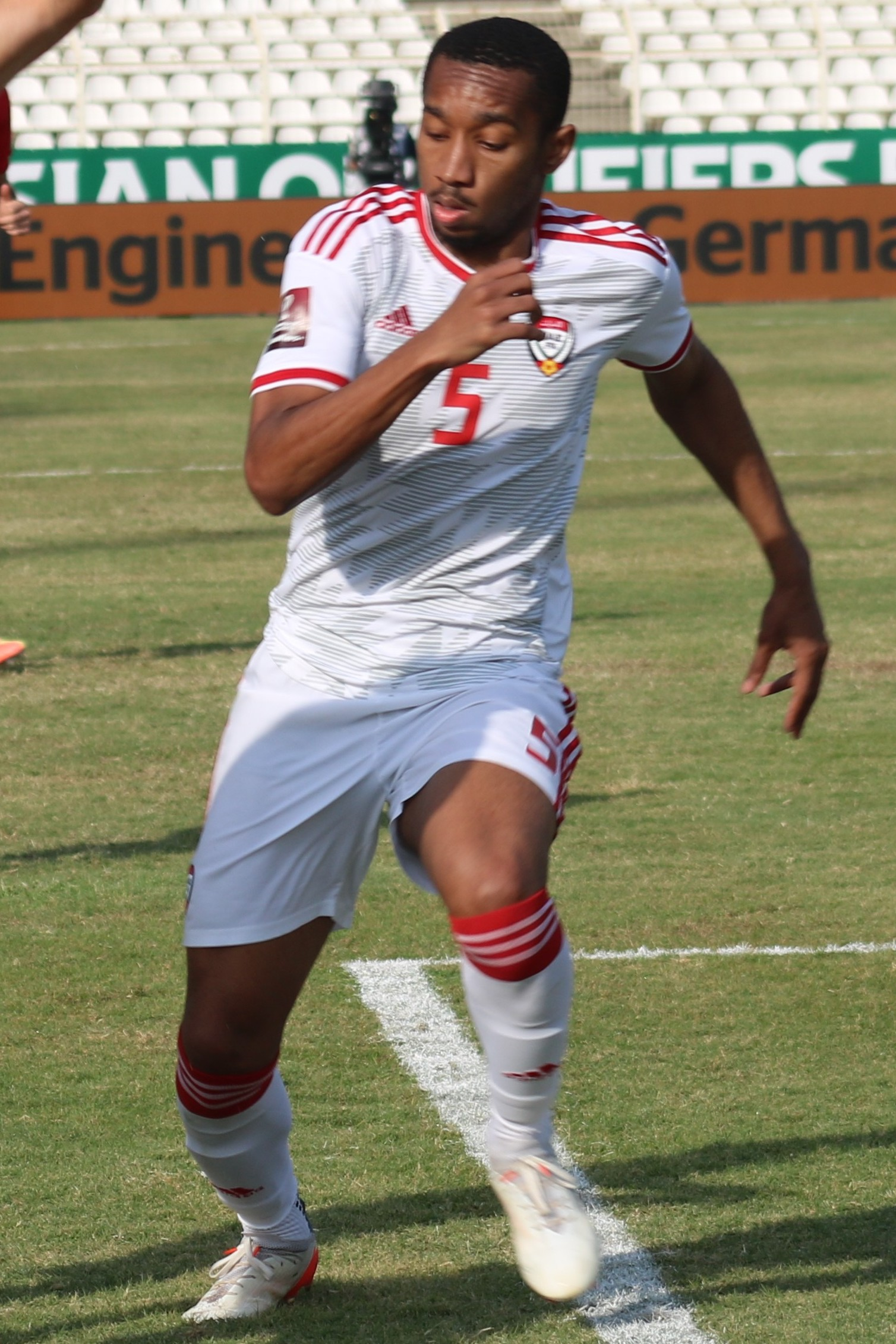
- Salmeen with the United Arab Emirates in 2021

Personal information
- Full name: Ali Hassan Ali Salmeen Al-Bloushi
- Date of birth: 4 February 1995 (age 31)
- Place of birth: Dubai, United Arab Emirates
- Height: 1.72 m (5 ft 8 in)
- Position: Defensive midfielder

Team information
- Current team: Kalba
- Number: 5

Youth career
- Al-Wasl

Senior career*
Years	Team	Apps	(Gls)
2013–2025	Al-Wasl	181	(5)
2025	→ Kalba (loan)	11	(1)
2025–	Kalba	2	(0)

International career^{‡}
2014–2024	United Arab Emirates	63	(3)
- * Club domestic league appearances and goals ‡ National team caps and goals as of 7 December 2025

Ali Hassan Salmeen (Arabic: عَلِيّ حَسَن عَلِيّ سَالِمَيْن الْبَلُوشِيّ; born 4 February 1995) is an Emirati professional footballer who plays for Kalba and the United Arab Emirates national team.

== International career ==
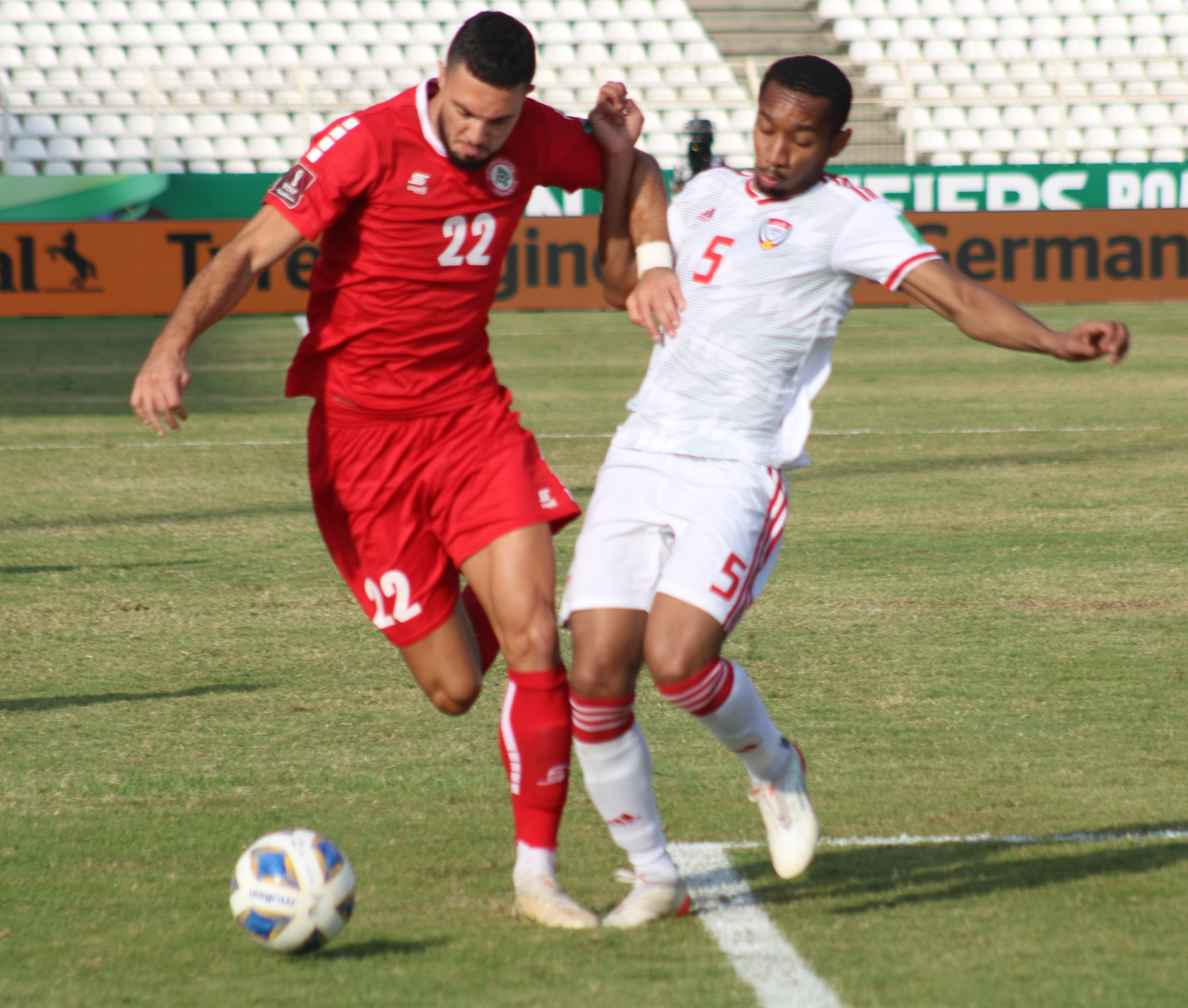
Salmeen with the United Arab Emirates vs Lebanon at November 2021

On 4 January 2024, Salmeen was named in the UAE's squad for the 2023 AFC Asian Cup.

=== International goals ===
Score and result list United Arab Emirates' goal tally first.

No.	Date	Venue	Opponent	Score	Result	Competition
1.	20 November 2018	Zabeel Stadium, Dubai, United Arab Emirates	Yemen	2–0	2–0	Friendly
2.	15 June 2021	Zabeel Stadium, Dubai, United Arab Emirates	Vietnam	1–0	3–2	2022 FIFA World Cup qualification
3.	12 September 2023	Maksimir Stadium, Zagreb, Croatia	Costa Rica	3–0	4–1	Friendly
