= Mondher Kebaier =

Tunisian footballer and coach

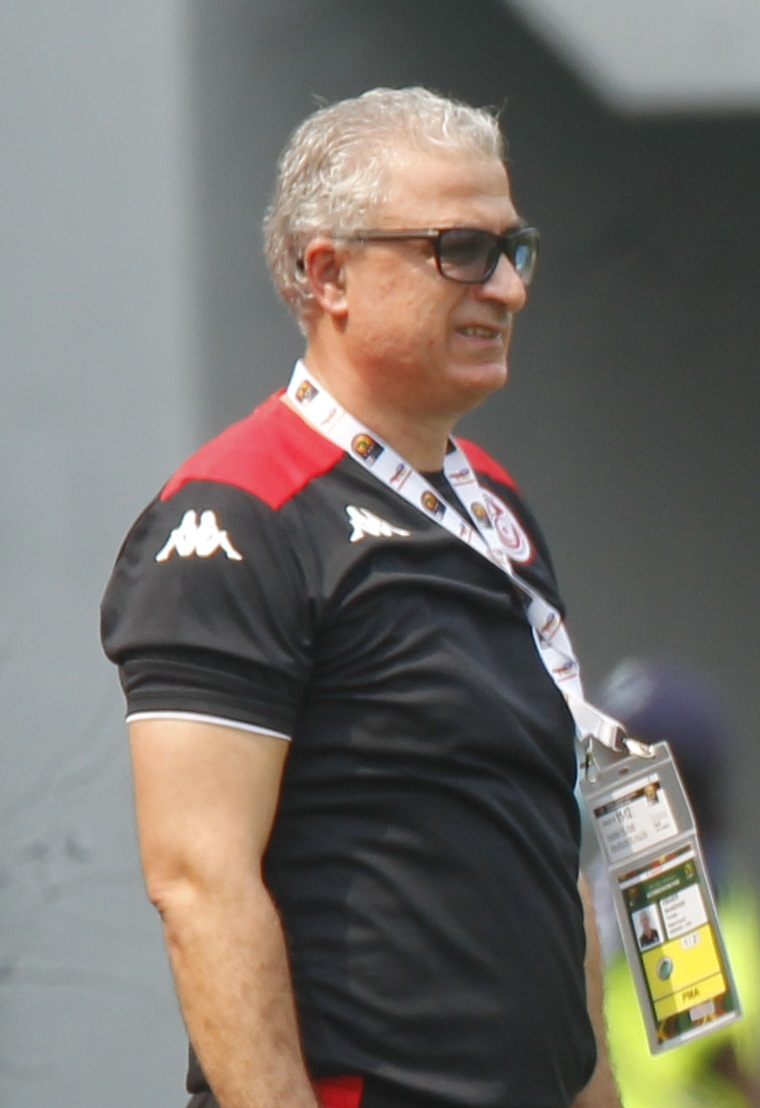

Personal information
- Date of birth: 2 April 1970 (age 56)
- Place of birth: Bizerte, Tunisia
- Position: Defender

Senior career*
Years	Team	Apps	(Gls)
- CA Bizertin

Managerial career
- AS Djerba
- CA Bizertin
- 2004–2005: AS Kasserine
- 2010–2011: Étoile du Sahel
- 2012–2013: Étoile du Sahel
- 2013: CA Bizertin
- 2014: Club Africain
- 2014–2016: AS Marsa
- 2018: Espérance de Tunis
- 2019–2022: Tunisia
- 2022–2024: Raja CA
- 2024: Club Africain
- 2026: CS Constantine
Medal record
Men's football
Representing Tunisia (as manager)
FIFA Arab Cup
Runner-up	2021
- * Club domestic league appearances and goals

Mondher Kebaier (Arabic: منذر الكبير; born 2 April 1970) is a Tunisian football coach and former player.

== Career ==
Formerly a player at hometown club CA Bizertin, Kebaier became manager of the club in 2000, following a spell at AS Djerba that began in 1998. He thus moved to AS Kasserine, before joining Étoile du Sahel for two spells, beginning in 2010. In 2013, Kebaier rejoined Bizertin, winning the 2013 Tunisian Cup.

In 2014, Kebaier joined Club Africain, before moving to AS Marsa in the same year, departing in 2016. In 2016, he joined Espérance de Tunis as a youth coach, managing the club for a month at the start of 2018.

In August 2019, Kebaier was appointed manager of Tunisia on a three-year contract, replacing the outgoing Alain Giresse.

On 24 September 2022, he was appointed as new coach of Raja Club Athletic after the early departure of his compatriot Faouzi Benzarti.

He became manager of Club Africain in February 2024.

On 2 July 2026, Kebaier was appointed manager of Algerian club CS Constantine. On 18 October 2026, he was sacked due to bad results.

== Honours ==
=== Managerial ===
CA Bizertin

- Tunisian Cup: 2012–13
