= Firas Ben Larbi =

Tunisian footballer (born 1996)

Firas Larbi
Personal information
- Full name: Mohamed Firas Ben Larbi
- Date of birth: 27 May 1996 (age 30)
- Place of birth: Tunisia
- Height: 1.71 m (5 ft 7 in)
- Position: Midfielder

Team information
- Current team: Hatta
- Number: 11

Youth career
- –2014: Marsa

Senior career*
Years	Team	Apps	(Gls)
2014–2016	Marsa	19	(0)
2016–2018	Bizertin	34	(8)
2018–2021	Étoile du Sahel	37	(11)
2020–2021	→ Fujairah (loan)	23	(7)
2021–2023	Ajman	51	(24)
2023–2026	Al-Sharjah	62	(12)
2026–	Hatta	2	(2)

International career^{‡}
2013	Tunisia U17	6	(2)
2019–	Tunisia	13	(3)
Medal record
Representing Tunisia
Men's football
FIFA Arab Cup
Runner-up	2021 Qatar
- * Club domestic league appearances and goals as of 07:57, 23 August 2026 (UTC) ‡ National team caps and goals as of 22:00, 21 November 2023 (UTC)

Mohamed Firas Ben Larbi (Arabic: مُحَمَّد فِرَاس بِالعَرَبِيّ; born 27 May 1996) is a Tunisian professional footballer who plays as a midfielder for Hatta. He has represented Tunisia at senior international level.

== Club career ==
Firas began his senior career Marsa and also played for Bizertin and Étoile du Sahel in the Tunisian Ligue Professionnelle 1. In August 2020, he joined UAE Pro League side Fujairah on loan, scoring on his league debut for the club in a 4–2 loss to Sharjah.

== Career statistics ==
=== Club ===
As of match played 16 December 2023

Club	Season	League			National cup (Note: Includes Moroccan Throne Cup, UAE President's Cup)		League cup (Note: Includes UAE League Cup)		Continental		Other		Total	
Club	Season	Division	Apps	Goals	Apps	Goals	Apps	Goals	Apps	Goals	Apps	Goals	Apps	Goals
Marsa	2013–14	TLP1	6	0	0	0	–		–		–		6	0
Marsa	2014–15	TLP1	8	0	0	0	–		–		–		8	0
Marsa	2015–16	TLP1	5	0	1	1	–		–		–		6	1
Marsa	Total		19	0	1	1	–		–		–		20	1
Bizertin	2016–17	TLP1	11	1	0	0	–		–		–		11	1
Bizertin	2017–18	TLP1	23	7	4	0	–		–		–		27	7
Bizertin	Total		34	8	4	0	–		–		–		38	8
ESS	2018–19	TLP1	22	6	3	1	–		12 (Note: 8 Appearances & 1 goal in CAF Confederation Cup,4 Appearances & no goals in CAF Champions League)	1	1 (Note: Appearances in Arab Club Champions Cup)	1	38	9
ESS	2019–20	TLP1	15	5	1	0	–		4 (Note: Appearances in CAF Champions League)	2	–		20	7
ESS	Total		37	11	4	1	–		16	3	1	1	58	16
Fujairah	2020–21	UPL	23	7	1	0	3	1	0	0	–		27	8
Ajman	2021–22	UPL	25	12	1	0	3	2	0	0	–		29	14
Ajman	2022–23	UPL	26	12	5	4	2	0	0	0	0	0	33	16
Ajman	Total		51	24	6	4	5	2	0	0	0	0	62	30
Sharjah	2023–24	UPL	8	2	0	0	1	0	4	1	–		13	3
Career total			172	52	16	6	9	3	20	4	1	1	218	66

== International career ==
Firas was part of the Tunisia U17 squad who competed in the 2013 FIFA U-17 World Cup, having earlier in the year competed for the same side in the 2013 African U-17 Championship. In September 2019, he was called up to the senior Tunisia squad for the first time, for their 2020 African Nations Championship qualification matches against Libya, of which he played in both matches.

=== International goals ===
Scores and results list Tunisia's goal tally first.

Goal	Date	Venue	Opponent	Score	Result	Competition
1.	30 November 2021	Ahmed bin Ali Stadium, Al Rayyan, Qatar	Mauritania	2–0	5–1	2021 FIFA Arab Cup
2.	30 November 2021	Ahmed bin Ali Stadium, Al Rayyan, Qatar	Mauritania	4–1	5–1	2021 FIFA Arab Cup
3.	17 November 2023	Hammadi Agrebi Stadium, Tunis, Tunisia	São Tomé and Príncipe	4–0	4–0	2026 FIFA World Cup qualification

== Honours ==
Sharjah

- AFC Champions League Two: 2024–25

Tunisia

- Kirin Cup Soccer: 2022
