= Bilel Ifa =

Tunisian footballer

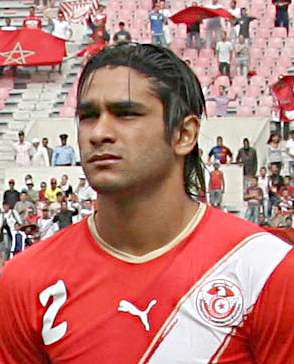
- Ifa with Tunisia in 2010.

Personal information
- Full name: Bilel Ifa
- Date of birth: 9 March 1990 (age 36)
- Place of birth: Ariana, Tunisia
- Height: 1.85 m (6 ft 1 in)
- Position: Centre-back

Senior career*
Years	Team	Apps	(Gls)
2007–2022	Club Africain	209	(14)
2022	Abha	11	(1)
2022–2024	Kuwait		
2024	→ Al-Shabab (loan)		
2024–2025	Erbil	15	(0)
2025	Olympic Azzaweya		

International career
2008–2022	Tunisia	36	(0)
Medal record
Representing Tunisia
Men's football
FIFA Arab Cup
Runner-up	2021 Qatar
- * Club domestic league appearances and goals as of 13:29, 18 February 2026 (UTC)

Bilel Ifa (Arabic: بلال العيفة; born 9 March 1990) is a Tunisian professional footballer who plays as a centre-back.

== Club career ==
Born in Ariana, Ifa has played club football for Club Africain, Abha, Kuwait, Al-Shabab, Erbil and Olympic Azzaweya.

On 12 January 2022, Ifa joined Saudi Arabian club Abha.

On 1 September 2022, Ifa joined Kuwait on a one-year deal.

== International career ==
He made his international debut for Tunisia in 2008.
