= Stadium 974 =

Football stadium in Doha, Qatar

- استاد ٩٧٤ (Arabic)
- Exterior view in December 2022
- Interactive map of Stadium 974
- Former names: Ras Abu Aboud Stadium
- Location: Ras Abu Aboud 7HQ8+JG2; Doha, Qatar
- Coordinates: 25°17′24″N 51°33′54″E
- Capacity: 44,089
- Surface: Grass
- Record attendance: 44,089 (Poland vs Argentina, 30 November 2022)
- Public transit: Ras Bu Abboud (راس أبو عبود)

Construction
- Opened: 30 November 2021
- Architect: Fenwick Iribarren Architects

Stadium 974 (Arabic: استاد ٩٧٤, romanized: ʾIstād 974, previously known as Ras Abu Aboud Stadium) is a football stadium in Ras Abu Aboud, Doha, Qatar, about 10 kilometres (6.2 mi) south-east of central Doha. The stadium first planned temporary venue in FIFA World Cup history; it officially opened on 30 November 2021. It hosted test matches during the 2021 FIFA Arab Cup and was a landmark venue during the 2022 FIFA World Cup. Originally, the legacy planned to dismantle the stadium and move it to Africa or South America, with the former site to be transformed into a waterfront development. However, as of December 2025, this has not happened and the stadium currently sits in its original site. Most recently, the venue was used for the 2024 FIFA Intercontinental Cup, the 2024 Trophée des Champions and the 2025 FIFA Arab Cup.

== Design and construction ==
Created by Spain's Fenwick Iribarren Architects in collaboration with Schlaich Bergermann Partner, Hilson Moran and Lars Nyström, this stadium utilised repurposed shipping containers and recycled steel, resulting in cost-effective construction and reduced waste. Constructed on a 450,000 square-metre (111-acre) waterfront site, it has a modular design and incorporates parts of 974 recycled shipping containers in homage to the site's strategic location, industrial history and the international dialing code for Qatar (+974).

The construction of the stadium involved HBK Contracting Company (HBK), DCB-QA, Time Qatar, Fenwick Iribarren Architects (FI-A), Schlaich Bergermann Partner and Hilson Moran. Fenwick Iribarren Architects said "the idea was to avoid building a "white elephant", a stadium that is left unused or underused after the tournament ends, as happened following previous World Cups."

== History ==
The stadium is one of eight stadiums built, renovated or reconstructed for the 2022 FIFA World Cup. The procurement process for the stadium conversion began in 2017.

The stadium was initially announced under the name Ras Abu Aboud Stadium. During a launch event on 20 November 2021, the venue was officially renamed Stadium 974.

It hosted its first match on 30 November 2021 on the opening day of the 2021 FIFA Arab Cup, between the United Arab Emirates and Syria. The stadium hosted six matches during the tournament.

The stadium hosted seven games in the 2022 FIFA World Cup, including Brazil vs. South Korea in the Round of 16.

== Post-World Cup ==
It was planned that the re-assembled stadium would be transported to a future Host Country nation. It was initially committed to go to Maldonado, Uruguay, where it would be used for the 2030 FIFA World Cup with the vacated land used by the stadium being turned into a waterfront development. However the Uruguay–Argentina–Chile–Paraguay bid did not succeed. Other plans were floated to transport the Stadium to an African nation. However in November 2023, ESPN reported that the stadium is still standing in its original site with its World Cup signage still intact. In December 2024, the stadium hosted two matches of the 2024 FIFA Intercontinental Cup.

On 5 January 2025, the stadium hosted the 2024 Trophée des Champions between Paris Saint-Germain and AS Monaco. The closing match of the 2024–25 Qatar Stars League season in Week 16 between Al Wakrah and Al Rayyan was played in the stadium on 23 February.

== Tournament results ==
All times are local, AST (UTC+3).

=== 2021 FIFA Arab Cup ===
Date	Time	Team #1	Result	Team #2	Round	Attendance
30 November 2021	22:00	United Arab Emirates	2–1	Syria	Group B	4,129
3 December 2021	19:00	Mauritania	0–1	United Arab Emirates	Group B	3,316
4 December 2021	19:00	Sudan	0–5	Egypt	Group D	14,464
7 December 2021	18:00	Jordan	5–1	Palestine	Group C	9,750
15 December 2021	18:00	Tunisia	1–0	Egypt	Semifinals	36,427
18 December 2021	13:00	Egypt	0–0 (a.e.t.) (4–5 p)	Qatar	Third-place play-off	30,978

=== 2022 FIFA World Cup ===
Stadium 974 hosted seven matches during the 2022 FIFA World Cup.

Date	Time	Team No. 1	Result	Team No. 2	Round	Attendance
22 November 2022	19:00	Mexico	0–0	Poland	Group C	39,369
24 November 2022	19:00	Portugal	3–2	Ghana	Group H	42,661
26 November 2022	19:00	France	2–1	Denmark	Group D	42,869
28 November 2022	19:00	Brazil	1–0	Switzerland	Group G	43,649
30 November 2022	22:00	Poland	0–2	Argentina	Group C	44,089
2 December 2022	22:00	Serbia	2–3	Switzerland	Group G	41,378
5 December 2022	22:00	Brazil	4–1	South Korea	Round of 16	43,847

=== 2024 FIFA Intercontinental Cup ===
Stadium 974 hosted two matches for the 2024 FIFA Intercontinental Cup.

Date	Time	Team No. 1	Result	Team No. 2	Round	Attendance
11 December 2024	20:00	(Brazil) Botafogo	0–3	(Mexico) Pachuca	FIFA Derby of the Americas	12,257
14 December 2024	20:00	(Mexico) Pachuca	0–0 (a.e.t.) (6–5 p)	(Egypt) Al Ahly	FIFA Challenger Cup	38,841

=== 2025 FIFA Arab Cup ===
Date	Time	Team #1	Result	Team #2	Round	Attendance
3 December 2025	17:30	Iraq	2–1	Bahrain	Group D	9,358
6 December 2025	19:00	Sudan	0–2	Iraq	Group D	38,639
8 December 2025	20:00	Oman	2–1	Comoros	Group B	9,348
9 December 2025	17:30	United Arab Emirates	3–1	Kuwait	Group C	15,357
