= Al Bayt Stadium =

Football stadium in Al Khor, Qatar

Al-Bayt Stadium
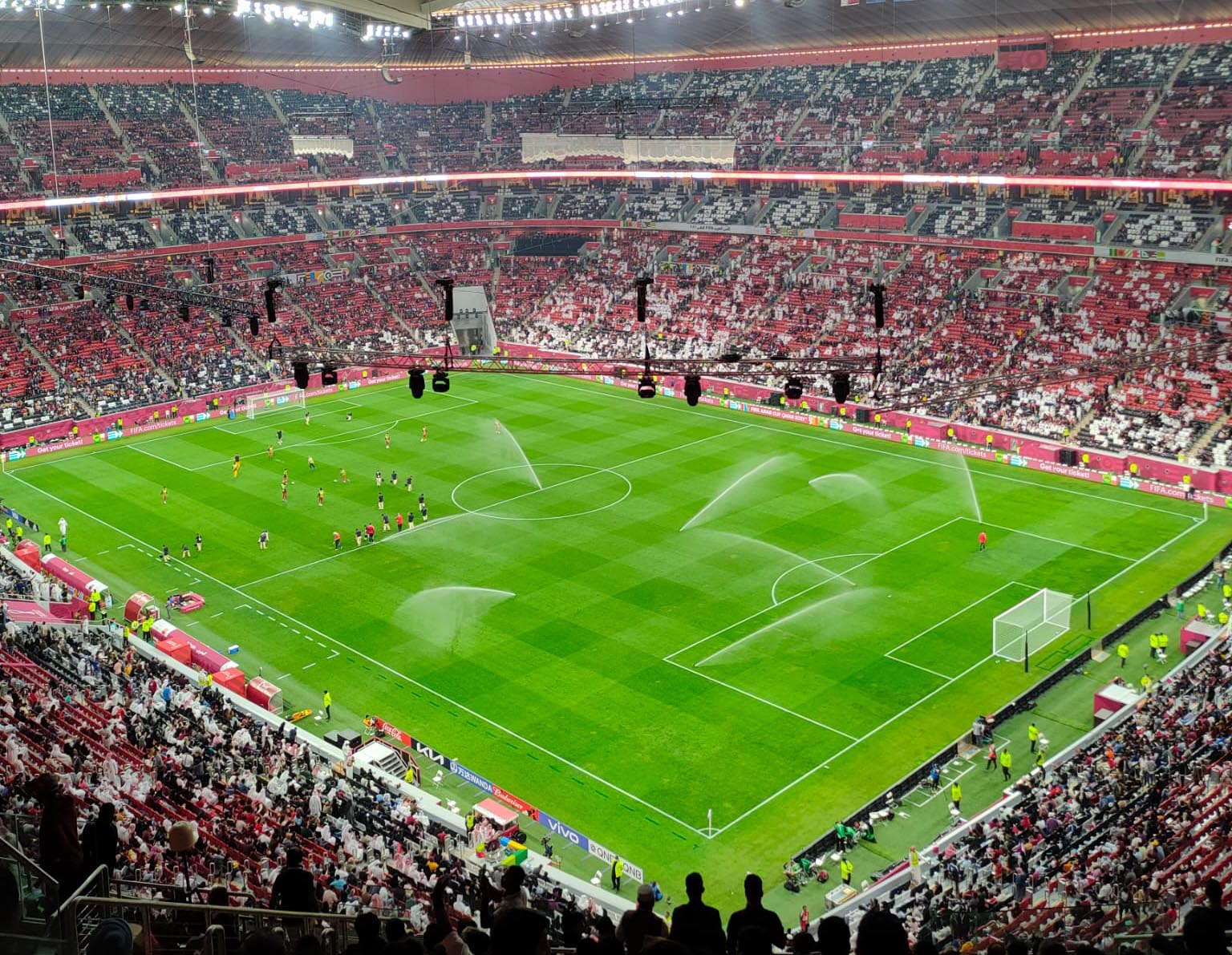
- Interior view in 2021, looking northeast
- Interactive map of Al-Bayt Stadium
- Full name: Al-Bayt Stadium
- Location: Al Khor, Qatar
- Coordinates: 25°39′08″N 51°29′15″E
- Capacity: 68,895
- Roof: Retractable
- Surface: Grass
- Record attendance: 68,895 (Spain vs Germany, 27 November 2022) and (England vs France, 10 December 2022)
- Field size: 105x68 meters

Construction
- Groundbreaking: 2014; 12 years ago
- Opened: 30 November 2021; 4 years ago
- Architects: gmp Architekten von Gerkan, Marg und Partner
- Main contractors: Galfar al-Misnad, Webuild S.p.A., Cimolai

Tenants
- Al-Khor SC (2022–present); Qatar national football team (selected matches)

Al-Bayt Stadium (Arabic: استاد البيت, romanized: ʾIstād al-Bayt, lit. 'The House Stadium') is a retractable roof football stadium in Al Khor, Qatar, which was opened in time for matches in the 2022 FIFA World Cup, which began on 20 November 2022. The stadium is located 35 km (22 mi) away from Doha, which made it the furthest stadium from the capital that was used in the World Cup. The stadium's construction contract was awarded to Qatari contractor Galfar al-Misnad, Webuild S.p.A. and Cimolai in 2015.

== Plans ==
Al Bayt Stadium hosted the opening match of the 2022 World Cup, and hosted a semi-final and a quarter-final match. The stadium hosted around 60,000 World Cup fans (71,000 gross capacity), including 1,000 seats for press. The architectural design takes its inspiration from the traditional tents of the nomadic peoples of Qatar and the region. It features a retractable roof, providing covered seating for all spectators. It connects to transportation systems and has onsite parking for 6,000 cars, 350 buses and the access for 150 public buses/shuttles, as well as 1,000 taxis and water taxis. The stadium is certified for its sustainability credentials under the Global Sustainability Assessment System (GSAS) for a number of certifications representing sustainable design & build, construction management practices and the efficiency of its energy centre. The stadium also received a five-star GSAS rating.

The stadium also includes luxurious hotel suites and rooms with balcony views of the football field.

It was announced that the official opening of the park adjacent to the stadium was to be held as part of celebrations of National Sports Day on 11 February 2020.

== Construction ==
Al Bayt Stadium under construction

The Al Bayt Stadium in Qatar was one of eight stadiums used in the 2022 FIFA World Cup, the second largest after Lusail Stadium. The stadium was designed by Dar Al-Handasah. Following the World Cup, it was originally expected to be reconfigured into a 32,000-seat stadium, with excess seats being removed from the upper tier and donated to other countries or placed on the infrastructure planned for the 2030 Asian Games. The vacated space will then be converted into a five-star hotel, a shopping mall and other sports facilities.

The tent-like structure has four stands, each of whose exterior walls and peaked roofs are covered in polytetrafluoroethylene (PTFE) woven fibreglass membrane. The exterior part of the PTFE membrane is coloured in traditional black, white and red colours to further reference Qatar's nomadic people's tents. A retractable roof connects the four stands to enclose the stadium. In January 2020, the stadium received sustainability certificates of green design, construction management and energy efficiency.

== History ==
View of the stadium in 2020

The inauguration of the stadium took place on 30 November 2021, on the occasion of opening ceremony for the 2021 FIFA Arab Cup, followed by a match between the host Qatar and Bahrain, in which the reigning Asian champion Qatar survived a last-minute scare to fend off the visitor 1–0, courtesy of a header from Abdulaziz Hatem in the 69th minute.

The inauguration was attended by the emir of Qatar, Sheikh Tamim bin Hamad Al Thani, as well as by FIFA President Gianni Infantino, several Heads of State and authorities and Presidents from member associations. The newly built stadium hosted five matches during FIFA Arab Cup 2021, including the final of the tournament on 18 December 2021.

On 20 November 2022, the stadium hosted the opening game of the FIFA World Cup between Qatar and Ecuador; 67,372 were reported to be in attendance at kick-off, despite the capacity of the stadium being 60,000.

== Recent tournament results ==
=== 2021 FIFA Arab Cup ===
The Al Bayt Stadium hosted five matches during the 2021 FIFA Arab Cup, including the final.

Date	Time	Team No. 1	Result	Team No. 2	Round	Attendance
30 November 2021	19:30	Qatar	1–0	Bahrain	Group A	47,813
3 December 2021	22:00	Syria	2–0	Tunisia	Group B	15,913
6 December 2021	22:00	Qatar	3–0	Iraq	Group A	23,008
10 December 2021	22:00	Qatar	5–0	United Arab Emirates	Quarter-finals	63,439
18 December 2021	18:00	Tunisia	0–2 (a.e.t.)	Algeria	Final	60,456

=== 2022 FIFA World Cup ===
The Al Bayt Stadium hosted nine matches during the 2022 FIFA World Cup, including the opening match.

Date	Time	Team No. 1	Result	Team No. 2	Round	Attendance
20 November 2022	19:00	Qatar	0–2	Ecuador	Group A (opening match)	67,372
23 November 2022	13:00	Morocco	0–0	Croatia	Group F	59,407
25 November 2022	22:00	England	0–0	United States	Group B	68,463
27 November 2022	22:00	Spain	1–1	Germany	Group E	68,895
29 November 2022	18:00	Netherlands	2–0	Qatar	Group A	66,784
1 December 2022	22:00	Costa Rica	2–4	Germany	Group E	67,054
4 December 2022	22:00	England	3–0	Senegal	Round of 16	65,985
10 December 2022	22:00	England	1–2	France	Quarter-finals	68,895
14 December 2022	22:00	France	2–0	Morocco	Semi-finals	68,294

=== 2023 AFC Asian Cup ===
On 5 April 2023, the Al Bayt Stadium was chosen as one of eight (then nine) venues for the 2023 AFC Asian Cup. It hosted four matches during the tournament.

Date	Time	Team No. 1	Result	Team No. 2	Round	Attendance
17 January 2024	17:30	Tajikistan	0–1	Qatar	Group A	57,460
23 January 2024	14:30	Syria	1–0	India	Group B	42,787
29 January 2024	19:00	Qatar	2–1	Palestine	Round of 16	63,753
3 February 2024	18:30	Qatar	1–1 (a.e.t.) (3–2 p)	Uzbekistan	Quarter-finals	58,791

=== 2025 FIFA Arab Cup ===
The Al Bayt Stadium hosted seven matches during the 2025 FIFA Arab Cup.

Date	Time	Team No. 1	Result	Team No. 2	Round	Attendance
1 December 2025	19:30	Qatar	0–1	Palestine	Group A	61,475
3 December 2025	20:00	Jordan	2–1	United Arab Emirates	Group C	30,759
5 December 2025	21:30	Comoros	1–3	Saudi Arabia	Group B	32,219
7 December 2025	20:00	Qatar	0–3	Tunisia	Group A	48,151
9 December 2025	17:30	Egypt	0–3	Jordan	Group C	55,658
12 December 2025	20:30	Algeria	1–1 (a.e.t.) (6–7 p)	United Arab Emirates	Quarter-finals	50,424
15 December 2025	20:30	Saudi Arabia	0–1	Jordan	Semi-finals	62,825

== See also ==
- List of association football stadiums by capacity
- List of football stadiums in Qatar
- Lists of stadiums

Events and tenants
Preceded by Prince Abdullah al-Faisal Stadium; Jeddah	FIFA Arab Cup; Final venue 2021	Succeeded by TBD
Preceded by Luzhniki Stadium; Moscow	FIFA World Cup; Opening match venue 2022	Succeeded by Estadio Azteca; Mexico City
