= 2021 FIFA Arab Cup squads =

The 2021 FIFA Arab Cup was an international football tournament held in Qatar from 30 November to 18 December 2021. The 16 national teams involved in the tournament were required to register a squad of 23 players, including three goalkeepers, selected from an initial provisional list of 35 players. Only players in these squads were eligible to take part in the tournament.

The position listed for each player is per the official squad list published by FIFA. The age listed for each player is on 30 November 2021, the first day of the tournament. The numbers of caps and goals listed for each player do not include any matches played after the start of the tournament. The club listed is the club for which the player last played a competitive match prior to the tournament. (Note: This is the club a player was last able to play for during the previous season in the event a player did not play a competitive match.) The nationality for each club reflects the national association (not the league) to which the club is affiliated. A flag is included for coaches who are of a different nationality than their own national team.

== Group A ==
=== Bahrain ===
Bahrain's final squad was announced on 21 November 2021.

Coach: (Portugal) Hélio Sousa

No.	Pos.	Player	Date of birth (age)	Caps	Goals	Club
1	GK	Sayed Shubbar Alawi	11 August 1985 (aged 36)	25	0	(Bahrain Football Association) Al-Khaldiya
2	DF	Sayed Baqer	14 April 1994 (aged 27)	27	0	(Bahrain Football Association) Al-Riffa
3	DF	Waleed Al Hayam	3 February 1991 (aged 30)	79	2	(Bahrain Football Association) Al-Muharraq
4	MF	Sayed Dhiya Saeed	17 July 1992 (aged 29)	99	7	(Bahrain Football Association) Al-Khaldiya
5	DF	Ahmed Bughammar	30 December 1997 (aged 23)	20	1	(Bahrain Football Association) Al-Khaldiya
6	DF	Ahmed Merza	24 February 1991 (aged 30)	4	0	(Bahrain Football Association) Al-Hidd
7	MF	Ali Madan	30 November 1995 (aged 26)	53	11	(United Arab Emirates Football Association) Al-Urooba
8	FW	Mohamed Marhoon	12 February 1998 (aged 23)	28	12	(Bahrain Football Association) Al-Riffa
9	FW	Mahdi Abduljabbar	25 June 1991 (aged 30)	20	7	(Bahrain Football Association) Manama
10	MF	Abdulwahab Al-Malood	7 June 1990 (aged 31)	62	5	(Bahrain Football Association) Al-Muharraq
11	FW	Ismail Abdullatif	11 September 1990 (aged 31)	124	47	(Bahrain Football Association) Al-Khaldiya
12	MF	Jasim Khelaif	22 February 1998 (aged 23)	4	0	(Bahrain Football Association) East Riffa
13	FW	Mohamed Al-Romaihi	9 September 1990 (aged 31)	40	16	(Bahrain Football Association) East Riffa
14	MF	Mohammed Al-Hardan	6 October 1997 (aged 24)	17	1	(Bahrain Football Association) Al-Khaldiya
15	MF	Jasim Al-Shaikh	1 February 1996 (aged 25)	37	3	(Bahrain Football Association) Al-Riffa
16	DF	Sayed Redha Isa	7 August 1994 (aged 27)	46	3	(Bahrain Football Association) Al-Riffa
17	MF	Abbas Al-Asfoor	2 March 1999 (aged 22)	7	0	(Bahrain Football Association) Al-Riffa
18	DF	Ahmed Nabeel	25 August 1995 (aged 26)	9	0	(Bahrain Football Association) Manama
19	MF	Kamil Al Aswad	8 April 1994 (aged 27)	68	9	(Bahrain Football Association) Al-Riffa
20	FW	Mahdi Al-Humaidan	19 May 1995 (aged 26)	25	1	(Bahrain Football Association) Al-Khaldiya
21	GK	Sayed Mohammed Jaffer (captain)	25 August 1985 (aged 36)	133	0	(Bahrain Football Association) Al-Muharraq
22	GK	Ammar Mohamed	10 February 1999 (aged 22)	0	0	(Bahrain Football Association) Manama
23	DF	Rashed Al-Hooti	24 December 1989 (aged 31)	74	0	(Bahrain Football Association) Al-Muharraq

=== Iraq ===
Iraq's final squad was announced on 20 November 2021. Ibrahim Bayesh and Mohammed Ali Abbood withdrew injured and were replaced by Yaser Kasim and Hussein Ammar on 25 November.

Coach: (Montenegro) Željko Petrović

No.	Pos.	Player	Date of birth (age)	Caps	Goals	Club
1	GK	Fahad Talib	21 October 1994 (aged 27)	11	0	(Iraq Football Association) Al-Quwa Al-Jawiya
2	DF	Munaf Younis	16 November 1996 (aged 25)	0	0	(Iraq Football Association) Al-Karkh
3	DF	Frans Putros	14 March 1993 (aged 28)	7	0	(Danish Football Association) Viborg FF
4	DF	Mustafa Nadhim	23 September 1993 (aged 28)	31	3	(Iraq Football Association) Al-Diwaniya
5	DF	Hassan Raed	23 September 2000 (aged 21)	3	0	(Iraq Football Association) Al-Quwa Al-Jawiya
6	MF	Muntadher Mohammed	5 June 2001 (aged 20)	0	0	(Iraq Football Association) Al-Zawraa
7	DF	Sherko Karim	25 May 1996 (aged 25)	8	1	(Iraq Football Association) Erbil
8	MF	Yaser Kasim	10 May 1991 (aged 30)	19	3	(Iraq Football Association) Zakho
9	FW	Aymen Hussein	22 March 1996 (aged 25)	43	6	(Qatar Football Association) Umm Salal
10	FW	Alaa Abbas	27 July 1997 (aged 24)	18	3	(Iraq Football Association) Al-Quwa Al-Jawiya
11	FW	Hasan Abdulkareem	1 January 1999 (aged 22)	0	0	(Iraq Football Association) Al-Karkh
12	GK	Ali Yaseen	9 August 1993 (aged 28)	0	0	(Iraq Football Association) Al-Zawraa
13	MF	Bashar Resan	22 December 1996 (aged 24)	47	2	(Qatar Football Association) Qatar SC
14	MF	Amjad Attwan (captain)	12 March 1997 (aged 24)	58	1	(Qatar Football Association) Al-Shamal
15	DF	Hussein Ammar	18 August 1999 (aged 22)	0	0	(Iraq Football Association) Naft Al-Basra
16	FW	Ahmed Farhan	1 January 1999 (aged 22)	0	0	(Iraq Football Association) Naft Al-Basra
17	MF	Ahmad Fadhel	1 January 1992 (aged 29)	6	0	(Iraq Football Association) Al-Zawraa
18	MF	Sajjad Jassim	7 January 1996 (aged 25)	5	1	(Iraq Football Association) Naft Al-Wasat
19	MF	Mohammed Qasim	6 December 1996 (aged 24)	20	2	(Iraq Football Association) Al-Shorta
20	GK	Ahmed Basil	19 August 1996 (aged 25)	0	0	(Iraq Football Association) Al-Shorta
21	FW	Ali Yousif	19 January 1996 (aged 25)	0	0	(Iraq Football Association) Al-Shorta
22	DF	Rebin Sulaka	12 April 1992 (aged 29)	26	0	(Football Association of Thailand) Buriram United
23	DF	Maitham Jabbar	10 November 2000 (aged 21)	17	0	(Iraq Football Association) Al-Quwa Al-Jawiya

=== Oman ===
Oman's final squad was announced on 18 November 2021.

Coach: (Croatia) Branko Ivanković

No.	Pos.	Player	Date of birth (age)	Caps	Goals	Club
1	GK	Ibrahim Al-Mukhaini	20 June 1997 (aged 24)	0	0	(Oman Football Association) Al-Nasr
2	DF	Ahmed Al-Kaabi	15 September 1996 (aged 25)	4	0	(Oman Football Association) Al-Nahda
3	DF	Fahmi Durbin	10 October 1993 (aged 28)	18	0	(Oman Football Association) Al-Nasr
4	MF	Arshad Al-Alawi	12 April 2000 (aged 21)	12	1	(Oman Football Association) Al-Seeb
5	DF	Juma Al-Habsi	28 January 1996 (aged 25)	13	0	(Oman Football Association) Al-Seeb
6	DF	Ahmed Al Khamisi	26 November 1991 (aged 30)	8	0	(Oman Football Association) Al-Suwaiq
7	FW	Khalid Al-Hajri	10 March 1994 (aged 27)	36	15	(Oman Football Association) Dhofar
8	MF	Mataz Saleh	8 May 1996 (aged 25)	8	1	(Oman Football Association) Dhofar
9	FW	Issam Al Sabhi	1 May 1997 (aged 24)	10	2	(Oman Football Association) Al-Suwaiq
10	MF	Mohsin Jouhar Al-Khaldi (captain)	16 August 1988 (aged 33)	62	8	(Oman Football Association) Oman Club
11	FW	Muhsen Al-Ghassani	27 March 1997 (aged 24)	29	7	(Oman Football Association) Al-Seeb
12	MF	Abdullah Fawaz	3 October 1996 (aged 25)	15	2	(Oman Football Association) Dhofar
13	DF	Khalid Al-Braiki	3 July 1993 (aged 28)	15	0	(Oman Football Association) Al-Seeb
14	DF	Amjad Al-Harthi	1 January 1994 (aged 27)	11	1	(Oman Football Association) Al-Seeb
15	FW	Jameel Al-Yahmadi	4 January 1994 (aged 27)	36	2	(Qatar Football Association) Al-Markhiya
16	MF	Omar Al-Fazari	19 May 1993 (aged 28)	9	0	(Oman Football Association) Al-Rustaq
17	FW	Mohammed Al-Ghafri	17 May 1997 (aged 24)	14	1	(Oman Football Association) Al-Rustaq
18	GK	Ibrahim Al-Rajhi	5 October 2000 (aged 21)	0	0	(Oman Football Association) Al-Nasr
19	FW	Rabia Al-Alawi	31 March 1995 (aged 26)	18	6	(Oman Football Association) Al-Seeb
20	MF	Salaah Al-Yahyaei	4 January 1994 (aged 27)	28	4	(Oman Football Association) Al-Seeb
21	DF	Mahmood Al-Mushaifri	14 January 1993 (aged 28)	5	0	(Oman Football Association) Al-Suwaiq
22	GK	Ahmed Al-Rawahi	5 May 1994 (aged 27)	4	0	(Oman Football Association) Al-Seeb
23	MF	Harib Al-Saadi	1 February 1990 (aged 31)	54	0	(Oman Football Association) Dhofar

=== Qatar ===
Qatar's final squad was announced on 19 November 2021.

Coach: (Spain) Félix Sánchez

No.	Pos.	Player	Date of birth (age)	Caps	Goals	Club
1	GK	Saad Al-Sheeb	19 February 1990 (aged 31)	74	0	(Qatar Football Association) Al-Sadd
2	DF	Pedro Miguel	6 August 1990 (aged 31)	74	1	(Qatar Football Association) Al-Sadd
3	DF	Abdelkarim Hassan	28 August 1993 (aged 28)	115	15	(Qatar Football Association) Al-Sadd
4	MF	Mohammed Waad	18 September 1999 (aged 22)	11	0	(Qatar Football Association) Al-Sadd
5	DF	Tarek Salman	5 December 1997 (aged 23)	48	0	(Qatar Football Association) Al-Sadd
6	MF	Abdulaziz Hatem	28 October 1990 (aged 31)	90	9	(Qatar Football Association) Al-Rayyan
7	FW	Ahmed Alaaeldin	31 January 1993 (aged 28)	42	1	(Qatar Football Association) Al-Gharafa
8	MF	Ali Assadalla	19 January 1993 (aged 28)	53	12	(Qatar Football Association) Al-Sadd
9	FW	Mohammed Muntari	20 December 1993 (aged 27)	40	11	(Qatar Football Association) Al-Duhail
10	FW	Hassan Al-Haydos (captain)	11 December 1990 (aged 30)	152	33	(Qatar Football Association) Al-Sadd
11	FW	Akram Afif	18 November 1996 (aged 25)	75	21	(Qatar Football Association) Al-Sadd
12	MF	Karim Boudiaf	16 September 1990 (aged 31)	103	5	(Qatar Football Association) Al-Duhail
13	DF	Musab Kheder	26 September 1993 (aged 28)	24	0	(Qatar Football Association) Al-Sadd
14	DF	Homam Ahmed	25 August 1999 (aged 22)	18	2	(Qatar Football Association) Al-Gharafa
15	DF	Bassam Al-Rawi	16 December 1997 (aged 23)	44	2	(Qatar Football Association) Al-Duhail
16	DF	Boualem Khoukhi	7 September 1990 (aged 31)	91	19	(Qatar Football Association) Al-Sadd
17	DF	Ismaeel Mohammad	5 April 1990 (aged 31)	59	4	(Qatar Football Association) Al-Duhail
18	FW	Khalid Muneer	24 February 1998 (aged 23)	0	0	(Qatar Football Association) Al-Wakrah
19	FW	Almoez Ali	19 August 1996 (aged 25)	74	36	(Qatar Football Association) Al-Duhail
20	MF	Abdullah Al-Ahrak	10 May 1997 (aged 24)	24	1	(Qatar Football Association) Al-Duhail
21	GK	Yousef Hassan	24 May 1996 (aged 25)	8	0	(Qatar Football Association) Al-Gharafa
22	GK	Meshaal Barsham	14 February 1998 (aged 23)	12	0	(Qatar Football Association) Al-Sadd
23	MF	Assim Madibo	22 October 1996 (aged 25)	38	0	(Qatar Football Association) Al-Duhail

== Group B ==
=== Mauritania ===
Mauritania's final squad was announced on 19 November 2021.

Coach: (France) Didier Gomes Da Rosa

No.	Pos.	Player	Date of birth (age)	Caps	Goals	Club
1	GK	M'Backé N'Diaye	19 December 1994 (aged 26)	0	0	(Football Federation of the Islamic Republic of Mauritania) Nouakchott Kings
2	DF	Moustapha Diaw	31 December 1996 (aged 24)	48	1	(Bahrain Football Association) Manama
3	DF	Mohamedhen Beibou	5 December 1995 (aged 25)	1	0	(Football Federation of the Islamic Republic of Mauritania) FC Nouadhibou
4	DF	Harouna Abou Demba	31 December 1991 (aged 29)	14	0	Unattached
5	DF	Abdoul Ba (captain)	8 February 1994 (aged 27)	47	0	(Libyan Football Federation) Al-Ahli
6	MF	Guessouma Fofana	17 December 1992 (aged 28)	0	0	(Romanian Football Federation) Cluj
7	FW	Idrissa Thiam	2 September 2000 (aged 21)	3	0	(Football Federation of the Islamic Republic of Mauritania) ASAC Concorde
8	FW	Mamadou Niass	4 June 1994 (aged 27)	37	5	(Egyptian Football Association) Al-Mokawloon Al-Arab
9	FW	Hemeya Tanjy	1 May 1998 (aged 23)	22	2	(Football Federation of the Islamic Republic of Mauritania) FC Nouadhibou
10	MF	Adama Ba	27 August 1993 (aged 28)	41	6	Unattached
11	FW	Bessam	5 December 1987 (aged 33)	59	11	(Football Federation of the Islamic Republic of Mauritania) FC Nouadhibou
12	MF	Alassane Diop	22 September 1997 (aged 24)	15	0	(Oman Football Association) Al-Orouba
13	DF	Oumar Mangane	31 December 1992 (aged 28)	7	0	(Football Federation of the Islamic Republic of Mauritania) FC Nouadhibou
14	MF	Mohamed Dellahi Yali	1 November 1997 (aged 24)	50	2	(Libyan Football Federation) Al-Nasr
15	DF	Bakary N'Diaye	26 November 1998 (aged 23)	38	1	(Hellenic Football Federation) Rodos
16	GK	Namori Diaw	30 December 1994 (aged 26)	19	0	(Football Federation of the Islamic Republic of Mauritania) ASC Kédia
17	DF	Demba Traoré	30 September 1993 (aged 28)	0	0	(Football Federation of the Islamic Republic of Mauritania) Tevragh-Zeina
18	MF	Bodda Mouhsine	18 June 1994 (aged 27)	9	0	(Football Federation of the Islamic Republic of Mauritania) FC Nouadhibou
19	FW	Salem Dianos	23 May 1999 (aged 22)	0	0	(Saudi Arabian Football Federation) Al-Kholood
20	MF	Oumar M'Bareck	15 March 2002 (aged 19)	0	0	(Football Federation of the Islamic Republic of Mauritania) ASAC Concorde
21	DF	Ablaye Sy	14 August 1994 (aged 27)	0	0	(Saudi Arabian Football Federation) Al-Ansar
22	GK	Babacar Diop	17 September 1995 (aged 26)	6	0	(Football Federation of the Islamic Republic of Mauritania) ASC Police
23	FW	Mouhamed Soueid	31 December 1991 (aged 29)	3	0	(Football Federation of the Islamic Republic of Mauritania) Tevragh-Zeina

=== Syria ===
Syria's final squad was announced on 19 November 2021.

Coach: (Romania) Valeriu Tița

No.	Pos.	Player	Date of birth (age)	Caps	Goals	Club
1	GK	Ibrahim Alma (captain)	18 October 1991 (aged 30)	67	0	(Syrian Football Association) Jableh
2	DF	Ahmad Al-Khassi	27 April 1999 (aged 22)	0	0	(Syrian Football Association) Al-Jaish
3	DF	Diaa Al-Haq Mohammad	1 January 1999 (aged 22)	0	0	(Syrian Football Association) Al-Wahda
4	DF	Fares Arnaout	31 January 1997 (aged 24)	9	0	(Bahrain Football Association) Manama
5	DF	Yosief Mohammad	26 June 1999 (aged 22)	5	0	(Bahrain Football Association) Al-Ahli
6	DF	Amro Jenyat	15 January 1993 (aged 28)	29	1	(Syrian Football Association) Al-Karamah
7	FW	Mohammad Al Hallak	1 January 1999 (aged 22)	3	0	(Bahrain Football Association) Manama
8	FW	Ward Alslamh	15 July 1994 (aged 27)	15	0	(Bahrain Football Association) Manama
9	FW	Ali Bashmani	17 January 2000 (aged 21)	0	0	(Syrian Football Association) Tishreen
10	FW	Mahmoud Al-Mawas	1 January 1993 (aged 28)	72	14	(Iraq Football Association) Al-Shorta
11	FW	Mahmoud Al Baher	3 January 1994 (aged 27)	0	0	(Bahrain Football Association) Al-Riffa
12	MF	Mohammed Osman	1 January 1994 (aged 27)	7	0	(Royal Dutch Football Association) Sparta Rotterdam
13	DF	Thaer Krouma	2 February 1990 (aged 31)	8	0	(Bahrain Football Association) Al-Najma
14	MF	Mohamad Rihanieh	26 December 2001 (aged 19)	4	0	(Syrian Football Association) Al-Ittihad
15	DF	Mohammad Shehioni	2 August 1992 (aged 29)	0	0	(Syrian Football Association) Al-Karamah
16	MF	Kamel Hmeisheh	23 July 1998 (aged 23)	0	0	(Syrian Football Association) Tishreen
17	MF	Mustafa Jneid	20 January 2000 (aged 21)	0	0	(Syrian Football Association) Hutteen
18	MF	Mouhamad Anez	14 May 1995 (aged 26)	0	0	(Bahrain Football Association) Al-Riffa
19	DF	Muayad Al Khouli	16 October 1993 (aged 28)	0	0	(Oman Football Association) Al-Nasr
20	MF	Oliver Kass Kawo	3 December 2001 (aged 19)	0	0	(Swedish Football Association) Järfälla
21	MF	Mohammad Al Marmour	17 September 1995 (aged 26)	19	3	(Qatar Football Association) Al-Mesaimeer
22	GK	Taha Mosa	24 May 1987 (aged 34)	5	0	(Syrian Football Association) Al-Wahda
23	GK	Khaled Haj Othman	1 May 1987 (aged 34)	0	0	(Syrian Football Association) Al-Ittihad

=== Tunisia ===
Tunisia's final squad was announced on 19 November 2021. Aymen Abdennour withdrew injured and was replaced by Jasser Khmiri on 28 November. Anis Ben Slimane withdrew and was replaced by Mootez Zaddem on 29 November.

Coach: Mondher Kebaier

No.	Pos.	Player	Date of birth (age)	Caps	Goals	Club
1	GK	Farouk Ben Mustapha	1 July 1989 (aged 32)	41	0	(Tunisian Football Federation) Espérance de Tunis
2	DF	Bilel Ifa	9 March 1990 (aged 31)	20	0	(Tunisian Football Federation) Club Africain
3	DF	Montassar Talbi	26 May 1998 (aged 23)	8	0	(Russian Football Union) Rubin Kazan
4	DF	Yassine Meriah	2 July 1993 (aged 28)	55	3	(United Arab Emirates Football Association) Al-Ain
5	DF	Jasser Khmiri	27 July 1997 (aged 24)	1	0	(United States Soccer Federation) San Antonio
6	MF	Ghaylen Chaaleli	28 February 1994 (aged 27)	20	1	(Tunisian Football Federation) Espérance de Tunis
7	FW	Youssef Msakni	28 October 1990 (aged 31)	71	12	(Qatar Football Association) Al-Arabi
8	FW	Fakhreddine Ben Youssef	23 June 1991 (aged 30)	51	6	(Egyptian Football Association) Pyramids
9	MF	Firas Ben Larbi	2 May 1996 (aged 25)	2	0	(United Arab Emirates Football Association) Ajman
10	MF	Hannibal Mejbri	21 January 2003 (aged 18)	3	0	(The Football Association) Manchester United
11	FW	Seifeddine Jaziri	12 February 1993 (aged 28)	12	4	(Egyptian Football Association) Zamalek
12	DF	Ali Maâloul	1 January 1990 (aged 31)	72	2	(Egyptian Football Association) Al-Ahly
13	MF	Ferjani Sassi	18 March 1992 (aged 29)	66	5	(Qatar Football Association) Al-Duhail
14	DF	Amine Ben Hamida	25 December 1995 (aged 25)	0	0	(Tunisian Football Federation) Espérance de Tunis
15	MF	Ali Ben Romdhane	6 September 1999 (aged 22)	11	0	(Tunisian Football Federation) Espérance de Tunis
16	GK	Bechir Ben Saïd	29 November 1992 (aged 29)	0	0	(Tunisian Football Federation) US Monastir
17	MF	Yassine Chikhaoui (captain)	21 September 1986 (aged 35)	41	10	(Tunisian Football Federation) Étoile du Sahel
18	MF	Saad Bguir	22 March 1994 (aged 27)	16	5	(Saudi Arabian Football Federation) Abha
19	MF	Mootez Zaddem	5 January 2001 (aged 20)	4	0	(Tunisian Football Federation) Étoile du Sahel
20	DF	Mohamed Dräger	25 June 1996 (aged 25)	20	3	(The Football Association) Nottingham Forest
21	DF	Hamza Mathlouthi	25 July 1992 (aged 29)	33	0	(Egyptian Football Association) Zamalek
22	GK	Mouez Hassen	5 March 1995 (aged 26)	16	0	(Tunisian Football Federation) Club Africain
23	FW	Naïm Sliti	27 July 1992 (aged 29)	53	12	(Saudi Arabian Football Federation) Al-Ettifaq

=== United Arab Emirates ===
The United Arab Emirates' final squad was announced on 22 November 2021.

Coach: (Netherlands) Bert van Marwijk

No.	Pos.	Player	Date of birth (age)	Caps	Goals	Club
1	GK	Ali Khasif	9 June 1987 (aged 34)	39	0	(United Arab Emirates Football Association) Al-Jazira
2	DF	Mohammed Al-Menhali	27 October 1990 (aged 31)	14	0	(United Arab Emirates Football Association) Al-Wahda
3	DF	Walid Abbas (captain)	11 June 1985 (aged 36)	92	6	(United Arab Emirates Football Association) Shabab Al-Ahli
4	DF	Shahin Abdulrahman	16 November 1992 (aged 29)	11	0	(United Arab Emirates Football Association) Sharjah
5	MF	Ali Salmeen	2 April 1995 (aged 26)	32	2	(United Arab Emirates Football Association) Al-Wasl
6	DF	Mohanad Salem	1 March 1985 (aged 36)	59	2	(United Arab Emirates Football Association) Al-Ittihad Kalba
7	FW	Ali Mabkhout	5 October 1990 (aged 31)	96	79	(United Arab Emirates Football Association) Al-Jazira
8	MF	Majid Rashid	16 May 2000 (aged 21)	0	0	(United Arab Emirates Football Association) Sharjah
9	DF	Bandar Al-Ahbabi	9 July 1990 (aged 31)	26	1	(United Arab Emirates Football Association) Al-Ain
10	FW	Ismail Matar	7 April 1983 (aged 38)	122	34	(United Arab Emirates Football Association) Al-Wahda
11	FW	Caio Canedo	9 August 1990 (aged 31)	13	3	(United Arab Emirates Football Association) Al-Ain
12	MF	Abdulla Hamad	18 September 2001 (aged 20)	2	0	(United Arab Emirates Football Association) Al-Wahda
13	DF	Mohammed Al-Attas	5 August 1997 (aged 24)	13	1	(United Arab Emirates Football Association) Al-Jazira
14	FW	Khalil Ibrahim	4 May 1993 (aged 28)	6	0	(United Arab Emirates Football Association) Al-Wahda
15	FW	Mohammed Jumaa	28 January 1997 (aged 24)	6	1	(United Arab Emirates Football Association) Shabab Al-Ahli
16	FW	Ali Saleh	22 January 2000 (aged 21)	9	2	(United Arab Emirates Football Association) Al-Wasl
17	GK	Khalid Eisa	15 September 1989 (aged 32)	30	0	(United Arab Emirates Football Association) Al-Ain
18	MF	Abdullah Ramadan	7 March 1998 (aged 23)	17	0	(United Arab Emirates Football Association) Al-Jazira
19	FW	Tahnoon Al-Zaabi	10 April 1999 (aged 22)	7	0	(United Arab Emirates Football Association) Al-Wahda
20	FW	Sebastián Tagliabúe	22 February 1985 (aged 36)	8	3	(United Arab Emirates Football Association) Al-Nasr
21	DF	Mahmoud Khamees	28 October 1987 (aged 34)	38	1	(United Arab Emirates Football Association) Al-Wahda
22	GK	Mohamed Al-Shamsi	4 January 1997 (aged 24)	0	0	(United Arab Emirates Football Association) Al-Wahda
23	DF	Abdulaziz Haikal	10 September 1990 (aged 31)	12	0	(United Arab Emirates Football Association) Shabab Al-Ahli

== Group C ==
=== Jordan ===
Jordan's final squad was announced on 26 November 2021. On 30 November 2021, Mohammad Abu Zrayq replaced Anas Hammad, who tested positive for COVID-19 four days after being named in the squad.

Coach: (Iraq) Adnan Hamad

No.	Pos.	Player	Date of birth (age)	Caps	Goals	Club
1	GK	Yazid Abu Layla	8 January 1993 (aged 28)	6	0	(Jordan Football Association) Al-Faisaly
2	DF	Mohammad Abu Hasheesh	9 May 1995 (aged 26)	5	0	(Jordan Football Association) Al-Salt
3	DF	Mohannad Khairullah	25 July 1993 (aged 28)	13	2	(Jordan Football Association) Al-Ramtha
4	MF	Baha' Abdel-Rahman	5 January 1987 (aged 34)	118	6	(Jordan Football Association) Sahab
5	DF	Yazan Al-Arab	31 January 1996 (aged 25)	31	1	(Jordan Football Association) Al-Wehdat
6	DF	Hadi Al-Hourani	14 April 2000 (aged 21)	0	0	(Jordan Football Association) Al-Ramtha
7	FW	Mohammad Abu Zrayq	30 December 1997 (aged 23)	9	1	(Jordan Football Association) Al-Ramtha
8	MF	Noor Al-Rawabdeh	24 February 1997 (aged 24)	20	0	(Bahrain Football Association) Al-Muharraq
9	FW	Baha' Faisal	30 May 1995 (aged 26)	49	15	(Qatar Football Association) Al-Shamal
10	FW	Yazan Al-Naimat	4 June 1999 (aged 22)	12	1	(Jordan Football Association) Sahab
11	FW	Yaseen Al-Bakhit	24 March 1989 (aged 32)	61	6	(Qatar Football Association) Umm Salal
12	GK	Malek Shalabiya	20 February 1988 (aged 33)	0	0	(Jordan Football Association) Al-Ramtha
13	FW	Mahmoud Al-Mardi	6 October 1993 (aged 28)	24	1	(Bahrain Football Association) Al-Muharraq
14	MF	Ahmad Tha'er	2 April 1997 (aged 24)	2	0	(Jordan Football Association) Al-Wehdat
15	MF	Ibrahim Sadeh	27 April 2000 (aged 21)	10	0	(Jordan Football Association) Al-Jazeera
16	FW	Ali Olwan	26 March 2000 (aged 21)	10	1	(Jordan Football Association) Al-Jazeera
17	MF	Rajaei Ayed	25 July 1993 (aged 28)	31	0	(Jordan Football Association) Al-Wehdat
18	MF	Ahmad Sariweh	23 January 1994 (aged 27)	7	0	(Jordan Football Association) Al-Salt
19	DF	Abdallah Nasib	25 February 1994 (aged 27)	2	0	(Jordan Football Association) Al-Wehdat
20	FW	Hamza Al-Dardour	12 May 1991 (aged 30)	83	25	(Jordan Football Association) Al-Ramtha
21	DF	Mohammad Al-Dmeiri	30 August 1987 (aged 34)	84	2	(Jordan Football Association) Al-Wehdat
22	GK	Moataz Yaseen (captain)	3 November 1982 (aged 39)	25	0	(Jordan Football Association) Al-Salt
23	DF	Ihsan Haddad	5 February 1994 (aged 27)	43	1	(Iraq Football Association) Al-Quwa Al-Jawiya

=== Morocco ===
Morocco's squad was announced on 19 November 2021.

Coach: Hussein Ammouta (Note: The A' team coach took charge)

No.	Pos.	Player	Date of birth (age)	Caps	Goals	Club
1	GK	Anas Zniti	28 August 1988 (aged 33)	17	0	(Royal Moroccan Football Federation) Raja CA
2	DF	Ayoub El Amloud	8 April 1994 (aged 27)	1	0	(Royal Moroccan Football Federation) Wydad AC
3	DF	Achraf Dari	6 May 1999 (aged 22)	0	0	(Royal Moroccan Football Federation) Wydad AC
4	DF	Marwane Saâdane	17 January 1992 (aged 29)	7	1	(Saudi Arabian Football Federation) Al-Fateh
5	MF	Yahya Jabrane	18 June 1991 (aged 30)	12	1	(Royal Moroccan Football Federation) Wydad AC
6	MF	Mohammed Ali Bemammer	19 November 1989 (aged 32)	0	0	(Royal Moroccan Football Federation) IR Tanger
7	DF	Hamza El Moussaoui	7 April 1993 (aged 28)	6	1	(Royal Moroccan Football Federation) Moghreb Tétouan
8	MF	Walid El Karti	23 July 1994 (aged 27)	18	3	(Egyptian Football Association) Pyramids
9	FW	Walid Azaro	11 June 1995 (aged 26)	9	0	(Saudi Arabian Football Federation) Al-Ettifaq
10	MF	Ayman El Hassouni	22 February 1995 (aged 26)	0	0	(Royal Moroccan Football Federation) Wydad AC
11	FW	Ismail El Haddad	3 August 1990 (aged 31)	12	2	(Qatar Football Association) Al-Khor
12	GK	Abdelali Mhamdi	29 November 1991 (aged 30)	3	0	(Saudi Arabian Football Federation) Abha
13	DF	Badr Benoun (captain)	30 September 1993 (aged 28)	7	1	(Egyptian Football Association) Al-Ahly
14	FW	Karim El Berkaoui	13 November 1995 (aged 26)	2	0	(Saudi Arabian Football Federation) Al-Raed
15	DF	Soufiane Bouftini	3 August 1994 (aged 27)	8	2	(Qatar Football Association) Al-Ahli
16	DF	Mohamed Nahiri	22 October 1991 (aged 30)	13	1	(Royal Moroccan Football Federation) Raja CA
17	FW	Achraf Bencharki	24 September 1994 (aged 27)	17	1	(Egyptian Football Association) Zamalek
18	MF	Abdelilah Hafidi	30 January 1992 (aged 29)	22	3	(Royal Moroccan Football Federation) Raja CA
19	DF	Mohamed Chibi	21 January 1993 (aged 28)	1	0	(Royal Moroccan Football Federation) AS FAR
20	MF	Mohamed Fouzair	24 December 1991 (aged 29)	0	0	(Saudi Arabian Football Federation) Al-Raed
21	FW	Soufiane Rahimi	2 June 1996 (aged 25)	8	5	(United Arab Emirates Football Association) Al-Ain
22	GK	Mohamed Amsif	7 February 1989 (aged 32)	8	0	(Royal Moroccan Football Federation) FUS Rabat
23	MF	Driss Fettouhi	30 September 1989 (aged 32)	0	0	(Qatar Football Association) Al-Sailiya

=== Palestine ===
Palestine's final squad was announced on 18 November 2021.

Coach: (Tunisia) Makram Daboub

No.	Pos.	Player	Date of birth (age)	Caps	Goals	Club
1	GK	Abdallah Shaqfa	17 March 1991 (aged 30)	0	0	(Palestinian Football Association) Shabab Rafah
2	DF	Mohammed Khalil	5 April 1998 (aged 23)	6	0	(Palestinian Football Association) Hilal Al-Quds
3	MF	Mohammed Rashid	3 July 1995 (aged 26)	24	0	(Football Association of Indonesia) Persib Bandung
4	DF	Yaser Hamed	9 December 1997 (aged 23)	15	5	Unattached
5	DF	Mohammed Saleh	18 July 1993 (aged 28)	13	0	(Egyptian Football Association) El-Qanah
6	MF	Oday Kharoub	5 February 1993 (aged 28)	13	0	(Palestinian Football Association) Shabab Al-Khalil
7	DF	Khaled Salem	12 November 1993 (aged 28)	49	1	(Bahrain Football Association) Hidd
8	MF	Mohammed Yameen	19 September 1994 (aged 27)	27	1	(Palestinian Football Association) Hilal Al-Quds
9	FW	Tamer Seyam	25 December 1992 (aged 28)	46	10	(Palestinian Football Association) Shabab Al-Khalil
10	MF	Abdelhamid Abuhabib	6 August 1989 (aged 32)	34	7	(Palestinian Football Association) Shabab Al-Khalil
11	FW	Layth Kharoub	11 July 1991 (aged 30)	9	5	(Palestinian Football Association) Markaz Balata
12	FW	Mahmoud Eid	26 June 1993 (aged 28)	20	1	(Bahrain Football Association) Al-Muharraq
13	FW	Mahmoud Abu Warda	31 May 1995 (aged 26)	17	1	(Palestinian Football Association) Markaz Balata
14	MF	Yazan Iwaiwi	6 June 1994 (aged 27)	5	0	(Palestinian Football Association) Shabab Al-Khalil
15	DF	Abdelatif Bahdari (captain)	20 February 1984 (aged 37)	76	9	(Palestinian Football Association) Markaz Balata
16	GK	Amr Kaddoura	1 July 1994 (aged 27)	0	0	(Swedish Football Association) Landskrona BoIS
17	MF	Rashid Adawi	23 January 1992 (aged 29)	0	0	(Palestinian Football Association) Shabab Al-Dhahiriya
18	DF	Musa Saleem	18 October 1996 (aged 25)	7	0	(Palestinian Football Association) Shabab Al-Khalil
19	FW	Reebal Dahamshi	8 June 2002 (aged 19)	3	0	(Palestinian Football Association) Hilal Al-Quds
20	DF	Abd Al-Salam Salama	4 June 1998 (aged 23)	0	0	(Palestinian Football Association) Hilal Al-Quds
21	DF	Ahmed Qatmish	10 March 1998 (aged 23)	7	0	(Palestinian Football Association) Markaz Balata
22	GK	Rami Hamadeh	24 March 1994 (aged 27)	32	0	(Palestinian Football Association) Shabab Al-Khalil
23	MF	Mohammed Darweesh	2 June 1991 (aged 30)	44	0	(Palestinian Football Association) Hilal Al-Quds

=== Saudi Arabia ===
Saudi Arabia's final squad was announced on 18 November 2021. Ziyad Al-Johani withdrew injured and was replaced by Abdullah Radif on 27 November.

Coach: (France) Laurent Bonadéi (Note: The assistant coach took charge)

No.	Pos.	Player	Date of birth (age)	Caps	Goals	Club
1	GK	Mohammed Al-Rubaie	14 August 1997 (aged 24)	4	0	(Saudi Arabian Football Federation) Al-Ahli
2	DF	Muhannad Al-Shanqeeti	12 March 1999 (aged 22)	0	0	(Saudi Arabian Football Federation) Al-Ittihad
3	DF	Khalifah Al-Dawsari	2 January 1999 (aged 22)	0	0	(Saudi Arabian Football Federation) Al-Hilal
4	DF	Waleed Al-Ahmed	3 May 1999 (aged 22)	0	0	(Saudi Arabian Football Federation) Al-Faisaly
5	DF	Naif Almas	18 January 2000 (aged 21)	0	0	(Saudi Arabian Football Federation) Al-Nassr
6	DF	Nawaf Boushal	16 September 1999 (aged 22)	0	0	(Saudi Arabian Football Federation) Al-Fateh
7	MF	Turki Al-Ammar	23 September 1999 (aged 22)	4	0	(Saudi Arabian Football Federation) Al-Shabab
8	FW	Ayman Yahya	14 May 2001 (aged 20)	3	0	(Saudi Arabian Football Federation) Al-Nassr
9	FW	Firas Al-Buraikan	14 May 2000 (aged 21)	15	5	(Saudi Arabian Football Federation) Al-Fateh
10	FW	Abdullah Al-Hamdan	12 September 1999 (aged 22)	14	4	(Saudi Arabian Football Federation) Al-Hilal
11	MF	Bader Munshi	20 June 1999 (aged 22)	0	0	(Saudi Arabian Football Federation) Damac
12	DF	Saud Abdulhamid (captain)	18 July 1999 (aged 22)	9	0	(Saudi Arabian Football Federation) Al-Ittihad
13	DF	Moteb Al-Harbi	19 February 2000 (aged 21)	0	0	(Saudi Arabian Football Federation) Al-Shabab
14	DF	Ali Majrashi	1 October 1999 (aged 22)	0	0	(Saudi Arabian Football Federation) Al-Shabab
15	FW	Abdullah Radif	20 January 2003 (aged 18)	0	0	(Saudi Arabian Football Federation) Al-Hilal
16	DF	Sulaiman Hazazi	1 February 2003 (aged 18)	0	0	(Saudi Arabian Football Federation) Al-Taawoun
17	DF	Meshal Al-Sebyani	11 April 2001 (aged 20)	0	0	(Saudi Arabian Football Federation) Al-Faisaly
18	FW	Haitham Asiri	23 January 2000 (aged 21)	0	0	(Saudi Arabian Football Federation) Al-Ahli
19	MF	Hamed Al-Ghamdi	2 April 1999 (aged 22)	0	0	(Saudi Arabian Football Federation) Al-Ettifaq
20	MF	Ibrahim Mahnashi	18 November 1999 (aged 22)	0	0	(Saudi Arabian Football Federation) Al-Ettifaq
21	GK	Nawaf Al-Aqidi	10 May 2000 (aged 21)	0	0	(Saudi Arabian Football Federation) Al-Nassr
22	GK	Zaid Al-Bawardi	26 January 1997 (aged 24)	0	0	(Saudi Arabian Football Federation) Al-Shabab
23	FW	Mohammed Al-Qahtani	23 July 2002 (aged 19)	0	0	(Saudi Arabian Football Federation) Al-Hilal

== Group D ==
=== Algeria ===
Algeria's final squad was announced on 19 November 2021. Mehdi Abeid withdrew injured and was replaced by Yacine Titraoui on 27 November.

Coach: Madjid Bougherra (Note: The A' team coach took charge)

No.	Pos.	Player	Date of birth (age)	Caps	Goals	Club
1	GK	Moustapha Zeghba	21 November 1990 (aged 31)	1	0	(Saudi Arabian Football Federation) Damac
2	DF	Aimen Bouguerra	10 January 1997 (aged 24)	0	0	(Algerian Football Federation) Paradou AC
3	DF	Houcine Benayada	8 August 1992 (aged 29)	6	0	(Tunisian Football Federation) Étoile du Sahel
4	DF	Djamel Benlamri	25 December 1989 (aged 31)	25	0	(Qatar Football Association) Qatar SC
5	DF	Mehdi Tahrat	24 January 1990 (aged 31)	13	0	(Qatar Football Association) Al-Gharafa
6	MF	Yacine Titraoui	6 July 2003 (aged 18)	0	0	(Algerian Football Federation) Paradou AC
7	FW	Tayeb Meziani	27 February 1996 (aged 25)	2	0	(Tunisian Football Federation) Étoile du Sahel
8	MF	Amir Sayoud	30 September 1990 (aged 31)	2	0	(Saudi Arabian Football Federation) Al-Tai
9	FW	Baghdad Bounedjah	30 November 1991 (aged 30)	49	22	(Qatar Football Association) Al-Sadd
10	FW	Youcef Belaïli	14 March 1992 (aged 29)	29	6	(Qatar Football Association) Qatar SC
11	MF	Yacine Brahimi	8 February 1990 (aged 31)	56	11	(Qatar Football Association) Al-Rayyan
12	DF	Mohamed Amine Tougai	22 January 2000 (aged 21)	0	0	(Tunisian Football Federation) Espérance de Tunis
13	FW	Merouane Zerrouki	25 January 2001 (aged 20)	0	0	(Algerian Football Federation) Paradou AC
14	MF	Sofiane Bendebka	9 August 1992 (aged 29)	4	1	(Saudi Arabian Football Federation) Al-Fateh
15	FW	Hillal Soudani	25 November 1987 (aged 34)	53	23	(Saudi Arabian Football Federation) Damac
16	GK	Abderrahmane Medjadel	1 July 1998 (aged 23)	0	0	(Algerian Football Federation) Paradou AC
17	MF	Zakaria Draoui	20 February 1994 (aged 27)	0	0	(Algerian Football Federation) CR Belouizdad
18	MF	Houssem Eddine Mrezigue	23 March 2000 (aged 21)	0	0	(Algerian Football Federation) CR Belouizdad
19	DF	Abdelkader Bedrane	2 April 1992 (aged 29)	9	0	(Tunisian Football Federation) Espérance de Tunis
20	DF	Ilyes Chetti	22 January 1995 (aged 26)	2	0	(Tunisian Football Federation) Espérance de Tunis
21	DF	Ayoub Abdellaoui	16 February 1993 (aged 28)	9	0	(Saudi Arabian Football Federation) Al-Ettifaq
22	FW	Zineddine Boutmène	21 October 2000 (aged 21)	0	0	(Tunisian Football Federation) Étoile du Sahel
23	GK	Raïs M'Bolhi (captain)	25 April 1986 (aged 35)	83	0	(Saudi Arabian Football Federation) Al-Ettifaq

=== Egypt ===
Egypt's final squad was announced on 20 November 2021. On 27 November 2021, Ahmed Hegazi replaced Emam Ashour, who tested positive for COVID-19 three days after being named in the squad.

Coach: (Portugal) Carlos Queiroz

No.	Pos.	Player	Date of birth (age)	Caps	Goals	Club
1	GK	Mohamed El Shenawy	18 December 1988 (aged 32)	29	0	(Egyptian Football Association) Al-Ahly
2	DF	Ahmed Yassin	7 August 1997 (aged 24)	1	0	(Egyptian Football Association) National Bank of Egypt
3	DF	Omar Kamal	29 September 1993 (aged 28)	0	0	(Egyptian Football Association) Future
4	MF	Amr El Solia (captain)	2 April 1990 (aged 31)	33	0	(Egyptian Football Association) Al-Ahly
5	MF	Hamdy Fathy	29 September 1994 (aged 27)	11	2	(Egyptian Football Association) Al-Ahly
6	DF	Marwan Dawoud	27 August 1997 (aged 24)	0	0	(Egyptian Football Association) ENPPI
7	FW	Ahmed Refaat	20 June 1993 (aged 28)	1	0	(Egyptian Football Association) Future
8	MF	Mostafa Fathi	12 May 1994 (aged 27)	9	0	(Egyptian Football Association) Zamalek
9	FW	Mohamed Sherif	4 February 1996 (aged 25)	8	4	(Egyptian Football Association) Al-Ahly
10	FW	Marwan Hamdy	15 November 1996 (aged 25)	4	0	(Egyptian Football Association) Smouha
11	DF	Ahmed Hegazi	25 January 1991 (aged 30)	68	2	(Saudi Arabian Football Federation) Al-Ittihad
12	DF	Ayman Ashraf	9 April 1991 (aged 30)	22	2	(Egyptian Football Association) Al-Ahly
13	DF	Ahmed Fatouh	22 March 1998 (aged 23)	7	1	(Egyptian Football Association) Zamalek
14	DF	Akram Tawfik	8 November 1997 (aged 24)	4	1	(Egyptian Football Association) Al-Ahly
15	DF	Mahmoud "El Wensh" Hamdy	1 June 1995 (aged 26)	12	1	(Egyptian Football Association) Zamalek
16	GK	Mohamed Sobhy	15 July 1999 (aged 22)	0	0	(Egyptian Football Association) Pharco
17	MF	Mohanad Lasheen	29 May 1996 (aged 25)	1	0	(Egyptian Football Association) Tala'ea El-Gaish
18	DF	Mohamed Abdelmonem	1 February 1999 (aged 22)	0	0	(Egyptian Football Association) Future
19	FW	Osama Faisal	1 January 2001 (aged 20)	0	0	(Egyptian Football Association) National Bank of Egypt
20	MF	Hussein Faisal	4 March 1999 (aged 22)	0	0	(Egyptian Football Association) Smouha
21	MF	Ahmed "Zizo" Sayed	10 January 1996 (aged 25)	7	0	(Egyptian Football Association) Zamalek
22	MF	Mohamed "Afsha" Magdy	6 March 1996 (aged 25)	13	4	(Egyptian Football Association) Al-Ahly
23	GK	Mahmoud Gad	1 October 1998 (aged 23)	0	0	(Egyptian Football Association) ENPPI

=== Lebanon ===
Lebanon's final squad was announced on 23 November 2021. Ali Daher and Mohamad Kdouh withdrew injured and were replaced by Antoine Al Douaihy and Hussein Awada on 28 November.

Coach: (Czech Republic) Ivan Hašek

No.	Pos.	Player	Date of birth (age)	Caps	Goals	Club
1	GK	Antoine Al Douaihy	18 March 1999 (aged 22)	0	0	(Lebanese Football Association) Salam Zgharta
2	DF	Hussein El Dor	18 January 1994 (aged 27)	2	0	(Lebanese Football Association) Shabab Al-Sahel
3	DF	Maher Sabra	14 January 1992 (aged 29)	9	0	(Lebanese Football Association) Nejmeh
4	DF	Nour Mansour (captain)	22 October 1989 (aged 32)	59	2	(Lebanese Football Association) Al-Ahed
5	MF	Jihad Ayoub	30 March 1995 (aged 26)	0	0	(Lebanese Football Association) Al-Ansar
6	MF	Mouhammed-Ali Dhaini	1 March 1994 (aged 27)	9	0	(Swedish Football Association) Trelleborg
7	FW	Fadel Antar	13 November 1995 (aged 26)	0	0	(Lebanese Football Association) Shabab Al-Sahel
8	MF	Mahdi Zein	23 May 2000 (aged 21)	0	0	(Lebanese Football Association) Nejmeh
9	FW	Hilal El-Helwe	24 November 1994 (aged 27)	37	9	(Lebanese Football Association) Al-Ahed
10	MF	Mohamad Haidar	8 November 1989 (aged 32)	76	4	(Lebanese Football Association) Al-Ahed
11	MF	Hussein Awada	1 January 2000 (aged 21)	0	0	(Lebanese Football Association) Shabab Bourj
12	DF	Robert Alexander Melki	14 November 1992 (aged 29)	19	0	(Qatar Football Association) Al-Shahania
13	MF	George Felix Melki	23 July 1994 (aged 27)	21	1	(Swedish Football Association) AFC Eskilstuna
14	MF	Nader Matar	12 May 1992 (aged 29)	48	2	(Qatar Football Association) Muaither
15	MF	Walid Shour	10 June 1996 (aged 25)	4	0	(Lebanese Football Association) Shabab Al-Sahel
16	DF	Hassan Chaitou	16 June 1991 (aged 30)	13	0	(Lebanese Football Association) Al-Ansar
17	DF	Mohamad Zein Tahan	20 April 1988 (aged 33)	36	1	(Lebanese Football Association) Safa
18	DF	Kassem El Zein	2 December 1990 (aged 30)	27	0	(Lebanese Football Association) Nejmeh
19	MF	Zein Farran	21 July 1999 (aged 22)	0	0	(Lebanese Football Association) Al-Ahed
20	MF	Rabih Ataya	16 July 1989 (aged 32)	45	5	(Football Association of Malaysia) Kedah
21	GK	Mostafa Matar	10 September 1995 (aged 26)	10	0	(Lebanese Football Association) Al-Ahed
22	DF	Abbas Assi	9 July 1995 (aged 26)	8	0	(Lebanese Football Association) Shabab Al-Sahel
23	GK	Ali Sabeh	24 June 1994 (aged 27)	1	0	(Lebanese Football Association) Nejmeh

=== Sudan ===
Sudan's final squad was announced on 19 November 2021.

Coach: (France) Hubert Velud

No.	Pos.	Player	Date of birth (age)	Caps	Goals	Club
1	GK	Ali Abu Eshrein	6 December 1989 (aged 31)	23	0	(Sudan Football Association) Al-Hilal Omdurman
2	MF	Abuaagla Abdalla	11 March 1993 (aged 28)	49	2	(Sudan Football Association) Al-Hilal Omdurman
3	DF	Faris Abdalla	19 February 1994 (aged 27)	50	1	(Sudan Football Association) Al-Hilal Omdurman
4	DF	Amir Kamal	24 July 1992 (aged 29)	69	2	(Sudan Football Association) Al-Merrikh
5	DF	Ahmed Wadah	12 February 2000 (aged 21)	13	0	(Sudan Football Association) Al-Hilal Omdurman
6	DF	Mohamed Ering	20 October 1997 (aged 24)	9	0	(Sudan Football Association) Al-Hilal Omdurman
7	FW	Ramadan Agab	19 September 1989 (aged 32)	57	7	(Sudan Football Association) Al-Merrikh
8	MF	Mohamed Al Rashed	1 January 1994 (aged 27)	15	1	(Sudan Football Association) Al-Merrikh
9	FW	Yaser Muzmel	1 January 1992 (aged 29)	21	4	(Sudan Football Association) Al-Hilal Omdurman
10	FW	Mohamed Abdel Rahman	10 July 1993 (aged 28)	20	13	(Sudan Football Association) Al-Hilal Omdurman
11	FW	Muaaz Al-Quoz	25 April 1989 (aged 32)	35	3	(Sudan Football Association) Khartoum NC
12	DF	Ahmed Bibo	1 September 1994 (aged 27)	11	0	(Sudan Football Association) Al-Merrikh
13	DF	Walid Hassan	19 November 1991 (aged 30)	6	0	(Libyan Football Federation) Al-Ta'awon
14	MF	Salah Adel	3 April 1995 (aged 26)	9	0	(Sudan Football Association) Al-Hilal Omdurman
15	DF	Ather El Tahir	24 October 1996 (aged 25)	43	8	(Egyptian Football Association) Smouha
16	GK	Ishag Adam	1 January 1999 (aged 22)	2	0	(Sudan Football Association) Al-Hilal Omdurman
17	FW	Ahmed Saeed	1 January 1989 (aged 32)	2	0	(Sudan Football Association) Al-Ahly Merowe
18	DF	Samawal Merghani	22 October 1991 (aged 30)	24	1	(Sudan Football Association) Al-Hilal Omdurman
19	DF	Dhiya Mahjoub	30 May 1995 (aged 26)	17	1	(Sudan Football Association) Al-Merrikh
20	GK	Mohamed Mustafa	19 February 1996 (aged 25)	2	0	(Sudan Football Association) Al-Merrikh
21	MF	Walieldin Khedr	15 September 1995 (aged 26)	16	0	(Sudan Football Association) Al-Hilal Omdurman
22	FW	Al-Jezoli Nouh	24 October 2002 (aged 19)	7	0	(Sudan Football Association) Al-Merrikh
23	MF	Nasr Eldin El Shigail (captain)	7 April 1985 (aged 36)	71	0	(Sudan Football Association) Al-Hilal Omdurman

== Statistics ==
=== Age ===
==== Players ====
- Oldest: (Jordan) Moataz Yaseen (39 years, 27 days)
- Youngest: (Algeria) Yacine Titraoui (18 years, 127 days)

==== Goalkeepers ====
- Oldest: (Jordan) Moataz Yaseen (39 years, 27 days)
- Youngest: (Oman) Ibrahim Al-Rajhi (21 years, 56 days)

==== Captains ====
- Oldest: (Jordan) Moataz Yaseen (39 years, 27 days)
- Youngest: (Saudi Arabia) Saud Abdulhamid (22 years, 135 days)

=== Player representation by league system ===
League systems with 20 or more players represented are listed. In all, FIFA Arab Cup squad members played for clubs in 29 countries from 4 confederations.

Country	Players	Percentage	Outside national squad	Lower tier players
Qatar	42	11.41%	19	4
Saudi Arabia	39	10.59%	16	2
Bahrain	33	8.98%	11	1
Egypt	33	8.98%	11	1
United Arab Emirates	26	7.06%	3	0
Oman	24	6.52%	2	1
Sudan	21	5.7%	0	0
Iraq	20	5.43%	2	0
Others	130	35.33%	22	8
**Total**	368	100%	86	17

- The Qatar, United Arab Emirates and Saudi Arabia squads were made up entirely of players from the countries' respective domestic leagues.
- The Syria squad had the most players from a single foreign federation, with seven players employed in Bahrain.
- Of the Arab countries not represented by a national team at the FIFA Arab Cup, Libya's leagues provided the most squad members, with just three, while the top non-Arab country to provide players was Sweden with four.
- The Algeria squad had the least players playing in domestic leagues, with eight players only playing in Algeria.
- Three players were not attached to a club prior to the start of the tournament (Mauritania's Harouna Abou Demba and Adama Ba, and Palestine's Yaser Hamed).

=== Coaches representation by country ===
Coaches in bold represented their own country.

Number	Country	Coaches
3	France	Laurent Bonadéi (Saudi Arabia), Didier Gomes (Mauritania), Hubert Velud (Sudan)
2	Portugal	Carlos Queiroz (Egypt), Hélio Sousa (Bahrain)
2	Tunisia	Makram Daboub (Palestine), **Mondher Kebaier**
1	Algeria	**Madjid Bougherra**
1	Croatia	Branko Ivanković (Oman)
1	Czech Republic	Ivan Hašek (Lebanon)
1	Iraq	Adnan Hamad (Jordan)
1	Montenegro	Željko Petrović (Iraq)
1	Morocco	**Hussein Ammouta**
1	Netherlands	Bert van Marwijk (United Arab Emirates)
1	Romania	Valeriu Tița (Syria)
1	Spain	Félix Sánchez (Qatar)
