= 2021 FIFA Arab Cup Group D =

Second group (group stage) of the 2021 FIFA Arab Cup

Group D of the 2021 FIFA Arab Cup took place from 1 to 7 December 2021. The group consisted of Algeria, Egypt, Lebanon and Sudan.

The top two teams, Egypt and Algeria, advanced to the quarter-finals.

== Teams ==
Draw position	Team	Finals appearance	Last appearance	Previous best performance	FIFA Rankings	
Draw position	Team	Finals appearance	Last appearance	Previous best performance	April 2021 (Note: The rankings of April 2021 were used for seeding for the final draw.)	November 2021
D1	Algeria	3rd (Note: This is the first appearance for the Algeria first team at the tournament. The U23 team participated in the 1988 and 1998 editions.)	1998 (group stage)	Group stage (1988, 1998)	33	32
D2	Egypt	5th (Note: This is the third appearance for the Egypt first team at the tournament. The U23 team participated in the 2012 edition, while the U20 team participated in 1998.)	2012 (group stage)	Winners (1992)	46	45
D3	Lebanon	8th	2012 (group stage)	Third place (1963)	93	94
D4	Sudan	4th	2012 (group stage)	Group stage (1998, 2002, 2012)	123	124

== Standings ==
Pos	Team	Pld	W	D	L	GF	GA	GD	Pts	Qualification
1	Egypt	3	2	1	0	7	1	+6	7 (Note: Fair-play points: Egypt –6, Algeria –11.)	Advance to knockout stage
2	Algeria	3	2	1	0	7	1	+6	7	Advance to knockout stage
3	Lebanon	3	1	0	2	1	3	−2	3	
4	Sudan	3	0	0	3	0	10	−10	0	

Source: FIFA
Notes:

In the quarter-finals:

- Egypt advanced to play against Jordan (runners-up of Group C).
- Algeria advanced to play against Morocco (winners of Group C).

== Matches ==
All times listed are local time.

=== Algeria vs Sudan ===
1 December 2021
13:00

Algeria	4–0	Sudan
Bounedjah 11', 37'; Benlamri 43'; Soudani 46'	Report

Ahmad bin Ali Stadium, Al Rayyan
Attendance: 2,203
Referee: Ryuji Sato (Japan)

Algeria	Sudan

GK	23	Raïs M'Bolhi (c)
RB	3	Houcine Benayada
CB	4	Djamel Benlamri
CB	19	Abdelkader Bedrane
LB	20	Ilyes Chetti
CM	18	Houssem Eddine Mrezigue
CM	14	Sofiane Bendebka	(substituted off) 64'
RW	11	Yacine Brahimi	(substituted off) 87'
AM	15	Hillal Soudani	(substituted off) 87'
LW	8	Amir Sayoud
CF	9	Baghdad Bounedjah	(substituted off) 79'
Substitutions:
MF	17	Zakaria Draoui	(substituted on) 64'
FW	22	Zineddine Boutmène	(substituted on) 79'
MF	6	Yacine Titraoui	(substituted on) 87'
FW	13	Merouane Zerrouki	(substituted on) 87'
Manager:
Madjid Bougherra

GK	1	Ali Abu Eshrein
RB	13	Walid Hassan
CB	4	Amir Kamal
CB	6	Mohamed Ering
LB	3	Faris Abdalla
DM	23	Nasr Eldin El Shigail (c)
RM	9	Yaser Muzmel	(substituted off) 63'
LM	21	Walieldin Khedr	(substituted off) 63'
AM	19	Dhiya Mahjoub	(substituted off) 46'
CF	7	Ramadan Agab	(substituted off) 46'
CF	10	Mohamed Abdelrahman	(substituted off) 75'
Substitutions:
DF	12	Ahmed Bibo	(substituted on) 46'
MF	14	Salah Adel	(substituted on) 46'
MF	2	Abuaagla Abdalla	(substituted on) 63'
FW	22	Al-Jezoli Nouh	(substituted on) 63'
FW	11	Muaaz Al-Quoz	(substituted on) 75'
Manager:
(France) Hubert Velud

Man of the Match:
Baghdad Bounedjah (Algeria)

Assistant referees:
Jun Mihara (Japan)
Hiroshi Yamauchi (Japan)
Fourth official:
Fernando Hernández Gómez (Mexico)
Video assistant referee:
Hiroyuki Kimura (Japan)
Assistant video assistant referees:
Abdulla Al Marri (Qatar)

=== Egypt vs Lebanon ===
Right from the start, Egypt dominated possession, holding 76% of the ball in the first 15 minutes. Despite their dominance on the ball, they could not break through Lebanon's defence, having to resort to harmless crosses and long-distance shots. The first dangerous chance of the game came in the 33rd minute, when Egypt's Ahmed Hegazi headed from Mostafa Fathi's free kick, with Lebanon's Mostafa Matar saving the shot; El Wensh's rebound was cleared off the line by Felix Michel Melki. At half time, the result was 0–0, with Egypt incapable of capitalising from a couple of attacking opportunities. Matar proved decisive once again in the second half, saving a one-on-one attack from Afsha. It was Afsha who broke the deadlock in the 71st minute through a penalty, after Ahmed Fatouh was brought down inside the penalty area by Alexander Michel Melki. In the final 20 minutes, Lebanon modestly attempted to equalise in vain.

1 December 2021
16:00

Egypt	1–0	Lebanon
Afsha 71' (pen.)	Report

Al Thumama Stadium, Doha
Attendance: 11,757
Referee: Daniel Siebert (Germany)

Egypt	Lebanon

GK	1	Mohamed El Shenawy
RB	14	Akram Tawfik	(yellow card) 45+3'	(substituted off) 84'
CB	11	Ahmed Hegazi
CB	15	Mahmoud Hamdy
LB	13	Ahmed Fatouh
CM	5	Hamdy Fathy		(substituted off) 38'
CM	4	Amr El Solia (c)
RW	8	Mostafa Fathi		(substituted off) 46'
AM	22	Mohamed Magdy		(substituted off) 90+5'
LW	9	Mohamed Sherif	(yellow card) 73'	(substituted off) 84'
CF	10	Marwan Hamdy		(substituted off) 66'
Substitutions:
MF	17	Mohanad Lasheen		(substituted on) 38'
FW	7	Ahmed Refaat		(substituted on) 46'
MF	21	Ahmed Sayed		(substituted on) 66'
DF	3	Omar Kamal		(substituted on) 84'
FW	19	Osama Faisal		(substituted on) 84'
DF	12	Ayman Ashraf		(substituted on) 90+5'
Manager:
(Portugal) Carlos Queiroz

GK	21	Mostafa Matar
RB	12	Alexander Michel Melki
CB	4	Nour Mansour (c)	(yellow card) 86'	(substituted off) 89'
CB	13	Felix Michel Melki
LB	18	Kassem El Zein
DM	6	Mouhammed-Ali Dhaini
RM	22	Abbas Assi
LM	3	Maher Sabra		(substituted off) 83'
AM	10	Mohamad Haidar		(substituted off) 75'
SS	20	Rabih Ataya		(substituted off) 74'
CF	9	Hilal El-Helwe		(substituted off) 75'
Substitutions:
MF	15	Walid Shour		(substituted on) 74'
MF	14	Nader Matar		(substituted on) 75'
FW	17	Fadel Antar		(substituted on) 75'
DF	16	Hassan Chaitou		(substituted on) 83'
MF	5	Jihad Ayoub		(substituted on) 89'
Manager:
(Czech Republic) Ivan Hašek

Man of the Match:
Amr El Solia (Egypt)

Assistant referees:
Rafael Foltyn (Germany)
Christian Gittelmann (Argentina)
Fourth official:
Andrés Matonte (Uruguay)
Video assistant referee:
Christian Dingert (Germany)
Assistant video assistant referees:
Kevin Blom (Netherlands)
Tomasz Listkiewicz (Poland)
Rafael Traci (Brazil)

=== Lebanon vs Algeria ===
Despite Algeria dominating play, Lebanon brought the first half to a goalless draw thanks to their defending, most notably through their goalkeeper Mostafa Matar and defender Alexander Michel Melki. The second half initially proceeded in a similar fashion to the first, until Youcef Belaïli was brought down in the box by Hussein El Dor; Yacine Brahimi converted the subsequent penalty in the 69th minute. Lebanon reacted from the conceded goal, attempting attacks of their own. In the 78th minute, Houssem Eddine Mrezigue of Algeria was sent off, before Lebanon's Kassem El Zein also got a second yellow card, reducing both teams to 10 men in the final minutes. Following a missed chance by Baghdad Bounedjah one-on-one against the goalkeeper, Algeria doubled their lead in added time after Tayeb Meziani scored from a counterattack.

4 December 2021
16:00

Lebanon	0–2	Algeria
	Report	Brahimi 69' (pen.); Meziani 90+3'

Al Janoub Stadium, Al Wakrah
Attendance: 9,405
Referee: Szymon Marciniak (Poland)

Lebanon	Algeria

GK	21	Mostafa Matar
RB	12	Alexander Michel Melki
CB	4	Nour Mansour (c)		(substituted off) 46'
CB	2	Hussein El Dor		(substituted off) 80'
LB	18	Kassem El Zein	(yellow card) 45' (yellow-red card) 83'
CM	5	Jihad Ayoub		(substituted off) 73'
CM	6	Mouhammed-Ali Dhaini
RW	20	Rabih Ataya	(yellow card) 44'	(substituted off) 73'
AM	14	Nader Matar		(substituted off) 63'
LW	16	Hassan Chaitou
CF	9	Hilal El-Helwe
Substitutions:
DF	3	Maher Sabra		(substituted on) 46'
MF	10	Mohamad Haidar		(substituted on) 63'
MF	13	Felix Michel Melki		(substituted on) 73'
MF	8	Mahdi Zein		(substituted on) 73'
FW	17	Fadel Antar		(substituted on) 80'
Manager:
(Czech Republic) Ivan Hašek

GK	1	Moustapha Zeghba
RB	3	Houcine Benayada
CB	12	Mohamed Amine Tougai
CB	5	Mehdi Tahrat
LB	20	Ilyes Chetti
CM	18	Houssem Eddine Mrezigue	(yellow card) 72' (yellow-red card) 78'
CM	14	Sofiane Bendebka
RW	15	Hillal Soudani		(substituted off) 66'
AM	11	Yacine Brahimi (c)		(substituted off) 80'
LW	10	Youcef Belaïli		(substituted off) 87'
CF	9	Baghdad Bounedjah
Substitutions:
FW	7	Tayeb Meziani		(substituted on) 66'
MF	17	Zakaria Draoui		(substituted on) 80'
FW	22	Zineddine Boutmène		(substituted on) 87'
Manager:
Madjid Bougherra

Man of the Match:
Yacine Brahimi (Algeria)

Assistant referees:
Paweł Sokolnicki (Poland)
Tomasz Listkiewicz (Poland)
Fourth official:
Ryuji Sato (Japan)
Video assistant referee:
Tomasz Kwiatkowski (Poland)
Assistant video assistant referees:
Guillermo Cuadra Fernández (Spain)
Elvis Noupue (Cameroon)
Hiroyuki Kimura (Japan)

=== Sudan vs Egypt ===
4 December 2021
19:00

Sudan	0–5	Egypt
	Report	Refaat 4'; Zizo 13' (pen.); El Wensh 31'; H. Faisal 57'; Sherif 80'

Stadium 974, Doha
Attendance: 14,464
Referee: Matthew Conger (New Zealand)

Sudan	Egypt

GK	1	Ali Abu Eshrein
RB	18	Samawal Merghani		(substituted off) 83'
CB	5	Ahmed Wadah
CB	4	Amir Kamal
LB	3	Faris Abdalla	(yellow card) 50' (yellow-red card) 53'
DM	23	Nasr Eldin El Shigail (c)		(substituted off) 64'
DM	14	Salah Adel		(substituted off) 83'
CM	2	Abuaagla Abdalla
RF	9	Yaser Muzmel	(yellow card) 26'
CF	10	Mohamed Abdelrahman		(substituted off) 58'
LF	22	Al-Jezoli Nouh		(substituted off) 46'
Substitutions:
DF	12	Ahmed Bibo		(substituted on) 46'
DF	6	Mohamed Ering		(substituted on) 58'
DF	15	Ather El Tahir		(substituted on) 64'
MF	21	Walieldin Khedr		(substituted on) 83'
MF	19	Dhiya Mahjoub		(substituted on) 83'
Manager:
(France) Hubert Velud

GK	1	Mohamed El Shenawy
CB	11	Ahmed Hegazi
CB	15	Mahmoud Hamdy		(substituted off) 60'
CB	12	Ayman Ashraf
CM	3	Omar Kamal
CM	4	Amr El Solia (c)
CM	13	Ahmed Fatouh		(substituted off) 73'
RW	21	Ahmed Sayed		(substituted off) 60'
AM	20	Hussein Faisal
LW	7	Ahmed Refaat		(substituted off) 73'
CF	10	Marwan Hamdy		(substituted off) 73'
Substitutions:
MF	8	Mostafa Fathi	(yellow card) 75'	(substituted on) 60'
MF	22	Mohamed Magdy		(substituted on) 60'
FW	19	Osama Faisal		(substituted on) 73'
FW	9	Mohamed Sherif		(substituted on) 73'
DF	6	Marwan Dawoud		(substituted on) 73'
Manager:
(Portugal) Carlos Queiroz

Man of the Match:
Hussein Faisal (Egypt)

Assistant referees:
Tevita Makasini (Tonga)
Bernard Mutukera (Solomon Islands)
Fourth official:
Andrés Matonte (Uruguay)
Video assistant referee:
Kevin Blom (Netherlands)
Assistant video assistant referees:
Christian Dingert (Germany)
Christian Gittelmann (Germany)
Abdulla Ali Al Marri (Qatar)

=== Algeria vs Egypt ===
7 December 2021
22:00

Algeria	1–1	Egypt
Tougai 20'	Report	El Solia 60' (pen.)

Al Janoub Stadium, Al Wakrah
Attendance: 32,418
Referee: Facundo Tello (Argentina)

Algeria	Egypt

GK	23	Raïs M'Bolhi (c)
RB	3	Houcine Benayada
CB	12	Mohamed Amine Tougai	(yellow card) 59'
CB	19	Abdelkader Bedrane
LB	20	Ilyes Chetti
CM	17	Zakaria Draoui	(yellow card) 71'	(substituted off) 90+1'
CM	14	Sofiane Bendebka
RW	7	Tayeb Meziani		(substituted off) 75'
AM	11	Yacine Brahimi
LW	10	Youcef Belaïli	(yellow card) 40'
CF	9	Baghdad Bounedjah		(substituted off) 46'
Substitutions:
FW	15	Hillal Soudani	(yellow card) 90+2'	(substituted on) 46'
FW	22	Zineddine Boutmène		(substituted on) 75'
MF	6	Yacine Titraoui	(red card) 90+6'	(substituted on) 90+1'
Manager:
Madjid Bougherra

GK	1	Mohamed El Shenawy
RB	11	Ahmed Hegazi		(substituted off) 31'
CB	15	Mahmoud Hamdy
CB	5	Hamdy Fathy	(yellow card) 39'
LB	12	Ayman Ashraf		(substituted off) 9'
CM	14	Akram Tawfik	(yellow card) 18'
CM	4	Amr El Solia (c)	(yellow card) 80'	(substituted off) 83'
CM	13	Ahmed Fatouh
AM	20	Hussein Faisal
CF	9	Mohamed Sherif		(substituted off) 83'
CF	10	Marwan Hamdy		(substituted off) 46'
Substitutions:
MF	8	Mostafa Fathi		(substituted on) 9'
DF	2	Ahmed Yassin		(substituted on) 31'
MF	17	Mohanad Lasheen		(substituted on) 46'
DF	3	Omar Kamal		(substituted on) 83'
MF	21	Ahmed Sayed		(substituted on) 83'
Manager:
(Portugal) Carlos Queiroz

Man of the Match:
Yacine Brahimi (Algeria)

Assistant referees:
Ezequiel Brailovsky (Argentina)
Gabriel Chade (Argentina)
Fourth official:
Janny Sikazwe (Zambia)
Video assistant referee:
Guillermo Cuadra Fernández (Spain)
Assistant video assistant referees:
Juan Soto (Venezuela)
Danilo Manis (Brazil)
Rafael Traci (Brazil)

=== Lebanon vs Sudan ===
Lebanon began the first half strong, with Sudanese goalkeeper Ali Abu Eshrein saving a shot from Rabih Ataya and a close-range header from Maher Sabra. Sudan's only attempts did not threaten Lebanon's goal. Ataya was sent off in the 62nd minute, reducing Lebanon to 10 men. Both Lebanon and Sudan came close to scoring in the 70th and 75th minute respectively, with Fadel Antar and Mohamed Ering having their close-range shots saved. Sudan's Ahmed Wadah received a red card in the 76th minute and both teams headed into the last 14 minutes with 10 men each. Lebanon gained the lead the same minute, with Abu Eshrein punching the subsequent free kick cross into his own net. It proved to be the only goal of the game, which ended in a 1–0 win for Lebanon.

7 December 2021
22:00

Lebanon	1–0	Sudan
Abu Eshrein 76' (o.g.)	Report

Education City Stadium, Al Rayyan
Attendance: 5,991
Referee: Fernando Hernández Gómez (Mexico)

Lebanon	Sudan

GK	23	Ali Daher
RB	17	Mohamad Zein Tahan		(substituted off) 90+6'
CB	12	Alexander Michel Melki
CB	13	Felix Michel Melki
LB	3	Maher Sabra
DM	6	Mouhammed-Ali Dhaini	(yellow card) 58'	(substituted off) 73'
RM	16	Hassan Chaitou
LM	8	Mahdi Zein		(substituted off) 73'
AM	10	Mohamad Haidar (c)		(substituted off) 53'
SS	20	Rabih Ataya	(red card) 62'
CF	9	Hilal El-Helwe		(substituted off) 53'
Substitutions:
MF	14	Nader Matar		(substituted on) 53'
FW	17	Fadel Antar		(substituted on) 53'
DF	2	Hussein El Dor		(substituted on) 73'
DF	22	Abbas Assi		(substituted on) 73'
MF	11	Hussein Awada		(substituted on) 90+6'
Manager:
(Czech Republic) Ivan Hašek

GK	1	Ali Abu Eshrein
CB	5	Ahmed Wadah	(red card) 76'
CB	12	Ahmed Bibo
CB	6	Mohamed Ering
RWB	13	Walid Hassan		(substituted off) 57'
LWB	18	Samawal Merghani
DM	14	Salah Adel		(substituted off) 57'
CM	8	Mohamed Al Rashed	(yellow card) 19'
CM	21	Walieldin Khedr		(substituted off) 46'
CF	7	Ramadan Agab (c)
CF	10	Mohamed Abdelrahman		(substituted off) 81'
Substitutions:
MF	2	Abuaagla Abdalla		(substituted on) 46'	(substituted off) 61'
FW	11	Muaaz Al-Quoz		(substituted on) 57'
MF	23	Nasr Eldin El Shigail		(substituted on) 57'
MF	19	Dhiya Mahjoub		(substituted on) 61'
FW	22	Al-Jezoli Nouh		(substituted on) 81'
Manager:
(France) Hubert Velud

Man of the Match:
Felix Michel Melki (Lebanon)

Assistant referees:
Micheal Barwegen (Canada)
Karen Díaz (Mexico)
Fourth official:
Matthew Conger (New Zealand)
Video assistant referee:
Adonai Escobedo (Mexico)
Assistant video assistant referees:
Fernando Guerrero Ramirez (Mexico)
Bruno Pires (Brazil)
Tomasz Kwiatkowski (Poland)
