= Ahmed Yassin (disambiguation) =

Ahmed Yassin (1937–2004), was a Palestinian imam and politician

Ahmed Yassin may also refer to:

- Ahmed Yusuf Yasin (born 1957), Somaliland politician and lawyer
- Ahmed Yasin (footballer) (born 1991), Iraqi football winger
- Ahmed Yassin (footballer) (born 1997), Egyptian football centre-back
