= Ali Sabeh =

Lebanese footballer (born 1994)

- Sabeh with Lebanon in 2024

Personal information
- Full name: Ali Abbas Sabeh
- Date of birth: 24 June 1994 (age 32)
- Place of birth: Bourj el-Barajneh, Lebanon
- Height: 1.86 m (6 ft 1 in)
- Position: Goalkeeper

Team information
- Current team: Jwaya
- Number: 1

Youth career
- 2008–2010: Irshad
- 2010–2012: Nejmeh

Senior career*
Years	Team	Apps	(Gls)
2012–2025	Nejmeh	102	(0)
2016–2017	→ Ahli Saida (loan)		
2025	Ahed	11	(0)
2025–	Jwaya	24	(0)

International career^{‡}
2013	Lebanon U20		
2014–	Lebanon	9	(0)
- * Club domestic league appearances and goals as of 09:15, 3 August 2026 (UTC) ‡ National team caps and goals as of 31 December 2023

Ali Abbas Sabeh (Arabic: علي عباس السبع, Lebanese Arabic pronunciation: [ˈʕali sˈsab(ə)ʕ]; born 24 June 1994) is a Lebanese footballer who plays as a goalkeeper for Lebanese Premier League club Jwaya and the Lebanon national team.

== Club career ==
Sabeh with Nejmeh in 2019

Born in Bourj el-Barajneh, Lebanon, Sabeh started his football career in 2008 at the youth sector of local club Irshad. In 2010 he moved to Nejmeh's youth sector, and made his professional debut in 2012. After having played 15 years with Nejmeh, Sabeh announced his departure from the club in February 2025, citing personal reasons. On 16 March 2025, he signed for Ahed. Shortly after, on 16 July 2025, Sabeh joined newly promoted club Jwaya.

== International career ==
Sabeh was called up to the Lebanon national under-20 team for the 2013 Jeux de la Francophonie.

Sabeh was first called up to the Lebanon national team in October 2014, as part of a mixed squad of senior and Olympic players for friendly matches against Qatar and Saudi Arabia. He made his debut against the United Arab Emirates on 6 November, in a 3–2 defeat.

In July 2019, he was called up for the 2019 WAFF Championship squad, but withdrew injured and was replaced by Ali Daher on 31 July. Sabeh's second cap came on 7 December 2021, over seven years from his debut, keeping a clean sheet in a 1–0 win over Sudan in the 2021 FIFA Arab Cup. In December 2023, Sabeh was included in the Lebanese squad for the 2023 AFC Asian Cup.

== Personal life ==
Sabeh has three daughters.

== Career statistics ==
=== International ===
As of match played 12 October 2023

Appearances and goals by national team and year
National team	Year	Apps	Goals
Lebanon	2014	1	0
Lebanon	2015	0	0
Lebanon	2016	0	0
Lebanon	2017	0	0
Lebanon	2018	0	0
Lebanon	2019	0	0
Lebanon	2020	0	0
Lebanon	2021	1	0
Lebanon	2022	0	0
Lebanon	2023	7	0
Total		9	0

== Honours ==
Nejmeh

- Lebanese Premier League: 2023–24
- Lebanese FA Cup: 2021–22, 2022–23
- Lebanese Elite Cup: 2017, 2018, 2021
- Lebanese Super Cup: 2023, 2024
