= Antoine Al Douaihy =

Lebanese footballer (born 1999)

- Al Douaihy with Salam Zgharta in 2020

Personal information
- Full name: Antoine Kabalan Knaier Al Douaihy
- Date of birth: 18 March 1999 (age 27)
- Place of birth: Zgharta, Lebanon
- Height: 1.96 m (6 ft 5 in)
- Position: Goalkeeper

Team information
- Current team: Safa (on loan from Nejmeh)
- Number: 99

Youth career
- Salam Zgharta

Senior career*
Years	Team	Apps	(Gls)
2016–2024	Salam Zgharta	51	(0)
2016–2017	→ Amal Salam Zgharta (loan)	6	(0)
2023	→ Bourj (loan)	0	(0)
2024–	Nejmeh	8	(0)
2026–	→ Safa (loan)	0	(0)

International career^{‡}
2017	Lebanon U19	2	(0)
2021	Lebanon U23	2	(0)
2023–	Lebanon	1	(0)
- * Club domestic league appearances and goals as of 10:12, 3 August 2026 (UTC) ‡ National team caps and goals as of 25 June 2023

Antoine Kabalan Knaier Al Douaihy (Arabic: انطوان قبلان قنيعر الدويهي; born 18 March 1999) is a Lebanese footballer who plays as a goalkeeper for Lebanese Premier League club Safa, on loan from Nejmeh, and the Lebanon national team.

== Club career ==
=== Salam Zgharta ===
Growing up a Salam Zgharta fan, Al Douaihy signed for their youth academy and progressed through the ranks. In July 2016 he moved to Amal Salam Zgharta, Salam's reserve team in the Lebanese Third Division, playing six league games in the 2016–17 season.

The following season, in 2017–18, Al Douaihy was made part of Salam's first team in the Lebanese Premier League as the third-choice goalkeeper. He made his debut in the 2018–19 season, coming on as a substitute to replace an injured Mostafa Matar in a 5–2 defeat to Ansar. Al Douaihy became a starter for Salam Zgharta during the 2022–23 season, in which he played 19 games.

==== Loan to Bourj ====
Following the end of the season, in which Salam finished 11th and were relegated, Al Douaihy was loaned out to Bourj to participate in the 2023 Arab Club Champions Cup in April. He played against Emirati club Al Wahda in the second leg of the first qualifying round in which, despite the 1–0 defeat, he was praised for his performance.

=== Nejmeh and Safa ===
In September 2024, ahead of the 2024–25 season, Douaihy moved to Nejmeh on a five-year contract. He joined Safa on loan on 14 August 2026, as part of a swap deal with Nejmeh involving Ali Hallal.

== International career ==
Al Douaihy represented Lebanon internationally at under-19 and under-23 levels, captaining the U19 team at the 2018 AFC U-19 Championship qualification in Qatar.

Al Douaihy was included in Lebanon's 23-man list for the 2021 FIFA Arab Cup in Qatar following Ali Daher's injury; he did not make an appearance. On 25 June 2023, he made his international senior debut in a 4–1 win against Bhutan in the 2023 SAFF Championship.

== Style of play ==
Al Douaihy was noted as a promising goalkeeper in his youth.

== Career statistics ==
=== International ===
As of match played 25 June 2023

Appearances and goals by national team and year
National team	Year	Apps	Goals
Lebanon	2023	1	0
Total		1	0

== Honours ==
Nejmeh

- Lebanese FA Cup: 2025–26
