= Moataz Yaseen =

Jordanian footballer

Personal information
- Full name: Moataz Yaseen Mahjoub Al-Fityani
- Date of birth: 3 November 1982 (age 44)
- Place of birth: Amman, Jordan
- Height: 1.88 m (6 ft 2 in)
- Position: Goalkeeper

Youth career
- 1998–2000: Al-Ahli

Senior career*
Years	Team	Apps	(Gls)
2000–2004	Al-Ahli	70	(0)
2004–2013	Shabab Al-Ordon	172	(1)
2013–2016	That Ras	63	(0)
2016–2021	Al-Faisaly		
2021–2023	Al-Salt		

International career
2009–2021	Jordan	25	(0)
- * Club domestic league appearances and goals

Moataz Yaseen Mahjoub Al-Fityani (Arabic: معتز ياسين محجوب الفتياني; born 3 November 1982) is a Jordanian retired footballer who last played as a goalkeeper for Al-Salt and the Jordan national football team.

== Club career ==
Moataz first began his career as a defender until the age of 15 when he then changed to becoming a goalkeeper.

== International career ==
Moataz played his first international match against Bahrain in an international friendly on 3 June 2009, which Jordan lost 4–0.

== International career statistics ==
As of 4 September 2021

Jordan national team
Year	Apps	Goals
2009	2	0
2014	3	0
2015	4	0
2016	5	0
2017	3	0
2018	1	0
2019	2	0
2020	0	0
2021	4	0
Total	25	0

== Honours ==
Shabab Al-Ordon

- AFC Cup (1): 2007
- Jordan Premier League (2): 2005–06, 2012–13
- Jordan FA Cup (2): 2005–06, 2006–07
- Jordan FA Shield (1): 2007
- Jordan Super Cup (2): 2007, 2013

Al-Faisaly

- Jordan Premier League (1): 2016–17
- Jordan FA Cup (1): 2016–17

== Personal life and family ==
Moataz's father Yaseen is a former coach of the Jordan national boxing team, and has a brother named Mahmoud who used to play as a goalkeeper for Al-Wehdat. Moataz is married and has a son named Ayham.
