= Ahmed Refaat =

Egyptian footballer (1993–2024)

- Refaat with the Egypt national football team

Personal information
- Full name: Ahmed El Sayed Refaat Ahmed
- Date of birth: 20 June 1993
- Place of birth: Ibshan, Bila, Kafr El Sheikh, Egypt
- Date of death: 6 July 2024 (aged 31)
- Place of death: Cairo, Egypt
- Height: 1.80 m (5 ft 11 in)
- Position: Winger

Youth career
- ENPPI

Senior career*
Years	Team	Apps	(Gls)
2013–2016	ENPPI	48	(12)
2016–2020	Zamalek	19	(4)
2019	→ ENPPI (loan)	13	(2)
2019–2020	→ Al Ittihad (loan)	23	(7)
2020–2021	Al Masry	30	(8)
2021–2024	Future / Modern Future	40	(10)
2022–2023	→ Al Wahda (loan)	6	(1)
Total		179	(44)

International career
2013	Egypt U20	7	(0)
2013–2022	Egypt	7	(2)
Medal record
Men's association football
Representing Egypt
U-20 Africa Cup of Nations
Gold medal – first place	2013 Algeria	Team
- * Club domestic league appearances and goals

Ahmed El Sayed Refaat Ahmed (Arabic: أَحْمَد السَّيِّد رِفْعَت أَحْمَد; 20 June 1993 – 6 July 2024) was an Egyptian footballer who played mainly as a winger.

He made his debut for ENPPI in 2013, coming from the youth academy, and quickly established a place for himself in the club's starting line-ups. He joined Zamalek in 2016, and won the Egyptian Super Cup during his spell with the club, before joining his former club ENPPI and Al Ittihad on loan. In 2020, he joined Al Masry but depated a year later to join newly promoted side Future (later renamed Modern Future), guiding the team to win the inaugural Egyptian League Cup trophy in 2022, and to qualify for the CAF Confederation Cup in 2023. He had a loan spell at UAE club Al Wahda in 2022.

Refaat represented Egypt at youth and senior level. He was part of the winning squad of the 2013 African U-20 Championship and played at the 2021 FIFA Arab Cup. He died on the morning of 6 July 2024, aged 31, due to heart attack and sudden cardiac arrest.

== Club career ==
Refaat started his career with ENPPI. In 2016, he joined Zamalek but was loaned back to ENPPI and then to Al Ittihad in 2019. In November 2020, he transferred to Al Masry, but a year later, joined Modern Future. He had a loan spell at Al Wahda in 2022, which was abruptly cancelled after a few months. He returned to Future where he played until his death in 2024.

On 11 March 2024, during a league match against Al Ittihad, Refaat lost consciousness and was taken to the hospital. He had suffered a heart attack due to a rare medical condition but regained consciousness a week later.

=== Al Wahda controversy ===
Following Refaat's death, his brother and his agent claimed that Ahmed Diab, the then-owner of Future and eventual president of the Egyptian Premier League, refused to correctly organize Refaat's travel permits to complete his move to Al Wahda, leading to a row between Refaat and Egyptian government officials, who argued Refaat had not been given the requisite permission to travel as he had not yet completed military service. Upon returning to Egypt, Refaat was imprisoned for two months at a military barracks, but was able to train with military-backed club Tala'ea El Gaish.

Diab denied refusing to authorise Refaat's travel documents, stating Refaat had clearance to travel to Liberia to play a friendly with Future before moving to the UAE, while government officials reiterated the permits for players departing Egypt who had not yet completed military service is organised by their clubs. Refaat's legal representatives suggested his unexpected departure from Ghana (as a transit country) instead of Liberia into the UAE meant he was not permitted to travel, while the documents did not cover the length of his loan move. He returned to Egypt by January 2023, after featuring a handful of times for Al Wahda.

== Death ==
Refaat died of a heart attack in Cairo, on 6 July 2024, at the age of 31.

== Career statistics ==
Scores and results list Egypt's goal tally first, score column indicates score after each Refaat goal.

List of international goals scored by Ahmed Refaat
No.	Date	Venue	Opponent	Score	Result	Competition
1	4 December 2021	Stadium 974, Doha, Qatar	Sudan	1–0	5–0	2021 FIFA Arab Cup
2	11 December 2021	Al Janoub Stadium, Al Wakrah, Qatar	Jordan	2–1	3–1 (a.e.t.)	2021 FIFA Arab Cup

== Honours ==
Zamalek

- Egyptian Super Cup: 2017

Future

- Egyptian League Cup: 2022

Egypt U20

- African U-20 Championship: 2013

== See also ==
- List of association footballers who died while playing
