= Marwan Dawoud =

Egyptian footballer (born 1997)

Personal information
- Full name: Marwan Mohamed Moustafa Dawoud Soliman
- Date of birth: 27 August 1997 (age 29)
- Place of birth: Egypt
- Height: 1.81 m (5 ft 11 in)
- Position: Defender

Team information
- Current team: ENPPI
- Number: 18

Youth career
- Al Ahly

Senior career*
Years	Team	Apps	(Gls)
2021–	ENPPI	6	(0)

International career
2021-	Egypt	2	(1)
- * Club domestic league appearances and goals

Marwan Mohamed Moustafa Dawoud Soliman (born 27 August 1997) is an Egyptian professional footballer who plays as a defender for the Egyptian national team. His current Club is ENPPI SC.

== International career ==
He was included in the final-23 squad to participate for the 2021 FIFA Arab Cup on 20 November 2021., as he debuted 1 December in a match against Lebanon in a 1–0 victory.

On 11 December, Dawoud scored his first goal for Egypt against Jordan at extra-time in a 3–1 victory.

=== International goals ===
No	Date	Venue	Opponent	Score	Result	Competition
1.	11 December 2021	Al Janoub Stadium, Al Wakrah, Qatar	Jordan	3–1	3–1 (a.e.t.)	2021 FIFA Arab Cup
