= Mohamed Ering =

Sudanese footballer

Muhamed Ering
Personal information
- Full name: Muhamed Ahmed Saeed Ahmed Elfadul
- Date of birth: 20 October 1997 (age 29)
- Place of birth: Sudan
- Height: 1.81 m (5 ft 11 in)
- Position: Centre-back

Team information
- Current team: Al-Hilal SC
- Number: 6

Senior career*
Years	Team	Apps	(Gls)
2016–2017	Al-Mugren SC (Khartoum)		
2017	Burri SC		
2018–2020	Hilal Alsahil SC		
2020–	Al-Hilal SC		

International career^{‡}
2021–	Sudan	38	(0)
- * Club domestic league appearances and goals as of 11 October 2021 ‡ National team caps and goals as of 3 January 2026

Mohamed Ahmed Saeed Ahmed Elfadul (born 20 October 1997), also known as Mohamed Ering, is a Sudanese professional footballer who plays as a centre-back for Al-Hilal SC and the Sudan national football team.
