= Ali Abu Eshrein =

Sudanese footballer

Ali Abu-Eshrein
Personal information
- Full name: Ali Abdallah Abu-Eshrein Darasha
- Date of birth: 6 December 1989 (age 36)
- Place of birth: Sudan
- Height: 1.80 m (5 ft 11 in)
- Position: Goalkeeper

Senior career*
Years	Team	Apps	(Gls)
2009–2016	Al-Nesoor SC		
2016	Al-Amir SC (Bahri)		
2017–2020	Al-Merrikh SC		
2017	→ Alamal SC Atbara (loan)		
2018	→ Al-Shurta SC (Al-Qadaref) (loan)		
2020–2026	Al-Hilal SC		
2026-	Al-Hilal ESC (Al-Fasher)		

International career^{‡}
2019–2025	Sudan	35	(0)
- * Club domestic league appearances and goals as of 8 July 2026 ‡ National team caps and goals as of 25 March 2025

Ali Abdallah Abu-Eshrein Darasha (born 6 December 1989) is a Sudanese footballer who plays as a goalkeeper for Al-Hilal SC and the Sudan national football team.
