= Maher Sabra =

Lebanese footballer (born 1992)

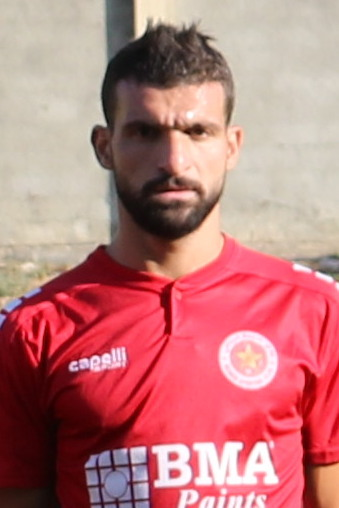
- Sabra with Nejmeh in 2020

Personal information
- Full name: Maher Mohammed Sabra
- Date of birth: 14 January 1992 (age 34)
- Place of birth: Bourj el-Barajneh, Lebanon
- Height: 1.89 m (6 ft 2 in)
- Position: Defender

Team information
- Current team: Safa
- Number: 24

Youth career
- 2009–2013: Nejmeh
- 2010–2011: → Homenmen (loan)

Senior career*
Years	Team	Apps	(Gls)
2013–2026	Nejmeh	131	(8)
2025–2026	→ Safa (loan)	20	(1)
2026–	Safa	0	(0)

International career^{‡}
2016–2024	Lebanon	23	(1)
- * Club domestic league appearances and goals as of 3 July 2026 ‡ National team caps and goals as of 11 June 2024

Maher Mohammed Sabra (Arabic: ماهر محمد صبرا; born 14 January 1992) is a Lebanese footballer who plays as a defender for Lebanese Premier League club Safa.

== Club career ==
Sabra joined Nejmeh's youth system in 2009, and spent the 2010–11 season on loan with Homenmen's youth team. He made his senior debut for Nejmeh in 2012.

On 30 May 2022, with his contract due to expire the following day, Nejmeh renewed Sabra's contract for five years. In July 2023, Sabra underwent surgery on his hand following an injury sustained the previous day. His contract was extended on 9 September 2024, for two seasons.

In September 2025, Sabra was sent on a one-year loan to Safa. The deal was made permanent in August 2026.

== International career ==
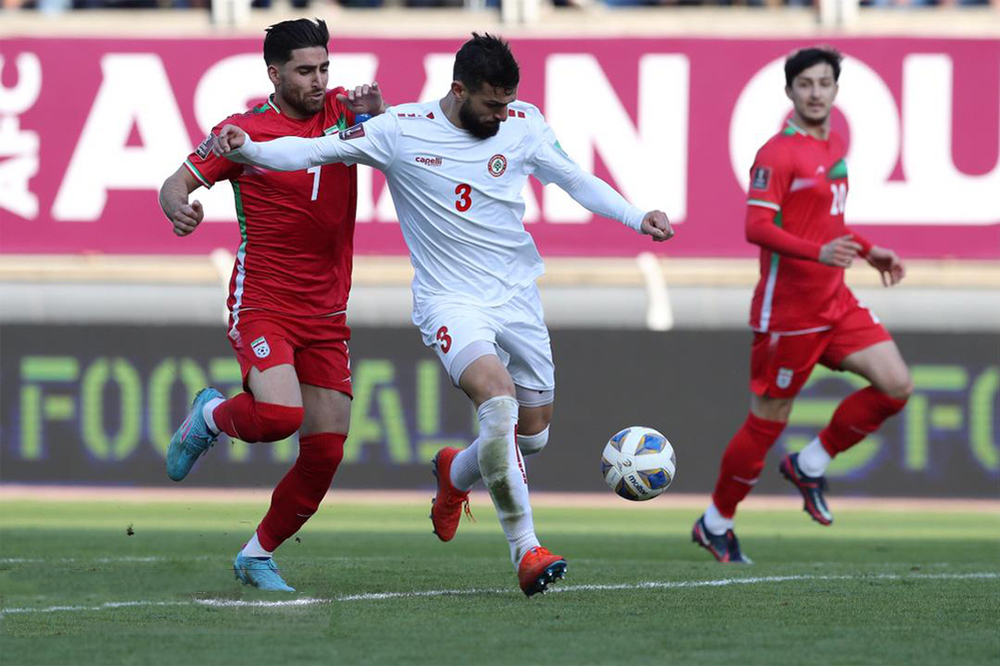
Sabra with the Lebanon national team against Iran in 2022

Sabra made his international debut for Lebanon on 31 August 2016, coming on as an 81st-minute substitute in a 1–1 friendly draw against Jordan. He scored his first international goal on 1 February 2022, helping his side draw 1–1 against Iraq in the 2022 FIFA World Cup qualifiers. In December 2023, Sabra was included in the Lebanese squad for the 2023 AFC Asian Cup.

== Personal life ==
In addition to being a footballer, Sabra worked eight hours a day as an air conditioner repairman in 2020. In 2022, he opened a clothing store. Sabra has a son named Fadel (b. 2022).

Sabra was involved in the sports docuseries Captains, produced by Fulwell 73 and shown on Netflix and FIFA+ in 2022, which documented six national teams and their captains in their respective 2022 FIFA World Cup qualification campaign.

== Career statistics ==
=== International ===
As of match played 11 June 2024

Appearances and goals by national team and year
National team	Year	Apps	Goals
Lebanon	2016	2	0
Lebanon	2017	1	0
Lebanon	2018	0	0
Lebanon	2019	0	0
Lebanon	2020	1	0
Lebanon	2021	8	0
Lebanon	2022	5	1
Lebanon	2023	2	0
Lebanon	2024	4	0
Total		23	1

Scores and results list Lebanon's goal tally first, score column indicates score after each Sabra goal.

List of international goals scored by Maher Sabra
No.	Date	Venue	Opponent	Score	Result	Competition
1	1 February 2022	Saida Municipal Stadium, Sidon, Lebanon	Iraq	1–1	1–1	2022 FIFA World Cup qualification

== Honours ==
Nejmeh

- Lebanese Premier League: 2013–14, 2023–24
- Lebanese FA Cup: 2015–16, 2021–22, 2022–23
- Lebanese Elite Cup: 2014, 2016, 2017, 2018, 2021
- Lebanese Super Cup: 2014, 2016, 2023, 2024
