= Samawal Merghani =

Sudanese footballer

Personal information
- Full name: Samawal Merghani Noureldin Elyas
- Date of birth: 22 October 1991 (age 35)
- Place of birth: Al-Nuhud, North Kordofan, Sudan
- Height: 1.75 m (5 ft 9 in)
- Position: Right back

Senior career*
Years	Team	Apps	(Gls)
2007–2008	Al-Taj SC (Al-Nuhud)		
2009–2013	Al-Nesoor SC		
2014–2016	Al Khartoum SC		
2017-2022	Al-Hilal Club		
2022-2024	Al Ahli SC (Khartoum)		
2024	Al-Tayaran SC (Benina)		
2024-2025	Al-Ahly SC (Misrata)		

International career
2018–2021	Sudan	26	(1)
Medal record
Men's football
Representing Sudan
African Nations Championship
Third place	2018 Morocco
- * Club domestic league appearances and goals

Samawal Merghani Noureldin Elyas (born 22 October 1991) is a Sudanese professional footballer who plays as a defender for Al Ahli SC (Khartoum) and the Sudan national football team.

== Honours ==
Sudan

- African Nations Championship: 3rd place, 2018
