= Muaaz Al-Quoz =

Sudanese footballer

Muaaz Al-Quoe
Personal information
- Full name: Muaaz Abdelraheem Gesmallah Abdelrahman
- Date of birth: 25 April 1989 (age 37)
- Place of birth: Sudan
- Height: 1.80 m (5 ft 11 in)
- Position: Forward

Team information
- Current team: Al-Nejm Alreefy SC (Misrata)
- Number: 11

Senior career*
Years	Team	Apps	(Gls)
2010-2012	Hay Al-Arab SC		
2013-2016	Al Khartoum SC		
2017-2020	El-Hilal SC El-Obeid		
2019–2022	Al Khartoum SC		
2022	Alamal SC Atbara		
2022-2023	Al Ahli SC (Khartoum)		
2023-2024	Haidoub SC (Al-Nehoud)		
2024	Al-Nojoom SC (Ajdabiya)		
2024-	Al-Nejm Alreefy SC (Misrata)		

International career^{‡}
2013–2021	Sudan	37	(3)
Medal record
Men's football
Representing Sudan
African Nations Championship
Third place	2018 Morocco
- * Club domestic league appearances and goals as of 11 November 2024 ‡ National team caps and goals as of 7 December 2021

Muaaz Abdelraheem Gesmallah Abdelrahman (born 25 April 1989) is a Sudanese professional footballer who plays as a forward for Khartoum NC and the Sudan national football team.

== Honours ==
Sudan

- African Nations Championship: 3rd place, 2018
