= Dhiya Mahjoub =

Sudanese footballer (born 1995)

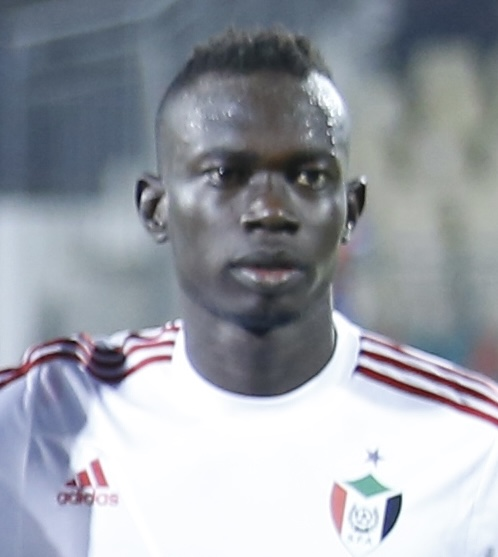
- Mahjoub with Sudan in 2022

Personal information
- Full name: Dhiya Eddin Mahjoub Musa Kano
- Date of birth: 30 May 1995 (age 31)
- Place of birth: Khartoum, Sudan
- Height: 1.77 m (5 ft 10 in)
- Position: Midfielder

Team information
- Current team: Al-Ahli SC (Wad Madani)
- Number: 21

Senior career*
| Years | Team | Apps | (Gls) |
| 2014–2016 | Al-Emtedad | | |
| 2016–2017 | Alamal SC Atbara | | |
| 2018–2024 | Al-Merrikh SC | | |
| 2024 | Al Khums SC | | |
| 2024–2025 | Al Tahaddy SC | | |
| 2025–2026 | Al-Borouq SC | | |
| 2026– | Al-Ahli SC (Wad Madani) | | |

International career^{‡}
| 2020–2022 | Sudan | 21 | (0) |
- * Club domestic league appearances and goals as of 22 July 2026 ‡ National team caps and goals as of 8 June 2022

Dhiya Eddin Mahjoub Musa Kano (Arabic: ضياء الدين محجوب موسى كانو; born 30 May 1995) is a Sudanese professional footballer who plays as a midfielder for Al-Ahli SC (Wad Madani) and the Sudan national football team.
