= Nasr Eldin El Shigail =

Sudanese footballer

Personal information
- Full name: Nasr Eldin Omer Ahmed Abdalla El Shighail
- Date of birth: 7 April 1985 (age 41)
- Place of birth: Khartoum, Khartoum State, Sudan
- Height: 1.82 m (6 ft 0 in)
- Position: Midfielder

Senior career*
Years	Team	Apps	(Gls)
2004	Al-Deim Wast SC (Khartoum)		
2005–2006	Al-Alamein SC (Khartoum)		
2007–2012	Al-Merrikh SC		
2013–2022	Al-Hilal Club		
2017	→ Al-Hilal SC (Al-Ubayyid) (loan)		
2022-2023	Al-Naser SC (Omdurman)		

International career^{‡}
2007–2021	Sudan	69	(0)
Medal record
Men's football
Representing Sudan
African Nations Championship
Third place	2018 Morocco
CECAFA Cup
Winner	2007 Tanzania
- * Club domestic league appearances and goals as of 30 October 2012 ‡ National team caps and goals as of 24 June 2024

Nasr Eldin Omer Ahmed Abdalla El Shighail is a Sudanese footballer who plays as a midfielder.

== Honours ==
Al-Merrikh

- Sudan Premier League: 2008, 2011
- Sudan Cup: 2007, 2008, 2010, 2012

Al-Hilal Club

- Sudan Premier League: 2014, 2016, 2020–21, 2021-22
- Sudan Cup: 2016, 2021-22

Sudan

- African Nations Championship: 3rd place, 2018
- CECAFA Cup: 2007
