= Hussein Awada (footballer, born 2000) =

Lebanese footballer (born 2000)

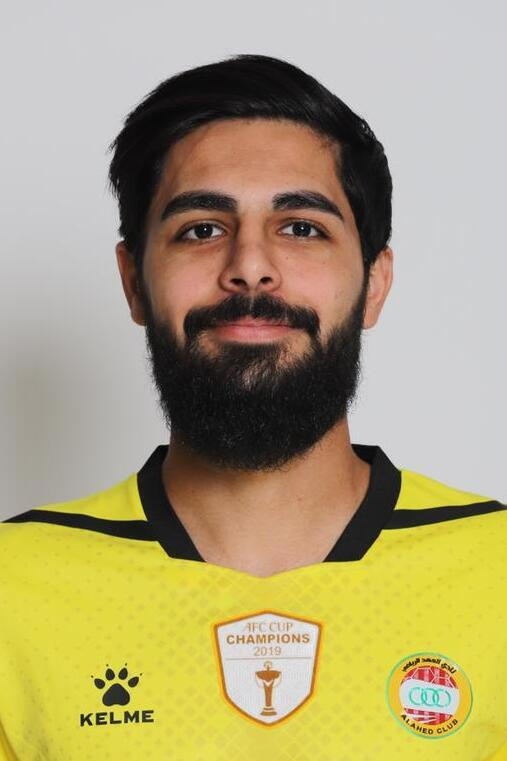
- Awada with Ahed in 2021

Personal information
- Full name: Hussein Ali Awada
- Date of birth: 1 January 2000 (age 26)
- Place of birth: Nabatieh, Lebanon
- Height: 1.75 m (5 ft 9 in)
- Position: Midfielder

Team information
- Current team: Akhaa Ahli Aley
- Number: 8

Youth career
- Ahed

Senior career*
Years	Team	Apps	(Gls)
2019–2023	Ahed	0	(0)
2019–2021	→ Shabab Bourj (loan)	15	(3)
2021–2022	→ Shabab Bourj (loan)	15	(5)
2022–2023	→ Shabab Sahel (loan)	18	(2)
2023–2025	Shabab Sahel	42	(2)
2025–2026	Jwaya	11	(2)
2026–	Akhaa Ahli Aley	0	(0)

International career^{‡}
2021	Lebanon U23	5	(0)
2021	Lebanon	1	(0)
- * Club domestic league appearances and goals as of 1 August 2026 ‡ National team caps and goals as of 20:56, 7 December 2021 (UTC)

Hussein Ali Awada (Arabic: حسين علي عواضة; born 1 January 2000) is a Lebanese footballer who plays as a midfielder for Lebanese Premier League club Akhaa Ahli Aley.

== Club career ==
In summer 2019, Awada was loaned from Ahed to Shabab Bourj. After returning to Ahed to compete in the 2021 AFC Cup and 2021 Lebanese Elite Cup, he was loaned back to Shabab Bourj in summer 2021 for one season. On 28 June 2022, Awada joined Shabab Sahel on a one-year loan.

On 30 July 2025, Awada joined newly promoted club Jwaya on a three-year contract. He departed Jwaya on 6 August 2026, and joined Akhaa Ahli Aley on 19 August.

== International career ==
Having represented Lebanon at under-23 level, Awada made his senior debut on 7 December 2021, as a substitute in a 1–0 win against Sudan in the 2021 FIFA Arab Cup.

== Style of play ==
Awada is a box-to-box midfielder.

== Career statistics ==
=== International ===
As of match played 7 December 2021

Appearances and goals by national team and year
National team	Year	Apps	Goals
Lebanon	2021	1	0
Total		1	0
