= Ahmed Wadah =

Sudanese footballer

Personal information
- Full name: Ahmed Ibrahim Ahmed Al-Nour
- Date of birth: 12 February 2000 (age 26)
- Place of birth: Wau, Sudan
- Height: 1.88 m (6 ft 2 in)
- Position: Centre back

Team information
- Current team: Asaria SC
- Number: 18

Senior career*
Years	Team	Apps	(Gls)
2016–2017	Al-Esaaf SC (Nyala)		
2018	Al-Merrikh SC (Nyala)		
2018-2020	El-Hilal SC El-Obeid		
2020-2023	Al-Hilal Club		
2024	Al-Sawaed SC (Benghazi)		
2024-2026	Asaria SC		
2026-	Al-Gash SC (Kassala)		

International career^{‡}
2019–2021	Sudan	15	(0)
- * Club domestic league appearances and goals as of 31 October 2026 ‡ National team caps and goals as of 28 April 2024

Ahmed Ibrahim Ahmed Al-Nour (born 12 February 2000) is a Sudanese professional footballer who plays as a defender for Al-Hilal Omdurman and the Sudan national football team.
