= Al Janoub Stadium =

Stadium in Al Wakrah, Qatar

Al-Janoub Stadium
- ملعب الجنوب
- Interactive map of Al-Janoub Stadium
- Full name: Al-Janoub Stadium
- Former names: Al-Wakrah Stadium (May-June 2019)
- Location: Al Wakrah, Qatar
- Coordinates: 25°09′35″N 51°34′27″E
- Owner: Qatar Football Association
- Capacity: 44,325
- Roof: Retractable
- Surface: Grass
- Record attendance: 43,443 (Ghana vs Uruguay, 2 December 2022)
- Field size: 105 x 68 m

Construction
- Groundbreaking: 2014
- Built: 2014–2019
- Opened: 16 May 2019
- Renovated: 2019
- Architect: Zaha Hadid
- Services engineer: Jain and Partners
- Main contractor: Midmac Contracting Co. Six Construct Qatar Porr Qatar Construction

Tenants
- Al-Wakrah SC (2020–present); Qatar national football team (selected matches)

Al-Janoub Stadium (Arabic: استاد الجنوب, romanized: Istād al-Janūb, lit. 'Stadium of the South'), formerly known as Al-Wakrah Stadium (Arabic: استاد الوكرة), is a retractable-roof football stadium in al-Wakrah, Qatar that was inaugurated on 16 May 2019. This was the second of the eight stadiums inaugurated for the 2022 FIFA World Cup in Qatar, after the renovation of Khalifa International Stadium. It was designed by Iraqi-British architect Zaha Hadid (1950–2016) together with the firms AECOM and Jain & Partners of Dubai.

The stadium features a curvilinear postmodernist and neo-futurist design. The appearance of the roof was inspired by the sails of traditional dhows used by pearl divers from the region, weaving through currents of the Persian Gulf.

It is the official headquarters of the football club Al-Wakrah SC, where the matches of the Qatar Stars League are held. The capacity of the stadium is 20,000; the capacity was 40,000 before the World Cup.

The stadium is located about 22 km (14 mi) south of Doha.

== History ==
Interior view of the stadium during a visit by Jair Bolsonaro in October 2019.

Qatar was chosen to host the 2022 FIFA World Cup in 2010, becoming the first Muslim country and the first country in the Middle East to host the World Cup. Qatar previously did not have the sporting capability for the Cup, and 8 new stadiums were built for the Cup.

The stadium was inaugurated on 16 May 2019, during the 2019 Amir Cup final between Al Sadd SC and Al-Duhail SC played in front of an audience of 38,678 people, making it the second stadium to be completed after Khalifa International Stadium. This match was attended by the Emir (head of state) of Qatar, Sheikh Tamim bin Hamad Al Thani.

The stadium hosted a semifinal match at the 24th Arabian Gulf Cup.

In December 2020, Al Janoub Stadium hosted the 2020 AFC Champions League Final.

The stadium hosted six matches of the 2021 FIFA Arab Cup.

== Design ==
Stadium exterior in 2022.

The stadium's facade near completion. January 2019.

The stadium was designed by the architect Zaha Hadid, and her architectural firm, Zaha Hadid Architects. Zaha Hadid Architects stated that “The stadium was designed in conjunction with a new precinct so that it sits at the heart of an urban extension of the city, creating community-based activities in and around the stadium on non-event days.”

According to the designers, the stadium's exterior was inspired by the sails of traditional Dhow boats, used by pearl divers from the region, weaving through currents of the Persian Gulf. The curvilinear roof and exterior references Al Wakrah's history of seafaring, additionally giving spectators the feeling on being on a ship. Bowed beams hold up the roof, resembling a ship's hull. The building is meant to resemble upturned dhow hulls arranged in a huddle to provide shade and shelter. Many observers have pointed out that the design resembles female genitalia—a claim Zaha Hadid dismissed as "embarrassing" and "ridiculous." The roof of the stadium is retractable, and is made from pleated PTFE fabric and cables, with the roof arches being 230 metres (750 ft) long.

The cooling system prevents the stadium's users from overheating, due to Qatar's hot and arid climate. It is capable of cooling the spectator areas to 18 °C (64 °F) and the field of play to 20 °C (68 °F). According to Qatar's Supreme Committee for Delivery & Legacy (SC), "detailed micro-climate analysis informed the arena's shape, with aerodynamics and optimal shading from the roof, which incorporates a minimal amount of glass, making a significant contribution to temperature control."

== Facilities ==
The sports complex includes a multipurpose room, with swimming pools and spas and a shopping center with green roofs. The entrance to the stadium will be on a wooded square.

A school, wedding hall, cycling, horse riding and running tracks, restaurants, marketplaces and gyms within the vicinity are planned to be built to accompany Al Janoub Stadium.

== Proposed renovations ==
After the 2022 FIFA World Cup, Al Janoub Stadium is the Al-Wakrah SC's home, instead of the current Saoud bin Abdulrahman Stadium. The seating capacity is planned to be halved from 40,000 to 20,000 and used for Qatar Stars League matches. Qatar Supreme Committee for Delivery & Legacy has claimed that the remaining half of the stadium's seats will be donated to developing countries in need of sporting infrastructure.

== Recent tournament results ==
=== 24th Arabian Gulf Cup ===
Date	Time	Team #1	Result	Team #2	Round	Attendance
5 December 2019	20ː00	Saudi Arabia	1–0	Qatar	Semifinals	42,025

=== 2021 FIFA Arab Cup ===
Date	Time	Team #1	Result	Team #2	Round	Attendance
30 November 2021	16ː00	Iraq	1–1	Oman	Group A	1,576
1 December 2021	19ː00	Morocco	4–0	Palestine	Group C	3,843
4 December 2021	16ː00	Lebanon	0–2	Algeria	Group D	9,405
6 December 2021	18ː00	Syria	1–2	Mauritania	Group B	8,539
7 December 2021	22ː00	Algeria	1–1	Egypt	Group D	32,418
11 December 2021	18ː00	Egypt	3–1	Jordan	Quarterfinals	28,306

=== 2022 FIFA World Cup ===
The Al Janoub Stadium hosted seven matches during the 2022 FIFA World Cup.

Date	Time	Team No. 1	Result	Team No. 2	Round	Attendance
22 November 2022	22:00	France	4–1	Australia	Group D	40,875
24 November 2022	13:00	Switzerland	1–0	Cameroon	Group G	39,089
26 November 2022	13:00	Tunisia	0–1	Australia	Group D	41,823
28 November 2022	13:00	Cameroon	3–3	Serbia	Group G	39,789
30 November 2022	18:00	Australia	1–0	Denmark	Group D	41,232
2 December 2022	18:00	Ghana	0–2	Uruguay	Group H	43,443
5 December 2022	18:00	Japan	1–1 (a.e.t.) (1–3 p)	Croatia	Round of 16	42,523

=== 2023 AFC Asian Cup ===
On 5 April 2023, the Al Janoub Stadium was chosen as one of eight (then nine) venues for the 2023 AFC Asian Cup. It hosted six matches.

Date	Time	Team No. 1	Result	Team No. 2	Round	Attendance
15 January 2024	20:30	Malaysia	0–4	Jordan	Group E	20,410
18 January 2024	20:30	Palestine	1–1	United Arab Emirates	Group C	41,986
23 January 2024	14:30	Australia	1–1	Uzbekistan	Group B	15,290
25 January 2024	14:30	South Korea	3–3	Malaysia	Group E	30,117
30 January 2024	14:30	Uzbekistan	2–1	Thailand	Round of 16	18,691
2 February 2024	18:30	Australia	1–2	South Korea	Quarter-finals	39,632
