= Alexander Michel Melki =

Association football player (born 1992)

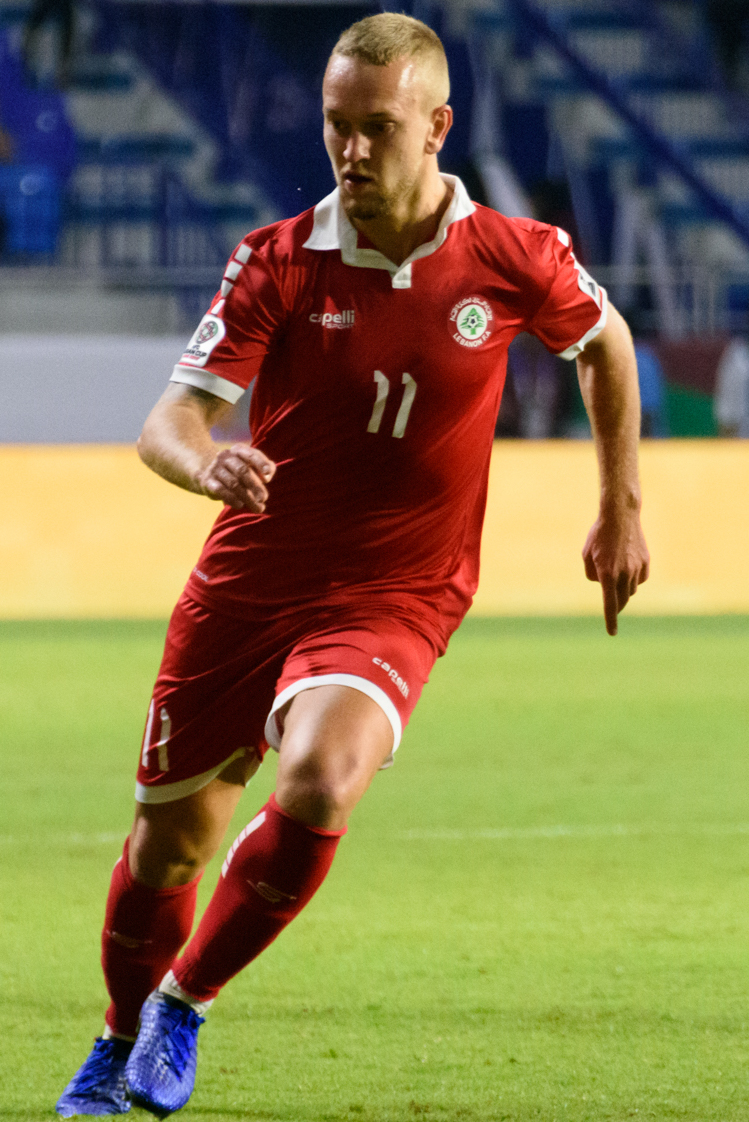
- Michel Melki with Lebanon in 2019

Personal information
- Full name: Robert Alexander Robert Michel Melki
- Date of birth: 14 November 1992 (age 33)
- Place of birth: Västertälje, Södertälje, Sweden
- Height: 1.83 m (6 ft 0 in)
- Positions: Centre-back; right-back

Youth career
- Syrianska FC

Senior career*
Years	Team	Apps	(Gls)
2011–2017	Syrianska FC	99	(3)
2017–2018	AFC Eskilstuna	52	(0)
2019–2021	Al-Khor	34	(0)
2021–2022	Al-Shahania	16	(1)
2022	AFC Eskilstuna	9	(0)
2023	Nordic United	14	(1)
2023–2024	Ansar	19	(2)
2024–2025	Nordic United	9	(1)
Total		252	(8)

International career
2011	Sweden U19	2	(0)
2013	Sweden U21	4	(0)
2018–2024	Lebanon	29	(0)
- * Club domestic league appearances and goals

Robert Alexander Robert Michel Melki (Arabic: روبير الكساندر روبير ميشيل ملكي, Lebanese Arabic pronunciation: [ˈroːbert ʔalekˈsander ˈmelki, -ke]; born 14 November 1992), known as Alexander Michel Melki, (Note: Known as Alexander Michel in Sweden, or Robert Melki (Arabic: روبير ملكي) in Arabic.) is a former professional footballer who played as a defender. Born in Sweden, he played for the Lebanon national team.

After following his father's tracks playing at Syrianska for six years, Michel Melki moved to AFC Eskilstuna in 2017, helping them gain promotion back to the Allsvenskan the following season. In 2019 he moved to Qatar, joining Al-Khor before moving to Al-Shahania in 2021. Michel Melki returned to Sweden, playing for AFC Eskilstuna in 2022 and Nordic United in 2023. He joined Ansar in Lebanon in 2023, before returning to Nordic United for the 2024–25 season, where he retired.

Born in Sweden, Michel Melki represented his native country at under-19 and under-21 levels before switching allegiance to Lebanon in 2018. He took part in the AFC Asian Cup in 2019 and 2023.

== Early life ==
Michel Melki was born in Sweden to a Swedish mother, Carina, and an Assyrian father, Robert, who played for Syrianska, a Swedish club founded by Assyrian immigrants. He has a younger brother, Felix, who also plays football.

In an interview with Aftonbladet, Alexander mentioned that despite their Assyrian roots, the two brothers' connection to Lebanon is through their grandfather, George Michel Melki, who lived there before moving to Sweden in 1967 as one of the first refugees from the Middle East to Sweden. Two of their father's sisters were born in Lebanon.

== Club career ==
=== Syrianska ===
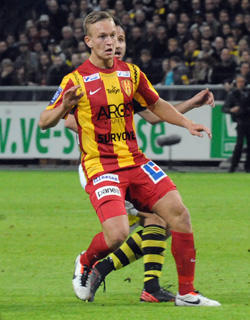
Michel Melki with Syrianska in 2013

Alexander Michel started his career at Syrianska. His personal debut in the first team and in the Allsvenskan took place on 20 June 2011 at the age of 18, with his team being defeated 3–0 against Djurgården. During that season he made a total of 10 league appearances. In 2012 he found further space, with 23 appearances of which 18 as a starter.

Exactly two years after his debut in the Swedish championship, on 20 June 2013 Michel seriously damaged the cruciate ligament of his left knee during a home match against Malmö FF. The injury forced him to stay out of action for a year, with his next official match being played on 25 June 2014 in the Superettan.

Having recovered from the injury, in July 2015 Michel broke the same cruciate ligament damaged two years earlier forcing him to finish the season in advance. His last year at Syrianska was in 2016, with 25 league appearances in the league.

=== AFC Eskilstuna ===
After the expiration of his contract with Syrianska, Michel carried out trials with Hammarby and Djurgården in January 2017. A few weeks later, he signed a two-year contract with Allsveskan side AFC Eskilstuna.

In his first season in the club, Alexander played 23 games in the Allsvenskan coming last in the league. The following season, relegated to the Superettan, he played 29 league games as well as both play-off games to promote his team back to the first division.

=== Al-Khor ===
On 23 January 2019, during the winter transfer window, Alkass Sports Channels officially announced the signing of Michel Melki to Qatar Stars League side Al-Khor until the end of the season. In his first season, in 2018–19, Michel Melki played seven league games, and helped his side avoid relegation by finishing 10th in the league.

During the 2019–20 season, Michel Melki played 20 of the 22 regular season games as a starter, missing two games due to injury, and provided two assists. As Al-Khor finished in 11th place, they played the relegation play-off game against Qatari Second Division side Al-Markhiya. They won the encounter 2–0 after extra time, and avoided relegation once again.

Michel Melki finished runner-up with Al-Khor in the 2020–21 Qatar Stars Cup, featuring in the final against eventual winners Al-Rayyan. After playing seven games during the season, his contract was terminated on 20 February 2021.

=== Al-Shahania ===
Michel Melki joined Qatari Second Division side Al-Shahania, making his debut in the 2020–21 season on 27 February 2021, in a 2–0 win against Muaither. After playing five games in the regular season, helping his side finish in second place, Michel Melki played against his former side Al-Khor in the promotion play-offs, losing 3–1 and remaining in the Second Division. He scored his only goal for Al-Shahania on 26 February 2022, during the 2021–22 season, in a 5–1 league win against Al-Waab.

=== Return to Sweden ===
On 8 August 2022, Michel Melki returned to his former club in Sweden AFC Eskilstuna, reuniting with his brother Felix; he signed a contract until the end of the 2022 Superettan season. On 23 February 2023, he moved to Nordic United in the Ettan Fotboll, the third tier of Swedish football.

=== Ansar ===
On 6 July 2023, Lebanese Premier League club Ansar announced the signing of Michel Melki ahead of the 2023–24 season.

=== Return to Nordic United ===
In August 2024, Michel Melki returned to Ettan club Nordic United. He announced his retirement from football on 17 February 2026.

== International career ==
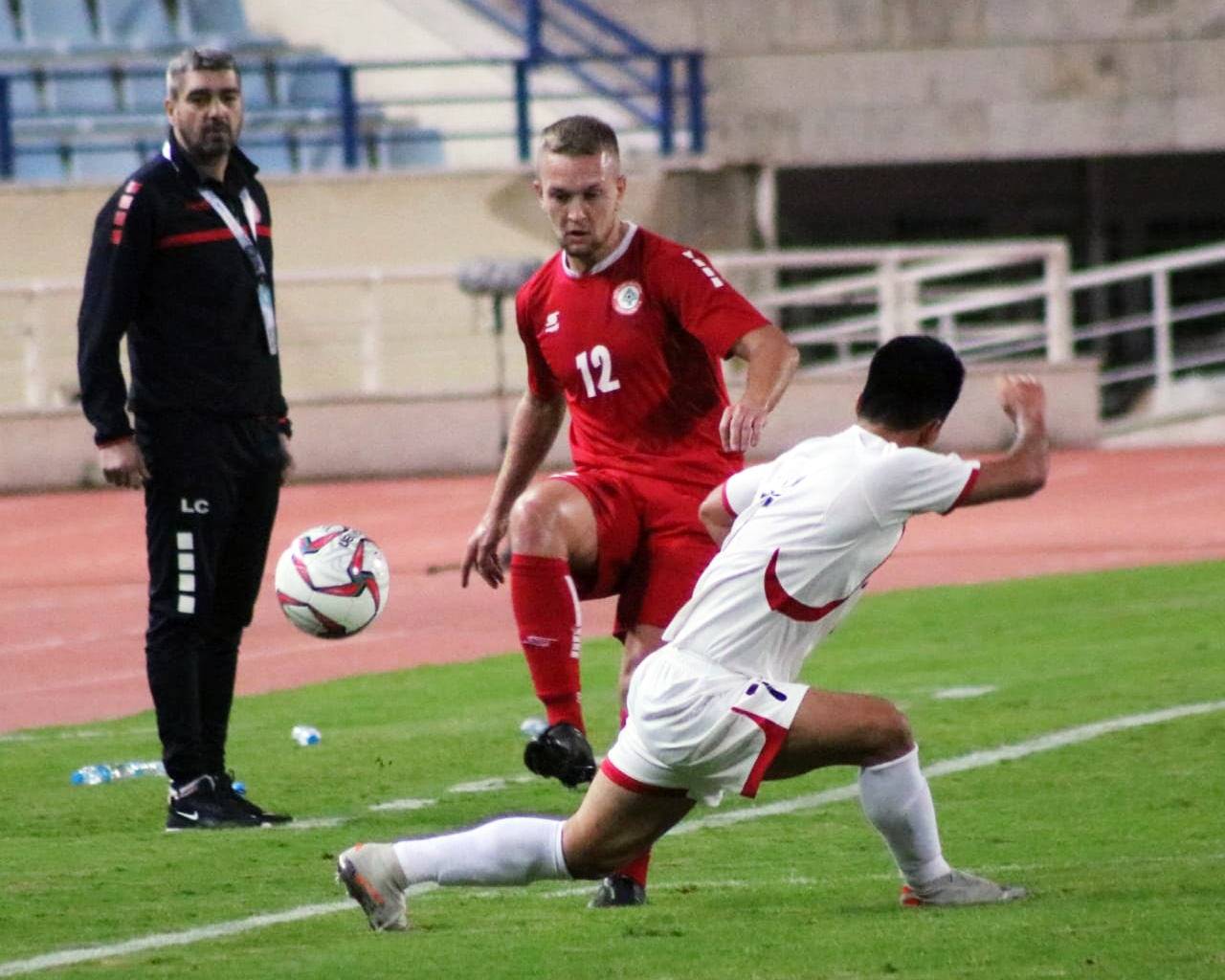
Michel Melki with Lebanon against North Korea in 2019

Michel Melki represented Sweden internationally at under-19 and under-21 level.

In 2018, Michel Melki acquired a Lebanese passport due to his origins, making him eligible for the Lebanon national team. He made his international debut for Lebanon on 15 November 2018, playing the whole 90 minutes in a goalless draw against Uzbekistan. Michel Melki was called up for the 2019 AFC Asian Cup, alongside his brother Alexander, one month later.

On his 27th birthday, on 14 November 2019, Michel Melki played the whole 90 minutes in a 2022 FIFA World Cup qualifier match against South Korea. Lebanon held on to a 0–0 draw, with Michel Melki neutralizing Tottenham Hotspur forward Son Heung-min; he was widely regarded as the Man of the Match by Lebanese fans.

In December 2023, Michel Melki was included in the Lebanese squad for the 2023 AFC Asian Cup.

== Style of play ==
A centre-back at the club level, Michel Melki was mainly deployed as a right-back at the international level.

== Career statistics ==
=== Club ===
Appearances and goals by club, season and competition
Club	Season	League			National cup (Note: Includes Svenska Cupen, Emir of Qatar Cup)		League cup (Note: Includes Qatari Stars Cup)		Other		Total	
Club	Season	Division	Apps	Goals	Apps	Goals	Apps	Goals	Apps	Goals	Apps	Goals
Syrianska	2011	Allsvenskan	10	0	—		—		—		10	0
Syrianska	2012	Allsvenskan	23	1	3	0	—		—		26	1
Syrianska	2013	Allsvenskan	12	2	—		—		—		12	2
Syrianska	2014	Superettan	15	0	3	0	—		—		18	0
Syrianska	2015	Superettan	14	0	—		—		—		14	0
Syrianska	2016	Superettan	25	0	0	0	—		2 (Note: Appearances in Superettan relegation play-outs)	0	27	0
Syrianska	Total		99	3	6	0	0	0	2	0	107	3
AFC Eskilstuna	2017	Allsvenskan	23	0	—		—		—		23	0
AFC Eskilstuna	2018	Superettan	29	0	1	1	—		2 (Note: Appearances in Allsvenskan promotion play-offs)	0	32	1
AFC Eskilstuna	Total		52	0	1	1	0	0	2	0	55	1
Al-Khor	2018–19	Qatar Stars League	7	0	—		—		—		7	0
Al-Khor	2019–20	Qatar Stars League	20	0	—		2	0	1 (Note: Appearance in Qatar Stars League relegation play-outs)	0	23	0
Al-Khor	2020–21	Qatar Stars League	7	0	—		3	0	—		10	0
Al-Khor	Total		34	0	0	0	5	0	1	0	40	0
Al-Shahania	2020–21	Qatari Second Division	5	0	—		—		3 (Note: Two appearances in Qatar FA Cup, one appearance in Qatari Second Division promotion play-offs)	0	8	0
Al-Shahania	2021–22	Qatari Second Division	11	1	1	0	—		4 (Note: Three appearances in Qatar FA Cup, one appearance in Qatari Second Division Cup)	0	16	1
Al-Shahania	Total		16	1	1	0	0	0	7	0	24	1
AFC Eskilstuna	2022	Superettan	9	0	0	0	—		—		9	0
Nordic United	2023	Ettan	14	1	—		—		—		14	1
Ansar	2023–24	Lebanese Premier League	19	2	2	0	—		—		21	2
Nordic United	2024	Ettan	9	1	—		—		—		9	1
Nordic United	2025	Ettan	0	0	—		—		—		0	0
Nordic United	Total		9	1	0	0	0	0	0	0	9	1
Career total			252	8	10	1	5	0	12	0	279	9

=== International ===
As of match played 22 January 2024

Appearances and goals by national team and year
National team	Year	Apps	Goals
Lebanon	2018	2	0
Lebanon	2019	8	0
Lebanon	2020	1	0
Lebanon	2021	11	0
Lebanon	2022	2	0
Lebanon	2023	1	0
Lebanon	2024	4	0
Total		29	0

== Honours ==
Al-Khor

- Qatari Stars Cup runner-up: 2020–21

Ansar

- Lebanese FA Cup: 2023–24

== See also ==
- List of Lebanon international footballers born outside Lebanon
- List of sportspeople who competed for more than one nation
- List of association football families
