= Salah Adel =

Sudanese footballer

Personal information
- Full name: Salaheldin Adel Ahmed Alhassan
- Date of birth: 3 April 1995 (age 31)
- Place of birth: Sudan
- Height: 1.70 m (5 ft 7 in)
- Position: Midfielder

Team information
- Current team: Al-Hilal SC
- Number: 15

Senior career*
Years	Team	Apps	(Gls)
2014-2016	Al-Mahdia SC (Omdurman)		
2017-2020	Al-Ahly Shendi		
2020-	Al-Hilal SC		

International career^{‡}
2018–	Sudan	43	(1)
- * Club domestic league appearances and goals as of 11 October 2021 ‡ National team caps and goals as of 16 November 2026

Salaheldin Adel Ahmed Alhassan (born 3 April 1995) is a Sudanese professional footballer who plays as a midfielder for Al-Hilal SC and the Sudan national football team.
