= Ahmed Bibo =

Sudanese footballer

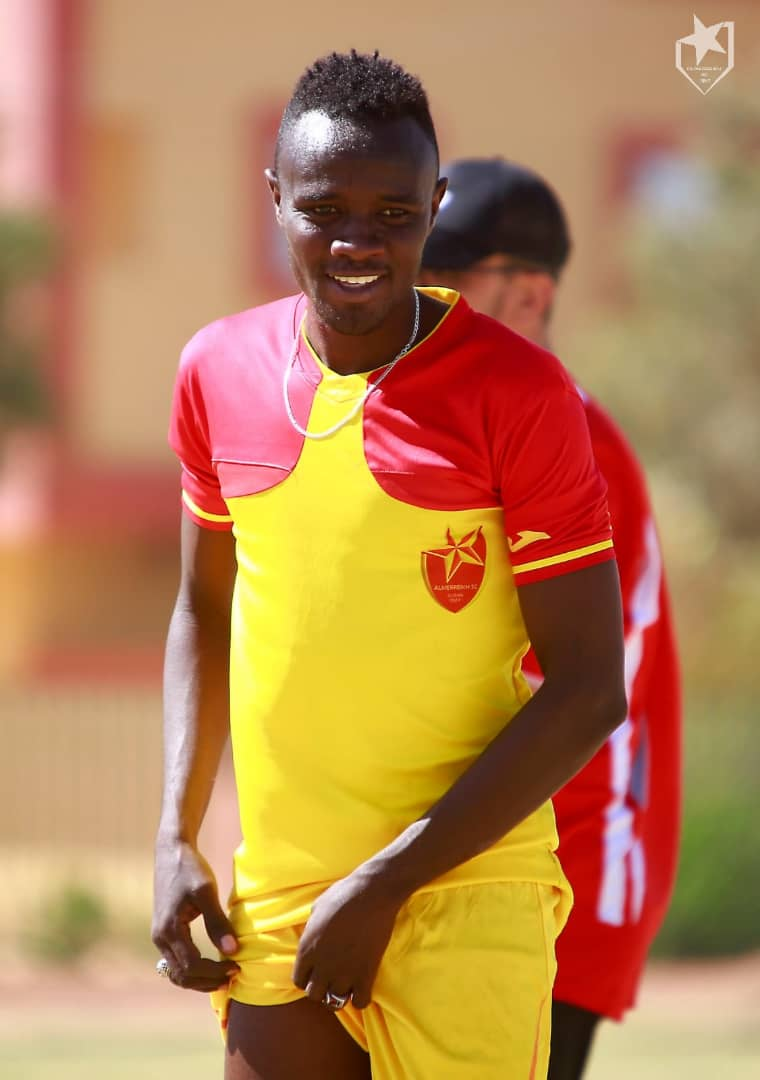

Personal information
- Full name: Ahmed Adam Ahmed Muhamed
- Date of birth: 1 September 1994 (age 32)
- Place of birth: Wau, Sudan
- Height: 1.62 m (5 ft 4 in)
- Position: Left back

Team information
- Current team: Al-Merrikh SC (Al-Obeid)
- Number: 23

Senior career*
Years	Team	Apps	(Gls)
2014-2017	Khartoum NC		
2017-2024	Al-Merrikh SC		
2025	Al Dhahra SC		
2026-	Al-Hilal ESC (Al-Fasher)		

International career^{‡}
2017–2023	Sudan	15	(0)
Medal record
Men's football
Representing Sudan
African Nations Championship
Third place	2018 Morocco
- * Club domestic league appearances and goals as of 5 September 2026 ‡ National team caps and goals as of 19 January 2023

Ahmed Adam Ahmed Muhamed (born 1 September 1994), commonly known as Ahmed Bibo is a Sudanese professional footballer who plays as a defender for Al-Merrikh SC and the Sudan national football team.

== Honours ==
Sudan

- African Nations Championship: 3rd place, 2018
