= Mouhammed-Ali Dhaini =

Association football player (born 1994)

- Dhaini in 2021

Personal information
- Full name: Mouhammed-Ali Najib Dhaini
- Date of birth: 1 March 1994 (age 32)
- Place of birth: Strömstad, Sweden
- Height: 1.86 m (6 ft 1 in)
- Positions: Defensive midfielder; centre-back

Team information
- Current team: Ahed

Senior career*
Years	Team	Apps	(Gls)
2013–2016	BK Olympic	75	(3)
2017–2019	Torns IF	84	(1)
2020–2023	Trelleborgs FF	87	(10)
2023–2026	Ansar	39	(0)
2026–	Ahed	0	(0)

International career^{‡}
2020–2024	Lebanon	26	(0)
- * Club domestic league appearances and goals as of 30 December 2025 ‡ National team caps and goals as of 4 January 2023

Mouhammed-Ali Najib Dhaini (Arabic: محمد علي نجيب دهيني; born 1 March 1994) is a footballer who plays as a defensive midfielder or centre-back for Lebanese Premier League club Ahed. Born in Sweden, he has played for the Lebanon national team.

Having begun his senior career in Sweden at Division 3 side BK Olympic in 2013, Dhaini joined Torns IF in the Division 2 in 2017, helping them gain promotion to the Division 1 in his first season. In 2020, he joined Superettan club Trelleborgs FF. Dhaini moved to Lebanon in 2023, joining Ansar.

== Club career ==
=== Torns IF ===
Having previously played for BK Olympic, Dhaini joined Swedish Division 2 side Torns IF on 2 January 2017. He played 27 games, 25 in the league and two in the Svenska Cupen, helping his side gain promotion to the Division 1. Dhaini was nominated 2017 Torns IF Player of the Year for his performances.

In the Division 1, Dhaini played a total of 59 games (29 in 2018 and 30 in 2019), scoring once in 2018 against Utsiktens BK. Dhaini played 90 games in total for Torns IF.

=== Trelleborgs FF ===
Following a trial in December 2019, Dhaini moved to Superettan side Trelleborgs FF on a one-year contract on 17 February 2020. Following a knee operation, Dhaini made his debut on 13 July against GAIS. He played 21 league games, making three assists, and helped his side remain in the Superettan after beating IF Brommapojkarna on penalty shoot-outs in the relegation playoffs.

Trelleborg extended Dhaini's contract for two years on 14 January 2021. Dhaini scored his first goal for Trelleborg on 10 May, helping his team draw 1–1 in the 2021 Superettan against Akropolis. On 26 October, Dhaini scored a brace in a 4–0 league win against AFC Eskilstuna. During the 2022 season, he helped Trelleborg come back from 2–0 down to win 4–2 against Dalkurd on 21 August, scoring the temporary 1–2 goal.

=== Lebanon ===
On 29 December 2023, Dhaini joined Lebanese Premier League side Ansar ahead of the second leg of the 2023–24 season. He left Ansar on 1 September 2026.

On 28 September 2026, Dhaini signed for Ahed.

== International career ==
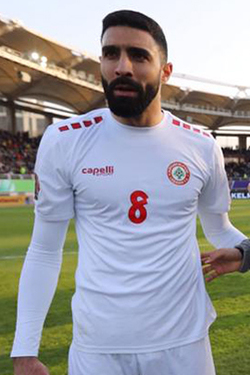
Dhaini with the Lebanon national team against Iran in 2022

Dhaini made his debut for the Lebanon national team in a friendly against Bahrain on 12 November 2020. In December 2023, Dhaini was included in the Lebanese squad for the 2023 AFC Asian Cup.

== Style of play ==
A defensive midfielder, Dhaini has been noted for his passing and ball retention. Salif Camara Jönsson, team manager at Trelleborgs FF, described Dhaini's dual game and fighting spirit as his main strengths.

== Personal life ==
Dhaini has an older sister, a younger brother, and a younger sister. While playing for BK Olympic, Dhaini worked at a bakery.

== Career statistics ==
=== Club ===
As of match played 30 December 2025

Appearances and goals by club, season and competition
Club	Season	League			National cup (Note: Includes Svenska Cupen, Lebanese FA Cup)		Continental		Other		Total	
Club	Season	Division	Apps	Goals	Apps	Goals	Apps	Goals	Apps	Goals	Apps	Goals
BK Olympic	2013	Division 3	15	1	—		—		—		15	1
BK Olympic	2014	Division 3	20	0	1	0	—		—		21	0
BK Olympic	2015	Division 3	17	0	—		—		—		17	0
BK Olympic	2016	Division 2	23	2	—		—		—		23	2
BK Olympic	Total		75	3	1	0	0	0	0	0	76	3
Torns IF	2017	Division 2	25	0	2	0	—		—		27	0
Torns IF	2018	Division 1	29	1	2	0	—		—		31	1
Torns IF	2019	Division 1	30	0	2	0	—		—		32	0
Torns IF	Total		84	1	6	0	0	0	0	0	90	1
Trelleborgs FF	2020	Superettan	21	0	5	0	—		1 (Note: Appearance in Superettan relegation play-offs)	0	27	0
Trelleborgs FF	2021	Superettan	23	4	2	0	—		—		25	4
Trelleborgs FF	2022	Superettan	27	3	4	2	—		—		31	5
Trelleborgs FF	2023	Superettan	16	3	0	0	—		—		16	3
Trelleborgs FF	Total		87	10	11	2	0	0	1	0	99	12
Ansar	2023–24	Lebanese Premier League	12	0	3	0	—		—		15	0
Ansar	2024–25	Lebanese Premier League	17	0	—		—		—		17	0
Ansar	2025–26	Lebanese Premier League	10	0	1	0	1 (Note: Appearance in AFC Challenge League)	0	—		12	0
Ansar	Total		39	0	4	0	1	0	0	0	44	0
Career total			285	14	22	2	1	0	1	0	309	16

=== International ===
As of match played 4 January 2023

Appearances and goals by national team and year
National team	Year	Apps	Goals
Lebanon	2020	1	0
Lebanon	2021	11	0
Lebanon	2022	6	0
Lebanon	2023	7	0
Lebanon	2024	1	0
Total		26	0

== Honours ==
Ansar

- Lebanese Premier League: 2024–25, 2025–26
- Lebanese FA Cup: 2023–24

Individual

- BK Olympic Player of the Year: 2016
- Torns IF Player of the Year: 2017

== See also ==
- List of Lebanon international footballers born outside Lebanon
