= Abuaagla Abdalla =

Sudanese footballer

Abuaagla Abdallah
Personal information
- Full name: Abuaagla Abdallah Muhamed Ahmed
- Date of birth: 11 March 1993 (age 33)
- Place of birth: Sudan
- Height: 1.78 m (5 ft 10 in)
- Position: Midfielder

Team information
- Current team: Al-Hilal SC (Benghazi)
- Number: 2

Senior career*
Years	Team	Apps	(Gls)
2008–2012	Al-Tilal SC (Rashad)		
2013	Al-Zihour SC (Omdurman)		
2014–2015	Ombada SC		
2016–2024	Al-Hilal SC		
2024-2025	Al-Ahly SC (Benghazi)		
2025-	Al-Hilal SC (Benghazi)		

International career^{‡}
2015	Sudan U23	7	(1)
2015–	Sudan	69	(2)
Medal record
Men's football
Representing Sudan
African Nations Championship
Third place	2018 Morocco
- * Club domestic league appearances and goals as of 19 November 2024 ‡ National team caps and goals as of 16 November 2026

Abuaagla Abdallah Muhamed Ahmed (born 11 March 1993) is a Sudanese professional footballer who plays as a midfielder for Sudan Premier League club Al-Hilal SC and the Sudan national team.

He debuted internationally on 11 November 2015, at the 2018 FIFA World Cup qualifying match against Zambia in a 0-1 defeat.

On 18 November 2018, Ahmed scored his first goal for Sudan against Madagascar at the 2019 Africa Cup of Nations qualifying match in a 1-3 victory.

== Honours ==
Sudan

- African Nations Championship: 3rd place, 2018
