= Hussein Faisal =

Egyptian footballer (born 1999)

Personal information
- Full name: Hussein Faisal Hussein Abdelkader
- Date of birth: 4 March 1999 (age 27)
- Place of birth: Egypt
- Height: 1.84 m (6 ft 0 in)
- Position: Attacking midfielder

Team information
- Current team: Al-Masry SC
- Number: 18

Youth career
- Zamalek

Senior career*
Years	Team	Apps	(Gls)
2019–2020	Tanta	9	(0)
2020–2021	Zamalek	6	(0)
2021–2023	Smouha	66	(5)
2023-	Al-Masry SC	30	(0)
- * Club domestic league appearances and goals as of 10 December 2025 @ 17:26(AEST)

Hussein Faisal Hussein Abdelkader (Arabic: حسين فيصل حسين عبد القادر; born 4 March 1999) is an Egyptian professional footballer who plays as an attacking midfielder for Egyptian Premier League club Smouha.

== Career statistics ==
=== Club ===
As of 14:25, 29 December 2020 (UTC)

Club	Season	League			Cup		Continental		Other		Total	
Club	Season	Division	Apps	Goals	Apps	Goals	Apps	Goals	Apps	Goals	Apps	Goals
Tanta	2019–20	Egyptian Premier League	6	0	0	0	0	0	0	0	1	0
Career total				0	0	0	0	0	0	0	6	0

=== International ===
No.	Date	Venue	Opponent	Score	Result	Competition
1.	4 December 2021	Stadium 974, Doha, Qatar	Sudan	4–0	5–0	2021 FIFA Arab Cup
