= Ahmed Yassin (footballer) =

Egyptian footballer (born 1997)

Personal information
- Full name: Ahmed Ibrahim Yassin Mahmoud
- Date of birth: 1 January 1997 (age 29)
- Place of birth: Egypt
- Height: 1.80 m (5 ft 11 in)
- Position: Centre-back

Team information
- Current team: Bank of Egypt
- Number: 29

Youth career
- Misr Lel Makkasa

Senior career*
Years	Team	Apps	(Gls)
2019–2021	Misr Lel Makkasa	16	(0)
2020–2021	→Bank of Egypt (loan)	20	(0)
2021–	Bank of Egypt	7	(0)

International career^{‡}
2021–	Egypt	3	(0)
- * Club domestic league appearances and goals as of 18:44, 28 December 2021 (UTC) ‡ National team caps and goals as of 18:44, 28 December 2021 (UTC)

Ahmed Ibrahim Yassin Mahmoud (Arabic: أَحمَد إبرَاهِيْم يَاسِيْن مَحمُود; born 1 January 1997) is an Egyptian professional footballer who plays as a centre-back for Egyptian Premier League club Bank of Egypt and the Egypt national team.

== Professional career ==
Yassin began his professional career with Misr Lel Makkasa a 1–0 Egyptian Premier League loss to El Gouna on 6 October 2019. He joined Al Ahly on loan for the 2020–21 season, and after a strong debut season joined the club permanently in the summer of 2021.

== International career ==
Yassin debuted with the Egypt national team in a 2–1 2022 FIFA World Cup qualification win over Gabon on 16 November 2021. He was called up to represent Egypt at the 2021 FIFA Arab Cup.
