= Ali Daher =

Lebanese footballer (born 1996)

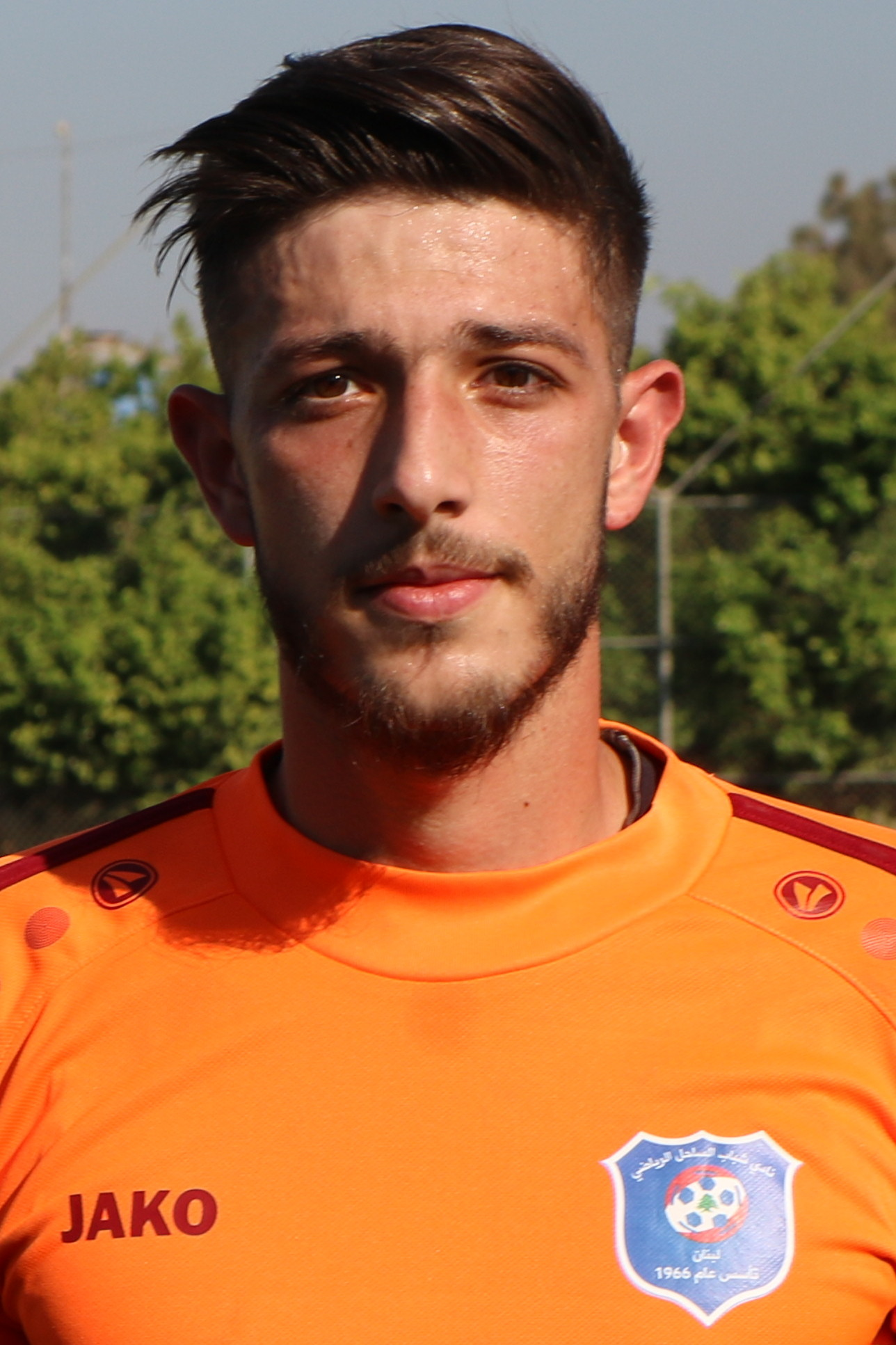
- Daher with Shabab Sahel in 2020

Personal information
- Full name: Ali Talal Daher
- Date of birth: 26 November 1996 (age 29)
- Place of birth: Khiam, Lebanon
- Height: 1.90 m (6 ft 3 in)
- Position: Goalkeeper

Youth career
- Ahed

Senior career*
Years	Team	Apps	(Gls)
2016–2025	Ahed	1	(0)
2018–2020	→ Shabab Sahel (loan)	12	(0)
2020–2023	→ Shabab Sahel (loan)	44	(0)
2023–2024	Ahli Nabatieh	19	(0)

International career^{‡}
2019–2020	Lebanon	2	(0)
- * Club domestic league appearances and goals as of 28 April 2024 ‡ National team caps and goals as of 16:28, 12 November 2020 (UTC)

Ali Talal Daher (Arabic: عَلِيّ طَلَال ضَاهِر, Lebanese Arabic pronunciation: [ˈʕali ˈdˤɑːher]; born 26 November 1996) is a Lebanese footballer who plays as a goalkeeper.

== Club career ==
Starting his career at Ahed, Daher was sent on a two-year loan to Shabab Sahel in 2018. He played 18 matches for the club in all competitions, nine in the league, keeping eight clean sheets. Daher was recalled from loan on 25 January 2020 to participate in the 2020 AFC Cup. In July 2020, Daher's loan to Shabab Sahel was renewed for the 2020–21 and 2021–22 seasons; in July 2022, the loan was further renewed for the 2022–23 season.

On 24 June 2023, Daher signed for Ahli Nabatieh on a free transfer.

== International career ==
Daher made his international debut for Lebanon on 10 September 2019, in a friendly game against Oman.

== Career statistics ==
=== International ===
As of match played 12 November 2020

Appearances and goals by national team and year
National team	Year	Apps	Goals
Lebanon	2019	1	0
Lebanon	2020	1	0
Total		2	0

== Honours ==
Ahed

- Lebanese Premier League: 2016–17

Shabab Sahel

- Lebanese Elite Cup: 2019

Ahli Nabatieh

- Lebanese Federation Cup runner-up: 2023
