= 2021 Africa Cup of Nations Group F =

Football tournament group stage

Group F of the 2021 Africa Cup of Nations took place from 12 to 20 January 2022. The group consisted of debutants the Gambia, as well as Mali, Mauritania and Tunisia.

Mali and Gambia as the top two teams, along with Tunisia as one of the four best third-placed teams, advanced to the round of 16.

== Teams ==
Draw position	Team	Zone	Method of qualification	Date of qualification	Finals appearance	Last appearance	Previous best performance	FIFA Rankings	
Draw position	Team	Zone	Method of qualification	Date of qualification	Finals appearance	Last appearance	Previous best performance	May 2021 (Note: The rankings of May 2021 were used for seeding for the final draw.)	December 2021
F1	Tunisia	UNAF	Group J winners	17 November 2020	20th	2019	Winners (2004)	26	30
F2	Mali	WAFU	Group A winners	17 November 2020	12th	2019	Runners-up (1972)	57	53
F3	Gambia	WAFU	Group D winners	25 March 2021	1st	None	Debut	152	150
F4	Mauritania	WAFU	Group E runners-up	30 March 2021	2nd	2019	Group stage (2019)	101	103

== Standings ==
Pos	Team	Pld	W	D	L	GF	GA	GD	Pts	Qualification
1	Mali	3	2	1	0	4	1	+3	7	Advance to knockout stage
2	Gambia	3	2	1	0	3	1	+2	7	Advance to knockout stage
3	Tunisia	3	1	0	2	4	2	+2	3	Advance to knockout stage
4	Mauritania	3	0	0	3	0	7	−7	0	

Source: CAF
Rules for classification: Group stage tiebreakers

== Matches ==
=== Tunisia vs Mali ===
12 January 2022
14:00

Tunisia	0–1	Mali
	Report	Koné 48' (pen.)

Limbe Stadium, Limbe
Referee: Janny Sikazwe (Zambia)

Tunisia	Mali

GK	22	Bechir Ben Saïd
CB	6	Dylan Bronn
CB	3	Montassar Talbi
CB	2	Bilel Ifa		(substituted off) 81'
RM	21	Hamza Mathlouthi	(yellow card) 22'
CM	28	Aïssa Laïdouni		(substituted off) 67'
CM	17	Ellyes Skhiri	(yellow card) 47'
LM	12	Ali Maâloul
RF	14	Hannibal Mejbri		(substituted off) 46'
CF	10	Wahbi Khazri (c)
LF	23	Naïm Sliti		(substituted off) 79'
Substitutions:
MF	8	Saîf-Eddine Khaoui		(substituted on) 46'
MF	25	Anis Ben Slimane		(substituted on) 67'
FW	9	Yoann Touzghar		(substituted on) 79'
FW	11	Seifeddine Jaziri		(substituted on) 81'
Manager:
Mondher Kebaier

GK	1	Ibrahim Mounkoro
RB	2	Hamari Traoré (c)	(yellow card) 18'
CB	17	Falaye Sacko
CB	5	Boubakar Kouyaté
LB	6	Massadio Haïdara
CM	8	Diadie Samassékou
CM	4	Amadou Haidara		(substituted off) 81'
RW	14	Adama Malouda Traoré		(substituted off) 73'
AM	21	Adama Noss Traoré		(substituted off) 59'
LW	19	Moussa Djenepo	(yellow card) 33'	(substituted off) 81'
CF	18	Ibrahima Koné		(substituted off) 73'
Substitutions:
MF	20	Yves Bissouma		(substituted on) 59'
FW	10	Kalifa Coulibaly		(substituted on) 73'
FW	7	Moussa Doumbia		(substituted on) 73'
MF	11	Lassana Coulibaly		(substituted on) 81'
FW	9	El Bilal Touré	(red card) 87'	(substituted on) 81'
Manager:
Mohamed Magassouba

Man of the Match:
Ibrahim Mounkoro (Mali)

Assistant referees:
Jerson Emiliano dos Santos (Angola)
Issa Yaya (Chad)
Fourth official:
Hélder Martins de Carvalho (Angola)
Video assistant referee:
Fernando Guerrero (Mexico)
Assistant video assistant referee:
Mokrane Gourari (Algeria)

=== Mauritania vs Gambia ===
12 January 2022
17:45 (Note: The Mauritania v Gambia match was originally scheduled to kick-off at 17:00, but was delayed to 17:45 due to timing issues in the Tunisia v Mali match.)

Mauritania	0–1	Gambia
	Report	A. Jallow 10'

Limbe Stadium, Limbe
Referee: Mustapha Ghorbal (Algeria)

Mauritania	Gambia

GK	22	Babacar Diop
CB	21	El Hassen Houeibib		(substituted off) 80'
CB	14	Mohamed Dellahi Yali
CB	3	Aly Abeid
RWB	2	Souleymane Karamoko		(substituted off) 46'
LWB	28	Abdoulkader Thiam		(substituted off) 66'
CM	12	Almike N'Diaye	(yellow card) 30'	(substituted off) 65'
CM	8	Guessouma Fofana
CM	17	Abdallahi Mahmoud		(substituted off) 59'
CF	27	Aboubakar Kamara (c)
CF	25	Pape Ibnou Ba	(yellow card) 28'
Substitutions:
DF	4	Harouna Abou Demba		(substituted on) 46'
FW	15	Souleymane Doukara		(substituted on) 59'
FW	7	Idrissa Thiam		(substituted on) 65'
FW	11	Oumar Camara		(substituted on) 66'
FW	10	Adama Ba		(substituted on) 80'
Manager:
(France) Didier Gomes Da Rosa

GK	1	Modou Jobe
CB	6	Sulayman Marreh
CB	5	Omar Colley
CB	26	Ibou Touray
RWB	12	James Gomez		(substituted off) 82'
LWB	13	Pa Modou Jagne (c)
CM	3	Ablie Jallow		(substituted off) 64'
CM	28	Ebou Adams
CM	19	Ebrima Colley	(yellow card) 56'	(substituted off) 74'
SS	10	Musa Barrow
CF	9	Assan Ceesay		(substituted off) 64'
Substitutions:
FW	24	Dembo Darboe	(yellow card) 90+1'	(substituted on) 64'
MF	8	Ebrima Darboe		(substituted on) 64'
FW	7	Lamin Jallow	(yellow card) 90+1'	(substituted on) 74'
DF	25	Bubacarr Sanneh		(substituted on) 82'
Manager:
(Belgium) Tom Saintfiet

Man of the Match:
Musa Barrow (Gambia)

Assistant referees:
James Fredrick Emile (Seychelles)
Carine Atezambong Fomo (Cameroon)
Fourth official:
Blaise Yuven Ngwa (Cameroon)
Video assistant referee:
Mustapha Ghorbal (Algeria)
Assistant video assistant referee:
Abdelhak Etchiali (Algeria)

=== Gambia vs Mali ===
16 January 2022
14:00

Gambia	1–1	Mali
Mu. Barrow 90' (pen.)	Report	Koné 79' (pen.)

Limbe Stadium, Limbe
Referee: Samir Guezzaz (Morocco)

Gambia	Mali

GK	1	Modou Jobe
RB	14	Noah Sonko Sundberg		(substituted off) 73'
CB	12	James Gomez
CB	5	Omar Colley (c)
LB	26	Ibou Touray
DM	6	Sulayman Marreh	(yellow card) 24'
CM	28	Ebou Adams		(substituted off) 83'
CM	2	Yusupha Bobb
RW	3	Ablie Jallow		(substituted off) 83'
LW	10	Musa Barrow
CF	9	Assan Ceesay		(substituted off) 73'
Substitutions:
DF	21	Saidy Janko		(substituted on) 73'
FW	19	Ebrima Colley		(substituted on) 73'
FW	11	Modou Barrow		(substituted on) 83'
FW	23	Muhammed Badamosi	(yellow card) 90+4'	(substituted on) 83'
Manager:
(Belgium) Tom Saintfiet

GK	1	Ibrahim Mounkoro
RB	2	Hamari Traoré (c)
CB	17	Falaye Sacko
CB	5	Boubakar Kouyaté
LB	6	Massadio Haïdara	(yellow card) 43'
CM	11	Lassana Coulibaly	(yellow card) 20'	(substituted off) 46'
CM	8	Diadie Samassékou		(substituted off) 46'
CM	20	Yves Bissouma
RF	14	Adama Malouda Traoré
CF	18	Ibrahima Koné
LF	19	Moussa Djenepo	(yellow card) 40'	(substituted off) 70'
Substitutions:
MF	21	Adama Noss Traoré		(substituted on) 46'
MF	4	Amadou Haidara		(substituted on) 46'
FW	7	Moussa Doumbia		(substituted on) 70'
Manager:
Mohamed Magassouba

Man of the Match:
Yves Bissouma (Mali)

Assistant referees:
Zakaria Brinsi (Morocco)
Fatiha Jermoumi (Morocco)
Fourth official:
Jean-Jacques Ndala (DR Congo)
Video assistant referee:
Rédouane Jiyed (Morocco)
Assistant video assistant referee:
Bouchra Karboubi (Morocco)

=== Tunisia vs Mauritania ===
16 January 2022
17:00

Tunisia	4–0	Mauritania
Mathlouthi 4'; Khazri 9', 64'; Jaziri 66'	Report

Limbe Stadium, Limbe
Referee: Mahmoud El Banna (Egypt)

Tunisia	Mauritania

GK	22	Bechir Ben Saïd
RB	21	Hamza Mathlouthi
CB	2	Bilel Ifa	(yellow card) 37'	(substituted off) 81'
CB	3	Montassar Talbi
LB	12	Ali Maâloul
CM	25	Anis Ben Slimane	(yellow card) 45+1'	(substituted off) 71'
CM	17	Ellyes Skhiri
CM	18	Ghailene Chaalali
RF	8	Saîf-Eddine Khaoui		(substituted off) 60'
CF	11	Seifeddine Jaziri		(substituted off) 71'
LF	10	Wahbi Khazri (c)	(yellow card) 15'	(substituted off) 80'
Substitutions:
MF	15	Mohamed Ali Ben Romdhane		(substituted on) 60'
MF	28	Aïssa Laïdouni		(substituted on) 71'
MF	19	Hamza Rafia		(substituted on) 71'
FW	7	Youssef Msakni		(substituted on) 80'
DF	4	Omar Rekik		(substituted on) 81'
Manager:
Mondher Kebaier

GK	22	Babacar Diop
CB	21	El Hassen Houeibib
CB	14	Mohamed Dellahi Yali
CB	3	Aly Abeid		(substituted off) 14'
RWB	4	Harouna Abou Demba
LWB	28	Abdoulkader Thiam
RM	7	Idrissa Thiam		(substituted off) 68'
CM	12	Almike N'Diaye		(substituted off) 60'
CM	8	Guessouma Fofana
LM	11	Oumar Camara		(substituted off) 60'
CF	27	Aboubakar Kamara (c)	(yellow card) 37'	(substituted off) 46'
Substitutions:
MF	23	Mouhamed Soueid		(substituted on) 14'
FW	25	Pape Ibnou Ba		(substituted on) 46'
FW	9	Hemeya Tanjy		(substituted on) 60'
MF	24	Yacoub Sidi Ethmane		(substituted on) 60'
DF	2	Souleymane Karamoko		(substituted on) 68'
Manager:
(France) Didier Gomes Da Rosa

Man of the Match:
Wahbi Khazri (Tunisia)

Assistant referees:
Mahmoud Ahmed Abouelregal (Egypt)
Ahmed Hossam Taha (Egypt)
Fourth official:
Mohamed Marouf Eid Mansour (Egypt)
Video assistant referee:
Mahmoud Mohamed Ashour (Egypt)
Assistant video assistant referee:
Ahmed El Ghandour (Egypt)

=== Gambia vs Tunisia ===
20 January 2022
20:00

Gambia	1–0	Tunisia
A. Jallow 90+3'	Report

Limbe Stadium, Limbe
Referee: Fernando Guerrero (Mexico)

Gambia	Tunisia

GK	18	Baboucarr Gaye
RB	12	James Gomez	(yellow card) 89'
CB	16	Mohammed Mbye		(substituted off) 46'
CB	5	Omar Colley
LB	13	Pa Modou Jagne (c)
RM	14	Noah Sonko Sundberg		(substituted off) 61'
CM	15	Ebrima Sohna		(substituted off) 46'
CM	2	Yusupha Bobb
LM	11	Modou Barrow		(substituted off) 85'
CF	21	Saidy Janko		(substituted off) 62'
CF	10	Musa Barrow
Substitutions:
FW	3	Ablie Jallow		(substituted on) 46'
MF	28	Ebou Adams	(yellow card) 48'	(substituted on) 46'
DF	26	Ibou Touray		(substituted on) 61'
FW	23	Muhammed Badamosi		(substituted on) 62'
FW	17	Bubacarr Jobe		(substituted on) 85'
Manager:
(Belgium) Tom Saintfiet

GK	22	Bechir Ben Saïd
RB	21	Hamza Mathlouthi	(yellow card) 45+2'	(substituted off) 57'
CB	2	Bilel Ifa
CB	3	Montassar Talbi
LB	13	Ali Abdi
CM	25	Anis Ben Slimane
CM	17	Ellyes Skhiri (c)
CM	28	Aïssa Laïdouni
RF	8	Saîf-Eddine Khaoui		(substituted off) 57'
CF	11	Seifeddine Jaziri
LF	19	Hamza Rafia		(substituted off) 68'
Substitutions:
FW	7	Youssef Msakni		(substituted on) 57'
DF	20	Mohamed Dräger	(yellow card) 90+2'	(substituted on) 57'
MF	14	Hannibal Mejbri	(yellow card) 90+2'	(substituted on) 68'
Other disciplinary actions:
GK	1	Farouk Ben Mustapha	(red card) 45+3'
Manager:
Mondher Kebaier

Man of the Match:
Baboucarr Gaye (Gambia)

Assistant referees:
Soulaimane Amaldine (Comoros)
Liban Abdourazak Ahmed (Djibouti)
Fourth official:
Mario Escobar (Guatemala)
Video assistant referee:
Lahlou Benbraham (Algeria)
Assistant video assistant referee:
Fatiha Jermoumi (Morocco)

=== Mali vs Mauritania ===
20 January 2022
20:00

Mali	2–0	Mauritania
Haïdara 2'; Koné 49' (pen.)	Report

Japoma Stadium, Douala
Referee: Bernard Camille (Seychelles)

Mali	Mauritania

GK	1	Ibrahim Mounkoro
RB	2	Hamari Traoré (c)		(substituted off) 64'
CB	17	Falaye Sacko
CB	5	Boubakar Kouyaté
LB	6	Massadio Haïdara
CM	4	Amadou Haidara		(substituted off) 82'
CM	20	Yves Bissouma	(yellow card) 60'	(substituted off) 63'
RW	14	Adama Malouda Traoré		(substituted off) 74'
AM	21	Adama Noss Traoré
LW	7	Moussa Doumbia
CF	18	Ibrahima Koné		(substituted off) 75'
Substitutions:
MF	26	Mohamed Camara		(substituted on) 63'
DF	12	Moussa Sissako		(substituted on) 64'
FW	25	Lassine Sinayoko		(substituted on) 74'
FW	10	Kalifa Coulibaly		(substituted on) 75'
MF	23	Aliou Dieng		(substituted on) 82'
Manager:
Mohamed Magassouba

GK	22	Babacar Diop		(substituted off) 81'
RB	4	Harouna Abou Demba		(substituted off) 39'
CB	14	Mohamed Dellahi Yali (c)
CB	3	Aly Abeid	(yellow card) 48'
LB	20	Houssen Abderrahmane
CM	23	Mouhamed Soueid		(substituted off) 62'
CM	8	Guessouma Fofana
CM	18	Bodda Mouhsine
RF	11	Oumar Camara		(substituted off) 62'
CF	25	Pape Ibnou Ba
LF	7	Idrissa Thiam	(yellow card) 78'	(substituted off) 81'
Substitutions:
DF	2	Souleymane Karamoko		(substituted on) 39'
FW	10	Adama Ba		(substituted on) 62'
MF	26	Beyatt Lekweiry		(substituted on) 62'
GK	1	M'Backé N'Diaye		(substituted on) 81'
MF	24	Yacoub Sidi Ethmane		(substituted on) 81'
Manager:
(France) Didier Gomes Da Rosa

Man of the Match:
Moussa Doumbia (Mali)

Assistant referees:
Seydou Tiama (Burkina Faso)
Lionel Andrianantenaina (Madagascar)
Fourth official:
Maguette N'Diaye (Senegal)
Video assistant referee:
Adil Zourak (Morocco)
Assistant video assistant referee:
Zakaria Brinsi (Morocco)
