= 2023 Africa Cup of Nations squads =

The 2023 Africa Cup of Nations was an international football tournament held in the Ivory Coast from 13 January to 11 February 2024. The 24 participating national teams were required to register a squad with a minimum of 23 and a maximum 27 players, an increase of up to four players over the regular number of 23 allowed in the tournament's regulations. Only players in these squads were eligible to take part in the tournament.

On 15 December 2023, the Confederation of African Football (CAF) announced the increase of the maximum number of players included on the final lists from 23 to 27. However, the inclusion of the four extra players was optional and teams could still only name a maximum of 23 players on the match list for each tournament fixture (of which twelve were substitutes).

Each national team had to submit a provisional list of up to fifty five players to CAF no later than 14 December 2023. The final list of up to 27 players per national team had to be submitted to CAF General Secretariat by 3 January 2024, ten days before the opening match of the tournament. A player on the submitted final list could only be replaced in the event of serious injury at the latest 24 hours before the beginning of his team's first match of the tournament, provided that it was approved by the CAF Medical Committee.

CAF published the provisional lists on 20 December 2023. The final squads were released by CAF on 6 January 2024.

The age listed for each player is on 13 January 2024, the first day of the tournament. The numbers of caps and goals listed for each player do not include any matches played after the start of the tournament. The club listed is the club for which the player last played a competitive match before the tournament. (Note: This is the club a player was last able to play for during the previous season in the event a player did not play a competitive match.) The nationality for each club reflects the national association (not the league) to which the club is affiliated. A flag is included for coaches who are of a different nationality than their own national team.

== Group A ==
=== Ivory Coast ===
Ivory Coast's 54-man provisional list was announced by CAF on 20 December 2023. The final squad of 27 players was announced on 28 December.

Head coach: (France) Jean-Louis Gasset (group stage); Emerse Faé (knockout stage)

No.	Pos.	Player	Date of birth (age)	Caps	Goals	Club
1	GK	Yahia Fofana	21 August 2000 (aged 23)	5	0	(French Football Federation) Angers
2	DF	Ousmane Diomande	4 December 2003 (aged 20)	3	0	(Portuguese Football Federation) Sporting CP
3	DF	Ghislain Konan	27 December 1995 (aged 28)	30	0	(Saudi Arabian Football Federation) Al-Fayha
4	MF	Jean Michaël Seri	19 July 1991 (aged 32)	49	4	(The Football Association) Hull City
5	DF	Wilfried Singo	25 December 2000 (aged 23)	10	0	(French Football Federation) Monaco
6	MF	Seko Fofana	7 May 1995 (aged 28)	12	5	(Saudi Arabian Football Federation) Al-Nassr
7	DF	Odilon Kossounou	4 January 2001 (aged 23)	18	0	(German Football Association) Bayer Leverkusen
8	MF	Franck Kessié	19 December 1996 (aged 27)	68	8	(Saudi Arabian Football Federation) Al-Ahli
9	FW	Jonathan Bamba	26 March 1996 (aged 27)	4	0	(Royal Spanish Football Federation) Celta Vigo
10	FW	Karim Konaté	21 March 2004 (aged 19)	9	2	(Austrian Football Association) Red Bull Salzburg
11	FW	Jean-Philippe Krasso	17 July 1997 (aged 26)	9	3	(Football Association of Serbia) Red Star Belgrade
12	DF	Willy Boly	3 February 1991 (aged 32)	15	1	(The Football Association) Nottingham Forest
13	MF	Jérémie Boga	3 January 1997 (aged 27)	14	1	(French Football Federation) Nice
14	MF	Oumar Diakité	20 December 2003 (aged 20)	5	0	(French Football Federation) Reims
15	MF	Max Gradel	30 November 1987 (aged 36)	106	17	(Turkish Football Federation) Gaziantep
16	GK	Charles Folly Ayayi	29 December 1990 (aged 33)	2	0	(Ivorian Football Federation) ASEC Mimosas
17	DF	Serge Aurier (captain)	24 December 1992 (aged 31)	87	4	(The Football Association) Nottingham Forest
18	MF	Ibrahim Sangaré	2 December 1997 (aged 26)	35	11	(The Football Association) Nottingham Forest
19	FW	Nicolas Pépé	29 May 1995 (aged 28)	37	10	(Turkish Football Federation) Trabzonspor
20	FW	Christian Kouamé	6 December 1997 (aged 26)	24	3	(Italian Football Federation) Fiorentina
21	DF	Evan Ndicka	20 August 1999 (aged 24)	5	0	(Italian Football Federation) Roma
22	FW	Sébastien Haller	22 June 1994 (aged 29)	21	8	(German Football Association) Borussia Dortmund
23	GK	Badra Ali Sangaré	30 May 1986 (aged 37)	30	0	(South African Football Association) Sekhukhune United
24	MF	Simon Adingra	1 January 2002 (aged 22)	5	1	(The Football Association) Brighton & Hove Albion
25	MF	Idrissa Doumbia	14 April 1998 (aged 25)	1	0	(Qatar Football Association) Al-Ahli
26	DF	Ismaël Diallo	29 January 1997 (aged 26)	0	0	(Croatian Football Federation) Hajduk Split
27	MF	Jean Thierry Lazare	7 March 1998 (aged 25)	1	0	(Royal Belgian Football Association) Union Saint-Gilloise

=== Nigeria ===
Nigeria's 41-man provisional list was announced by CAF on 20 December 2023. The final squad of 25 players was announced on 29 December. On 3 January 2024, Wilfred Ndidi withdrew due to an injury and was replaced by Alhassan Yusuf. On 9 January, Victor Boniface withdrew due to an injury and was replaced by Terem Moffi. On 12 January, Umar Sadiq sustained an injury and was replaced by Paul Onuachu.

Head coach: (Portugal) José Peseiro

No.	Pos.	Player	Date of birth (age)	Caps	Goals	Club
1	GK	Francis Uzoho	28 October 1998 (aged 25)	34	0	(Cyprus Football Association) Omonia
2	DF	Ola Aina	8 October 1996 (aged 27)	33	0	(The Football Association) Nottingham Forest
3	DF	Zaidu Sanusi	13 June 1997 (aged 26)	15	0	(Portuguese Football Federation) Porto
4	MF	Alhassan Yusuf	18 July 2000 (aged 23)	0	0	(Royal Belgian Football Association) Royal Antwerp
5	DF	William Troost-Ekong (captain)	1 September 1993 (aged 30)	63	4	(Hellenic Football Federation) PAOK
6	DF	Semi Ajayi	9 November 1993 (aged 30)	27	1	(The Football Association) West Bromwich Albion
7	FW	Ahmed Musa	14 October 1992 (aged 31)	107	16	(Turkish Football Federation) Sivasspor
8	MF	Frank Onyeka	1 January 1998 (aged 26)	16	1	(The Football Association) Brentford
9	FW	Victor Osimhen	29 December 1998 (aged 25)	27	20	(Italian Football Federation) Napoli
10	MF	Joe Aribo	21 July 1996 (aged 27)	28	2	(The Football Association) Southampton
11	FW	Samuel Chukwueze	22 May 1999 (aged 24)	30	5	(Italian Football Federation) Milan
12	DF	Bright Osayi-Samuel	31 December 1997 (aged 26)	8	0	(Turkish Football Federation) Fenerbahçe
13	DF	Bruno Onyemaechi	3 April 1999 (aged 24)	5	0	(Portuguese Football Federation) Boavista
14	FW	Kelechi Iheanacho	3 October 1996 (aged 27)	48	14	(The Football Association) Leicester City
15	FW	Moses Simon	12 July 1995 (aged 28)	62	9	(French Football Federation) Nantes
16	GK	Olorunleke Ojo	17 August 1995 (aged 28)	0	0	(Nigeria Football Federation) Enyimba
17	MF	Alex Iwobi	3 May 1996 (aged 27)	67	10	(The Football Association) Fulham
18	FW	Ademola Lookman	20 October 1997 (aged 26)	11	2	(Italian Football Federation) Atalanta
19	FW	Paul Onuachu	28 May 1994 (aged 29)	18	3	(Turkish Football Federation) Trabzonspor
20	DF	Chidozie Awaziem	1 January 1997 (aged 27)	28	1	(Portuguese Football Federation) Boavista
21	DF	Calvin Bassey	31 December 1999 (aged 24)	15	0	(The Football Association) Fulham
22	DF	Kenneth Omeruo	17 October 1993 (aged 30)	61	1	(Turkish Football Federation) Kasımpaşa
23	GK	Stanley Nwabali	10 June 1996 (aged 27)	1	0	(South African Football Association) Chippa United
24	FW	Terem Moffi	25 May 1999 (aged 24)	12	4	(French Football Federation) Nice
25	MF	Raphael Onyedika	19 April 2001 (aged 22)	3	0	(Royal Belgian Football Association) Club Brugge

=== Equatorial Guinea ===
Equatorial Guinea's 50-man provisional list was announced by CAF on 20 December 2023. The final squad of 27 players was announced on 31 December.

Head coach: Juan Michá

No.	Pos.	Player	Date of birth (age)	Caps	Goals	Club
1	GK	Jesús Owono	1 March 2001 (aged 22)	24	0	(Royal Spanish Football Federation) Alavés
2	DF	Néstor Senra	4 January 2002 (aged 22)	7	0	(Royal Spanish Football Federation) Avilés
3	DF	Marvin Anieboh	26 August 1997 (aged 26)	11	0	(Royal Spanish Football Federation) Illescas
4	MF	Federico Bikoro	17 March 1996 (aged 27)	47	6	(Tunisian Football Federation) Club Africain
5	DF	José Elo	21 October 2000 (aged 23)	4	1	(Royal Spanish Football Federation) Mérida
6	MF	Iban Salvador	11 December 1995 (aged 28)	38	5	(Polish Football Association) Miedź Legnica
7	MF	José Machín	14 August 1996 (aged 27)	23	0	(Italian Football Federation) Monza
8	MF	Jannick Buyla	6 October 1998 (aged 25)	19	1	(Royal Spanish Football Federation) Logroñés
9	FW	Salomón Obama	4 February 2000 (aged 23)	15	1	(Andorran Football Federation) Santa Coloma
10	FW	Emilio Nsue (captain)	30 September 1989 (aged 34)	40	17	(Royal Spanish Football Federation) Intercity
11	DF	Basilio Ndong	17 January 1999 (aged 24)	41	0	(Romanian Football Federation) Universitatea Craiova
12	DF	Charles Ondo	22 October 2003 (aged 20)	3	0	(The Football Association) Huddersfield Town
13	GK	Aitor Embela	17 April 1996 (aged 27)	9	0	(Royal Spanish Football Federation) Soneja
14	MF	Álex Balboa	6 March 2001 (aged 22)	12	0	(Royal Spanish Football Federation) Huesca
15	DF	Carlos Akapo	12 March 1993 (aged 30)	33	2	(United States Soccer Federation) San Jose Earthquakes
16	DF	Saúl Coco	9 February 1999 (aged 24)	19	3	(Royal Spanish Football Federation) Las Palmas
17	FW	Josete Miranda	22 July 1998 (aged 25)	41	2	(Hellenic Football Federation) Niki Volos
18	FW	Noé Ela	17 April 2003 (aged 20)	4	0	(Royal Spanish Football Federation) Numancia
19	FW	Luis Nlavo	9 July 2001 (aged 22)	14	2	(Portuguese Football Federation) Braga
20	MF	Santiago Eneme	29 September 2000 (aged 23)	21	0	(Football Association of the Czech Republic) MFK Vyškov
21	DF	Esteban Obiang	7 May 1998 (aged 25)	25	1	(Romanian Football Federation) Argeș Pitești
22	MF	Pablo Ganet	4 November 1994 (aged 29)	39	4	(Royal Spanish Football Federation) Alcoyano
23	GK	Manuel Sapunga	23 November 1992 (aged 31)	2	0	(South African Football Association) Polokwane City
24	DF	Hugo Buyla	8 March 2005 (aged 18)	1	0	(Italian Football Federation) Sampdoria
25	MF	Federico Nsue	20 April 1997 (aged 26)	3	0	(Moldovan Football Federation) Bălți
26	FW	José Nabil Ondo	23 November 2005 (aged 18)	1	0	(Equatoguinean Football Federation) Cano Sport
27	FW	Óscar Siafá	12 September 1997 (aged 26)	13	0	(Italian Football Federation) Alessandria

=== Guinea-Bissau ===
Guinea-Bissau's 39-man provisional list was announced by CAF on 20 December 2023. The final squad of 27 players was announced on 5 January 2024. Goalkeeper Celton Biai has declined the invitation as he wanted to focus on his club.

Head coach: Baciro Candé

No.	Pos.	Player	Date of birth (age)	Caps	Goals	Club
1	GK	Jonas Mendes (captain)	20 November 1989 (aged 34)	56	0	(Hellenic Football Federation) Kalamata
2	DF	Fali Candé	24 January 1998 (aged 25)	19	0	(French Football Federation) Metz
3	FW	Franculino Djú	28 June 2004 (aged 19)	3	1	(Danish Football Association) Midtjylland
4	DF	Marcelo Djaló	8 October 1993 (aged 30)	15	1	(Royal Spanish Football Federation) Palencia Atlético
5	DF	Houboulang Mendes	4 May 1998 (aged 25)	2	0	(Royal Spanish Football Federation) Almería
6	MF	Nito Gomes	3 February 2002 (aged 21)	2	1	(Portuguese Football Federation) Marítimo
7	FW	Dálcio	22 May 1996 (aged 27)	13	0	(Cyprus Football Association) APOEL
8	MF	Alfa Semedo	30 August 1997 (aged 26)	19	2	(Saudi Arabian Football Federation) Al-Tai
9	FW	Zinho Gano	13 October 1993 (aged 30)	5	4	(Royal Belgian Football Association) Zulte Waregem
10	MF	Carlos Mané	11 March 1994 (aged 29)	1	0	(Turkish Football Federation) Kayserispor
11	FW	Marciano Tchami	6 November 2004 (aged 19)	1	0	(Royal Spanish Football Federation) Almeria
12	GK	Ouparine Djoco	22 April 1998 (aged 25)	2	0	(Royal Belgian Football Association) Francs Borains
13	MF	Carlos Mendes Gomes	14 November 1998 (aged 25)	1	0	(The Football Association) Bolton Wanderers
14	FW	Mauro Rodrigues	15 April 2001 (aged 22)	11	2	(Swiss Football Association) Yverdon-Sport
15	DF	Jefferson Encada	17 April 1998 (aged 25)	16	0	(Egyptian Football Association) Pharco
16	MF	Moreto Cassamá	16 February 1998 (aged 25)	19	0	(Cyprus Football Association) Omonia
17	FW	Mama Baldé	6 November 1995 (aged 28)	21	3	(French Football Federation) Lyon
18	FW	Famana Quizera	25 April 2002 (aged 21)	3	0	(Portuguese Football Federation) Académico Viseu
19	MF	Janio Bikel	28 June 1995 (aged 28)	8	0	(Turkish Football Federation) Gaziantep
20	DF	Sori Mané	3 April 1996 (aged 27)	31	0	(Portuguese Football Federation) Académico Viseu
21	DF	Nanu	17 May 1994 (aged 29)	23	0	(Turkish Football Federation) Samsunspor
22	DF	Opa Sanganté	1 February 1991 (aged 32)	20	0	(French Football Federation) Dunkerque
23	GK	Fernando Embadje	6 July 2003 (aged 20)	0	0	(Royal Spanish Football Federation) Lugo
24	FW	Zé Turbo	22 October 1996 (aged 27)	1	0	(Russian Football Union) Pari NN
25	DF	Edgar Ié	1 May 1994 (aged 29)	1	0	(Turkish Football Federation) İstanbul Başakşehir
26	FW	Zidane Banjaqui	15 December 1998 (aged 25)	1	1	(Portuguese Football Federation) Feirense
27	DF	Prosper Mendy	7 June 1996 (aged 27)	3	0	(Royal Belgian Football Association) Olympic Charleroi

== Group B ==
=== Egypt ===
Egypt's 55-man provisional list was announced by CAF on 20 December 2023. The final squad of 27 players was announced on 30 December. On 3 January 2024, midfielder Ahmed Nabil Koka and defender Osama Galal withdrew from the squad due to injuries and were replaced by Mohanad Lasheen and Yasser Ibrahim, respectively.

Head coach: (Portugal) Rui Vitória

No.	Pos.	Player	Date of birth (age)	Caps	Goals	Club
1	GK	Ahmed El Shenawy	14 May 1991 (aged 32)	31	0	(Egyptian Football Association) Pyramids
2	DF	Ali Gabr	10 January 1989 (aged 35)	38	1	(Egyptian Football Association) Pyramids
3	DF	Mohamed Hany	2 February 1996 (aged 27)	14	0	(Egyptian Football Association) Al Ahly
4	DF	Omar Kamal	29 September 1993 (aged 30)	17	1	(Egyptian Football Association) Future
5	MF	Hamdy Fathy	29 September 1994 (aged 29)	34	3	(Qatar Football Association) Al-Wakrah
6	DF	Ahmed Hegazi	25 January 1991 (aged 32)	83	2	(Saudi Arabian Football Federation) Al-Ittihad
7	FW	Trézéguet	1 October 1994 (aged 29)	66	14	(Turkish Football Federation) Trabzonspor
8	MF	Emam Ashour	20 February 1998 (aged 25)	11	0	(Egyptian Football Association) Al Ahly
9	FW	Koka	5 March 1993 (aged 30)	31	6	(Turkish Football Federation) Pendikspor
10	FW	Mohamed Salah (captain)	15 June 1992 (aged 31)	94	53	(The Football Association) Liverpool
11	FW	Kahraba	13 April 1994 (aged 29)	30	5	(Egyptian Football Association) Al Ahly
12	DF	Mohamed Hamdy	15 March 1995 (aged 28)	12	0	(Egyptian Football Association) Pyramids
13	DF	Ahmed Fatouh	22 March 1998 (aged 25)	25	1	(Egyptian Football Association) Zamalek
14	MF	Marwan Attia	12 August 1998 (aged 25)	6	0	(Egyptian Football Association) Al Ahly
15	DF	Yasser Ibrahim	10 February 1993 (aged 30)	6	0	(Egyptian Football Association) Al Ahly
16	GK	Mohamed El Shenawy	18 December 1988 (aged 35)	51	0	(Egyptian Football Association) Al Ahly
17	MF	Mohamed Elneny	11 July 1992 (aged 31)	96	8	(The Football Association) Arsenal
18	FW	Mostafa Fathi	12 May 1994 (aged 29)	23	2	(Egyptian Football Association) Pyramids
19	FW	Mostafa Mohamed	28 November 1997 (aged 26)	32	8	(French Football Federation) Nantes
20	MF	Mahmoud Hamada	1 June 1994 (aged 29)	10	0	(Egyptian Football Association) Al Masry
21	DF	Ahmed Samy	1 April 1992 (aged 31)	1	0	(Egyptian Football Association) Pyramids
22	FW	Omar Marmoush	7 February 1999 (aged 24)	24	4	(German Football Association) Eintracht Frankfurt
23	GK	Gabaski	29 January 1989 (aged 34)	9	0	(Egyptian Football Association) National Bank of Egypt
24	DF	Mohamed Abdelmonem	1 February 1999 (aged 24)	20	2	(Egyptian Football Association) Al Ahly
25	MF	Zizo	10 January 1996 (aged 28)	34	2	(Egyptian Football Association) Zamalek
26	GK	Mohamed Sobhy	15 July 1999 (aged 24)	3	0	(Egyptian Football Association) Zamalek
27	MF	Mohanad Lasheen	29 May 1996 (aged 27)	9	0	(Egyptian Football Association) Pyramids

=== Ghana ===
Ghana announced their 55-man provisional list on 20 December 2023. The final squad of 27 players was announced on 1 January 2024.

Head coach: (Republic of Ireland) Chris Hughton

No.	Pos.	Player	Date of birth (age)	Caps	Goals	Club
1	GK	Richard Ofori	1 November 1993 (aged 30)	28	0	(South African Football Association) Orlando Pirates
2	DF	Alidu Seidu	4 June 2000 (aged 23)	10	0	(French Football Federation) Clermont
3	DF	Denis Odoi	27 May 1988 (aged 35)	9	0	(Royal Belgian Football Association) Club Brugge
4	DF	Nicholas Opoku	11 August 1997 (aged 26)	18	1	(French Football Federation) Amiens
5	FW	Kingsley Schindler	12 July 1993 (aged 30)	4	0	(Turkish Football Federation) Samsunspor
6	DF	Mohammed Salisu	17 April 1999 (aged 24)	6	2	(French Football Federation) Monaco
7	FW	Ransford Yeboah	13 September 2001 (aged 22)	2	0	(German Football Association) Hamburger SV
8	MF	Majeed Ashimeru	10 October 1997 (aged 26)	5	0	(Royal Belgian Football Association) Anderlecht
9	FW	Jordan Ayew	11 September 1991 (aged 32)	93	19	(The Football Association) Crystal Palace
10	FW	André Ayew (captain)	17 December 1989 (aged 34)	114	24	(French Football Federation) Le Havre
11	FW	Osman Bukari	13 December 1998 (aged 25)	14	3	(Football Association of Serbia) Red Star Belgrade
12	GK	Jojo Wollacott	8 September 1996 (aged 27)	11	0	(Scottish Football Association) Hibernian
13	FW	Joseph Paintsil	1 February 1998 (aged 25)	11	0	(Royal Belgian Football Association) Genk
14	DF	Gideon Mensah	18 July 1998 (aged 25)	20	0	(French Football Federation) Auxerre
15	MF	Elisha Owusu	7 November 1997 (aged 26)	6	0	(French Football Federation) Auxerre
16	GK	Lawrence Ati-Zigi	29 November 1996 (aged 27)	18	0	(Swiss Football Association) St. Gallen
17	DF	Abdul Fatawu Hamidu	4 March 1999 (aged 24)	1	0	(Ghana Football Association) Medeama
18	DF	Daniel Amartey	21 December 1994 (aged 29)	53	0	(Turkish Football Federation) Beşiktaş
19	FW	Iñaki Williams	15 June 1994 (aged 29)	13	1	(Royal Spanish Football Federation) Athletic Bilbao
20	MF	Mohammed Kudus	2 August 2000 (aged 23)	30	9	(The Football Association) West Ham United
21	MF	Salis Abdul Samed	26 March 2000 (aged 23)	12	0	(French Football Federation) Lens
22	MF	Richmond Lamptey	18 March 1997 (aged 26)	1	0	(Ghana Football Association) Asante Kotoko
23	DF	Alexander Djiku	9 August 1994 (aged 29)	23	1	(Turkish Football Federation) Fenerbahçe
24	FW	Ernest Nuamah	1 November 2003 (aged 20)	7	2	(French Football Federation) Lyon
25	FW	Antoine Semenyo	7 January 2000 (aged 24)	14	2	(The Football Association) Bournemouth
26	MF	Iddrisu Baba	22 January 1996 (aged 27)	24	0	(Royal Spanish Football Federation) Almería
27	FW	Jonathan Sowah	9 January 2000 (aged 24)	2	0	(Ghana Football Association) Medeama

=== Cape Verde ===
Cape Verde's 53-man provisional list was announced by CAF on 20 December 2023. The final squad of 26 players was announced on 28 December. On 1 January 2024, Djaniny withdrew due to an injury and was replaced by Gilson Tavares. Hélio Varela and João Correia have declined their invitation to play in the tournament, as they want to focus on their club. There were no replacements called up, leaving the roster with just 24 players.

Head coach: Bubista

No.	Pos.	Player	Date of birth (age)	Caps	Goals	Club
1	GK	Vozinha	3 June 1986 (aged 37)	65	0	(Slovak Football Association) Trenčín
2	DF	Stopira (captain)	20 May 1988 (aged 35)	56	3	(Cape Verdean Football Federation) Boavista
3	DF	Diney	17 January 1995 (aged 28)	18	0	(United Arab Emirates Football Association) Al Bataeh
4	DF	Roberto Lopes	17 June 1992 (aged 31)	22	0	(Football Association of Ireland) Shamrock Rovers
5	DF	Logan Costa	1 April 2001 (aged 22)	8	0	(French Football Federation) Toulouse
6	MF	Patrick Andrade	9 February 1993 (aged 30)	19	0	(Association of Football Federations of Azerbaijan) Qarabağ
7	FW	Jovane Cabral	14 June 1998 (aged 25)	5	0	(Italian Football Federation) Salernitana
8	MF	João Paulo	26 May 1998 (aged 25)	16	1	(Moldovan Football Federation) Sheriff Tiraspol
9	FW	Gilson Tavares	29 December 2001 (aged 22)	10	4	(Portuguese Football Federation) Benfica
10	MF	Jamiro Monteiro	23 November 1993 (aged 30)	31	3	(United States Soccer Federation) San Jose Earthquakes
11	FW	Garry Rodrigues	27 November 1990 (aged 33)	45	7	(Turkish Football Federation) Ankaragücü
12	GK	Márcio Rosa	23 February 1997 (aged 26)	8	0	(Portuguese Football Federation) Anadia
13	MF	Cuca	9 January 1991 (aged 33)	9	0	(Portuguese Football Federation) União Leiria
14	MF	Deroy Duarte	4 July 1999 (aged 24)	11	0	(Royal Dutch Football Association) Fortuna Sittard
15	MF	Laros Duarte	28 February 1997 (aged 26)	0	0	(Royal Dutch Football Association) Groningen
16	DF	Dylan Tavares	30 August 1996 (aged 27)	19	1	(French Football Federation) Bastia
17	FW	Willy Semedo	27 April 1994 (aged 29)	18	0	(Cyprus Football Association) Omonia
18	MF	Kenny Rocha	3 January 2000 (aged 24)	24	2	(Cyprus Football Association) AEZ Zakakiou
19	FW	Bryan Teixeira	1 September 2000 (aged 23)	5	0	(Austrian Football Association) Sturm Graz
20	FW	Ryan Mendes	8 January 1990 (aged 34)	66	15	(Turkish Football Federation) Fatih Karagümrük
21	FW	Bebé	12 July 1990 (aged 33)	15	4	(Royal Spanish Football Federation) Rayo Vallecano
23	DF	Steven Moreira	13 August 1994 (aged 29)	1	0	(United States Soccer Federation) Columbus Crew
24	GK	Dylan Silva	10 February 1999 (aged 24)	0	0	(Portuguese Football Federation) Sintrense
26	MF	Kevin Pina	27 January 1997 (aged 26)	5	1	(Russian Football Union) Krasnodar

=== Mozambique ===
Mozambique announced their 46-man provisional list on 6 December 2023. The final squad of 23 players was announced on 22 December.

Head coach: Chiquinho Conde

No.	Pos.	Player	Date of birth (age)	Caps	Goals	Club
1	GK	Ernan Siluane	9 July 1998 (aged 25)	26	0	(Mozambican Football Federation) Songo
2	DF	Nanani	8 February 1996 (aged 27)	21	0	(Mozambican Football Federation) Songo
3	DF	David Malembana	11 October 1995 (aged 28)	4	0	(Football Federation of Armenia) Noah
4	DF	Nené	15 November 1996 (aged 27)	25	1	(Mozambican Football Federation) Black Bulls
5	DF	Bruno Langa	31 October 1997 (aged 26)	18	1	(Portuguese Football Federation) Chaves
6	MF	Amadú	3 December 1996 (aged 27)	26	0	(Mozambican Football Federation) Ferroviário Beira
7	MF	Domingues (captain)	13 November 1983 (aged 40)	106	16	(Mozambican Football Federation) Songo
8	DF	Edmilson Dove	18 July 1994 (aged 29)	39	0	(South African Football Association) Kaizer Chiefs
9	FW	Lau King	4 September 1995 (aged 28)	18	3	(Angolan Football Federation) Sagrada Esperança
10	FW	Clésio	11 October 1994 (aged 29)	47	8	(Football Association of Finland) Honka
11	MF	João Bonde	9 January 1997 (aged 27)	12	0	(Mozambican Football Federation) Ferroviário Beira
12	GK	Fazito	9 June 2003 (aged 20)	3	0	(Mozambican Football Federation) Ferroviário Nampula
13	FW	Stanley Ratifo	5 December 1994 (aged 29)	25	4	(German Football Association) 1. CfR Pforzheim
14	DF	Domingos Macandza	17 June 1998 (aged 25)	17	0	(Mozambican Football Federation) Costa do Sol
15	DF	Reinildo Mandava	21 January 1994 (aged 29)	33	2	(Royal Spanish Football Federation) Atlético Madrid
16	MF	Alfons Amade	12 November 1999 (aged 24)	0	0	(Royal Belgian Football Association) Oostende
17	DF	Mexer	8 September 1988 (aged 35)	59	3	(Turkish Football Federation) Bandırmaspor
18	FW	Gildo	31 January 1995 (aged 28)	31	3	(Portuguese Football Federation) Covilhã
19	FW	Witi	26 August 1996 (aged 27)	34	3	(Portuguese Football Federation) Nacional
20	FW	Geny Catamo	26 January 2001 (aged 22)	20	5	(Portuguese Football Federation) Sporting CP
21	MF	Guima	14 November 1995 (aged 28)	5	1	(Portuguese Football Federation) Chaves
22	GK	Ivane Urrubal	1 March 1997 (aged 26)	8	0	(Mozambican Football Federation) Black Bulls
23	MF	Shaquille	24 November 1997 (aged 26)	36	0	(Mozambican Football Federation) Ferroviário Maputo

== Group C ==
=== Senegal ===
Senegal's 55-man provisional list was announced by CAF on 20 December 2023. The final squad of 27 players was announced on 29 December. On 9 January 2024, Seny Dieng and Boulaye Dia withdrew injured and were replaced by Alfred Gomis and Bamba Dieng.

Head coach: Aliou Cissé

No.	Pos.	Player	Date of birth (age)	Caps	Goals	Club
1	GK	Alfred Gomis	5 September 1994 (aged 29)	13	0	(French Football Federation) Lorient
2	DF	Formose Mendy	2 January 2001 (aged 23)	5	0	(French Football Federation) Lorient
3	DF	Kalidou Koulibaly (captain)	20 June 1991 (aged 32)	74	1	(Saudi Arabian Football Federation) Al-Hilal
4	DF	Abdoulaye Seck	4 June 1992 (aged 31)	8	1	(Israel Football Association) Maccabi Haifa
5	MF	Idrissa Gueye	26 September 1989 (aged 34)	101	7	(The Football Association) Everton
6	MF	Nampalys Mendy	23 June 1992 (aged 31)	28	0	(French Football Federation) Lens
7	FW	Nicolas Jackson	20 June 2001 (aged 22)	6	0	(The Football Association) Chelsea
8	MF	Cheikhou Kouyaté	21 December 1989 (aged 34)	85	4	(The Football Association) Nottingham Forest
9	FW	Bamba Dieng	23 March 2000 (aged 23)	26	6	(French Football Federation) Lorient
10	FW	Sadio Mané	10 April 1992 (aged 31)	98	39	(Saudi Arabian Football Federation) Al-Nassr
11	MF	Pathé Ciss	16 March 1994 (aged 29)	12	0	(Royal Spanish Football Federation) Rayo Vallecano
12	DF	Fodé Ballo-Touré	3 January 1997 (aged 27)	15	0	(The Football Association) Fulham
13	FW	Iliman Ndiaye	6 March 2000 (aged 23)	11	1	(French Football Federation) Marseille
14	DF	Ismail Jakobs	17 August 1999 (aged 24)	12	0	(French Football Federation) Monaco
15	MF	Krépin Diatta	25 February 1999 (aged 24)	37	2	(French Football Federation) Monaco
16	GK	Édouard Mendy	1 March 1992 (aged 31)	32	0	(Saudi Arabian Football Federation) Al-Ahli
17	MF	Pape Matar Sarr	14 September 2002 (aged 21)	18	1	(The Football Association) Tottenham Hotspur
18	FW	Ismaïla Sarr	25 February 1998 (aged 25)	55	11	(French Football Federation) Marseille
19	DF	Moussa Niakhaté	8 March 1996 (aged 27)	7	0	(The Football Association) Nottingham Forest
20	FW	Habib Diallo	18 June 1995 (aged 28)	21	4	(Saudi Arabian Football Federation) Al-Shabab
21	DF	Youssouf Sabaly	5 March 1993 (aged 30)	32	1	(Royal Spanish Football Federation) Real Betis
22	DF	Abdou Diallo	4 May 1996 (aged 27)	26	2	(Qatar Football Association) Al-Arabi
23	GK	Mory Diaw	22 June 1993 (aged 30)	1	0	(French Football Federation) Clermont
24	FW	Abdallah Sima	17 June 2001 (aged 22)	4	0	(Scottish Football Association) Rangers
25	MF	Lamine Camara	1 January 2004 (aged 20)	17	5	(French Football Federation) Metz
26	MF	Pape Gueye	24 January 1999 (aged 24)	17	0	(French Football Federation) Marseille
27	DF	Abdoulaye Ndiaye	10 April 2002 (aged 21)	0	0	(French Football Federation) Troyes

=== Cameroon ===
Cameroon's 49-man provisional list was announced by CAF on 20 December 2023. The final squad of 27 players was announced on 28 December. Forward François Mughe declined his call-up for the tournament and was replaced by Moumi Ngamaleu on 4 January 2024.

Head coach: Rigobert Song

No.	Pos.	Player	Date of birth (age)	Caps	Goals	Club
1	GK	Fabrice Ondoa	24 December 1995 (aged 28)	49	0	(French Football Federation) Nîmes
2	DF	Harold Moukoudi	27 November 1997 (aged 26)	15	0	(Hellenic Football Federation) AEK Athens
3	FW	Moumi Ngamaleu	9 July 1994 (aged 29)	51	4	(Russian Football Union) Dynamo Moscow
4	DF	Christopher Wooh	18 September 2001 (aged 22)	9	1	(French Football Federation) Rennes
5	DF	Nouhou Tolo	23 June 1997 (aged 26)	27	0	(United States Soccer Federation) Seattle Sounders FC
6	MF	Olivier Kemen	20 July 1996 (aged 27)	5	1	(Turkish Football Federation) Kayserispor
7	FW	Clinton N'Jie	15 August 1993 (aged 30)	44	10	(Turkish Football Federation) Sivasspor
8	MF	André-Frank Zambo Anguissa	16 November 1995 (aged 28)	52	5	(Italian Football Federation) Napoli
9	FW	Frank Magri	4 September 1999 (aged 24)	4	1	(French Football Federation) Toulouse
10	FW	Vincent Aboubakar (captain)	22 January 1992 (aged 31)	99	37	(Turkish Football Federation) Beşiktaş
11	FW	Georges-Kévin Nkoudou	13 February 1995 (aged 28)	6	1	(Saudi Arabian Football Federation) Damac
12	FW	Karl Toko Ekambi	14 September 1992 (aged 31)	58	13	(Saudi Arabian Football Federation) Abha
13	FW	Leonel Ateba	6 February 1999 (aged 24)	1	0	(Cameroonian Football Federation) PWD Bamenda
14	DF	Junior Tchamadeu	22 December 2003 (aged 20)	2	0	(The Football Association) Stoke City
15	DF	Oumar Gonzalez	25 February 1998 (aged 25)	6	0	(Saudi Arabian Football Federation) Al Raed
16	GK	Devis Epassy	2 February 1993 (aged 30)	9	0	(Saudi Arabian Football Federation) Abha
17	MF	Yvan Neyou	3 January 1997 (aged 27)	6	0	(Royal Spanish Football Federation) Leganés
18	DF	Darlin Yongwa	21 September 2000 (aged 23)	6	1	(French Football Federation) Lorient
19	FW	Faris Moumbagna	1 July 2000 (aged 23)	2	0	(Norwegian Football Federation) Bodø/Glimt
20	MF	Benjamin Elliott	5 November 2002 (aged 21)	4	0	(The Football Association) Reading
21	DF	Jean-Charles Castelletto	26 January 1995 (aged 28)	23	1	(French Football Federation) Nantes
22	MF	Olivier Ntcham	9 February 1996 (aged 27)	10	1	(Turkish Football Federation) Samsunspor
23	GK	Simon Ngapandouetnbu	12 April 2003 (aged 20)	0	0	(French Football Federation) Marseille
24	GK	André Onana	2 April 1996 (aged 27)	37	0	(The Football Association) Manchester United
25	DF	Malcom Bokele	12 February 2000 (aged 23)	2	0	(French Football Federation) Bordeaux
26	DF	Enzo Tchato	23 November 2002 (aged 21)	1	0	(French Football Federation) Montpellier
27	MF	Wilfried Nathan Douala	15 May 2006 (aged 17)	0	0	(Cameroonian Football Federation) Victoria United

=== Guinea ===
Guinea's 49-man provisional list was announced by CAF on 20 December 2023. The final squad of 25 players was announced on 23 December.

Head coach: Kaba Diawara

No.	Pos.	Player	Date of birth (age)	Caps	Goals	Club
1	GK	Aly Keita	8 December 1986 (aged 37)	24	0	(Swedish Football Association) Östersund
2	DF	Antoine Conte	29 January 1994 (aged 29)	11	0	(Bulgarian Football Union) Botev Plovdiv
3	DF	Issiaga Sylla	1 January 1994 (aged 30)	73	3	(French Football Federation) Montpellier
4	DF	Saïdou Sow	4 July 2002 (aged 21)	21	1	(French Football Federation) Strasbourg
5	DF	Mouctar Diakhaby	19 December 1996 (aged 27)	9	1	(Royal Spanish Football Federation) Valencia
6	MF	Amadou Diawara	17 July 1997 (aged 26)	37	0	(Royal Belgian Football Association) Anderlecht
7	FW	Morgan Guilavogui	10 March 1998 (aged 25)	15	2	(French Football Federation) Lens
8	MF	Naby Keïta (captain)	10 February 1995 (aged 28)	53	12	(German Football Association) Werder Bremen
9	FW	Serhou Guirassy	12 March 1996 (aged 27)	12	3	(German Football Association) VfB Stuttgart
10	MF	Ilaix Moriba	19 January 2003 (aged 20)	19	1	(German Football Association) RB Leipzig
11	FW	Mohamed Bayo	4 June 1998 (aged 25)	18	4	(French Football Federation) Le Havre
12	DF	Ibrahim Diakité	31 October 2003 (aged 20)	3	0	(French Football Federation) Reims
13	DF	Mohamed Ali Camara	28 August 1997 (aged 26)	21	0	(Swiss Football Association) Young Boys
14	MF	Karim Cissé	14 November 2004 (aged 19)	3	0	(French Football Federation) Saint-Étienne
15	MF	Seydouba Cissé	10 February 2001 (aged 22)	11	1	(Royal Spanish Football Federation) Leganés
16	GK	Moussa Camara	27 November 1998 (aged 25)	21	0	(Guinean Football Federation) Horoya
17	DF	Julian Jeanvier	31 March 1992 (aged 31)	8	0	(Turkish Football Federation) Kayserispor
18	MF	Aguibou Camara	20 May 2001 (aged 22)	23	3	(Hellenic Football Federation) Atromitos
19	FW	François Kamano	2 May 1996 (aged 27)	46	8	(Saudi Arabian Football Federation) Abha
20	MF	Mory Konaté	15 November 1993 (aged 30)	8	0	(Royal Belgian Football Association) Mechelen
21	DF	Sekou Sylla	9 January 1999 (aged 25)	6	0	(Royal Dutch Football Association) Cambuur
22	GK	Ibrahim Koné	5 December 1989 (aged 34)	19	0	(Malta Football Association) Hibernians
23	MF	Abdoulaye Touré	3 March 1994 (aged 29)	4	0	(French Football Federation) Le Havre
24	FW	José Kanté	27 September 1990 (aged 33)	28	4	(Japan Football Association) Urawa Red Diamonds
25	FW	Facinet Conte	24 March 2005 (aged 18)	0	0	(French Football Federation) Bastia

=== Gambia ===
Gambia announced their 43-man provisional list on 20 December 2023. Despite not being officially announced yet by the Gambian football federation, the CAF published the 27-man squad on 5 January 2024.

Head coach: (Belgium) Tom Saintfiet

No.	Pos.	Player	Date of birth (age)	Caps	Goals	Club
1	GK	Modou Jobe	27 October 1988 (aged 35)	30	0	(Rwanda Football Federation) Musanze
2	MF	Hamza Barry	3 May 1994 (aged 29)	24	1	(Danish Football Association) Vejle
3	FW	Ablie Jallow	14 November 1998 (aged 25)	30	7	(French Football Federation) Metz
4	DF	Dawda Ngum	2 September 1990 (aged 33)	21	0	(Swedish Football Association) Ariana
5	DF	Omar Colley (captain)	24 October 1992 (aged 31)	47	1	(Turkish Football Federation) Beşiktaş
6	MF	Sulayman Marreh	15 January 1996 (aged 27)	35	1	Free agent
7	FW	Alieu Fadera	3 November 2001 (aged 22)	4	0	(Royal Belgian Football Association) Genk
8	MF	Ebou Adams	15 January 1996 (aged 27)	14	0	(Football Association of Wales) Cardiff City
9	FW	Assan Ceesay	17 March 1994 (aged 29)	39	13	(Saudi Arabian Football Federation) Damac
10	FW	Musa Barrow	14 November 1998 (aged 25)	34	5	(Saudi Arabian Football Federation) Al-Taawoun
11	FW	Abdoulie Sanyang	8 May 1999 (aged 24)	13	0	(French Football Federation) Grenoble
12	DF	James Gomez	14 November 2001 (aged 22)	16	1	(Football Association of the Czech Republic) Sparta Prague
13	DF	Ibou Touray	24 December 1994 (aged 29)	20	0	(The Football Association) Stockport County
14	DF	Noah Sonko Sundberg	6 June 1996 (aged 27)	17	0	(Bulgarian Football Union) Ludogorets Razgrad
15	DF	Jacob Mendy	27 December 1996 (aged 27)	1	0	(Football Association of Wales) Wrexham
16	MF	Alasana Manneh	8 April 1998 (aged 25)	10	0	(Danish Football Association) OB
17	DF	Saidy Janko	22 October 1995 (aged 28)	8	0	(Swiss Football Association) Young Boys
18	GK	Baboucarr Gaye	24 February 1998 (aged 25)	18	0	(Bulgarian Football Union) Lokomotiv Sofia
19	FW	Ebrima Colley	1 February 2000 (aged 23)	22	1	(Swiss Football Association) Young Boys
20	FW	Yankuba Minteh	22 July 2004 (aged 19)	2	1	(Royal Dutch Football Association) Feyenoord
21	DF	Muhammed Sanneh	19 February 2000 (aged 23)	9	0	(Football Association of the Czech Republic) Baník Ostrava
22	GK	Lamin Sarr	11 March 2001 (aged 22)	0	0	(Swedish Football Association) Eskilsminne
23	FW	Muhammed Badamosi	27 December 1998 (aged 25)	19	2	(Saudi Arabian Football Federation) Al-Hazem
24	MF	Ebrima Darboe	6 June 2001 (aged 22)	13	0	(Austrian Football Association) LASK
25	DF	Bubacarr Sanneh	14 November 1994 (aged 29)	38	1	(Football Association of Bosnia and Herzegovina) Zvijezda 09
26	FW	Ali Sowe	14 June 1994 (aged 29)	9	0	(Turkish Football Federation) Ankaragücü
27	MF	Yusupha Bobb	22 June 1996 (aged 27)	19	0	(Royal Moroccan Football Federation) Kawkab Marrakech

== Group D ==
=== Algeria ===
Algeria's 50-man provisional list was announced by CAF on 20 December 2023. The final squad of 26 players was announced on 29 December. On 1 January 2024, forward Amine Gouiri was released due to an injury, and goalkeeper Moustapha Zeghba was called up two days later to complete the team.

Head coach: Djamel Belmadi

No.	Pos.	Player	Date of birth (age)	Caps	Goals	Club
1	GK	Moustapha Zeghba	21 November 1990 (aged 33)	7	0	(Saudi Arabian Football Federation) Damac
2	DF	Aïssa Mandi	22 October 1991 (aged 32)	89	4	(Royal Spanish Football Federation) Villarreal
3	DF	Kevin Van Den Kerkhof	14 March 1996 (aged 27)	5	0	(French Football Federation) Metz
4	DF	Mohamed Amine Tougai	22 January 2000 (aged 23)	13	1	(Tunisian Football Federation) Espérance de Tunis
5	DF	Ahmed Touba	13 March 1998 (aged 25)	13	1	(Italian Football Federation) Lecce
6	MF	Ramiz Zerrouki	26 May 1998 (aged 25)	28	3	(Royal Dutch Football Association) Feyenoord
7	FW	Riyad Mahrez (captain)	21 February 1991 (aged 32)	90	31	(Saudi Arabian Football Federation) Al-Ahli
8	FW	Youcef Belaïli	14 March 1992 (aged 31)	50	9	(Algerian Football Federation) MC Alger
9	FW	Baghdad Bounedjah	24 November 1991 (aged 32)	63	27	(Qatar Football Association) Al-Sadd
10	MF	Sofiane Feghouli	26 December 1989 (aged 34)	81	19	(Turkish Football Federation) Fatih Karagümrük
11	MF	Houssem Aouar	30 June 1998 (aged 25)	6	2	(Italian Football Federation) Roma
12	FW	Adam Ounas	11 November 1996 (aged 27)	24	5	(French Football Federation) Lille
13	FW	Islam Slimani	18 June 1988 (aged 35)	98	45	(Brazilian Football Confederation) Coritiba
14	MF	Hicham Boudaoui	23 September 1999 (aged 24)	16	0	(French Football Federation) Nice
15	DF	Rayan Aït-Nouri	6 June 2001 (aged 22)	5	0	(The Football Association) Wolverhampton Wanderers
16	GK	Anthony Mandrea	25 December 1996 (aged 27)	11	0	(French Football Federation) Caen
17	MF	Farès Chaïbi	28 November 2002 (aged 21)	10	2	(German Football Association) Eintracht Frankfurt
18	FW	Mohamed Amoura	9 May 2000 (aged 23)	20	6	(Royal Belgian Football Association) Union Saint-Gilloise
19	MF	Nabil Bentaleb	24 November 1994 (aged 29)	45	5	(French Football Federation) Lille
20	DF	Youcef Atal	17 May 1996 (aged 27)	35	2	(French Football Federation) Nice
21	DF	Ramy Bensebaini	16 April 1995 (aged 28)	59	6	(German Football Association) Borussia Dortmund
22	MF	Ismaël Bennacer	1 December 1997 (aged 26)	47	2	(Italian Football Federation) Milan
23	GK	Raïs M'Bolhi	25 April 1986 (aged 37)	96	0	(Algerian Football Federation) CR Belouizdad
24	DF	Zineddine Belaïd	20 March 1999 (aged 24)	1	0	(Algerian Football Federation) USM Alger
25	DF	Yasser Larouci	1 January 2001 (aged 23)	2	0	(The Football Association) Sheffield United
26	GK	Oussama Benbot	11 October 1994 (aged 29)	0	0	(Algerian Football Federation) USM Alger

=== Burkina Faso ===
Burkina Faso's 54-man provisional list was announced by CAF on 20 December 2023. The final squad of 27 players was announced the same day.

Head coach: (France) Hubert Velud

No.	Pos.	Player	Date of birth (age)	Caps	Goals	Club
1	GK	Hillel Konaté	28 December 1994 (aged 29)	2	0	(French Football Federation) Châteauroux
2	FW	Djibril Ouattara	19 September 1999 (aged 24)	11	1	(Royal Moroccan Football Federation) RS Berkane
3	DF	Abdoul Guiebre	17 July 1997 (aged 26)	11	0	(Italian Football Federation) Modena
4	DF	Adamo Nagalo	22 September 2002 (aged 21)	8	0	(Danish Football Association) Nordsjælland
5	DF	Nasser Djiga	15 November 2002 (aged 21)	2	0	(Football Association of Serbia) Red Star Belgrade
6	MF	Sacha Bansé	16 March 2001 (aged 22)	0	0	(French Football Federation) Valenciennes
7	FW	Dango Ouattara	11 February 2002 (aged 21)	18	7	(The Football Association) Bournemouth
8	FW	Cedric Badolo	4 November 1998 (aged 25)	12	0	(Moldovan Football Federation) Sheriff Tiraspol
9	DF	Issa Kaboré	12 May 2001 (aged 22)	35	1	(The Football Association) Luton Town
10	FW	Bertrand Traoré (captain)	6 September 1995 (aged 28)	73	16	(The Football Association) Aston Villa
11	FW	Mamady Bangré	15 June 2001 (aged 22)	6	0	(French Football Federation) Toulouse
12	DF	Edmond Tapsoba	2 February 1999 (aged 24)	37	1	(German Football Association) Bayer Leverkusen
13	FW	Mohamed Konaté	12 December 1997 (aged 26)	21	3	(Russian Football Union) Akhmat Grozny
14	DF	Issoufou Dayo	6 August 1991 (aged 32)	71	8	(Royal Moroccan Football Federation) RS Berkane
15	FW	Abdoul Tapsoba	23 August 2001 (aged 22)	23	5	(French Football Federation) Amiens
16	GK	Hervé Koffi	16 October 1996 (aged 27)	52	0	(Royal Belgian Football Association) Charleroi
17	MF	Stephane Aziz Ki	6 March 1996 (aged 27)	11	2	(Tanzania Football Federation) Young Africans
18	MF	Ismahila Ouédraogo	5 November 1999 (aged 24)	20	0	(Hellenic Football Federation) Panserraikos
19	FW	Hassane Bandé	30 October 1998 (aged 25)	24	2	(Football Association of Finland) HJK
20	MF	Gustavo Sangaré	8 November 1996 (aged 27)	29	1	(French Football Federation) Quevilly-Rouen
21	DF	Valentin Nouma	14 February 2000 (aged 23)	5	0	(Congolese Association Football Federation) Saint-Éloi
22	MF	Blati Touré	4 August 1994 (aged 29)	42	2	(Egyptian Football Association) Pyramids
23	GK	Kilian Nikiema	22 June 2003 (aged 20)	4	0	(Royal Dutch Football Association) ADO Den Haag
24	MF	Adama Guira	24 April 1988 (aged 35)	47	0	(Royal Spanish Football Federation) Racing Rioja
25	DF	Steeve Yago	16 December 1992 (aged 31)	74	1	(Cyprus Football Association) Aris Limassol
26	MF	Dramane Salou	22 May 1998 (aged 25)	6	0	(Football Federation of Armenia) Urartu
27	GK	Sebas Koula	1 December 2004 (aged 19)	0	0	(Royal Spanish Football Federation) Sabadell

=== Mauritania ===
Mauritania's 42-man provisional list was announced by CAF on 20 December 2023. The final squad of 27 players was announced on 25 December. Goalkeeper Babacar Diop withdrew due to injury and was replaced by M'Backé N'Diaye. On 7 January 2024, midfielder Abdallahi Mahmoud withdrew due to injury and was replaced by Yassin Cheikh El Welly.

Head coach: (Comoros) Amir Abdou

No.	Pos.	Player	Date of birth (age)	Caps	Goals	Club
1	GK	Namori Diaw	30 December 1994 (aged 29)	24	0	(Football Federation of the Islamic Republic of Mauritania) Tevragh-Zeina
2	DF	Khadim Diaw	7 July 1998 (aged 25)	7	0	(Sudan Football Association) Al-Hilal
3	DF	Aly Abeid (captain)	11 December 1997 (aged 26)	58	3	(Romanian Football Federation) UTA Arad
4	MF	Omaré Gassama	1 October 1995 (aged 28)	4	0	(French Football Federation) Chateauroux
5	DF	Lamine Ba	24 August 1997 (aged 26)	7	1	(Croatian Football Federation) Varaždin
6	MF	Guessouma Fofana	17 December 1992 (aged 31)	19	0	(Cyprus Football Association) Doxa Katokopias
7	MF	El Hadji Ba	5 March 1993 (aged 30)	4	0	(Football Federation of the Islamic Republic of Mauritania) Nouadhibou
8	MF	Mouhsine Bodda	18 July 1997 (aged 26)	31	1	(Football Federation of the Islamic Republic of Mauritania) Nouadhibou
9	FW	Hemeya Tanjy	1 May 1998 (aged 25)	40	7	(Libyan Football Federation) Al-Ittihad
10	FW	Idrissa Thiam	2 September 2000 (aged 23)	23	1	(Qatar Football Association) Mesaimeer
11	FW	Souleymane Anne	5 December 1997 (aged 26)	10	1	(Royal Belgian Football Association) Deinze
12	MF	Bakari Camara	4 January 1994 (aged 30)	4	0	(French Football Federation) Villefranche
13	DF	Nouh Mohamed El Abd	24 December 2000 (aged 23)	10	1	(Football Federation of the Islamic Republic of Mauritania) Nouadhibou
14	MF	Mohamed Dellahi Yali	1 November 1997 (aged 26)	66	2	(Iraq Football Association) Al-Hudood
15	FW	Souleymane Doukara	29 September 1991 (aged 32)	8	0	(Cyprus Turkish Football Association) Mağusa Türk Gücü
16	GK	Babacar Niasse	20 December 1996 (aged 27)	14	0	(French Football Federation) Guingamp
17	MF	Yassin Cheikh El Welly	10 October 1998 (aged 25)	5	0	(Tunisian Football Federation) US Monastir
18	MF	Sidi Ahmed El Abd	5 May 2001 (aged 22)	0	0	(Football Federation of the Islamic Republic of Mauritania) Nouakchott Kings
19	FW	Aboubakary Koita	20 September 1998 (aged 25)	3	0	(Royal Belgian Football Association) Sint-Truiden
20	DF	Ibrahima Keita	8 November 2001 (aged 22)	15	0	(Congolese Association Football Federation) TP Mazembe
21	DF	Hassan Houbeib	31 October 1993 (aged 30)	19	1	(Iraq Football Association) Al-Zawraa
22	GK	M'Backé N'Diaye	19 December 1994 (aged 29)	5	0	(Football Federation of the Islamic Republic of Mauritania) Nouakchott Kings
23	FW	Sidi Bouna Amar	31 December 1998 (aged 25)	9	0	(Football Federation of the Islamic Republic of Mauritania) Nouadhibou
24	DF	Bakary N'Diaye	26 November 1998 (aged 25)	41	1	(Iraq Football Association) Al-Quwa Al-Jawiya
25	FW	Pape Ibnou Ba	5 January 1993 (aged 31)	17	2	(French Football Federation) Concarneau
26	MF	Oumar Ngom	9 March 2004 (aged 19)	0	0	(French Football Federation) Pau
27	FW	Aboubakar Kamara	7 March 1995 (aged 28)	19	8	(United Arab Emirates Football Association) Al Jazira

=== Angola ===
Angola's 55-man provisional list was announced by CAF on 20 December 2023. On 17 December, the Angolan Football Federation announced a 23-man final squad; however, the CAF then published Angola's squad with 27 players on 5 January 2024. Forward M'Bala Nzola declined the call-up due to family issues and was replaced by Gilberto on 1 January 2024.

Head coach: (Portugal) Pedro Gonçalves

No.	Pos.	Player	Date of birth (age)	Caps	Goals	Club
1	GK	Antonio Dominique	25 July 1994 (aged 29)	12	0	(Swiss Football Association) Étoile Carouge
2	DF	Núrio Fortuna	24 March 1995 (aged 28)	12	0	(Royal Belgian Football Association) Gent
3	DF	Jonathan Buatu	27 September 1993 (aged 30)	39	1	(French Football Federation) Valenciennes
4	MF	Manuel Keliano	6 January 2003 (aged 21)	5	0	(Portuguese Football Federation) Estrela Amadora
5	DF	Quinito	13 March 1998 (aged 25)	16	0	(Angolan Football Federation) Petro de Luanda
6	DF	Gaspar	27 September 1997 (aged 26)	25	1	(Portuguese Football Federation) Estrela Amadora
7	FW	Gilberto	10 March 2001 (aged 22)	9	2	(Angolan Football Federation) Petro de Luanda
8	MF	Beni Mukendi	21 May 2002 (aged 21)	2	0	(Portuguese Football Federation) Casa Pia
9	FW	Zini	3 July 2002 (aged 21)	14	4	(Hellenic Football Federation) AEK Athens
10	FW	Gelson Dala	13 July 1996 (aged 27)	34	14	(Qatar Football Association) Al-Wakrah
11	FW	Felício Milson	12 October 1999 (aged 24)	6	1	(Israel Football Association) Maccabi Tel Aviv
12	GK	Kadú	30 November 1994 (aged 29)	3	0	(Portuguese Football Federation) Oliveira Hospital
13	DF	Tó	5 November 1995 (aged 28)	32	1	(Angolan Football Federation) Petro de Luanda
14	DF	Loide Augusto	26 February 2000 (aged 23)	5	1	(Turkish Football Federation) Alanyaspor
15	FW	Zito Luvumbo	9 March 2002 (aged 21)	10	0	(Italian Football Federation) Cagliari
16	MF	Fredy (captain)	27 March 1990 (aged 33)	46	2	(Turkish Football Federation) Eyüpspor
17	MF	Bruno Paz	23 April 1998 (aged 25)	4	0	(Turkish Football Federation) Konyaspor
18	FW	Jérémie Bela	8 April 1993 (aged 30)	1	0	(French Football Federation) Clermont
19	FW	Mabululu	10 September 1989 (aged 34)	23	5	(Egyptian Football Association) Al Ittihad
20	MF	Estrela	22 September 1995 (aged 28)	13	0	(Turkish Football Federation) BB Erzurumspor
21	DF	Eddie Afonso	7 March 1994 (aged 29)	25	0	(Angolan Football Federation) Petro de Luanda
22	GK	Neblú	16 December 1993 (aged 30)	21	0	(Angolan Football Federation) 1° de Agosto
23	MF	Show	6 March 1999 (aged 24)	34	1	(Israel Football Association) Maccabi Haifa
24	GK	Gelson	8 July 1999 (aged 24)	0	0	(Angolan Football Federation) Interclube
25	DF	Inácio Miguel	12 December 1995 (aged 28)	5	0	(Angolan Football Federation) Petro de Luanda
26	FW	Depú	8 January 2000 (aged 24)	3	2	(Portuguese Football Federation) Gil Vicente
27	FW	Chico Banza	17 December 1998 (aged 25)	6	0	(Cyprus Football Association) Anorthosis Famagusta

== Group E ==
=== Tunisia ===
Tunisia's 55-man provisional list was announced by CAF on 20 December 2023. The final squad of 27 players was announced on 28 December. On 3 January 2024, Mortadha Ben Ouanes withdrew for personal reasons and was replaced by Seifeddine Jaziri.

Head coach: Jalel Kadri

No.	Pos.	Player	Date of birth (age)	Caps	Goals	Club
1	GK	Mouez Hassen	5 March 1995 (aged 28)	21	0	(Tunisian Football Federation) Club Africain
2	DF	Ali Abdi	20 December 1993 (aged 30)	22	2	(French Football Federation) Caen
3	DF	Montassar Talbi	26 May 1998 (aged 25)	36	2	(French Football Federation) Lorient
4	DF	Yassine Meriah	2 July 1993 (aged 30)	75	4	(Tunisian Football Federation) Espérance de Tunis
5	MF	Mohamed Ali Ben Romdhane	6 September 1999 (aged 24)	33	1	(Hungarian Football Federation) Ferencváros
6	MF	Houssem Tka	16 August 2000 (aged 23)	1	0	(Tunisian Football Federation) Espérance de Tunis
7	FW	Youssef Msakni (captain)	28 October 1990 (aged 33)	98	22	(Qatar Football Association) Al-Arabi
8	MF	Hamza Rafia	22 April 1999 (aged 24)	25	2	(Italian Football Federation) Lecce
9	FW	Haythem Jouini	7 May 1993 (aged 30)	9	2	(Tunisian Football Federation) Stade Tunisien
10	MF	Anis Ben Slimane	16 March 2001 (aged 22)	31	4	(The Football Association) Sheffield United
11	FW	Taha Yassine Khenissi	6 January 1992 (aged 32)	50	9	(Kuwait Football Association) Kuwait SC
12	DF	Ali Maâloul	1 January 1990 (aged 34)	88	3	(Egyptian Football Association) Al Ahly
13	DF	Hamza Jelassi	29 September 1991 (aged 32)	3	0	(Tunisian Football Federation) Étoile du Sahel
14	MF	Aïssa Laïdouni	13 December 1996 (aged 27)	39	2	(German Football Association) Union Berlin
15	DF	Oussama Haddadi	28 January 1992 (aged 31)	30	0	(German Football Association) Greuther Fürth
16	GK	Aymen Dahmen	28 January 1997 (aged 26)	15	0	(Saudi Arabian Football Federation) Al-Hazem
17	MF	Ellyes Skhiri	10 May 1995 (aged 28)	61	3	(German Football Association) Eintracht Frankfurt
18	FW	Sayfallah Ltaief	22 April 2000 (aged 23)	6	0	(Swiss Football Association) Winterthur
19	FW	Bassem Srarfi	25 June 1997 (aged 26)	16	1	(Tunisian Football Federation) Club Africain
20	DF	Yan Valery	22 February 1999 (aged 24)	7	0	(French Football Federation) Angers
21	DF	Wajdi Kechrida	5 November 1995 (aged 28)	31	0	(Hellenic Football Federation) Atromitos
22	GK	Bechir Ben Saïd	29 November 1992 (aged 31)	13	0	(Tunisian Football Federation) US Monastir
23	FW	Naïm Sliti	27 July 1992 (aged 31)	73	14	(Qatar Football Association) Al-Ahli
24	FW	Seifeddine Jaziri	12 February 1993 (aged 30)	31	10	(Egyptian Football Association) Zamalek
25	MF	Mohamed Belhadj Mahmoud	24 April 2000 (aged 23)	0	0	(Swiss Football Association) Lugano
26	DF	Alaa Ghram	24 July 2001 (aged 22)	2	0	(Tunisian Football Federation) CS Sfaxien
27	FW	Elias Achouri	10 February 1999 (aged 24)	9	0	(Danish Football Association) Copenhagen

=== Mali ===
Mali's 51-man provisional list was announced by CAF on 20 December 2023. The final squad of 27 players was announced on 2 January 2024. Massadio Haïdara withdrew due to injury and was replaced by Amadou Danté.

Head coach: Éric Chelle

No.	Pos.	Player	Date of birth (age)	Caps	Goals	Club
1	GK	Ismael Diawara	11 November 1994 (aged 29)	7	0	(Swedish Football Association) AIK
2	DF	Hamari Traoré (captain)	27 January 1992 (aged 31)	47	1	(Royal Spanish Football Federation) Real Sociedad
3	DF	Amadou Danté	7 October 2000 (aged 23)	6	0	(Austrian Football Association) Sturm Graz
4	MF	Amadou Haidara	31 January 1998 (aged 25)	35	2	(German Football Association) RB Leipzig
5	DF	Boubakar Kouyaté	15 April 1997 (aged 26)	25	0	(French Football Federation) Montpellier
6	DF	Sikou Niakaté	10 July 1999 (aged 24)	2	0	(Portuguese Football Federation) Braga
7	FW	Moussa Doumbia	15 August 1994 (aged 29)	39	5	(Saudi Arabian Football Federation) Al-Adalah
8	MF	Diadie Samassékou	11 January 1996 (aged 28)	35	1	(German Football Association) TSG Hoffenheim
9	FW	Ibrahim Sissoko	27 November 1995 (aged 28)	13	8	(French Football Federation) Saint-Étienne
10	MF	Yves Bissouma	30 August 1996 (aged 27)	30	3	(The Football Association) Tottenham Hotspur
11	MF	Lassana Coulibaly	10 April 1996 (aged 27)	33	0	(Italian Football Federation) Salernitana
12	MF	Mohamed Camara	6 January 2000 (aged 24)	18	3	(French Football Federation) Monaco
13	DF	Moussa Diarra	10 November 2000 (aged 23)	1	0	(French Football Federation) Toulouse
14	FW	Siriné Doucouré	8 April 2002 (aged 21)	0	0	(French Football Federation) Lorient
15	DF	Mamadou Fofana	21 January 1998 (aged 25)	33	1	(French Football Federation) Amiens
16	GK	Djigui Diarra	27 February 1995 (aged 28)	50	0	(Tanzania Football Federation) Young Africans
17	DF	Falaye Sacko	1 May 1995 (aged 28)	32	1	(French Football Federation) Montpellier
18	FW	Youssoufou Niakaté	16 December 1992 (aged 31)	1	1	(United Arab Emirates Football Association) Baniyas
19	FW	Fousseni Diabaté	18 October 1995 (aged 28)	1	0	(Swiss Football Association) Lausanne-Sport
20	FW	Sékou Koïta	28 November 1999 (aged 24)	23	4	(Austrian Football Association) Red Bull Salzburg
21	MF	Adama Traoré	28 June 1995 (aged 28)	34	5	(The Football Association) Hull City
22	GK	Aboubacar Doumbia	21 November 1995 (aged 28)	0	0	(Malian Football Federation) Afrique Football Élite
23	MF	Aliou Dieng	15 October 1997 (aged 26)	27	2	(Egyptian Football Association) Al Ahly
24	MF	Boubacar Traoré	20 August 2001 (aged 22)	1	0	(The Football Association) Wolverhampton Wanderers
25	FW	Lassine Sinayoko	8 December 1999 (aged 24)	10	2	(French Football Federation) Auxerre
26	MF	Kamory Doumbia	18 February 2003 (aged 20)	4	3	(French Football Federation) Brest
27	FW	Dorgeles Nene	23 December 2002 (aged 21)	5	0	(Austrian Football Association) Red Bull Salzburg

=== South Africa ===
South Africa announced their 50-man provisional list on 14 December 2023. The final squad of 23 players, plus three reserve players placed on standby (defender Tapelo Xoki, midfielder Sibongiseni Mthethwa and forward Elias Mokwana), was announced on 28 December.

Head coach: (Belgium) Hugo Broos

No.	Pos.	Player	Date of birth (age)	Caps	Goals	Club
1	GK	Ronwen Williams (captain)	21 January 1992 (aged 31)	36	0	(South African Football Association) Mamelodi Sundowns
2	DF	Nyiko Mobbie	11 September 1994 (aged 29)	22	0	(South African Football Association) Sekhukhune United
3	DF	Terrence Mashego	28 June 1996 (aged 27)	5	0	(South African Football Association) Mamelodi Sundowns
4	MF	Teboho Mokoena	24 January 1997 (aged 26)	28	4	(South African Football Association) Mamelodi Sundowns
5	DF	Siyanda Xulu	30 December 1991 (aged 32)	27	1	(South African Football Association) SuperSport United
6	DF	Aubrey Modiba	22 July 1995 (aged 28)	22	3	(South African Football Association) Mamelodi Sundowns
7	FW	Oswin Appollis	25 August 2001 (aged 22)	1	0	(South African Football Association) Polokwane City
8	MF	Jayden Adams	5 May 2001 (aged 22)	3	0	(South African Football Association) Stellenbosch
9	FW	Evidence Makgopa	5 June 2000 (aged 23)	10	3	(South African Football Association) Orlando Pirates
10	FW	Percy Tau	13 May 1994 (aged 29)	41	15	(Egyptian Football Association) Al Ahly
11	FW	Themba Zwane	3 August 1989 (aged 34)	36	7	(South African Football Association) Mamelodi Sundowns
12	MF	Thapelo Maseko	11 November 2003 (aged 20)	2	0	(South African Football Association) Mamelodi Sundowns
13	MF	Sphephelo Sithole	3 March 1999 (aged 24)	9	0	(Portuguese Football Federation) Tondela
14	DF	Mothobi Mvala	14 June 1994 (aged 29)	18	1	(South African Football Association) Mamelodi Sundowns
15	MF	Thabang Monare	16 September 1989 (aged 34)	4	0	(South African Football Association) Orlando Pirates
16	GK	Veli Mothwa	12 February 1991 (aged 32)	9	0	(South African Football Association) AmaZulu
17	FW	Zakhele Lepasa	3 January 1997 (aged 27)	11	3	(South African Football Association) Orlando Pirates
18	DF	Grant Kekana	31 October 1992 (aged 31)	8	0	(South African Football Association) Mamelodi Sundowns
19	DF	Nkosinathi Sibisi	22 September 1995 (aged 28)	8	0	(South African Football Association) Orlando Pirates
20	DF	Khuliso Mudau	26 April 1995 (aged 28)	7	1	(South African Football Association) Mamelodi Sundowns
21	FW	Mihlali Mayambela	25 August 1996 (aged 27)	10	2	(Cyprus Football Association) Aris Limassol
22	GK	Ricardo Goss	2 April 1994 (aged 29)	2	0	(South African Football Association) SuperSport United
23	MF	Thapelo Morena	6 August 1993 (aged 30)	16	0	(South African Football Association) Mamelodi Sundowns
24	DF	Tapelo Xoki	10 April 1995 (aged 28)	0	0	(South African Football Association) Orlando Pirates
25	MF	Sibongiseni Mthethwa	20 September 1994 (aged 29)	9	0	(South African Football Association) Kaizer Chiefs
26	FW	Elias Mokwana	8 September 1999 (aged 24)	0	0	(South African Football Association) Sekhukhune United

=== Namibia ===
Namibia's complete 45-man provisional list was announced by CAF on 20 December 2023. Previously, Namibia had announced a 34-man provisional list on 15 December, which was later reduced to 28 players. The final 23-player squad was announced on 4 January 2024.

Head coach: Collin Benjamin

No.	Pos.	Player	Date of birth (age)	Caps	Goals	Club
1	GK	Lloyd Kazapua	25 March 1989 (aged 34)	34	0	(South African Football Association) Chippa United
2	DF	Denzil Haoseb	25 February 1991 (aged 32)	82	0	(Namibia Football Association) Khomas Nampol
3	DF	Ananias Gebhardt	8 September 1988 (aged 35)	61	2	(South African Football Association) Baroka
4	DF	Riaan Hanamub	8 February 1995 (aged 28)	36	0	(South African Football Association) AmaZulu
5	DF	Charles Hambira	3 June 1990 (aged 33)	26	3	(Namibia Football Association) African Stars
6	MF	Ngero Katua	25 July 2001 (aged 22)	5	0	(Namibia Football Association) UNAM
7	FW	Deon Hotto	29 October 1990 (aged 33)	65	10	(South African Football Association) Orlando Pirates
8	MF	Uetuuru Kambato	24 January 1998 (aged 25)	0	0	(Namibia Football Association) African Stars
9	FW	Bethuel Muzeu	22 February 2000 (aged 23)	8	1	(South African Football Association) Black Leopards
10	MF	Prins Tjiueza	12 March 2002 (aged 21)	6	0	(Football Federation of Kosovo) Liria Prizren
11	FW	Absalom Iimbondi	11 October 1991 (aged 32)	56	7	(Namibia Football Association) Khomas Nampol
12	DF	Kennedy Amutenya	15 July 1996 (aged 27)	7	0	(Botswana Football Association) Gaborone United
13	FW	Peter Shalulile (captain)	23 March 1993 (aged 30)	49	16	(South African Football Association) Mamelodi Sundowns
14	MF	Joslin Kamatuka	27 July 1991 (aged 32)	23	3	(South African Football Association) Maritzburg United
15	MF	Marcel Papama	28 April 1996 (aged 27)	31	1	(Botswana Football Association) Jwaneng Galaxy
16	GK	Kamaijanda Ndisiro	1 December 1999 (aged 24)	3	0	(Namibia Football Association) African Stars
17	MF	Wendell Rudath	10 July 1995 (aged 28)	15	2	(Botswana Football Association) Jwaneng Galaxy
18	DF	Aprocius Petrus	9 October 1999 (aged 24)	25	0	(Football Federation of Kosovo) Liria Prizren
19	MF	Petrus Shitembi	11 May 1992 (aged 31)	71	4	(Football Association of Malaysia) Kuching City
20	DF	Ivan Kamberipa	3 February 1994 (aged 29)	26	0	(Botswana Football Association) Orapa United
21	DF	Lubeni Haukongo	24 September 2000 (aged 23)	2	0	(South African Football Association) Cape Town Spurs
22	DF	Ryan Nyambe	3 December 1997 (aged 26)	12	0	(The Football Association) Derby County
23	GK	Edward Maova	5 September 1994 (aged 29)	13	0	(South African Football Association) Pretoria Callies

== Group F ==
=== Morocco ===
Morocco's 55-man provisional list was announced by CAF on 20 December 2023. The final squad of 27 players was announced on 28 December.

Head coach: Walid Regragui

No.	Pos.	Player	Date of birth (age)	Caps	Goals	Club
1	GK	Yassine Bounou	5 April 1991 (aged 32)	58	0	(Saudi Arabian Football Federation) Al-Hilal
2	DF	Achraf Hakimi	4 November 1998 (aged 25)	68	8	(French Football Federation) Paris Saint-Germain
3	DF	Noussair Mazraoui	14 November 1997 (aged 26)	27	2	(German Football Association) Bayern Munich
4	MF	Sofyan Amrabat	21 August 1996 (aged 27)	50	0	(The Football Association) Manchester United
5	DF	Nayef Aguerd	30 March 1996 (aged 27)	34	1	(The Football Association) West Ham United
6	DF	Romain Saïss (captain)	26 March 1990 (aged 33)	79	2	(Saudi Arabian Football Federation) Al-Shabab
7	MF	Hakim Ziyech	19 March 1993 (aged 30)	55	21	(Turkish Football Federation) Galatasaray
8	MF	Azzedine Ounahi	19 April 2000 (aged 23)	21	3	(French Football Federation) Marseille
9	FW	Tarik Tissoudali	2 April 1993 (aged 30)	13	2	(Royal Belgian Football Association) Gent
10	MF	Amine Harit	18 June 1997 (aged 26)	20	1	(French Football Federation) Marseille
11	MF	Ismael Saibari	28 January 2001 (aged 22)	4	0	(Royal Dutch Football Association) PSV Eindhoven
12	GK	Munir Mohamedi	10 May 1989 (aged 34)	46	0	(Saudi Arabian Football Federation) Al-Wehda
13	DF	Yunis Abdelhamid	28 July 1987 (aged 36)	13	0	(French Football Federation) Reims
14	MF	Oussama El Azzouzi	29 May 2001 (aged 22)	1	0	(Italian Football Federation) Bologna
15	MF	Selim Amallah	15 November 1996 (aged 27)	33	4	(Royal Spanish Football Federation) Valencia
16	FW	Abde Ezzalzouli	17 December 2001 (aged 22)	11	0	(Royal Spanish Football Federation) Real Betis
17	FW	Sofiane Boufal	17 September 1993 (aged 30)	42	7	(Qatar Football Association) Al-Rayyan
18	DF	Abdel Abqar	10 March 1999 (aged 24)	0	0	(Royal Spanish Football Federation) Alavés
19	FW	Youssef En-Nesyri	1 June 1997 (aged 26)	65	17	(Royal Spanish Football Federation) Sevilla
20	FW	Ayoub El Kaabi	25 June 1993 (aged 30)	27	10	(Hellenic Football Federation) Olympiacos
21	FW	Amine Adli	10 May 2000 (aged 23)	4	1	(German Football Association) Bayer Leverkusen
22	GK	Mehdi Benabid	24 January 1998 (aged 25)	0	0	(Royal Moroccan Football Federation) AS FAR
23	MF	Bilal El Khannous	10 May 2004 (aged 19)	7	0	(Royal Belgian Football Association) Genk
24	MF	Amir Richardson	24 January 2002 (aged 21)	3	0	(French Football Federation) Reims
25	DF	Yahia Attiyat Allah	2 March 1995 (aged 28)	15	0	(Royal Moroccan Football Federation) Wydad AC
26	DF	Chadi Riad	17 July 2003 (aged 20)	0	0	(Royal Spanish Football Federation) Real Betis
27	DF	Mohamed Chibi	21 January 1993 (aged 30)	1	0	(Egyptian Football Association) Pyramids

=== DR Congo ===
DR Congo's 45-man provisional list was announced by CAF on 20 December 2023. The final squad of 24 players was announced on 27 December. Edo Kayembe withdrew due to injury and was replaced by Omenuke Mfulu.

Head coach: (France) Sébastien Desabre

No.	Pos.	Player	Date of birth (age)	Caps	Goals	Club
1	GK	Lionel Mpasi	1 August 1994 (aged 29)	8	0	(French Football Federation) Rodez
2	DF	Henoc Inonga Baka	1 November 1993 (aged 30)	9	0	(Tanzania Football Federation) Simba
4	DF	Brian Bayeye	30 June 2000 (aged 23)	1	0	(Italian Football Federation) Ascoli
5	DF	Dylan Batubinsika	15 February 1996 (aged 27)	4	0	(French Football Federation) Saint-Étienne
6	MF	Aaron Tshibola	25 January 1995 (aged 28)	7	1	(United Arab Emirates Football Association) Hatta
7	MF	Grady Diangana	19 April 1998 (aged 25)	2	0	(The Football Association) West Bromwich Albion
8	MF	Samuel Moutoussamy	12 August 1996 (aged 27)	24	0	(French Football Federation) Nantes
10	MF	Théo Bongonda	20 November 1995 (aged 28)	10	3	(Russian Football Union) Spartak Moscow
11	FW	Silas	6 October 1998 (aged 25)	6	0	(German Football Association) VfB Stuttgart
12	DF	Joris Kayembe	8 August 1994 (aged 29)	3	0	(Royal Belgian Football Association) Genk
13	FW	Meschak Elia	6 August 1997 (aged 26)	34	7	(Swiss Football Association) Young Boys
14	MF	Gaël Kakuta	21 June 1991 (aged 32)	19	3	(French Football Federation) Amiens
15	DF	Rocky Bushiri	30 November 1999 (aged 24)	1	0	(Scottish Football Association) Hibernian
16	GK	Dimitry Bertaud	6 June 1998 (aged 25)	1	0	(French Football Federation) Montpellier
17	FW	Cédric Bakambu	11 April 1991 (aged 32)	46	16	(Turkish Football Federation) Galatasaray
18	MF	Charles Pickel	15 May 1997 (aged 26)	5	0	(Italian Football Federation) Cremonese
19	FW	Fiston Mayele	24 June 1994 (aged 29)	8	2	(Egyptian Football Association) Pyramids
20	FW	Yoane Wissa	3 September 1996 (aged 27)	16	3	(The Football Association) Brentford
21	GK	Baggio Siadi	21 July 1997 (aged 26)	4	0	(Congolese Association Football Federation) TP Mazembe
22	DF	Chancel Mbemba (captain)	8 August 1994 (aged 29)	74	4	(French Football Federation) Marseille
23	FW	Simon Banza	13 August 1996 (aged 27)	3	0	(Portuguese Football Federation) Braga
24	DF	Gédéon Kalulu	29 August 1997 (aged 26)	7	0	(French Football Federation) Lorient
25	MF	Omenuke Mfulu	20 March 1994 (aged 29)	5	0	(Royal Spanish Football Federation) Las Palmas
26	DF	Arthur Masuaku	7 November 1993 (aged 30)	18	2	(Turkish Football Federation) Beşiktaş

=== Zambia ===
Zambia announced their 55-man provisional list on 13 December 2023, which was reduced to 54 players in the list announced by CAF on 20 December. The final squad of 27 players was announced on 30 December.

Head coach: (Israel) Avram Grant

No.	Pos.	Player	Date of birth (age)	Caps	Goals	Club
1	GK	Toaster Nsabata	24 November 1993 (aged 30)	37	0	(Football Association of Zambia) ZESCO United
2	DF	Zephaniah Phiri	19 November 1996 (aged 27)	2	0	(Football Association of Zambia) Prison Leopards
3	DF	Benedict Chepeshi	10 June 1996 (aged 27)	40	0	(Football Association of Zambia) Red Arrows
4	DF	Frankie Musonda	12 December 1997 (aged 26)	9	1	(Scottish Football Association) Ayr United
5	MF	Miguel Chaiwa	7 April 2004 (aged 19)	3	0	(Swiss Football Association) Young Boys
6	MF	Benson Sakala	12 September 1996 (aged 27)	35	0	(Football Association of the Czech Republic) Mladá Boleslav
7	MF	Kelvin Kampamba	24 November 1996 (aged 27)	43	6	(Football Association of Zambia) ZESCO United
8	MF	Lubambo Musonda (captain)	1 March 1995 (aged 28)	44	2	(Danish Football Association) Silkeborg
9	FW	Lameck Banda	29 January 2001 (aged 22)	8	2	(Italian Football Federation) Lecce
10	FW	Fashion Sakala	14 March 1997 (aged 26)	24	7	(Saudi Arabian Football Federation) Al-Fayha
11	MF	Larry Bwalya	29 May 1995 (aged 28)	13	1	(South African Football Association) Sekhukhune United
12	MF	Emmanuel Banda	29 September 1997 (aged 26)	20	0	(Croatian Football Federation) Rijeka
13	DF	Stoppila Sunzu	22 June 1989 (aged 34)	80	5	(Chinese Football Association) Jinan Xingzhou
14	MF	Edward Chilufya	17 September 1999 (aged 24)	8	0	(Swedish Football Association) BK Häcken
15	MF	Kelvin Kapumbu	6 April 1996 (aged 27)	28	0	(Football Association of Zambia) ZESCO United
16	GK	Lawrence Mulenga	21 August 1998 (aged 25)	9	0	(Football Association of Zambia) Power Dynamos
17	MF	Clatous Chama	18 June 1991 (aged 32)	31	5	(Tanzania Football Federation) Simba
18	GK	Francis Mwansa	14 July 2002 (aged 21)	3	0	(Football Association of Zambia) Green Buffaloes
19	MF	Fredrick Mulambia	10 July 2002 (aged 21)	1	0	(Football Association of Zambia) Power Dynamos
20	FW	Patson Daka	9 October 1998 (aged 25)	40	18	(The Football Association) Leicester City
21	DF	Dominic Chanda	26 February 1996 (aged 27)	18	1	(Football Association of Zambia) Power Dynamos
22	MF	Kings Kangwa	6 April 1999 (aged 24)	21	5	(Football Association of Serbia) Red Star Belgrade
23	DF	Rodrick Kabwe	30 November 1992 (aged 31)	40	0	(Iraq Football Association) Zakho
24	DF	Golden Mafwenta	15 January 2001 (aged 22)	2	0	(Football Association of the Czech Republic) MFK Vyškov
25	FW	Kennedy Musonda	28 December 1994 (aged 29)	2	0	(Tanzania Football Federation) Young Africans
26	DF	Tandi Mwape	20 July 1996 (aged 27)	25	1	(Congolese Association Football Federation) TP Mazembe
27	DF	Gift Mphande	19 November 2003 (aged 20)	1	0	(Israel Football Association) Hapoel Rishon LeZion

=== Tanzania ===
Tanzania announced their 53-man provisional list on 20 December 2023. The 27-man squad for the tournament was published on 3 January 2024.

Head coach: (Algeria) Adel Amrouche

No.	Pos.	Player	Date of birth (age)	Caps	Goals	Club
1	GK	Kwesi Kawawa	5 December 2001 (aged 22)	1	0	(Swedish Football Association) Karlslund
2	DF	Haji Mnoga	16 April 2002 (aged 21)	3	0	(The Football Association) Aldershot Town
3	MF	Mudathir Yahya	6 May 1996 (aged 27)	22	0	(Tanzania Football Federation) Young Africans
4	DF	Ibrahim Hamad	12 November 1997 (aged 26)	7	0	(Tanzania Football Federation) Young Africans
5	DF	Dickson Job	29 December 2000 (aged 23)	20	0	(Tanzania Football Federation) Young Africans
6	MF	Feisal Salum	11 January 1998 (aged 26)	31	2	(Tanzania Football Federation) Young Africans
7	MF	Himid Mao	15 November 1992 (aged 31)	61	2	(Egyptian Football Association) Ghazl El Mahalla
8	MF	Morice Abraham	13 August 2003 (aged 20)	1	0	(Football Association of Serbia) Spartak Subotica
9	FW	Cyprian Kachwele	15 February 2005 (aged 18)	0	0	(Canadian Soccer Association) Whitecaps FC 2
10	FW	Mbwana Samatta (captain)	23 December 1992 (aged 31)	68	22	(Hellenic Football Federation) PAOK
11	MF	Tarryn Allarakhia	17 October 1997 (aged 26)	0	0	(The Football Association) Wealdstone
12	FW	Simon Msuva	2 October 1993 (aged 30)	86	21	(Algerian Football Federation) JS Kabylie
13	GK	Beno David Kakolanya	27 June 1994 (aged 29)	1	0	(Tanzania Football Federation) Singida
14	DF	Bakari Mwamnyeto	5 October 1995 (aged 28)	26	0	(Tanzania Football Federation) Young Africans
15	DF	Mohamed Husseini	1 November 1996 (aged 27)	37	0	(Tanzania Football Federation) Simba
16	DF	Lusajo Mwaikenda	27 October 2000 (aged 23)	2	0	(Tanzania Football Federation) Azam
17	MF	Sospeter Bajana	14 October 1996 (aged 27)	1	0	(Tanzania Football Federation) Azam
18	GK	Aishi Manula	13 September 1995 (aged 28)	57	0	(Tanzania Football Federation) Simba
19	MF	Mzamiru Yassin	3 January 1996 (aged 28)	36	0	(Tanzania Football Federation) Simba
20	DF	Novatus Miroshi	2 September 2002 (aged 21)	16	2	(Ukrainian Association of Football) Shakhtar Donetsk
21	MF	Charles M'Mombwa	14 March 1998 (aged 25)	1	0	(Football Australia) Macarthur FC
22	FW	Kibu Denis	4 December 1998 (aged 25)	7	0	(Tanzania Football Federation) Simba
23	MF	Ben Starkie	23 July 2002 (aged 21)	2	0	(The Football Association) Ilkeston Town
24	DF	Abdi Banda	20 May 1995 (aged 28)	21	0	(South African Football Association) Richards Bay
25	DF	Abdulmalik Zakaria	3 March 1996 (aged 27)	0	0	(Tanzania Football Federation) Namungo
26	DF	Miano Danilo Van den Bos	31 March 2003 (aged 20)	0	0	(Royal Spanish Football Federation) Villena
27	MF	Mohammed Sagaf	12 November 1997 (aged 26)	0	0	(The Football Association) Boreham Wood
