= El Hassan Houeibib =

Mauritanian footballer (born 1993)

El Hassan Salem Houeibib
Personal information
- Date of birth: 31 October 1993 (age 33)
- Place of birth: Teyarett, Mauritania
- Height: 1.81 m (5 ft 11 1/2 in)
- Position: Centre-back

Team information
- Current team: AS FAR
- Number: 19

Senior career*
Years	Team	Apps	(Gls)
2016–2019	AS Garde		
2019–2024	Al-Zawraa SC		
2024–	AS FAR	8	(0)

International career^{‡}
2022–	Mauritania	20	(1)
- * Club domestic league appearances and goals ‡ National team caps and goals as of 20:55, 5 September 2025 (UTC)

El Hassan Salem Houeibib (born 31 October 1993) is a Mauritanian professional footballer who plays as a centre-back for Moroccan club AS FAR and the Mauritania national team.

== Club career ==
A central defender, he captained AS Garde Nationale in Mauritania prior to playing in Iraq for Al-Zawraa SC, joining the club in September 2019. He renewed his contract with the club in 2021.

He joined Moroccan club AS FAR in June 2024. He featured eight times for the club in the Botola Pro league, and five times in the African Champions League, prior to suffering a cruciate knee ligament injury in January 2025.

== International career ==
He was called-up to the Mauritania national football team by head coach Corentin Martins for the first time in 2021. He made his international debut on 3 June 2021 against Algeria.

He scored for Mauritania in a 3-0 win over Sudan in an African Nations Cup qualification match in June 2023. He was subsequently selected for the Mauritania squad for the 2023 Africa Cup of Nations in Ivory Coast.
