= Abdoulkader Thiam =

Mauritanian footballer (born 1998)

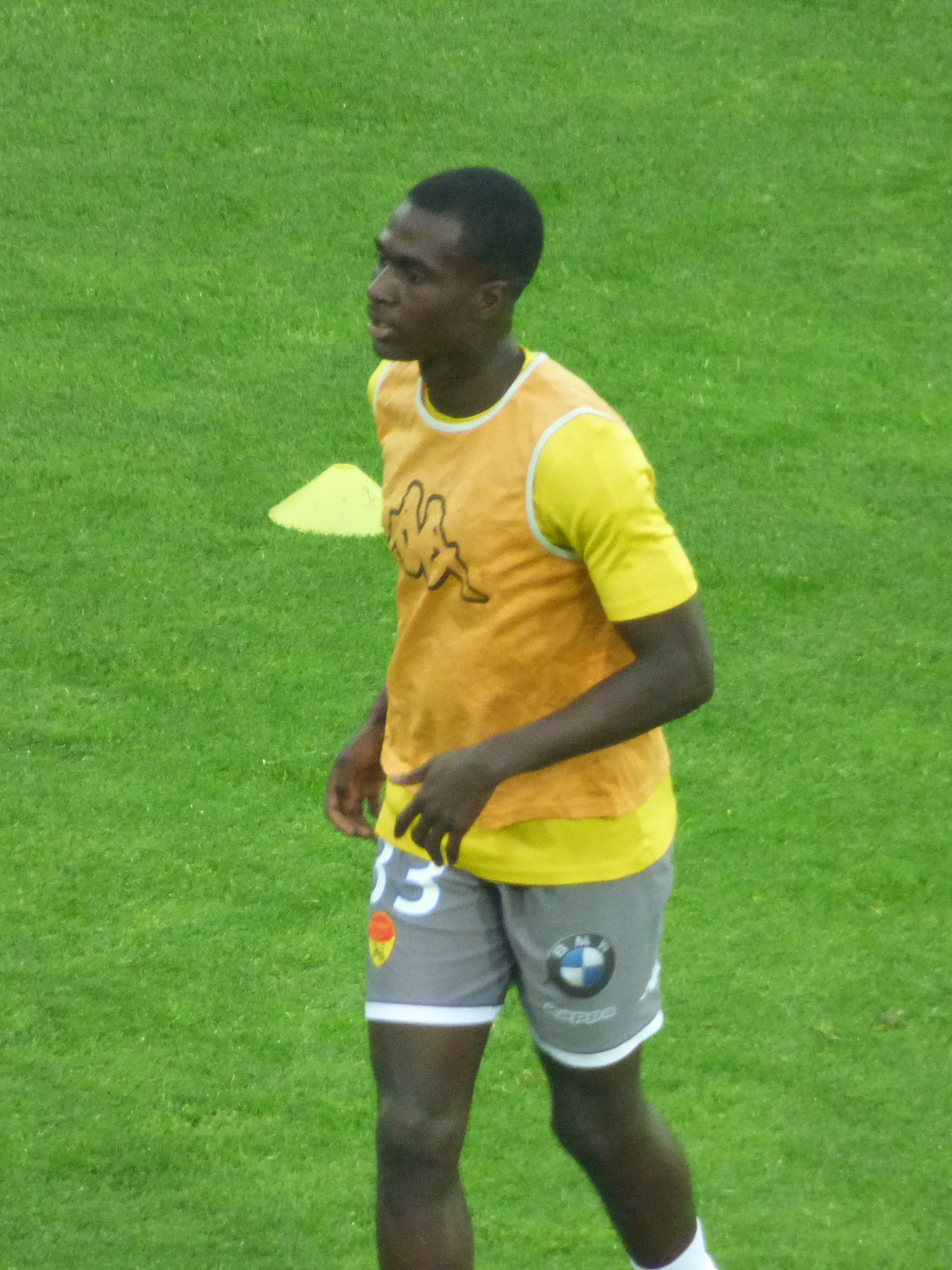
- Thiam warming-up with Orléans in 2019

Personal information
- Date of birth: 3 October 1998 (age 28)
- Place of birth: Maghama, Mauritania
- Height: 1.76 m (5 ft 9 in)
- Position: Defender

Team information
- Current team: Dinan Léhon
- Number: 28

Youth career
- 2013–2017: Monaco

Senior career*
Years	Team	Apps	(Gls)
2016–2018	Monaco B	12	(1)
2018–2020	Orléans B	17	(2)
2019–2021	Orléans	15	(0)
2021–2022	Boulogne	19	(0)
2022–2024	Cholet	45	(0)
2024–2025	St-Pryvé St-Hilaire	18	(0)
2025–	Dinan Léhon	11	(0)

International career^{‡}
2014	France U16	6	(0)
2018–	Mauritania	12	(0)
- * Club domestic league appearances and goals as of 4 December 2025 ‡ National team caps and goals as of 00:49, 23 May 2022 (UTC)

Abdoulkader Thiam (born 3 October 1998) is a Mauritanian professional footballer who plays as a defender for French Championnat National 1 club Dinan Léhon.

== Club career ==
In June 2021, Thiam joined Boulogne. In June 2022, he signed for Cholet.

== International career ==
Thiam was born in Mauritania, and emigrated to France at a young age. Previously a youth international for the France U16s, Thiam was called up to the Mauritania national team for a pair of friendlies in March 2018. On 24 March 2018, he made his debut for Mauritania in a 2–0 friendly win over Guinea.
