= Kwesi Kawawa =

Tanzanian association football player (born 2001)

Personal information
- Full name: Kwesi Zion Pira Kawawa
- Date of birth: 5 December 2001 (age 24)
- Height: 1.85 m (6 ft 1 in)
- Position: Goalkeeper

Team information
- Current team: Örebro Syrianska IF

Youth career
- –: Enskede IK
- –2021: Djurgårdens IF

Senior career*
Years	Team	Apps	(Gls)
2021	Hammarby TFF	14	(0)
2022	Örebro Syrianska IF	17	(0)
2023	Karlslunds IF	9	(0)
2024	Syrianska FC	4	(0)
2024	IFK Haninge	9	(0)
2025	Örebro Syrianska IF	7	(0)

International career^{‡}
2023-	Tanzania	3	(0)
- * Club domestic league appearances and goals as of 00:15 (UTC) 28 December 2025 ‡ National team caps and goals as of 00:15 (UTC) 1 June 2024

Kwesi Zion Pira Kawawa (born 5 December 2001) is a footballer who plays as a goalkeeper for Örebro Syrianska IF and the Tanzania national team. Born in Sweden, he represents Tanzania internationally.

== Club career ==
Kawawa has played for Hammarby TFF, Örebro Syrianska IF, Karlslunds IF, Syrianska FC, IFK Haninge, and returned to Örebro Syrianska IF in 2025.

== International career ==
He made his debut for Tanzania in November 2023 during a 2026 World Cup qualifying match against Morocco. He was included in the Tanzania squad for the 2023 Africa Cup of Nations.
