= Idrissa Thiam =

Mauritanian footballer (born 2000)

Personal information
- Full name: Idrissa Thiam
- Date of birth: 2 September 2000 (age 26)
- Place of birth: Sebkha, Mauritania
- Height: 1.77 m (5 ft 10 in)
- Position: Winger

Youth career
- ASAC Concorde

Senior career*
Years	Team	Apps	(Gls)
2017–2022	ASAC Concorde		
2019–2021	→ Cádiz B (loan)	10	(1)
2021	→ Peña Deportiva (loan)	0	(0)
2022–2023	Polvorín	24	(9)
2022–2023	Lugo	13	(0)
2023–2024	Mesaimeer	13	(10)
2024–2025	Al Kharaitiyat	14	(0)

International career^{‡}
2020–	Mauritania	36	(2)
- * Club domestic league appearances and goals as of 23 May 2024 ‡ National team caps and goals as of 5 June 2026 (UTC)

Idrissa Thiam (born 2 September 2000) is a Mauritanian professional footballer who plays as a right winger.

== Club career ==
Born in Sebkha, Thiam represented ASAC Concorde as a youth. On 2 September 2019, he moved abroad and joined Cádiz CF on loan for one year, and was initially assigned to the reserves in Segunda División B.

On 25 January 2021, Thiam's loan with Cádiz was cut short, and he signed for fellow third division side SCR Peña Deportiva on 11 February. He left the latter club in March, without debuting, after his parent club registered him back on the squad.

On 30 January 2022, Thiam signed a two-year contract with CD Lugo, and was initially assigned to the farm team.

== International career ==
In October 2020, Thiam was called up by Mauritania national team manager Corentin Martins for two friendly matches against Sierra Leone and Senegal. He made his full international debut on 9 October, coming on as a second-half substitute for Almike N'Diaye and providing the assist for Hemeya Tanjy's winning goal in a 2–1 victory over the former.

Scores and results list Mauritania goal tally first, score column indicates score after each Thiam goal

List of international goals scored by Idrissa Thiam
No.	Date	Venue	Opponent	Score	Result	Competition
1	27 September 2022	Stade El Bachir, Mohammédia, Morocco	Congo	1–0	2–0	Friendly
2	5 June 2026	Larbi Zaouli Stadium, Casablanca, Morocco	Angola	1–1	1–1	Friendly
