= Harouna Abou Demba =

Professional footballer (born 1991)

Personal information
- Full name: Harouna Abou Demba Sy
- Date of birth: 31 December 1991 (age 34)
- Place of birth: Mont-Saint-Aignan, France
- Height: 1.70 m (5 ft 7 in)
- Position: Right back

Senior career*
Years	Team	Apps	(Gls)
2009–2011	Sedan B	9	(1)
2011–2012	Reims B	14	(0)
2012–2013	Boulogne B	15	(0)
2013–2015	Boulogne	22	(1)
2015–2016	Amiens B	9	(0)
2016–2017	GS Consolat	26	(0)
2017–2021	Grenoble	53	(1)
2022–2023	Martigues	21	(0)
2024–2025	Villefranche	11	(0)

International career^{‡}
2016–	Mauritania	13	(0)
- * Club domestic league appearances and goals as of 26 May 2025 ‡ National team caps and goals as of 7 September 2021

Harouna Abou Demba Sy (born 31 December 1991) is a professional footballer who plays as a right back. Born in France, he represents Mauritania at international level.

== Club career ==
Born in Mont-Saint-Aignan, France, Sy has played for Sedan B, Reims B, Boulogne B, Boulogne, Amiens B and GS Consolat.

On 13 June 2022, Abou Demba signed with Martigues in Championnat National.

On 23 July 2024, Abou Demba moved to Villefranche.

== International career ==
He made his international debut for Mauritania in 2016.

He played for the national team at the African Cup of Nations 2019, the first international tournament of the team
