= M'Backé N'Diaye =

Mauritanian footballer (born 1994)

Personal information
- Date of birth: 19 December 1994 (age 31)
- Place of birth: Rosso, Mauritania
- Height: 1.88 m (6 ft 2 in)
- Position: Goalkeeper

Team information
- Current team: Nouakchott Kings

Senior career*
Years	Team	Apps	(Gls)
2017–	Nouakchott Kings		

International career^{‡}
2021–	Mauritania	5	(0)
- * Club domestic league appearances and goals as of 28 June 2026 ‡ National team caps and goals as of 28 June 2026

M'Backé N'Diaye (Arabic: امباكي انجباي; born 19 December 1994) is a Mauritanian footballer who plays as a goalkeeper for Super D1 side Nouakchott Kings and the Mauritania national team.

== Club career ==
Since 2017, N'Diaye has played for Nouakchott Kings.

== International career ==
N'Diaye made his debut for Mauritania on 3 December 2021, in a 1–0 defeat to the United Arab Emirates in the 2021 FIFA Arab Cup, where he was awarded the man of the match. Later that month, he was called up to Mauritania's squad for the 2021 Africa Cup of Nations, where he made one appearance as a substitute in a 2–0 defeat against Mali national football team.

In January 2023, he was called up to Mauritania's 2022 African Nations Championship squad. In December 2023, after being initially left out, he was called up for the 2023 Africa Cup of Nations to replace the injured Babacar Diop.
