= Ibrahim Mounkoro =

Malian footballer

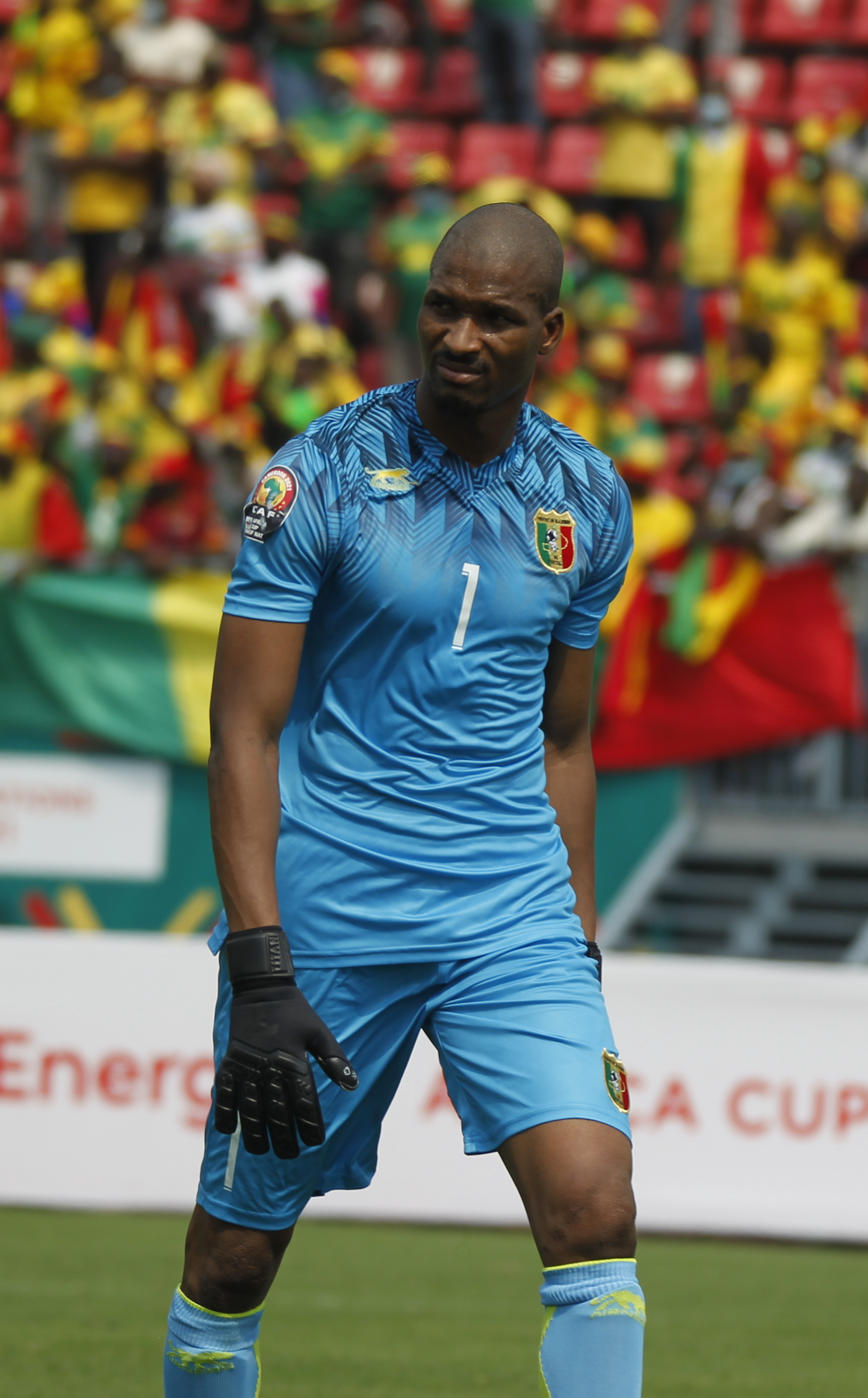
- Mounkoro with Mali at the 2021 Africa Cup of Nations

Personal information
- Full name: Ibrahim Bosso Mounkoro
- Date of birth: 23 February 1990 (age 36)
- Place of birth: Bamako, Mali
- Height: 1.90 m (6 ft 3 in)
- Position: Goalkeeper

Senior career*
Years	Team	Apps	(Gls)
2008–2011	Korofina		
2011–2014	Stade Malien		
2014–2026	TP Mazembe	87	(0)
2015-2016	→ CS Don Bosco (loan)		(0)

International career^{‡}
2019–	Mali	14	(0)
- * Club domestic league appearances and goals ‡ National team caps and goals as of 05:33, 23 June 2022 (UTC)

Ibrahim Bosso Mounkoro (born 23 February 1990) is a Malian professional footballer who plays as a goalkeeper for the Mali national team.

== Club career ==
He joined TP Mazembe on 1 January 2014 from Stade Malien and won numerous trophies including 1 CAF Confederation Cup in 2017, a Coupe du Congo in 2014, and 6 Linafoot in 2014, 2017, 2020, 2022, 2024, 2026. On 19 February 2015 he joined CS Don Bosco on loan before going back to TP Mazembe on 30 June 2016.

== International career ==
Mounkoro made his debut for Mali in a 3–2 friendly loss to Algeria on 16 June 2019. His first competitive match was a 2–1 win over Namibia in the 2021 African Cup of Nations qualifiers on 17 November 2020.

In a match against Tunisia at the 2021 Africa Cup of Nations, Mounkoro saved a penalty from Wahbi Khazri, helping Mali win the match 1–0.

== Career statistics ==
=== International ===
As of match played on 29 March 2022

Appearances and goals by national team and year
National team	Year	Apps	Goals
Mali	2019	1	0
Mali	2020	1	0
Mali	2021	6	0
Mali	2022	6	0
Total		14	0

== Honours ==
Stade Malien

- Malian Première Division: 2012–13, 2013–14
- Malian Cup: 2013

TP Mazembe

- CAF Champions League: 2015
- CAF Confederation Cup: 2016, 2017
- CAF Super Cup: 2016
- Linafoot: 2015–16, 2016–17, 2018–19, 2019–20, 2021–22, 2023–24
- DR Congo Super Cup: 2016
