= Néstor Senra =

Equatoguinean footballer (born 2002)

Personal information
- Full name: Néstor Senra Pérez
- Date of birth: 4 January 2002 (age 24)
- Place of birth: Seville, Spain
- Height: 1.78 m (5 ft 10 in)
- Position: Right back

Team information
- Current team: Recreativo
- Number: 22

Youth career
- 2009–2021: Sevilla

Senior career*
Years	Team	Apps	(Gls)
2020–2023	Sevilla C	70	(2)
2023–2024	Avilés	14	(1)
2024–2025	Antoniano	25	(0)
2025–	Recreativo	22	(1)

International career^{‡}
2021–	Equatorial Guinea	10	(0)
- * Club domestic league appearances and goals as of 7 May 2026 ‡ National team caps and goals as of 9 June 2025

Néstor Senra Pérez (born 4 January 2002) is a footballer who plays as a right back for Segunda Federación club Recreativo de Huelva. Born in Spain, he plays for the Equatorial Guinea national team.

== Early life ==
Senra was born and raised in Spain to an Equatoguinean-born Spaniard father and a Spanish mother. His paternal great-grandfather and his paternal grandfather had emigrated from Spain to Equatorial Guinea to work. His paternal grandmother was born in Equatorial Guinea, but was Spaniard as well. His father was granted dual citizenship and could also give the Equatoguinean citizenship up to five descendants, choosing him as one of them.

== Club career ==
Senra is a youth academy player of Sevilla.

On 28 June 2025, Senra was signed by Recreativo.

== International career ==
In August 2021, Senra received maiden call-up to Equatorial Guinea national team for FIFA World Cup qualification matches against Tunisia and Mauritania. He was called up to the national team for the 2023 Africa Cup of Nations.

== Career statistics ==
=== International ===
As of match played 9 January 2024

Appearances and goals by national team and year
National team	Year	Apps	Goals
Equatorial Guinea	2021	1	0
Equatorial Guinea	2022	3	0
Equatorial Guinea	2023	2	0
Equatorial Guinea	2024	1	0
Total		7	0
