= Almike N'Diaye =

Mauritianian-Spanish footballer (born 1996)

Personal information
- Full name: Almike Moussa N'Diaye
- Date of birth: 26 October 1996 (age 30)
- Place of birth: Banyoles, Spain
- Height: 1.78 m (5 ft 10 in)
- Position: Midfielder

Team information
- Current team: Cannes
- Number: 25

Youth career
- Banyoles

Senior career*
Years	Team	Apps	(Gls)
2017–2018	GOAL FC B		
2018–2021	Vaulx-en-Velin	30	(3)
2021–2022	GOAL FC	25	(2)
2022–2024	Hyères	37	(2)
2024–	Cannes	55	(0)

International career^{‡}
2020–	Mauritania	17	(0)
- * Club domestic league appearances and goals as of 16 May 2026 ‡ National team caps and goals as of 13:00, 4 January 2025 (UTC)

Almike Moussa N'Diaye (born 26 October 1996) is a professional footballer who plays as a midfielder for French Ligue 3 club Cannes. Born in Spain, he plays for the Mauritania national team.

== Career ==
As a youth player, N'Diaye joined the youth academy of Spanish club Banyoles. After that, he signed for the reserve team of French club GOAL FC. In 2018, N'Diaye signed for Championnat National 3 club Vaulx-en-Velin.
