= Modou Jobe =

Gambian footballer

Personal information
- Full name: Alagie Modou Jobe
- Date of birth: 27 October 1988 (age 38)
- Place of birth: Sanyang, The Gambia
- Height: 1.90 m (6 ft 3 in)
- Position: Goalkeeper

Team information
- Current team: Black Leopards
- Number: 13

Senior career*
Years	Team	Apps	(Gls)
2006–2014	Real de Banjul		
2014–2016	Niarry Tally		
2016–2017	Linguère		
2017–2019	El-Kanemi Warriors		
2019–2021	Jeddah		
2021–	Black Leopards	7	(0)

International career^{‡}
2007–	Gambia	27	(0)
- * Club domestic league appearances and goals as of 18:08, 11 January 2022 (UTC)) ‡ National team caps and goals as of 18:08, 11 January 2022 (UTC)

Alagie Modou Jobe (born 27 October 1988) is a Gambian professional footballer who plays as a goalkeeper for National First Division club Black Leopards and the Gambia national team.

== Club career ==
Born in Sanyang, Jobe has played club football for Real de Banjul, Niarry Tally, Linguère and El-Kanemi Warriors. He re-joined Linguère in October 2017 for pre-season training, before signing for Nigerian club El-Kanemi Warriors in November 2017. He made his debut for the club in the Nigerian Professional Football League in March 2018. In 2019, Jobe signed for Saudi club Jeddah. In 2021, he joined South African club Black Leopards.

== International career ==
Jobe made his international debut for Gambia in 2007.
