= Babacar Diop (Mauritanian footballer) =

Mauritanian footballer

Personal information
- Date of birth: 17 September 1995 (age 31)
- Place of birth: Ksar, Mauritania
- Height: 1.90 m (6 ft 3 in)
- Position: Goalkeeper

Team information
- Current team: Nouadhibou

Senior career*
Years	Team	Apps	(Gls)
2016–2018	ACS Ksar		
2018–2021	ASC Police		
2021–	Nouadhibou		

International career^{‡}
2019–	Mauritania	13	(0)
- * Club domestic league appearances and goals ‡ National team caps and goals as of 05:47, 19 August 2022 (UTC)

Babacar Diop (Arabic: بابكر ديوب; born 17 September 1995) is a Mauritanian professional footballer who plays as a goalkeeper for Super D1 club Nouadhibou and the Mauritania national team.
