= 2016 AFC U-16 Championship squads =

The 2016 AFC U-16 Championship squads are squads which participated in the 2016 AFC U-16 Championship.

== Group A ==
=== India ===
Head coach: (Germany) Nicolai Adam

No.	Pos.	Player	Date of birth (age)	Caps	Goals	Club
1	GK	Dheeraj Singh Moirangthem		3	0	
20	GK	Prabhsukhan Singh Gill		3	0	
21	GK	Mohammed Nawaz		8	0	
2	DF	Boris Singh Thangjam		11	1	
3	DF	Jitendra Singh		11	0	
4	DF	Mohammed Sharif Khan		11	0	
12	DF	Mohammed Rakib		8	0	
14	DF	Gaston D'Silva		5	1	
16	DF	Narender Singh		0	0	
5	MF	Sanjeev Stalin		9	1	
6	MF	Suresh Singh Wangjam(Captain)		11	4	
7	MF	Khumanthem Ninthoinganba Meetei		8	0	
8	MF	Amarjit Singh Kiyam		11	3	
10	MF	Komal Thatal		11	2	
11	MF	Aniket Anil Jadhav		8	0	
13	MF	Lalengmawia		1	0	
15	MF	Saurabh Meher		4	3	
17	MF	Joseph Vanlalhruaia		0	0	
9	FW	Aman Chhetri		7	2	
18	FW	Rahul Kannoly Praveen		0	0	
19	FW	Nonganba Singh Akoijam		0	0	

=== Iran ===
Head coach: Abbas Chamanyan

No.	Pos.	Player	Date of birth (age)	Caps	Goals	Club
1	GK	Meraj Esmaeili				
12	GK	Mobin Ashayer				
22	GK	Ali Gholamzadeh				
2	DF	Saeid Ahani				
3	DF	Amir Hossein Esmaeilzadeh				
5	DF	Aref Mohammadalipour				
6	DF	Taha Shariati				
13	DF	Ahmad Davasar				
18	DF	Ahmadreza Jalali				
19	DF	Saman Ranjbar				
20	DF	Mohammad Rezaei				
4	MF	Alireza Savari				
7	MF	Amir Hossein Khodamoradi				
8	MF	Mohammad Sharifi				
10	MF	Vahid Namdari				
14	FW	Mohammad Reza Ghobeishavi				
16	DF	Reza Mousavian				
17	MF	Mohammad Ghaderi				
23	MF	Mohammad Jafari				
9	FW	Alireza Asadabadi				
11	FW	Younes Delfi				
15	FW	Hossein Nokhodkar				
21	FW	Allahyar Sayyad				

=== Saudi Arabia ===
Head coach:

=== United Arab Emirates ===
Head coach:

== Group B ==
=== Australia ===
Head coach:Tony Vidmar

No.	Pos.	Player	Date of birth (age)	Caps	Goals	Club
1	GK	Nicholas Suman	28 February 2000 (age 26)	8	0	(Football Australia) Western Sydney Wanderers
2	DF	James Fletcher		3	0	(Football Australia) FFA Centre of Excellence
3	DF	Dylan Pierias	20 February 2000 (age 26)	14	3	(Football Australia) Melbourne City
4	DF	Kaleb Cox		6	0	(Football Australia) FFA Centre of Excellence
5	DF	Joel King	30 October 2000 (age 25)	17	1	(Football Australia) FFA Centre of Excellence
6	MF	Adrian Viggiani		4	0	(Football Australia) Western Sydney Wanderers
7	MF	Jacob Italiano	30 July 2001 (age 24)	13	4	(Football Australia) FFA Centre of Excellence
8	MF	Ramy Najjarine	23 April 2000 (age 26)	9	3	(Football Australia) Western Sydney Wanderers
9	FW	John Roberts	20 January 2001 (age 25)	13	17	(Football Australia) FFA Centre of Excellence
10	FW	Lachlan Brook	2 August 2001 (age 24)	16	10	(Football Australia) FFA Centre of Excellence
11	FW	Mirza Muratovic		11	8	(Football Australia) FFA Centre of Excellence
12	GK	Jordan Griffihs		3	0	(Football Australia) FFA Centre of Excellence
13	DF	Thomas Aquilina		9	0	(Football Australia) Western Sydney Wanderers
14	FW	Rahmat Akbari	20 June 2000 (age 25)	15	6	(Football Australia) FFA Centre of Excellence
15	MF	Patrick Scibilio	22 February 2000 (age 26)	7	0	(Football Australia) FFA Centre of Excellence
16	MF	Benjamin Obst		5	0	(Football Australia) FFA Centre of Excellence
17	MF	Louis D'Arrigo		9	2	(Football Australia) FFA Centre of Excellence
18	GK	Jackson Lee		1	0	(Football Australia) Perth Glory
19	FW	Mark Moric	16 March 2000 (age 26)	13	11	(Football Australia) FFA Centre of Excellence
20	FW	Bryce Bafford		6	1	(Football Australia) FFA Centre of Excellence
21	DF	Adrian Valenti	17 November 2000 (age 25)	12	1	(Football Australia) Marconi Stallions
22	MF	Jaidon Selden	12 February 2000 (age 26)	9	4	(Football Australia) FFA Centre of Excellence
23	MF	Fabian Monge		6	0	(Football Australia) Marconi Stallions

=== Japan ===
Head Coach: (Japan) Yoshiro Moriyama

#	Name	Date of Birth (Age)	Club
Goalkeepers
12	Kokoro Aoki	9 June 2000 (aged 16)	(Japan) JFA Academy Fukushima
23	Issei Ouchi	8 September 2000 (aged 16)	(Japan) Yokohama FC
1	Kosei Tani	22 November 2000 (aged 15)	(Japan) Gamba Osaka
Defenders
21	Ryutaro Sakuta	5 May 2000 (aged 16)	(Japan) Vissel Kobe
19	Kenta Kikuchi	28 May 2000 (aged 16)	(Japan) JFA Academy Fukushima
16	Takumu Kemmotsu	2 June 2000 (aged 16)	(Japan) Shimizu S-Pulse
5	Ayumu Seko	7 June 2000 (aged 16)	(Japan) Cerezo Osaka
7	Yukinari Sugawara	28 June 2000 (aged 16)	(Japan) Nagoya Grampus
3	Yuki Kobayashi	18 July 2000 (aged 16)	(Japan) Vissel Kobe
2	Rikuto Katsura	16 September 2000 (aged 15)	(Japan) Sanfrecce Hiroshima
Midfielders
4	Rei Hirakawa	20 April 2000 (aged 16)	(Japan) FC Tokyo
8	Toichi Suzuki	30 May 2000 (aged 16)	(Japan) Cerezo Osaka
10	Shimpei Fukuoka	27 June 2000 (aged 16)	(Japan) Kyoto Sanga
6	Hinata Kida	4 July 2000 (aged 16)	(Japan) Cerezo Osaka
15	Soichiro Kozuki	22 December 2000 (aged 15)	(Japan) Kyoto Sanga
17	Gijo Sehata	19 January 2001 (aged 15)	(Japan) JFA Academy Fukushima
22	Shunsuke Tanimoto	7 March 2001 (aged 15)	(Japan) Cerezo Osaka
20	Nagi Matsumoto	4 September 2001 (aged 15)	(Japan) Cerezo Osaka U-15
Forwards
18	Hiroto Yamada	7 March 2000 (aged 16)	(Japan) Cerezo Osaka
11	Taisei Miyashiro	26 May 2000 (aged 16)	(Japan) Kawasaki Frontale
14	Akito Tanahashi	12 July 2000 (aged 16)	(Japan) Yokohama F. Marinos
13	Keito Nakamura	28 July 2000 (aged 16)	(Japan) Mitsubishi Yowa SC Sugamo
9	Takefusa Kubo	4 June 2001 (aged 15)	(Japan) FC Tokyo

=== Vietnam ===
Head coach: Đinh Thế Nam

No.	Pos.	Player	Date of birth (age)	Caps	Goals	Club
1	GK	Huỳnh Hữu Tuấn				(Vietnam Football Federation) P.V.F
2	GK	Nguyễn Nhật Trường				(Vietnam Football Federation) Đồng Tháp
3	GK	Vũ Đức Minh				(Vietnam Football Federation) Viettel
4	DF	Uông Ngọc Tiến				(Vietnam Football Federation) P.V.F
5	DF	Ngô Kim Long				(Vietnam Football Federation) Hà Nội T&T
6	DF	Nguyễn Thanh Bình				(Vietnam Football Federation) Viettel
7	DF	Nguyễn Đức Long				(Vietnam Football Federation) Sông Lam Nghệ An
8	DF	Võ Văn Huy				(Vietnam Football Federation) P.V.F
9	DF	Nguyễn Huỳnh Sang				(Vietnam Football Federation) P.V.F
10	DF	Vũ Quang Độ				(Vietnam Football Federation) Viettel
11	DF	Nguyễn Xuân Kiên				(Vietnam Football Federation) Viettel
12	DF	Lê Trung Nghĩa				(Vietnam Football Federation) HAGL
13	DF	Lê Xuân Chung				(Vietnam Football Federation) Viettel
14	MF	Nguyễn Trần Việt Cường				(Vietnam Football Federation) Bình Dương
15	MF	Trần Minh Hiếu				(Vietnam Football Federation) Viettel
16	MF	Nguyễn Hữu Thắng				(Vietnam Football Federation) Viettel
17	MF	Nguyễn Trọng Long				(Vietnam Football Federation) P.V.F
18	MF	Vũ Đình Hai				(Vietnam Football Federation) Hà Nội T&T
19	MF	Mạch Ngọc Hà				(Vietnam Football Federation) Hà Nội T&T
20	MF	Nguyễn Duy Khiêm				(Vietnam Football Federation) Hà Nội T&T
21	FW	Nguyễn Khắc Khiêm				(Vietnam Football Federation) P.V.F
22	FW	Trần Văn Đạt				(Vietnam Football Federation) Hà Nội T&T
23	FW	Bùi Anh Đức				(Vietnam Football Federation) Viettel

=== Kyrgyzstan ===
Head coach:

== Group C ==
=== South Korea ===
Head coach: Seo Hyo-won

No.	Pos.	Player	Date of birth (age)	Caps	Goals	Club
1	GK	Park Ji-min	25 May 2000 (aged 16)			(Korea Football Association) Suwon Samsung U18
2	DF	Kim Tae-hwan	25 March 2000 (aged 16)			(Korea Football Association) Suwon Samsung U18
3	DF	Kim Min-hyeok	24 March 2000 (aged 16)			(Korea Football Association) Jeonnam Dragons U18
4	DF	Kim Tae-hyeon	17 September 2000 (aged 15)			(Korea Football Association) Tongjin High School
5	DF	Kim Ju-sung	12 December 2000 (aged 15)			(Korea Football Association) Osan High School
6	MF	Lee Soo-bin	7 May 2000 (aged 16)			(Korea Football Association) Pohang Steelers U18
7	MF	Park Chan-bin	21 January 2000 (aged 16)			(Korea Football Association) Jeju United U18
8	MF	Son Jae-hyeok	20 January 2000 (aged 16)			(Korea Football Association) Incheon United U18
9	FW	Park Jeong-in	7 October 2000 (aged 15)			(Korea Football Association) Ulsan Hyundai U18
10	MF	Shin Sang-whi	14 July 2000 (aged 16)			(Korea Football Association) Suwon Samsung U18
11	FW	Kim Dong-beom	20 August 2000 (aged 16)			(Korea Football Association) Pohang Steelers U18
12	DF	Jeon Woo-ram	16 May 2000 (aged 16)			(Korea Football Association) Osan High School
13	DF	Kim Jung-won	27 April 2000 (aged 16)			(Korea Football Association) Busan IPark U18
14	MF	Jeon Seung-min	15 February 2000 (aged 16)			(Korea Football Association) Singal High School
15	DF	Ko Jun-hee	28 February 2000 (aged 16)			(Korea Football Association) Boin High School
16	MF	Yu Je-ho	15 August 2000 (aged 16)			(Korea Football Association) Daejeon Citizen U18
17	MF	Kim Bo-seop	10 January 2000 (aged 16)			(Korea Football Association) Seongnam FC U18
18	FW	Cheon Seong-hoon	21 September 2000 (aged 15)			(Korea Football Association) Incheon United U18
19	MF	Kang Eui-chan	9 January 2001 (aged 15)			(Korea Football Association) Jeju United U18
20	MF	Yong Dong-hyeon	24 April 2000 (aged 16)			(Korea Football Association) Suwon Samsung U18
21	GK	Baek Jong-bum	21 January 2001 (aged 15)			(Korea Football Association) Osan High School
22	FW	Jeong Chan-young	7 December 2000 (aged 15)			(Korea Football Association) Jeonnam Dragons U18
23	GK	Min Dong-hwan	12 January 2001 (aged 15)			(Korea Football Association) Ulsan Hyundai U18

=== Malaysia ===
Head coach:

=== Oman ===
Head coach:

=== Iraq ===
Head coach: Qahtan Chathir

No.	Pos.	Player	Date of birth (age)	Club
1	GK	Ali Ibadi Jabbar		(Iraq Football Association)
2	MF	Habeeb Mohammed Khalaf		(Iraq Football Association)
3	DF	Ammar Mohammed Dheyaa Al-Lami		(Iraq Football Association)
4	DF	Ali Ahmed Radha		(Iraq Football Association)
5	DF	Muntadher Abdulsada		(Iraq Football Association)
6	MF	Muntadher Mohammed		(Iraq Football Association)
7	MF	Mohammed Dawood		(Iraq Football Association) Al-Naft
8	MF	Saif Khalid		(Iraq Football Association) Al-Zawraa SC
9	FW	Ali Kareem Hani		(Iraq Football Association)
10	FW	Mohammed Ridha		(Iraq Football Association)
11	FW	Alaa Adnan Jabbar		(Iraq Football Association)
12	GK	Mundher Najm Abed		(Iraq Football Association)
13	MF	Jawhar Haitham Abed		(Iraq Football Association)
14	DF	Yousif Suad Mones		(Iraq Football Association)
15	DF	Moamel Kareem Khachi		(Iraq Football Association)
16	FW	Dhurgham Mohammed		(Iraq Football Association)
17	FW	Mohammed Ali Abbood		(Iraq Football Association)
18	FW	Saleh Mahdi Saleh		(Iraq Football Association)
19	MF	Mohammed Abdulraheem		(Iraq Football Association)
20	MF	Ahmed Sartip		(Iraq Football Association) Erbil
21	FW	Asadullah Hamzah		(Iraq Football Association)
22	GK	Abdulazeez Ammar		(Iraq Football Association)
23	FW	Sajjad Majid Hameed		(Iraq Football Association)

== Group D ==
=== North Korea ===
Head coach:

=== Uzbekistan ===
Head coach:

=== Thailand ===
Head coach: Chaiyong Khumpiam

No.	Pos.	Player	Date of birth (age)	Caps	Goals	Club
1	GK	Wutthipong Thiangthae	20 April 2000 (aged 16)			(Football Association of Thailand) Assumption College Thonburi
2	DF	Sarawut Munjit				(Football Association of Thailand) Buriram United Academy
3	DF	Natthapong Nakpitak	24 May 2000 (aged 16)			(Football Association of Thailand) Bangkok Christian College
4	DF	Songwut Kraikruan	11 June 2001 (aged 15)			(Football Association of Thailand) Suankularb Wittayalai School
5	DF	Wudtichai Kumkeam	5 February 2000 (aged 16)			(Football Association of Thailand) Assumption College Thonburi
6	DF	Thananat Rungrampan	23 June 2000 (aged 16)			(Football Association of Thailand) Bangkok Christian College
7	MF	Pongrawit Janthawong				(Football Association of Thailand) Bangkok Glass Academy
8	MF	Prathomporn Phetcharat				(Football Association of Thailand) Muangthong United Academy
9	FW	Arnon Prasongporn				(Football Association of Thailand) Assumption College Thonburi
10	MF	Hassawat Nopnate (Captain)	17 February 2000 (aged 16)			(Football Association of Thailand) Assumption College Thonburi
11	MF	Peeranat Jantarawong	12 December 2000 (aged 15)			(Football Association of Thailand) Suphanburi Sports School
12	DF	Nititorn Sripraman				(Football Association of Thailand) Chonburi Academy
13	FW	Jinnawat Russamee	9 April 2000 (aged 16)			(Football Association of Thailand) Bangkok Christian College
14	MF	Patthadon Tiangwong				(Football Association of Thailand) Phan Thong
15	FW	Nathaphon Srisawat				(Football Association of Thailand) Debsirindra School
16	FW	Somsak Amnajrat	16 October 2000 (aged 15)			(Football Association of Thailand) Muangthong United Academy
17	MF	Peerapat Kaminthong				(Football Association of Thailand) Buriram United Academy
18	GK	Satawat Pittakij	1 February 2000 (aged 16)			(Football Association of Thailand) Assumption College Sriracha
19	MF	Sittirak Koetkhumthong	6 January 2000 (aged 16)			(Football Association of Thailand) Assumption College Thonburi
20	DF	Pichitpon Noyutai	14 January 2000 (aged 16)			(Football Association of Thailand) Debsirindra Samut Prakan School
21	MF	Rachata Moraksa				(Football Association of Thailand) Phan Thong
22	GK	Chanchol Luea-arun				(Football Association of Thailand) Assumption College Bangkok
23	DF	Sumana Salapphet	13 May 2000 (aged 16)			(Football Association of Thailand) Buriram United Academy

=== Yemen ===
Head coach:Amin AL-Sunaini
