= 2018 AFC U-19 Championship qualification =

Tournament details
- Host countries: Kyrgyzstan (Group A); Tajikistan (Group B); Qatar (Group C); Saudi Arabia (Group D); Jordan (Group E); South Korea (Group F); Cambodia (Group G); Chinese Taipei (Group H); Mongolia (Group I); Vietnam (Group J)
- Dates: 24 October – 8 November 2017
- Teams: 43 (from 1 confederation)
- Venues: 11 (in 11 host cities)

Tournament statistics
- Matches played: 66
- Goals scored: 234 (3.55 per match)
- Attendance: 113,782 (1,724 per match)
- Top scorer: (South Korea) Cho Young-wook (6 goals)

The 2018 AFC U-19 Championship qualification was an international men's under-19 football competition to decide the participating teams for the 2018 AFC U-19 Championship.

A total of 16 teams qualified to play in the final tournament, including Indonesia who qualified automatically as hosts.

== Draw ==
Of the 47 AFC member associations, a total of 43 teams entered the competition. The final tournament hosts Indonesia also entered in qualification despite having automatically qualified for the final tournament (they had not been confirmed as hosts at the time of the qualification draw).

The draw was held on 21 April 2017, 16:00 MYT (UTC+8), at the AFC House in Kuala Lumpur, Malaysia. The 43 teams were drawn into ten groups: three groups of five teams and seven groups of four teams. For the draw, teams were divided into two zones:

- West: 22 teams from West Asia, Central Asia and South Asia, to be drawn into five groups: two groups of five teams and three groups of four teams (Groups A–E).
- East: 21 teams from ASEAN and East Asia, to be drawn into five groups: one group of five teams and four groups of four teams (Groups F–J).

The teams were seeded in each zone according to their performance in the 2016 AFC U-19 Championship final tournament and qualification (overall ranking shown in parentheses; NR stands for non-ranked teams). The following restrictions were also applied:

- The eight teams which indicated their intention to serve as qualification group hosts prior to the draw were drawn into separate groups.

	Pot 1	Pot 2	Pot 3	Pot 4	Pot 5
West Zone	1. **Saudi Arabia** (2) **(H)**; 2. Iran (3) ~~**(H)**~~; 3. **Iraq** (5); 4. Bahrain (6); 5. Uzbekistan (7)	6. **Tajikistan** (8) **(H)**; 7. **United Arab Emirates** (10); 8. **Qatar** (12) **(H)**; 9. Yemen (14); 10. Palestine (17)	11. Oman (18); 12. Bangladesh (20); 13. Lebanon (21); 14. **Jordan** (22) **(H)***; 15. Turkmenistan (23)	16. Sri Lanka (24); 17. Afghanistan (26) **(W)**; 18. Nepal (32); 19. Syria (33); 20. India (34)	21. Kyrgyzstan (35) **(H)**; 22. Maldives (38)
East Zone	1. **Japan** (1); 2. **Vietnam** (4); 3. **South Korea** (9) **(H)**; 4. **Australia** (11) ~~**(H)***~~; 5. **China** (13)	6. **Thailand** (15); 7. **North Korea** (16); 8. Myanmar (19); 9. Laos (25); 10. **Malaysia** (27)	11. Timor-Leste (28); 12. Singapore (29); 13. Hong Kong (30); 14. **Chinese Taipei** (31) **(H)***; 15. Philippines (36)	16. Macau (37); 17. Brunei (39); 18. Northern Mariana Islands (40) **(W)**	19. Cambodia (NR) **(H)**; 20. **Indonesia** (NR) **(Q)**; 21. Mongolia (NR) **(H)**

Notes

- Teams in **bold** qualified for the final tournament.
- (H): Qualification group hosts (* Jordan replaced Iran as group hosts, Chinese Taipei chosen as group hosts after the draw, remaining group hosted at neutral venue, after Australia chosen as group hosts after the draw but later replaced)
- (Q): Final tournament hosts, automatically qualified regardless of qualification results
- (W): Withdrew after draw

Did not enter
West Zone	Bhutan; Kuwait (suspended); Pakistan
East Zone	Guam

== Player eligibility ==
Players born on or after 1 January 1999 are eligible to compete in the tournament.

== Format ==
In each group, teams play each other once at a centralised venue. The ten group winners and the five best runners-up qualify for the final tournament. If the final tournament hosts Indonesia win their group or are among the five best runners-up, the sixth best runner-up also qualifies for the final tournament.

=== Tiebreakers ===
Teams are ranked according to points (3 points for a win, 1 point for a draw, 0 points for a loss), and if tied on points, the following tiebreaking criteria are applied, in the order given, to determine the rankings (Regulations Article 9.3):

1. Points in head-to-head matches among tied teams;
2. Goal difference in head-to-head matches among tied teams;
3. Goals scored in head-to-head matches among tied teams;
4. If more than two teams are tied, and after applying all head-to-head criteria above, a subset of teams are still tied, all head-to-head criteria above are reapplied exclusively to this subset of teams;
5. Goal difference in all group matches;
6. Goals scored in all group matches;
7. Penalty shoot-out if only two teams are tied and they met in the last round of the group;
8. Disciplinary points (yellow card = 1 point, red card as a result of two yellow cards = 3 points, direct red card = 3 points, yellow card followed by direct red card = 4 points);
9. Drawing of lots.

== Groups ==
The matches were played between 24 October – 8 November 2017.

Schedule
Matchday	Groups A–B & F		Groups C–E & G–J			
Matchday	Dates	Matches	Dates		Matches	
Matchday	Dates	Matches	Group G	Groups C–E & H–J	Groups D–E & G–I	Groups C & J
Matchday 1	31 October 2017	3 v 2, 5 v 4	24 October 2017	4 November 2017	1 v 4, 2 v 3	3 v 1
Matchday 2	2 November 2017	4 v 1, 5 v 3	26 October 2017	6 November 2017	4 v 2, 3 v 1	2 v 3
Matchday 3	4 November 2017	1 v 5, 2 v 4	28 October 2017	8 November 2017	1 v 2, 3 v 4	1 v 2
Matchday 4	6 November 2017	2 v 5, 3 v 1	—			
Matchday 5	8 November 2017	4 v 3, 1 v 2	—			

=== Group A ===
- All matches were held in Kyrgyzstan.
- Times listed are UTC+6.

Pos	Team	Pld	W	D	L	GF	GA	GD	Pts	Qualification
1	United Arab Emirates	4	3	0	1	10	3	+7	9	Final tournament
2	Oman	4	2	1	1	10	6	+4	7	
3	Bahrain	4	2	1	1	7	3	+4	7	
4	Kyrgyzstan (H)	4	2	0	2	5	8	−3	6	
5	Nepal	4	0	0	4	0	12	−12	0	

Source: AFC
Rules for classification: Qualification tiebreakers
(H) Hosts
31 October 2017
12:00

Kyrgyzstan	2–0	Nepal
Borubaev 21'; Shukurov 90+4'	Report

Dolen Omurzakov Stadium, Bishkek
Attendance: 1,000
Referee: Shukri Al-Hunfush (Saudi Arabia)
31 October 2017
17:00

Oman	1–5	United Arab Emirates
Al-Oraimi 28'	Report	Al. Saleh 12' (pen.); Fawzi 19', 78'; Rashed 37'; Hassan 88'

Dolen Omurzakov Stadium, Bishkek
Attendance: 220
Referee: Rowan Arumughan (India)

2 November 2017
12:00

Kyrgyzstan	0–3	Oman
	Report	Al-Habsi 47'; A. Al-Alawi 72'; Al-Qaidi 82'

Dolen Omurzakov Stadium, Bishkek
Attendance: 1,200
Referee: Payam Heidari (Iran)
2 November 2017
17:00

Nepal	0–4	Bahrain
	Report	Meftah 20', 67'; Al-Khatal 86'; Shubbar 90+2'

Dolen Omurzakov Stadium, Bishkek
Attendance: 250
Referee: Kim Woo-sung (South Korea)

4 November 2017
12:00

Bahrain	1–2	Kyrgyzstan
Al-Sherooqi 90+2'	Report	Tapaev 30' (pen.); Nurbekov 55'

Dolen Omurzakov Stadium, Bishkek
Attendance: 1,050
Referee: Rowan Arumughan (India)
4 November 2017
17:00

United Arab Emirates	1–0	Nepal
Hassan 71'	Report

Dolen Omurzakov Stadium, Bishkek
Attendance: 300
Referee: Wang Di (China)

6 November 2017
12:00

United Arab Emirates	4–1	Kyrgyzstan
Kd. Al-Balochi 7', 17'; Hassan 67'; Mubarak 68'	Report	Karypbekov 43'

Dolen Omurzakov Stadium, Bishkek
Attendance: 2,000
Referee: Kim Woo-sung (South Korea)
6 November 2017
17:00

Oman	1–1	Bahrain
Al-Qaidi 82'	Report	Al-Thawadi 90+5'

Dolen Omurzakov Stadium, Bishkek
Attendance: 300
Referee: Wang Di (China)

8 November 2017
12:00

Nepal	0–5	Oman
	Report	Al-Harthi 11', 45+1'; A. Al-Alawi 32', 59'; Al-Zaabi 58'

Dolen Omurzakov Stadium, Bishkek
Attendance: 200
Referee: Payam Heidari (Iran)
8 November 2017
17:00

Bahrain	1–0	United Arab Emirates
Meftah 73'	Report

Dolen Omurzakov Stadium, Bishkek
Attendance: 200
Referee: Shukri Al-Hunfush (Saudi Arabia)

=== Group B ===
- All matches were held in Tajikistan.
- Times listed are UTC+5.

Pos	Team	Pld	W	D	L	GF	GA	GD	Pts	Qualification
1	Tajikistan (H)	4	3	1	0	12	0	+12	10	Final tournament
2	Uzbekistan	4	3	0	1	17	1	+16	9	
3	Bangladesh	4	2	1	1	5	1	+4	7	
4	Maldives	4	0	1	3	2	14	−12	1	
5	Sri Lanka	4	0	1	3	2	22	−20	1	

Source: AFC
Rules for classification: Qualification tiebreakers
(H) Hosts
31 October 2017
14:00

Maldives	2–2	Sri Lanka
Ismail 15'; Musannif 46'	Report	Razooniya 44'; Malshan 90+2'

Hisor Central Stadium, Hisor
Attendance: 150
Referee: Ahmad Yacoub Ibrahim (Jordan)
31 October 2017
17:00

Bangladesh	0–0	Tajikistan
	Report

Hisor Central Stadium, Hisor
Attendance: 1,000
Referee: Yaqoob Abdul Baqi (Oman)

2 November 2017
12:00

Sri Lanka	0–10	Uzbekistan
	Report	Abdusalomov 3', 21', 78', 89'; Izzatov 11'; Kenjabaev 18', 25'; Zokirov 63', 67'; Mozgovoy 83'

Pamir Stadium, Dushanbe
Attendance: 200
Referee: Ammar Mahfoodh (Bahrain)
2 November 2017
15:00

Maldives	0–1	Bangladesh
	Report	Sufil 90'

Pamir Stadium, Dushanbe
Attendance: 50
Referee: Dmitry Mashentsev (Kyrgyzstan)

4 November 2017
12:00

Uzbekistan	6–0	Maldives
Jumakulov 22'; Kenjabaev 38', 60'; Saitov 53'; Askarov 67'; Rakhimov 71'	Report

Pamir Stadium, Dushanbe
Attendance: 50
Referee: Yaqoob Abdul Baqi (Oman)
4 November 2017
15:00

Tajikistan	6–0	Sri Lanka
Abdulloev 31', 33' (pen.), 86'; Sharipov 75'; Yodgorov 79'; Samiev 83'	Report

Pamir Stadium, Dushanbe
Attendance: 500
Referee: Ahmad Yacoub Ibrahim (Jordan)

6 November 2017
14:00

Bangladesh	0–1	Uzbekistan
	Report	Atikuzzaman 90+4' (o.g.)

Hisor Central Stadium, Hisor
Attendance: 100
Referee: Ammar Mahfoodh (Bahrain)
6 November 2017
17:00

Tajikistan	5–0	Maldives
Mabatshoev 41', 80'; Panjshanbe 45+1'; Boboev 73'; Samiev 88'	Report

Hisor Central Stadium, Hisor
Attendance: 350
Referee: Dmitry Mashentsev (Kyrgyzstan)

8 November 2017
14:00

Sri Lanka	0–4	Bangladesh
	Report	Bishwanath 13'; Rafi 33'; Sufil 38', 45+1'

Hisor Central Stadium, Hisor
Attendance: 50
Referee: Dmitry Mashentsev (Kyrgyzstan)
8 November 2017
17:00

Uzbekistan	0–1	Tajikistan
	Report	Saitov 53' (o.g.)

Hisor Central Stadium, Hisor
Attendance: 3,500
Referee: Ammar Mahfoodh (Bahrain)

=== Group C ===
- All matches were held in Qatar.
- Times listed are UTC+3.

Pos	Team	Pld	W	D	L	GF	GA	GD	Pts	Qualification
1	Qatar (H)	2	1	1	0	3	1	+2	4 (Note: Ranked by penalties shoot-out (Qatar: 3 goals; Iraq: 2 goals).)	Final tournament
2	Iraq	2	1	1	0	3	1	+2	4	Final tournament
3	Lebanon	2	0	0	2	0	4	−4	0	
4	Afghanistan	0	0	0	0	0	0	0	0	Withdrew

Source: AFC
Rules for classification: Qualification tiebreakers
(H) Hosts
Notes:
4 November 2017
19:00

Lebanon	0–2	Iraq
	Report	Bayesh 25'; Kadhim 88'

Grand Hamad Stadium, Doha
Attendance: 50
Referee: Muhammad Nazmi Nasaruddin (Malaysia)

6 November 2017
19:00

Qatar	2–0	Lebanon
Ali 45+1', 45+3'	Report

Grand Hamad Stadium, Doha
Attendance: 2,500
Referee: Ahmed Al-Ali (Jordan)

8 November 2017
19:00

Iraq	1–1	Qatar
Dawood 61' (pen.)	Report	Murisi 45+2'
Penalties
Radha (penalty scored); Dawood (penalty scored); Abdulsada (penalty missed); Ridha Jalil (penalty missed); M. Mohammed (penalty missed)	2–3	(penalty scored) Umaru; (penalty scored) Suhail; (penalty missed) Al-Ganehi; (penalty scored) Abdulsalam

Grand Hamad Stadium, Doha
Attendance: 3,100
Referee: Aziz Asimov (Uzbekistan)

=== Group D ===
- All matches were held in Saudi Arabia.
- Times listed are UTC+3.

Pos	Team	Pld	W	D	L	GF	GA	GD	Pts	Qualification
1	Saudi Arabia (H)	3	3	0	0	8	1	+7	9	Final tournament
2	Yemen	3	1	1	1	4	2	+2	4	
3	India	3	1	1	1	3	5	−2	4	
4	Turkmenistan	3	0	0	3	0	7	−7	0	

Source: AFC
Rules for classification: Qualification tiebreakers
(H) Hosts
4 November 2017
16:05

Yemen	3–0	Turkmenistan
Al-Khadher 25'; Othman 55'; Al-Huthaifi 64'	Report

Prince Mohamed bin Fahd Stadium, Dammam
Attendance: 3,500
Referee: Omar Al-Yaqoubi (Oman)
4 November 2017
19:05

Saudi Arabia	5–0	India
Al-Hamdan 15'; Al-Buraikan 50', 81', 86'; Al-Shahrani 75'	Report

Prince Mohamed bin Fahd Stadium, Dammam
Attendance: 4,962
Referee: Mohammad Arafah (Jordan)

6 November 2017
16:05

India	0–0	Yemen
	Report

Prince Mohamed bin Fahd Stadium, Dammam
Attendance: 6,370
Referee: Hussein Abo Yehia (Lebanon)
6 November 2017
19:05

Turkmenistan	0–1	Saudi Arabia
	Report	Al-Buraikan 74'

Prince Mohamed bin Fahd Stadium, Dammam
Attendance: 4,120
Referee: Jameel Juma Abdulhusain (Bahrain)

8 November 2017
16:05

Turkmenistan	0–3	India
	Report	Singh Kiyam 74'; Halder 80'; Lalrindika 90+3'

Prince Mohamed bin Fahd Stadium, Dammam
Attendance: 3,400
Referee: Hussein Abo Yehia (Lebanon)
8 November 2017
19:05

Saudi Arabia	2–1	Yemen
Al-Ghamdi 87'; Mali 90+3'	Report	Al-Harbi 3'

Prince Mohamed bin Fahd Stadium, Dammam
Attendance: 15,214
Referee: Omar Al-Yaqoubi (Oman)

=== Group E ===
- All matches were held in Jordan; matches were due to be held in Iran, but were moved due to the Palestinian passport banning all travelers to Iran.
- Times listed are UTC+2.

Pos	Team	Pld	W	D	L	GF	GA	GD	Pts	Qualification
1	Jordan (H)	3	2	1	0	4	1	+3	7	Final tournament
2	Iran	3	1	2	0	5	1	+4	5	
3	Syria	3	1	1	1	5	5	0	4	
4	Palestine	3	0	0	3	2	9	−7	0	

Source: AFC
Rules for classification: Qualification tiebreakers
(H) Hosts
4 November 2017
15:00

Iran	1–1	Syria
Nokhodkar 79'	Report	Shalha 50'

Prince Mohammed Stadium, Zarqa
Attendance: 207
Referee: Suhaizi Shukri (Malaysia)
4 November 2017
18:00

Palestine	0–2	Jordan
	Report	Sadeh 65'; Al-Zu'bi 81'

Prince Mohammed Stadium, Zarqa
Attendance: 333
Referee: Timur Faizullin (Kyrgyzstan)

6 November 2017
15:00

Syria	3–2	Palestine
Shalha 17', 88'; Ramadan 90+4'	Report	Hammo 58'; Irshaid 84'

Prince Mohammed Stadium, Zarqa
Attendance: 50
Referee: Mahmood Al-Majarafi (Oman)
6 November 2017
18:00

Jordan	0–0	Iran
	Report

Prince Mohammed Stadium, Zarqa
Attendance: 487
Referee: Yu Ming-hsun (Chinese Taipei)

8 November 2017
15:00

Iran	4–0	Palestine
Nokhodkar 10'; Ghaderi 14'; Khodabandelou 44'; Bagheri 75'	Report

Prince Mohammed Stadium, Zarqa
Attendance: 35
Referee: Mahmood Al-Majarafi (Oman)
8 November 2017
18:00

Jordan	2–1	Syria
Al-Zu'bi 58'; Hani 73'	Report	Al-Hallak 54'

Prince Mohammed Stadium, Zarqa
Attendance: 1,127
Referee: Timur Faizullin (Kyrgyzstan)

=== Group F ===
- All matches were held in South Korea.
- Times listed are UTC+9.

Pos	Team	Pld	W	D	L	GF	GA	GD	Pts	Qualification
1	South Korea (H)	4	4	0	0	22	0	+22	12	Final tournament
2	Malaysia	4	3	0	1	8	5	+3	9	Final tournament
3	Indonesia (Note: Indonesia, as final tournament hosts, automatically qualified regardless of qualification results.)	4	2	0	2	11	8	+3	6	Final tournament
4	Timor-Leste	4	0	1	3	3	14	−11	1	
5	Brunei	4	0	1	3	2	19	−17	1	

Source: AFC
Rules for classification: Qualification tiebreakers
(H) Hosts
Notes:
31 October 2017
12:00

Timor-Leste	1–3	Malaysia
Filomeno 90+2' (pen.)	Report	Hadi 53'; Akif 68'; Zafir 77'

Paju Public Stadium, Paju
Attendance: 44
Referee: Zhang Lei (China)
31 October 2017
15:00

Indonesia	5–0	Brunei
Rafi 13'; Abdul Hariz 44' (o.g.); Iqbal 51'; Egy 56'; Saddil 61'	Report

Paju Public Stadium, Paju
Attendance: 212
Referee: Võ Minh Trí (Vietnam)

2 November 2017
12:00

Indonesia	5–0	Timor-Leste
Saddil 51'; Hanis 60'; Egy 84', 88', 90+1'	Report

Paju Public Stadium, Paju
Attendance: 71
Referee: Nivon Robesh Gamini (Sri Lanka)
2 November 2017
15:00

Brunei	0–11	South Korea
	Report	Cho Young-wook 10', 51', 61'; Kim Chan 17'; Lee Sang-jun 31', 86'; Lim Jae-hyeok 49', 88'; Lee Kang-in 73' (pen.); Jeong Ho-jin 75'; Kim Hyun-woo 90+3'

Paju Public Stadium, Paju
Attendance: 521
Referee: Mooud Bonyadifar (Iran)

4 November 2017
12:00

Malaysia	1–0	Brunei
Zafuan 76'	Report

Paju Public Stadium, Paju
Attendance: 764
Referee: Nivon Robesh Gamini (Sri Lanka)
4 November 2017
15:00

South Korea	4–0	Indonesia
Um Won-sang 9', 61'; Oh Se-hun 58'; Lee Jae-ik 77'	Report

Paju Public Stadium, Paju
Attendance: 6,448
Referee: Võ Minh Trí (Vietnam)

6 November 2017
12:00

Malaysia	4–1	Indonesia
Hadi 7' (pen.), 52' (pen.); Akhyar 34'; Pillay 47'	Report	Hanis 43'

Paju Public Stadium, Paju
Attendance: 101
Referee: Mooud Bonyadifar (Iran)
6 November 2017
15:00

Timor-Leste	0–4	South Korea
	Report	Jeon Se-jin 42'; Cho Young-wook 80', 86'; Lee Kang-in 90+3'

Paju Public Stadium, Paju
Attendance: 413
Referee: Zhang Lei (China)

8 November 2017
12:00

Brunei	2–2	Timor-Leste
Abdul Hariz 34'; Hanif 55'	Report	Danilson 13', 57' (pen.)

Paju Public Stadium, Paju
Attendance: 37
Referee: Nivon Robesh Gamini (Sri Lanka)
8 November 2017
15:00

South Korea	3–0	Malaysia
Um Won-sang 11'; Kim Jung-min 38'; Cho Young-wook 45+2' (pen.)	Report

Paju Public Stadium, Paju
Attendance: 674
Referee: Mooud Bonyadifar (Iran)

=== Group G ===
- All matches were held in Cambodia.
- Times listed are UTC+7.

Pos	Team	Pld	W	D	L	GF	GA	GD	Pts	Qualification
1	China	3	3	0	0	8	0	+8	9	Final tournament
2	Cambodia (H)	3	1	1	1	3	3	0	4	
3	Myanmar	3	1	0	2	8	4	+4	3	
4	Philippines	3	0	1	2	0	12	−12	1	

Source: AFC
Rules for classification: Qualification tiebreakers
(H) Hosts
24 October 2017
15:30

Myanmar	6–0	Philippines
Soe Moe Kyaw 9', 69'; Myat Kaung Khant 40', 82', 86'; Lwin Moe Aung 55'	Report

National Olympic Stadium, Phnom Penh
Attendance: 708
Referee: Yaqoub Al-Hammadi (United Arab Emirates)
24 October 2017
18:30

China	1–0	Cambodia
Tao Qianglong 90+2'	Report

National Olympic Stadium, Phnom Penh
Attendance: 8,355
Referee: Yudai Yamamoto (Japan)

26 October 2017
15:30

Philippines	0–6	China
	Report	Liu Ruofan 17', 41' (pen.), 45+2'; Erpan 53', 82', 85'

National Olympic Stadium, Phnom Penh
Attendance: 324
Referee: Hasan Akrami (Iran)
26 October 2017
18:30

Cambodia	3–2	Myanmar
Sin Kakada 59', 90'; San Kimheng 90+5'	Report	Hein Htet Aung 33'; Lwin Moe Aung 35'

National Olympic Stadium, Phnom Penh
Attendance: 4,955
Referee: Hanna Hattab (Syria)

28 October 2017
15:30

China	1–0	Myanmar
Liu Ruofan 38'	Report

National Olympic Stadium, Phnom Penh
Attendance: 7,350
Referee: Yaqoub Al-Hammadi (United Arab Emirates)
28 October 2017
18:30

Philippines	0–0	Cambodia
	Report

National Olympic Stadium, Phnom Penh
Attendance: 18,971
Referee: Yudai Yamamoto (Japan)

=== Group H ===
- All matches were held in Chinese Taipei.
- Times listed are UTC+8.

Pos	Team	Pld	W	D	L	GF	GA	GD	Pts	Qualification
1	Vietnam	3	3	0	0	8	1	+7	9	Final tournament
2	Chinese Taipei (H)	3	2	0	1	5	2	+3	6	Final tournament
3	Macau	3	1	0	2	1	4	−3	3	
4	Laos	3	0	0	3	0	7	−7	0	

Source: AFC
Rules for classification: Qualification tiebreakers
(H) Hosts
4 November 2017
13:00

Vietnam	2–0	Macau
Lê Minh Bình 58', 66'	Report

Hsinchu County Second Stadium, Zhubei
Attendance: 1,135
Referee: Adel Al-Naqbi (United Arab Emirates)
4 November 2017
17:00

Laos	0–2	Chinese Taipei
	Report	Fong Shao-chi 68'; Wang Chung-yu 72'

Hsinchu County Second Stadium, Zhubei
Attendance: 493
Referee: Hiroyuki Kimura (Japan)

6 November 2017
13:00

Macau	1–0	Laos
Sousa 54'	Report

Hsinchu County Second Stadium, Zhubei
Attendance: 25
Referee: Kim Dae-yong (South Korea)
6 November 2017
17:00

Chinese Taipei	1–2	Vietnam
Chin Wen-yen 57'	Report	Trương Tiến Anh 22'; Nguyễn Hồng Sơn 32'

Hsinchu County Second Stadium, Zhubei
Attendance: 1,838
Referee: Masoud Tufayelieh (Syria)

8 November 2017
13:00

Vietnam	4–0	Laos
Trần Bảo Toàn 36'; Dụng Quang Nho 38'; Nguyễn Lý Nam Cung 61'; Trương Tiến Anh 74'	Report

Hsinchu County Second Stadium, Zhubei
Attendance: 479
Referee: Hiroyuki Kimura (Japan)
8 November 2017
17:00

Chinese Taipei	2–0	Macau
Tu Shao-chieh 45' (pen.); Wang Chung-yu 77'	Report

Hsinchu County Second Stadium, Zhubei
Attendance: 206
Referee: Masoud Tufayelieh (Syria)

=== Group I ===
- All matches were held in Mongolia.
- Times listed are UTC+8.

Pos	Team	Pld	W	D	L	GF	GA	GD	Pts	Qualification
1	Japan	3	3	0	0	16	1	+15	9	Final tournament
2	Thailand	3	2	0	1	9	5	+4	6	Final tournament
3	Mongolia (H)	3	1	0	2	6	14	−8	3	
4	Singapore	3	0	0	3	3	14	−11	0	

Source: AFC
Rules for classification: Qualification tiebreakers
(H) Hosts
4 November 2017
12:00

Thailand	3–1	Singapore
Sittichok 1', 37', 90+2'	Report	Danial 56' (pen.)

MFF Football Centre, Ulaanbaatar
Attendance: 75
Referee: Bijan Heidari (Iran)
4 November 2017
16:00

Japan	7–0	Mongolia
Hara 13'; Dagvasuren 37' (o.g.); Goke 41'; Ando 46'; Erdenechimeg 51' (o.g.); Taniguchi 67'; Tanaka 86'	Report

MFF Football Centre, Ulaanbaatar
Attendance: 500
Referee: Sherzod Kasimov (Uzbekistan)

6 November 2017
12:00

Singapore	0–7	Japan
	Report	Ito 3', 23'; Nakamura 26'; Goke 32' (pen.); Tanaka 42'; Tagawa 78' (pen.); Kawamura 82'

MFF Football Centre, Ulaanbaatar
Attendance: 20
Referee: Sultan Abdulrazzaq Al-Marzooqi (United Arab Emirates)
6 November 2017
16:00

Mongolia	2–5	Thailand
Damdindorj 49'; Gerelt-Od 86'	Report	Sittichok 19', 72'; Sakunchai 44'; Kritsada 76'; Eakkanit 90+2'

MFF Football Centre, Ulaanbaatar
Attendance: 182
Referee: Nagor Amir Noor Mohamed (Malaysia)

8 November 2017
12:00

Japan	2–1	Thailand
Tagawa 62', 66'	Report	Chokanan 65'

MFF Football Centre, Ulaanbaatar
Attendance: 30
Referee: Nagor Amir Noor Mohamed (Malaysia)
8 November 2017
16:00

Singapore	2–4	Mongolia
Danial 22' (pen.); Saifullah 25'	Report	Maratkhan 40' (pen.), 53', 87'; Ganbold 90+2'

MFF Football Centre, Ulaanbaatar
Attendance: 121
Referee: Bijan Heidari (Iran)

=== Group J ===
- All matches were held in Vietnam (neutral venue host); matches were due to be held in Australia, but were moved after Australian Foreign Minister Julie Bishop refused the North Korean team entry into Australia.
- Times listed are UTC+7.

Pos	Team	Pld	W	D	L	GF	GA	GD	Pts	Qualification
1	Australia	2	2	0	0	7	1	+6	6	Final tournament
2	North Korea	2	1	0	1	6	5	+1	3	Final tournament
3	Hong Kong	2	0	0	2	1	8	−7	0	
4	Northern Mariana Islands	0	0	0	0	0	0	0	0	Withdrew

Source: AFC
Rules for classification: Qualification tiebreakers
4 November 2017
18:00

Hong Kong	0–3	Australia
	Report	Najjarine 11'; Najjar 80' (pen.), 85' (pen.)

National YFT Center, Hanoi
Attendance: 185
Referee: Takuto Okabe (Japan)

6 November 2017
18:00

North Korea	5–1	Hong Kong
Yun Min 1' (pen.); Kim Hwi-hwang 20', 35'; Kim Pom-hyok 40'; Paek Chung-song 60'	Report	Chu Wai Kwan 9' (pen.)

National YFT Center, Hanoi
Attendance: 190
Referee: Sukhbir Singh (Singapore)

8 November 2017
18:00

Australia	4–1	North Korea
Monge 19'; Najjar 26'; Najjarine 48'; Genreau 90+1'	Report	Kim Hwi-hwang 67'

National YFT Center, Hanoi
Attendance: 230
Referee: Saoud Al-Athbah (Qatar)

== Ranking of second-placed teams ==
Due to groups having different number of teams and the withdrawal of Afghanistan and Northern Mariana Islands from Groups C and J, the results against the fifth and fourth-placed teams in five and four-team groups are not considered for this ranking.

Pos	Grp	Team	Pld	W	D	L	GF	GA	GD	Pts	Qualification
1	C	Iraq	2	1	1	0	3	1	+2	4	Final tournament
2	I	Thailand	2	1	0	1	6	4	+2	3	Final tournament
3	J	North Korea	2	1	0	1	6	5	+1	3	Final tournament
4	H	Chinese Taipei	2	1	0	1	3	2	+1	3	Final tournament
5	F	Malaysia	2	1	0	1	4	4	0	3	Final tournament
6	G	Cambodia	2	1	0	1	3	3	0	3	
7	B	Uzbekistan	2	1	0	1	1	1	0	3	
8	E	Iran	2	0	2	0	1	1	0	2	
9	D	Yemen	2	0	1	1	1	2	−1	1	
10	A	Oman	2	0	1	1	2	6	−4	1	

Source: AFC
Rules for classification: 1) points; 2) goal difference; 3) goals scored; 4) disciplinary points; 5) drawing of lots.

== Qualified teams ==
The following 16 teams qualified for the final tournament.

Team	Qualified as	Qualified on	Previous appearances in AFC U-19 Championship^{1}
Indonesia	Hosts	25 July 2017	16 (1960, **1961**, 1962, 1967, 1969, 1970, 1971, 1972, 1975, 1976, 1978, 1986, 1990, 1994, 2004, 2014)
United Arab Emirates	Group A winners	6 November 2017	13 (1982, 1985, 1988, 1992, 1996, 2000, 2002, 2006, **2008**, 2010, 2012, 2014, 2016)
Tajikistan	Group B winners	8 November 2017	3 (2006, 2008, 2016)
Qatar	Group C winners	8 November 2017	13 (1980, 1986, 1988, 1990, 1992, 1994, 1996, 1998, 2002, 2004, 2012, **2014**, 2016)
Saudi Arabia	Group D winners	8 November 2017	13 (1973, 1977, 1978, 1985, **1986**, **1992**, 1998, 2002, 2006, 2008, 2010, 2012, 2016)
Jordan	Group E winners	8 November 2017	6 (1977, 1978, 2006, 2008, 2010, 2012)
South Korea	Group F winners	8 November 2017	37 (**1959**, **1960**, 1961, 1962, **1963**, 1964, 1965, 1966, 1967, 1968, 1969, 1970, 1971, 1972, 1973, 1974, 1976, 1977, **1978**, **1980**, **1982**, 1986, 1988, **1990**, 1992, 1994, **1996**, **1998**, 2000, **2002**, **2004**, 2006, 2008, 2010, **2012**, 2014, 2016)
China	Group G winners	28 October 2017	17 (1975, 1976, 1978, 1982, **1985**, 1988, 1996, 1998, 2000, 2002, 2004, 2006, 2008, 2010, 2012, 2014, 2016)
Vietnam	Group H winners	6 November 2017	18 (1961^{2}, 1962^{2}, 1963^{2}, 1964^{2}, 1965^{2}, 1967^{2}, 1968^{2}, 1969^{2}, 1970^{2}, 1971^{2}, 1974^{2}, 2002, 2004, 2006, 2010, 2012, 2014, 2016)
Japan	Group I winners	8 November 2017	36 (1959, 1960, 1961, 1962, 1963, 1964, 1965, 1966, 1967, 1968, 1969, 1970, 1971, 1972, 1973, 1974, 1975, 1976, 1977, 1978, 1980, 1988, 1990, 1992, 1994, 1996, 1998, 2000, 2002, 2004, 2006, 2008, 2010, 2012, 2014, **2016**)
Australia	Group J winners	8 November 2017	6 (2006, 2008, 2010, 2012, 2014, 2016)
Iraq	1st best runners-up	8 November 2017	16 (**1975**, 1976, **1977**, **1978**, 1982, **1988**, 1994, 1998, **2000**, 2004, 2006, 2008, 2010, 2012, 2014, 2016)
Thailand	2nd best runners-up	8 November 2017	32 (1959, 1960, 1961, **1962**, 1963, 1964, 1965, 1966, 1967, 1968, **1969**, 1970, 1971, 1972, 1973, 1974, 1976, 1980, 1985, 1992, 1994, 1996, 1998, 2000, 2002, 2004, 2006, 2008, 2010, 2012, 2014, 2016)
North Korea	3rd best runners-up	8 November 2017	12 (1975, **1976**, 1978, 1986, 1988, 1990, **2006**, 2008, **2010**, 2012, 2014, 2016)
Chinese Taipei	4th best runners-up	8 November 2017	9 (1961, 1966, 1967, 1968, 1969, 1970, 1971, 1972, 1974)
Malaysia	5th best runners-up	8 November 2017	22 (1959, 1960, 1961, 1962, 1963, 1964, 1965, 1966, 1967, 1968, 1969, 1970, 1971, 1972, 1973, 1974, 1975, 1976, 1977, 1978, 2004, 2006)

^{1} Bold indicates champions for that year. Italic indicates hosts for that year.
^{2} As South Vietnam

== Goalscorers ==
There were 234 goals scored in 66 matches, for an average of 3.55 goals per match.

6 goals

- (South Korea) Cho Young-wook

5 goals

- (Thailand) Sittichok Paso

4 goals

- (China) Liu Ruofan
- (Indonesia) Egy Maulana
- (Saudi Arabia) Firas al-Buraikan
- (Uzbekistan) Jakhongir Abdusalomov
- (Uzbekistan) Islom Kenjabaev

3 goals

- (Australia) Moudi Najjar
- (Bahrain) Ali Hassan Meftah
- (Bangladesh) Mahbubur Rahman
- (China) Erpan Ezimjan
- (Japan) Kyosuke Tagawa
- (Malaysia) Hadi Fayyadh
- (Mongolia) Jansyerik Maratkhan
- (Myanmar) Myat Kaung Khant
- (North Korea) Kim Hwi-hwang
- (Oman) Arshad Al-Alawi
- (South Korea) Um Won-sang
- (Syria) Abdulhadi Shalha
- (Tajikistan) Athamjon Abdulloev
- (United Arab Emirates) Khalfan Hassan

2 goals

- (Australia) Ramy Najjarine
- (Cambodia) Sin Kakada
- (Chinese Taipei) Wang Chung-yu
- (Indonesia) Hanis Saghara Putra
- (Indonesia) Saddil Ramdani
- (Iran) Hossein Nokhodkar
- (Japan) Hiroki Ito
- (Japan) Yuta Goke
- (Japan) Riku Tanaka
- (Jordan) Mohammad Al-Zu'bi
- (Myanmar) Lwin Moe Aung
- (Myanmar) Soe Moe Kyaw
- (Oman) Faisal Al-Harthi
- (Oman) Mohammed Al-Qaidi
- (Qatar) Hashim Ali
- (Singapore) Danial Syafiq
- (South Korea) Lee Kang-in
- (South Korea) Lee Sang-jun
- (South Korea) Lim Jae-hyeok
- (Tajikistan) Shervoni Mabatshoev
- (Tajikistan) Shahrom Samiev
- (Timor-Leste) Danilson Araujo
- (United Arab Emirates) Khalid Al-Balochi
- (United Arab Emirates) Ahmed Fawzi
- (Uzbekistan) Sanjar Zokirov
- (Vietnam) Lê Minh Bình
- (Vietnam) Trương Tiến Anh

1 goal

- (Australia) Denis Genreau
- (Australia) Fabian Monge
- (Bahrain) Ebrahim Al-Khatal
- (Bahrain) Ahmed Al-Sherooqi
- (Bahrain) Sayed Mohamed Shubbar
- (Bahrain) Mohamed Al-Thawadi
- (Brunei) Abdul Hariz Herman
- (Brunei) Hanif Adnan
- (Bangladesh) Bishwanath Ghosh
- (Bangladesh) Riyadul Hasan
- (Cambodia) San Kimheng
- (China) Tao Qianglong
- (Chinese Taipei) Chin Wen-yen
- (Chinese Taipei) Fong Shao-Chi
- (Chinese Taipei) Tu Shao-chieh
- (Hong Kong) Chu Wai Kwan
- (India) Abhishek Halder
- (India) Amarjit Singh Kiyam
- (India) Edmund Lalrindika
- (Indonesia) Muhammad Iqbal
- (Indonesia) Rafli Mursalim
- (Iran) Mohammad Bagheri
- (Iran) Alireza Ghaderi
- (Iran) Mohammad Khodabandelou
- (Iraq) Ibrahim Bayesh
- (Iraq) Ali Raad Kadhim
- (Iraq) Mohammed Dawood Yaseen
- (Japan) Mizuki Ando
- (Japan) Taichi Hara
- (Japan) Takumu Kawamura
- (Japan) Yuta Nakamura
- (Japan) Hiroto Taniguchi
- (Jordan) Ibrahim Sadeh
- (Jordan) Omar Hani
- (Kyrgyzstan) Gulzhigit Borubaev
- (Kyrgyzstan) Dastan Karypbekov
- (Kyrgyzstan) Erzhan Nurbekov
- (Kyrgyzstan) Alimardon Shukurov
- (Kyrgyzstan) Temirbolot Tapaev
- (Macau) Iury Rogério Sousa
- (Malaysia) Akhyar Rashid
- (Malaysia) Akif Syahiran
- (Malaysia) Shivan Pillay
- (Malaysia) Zafuan Azeman
- (Malaysia) Zhafir Yusoff
- (Maldives) Musannif Mohamed
- (Maldives) Rishwan Ismail
- (Mongolia) Bat-Orgil Gerelt-Od
- (Mongolia) Bilguun Damdindorj
- (Mongolia) Ganbayar Ganbold
- (Myanmar) Hein Htet Aung
- (North Korea) Kim Pom-hyok
- (North Korea) Paek Chung-song
- (North Korea) Yun Min
- (Oman) Saud Al-Habsi
- (Oman) Ahmed Jamil Al-Oraimi
- (Oman) Thamir Al-Zaabi
- (Palestine) Mohammed Hammo
- (Palestine) Ahmed Irshaid
- (Qatar) Abdullah Murisi
- (Saudi Arabia) Hamed Al-Ghamdi
- (Saudi Arabia) Abdullah Al-Hamdan
- (Saudi Arabia) Mohammed Mali
- (Saudi Arabia) Abdulaziz Al-Shahrani
- (Singapore) Saifullah Akbar
- (South Korea) Jeon Se-jin
- (South Korea) Jeong Ho-jin
- (South Korea) Kim Chan
- (South Korea) Kim Hyun-woo
- (South Korea) Kim Jung-min
- (South Korea) Lee Jae-ik
- (South Korea) Oh Se-hun
- (Sri Lanka) Shabeer Razooniya
- (Sri Lanka) Nethma Malshan
- (Syria) Mohamad Al-Hallak
- (Syria) Ammar Ramadan
- (Tajikistan) Daler Yodgorov
- (Tajikistan) Ehson Panjshanbe
- (Tajikistan) Sheriddin Boboev
- (Tajikistan) Umarjon Sharipov
- (Thailand) Chokanan Saima-in
- (Thailand) Ekanit Panya
- (Thailand) Kritsada Nontharat
- (Thailand) Sakunchai Saengthopho
- (Timor-Leste) Filomeno Junior Da Costa
- (United Arab Emirates) Ali Saleh
- (United Arab Emirates) Rashid Mubarak
- (United Arab Emirates) Majed Rashed
- (Uzbekistan) Bobur Askarov
- (Uzbekistan) Sukhrob Izzatov
- (Uzbekistan) Abbosbek Jumakulov
- (Uzbekistan) Akmal Mozgovoy
- (Uzbekistan) Jasur Rakhimov
- (Uzbekistan) Dilshod Saitov
- (Vietnam) Dụng Quang Nho
- (Vietnam) Nguyễn Hồng Sơn
- (Vietnam) Nguyễn Lý Nam Cung
- (Vietnam) Trần Bảo Toàn
- (Yemen) Saqr Al-Harbi
- (Yemen) Mohammed Al-Huthaifi
- (Yemen) Omar Al-Khader
- (Yemen) Fadi Mohammed Othman

1 own goal

- (Bangladesh) Mohamed Atikuzzaman (against Uzbekistan)
- (Brunei) Hariz Herman (against Indonesia)
- (Mongolia) Tsendjav Dagvasuren (against Japan)
- (Mongolia) Unur-Erdene Erdenechimeg (against Japan)
- (Uzbekistan) Dilshod Saitov (against Tajikistan)
