= 2016 Kazakhstan President Cup squads =

== Group A ==
=== Albania ===
Albania's 17-man squad to play in the 2016 Kazakhstan President Cup.

Coach: (Bosnia and Herzegovina) Džemal Mustedanagić

No.	Pos.	Player	Date of birth (age)	Club
1	GK	Ilia Sinani	2000 (age 16)	(Italy) Novara
2	DF	Masimiliano Doda	17 November 2000 (age 15)	(Italy) Sampdoria
3	DF	Rezart Rama	4 December 2000 (age 15)	(Greece) Olympiacos
4	MF	Roy Syla	2000 (age 16)	(England) Barnet
5	MF	Aldrit Oshafi	26 March 2000 (age 16)	(Albania) Tomori Berat
6	MF	Alessio Parisio	18 January 2000 (age 25)	(Italy) Cagliari
7	FW	Zenel Gavazaj	2 May 2000 (age 24)	(Kosovo) Liria Prizren
8	MF	Drini Halili	12 June 2000 (age 24)	(Austria) GAK
9	FW	Emiliano Bullari	2000 (age 16)	(Greece) Olympiacos
10	MF	Kristo Shehi	1 March 2000 (age 16)	(Greece) Panathinaikos
11	GK	Arlis Shala	26 July 2000 (age 16)	(Albania) Teuta Durres
12	MF	Marlon Marishta	11 June 2000 (age 16)	(Republic of Ireland) Home Farm
13	MF	Kipjon Peti	29 Jule 2000 (age 16)	(Albania) Tirana
14	MF	Dean Liço	8 February 2000 (age 16)	(Albania) Skenderbeu Korce
15	MF	Jorgo Pellumbi	15 Jule 2000 (age 16)	(Albania) Skenderbeu Korce
16	DF	Enes Isufi	14 Jule 2000 (age 16)	(Albania) Vllaznia Shkoder
17	FW	Xhelal Terziqi	26 October 2000 (age 15)	(Netherlands) Twente
18	DF	Endri Murati	3 June 2000 (age 16)	(Albania) Internacional Tirana
19	DF	Ermir Lekaj	2000 (age 16)	(Albania) Vllaznia Shkoder
20	FW	Enis Daja	2000 (age 16)	(Albania) Akademia Futbollit
21	MF	Geri Selita	2000 (age 16)	(Albania) Besa Kavaje
22	GK	Livio Malaj	25 May 2000 (age 16)	(Albania) Internacional Tirana

=== Cruzeiro-Kazakhstan ===
Coach: (Brazil) Gustavo Quintana Ribeiro

No.	Pos.	Player	Date of birth (age)	Club
1	GK	Yernar Sailauov	30 March 2000 (age 16)	
2	DF	Rustam Emirov	2000 (age 16)	
3		Konstantin Ruskov	2000 (age 16)	
4		Bekzat Bektay	2000 (age 16)	
5		Kanat Jupkaziyev	2000 (age 16)	
6		Ravil Ibragimov	2000 (age 16)	
7		Nurbol Nurbergen	2000 (age 16)	
9		Damir Zhanbayev	2000 (age 16)	
10		Dmitry Bachek	2000 (age 16)	
11		Dinmukhamed Karaman	2000 (age 16)	
16		Abzal Orazbayev	2000 (age 16)	
	GK	Alikhan Imanov	2000 (age 16)	
	DF	Zakhriddin Saydamatov	2000 (age 16)	
	MF	Agadil Kultas	2000 (age 16)	
	MF	Adil Baygazin	2000 (age 16)	
		Olzhas Amangeldiyev	2000 (age 16)	
		Daryn Kainolla	2000 (age 16)	
	MF	Nurbol Nurbergen	2000 (age 16)	

=== Kazakhstan ===
Kazakhstan 17 man squad to play in the 2016 Kazakhstan President Cup.

Coach: (Kazakhstan) Aleksandr Kuznetsov

No.	Pos.	Player	Date of birth (age)	Club
	GK	Danil Ustimenko	30 November 1999 (age 25)	(Kazakhstan) Kairat
	GK	Oleg Medvedev	21 March 2000 (age 24)	(Kazakhstan) Astana
	GK	Vladislav Saenko	4 June 2000 (age 24)	(Kazakhstan) Astana
	DF	Sanzhar Aytym	2 March 2000 (age 25)	(Kazakhstan) Astana
	DF	Alim Ilyasov	22 June 2000 (age 24)	(Kazakhstan) Astana
	DF	Dinmukhamed Kashken	4 January 2000 (age 25)	(Kazakhstan) Astana
	DF	Nurali Mamyrbayev	15 February 2000 (age 25)	(Kazakhstan) Ordabady
	DF	Ivan Sizov	30 November 1999 (age 25)	(Kazakhstan) CSKA Almaty
	DF	Sagi Sovet	15 March 2000 (age 25)	(Kazakhstan) Astana
	DF	Beksultan Shamshi	30 November 1999 (age 25)	(Kazakhstan) Ordabasy
	MF	Madi Zhakipbayev	21 March 2000 (age 24)	(Kazakhstan) Astana
	MF	Zhasulan Kayrkenov	27 March 2000 (age 24)	(Kazakhstan) Astana
	MF	Arman Kenesov	4 September 2000 (age 24)	(Kazakhstan) Irtysh
	MF	Ruslan Makhan	7 January 2000 (age 25)	(Kazakhstan) Kairat
	MF	Sultan Sagnayev	14 January 2000 (age 25)	(Kazakhstan) Astana
	MF	Amal Seitov	30 November 1999 (age 25)	(Kazakhstan) Astana
	MF	Andrei Ulshin	30 November 1999 (age 25)	(Kazakhstan) Astana
	FW	Mark Kim	30 November 1999 (age 25)	(Kazakhstan) Enbek
	FW	Denis Krasnoperov	17 February 1999 (age 26)	(Kazakhstan) Irtysh
	FW	Yerkebulan Seidakhmet	30 November 1999 (age 25)	(Kazakhstan) Montazhnik
	FW	Lev Skvortsov	2 February 2000 (age 25)	(Kazakhstan) Astana

=== Kyrgyzstan ===
Kyrgyzstan 16 man squad to play in the 2016 Kazakhstan President Cup.

Coach: (Kyrgyzstan) Samat Suymaliev

No.	Pos.	Player	Date of birth (age)	Club
1	GK	Elgard Sychev	8 January 2000 (age 25)	(Kyrgyzstan) Zhivoe Pivo
2	DF	Malik Aytbayev	22 May 2000 (age 24)	(Kyrgyzstan) Abdish-Ata
3	DF	Amantur Shamurzaev	25 January 2000 (age 25)	(Kyrgyzstan) Dordoi
4	DF	Maksat Zhakybaliyev	18 February 2000 (age 25)	(Kyrgyzstan) RSDYUSHOR
5	MF	Arlen Sharshenbekov	30 November 1999 (age 25)	(Kyrgyzstan) Dordoi
6	DF	Zhenishbek Sydykov	9 May 2000 (age 24)	(Kyrgyzstan) Abdish-Ata
7	FW	Ryskeldi Artykbayev	2000 (age 16)	(Kyrgyzstan) Dordoi
8	MF	Emir Shigaybayev	21 August 2000 (age 24)	(Kyrgyzstan) Abdish-Ata Kant
9	MF	Azamat Melisbekov	2000 (age 16)	(Kyrgyzstan) RSDYUSHOR
10	MF	Maksim Yesin	2000 (age 16)	(Kyrgyzstan) RSDYUSHOR
11	MF	Orozbek Timur uulu	2000 (age 16)	(Kyrgyzstan) Dordoi
12	GK	Erzhan Tokotayev	17 July 2000 (age 24)	(Kyrgyzstan) Dordoi
13	FW	Syrgabolat Orozbek uulu	22 March 2000 (age 24)	(Kyrgyzstan) Abdish-Ata
14	FW	Ernaz Almaz uulu	2000 (age 16)	(Kyrgyzstan) RSDYUSHOR
15	FW	Gulzhigit Borubayev	22 April 2000 (age 24)	(Kyrgyzstan) Dordoi Bishkek
16	MF	Zhenishbek Mamatemin uulu	9 May 2000 (age 24)	(Kyrgyzstan) Aldiyer
17	FW	Gulzhigit Alikulov	25 November 2000 (age 24)	(Kyrgyzstan) Dordoi
18	FW	Aziret Momoshev	25 November 2000 (age 24)	(Kyrgyzstan) Dordoi
	GK	Vadim Krokha	2000 (age 16)	(Kyrgyzstan) RSDYUSHOR
	GK	Artyom Pryadkin	2000 (age 16)	(Kyrgyzstan) RSDYUSHOR
	DF	Zhakyp Aliyev	2000 (age 16)	(Kyrgyzstan) Abdish-Ata
	DF	Maksat Alygulov	2000 (age 16)	(Kyrgyzstan) Manas-Ordo
	DF	Bakyt Toktomazhinov	2000 (age 16)	(Kyrgyzstan) Dordoi
	DF	Argen Namatbekov	2000 (age 16)	(Kyrgyzstan) Dordoi

== Group B ==
=== Azerbaijan ===
Azerbaijan's 17-man squad to play in the 2016 Kazakhstan President Cup.

Coach: (Azerbaijan) Tabriz Hasanov

No.	Pos.	Player	Date of birth (age)	Club
1	GK	Nijat Mehbaliyev	11 September 2000 (age 24)	(Azerbaijan) Inter Baku
2	DF	Samir Orujlu	7 January 2001 (age 24)	(Azerbaijan) Inter Baku
3	DF	Bashir Ayralov	10 September 2000 (age 24)	(Azerbaijan) Neftchi
4	DF	Elton Alibayli	4 February 2000 (age 25)	(Azerbaijan) Neftchi
5	DF	Zahid Mardanov	9 August 2000 (age 24)	(Azerbaijan) Vatan
6	FW	Khagani Sadikhov	10 April 2000 (age 24)	(Azerbaijan) Khazar Lankaran
7	FW	Kamran Guliyev	11 March 2000 (age 25)	(Azerbaijan) Gabala
8	FW	Muhammad Maharramov	1 August 2001 (age 23)	(Azerbaijan) Gabala
10	MF	Farid Mahmudov	22 August 2000 (age 24)	(Azerbaijan) Neftchi
11	MF	Turan Valizada	1 January 2001 (age 24)	(Turkey) Fenerbahce
15	MF	Shakir Seyidov	31 December 2000 (age 24)	(Azerbaijan) Vatan
17	DF	Marat Azizov	9 June 2000 (age 24)	(Azerbaijan) Vatan
18	MF	Samir Gurbanov	12 March 2001 (age 24)	(Azerbaijan) Gabala
19	DF	Izzat Mushtagov	11 July 2000 (age 24)	(Azerbaijan) Gabala

=== Azerbaijan-Cruzeiro ===
AC's 3-man squad to play in the 2016 Kazakhstan Cup.

Coach: (Azerbaijan) Vusal Mustafayev

No.	Pos.	Player	Date of birth (age)	Club
22	MF	Vusal Mustafayev (player-coach)	12 January 2000 (age 25)	(Azerbaijan) Gabala
		Muhammet Can Tuncer	16 January 2000 (age 25)	(Turkey) Altinordu
		Muhammad Abbasli	2000 (age 16)	(Azerbaijan) Gabala
		Emir Rzayev	2000 (age 16)	(Azerbaijan) Sumgayit

=== Iran ===
Iran's 16-man squad to play in the 2016 Kazakhstan President Cup.

Coach: (Iran) Abas Chamanian

No.	Pos.	Player	Date of birth (age)	Club
1	GK	Meraj Esmaeili	13 January 2000 (age 25)	
2	MF	Saeid Ahani	8 February 2001 (age 24)	
3	DF	Amir Hossein Esmailzadeh	7 February 2000 (age 25)	
5	DF	Aref Mohammadaliour	2 February 2001 (age 24)	
6	DF	Taha Shariati	3 March 2000 (age 25)	
7	MF	Mohsen Goodarzi	8 June 2000 (age 24)	
8	MF	Mohammad Sharifi	21 March 2000 (age 24)	(Iran) Esteghlal Khuzestan
9	MF	Amir Khodamoradi	2000 (age 16)	
10	MF	Vahid Namdari	27 July 2000 (age 24)	
11	MF	Amir Hosseinpour	24 January 2000 (age 25)	
14		Ahmad Reza Jalili	14 August 2001 (age 23)	
15		Amir Reza Haydari	2000 (age 16)	
16		Ali Reza Asadabadi	23 July 2002 (age 22)	
17	MF	Mohammad Ghaderi	27 February 2000 (age 25)	
19		Yones Delfi	2000 (age 16)	
20		Hossein Nokhatkhar	24 February 2002 (age 23)	
	GK	Mobin Ashayer	2000 (age 16)	

=== Russia-2 ===
Russia's 17-man squad to play in the 2016 Kazakhstan President Cup.

Coach: (Russia) David Khmelidze

RFU has declared that it didn't send any national teams to this tournament. Under the guise of the national team on a tournament one of teams of Krasnodar Krai participated. Officially the structure of the national team on a tournament hasn't been announced.

=== Tajikistan ===
Tajikistan 16 man squad to play in the 2016 Kazakhstan President Cup.

Coach: (Tajikistan) Zayniddin Rahimov

No.	Pos.	Player	Date of birth (age)	Club
2	DF	Sultonsho Mirzoev	4 September 2000 (age 24)	(Tajikistan) CSKA Pomir
3	DF	Vahdat Hanonov	27 May 2000 (age 24)	(Tajikistan) Barkchi
4	DF	Khuvaylo Maliev	5 October 2000 (age 24)	(Tajikistan) Barkchi
5	DF	Amir Ibragimov	15 March 2000 (age 25)	(Tajikistan) Khujand
6	MF	Khurshed Abdulloev	2000 (age 16)	(Belarus) Dinamo Minsk
8	MF	Saidmuhtor Azimov	9 June 2000 (age 24)	(Tajikistan) CSKA Pomir
9	MF	Shervoni Mabatshoev	4 December 2000 (age 24)	(Tajikistan) CSKA Pomir
10	MF	Shahzod Davlatov	2000 (age 16)	(Tajikistan) CSKA Pomir
11	FW	Daler Edgorov	2000 (age 16)	(Tajikistan) Barkchi
13	FW	Avaz Kamchinov	6 July 2000 (age 24)	(Tajikistan) Ravshan
14	FW	Tohir Malodustov	2000 (age 16)	(Tajikistan) CSKA Pomir
15	DF	Abdurahim Mahmadzarifi	29 January 2001 (age 24)	(Tajikistan) CSKA Pomir
16	GK	Daler Azizov	2000 (age 16)	(Tajikistan) CSKA Pomir
17	DF	Manuchehr Safarov	2000 (age 16)	(Tajikistan) CSKA Pomir
