= 2017 Panda Cup =

Tournament details
- Host country: China
- City: Chengdu, Sichuan
- Dates: 17–21 May 2017
- Teams: 4 (from 2 confederations)
- Venue: 1 (in 1 host city)

Final positions
- Champions: Hungary (1st title)
- Runners-up: Slovakia
- Third place: Iran
- Fourth place: China

Tournament statistics
- Matches played: 6
- Goals scored: 21 (3.5 per match)
- Top scorer(s): (Hungary) Bendegúz Bolla (Iran) Mohammad Sharifi (3 goals)
- Best player: (Iran) Mohammad Sharifi
- Best goalkeeper: (Hungary) Balázs Bese

The 2017 Panda Cup was the fourth edition of Panda Cup, an under-19 association football competition.

The tournament was hosted in Chengdu between 17 and 21 May. Players born on or after 1 January 1999 are eligible to compete in the tournament.

== Participating teams ==
Team	Confederation
China (host)	AFC
Hungary	UEFA
Iran	AFC
Slovakia	UEFA

== Venues ==
Chengdu	Shuangliu Sports Centre is located in China
Chengdu Shuangliu Sports Center	Shuangliu Sports Centre is located in China
30.5704°N 103.8957°E	Shuangliu Sports Centre is located in China
Capacity: 25,000	Shuangliu Sports Centre is located in China

== Standings ==
Pos	Team	Pld	W	D	L	GF	GA	GD	Pts
1	Hungary (C)	3	2	1	0	9	3	+6	7
2	Slovakia	3	2	0	1	4	5	−1	6
3	Iran	3	1	1	1	6	6	0	4
4	China	3	0	0	3	2	7	−5	0

Source: Unknown
Rules for classification: 1) Points; 2) Head to head; 3) Goal difference; 4) Number of goals scored;
(C) Champions

== Matches ==
17 May 2017
15:00

Slovakia	3–2	Iran
Kraľovič 40'; Grešák 52'; Vician 68' (pen.)		Ghaderi 15', 49'

Chengdu Shuangliu Sports Center
Referee: Tang Shunqi (China)
17 May 2017
19:00

China	1–4	Hungary
Erpan 13'		Bolla 2', 81'; Bévárdi 19'; Kisari 79'

Chengdu Shuangliu Sports Center
Referee: He Xiaohu (China)

19 May 2017
15:00

Hungary	3–0	Slovakia
Szabó 18'; Kiss 43'; Stoiacovici 80'

Chengdu Shuangliu Sports Center
Referee: Memetjan Ahmet (China)
19 May 2017
20:00

Iran	2–1	China
Sharifi 51', 74' (pen.)		Zhou Junchen 65'

Chengdu Shuangliu Sports Center
Referee: Jin Jingyuan (China)

21 May 2017
15:00

Hungary	2–2	Iran
Bolla 12'; Lustyik 42'		Shiadeh 70'; Sharifi 72'

Chengdu Shuangliu Sports Center
Referee: Jin Jingyuan (China)
21 May 2017
19:00

China	0–1	Slovakia
		Kraľovič 67'

Chengdu Shuangliu Sports Center
Referee: Tang Shunqi (China)

== Goalscorers ==
3 goals

- (Hungary) Bendegúz Bolla
- (Iran) Mohammad Sharifi

2 goals

- (Iran) Mohammad Ghaderi
- (Slovakia) Michal Kraľovič

1 goal

- (China) Erpan Ezimjan
- (China) Zhou Junchen
- (Hungary) Zsombor Bévárdi
- (Hungary) Tibor Kisari
- (Hungary) Balázs Kiss
- (Hungary) Levente Lustyik
- (Hungary) Dávid Stoiacovici
- (Hungary) Máté Szabó
- (Iran) Sayyad Manesh Shiadeh
- (Slovakia) Matej Grešák
- (Slovakia) Martin Vician
