= Lee Sang-jun =

Lee Sang-jun may refer to:

- Lee Sang-jun (footballer)
- Lee Sang-jun (actor)
