= Alireza Savari =

Iranian footballer

Personal information
- Date of birth: 24 August 2000 (age 26)
- Place of birth: Ahvaz, Iran
- Height: 1.78 m (5 ft 10 in)
- Position: Midfielder

Team information
- Current team: Malavan Tehran

Youth career
- –2021: Foolad

Senior career*
Years	Team	Apps	(Gls)
2018	Foolad	1	(0)
2021–2022	Foolad B		
2022–2023	Naft Ahvaz		
2023–2024	Foolad B		
2024–	Malavan Tehran		

International career^{‡}
2016	Iran U16	4	(0)
- * Club domestic league appearances and goals as of 20 August 2020 ‡ National team caps and goals as of 3 October 2016

Alireza Savari (Persian: علیرضا سواری; born 24 August 2000) is an Iranian footballer who plays as a midfielder for Malavan Tehran.

== Club career ==
=== Foolad ===
He made his debut for Foolad in 16th fixtures of 2018–19 Iran Pro League against Pars Jonoubi Jam.

== Honours ==
Foolad

- Hazfi Cup: 2020–21

Iran U16

- AFC U-16 Championship runner-up: 2016
