= Ali Gholamzadeh =

Iranian footballer

Personal information
- Date of birth: 13 February 2000 (age 26)
- Place of birth: Khuzestan, Iran
- Height: 1.84 m (6 ft 0 in)
- Position: Goalkeeper

Team information
- Current team: Fajr Sepasi
- Number: 1

Youth career
- –2017: Foolad

Senior career*
| Years | Team | Apps | (Gls) |
| 2019–2023 | Foolad | 3 | (0) |
| 2023– | Fajr Sepasi | 97 | (0) |

International career^{‡}
| 2017 | Iran U17 | 5 | (0) |
- * Club domestic league appearances and goals as of 6 May 2025 ‡ National team caps and goals as of 14:24, 15 December 2019 (UTC)

Ali Gholamzadeh (Persian: علی غلامزاده; born 13 February 2000) is an Iranian footballer who plays as a goalkeeper for Persian Gulf Pro League side Fajr Sepasi.

== Career statistics ==
=== Club ===
As of 15 December 2019.

| Club | Season | League | | | Cup | | Continental | | Other | | Total | |
| Club | Season | Division | Apps | Goals | Apps | Goals | Apps | Goals | Apps | Goals | Apps | Goals |
|---|---|---|---|---|---|---|---|---|---|---|---|---|
| Foolad | 2018–19 | Persian Gulf Pro League | 1 | 0 | 0 | 0 | – | | 0 | 0 | 1 | 0 |
| Foolad | 2019–20 | Persian Gulf Pro League | 0 | 0 | 0 | 0 | – | | 0 | 0 | 0 | 0 |
| Career total | | | 1 | 0 | 0 | 0 | 0 | 0 | 0 | 0 | 1 | 0 |

== Honours ==
Foolad

- Hazfi Cup: 2020–21
- Iranian Super Cup: 2021

Iran U16

- AFC U-16 Championship runner-up: 2016
