= Shabeer Razooniya =

Sri Lankan footballer

Personal information
- Full name: Mohamed Shabeer Razooniya
- Date of birth: 27 May 2001 (age 25)
- Place of birth: Slave Island, Sri Lanka
- Height: 1.86 m (6 ft 1 in)
- Position: Striker

Team information
- Current team: Colombo
- Number: 8

Senior career*
Years	Team	Apps	(Gls)
2015–2017	Java Lane		
2017–2018	Sri lanka Police		
2019–	Colombo		

International career^{‡}
2019–	Sri Lanka	3	(0)
- * Club domestic league appearances and goals as of 14:32, 24 September 2021 (UTC) ‡ National team caps and goals as of 14:32, 24 September 2021 (UTC)

Shabeer Razooniya (born 27 May 2001) is a Sri Lankan footballer who plays as a striker for Colombo FC of the Sri Lanka Champions League, and the Sri Lanka national football team.

== Club career ==
Razooniya played for Java Lane SC from 2015 to 2017. In September 2018 he joined Renown SC on a free transfer on a 3.5 year contract ahead of the 2018–19 Sri Lanka Champions League season after season-long stint with Sri lanka Police SC. Razooniya won the Golden Boot award for the top goal scorer of the 2018 Asian School Football Championship held in Agra, India. He scored eight goals in four matches in the tournament. In August 2019 he joined capital side Colombo FC. Razooniya scored in the final of the 2020 President's Cup as Colombo routed Blue Eagles FC 4–0 to win the title after also scoring against his former club Police SC in the quarter-finals.

== International career ==
Razooniya represented Sri Lanka at the youth level in 2018 AFC U-19 Championship qualification. He scored for the team in a 2–2 draw with the Maldives in the team's opening match of the tournament. He was also in the squad in the next edition of the tournament, scoring against Qatar in the first round of qualification. He was called up to the senior national team for the first time in 2018 for the SAFF Championship in September and a friendly against Malaysia national football team in October. He went on to make his debut on 31 May 2019 in a friendly with Laos.

=== International career statistics ===
As of match played 17 January 2020.

Sri Lanka national team
Year	Apps	Goals
2019	2	0
2020	1	0
2021	0	0
Total	3	0

=== U19 international goals ===
Scores and results list Sri Lanka's goal tally first.

No.	Date	Venue	Opponent	Score	Result	Competition
1.	31 October 2017	Hisor Central Stadium, Hisor, Tajikistan	Maldives	1–1	2–2	2018 AFC U-19 Championship qualification
2.	6 November 2019	Aspire Zone, Doha, Qatar	Qatar	1–3	1–5	2020 AFC U-19 Championship qualification
Last updated 24 September 2021
