= Temirbolot Tapayev =

Kyrgyzstani footballer

Personal information
- Full name: Temirbolot Damirbekovich Tapayev
- Date of birth: 1 August 1999 (age 27)
- Place of birth: Bishkek, Kyrgyzstan
- Height: 1.77 m (5 ft 9 1/2 in)
- Position: Winger

Team information
- Current team: Asiagoal Bishkek
- Number: 22

Youth career
- –2018: Dordoi Bishkek

Senior career*
Years	Team	Apps	(Gls)
2018–2020	Dordoi Bishkek		
2018	→ Alga Bishkek (loan)		
2020–2022	Alga Bishkek	62	(14)
2023–2024	Dordoi Bishkek	16	(6)
2024	FC Alga Bishkek	10	(3)

International career
2017	Kyrgyzstan U17	4	(1)
2018–2022	Kyrgyzstan U23	6	(0)
2021–	Kyrgyzstan	2	(0)
- * Club domestic league appearances and goals

Temirbolot Damirbekovich Tapayev (Kyrgyz: Темирболот Тапаев; Russian: Темирболот Дамирбекович Тапаев; born 1 August 1999 in Bishkek) is a Kyrgyz professional footballer who plays as a winger for Asiagoal Bishkek and the Kyrgyzstan national team.

== Club career ==
For the 2020 season, Tapayev was one of the top fifteen scorers in the Kyrgyz Premier League with three goals for Alga Bishkek. To kick off the 2021 Kyrgyz Premier League season, he scored a sensational long range shot which went on to be Alga's game-winner against Ilbirs Bishkek.

On 11 January 2023, Dordoi Bishkek announced the return of Tapayev to the club on a one-year contract.

== International career ==
Tapayev began his international career in 2018 AFC U-19 Championship qualification. He scored a goal in Kyrgyzstan’s third match which ended in a 2–1 victory over Bahrain. He appeared for the Kyrgyzstan under-23 team in one match during the 2018 Asian Games and in 2020 AFC U-23 Championship qualification. In March 2021 he was part of the under-23 squad again for matches against the senior teams of Bangladesh and Nepal in the 2021 Three Nations Cup in Kathmandu.

In September 2018 Tapayev was named to the senior roster for a friendly against Syria. However he did not go on to feature in the match. He made his senior international debut on 2 September 2021 in a 2021 Three Nations Cup friendly against Palestine as a second-half substitute.

=== International career statistics ===
As of match played 7 September 2021.

Kyrgyzstan national team
Year	Apps	Goals
2021	2	0
Total	2	0
