= Umarjon Sharipov =

Tajik footballer (born 2000)

Personal information
- Full name: Umarjon Sharipov (Tajik: Умарджон Шарипов)
- Date of birth: 5 June 2000 (age 26)
- Place of birth: Hisor, Tajikistan
- Height: 1.70 m (5 ft 7 in)
- Position: Midfielder

Team information
- Current team: Khosilot Farkhor
- Number: 63

Youth career
- CSKA Pamir Dushanbe

Senior career*
Years	Team	Apps	(Gls)
2017–2020	Khatlon		
2021	Turon Yaypan	0	(0)
2021–2023	Khatlon		
2024–	Khosilot Farkhor		

International career^{‡}
2020–	Tajikistan	1	(0)
- * Club domestic league appearances and goals as of 08:21, 7 May 2021 (UTC) ‡ National team caps and goals as of 18:28, 3 September 2020 (UTC)

Umarjon Sharipov (Tajik: Умарджон Шарипов; born 5 June 2000) is a Tajik professional footballer who plays as a midfielder for Khosilot Farkhor.

== Career ==
=== International ===
Hanonov made his senior team debut on 3 September 2020 against Uzbekistan.

== Career statistics ==
=== International ===
As of match played 3 September 2020

Appearances and goals by national team and year
National team	Year	Apps	Goals
Tajikistan
Tajikistan	2020	1	0
Total		1	0
