= Enes Isufi =

Albanian footballer

Personal information
- Date of birth: 14 July 2000 (age 26)
- Place of birth: Shkodër, Albania
- Height: 1.83 m (6 ft 0 in)
- Position: Centre back

Team information
- Current team: Lushnja
- Number: 4

Youth career
- 2010–2013: Ada Velipojë
- 2013–2017: Vllaznia Shkodër

Senior career*
Years	Team	Apps	(Gls)
2017–2018	Vllaznia B	12	(1)
2018–2019	Skënderbeu	0	(0)
2019–2020	Luftëtari	26	(0)
2020–2021	Vllaznia Shkodër	0	(0)
2021	→ Tomori (loan)	3	(0)
2021–2022	Kastrioti	0	(0)
2022–	Lushnja	7	(0)

International career
2016	Albania U17	2	(0)
2018	Albania U19	3	(0)
- * Club domestic league appearances and goals as of 20 May 2023

Enes Isufi (born 14 July 2000) is an Albanian professional footballer who plays as a defender for Albanian club Lushnja.

== Career statistics ==
=== Club ===
As of 17 December 2017

Club statistics
Club	Season	League			Cup		Europe (Note: Including continental competitions, such as UEFA Champions League and UEFA Europa League)		Other		Total	
Club	Season	Division	Apps	Goals	Apps	Goals	Apps	Goals	Apps	Goals	Apps	Goals
Vllaznia Shkodër	2017–18	Albanian Superliga	0	0	1	0	—		—		1	0
Vllaznia Shkodër B	2017–18	Albanian First Division	4	0	—		—		—		4	0
Career total			4	0	1	0	—		—		5	0
