= Alireza Ghaderi =

Iranian footballer

Personal information
- Full name: Alireza Ghaderi Zafareh
- Date of birth: 16 February 2000 (age 26)
- Place of birth: Isfahan, Iran
- Position: Right winger

Youth career
- –2018: Zob Ahan

Senior career*
Years	Team	Apps	(Gls)
2018–2021	Zob Ahan	2	(0)
2021–2022	Van Pars	0	(0)

International career
2017	Iran U20	2	(1)
- * Club domestic league appearances and goals

Alireza Ghaderi Zafareh (Persian: علیرضا قادری زفره, born 16 February 2000) is an Iranian former footballer who played as a right winger.

== Club career ==
=== Zob Ahan ===
He made his debut for Zob Ahan in 5th fixtures of 2018–19 Iran Pro League against Machine Sazi while he substituted in for Mohammadreza Abbasi.
