= Alireza Asadabadi =

Iranian association footballer

Personal information
- Date of birth: 23 July 2002 (age 24)
- Place of birth: Kerman, Iran
- Height: 1.70 m (5 ft 7 in)
- Position: Forward

Team information
- Current team: Nirooye Zamini
- Number: 23

Youth career
- –2019: Paykan

Senior career*
Years	Team	Apps	(Gls)
2019–2021	Shahr Khodro	4	(0)
2021–2022	Khooshe Talaee		
2022	Esteghlal Khuzestan	1	(0)
2022–2023	Van Pars	3	(0)
2023–2024	Rotab Alborz Bam	22	(5)
2024	Esteghlal Zeydun		
2024–	Nirooye Zamini	2	(0)

International career^{‡}
2016	Iran U16	6	(3)
2019	Iran U19	7	(1)
- * Club domestic league appearances and goals as of 16 April 2025 ‡ National team caps and goals as of 10 November 2019

Alireza Asadabadi (Persian: علیرضا اسدآبادی; born 23 July 2002) is an Iranian footballer who plays as a forward for Nirooye Zamini.

== Club career ==
Asadabadi made his debut in the Persian Gulf Pro League for Shahr Khodro, appearing off the bench against Foolad.

== Honours ==
=== International ===
Iran U16

- AFC U-16 Championship runner-up: 2016

Iran U19

- CAFA Junior Championship 2019

== Others website ==
Alireza Asadabadi on Instagram
