= Hossein Nokhodkar =

Iranian footballer (born 2002)

Personal information
- Date of birth: 24 February 2002 (age 24)
- Place of birth: Karaj, Iran
- Height: 1.75 m (5 ft 9 in)
- Position: Forward

Team information
- Current team: Fajr Sepasi
- Number: 70

Youth career
- 2015–2018: Saipa

Senior career*
Years	Team	Apps	(Gls)
2018–2021	Saipa	3	(0)
2021	Shahin Bushehr	7	(3)
2021–2023	Gol Gohar	5	(0)
2024–2025	Kheybar	18	(1)
2025–	Fajr Sepasi	5	(0)

International career^{‡}
2016	Iran U16	2	(0)
2017–2019	Iran U19	10	(2)
2021	Iran U23	3	(2)
- * Club domestic league appearances and goals as of 29 April 2025 ‡ National team caps and goals as of 31 October 2021

Hossein Nokhodkar (Persian: حسین نخودکار; born 24 February 2002) is an Iranian professional footballer who plays as a forward for Fajr Sepasi in the Azadegan League.

== Club career ==
Nokhodkar made his debut for Saipa in first fixtures of 2018–19 Iran Pro League against Sepidrood Rasht while he substituted in for Rahim Zahivi.

== Honours ==
Iran U16

- AFC U-16 Championship runner-up: 2016
