= Patrick Scibilio =

Australian footballer

Personal information
- Full name: Patrick Scibilio
- Date of birth: 22 February 2000 (age 26)
- Place of birth: Australia
- Position: Defender

Team information
- Current team: Inter Lions

Youth career
- Sydney United 58
- FNSW NTC

Senior career*
Years	Team	Apps	(Gls)
2016–2017	FFA CoE	25	(0)
2018–2020	Sydney FC NPL	31	(0)
2019–2020	Sydney FC	0	(0)
2020	APIA Leichhardt	10	(0)
2021	Sutherland Sharks	12	(0)
2022–	Inter Lions	76	(8)
- * Club domestic league appearances and goals as of 4 December 2024 ‡ National team caps and goals as of 22 May 2019

Patrick Scibilio (born 22 February 2000), is an Australian professional footballer who plays as a defender for Sydney FC. On 21 May 2019 he made his professional debut in the 2019 AFC Champions League in a group stage match against Kawasaki Frontale.
