= Erpan Ezimjan =

Chinese footballer (born 1999)

Personal information
- Date of birth: 14 January 1999 (age 27)
- Place of birth: Emin County, Tacheng, Xinjiang, China
- Height: 1.78 m (5 ft 10 in)
- Position: Forward

Youth career
- 2012–2016: Xinjiang Vocational Sports Technical College
- 2017–2019: Jiangsu Suning

Senior career*
Years	Team	Apps	(Gls)
2019–2020	Jiangsu Suning	0	(0)
2019	→ Shaanxi Chang'an Athletic (loan)	24	(0)
2021	Qingdao	0	(0)
2022–2023	Jiangxi Lushan	20	(0)
2025	Xinjiang Jindun		

International career
2014	China U16		
2015	China U17		
2017	China U19		
- * Club domestic league appearances and goals as of 14:01, 21 July 2026 (UTC)

Erpan Ezimjan (simplified Chinese: 叶尔凡·叶孜木江; traditional Chinese: 葉爾凡·葉孜木江; pinyin: Yèěrfán Yèzīmùjiāng; Uyghur: ئىرپان ھېزىمجاننى; born 14 January 1999), also known as Ërpan Hëzimjan, Ye Erfan and Erfan Hezim is a Chinese footballer who plays as a forward.

== Club career ==
Born in Emin County in the Tacheng Prefecture of Xinjiang, China, Ezimjan took an interest in football at a young age. He began playing at the age of five, and continued playing in primary and middle school, before enrolling at the Xinjiang Vocational Sports Technical College. In 2013 he played at the Bayern Munich Youth Cup, before being invited to trial with the German club. He joined Jiangsu Suning in 2017, and at the end of the year he was linked with a move to Italian club Inter Milan, as part of a deal the two clubs were arranging for Brazilian Alex Teixeira to make the same move from Jiangsu to Milan.

After the deal with Inter Milan fell through, Ezimjan continued to progress through the academy, and in 2019 he was loaned to China League One club Shaanxi Chang'an Athletic. After twenty-five appearances for Shaanxi Chang'an Athletic, Ezimjan returned to Jiangsu's academy, and in 2020 he was announced as a new loan signing for Taizhou Yuanda – though this move eventually fell through.

In 2021 he went on trial with Qingdao, but was reportedly close to signing with Chongqing Liangjiang Athletic instead. However, in April 2021 it was announced that he had joined Qingdao. After Qingdao were disbanded at the end of the 2021 season, he joined China League One club Jiangxi Lushan.

== International career ==
Ezimjan represented China at under-16, under-17 and under-19 level. In 2017, during the Panda Cup, he scored a bicycle kick goal against Hungary in China's 4–1 loss. The goal was compared to one scored by Swedish striker Zlatan Ibrahimović.

== Personal life ==
Having been promoted to the Jiangsu Suning first team in 2018, and playing in a friendly match against Ukrainian opposition Shakhtar Donetsk in Dubai, Ezimjan was a notable absentee in Jiangsu's opening Chinese Super League fixtures. According to United States propaganda outlet Radio Free Asia, Ezimjan was taken to a "political re-education camp" in February 2018, and player representation organisation FIFPRO issued a statement calling for his release. Chinese propaganda outlet China Daily ran an article on the Xinjiang situation, accusing the west of "smearing" its image, and denied that Ezimjan had been detained.

== Career statistics ==
=== Club ===
As of 21 July 2026.

Appearances and goals by club, season and competition
Club	Season	League			Cup (Note: Includes Chinese FA Cup)		Other		Total	
Club	Season	Division	Apps	Goals	Apps	Goals	Apps	Goals	Apps	Goals
Jiangsu Suning	2019	Chinese Super League	0	0	0	0	0	0	0	0
Jiangsu Suning	2020	Chinese Super League	0	0	0	0	0	0	0	0
Jiangsu Suning	Total		0	0	0	0	0	0	0	0
Shaanxi Chang'an Athletic (loan)	2019	China League One	24	0	1	0	0	0	25	0
Qingdao	2021	Chinese Super League	0	0	1	0	0	0	1	0
Jiangxi Lushan	2022	China League One	13	0	1	0	0	0	14	0
Jiangxi Lushan	2023	China League One	7	0	2	0	0	0	9	0
Jiangxi Lushan	Total		20	0	3	0	0	0	23	0
Career total			22	0	1	0	1	0	24	0
