= Islom Kenjabaev =

Uzbekistani footballer

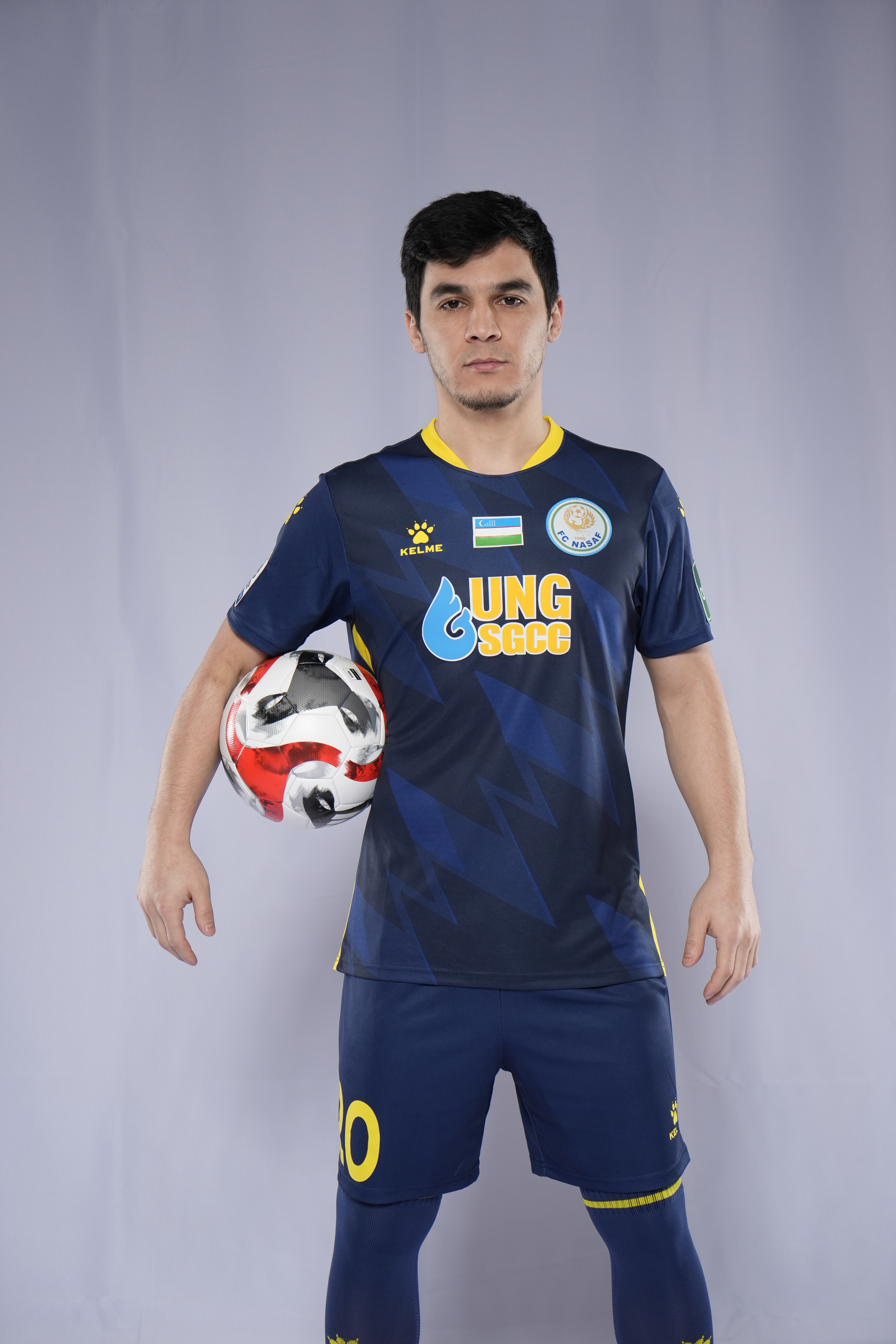

Personal information
- Full name: Islom Kenjaboyev
- Date of birth: 1 September 1999 (age 27)
- Place of birth: Navoi, Uzbekistan
- Height: 1.70 m (5 ft 7 in)
- Position: Midfielder

Team information
- Current team: Qizilqum
- Number: 27

Senior career*
Years	Team	Apps	(Gls)
2017—2021	Nasaf	74	(10)
2021	Jeju United	1	(0)
2021	Qizilqum	14	(0)
2022	Navbahor	11	(0)
2022—2023	Qizilqum	30	(12)
2024—2026	Nasaf	12	(0)
2026—	Qizilqum	0	(0)

International career
2017—2019	Uzbekistan U-20	5	(0)
2018—2021	Uzbekistan U-23	6	(0)
2018	Uzbekistan	3	(0)
- * Club domestic league appearances and goals

Islom Kenjabaev (Uzbek: Islom Kenjaboyev; born September 1, 1999) is an Uzbek footballer, a midfielder for Navoi's club Qizilqum and a former player for the Uzbekistan national football team.

== Career ==
Islam Kenjaboyev was born on September 1, 1999 in Navoi Region. He is a graduate of the Nasaf Football Academy. His first coach was Nurali Sultanov. He studied at the academy from 2012 to 2017. Played for Nasaf's reserve team. In 2017, FC Nasaf head coach Ruziqul Berdiev brought him to the main team. Islam Kenjaboyev played 86 games for Nasaf, scoring 9 goals and providing 4 assists, and playing a total of 5246 minutes on the field.

In 2021, Nasaf received an official offer from Jeju United to sign Islam Kenjaboev, which Nasaf accepted. He played 2 games for Jeju United, playing a total of 102 minutes.

After an unsuccessful stint with Jeju United, Islam Kenjaboev joined Qizilqum as a free agent on 14 July 2021. He made 20 appearances for Qizilqum, scoring 5 goals and providing 2 assists. He played a total of 1758 minutes for the club. On 1 January 2022, Islam Kenjaboyev was loaned to Navbahor. He played in 13 matches for Navbahor and played a total of 401 minutes. He signed a contract with Qizilqum in 2023. In 2024, he joined Nasaf. In 2026, he moved to Qizilqum.
