= Abdullah Murisi =

Qatari footballer (born 1999)

Personal information
- Full name: Abdullah Nasser Murisi
- Date of birth: 24 August 1999 (age 27)
- Height: 1.65 m (5 ft 5 in)
- Position: Winger

Team information
- Current team: Al Bidda
- Number: 27

Senior career*
Years	Team	Apps	(Gls)
2018–2021	Al-Khor	21	(1)
2021–2025	Al-Arabi	29	(1)
2025–	Al Bidda	0	(0)

International career^{‡}
2018-2019	Qatar U20	6	(0)
2018	Qatar U21	4	(1)
2021–	Qatar U23	1	(0)
- * Club domestic league appearances and goals as of 8 May 2023 (UTC) ‡ National team caps and goals as of 8 May 2023 (UTC)

Abdullah Nasser Murisi (born 24 August 1999), is a Qatari professional footballer who plays for Al Bidda as a winger.

== Club career ==
Murisi began his professional career with Al-Khor SC in 2019. In May 2021 he joined Al-Arabi SC.

== Honours ==
- Qatar FA Cup: 2022
