= Riku Tanaka =

Japanese footballer (born 1999)

Personal information
- Date of birth: 4 May 1999 (age 27)
- Place of birth: Chiba, Japan
- Height: 1.67 m (5 ft 6 in)
- Position: Right-back

Team information
- Current team: SC Sagamihara
- Number: 25

Youth career
- Shirai FC
- Kashiwa Reysol

Senior career*
Years	Team	Apps	(Gls)
2018–2020	Kashiwa Reysol	9	(0)
2020	→ Renofa Yamaguchi (loan)	31	(1)
2020–2021	Renofa Yamaguchi	62	(1)
2022-	SC Sagamihara	74	(2)

International career
2015	Japan U17	1	(0)
2016–2017	Japan U18	5	(0)
2017	Japan U19	3	(0)
- * Club domestic league appearances and goals as of 28 January 2026

Riku Tanaka (田中 陸, Tanaka Riku; born 4 May 1999) is a Japanese professional footballer who plays as a right-back for SC Sagamihara.
