= Lim Jae-hyeok =

South Korean footballer

Personal information
- Full name: Lim Jae-hyeok
- Date of birth: 6 February 1999 (age 27)
- Place of birth: South Korea
- Height: 1.80 m (5 ft 11 in)
- Position: Forward

Team information
- Current team: Roi Et PB United
- Number: 10

Youth career
- 2015–2017: Shingal High School

Senior career*
| Years | Team | Apps | (Gls) |
| 2018–2020 | Daegu FC | 8 | (1) |
| 2021 | Ansan Greeners FC | 19 | (0) |
| 2022–2023 | Gimpo Citizen FC | 1 | (0) |
| 2023 | Police Tero | 9 | (1) |
| 2023 | Lampang | 12 | (3) |
| 2023–2024 | Chiangmai United | 11 | (2) |
| 2024 | Trat | 16 | (1) |
| 2025 | Bankhai United | 10 | (4) |
| 2025– | Roi Et PB United | 0 | (0) |

International career^{‡}
| 2014–2016 | South Korea U17 | 6 | (0) |
| 2017 | South Korea U20 | 5 | (2) |
- * Club domestic league appearances and goals as of 13 May 2023 ‡ National team caps and goals as of 13 May 2023

- Lim Jae-hyeok
- Hangul: 임재혁
- Hanja: 林在赫
- RR: Im Jaehyeok
- MR: Im Chaehyŏk

Lim Jae-hyeok (Korean: 임재혁; born 6 February 1999) is a South Korean football forward who plays for Thai League 3 club Roi Et PB United.

== Club career statistics ==
As of 7 December 2019

| Club performance | | | League | | Cup | | Continental | | Total | |
| Season | Club | League | Apps | Goals | Apps | Goals | Apps | Goals | Apps | Goals |
| South Korea | | | League | | KFA Cup | | Asia | | Total | |
|---|---|---|---|---|---|---|---|---|---|---|
| 2018 | Daegu FC | K League 1 | 8 | 1 | 0 | 0 | — | | 8 | 1 |
| 2019 | Daegu FC | K League 1 | 0 | 0 | 0 | 0 | 0 | 0 | 0 | 0 |
| Career total | | | 8 | 1 | 0 | 0 | 0 | 0 | 8 | 1 |
