= Mohammed Ridha Jalil =

Iraqi footballer

Personal information
- Full name: Mohammed Ridha Jalil Mezher Al-Elayawi
- Date of birth: 17 February 2000 (age 26)
- Place of birth: Iraq
- Position: Midfielder

Team information
- Current team: Al-Zawraa SC

Youth career
- 2013–2015: Al-Naft

Senior career*
| Years | Team | Apps | (Gls) |
| 2016–2018 | Al-Talaba | | |
| 2018–2022 | Al-Zawraa | | |
| 2022–2023 | Sanat Naft Abadan | 11 | (0) |
| 2023–2024 | Al-Quwa Al-Jawiya | | |
| 2024–2025 | Al-Zawraa | 8 | (0) |

International career^{‡}
| 2015–2017 | Iraq U17 | 13 | (2) |
| 2017–2018 | Iraq U20 | 1 | (0) |
| 2019– | Iraq | 3 | (0) |
- * Club domestic league appearances and goals as of 23/5/24 @ 14:39(AEST) ‡ National team caps and goals as of 2 December 2019

Mohammed Ridha Jalil Mezher Al-Elayawi (born 17 February 2000) is an Iraqi footballer who plays as a midfielder for Al-Zawraa in the Iraq Stars League.

== International career ==
On 27 November 2019, Ridha won his first international cap for Iraq against Qatar at the 24th Arabian Gulf Cup.

== Personal life ==
Ridha is the nephew of Iraqi international footballer Ali Abbas.

== Honours ==
Al-Zawraa

- Iraq FA Cup: 2018–19
- Iraqi Super Cup: 2021

Iraq U17

- AFC U-16 Championship: 2016
