= Ahmed Fawzi =

Emirati footballer (born 2001)

Personal information
- Date of birth: 26 November 2001 (age 24)
- Place of birth: Fujairah, Fujairah, United Arab Emirates
- Height: 1.69 m (5 ft 7 in)
- Position: Forward

Team information
- Current team: Baniyas
- Number: 9

Senior career*
Years	Team	Apps	(Gls)
2018–2025	Al Jazira	21	(1)
2022–2023	→ Al Dhafra (loan)	10	(1)
2025–	Baniyas	2	(0)

International career^{‡}
2018	United Arab Emirates U19	3	(2)
2023–	United Arab Emirates U23	1	(1)
- * Club domestic league appearances and goals as of 19:44, 4 June 2019 (UTC) ‡ National team caps and goals as of 19:44, 4 June 2019 (UTC)

Ahmed Fawzi (born 26 November 2001) is an Emirati footballer who currently plays as a forward for Baniyas.

== Career statistics ==
=== Club ===
As of 4 June 2019.

Club	Season	League			Cup		Continental		Other		Total	
Club	Season	Division	Apps	Goals	Apps	Goals	Apps	Goals	Apps	Goals	Apps	Goals
Al Jazira	2017–18	UAE Pro-League	1	0	0	0	0	0	0	0	1	0
Al Jazira	2018–19	UAE Pro-League	0	0	0	0	0	0	0	0	0	0
Career total			1	0	0	0	0	0	0	0	1	0
