= Saeid Ahani =

Iranian footballer (born 2001)

Personal information
- Full name: Saeid Ahani
- Date of birth: 9 February 2001 (age 25)
- Place of birth: Mashhad, Iran
- Height: 1.77 m (5 ft 9 1/2 in)
- Position: Right back

Team information
- Current team: Pars Jonoubi Jam
- Number: 96

Youth career
- –2017: Saipa
- 2017–2018: Paykan

Senior career*
Years	Team	Apps	(Gls)
2018–2019	Pars Jonoubi Jam	7	(0)
2019-2021	Naft Masjed Soleyman F.C.	6	(0)
2021	Gol Gohar Sirjan F.C.	0	(0)

International career^{‡}
2016	Iran U16	7	(0)
- * Club domestic league appearances and goals as of 20 December 2019 ‡ National team caps and goals as of 3 October 2016

Saeid Ahani (Persian: سعید آهنی, born 9 February 2001) is an Iranian footballer who plays as a defender who currently plays for Iranian club Pars Jonoubi Jam in the Persian Gulf Pro League.

== Club career ==
=== Pars Jonoubi Jam ===
He made his debut for Pars Jonoubi Jam in 16th fixtures of 2018–19 Iran Pro League against Foolad.

== Honours ==
=== International ===
Iran U16

- AFC U-16 Championship runner-up: 2016
