= Vahid Namdari =

Iranian footballer

Personal information
- Full name: Vahid Namdari Dehghadi
- Date of birth: 26 June 2000 (age 26)
- Place of birth: Dezful, Iran
- Height: 1.80 m (5 ft 11 in)
- Position: Midfielder

Team information
- Current team: Mes Kerman
- Number: 30

Youth career
- Esteghlal Khuzestan

Senior career*
Years	Team	Apps	(Gls)
2017–2019	Esteghlal Khuzestan	33	(3)
2019–2022	Foolad	15	(0)
2022–2023	Sanat Naft	3	(0)
2023–2024	Esteghlal Mollasani	31	(3)
2024–	Mes Kerman	26	(5)

International career^{‡}
2016	Iran U16	8	(1)
2017	Iran U17	5	(1)
2018–2019	Iran U23	6	(2)
- * Club domestic league appearances and goals as of 16 April 2025 ‡ National team caps and goals as of 27 March 2019

Vahid Namdari (Persian: وحید نامداری; born 26 June 2000) is an Iranian football player who plays as midfielder for the Azadegan League club Mes Kerman.

== Honours ==
=== Club ===
Foolad

- Hazfi Cup: 2020–21
- Iranian Super Cup: 2021

=== International ===
Iran U16

- AFC U-16 Championship runner-up: 2016
