= Taha Shariati =

Iranian footballer

Personal information
- Full name: Taha Shariati Khameneh
- Date of birth: 3 March 2000 (age 26)
- Place of birth: Tehran, Iran
- Height: 1.87 m (6 ft 2 in)
- Position: Centre back

Team information
- Current team: Kheybar Khorramabad
- Number: 6

Youth career
- 2012–2016: Moghavemat Tehran
- 2016–2017: Esteghlal
- 2017–2021: Saipa

Senior career*
Years	Team	Apps	(Gls)
2017–2021	Saipa	23	(0)
2021–2022	Naft Masjed Soleyman	0	(0)
2022–2024	Gol Gohar	0	(0)
2024–2025	Nirooye Zamini	44	(0)
2025–2026	Pars Jonoubi	26	(1)
2026–	Kheybar Khorramabad	5	(0)

International career^{‡}
2017	Iran U17	5	(1)
- * Club domestic league appearances and goals as of 04 August 2026 (UTC) ‡ National team caps and goals as of 8 January 2018

Taha Shariati Khameneh (born 3 March 2000) is an Iranian footballer who plays as centre back for the Persian Gulf Pro League club Kheybar Khorramabad.

== International career ==
=== Youth ===
Shariati scored a goal in the 2017 FIFA U-17 World Cup against Costa Rica.

=== International ===
Iran U16

- AFC U-16 Championship runner-up: 2016
