= 2016 AFC U-16 Championship =

Tournament details
- Host country: India
- Dates: 15 September – 2 October
- Teams: 16 (from 1 confederation)
- Venues: 2 (in 2 host cities)

Final positions
- Champions: Iraq (1st title)
- Runners-up: Iran

Tournament statistics
- Matches played: 31
- Goals scored: 109 (3.52 per match)
- Attendance: 32,983 (1,064 per match)
- Top scorer: (Iraq) Dawood Yaseen (6 goals)
- Best player: (Iraq) Dawood Yaseen

The 2016 AFC U-16 Championship was the 17th edition of the AFC U-16 Championship, the biennial international youth football championship organised by the Asian Football Confederation (AFC) for the men's under-16 national teams of Asia. The tournament was held in India, as announced by the AFC on 3 June 2015, and was played between 15 September and 2 October 2016. A total of 16 teams played in the tournament.

Same as previous editions, the tournament acted as the AFC qualifiers for the FIFA U-17 World Cup. The top four teams of the tournament qualified for the 2017 FIFA U-17 World Cup also in India as the AFC representatives, besides India who qualified automatically as hosts. If India were among the top four teams, three play-off matches would be played to decide the fifth-placed team which also qualify for the 2017 FIFA U-17 World Cup; however, this was not necessary as India were eliminated in the group stage.

This marked the first time a U-17 World Cup host nation hosts the AFC U-16 Championship.

Iraq won the tournament after beating Iran 4–3 on penalties in the final match.

== Qualification ==
The draw for the qualifiers was held on 5 June 2015. A total of 45 teams were drawn into eleven groups, with the eleven group winners and the four best runners-up qualifying for the final tournament, together with India who qualified automatically as hosts but also competed in the qualifying stage.

The qualifiers were played between 12–20 September 2015, except for Group H which were played between 2–6 September 2015.

=== Qualified teams ===
The following 16 teams qualified for the final tournament. Nepal were replaced by Kyrgyzstan due to one of their players failing an MRI bone test.

On 12 April 2016, the AFC Competitions Committee decided that if the FIFA suspension of the Kuwait Football Association was not lifted by 13 May 2016, the next highest ranked team in the AFC U-16 Championship qualifying competition would replace Kuwait in the competition.

On 13 May 2016, the FIFA Congress confirmed the suspension of Kuwait, and asked the FIFA Council to lift the suspension as soon as the necessary requirements are fulfilled. As a result, Kuwait were replaced by Yemen, the next highest ranked team in the AFC U-16 Championship qualifying competition.

Team	Qualified as	Appearance	Previous best performance
India	Hosts / Group E (3rd best) runners-up	7th	Quarter-finals (2002)
Uzbekistan	Group A winners	9th	Champions (2012)
Kyrgyzstan	Group B winners	1st	Debut
Iraq	Group C winners	9th	Third place (1985), Semi-finals (2012)
Saudi Arabia	Group D winners	10th	Champions (1985, 1988)
Iran	Group E winners	10th	Champions (2008)
Malaysia	Group G winners	4th	Quarter-finals (2014)
North Korea	Group H winners	10th	Champions (2010, 2014)
South Korea	Group I winners	12th	Champions (1986, 2002)
Australia	Group J winners	5th	Semi-finals (2010, 2014)
Japan	Group K winners	13th	Champions (1994, 2006)
Vietnam	Group J (1st best) runners-up	6th	Fourth place (2000)
Thailand	Group H (2nd best) runners-up	10th	Champions (1998)
United Arab Emirates	Group D (4th best) runners-up	7th	Runners-up (1990)
Oman	Group B (5th best) runners-up	9th	Champions (1996, 2000)
Yemen	Group A (6th best) runners-up	5th	Runners-up (2002)

== Venues ==
The tournament is played in two venues:

Margao	2016 AFC U-16 Championship (India)
Pandit Jawaharlal Nehru Stadium	2016 AFC U-16 Championship (India)
Capacity: 19,000	2016 AFC U-16 Championship (India)
Bambolim	2016 AFC U-16 Championship (India)
GMC Athletic Stadium	2016 AFC U-16 Championship (India)
Capacity: 3,600	2016 AFC U-16 Championship (India)

== Draw ==
The draw for the final tournament was held on 26 May 2016, 15:00 IST (UTC+5:30), in Goa (postponed from 4 May 2016). The 16 teams were drawn into four groups of four teams. The teams were seeded according to their performance in the previous edition in 2014.

Pot 1	Pot 2	Pot 3	Pot 4
India (hosts; position A1); North Korea; South Korea; Australia	Iran; Malaysia; Japan; Uzbekistan	Thailand; Saudi Arabia; Oman; Vietnam	United Arab Emirates; Yemen; Kyrgyzstan; Iraq

== Squads ==
Players born on or after 1 January 2000 were eligible to compete in the tournament. Each team should register a squad of minimum 18 players and maximum 23 players, minimum three of whom must be goalkeepers.

== Group stage ==
The top two teams of each group advance to the quarter-finals.

Tiebreakers

The teams are ranked according to points (3 points for a win, 1 point for a draw, 0 points for a loss). If tied on points, tiebreakers are applied in the following order:

1. Greater number of points obtained in the group matches between the teams concerned;
2. Goal difference resulting from the group matches between the teams concerned;
3. Greater number of goals scored in the group matches between the teams concerned;
4. If, after applying criteria 1 to 3, teams still have an equal ranking, criteria 1 to 3 are reapplied exclusively to the matches between the teams in question to determine their final rankings. If this procedure does not lead to a decision, criteria 5 to 9 apply;
5. Goal difference in all the group matches;
6. Greater number of goals scored in all the group matches;
7. Penalty shoot-out if only two teams are involved and they are both on the field of play;
8. Fewer score calculated according to the number of yellow and red cards received in the group matches (1 point for a single yellow card, 3 points for a red card as a consequence of two yellow cards, 3 points for a direct red card, 4 points for a yellow card followed by a direct red card);
9. Drawing of lots.

All times are local, IST (UTC+5:30).

=== Group A ===
Pos	Team	Pld	W	D	L	GF	GA	GD	Pts	Qualification
1	Iran	3	2	1	0	7	3	+4	7	Knockout stage
2	United Arab Emirates	3	2	1	0	7	4	+3	7	Knockout stage
3	Saudi Arabia	3	0	1	2	6	9	−3	1	
4	India (H)	3	0	1	2	5	9	−4	1	

Source: AFC
Rules for classification: Group stage tiebreakers
(H) Hosts
15 September 2016
16:00

Iran	3–2	Saudi Arabia
Sayyadmanesh 47'; Ghaderi 69'; Asadabadi 70'	Report	Al Beshe 4'; Al-Anazi 42'

Pandit Jawarharlal Nehru Stadium, Margao
Attendance: 637
Referee: Kim Dae-yong (South Korea)
15 September 2016
19:00

India	2–3	United Arab Emirates
Stalin 11'; Boris 36'	Report	Aydh 34'; Rashed 53'; Fawzi 74'

Pandit Jawarharlal Nehru Stadium, Margao
Attendance: 1,014
Referee: Hiroyuki Kimura (Japan)

18 September 2016
16:00

United Arab Emirates	1–1	Iran
Dawood 51'	Report	Asadabadi 49'

Pandit Jawarharlal Nehru Stadium, Margao
Attendance: 412
Referee: Sukhbir Singh (Singapore)
18 September 2016
19:00

Saudi Arabia	3–3	India
Al-Dhuwayhi 34'; Al-Buraikan 82', 83'	Report	Jadhav 6'; Chetri 22'; Suresh 90+5' (pen.)

Pandit Jawarharlal Nehru Stadium, Margao
Attendance: 4,137
Referee: Wang Di (China)

21 September 2016
19:00

India	0–3	Iran
	Report	Ghaderi 23'; Sharifi 81' (pen.), 90+1' (pen.)

Pandit Jawarharlal Nehru Stadium, Margao
Attendance: 5,892
Referee: Yaqoob Abdul Baki (Oman)
21 September 2016
19:00

Saudi Arabia	1–3	United Arab Emirates
Al-Duraywish 65'	Report	Fawzi 42'; Ali Khamis 74'; Al Naqbi 81'

GMC Stadium, Bambolim
Attendance: 700
Referee: Kim Dae-yong (South Korea)

=== Group B ===
Pos	Team	Pld	W	D	L	GF	GA	GD	Pts	Qualification
1	Japan	3	3	0	0	21	0	+21	9	Knockout stage
2	Vietnam	3	2	0	1	6	10	−4	6	Knockout stage
3	Kyrgyzstan	3	1	0	2	2	11	−9	3	
4	Australia	3	0	0	3	2	10	−8	0	

Source: AFC
Rules for classification: Group stage tiebreakers
16 September 2016
16:00

Australia	0–1	Kyrgyzstan
	Report	Kanybekov 76' (pen.)

GMC Stadium, Bambolim
Attendance: 100
Referee: Sivakorn Pu-udom (Thailand)
16 September 2016
20:00

Japan	7–0	Vietnam
Kubo 16', 64'; Fukuoka 24', 51'; Miyashiro 40'; Kemmotsu 79'; Yamada 85'	Report

GMC Stadium, Bambolim
Attendance: 100
Referee: Aziz Asimov (Uzbekistan)

19 September 2016
16:00

Kyrgyzstan	0–8	Japan
	Report	Tanahashi 34', 54', 80' (pen.); Kubo 42', 90+2'; Nakamura 43', 52'; Suzuki 56' (pen.)

GMC Stadium, Bambolim
Attendance: 250
Referee: Yaqoob Abdul Baki (Oman)
19 September 2016
20:00

Vietnam	3–2	Australia
Nguyễn Hữu Thắng 51', 61'; Nguyễn Duy Khiêm 86'	Report	Roberts 18', 28'

GMC Stadium, Bambolim
Attendance: 1,467
Referee: Masoud Tufayelieh (Syria)

22 September 2016
16:00

Australia	0–6	Japan
	Report	Kozuki 4', 82'; Miyashiro 54'; Sehata 56'; Matsumoto 64'; Tanahashi 86'

GMC Stadium, Bambolim
Attendance: 430
Referee: Sivakorn Pu-udom (Thailand)
22 September 2016
16:00

Vietnam	3–1	Kyrgyzstan
Nguyễn Khắc Khiêm 20'; Dzhakybaliev 81' (o.g.); Nguyễn Trần Việt Cường 88'	Report	Alykulov 6'

Pandit Jawarharlal Nehru Stadium, Margao
Attendance: 355
Referee: Khamis Al-Kuwari (Qatar)

=== Group C ===
Pos	Team	Pld	W	D	L	GF	GA	GD	Pts	Qualification
1	Oman	3	1	2	0	4	1	+3	5	Knockout stage
2	Iraq	3	1	2	0	4	3	+1	5	Knockout stage
3	South Korea	3	1	1	1	4	2	+2	4	
4	Malaysia	3	0	1	2	1	7	−6	1	

Source: AFC
Rules for classification: Group stage tiebreakers
16 September 2016
16:00

South Korea	1–2	Iraq
Jeong Chan-young 43'	Report	Muntadher 45+2' (pen.), 50' (pen.)

Pandit Jawarharlal Nehru Stadium, Margao
Attendance: 462
Referee: Rowan Arumughan (India)
16 September 2016
19:00

Malaysia	0–3	Oman
	Report	Al-Alawi 20' (pen.), 78'; Al-Malki 63' (pen.)

Pandit Jawarharlal Nehru Stadium, Margao
Attendance: 341
Referee: Mooud Bonyadifar (Iran)

19 September 2016
16:00

Iraq	1–1	Malaysia
Jalil 43'	Report	Aliff 86'

Pandit Jawarharlal Nehru Stadium, Margao
Attendance: 46
Referee: Hiroyuki Kimura (Japan)
19 September 2016
19:00

Oman	0–0	South Korea
	Report

Pandit Jawarharlal Nehru Stadium, Margao
Attendance: 812
Referee: Aziz Asimov (Uzbekistan)

22 September 2016
20:00

South Korea	3–0	Malaysia
Park Jeong-in 4'; Cheon Seong-hoon 14' (pen.); Ko Jun-hee 84'	Report

Pandit Jawarharlal Nehru Stadium, Margao
Attendance: 231
Referee: Aziz Asimov (Uzbekistan)
22 September 2016
20:00

Oman	1–1	Iraq
Al Alawi 90'	Report	Yaseen 37'

GMC Stadium, Bambolim
Attendance: 1,106
Referee: Wang Di (China)

=== Group D ===
Pos	Team	Pld	W	D	L	GF	GA	GD	Pts	Qualification
1	Uzbekistan	3	3	0	0	9	4	+5	9	Knockout stage
2	North Korea	3	2	0	1	7	4	+3	6	Knockout stage
3	Yemen	3	0	1	2	1	4	−3	1	
4	Thailand	3	0	1	2	5	10	−5	1	

Source: AFC
Rules for classification: Group stage tiebreakers
17 September 2016
16:00

North Korea	2–0	Yemen
Kim Pom-hyok 61', 75'	Report

GMC Stadium, Bambolim
Attendance: 35
Referee: Çarymyrat Kurbanow (Turkmenistan)
17 September 2016
20:00

Uzbekistan	5–3	Thailand
Muydinov 24' (pen.); Yuldoshov 45+2' (pen.), 89'; Wudtichai 57' (o.g.); Abdullaev 82'	Report	Jinnawat 2'; Arnon 58', 90+4'

GMC Stadium, Bambolim
Attendance: 1,300
Referee: Khamis Al-Kuwari (Qatar)

20 September 2016
16:00

Yemen	0–1	Uzbekistan
	Report	Sobirjonov 69'

GMC Stadium, Bambolim
Attendance: 550
Referee: Rowan Arumughan (India)
20 September 2016
20:00

Thailand	1–4	North Korea
Hassawat 69'	Report	Kye Tam 41' (pen.), 63', 67'; Ri Kang-guk 79'

GMC Stadium, Bambolim
Attendance: 1,150
Referee: Mooud Bonyadifar (Iran)

23 September 2016
19:00

North Korea	1–3	Uzbekistan
Ri Kang-guk 75'	Report	Umrzakov 49'; Yuldoshov 62'; Ganikhonov 68'

GMC Stadium, Bambolim
Attendance: 973
Referee: Masoud Tufayelieh (Syria)
23 September 2016
19:00

Thailand	1–1	Yemen
Natthaphon 47'	Report	Hassawat 27' (o.g.)

Pandit Jawaharlal Nehru Stadium, Margao
Attendance: 377
Referee: Çarymyrat Kurbanow (Turkmenistan)

== Knockout stage ==
In the knockout stage, penalty shoot-out is used to decide the winner if necessary (extra time is not used).

=== Bracket ===
Quarter-finals
25 September – Margao
Iran	5
Vietnam	0
26 September – Margao
Oman	1 (2)
North Korea (p)	1 (4)
25 September – Bambolim
Japan	1
United Arab Emirates	0
26 September – Bambolim
Uzbekistan	0
Iraq	2

Semi-finals
29 September – Margao
Iran (p)	1 (6)
North Korea	1 (5)
29 September – Bambolim
Japan	2
Iraq	4

Final
2 October – Margao
Iran	0 (3)
Iraq (p)	0 (4)

=== Quarter-finals ===
Winners qualify and join India as representatives from the AFC in the 2017 FIFA U-17 World Cup.

25 September 2016
16:00

Iran	5–0	Vietnam
Sayyadmanesh 30', 72'; Ghaderi 47'; Asadabadi 62'; Khodamoradi 69'	Report

Pandit Jawaharlal Nehru Stadium, Margao
Attendance: 557
Referee: Hiroyuki Kimura (Japan)

25 September 2016
20:00

Japan	1–0	United Arab Emirates
Seko 31'	Report

GMC Stadium, Bambolim
Attendance: 2,428
Referee: Mooud Bonyadifar (Iran)

26 September 2016
16:00

Oman	1–1	North Korea
Al Jahdhami 80'	Report	Kim Pom-hyok 84'
Penalties
Al-Alawi (penalty missed); Al-Qaidi (penalty scored); Al Malki (penalty scored); Al Jahdhami (penalty missed)	2–4	(penalty scored) Kye Tam; (penalty scored) Yun Min; (penalty missed) Kim Kyong-sok; (penalty scored) Cha Kwang; (penalty scored) Kim Pom-hyok

Pandit Jawaharlal Nehru Stadium, Margao
Attendance: 655
Referee: Sukhbir Singh (Singapore)

26 September 2016
19:00

Uzbekistan	0–2	Iraq
	Report	Yaseen 7', 79'

GMC Stadium, Bambolim
Attendance: 1,673
Referee: Wang Di (China)

=== Semi-finals ===
29 September 2016
16:00

Japan	2–4	Iraq
Yamada 29', 42'	Report	Yaseen 18', 81' (pen.), 90+4' (pen.); Abdul-Sada 67'

GMC Stadium, Bambolim
Attendance: 1,542
Referee: Rowan Arumughan (India)

29 September 2016
19:00

Iran	1–1	North Korea
Sharifi 19'	Report	Kye Tam 80' (pen.)
Penalties
Sharifi (penalty scored); Esmaeilzadeh (penalty scored); Ahani (penalty scored); Khodamoradi (penalty missed); Asadabadi (penalty scored); Shariati (penalty scored); Zadeh (penalty scored)	6–5	(penalty scored) Kye Tam; (penalty scored) Yun Min; (penalty scored) Kim Chung-jin; (penalty missed) Cha Kwang; (penalty scored) Kim Pom-hyok; (penalty scored) Paek Kwang-min; (penalty missed) Kim Kyong-sok

Pandit Jawaharlal Nehru Stadium, Margao
Attendance: 1,014
Referee: Aziz Asimov (Uzbekistan)

=== Final ===
2 October 2016
18:00

Iran	0–0	Iraq
	Report
Penalties
Sharifi (penalty scored); Namdari (penalty scored); Ahani (penalty missed); Shariati (penalty missed); Esmaeilzadeh (penalty scored)	3–4	(penalty scored) Sartip; (penalty scored) Abdul-Sada; (penalty scored) Radha; (penalty missed) Muntadher; (penalty scored) Yaseen

Pandit Jawaharlal Nehru Stadium, Margao
Attendance: 2,237
Referee: Wang Di (China)

== Winners ==
AFC U-16 Championship 2016 winners

Iraq
First title

== Awards ==
Most Valuable Player

- (Iraq) Dawood Yaseen

Top Scorer

- (Iraq) Dawood Yaseen

Fair Play

- Iraq

== Goalscorers ==
6 goals

- (Iraq) Dawood Yaseen

4 goals

- (Japan) Takefusa Kubo
- (Japan) Akito Tanahashi
- (North Korea) Kye Tam

3 goals

- (Iran) Alireza Asadabadi
- (Iran) Allahyar Sayyadmanesh
- (Iran) Mohammad Sharifi
- (Iran) Mohammad Ghaderi
- (Japan) Hiroto Yamada
- (Oman) Arshad Al-Alawi
- (North Korea) Kim Pom-hyok
- (Uzbekistan) Rasul Yuldoshov

2 goals

- (Australia) John Roberts
- (Iraq) Muntadher Mohammed
- (Japan) Shimpei Fukuoka
- (Japan) Soichiro Kozuki
- (Japan) Taisei Miyashiro
- (Japan) Keito Nakamura
- (North Korea) Ri Kang-guk
- (Saudi Arabia) Firas Al-Buraikan
- (Thailand) Arnon Prasongporn
- (United Arab Emirates) Ahmad Fawzi
- (Vietnam) Nguyễn Hữu Thắng

1 goal

- (India) Aman Chetri
- (India) Aniket Jadhav
- (India) Sanjeev Stalin
- (India) Boris Singh
- (India) Suresh Singh
- (Iran) Amir Khodamoradi
- (Iraq) Ridha Jalil
- (Iraq) Muntadher Abdul-Sada
- (Japan) Takuma Kemmotsu
- (Japan) Nagi Matsumoto
- (Japan) Gijo Sehata
- (Japan) Ayumu Seko
- (Japan) Toichi Suzuki
- (Saudi Arabia) Dhari Al-Anazi
- (Saudi Arabia) Mansor Al Beshe
- (Saudi Arabia) Abdulaziz Al-Dhuwayhi
- (Saudi Arabia) Nawaf Al-Duraywish
- (Kyrgyzstan) Adilet Kanybekov
- (Kyrgyzstan) Gulzhigit Alykulov
- (South Korea) Cheon Seong-hoon
- (South Korea) Jeong Chan-young
- (South Korea) Ko Jun-hee
- (South Korea) Park Jeong-in
- (Malaysia) Aliff Haiqal
- (Oman) Muadh Al Jahdhami
- (Oman) Yousuf Al Malki
- (Thailand) Jinnawat Russamee
- (Thailand) Natthaphon Srisawat
- (Thailand) Hassawat Nopnate
- (United Arab Emirates) Abdullah Al Naqbi
- (United Arab Emirates) Abdulaziz Dawood
- (United Arab Emirates) Ali Khamis
- (United Arab Emirates) Majed Rashed
- (United Arab Emirates) Manea Aydh
- (Uzbekistan) Ibrokhim Ganikhonov
- (Uzbekistan) Abubakir Muydinov
- (Uzbekistan) Mardon Abdullaev
- (Uzbekistan) Asadbek Sobirjonov
- (Uzbekistan) Jasurbek Umrzakov
- (Vietnam) Nguyễn Duy Khiêm
- (Vietnam) Nguyễn Khắc Khiêm
- (Vietnam) Nguyễn Trần Việt Cường

1 own goal

- (Kyrgyzstan) Maksat Dzhakybaliev (against Vietnam)
- (Thailand) Wudtichai Kumkeam (against Uzbekistan)
- (Thailand) Hassawat Nopnate (against Yemen)

Source: the-afc.com

== Ban on North Korean manager and goalkeeper ==
On 4 November 2016, the AFC announced that North Korean manager Yun Jong-su and goalkeeper Jang Paek-ho were banned for a year for bringing the game into disrepute following the deliberate conceding of a goal during their final group match against Uzbekistan. The goal in question was conceded in the 49th minute, which Jang appeared to duck out of the way of a direct kick from Uzbek goalkeeper Jasurbek Umrzakov. Uzbekistan won the match 3–1 and finished top of the group, meaning they would meet Iraq in the quarter-finals, and they went on to lose. North Korea, as group runners-up, met Oman in the quarter-finals, which they won to qualify for the 2017 FIFA U-17 World Cup. The ban means both Yun and Jang are suspended from the 2017 FIFA U-17 World Cup.

The North Korean team were also placed on a suspended ban from the 2018 AFC U-19 Championship. While they will be allowed to compete in the qualifiers, if the team engage in similar behaviour, they will be automatically ejected from the competition.
