= Lee Sang-jun (footballer) =

South Korean footballer (born 1999)

Personal information
- Date of birth: 14 October 1999 (age 27)
- Place of birth: South Korea
- Height: 1.70 m (5 ft 7 in)
- Positions: Full-back; winger

Team information
- Current team: Cheonan City FC
- Number: 7

Senior career*
Years	Team	Apps	(Gls)
2018–2024	Busan IPark	56	(3)
2022–2023	→ Jinju Citizen FC (loan)	50	(18)
2025–	Cheonan City FC	53	(10)

International career^{‡}
2016	South Korea U17	4	(0)
2017–2019	South Korea U20	14	(2)
Medal record
Men's football
Representing South Korea
FIFA U-20 World Cup
Runner-up	2019 Poland
- * Club domestic league appearances and goals as of 6 August 2026 ‡ National team caps and goals as of 14:18, 7 June 2019 (UTC)

- Lee Sang-jun
- Hangul: 이상준
- Hanja: 李相俊
- RR: I Sangjun
- MR: I Sangjun

Lee Sang-jun (Korean: 이상준; born 14 October 1999) is a South Korean footballer who plays as a full-back or winger for Cheonan City FC in the K League 2.

== Career statistics ==
=== Club ===
As of 16 December 2023.

Club	Season	League			Cup		Playoffs		Total	
Club	Season	Division	Apps	Goals	Apps	Goals	Apps	Goals	Apps	Goals
Busan IPark	2018	K League 2	1	0	0	0	0	0	1	0
Busan IPark	2019	K League 2	4	1	0	0	0	0	4	1
Busan IPark	2020	K League 1	16	0	3	0	0	0	19	0
Busan IPark	2021	K League 2	7	0	2	0	0	0	9	0
Jinju Citizen	2022	K4 League	21	4	0	0	0	0	21	4
Jinju Citizen	2023	K4 League	29	14	1	1	1	1	31	16
Career total			78	19	6	1	1	1	85	21

== Honours ==
=== International ===
==== South Korea U20 ====
- FIFA U-20 World Cup runner-up: 2019
