= Mohammad Sharifi (footballer, born 2000) =

Iranian footballer

Personal information
- Date of birth: 21 March 2000 (age 26)
- Place of birth: Bushehr, Iran
- Height: 1.85 m (6 ft 1 in)
- Position: Midfielder

Team information
- Current team: Esteghlal Khuzestan
- Number: 6

Youth career
- 2011–2016: Foolad

Senior career*
Years	Team	Apps	(Gls)
2016–2017	Esteghlal Khuzestan	3	(0)
2017–2020	Saipa	9	(0)
2018–2019	→ Esteghlal Khuzestan (loan)	34	(0)
2020–2022	Persepolis	11	(0)
2022–2023	Nassaji Mazandaran	24	(1)
2024–2025	Damash Gilan	14	(0)
2025	Be'sat Kermanshah	15	(0)
2025–	Esteghlal Khuzestan	23	(1)

International career^{‡}
2015–2017	Iran U17	15	(8)
2017	Iran U20	3	(0)
2019	Iran U23	2	(0)
- * Club domestic league appearances and goals as of 22 April 2025 ‡ National team caps and goals as of 13 November 2019

Mohammad Sharifi (Persian: محمد شریفی; born 21 March 2000) is an Iranian professional footballer who plays as a midfielder for Persian Gulf Pro League club Esteghlal Khuzestan.

In 2017, Sharifi was chosen by The Guardian as one of the best 60 young talents in world football.

== Club career ==
=== Esteghlal Khuzestan ===
Originally Sharifi signed with Saba Qom in the summer of 2016 to work with Ali Daei, however after Daei left the club before the start of the season, the contract was not finalized. Instead, Sharifi signed with Persian Gulf Pro League champions, Esteghlal Khuzestan.

Sharifi made his professional debut on 24 November 2016 in a 0–0 draw against FC Mashhad, coming on as a second-half substitute. He became one of the youngest ever players to play in the Persian Gulf Pro League.

=== Saipa ===
After the end of the 2016–17 season Sharifi left Esteghlal Khuzestan, and in the summer of 2017 he signed a contract with Tehran-based club Saipa.

=== Persepolis ===
On 31 October 2020, Sharifi signed a two-year contract with Persian Gulf Pro League champions Persepolis. After signing the contract, he announced:

"It is an honour to play for Persepolis".

== Career statistics ==
=== Club ===
As of 2 June 2022

Club	Division	Season	League		Cup		Asia		Total	
Club	Division	Season	Apps	Goals	Apps	Goals	Apps	Goals	Apps	Goals
Esteghlal Khuzestan	Pro League	2016–17	3	0	1	0	0	0	4	0
Esteghlal Khuzestan	Total		3	0	1	0	0	0	4	0
Saipa	Pro League	2017–18	7	0	0	0	—		7	0
Saipa	Pro League	2019–20	14	0	1	0	—		15	0
Saipa	Total		21	0	1	0	—		22	0
Esteghlal Khuzestan (loan)	Pro League	2018–19	25	1	2	0	—		27	1
Esteghlal Khuzestan (loan)	Total		25	1	2	0	—		27	1
Persepolis	Pro League	2020–21	3	0	3	0	2	0	8	0
Persepolis	Pro League	2021–22	8	0	1	1	1	0	10	1
Persepolis	Total		11	0	4	1	3	0	18	1
Career totals			60	1	8	1	3	0	71	2

== International career ==
=== U-17 ===
Sharifi was a regular call up with the Iran national under-17 football team and was the team captain as Iran finished second in the 2016 AFC U-16 Championship.

== Honours ==
=== Club ===
Persepolis

- Persian Gulf Pro League (1): 2020–21
- Iranian Super Cup (1): 2020; Runner-up (1): 2021

=== International ===
Iran U16

- AFC U-16 Championship Runner-up (1): 2016
