= Amir Hossein Khodamoradi =

Iranian footballer (born 2000)

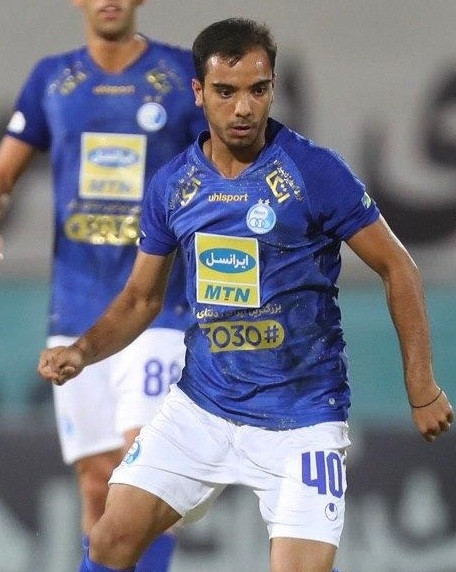

Personal information
- Full name: Amir Hossein Khodamoradi
- Date of birth: September 13, 2000 (age 26)
- Place of birth: Shahriar, Iran
- Height: 1.74 m (5 ft 9 in)
- Position: Attacking midfielder

Team information
- Current team: Havadar
- Number: 70

Youth career
- 2016–2019: Paykan
- 2019–2020: Esteghlal

Senior career*
Years	Team	Apps	(Gls)
2020–2021	Esteghlal	6	(0)
2021–	Havadar	8	(1)

International career
2016–2017	Iran U17	2	(0)
- * Club domestic league appearances and goals

Amir Hossein Khodamoradi (Persian: امیرحسین خدامرادی; born September 13, 2000, in Shahriar) is an Iranian footballer who plays as a midfielder who currently plays for Iranian club Havadar in the Persian Gulf Pro League.

== Club career ==
=== Esteghlal ===
He made his debut for Esteghlal in 24th fixtures of 2019–20 Persian Gulf Pro League against Tractor while he substituted in for Farshid Esmaeili.
