= Mohammad Ghaderi =

Iranian footballer

Personal information
- Date of birth: 27 February 2000 (age 26)
- Place of birth: Bandar Abbas, Iran
- Height: 1.66 m (5 ft 5 in)
- Position: Midfielder

Team information
- Current team: Tractor
- Number: 99

Senior career*
Years	Team	Apps	(Gls)
2018–2020	Machine Sazi	33	(2)
2020–2022	Tractor	42	(1)
2022	Malavan F.C.	13	(0)

International career^{‡}
2016	Iran U16	9	(4)
2017	Iran U17	4	(0)
- * Club domestic league appearances and goals as of 30 November 2021 ‡ National team caps and goals as of 10 October 2020

Mohammad Ghaderi (Persian: محمد قادری; born 27 February 2000) is an Iranian footballer who plays as a midfielder for Persian Gulf Pro League side Tractor.

== Career statistics ==
=== Club ===
As of 15 December 2019.

Club	Season	League			Cup		Continental		Other		Total	
Club	Season	Division	Apps	Goals	Apps	Goals	Apps	Goals	Apps	Goals	Apps	Goals
Machine Sazi	2018–19	Persian Gulf Pro League	3	0	2	0	–		0	0	5	0
Machine Sazi	2019–20	Persian Gulf Pro League	27	2	1	0	–		0	0	28	2
Machine Sazi	Total		30	2	3	0	0	0	0	0	33	2
Tractor	2020-21	Persian Gulf Pro League	12	1	1	0	5	0	1	0	19	1
Tractor	2021-22	Persian Gulf Pro League	22	0	1	0	0	0	0	0	23	0
Tractor	Total		34	1	2	0	5	0	1	0	42	1
Malavan	2022-23	Persian Gulf Pro League	11	0	2	0	0	0	0	0	13	0
Career total			75	3	7	0	5	0	1	0	89	3

== Honours ==
=== International ===
Iran U16

- AFC U-16 Championship runner-up: 2016
