= List of Palestine national football team managers =

The male Palestinian national (association) football team has been under the supervision of 19 different permanent managers since 1998.

Manager	Year(s)	Pld	W	D	L	W%	Major competitions
(Argentina) Ricardo Cagurati	1998	3	0	1	2	0.00	—
(Israel) Azmi Nassar	1999–2000	10	3	2	5	30.00	2000 Asian Cup – Failed to qualify
(Egypt) Mansour Hamid El-Bouri	2001	3	0	1	2	33.33	—
(Egypt) Mustafa Abdel-Ghali Yacoub	2001	6	2	1	3	33.33	2002 World Cup – Failed to qualify
(Poland) Andrzej Wiśniewski	2002	2	0	0	2	0.00	—
(Chile) Nicola Hadwa	2002–2004	11	0	5	6	0.00	2004 Asian Cup – Failed to qualify
(Austria) Alfred Riedl	2004	9	2	3	4	22.22	2006 World Cup – Failed to qualify
(Israel) Azmi Nassar	2005–2007	11	5	1	5	45.45	2007 Asian Cup – Failed to qualify
(Chile) Nelson Dekmak	2007	1	0	0	1	0.00	—
(Jordan) Ezzat Hamza	2008–2009	5	0	3	2	0.00	—
(Palestine) Jamal Daraghmeh	2009	3	0	0	3	0.00	—
(France) Moussa Bezaz	2009–2011	16	3	6	7	18.75	2010 World Cup – Failed to qualify 2014 World Cup – Failed to qualify
(Jordan) Jamal Mahmoud	2011–2014	32	14	6	12	43.75	2015 Asian Cup – Group stage
(Palestine) Saeb Jendeya (Note: Interim)	2014	2	2	0	0	100.00	—
(Palestine) Ahmed Al Hassan	2014–2015	7	1	1	5	14.28	—
(Palestine) Abdel Nasser Barakat	2015–2017	19	11	6	2	54.89	2018 World Cup – Failed to qualify 2019 Asian Cup – Group stage
(Bolivia) Julio César Baldivieso	2017–2018	2	0	1	1	0.00	—
(Algeria) Noureddine Ould Ali	2018–2021	33	12	10	11	33.36	2022 World Cup – Failed to qualify
(Tunisia) Makram Daboub	2021–present	33	11	8	14	33.33	2021 Arab Cup – Group stage 2023 Asian Cup – Round of 16
Totals		205	66	54	85	32.19	5 out of 13 tournaments

Last updated: 15 November 2024. Statistics include FIFA-recognised matches only.
