= Marco Bahamonde =

Chilean footballer (born 1980)

Personal information
- Full name: Marco Antonio Bahamonde Nilian
- Date of birth: 14 June 1980 (age 46)
- Place of birth: Río Negro, Chile
- Position: Midfielder

Youth career
- –1998: Provincial Osorno
- 1998–1999: Boca Juniors

Senior career*
| Years | Team | Apps | (Gls) |
| 1997–1998 | Provincial Osorno | 8 | (1) |
| 1999–2001 | Boca Juniors | | |
| 2000–2001 | → El Porvenir (loan) | | |
| 2001 | → Provincial Osorno (loan) | | |
| 2002–2004 | Provincial Osorno | | |
| 2005 | Estrella del Sur | | |
| 2006 | Pedro Aguirre Cerda | | |
| 2007 | Deportivo Arauco | | |
- * Club domestic league appearances and goals

Marco Antonio Bahamonde Nilian (born 14 June 1980) is a Chilean former professional footballer who played as a midfielder for clubs in Chile and Argentina. He is one of the few Chilean players who were with Boca Juniors.

== Career ==
Born in Río Negro, Chile, Bahamonde is a product of Provincial Osorno youth system and made his professional debut at the age of seventeen thanks to the coach Juan Carlos Carotti, making appearances for the club in 1997 and 1998 in the Chilean top flight.

In 1998, he joined Argentine club Boca Juniors in a transfer by US$150,000 thanks to his agent Eduardo Petrini, along with his fellow Alberto González, where they coincided with players such as Sebastián Battaglia, Juan Román Riquelme, Martín Palermo, among others. He played for the reserve team, joining the first team in 1999. In 2000, he made appearances in matches against Racing Club, Vélez Sarsfield and River Plate, wearing the number 10, which is highly related to great players such as Juan Román Riquelme, Diego Maradona and Alberto Márcico.

After a stint on loan at El Porvenir in 2000–01 alongside his fellows Juan Arostegui, Guillermo Báez, Domingo Cardozo and Gabriel Amadei, he tried to sign with Universidad Católica in his country of birth, but he finally joined Provincial Osorno in 2001, coinciding again with González. He stayed with the club until 2004, with whom he won a qualifier for the 2003 Copa Sudamericana, being included in the squad for that international tournament.

He ended his career playing for Estrella del Sur, Pedro Aguirre Cerda and Deportivo Arauco in the Chilean Tercera División.

He retired due to a serious ankle injury.

== Post-retirement ==
Bahamonde has coached amateur clubs such as Camilo Henríquez from Rahue and worked in freight, removals and pest control.

He has gone on playing football at amateur level along with Alberto González, in clubs such as Municipal from Osorno.

== Honours ==
Provincial Osorno

- Liguilla Pre-Sudamericana: 2003
