= Diego González (footballer, born August 1998) =

Chilean footballer

Personal information
- Full name: Diego Humberto González Saavedra
- Date of birth: 28 August 1998 (age 28)
- Place of birth: Quillota, Chile
- Height: 1.75 m (5 ft 9 in)
- Position: Midfielder

Team information
- Current team: Provincial Osorno

Youth career
- Coquimbo Unido

Senior career*
Years	Team	Apps	(Gls)
2017–2018	Coquimbo Unido	27	(0)
2019–2022	O'Higgins	17	(0)
2021	→ Cobresal (loan)	7	(0)
2023	Deportes Limache	17	(0)
2024	Deportes Linares	23	(0)
2025	Brujas de Salamanca	14	(0)
2026–	Provincial Osorno	0	(0)
- * Club domestic league appearances and goals as of 6 March 2026

Diego Humberto González Saavedra (born 28 August 1998) is a Chilean footballer who plays as a midfielder for Chilean Segunda División Profesional side Provincial Osorno.

== Career ==
González made his professional debut playing for Coquimbo Unido in a Primera B match against Iberia on 18 October 2017 by substitution of Kilian Delgado at the minute 91.

After winning the 2018 Campeonato Loto with Coquimbo Unido, he was transferred to Primera División side O'Higgins. On 15 April 2021, he was loaned to Cobresal for all 2021 season.

After returning to O'Higgins in 2022, he joined Deportes Limache for the 2023 season, winning the league title. The next season, he switched to Deportes Linares.

On 19 February 2026, González joined Provincial Osorno.

== Personal life ==
He is nicknamed Oso (Bear).

== Honours ==
Coquimbo Unido

- Primera B: 2018

Deportes Limache

- Segunda División Profesional: 2023
