= Juan Pablo Miño =

Argentine-Chilean footballer

Personal information
- Full name: Juan Pablo Miño Peña
- Date of birth: 23 August 1987 (age 39)
- Place of birth: Rosario, Argentina
- Height: 1.73 m (5 ft 8 in)
- Position: Midfielder

Team information
- Current team: Brujas de Salamanca
- Number: 26

Youth career
- Central Córdoba

Senior career*
Years	Team	Apps	(Gls)
2006–2008	Central Córdoba	58	(0)
2009	San Luis	29	(1)
2010	Deportes Antofagasta	28	(1)
2011–2014	Coquimbo Unido	103	(6)
2014–2015	Cobresal	30	(0)
2015–2017	Audax Italiano	53	(2)
2018–2019	Deportes Iquique	40	(1)
2020	Santiago Wanderers	23	(1)
2021–2022	Deportes Iquique	34	(3)
2023–2024	Douglas Haig	29	(3)
2024	Unión San Felipe	7	(0)
2025–	Brujas de Salamanca	6	(0)
- * Club domestic league appearances and goals as of 4 May 2025

Juan Pablo Miño Peña (born 23 August 1987) is an Argentine naturalized Chilean footballer who plays as a midfielder for Brujas de Salamanca.

== Career ==
After playing for Deportes Iquique until 2022, Miño returned to his country of birth and joined Douglas Haig in the Torneo Federal A.

In the second half of 2024, Miño returned to Chile to play for Unión San Felipe.

== Personal life ==
Miño became a naturalized Chilean by residence.

== Honours ==
San Luis de Quillota

- Primera B (1): 2009 Apertura

Cobresal

- Primera División de Chile (1): 2015 Clausura
