= Mazzolini =

Mazzolini is a surname. Notable people with the surname include:

- Paul Mazzolini (born 1960), Italian singer, songwriter, musician, and record producer
- Serafino Mazzolini (1890–1945), Italian politician
- Stéphane Mazzolini (born 1966), French football player
- Sylvester Mazzolini (1456/1457–1527), Italian theologian
