= Alberto González (Chilean footballer) =

Chilean footballer (born 1980)

Personal information
- Full name: Alberto Andrés González Paredes
- Date of birth: 1980 (age 45–46)
- Place of birth: Osorno, Chile
- Position: Midfielder

Youth career
- Provincial Osorno
- 1998: Boca Juniors

Senior career*
Years	Team	Apps	(Gls)
1998–2000	Boca Juniors		
2000–2003	Provincial Osorno		
2001	→ Iberia (loan)		
2004–2005	Sriwijaya Palembang		
2007	PSLS Lhokseumawe		
- Gaspa Palopo
- * Club domestic league appearances and goals

Alberto Andrés González Paredes (born 1980) is a Chilean former professional footballer who played as a midfielder for clubs in Chile, Mexico, Vietnam and Indonesia.

== Career ==
Born in Osorno, Chile, in March 1998 González joined Boca Juniors along with his fellow Marco Bahamonde, where they coincided with players such as Sebastián Battaglia, Juan Román Riquelme, Martín Palermo, among others. He played for the reserve team until 2000 before returning to Chile. He has been one of the few Chilean players who have were with Boca Juniors.

In Chile, he played for Provincial Osorno, with a stint on loan at Iberia. As a member of Provincial Osorno, he won a qualifier for the 2003 Copa Sudamericana and, once in the tournament, took part in a notorious match against Universidad Católica, where the referee Patricio Polic was thoroughly criticized.

Then he moved abroad again to play in Mexico, Vietnam and Indonesia, where he played for Sriwijaya Palembang, PSLS Lhokseumawe and Gaspa Palopo.

He retired in 2009.

== Personal life ==
González is also known by his nickname Charly and has gone on playing football at amateur level after his retirement along with Marco Bahamonde, in clubs such as Municipal from Osorno.

== Honours ==
Provincial Osorno

- Liguilla Pre-Sudamericana: 2003
