= Diego Vergara =

Chilean footballer (born 2002)

Personal information
- Full name: Diego Gerard Vergara Bernales
- Date of birth: 4 August 2002 (age 24)
- Place of birth: Quintero, Chile
- Height: 1.81 m (5 ft 11 in)
- Position: Midfielder

Team information
- Current team: Provincial Osorno

Youth career
- Coquimbo Unido

Senior career*
Years	Team	Apps	(Gls)
2019–2021	Coquimbo Unido	8	(0)
2022	Provincial Ovalle	–	(–)
2023	Unión Compañías	–	(–)
2024–2025	Brujas de Salamanca	17	(0)
2026–	Provincial Osorno	0	(0)
- * Club domestic league appearances and goals as of 18 February 2026

Diego Gerard Vergara Bernales (born 4 August 2002) is a Chilean footballer who plays as a midfielder for Provincial Osorno in the Segunda División Profesional de Chile.

== Career ==
Despite being on the professional squad of Coquimbo Unido since 2019 season, he made his professional debut against Universidad Católica on 5 September 2020.

In February 2026, Vergara joined Provincial Osorno from Brujas de Salamanca.

== Career statistics ==
As of 14 February 2021.

Club	Season	League			Cup		Continental		Other		Total	
Club	Season	Division	Apps	Goals	Apps	Goals	Apps	Goals	Apps	Goals	Apps	Goals
Coquimbo Unido	2019	Primera; División	0	0	0	0	—		0	0	0	0
Coquimbo Unido	2020	Primera; División	8	0	—		1 (Note: Appearances in the Copa Sudamericana)	0	0	0	9	0
Total career			8	0	0	0	1	0	0	0	9	0

== Honours ==
Coquimbo Unido

- Primera B: 2021
