= Lucas Giovini =

Argentine-born Chilean footballer (born 1981)

Personal information
- Full name: Lucas Raúl Giovini Schiapino
- Date of birth: 13 October 1981 (age 45)
- Place of birth: La Laguna, Argentina
- Height: 1.93 m (6 ft 4 in)
- Position: Goalkeeper

Senior career*
Years	Team	Apps	(Gls)
2000–2001	Almirante Brown	0	(0)
2001–2002	Luján	5	(0)
2002–2004	Villa Dálmine	48	(0)
2004–2005	Brown de Adrogué	10	(0)
2005–2006	Acassuso	26	(0)
2007–2008	Colegiales	37	(0)
2008–2009	Unión San Felipe	47	(0)
2010–2012	Unión La Calera	110	(0)
2013–2014	Ñublense	45	(0)
2014–2016	Unión La Calera	59	(0)
2016–2017	Quilmes	0	(0)
2017–2019	Unión La Calera	16	(0)
2020–2021	Magallanes	28	(0)
2021	Unión San Felipe	27	(0)
Total		458	(0)
- * Club domestic league appearances and goals

Lucas Raúl Giovini Schiapino (born 13 October 1981) is an Argentine naturalized Chilean former footballer who played as a goalkeeper.

== Career ==
He retired at the end of the 2021 season.

== Personal life ==
In 2014 Giovini gained Chilean nationality.

== Honours ==
=== Club ===
Villa Dálmine

- Primera C (1): 2001–02

Colegiales

- Primera C (1): 2007–08

Unión San Felipe

- Primera B de Chile (1): 2009
- Primera B de Chile (1): 2009 Apertura
- Copa Chile (1): 2009

Unión La Calera

- Primera B de Chile (1): 2017 Transición
