= René Charrier =

Austrian-born French footballer (born 1951)

Personal information
- Date of birth: 23 November 1951 (age 74)
- Place of birth: Innsbruck, Austria
- Position: Goalkeeper

Youth career
- 1966–1970: FC Brignoud
- 1970: FC Chaumont
- 1970–1972: Paris-Joinville

Senior career*
Years	Team	Apps	(Gls)
1972–1974	CS Sedan Ardennes		
1974–1980	Olympique de Marseille	65	(0)
1977–1978	→ Paris FC (loan)		
1980–1982	SR Saint-Dié		

International career
1975	France	2	(0)
- * Club domestic league appearances and goals

René Charrier (born 23 November 1951) is a retired professional French footballer who played goalkeeper.
