= Nelson Mores =

Chilean football manager

Personal information
- Full name: Nelson Selim Mores Docmac
- Date of birth: 27 October 1959 (age 67)
- Place of birth: Puente Alto, Santiago, Chile
- Position: Goalkeeper

Senior career*
Years	Team	Apps	(Gls)
- Provincial Osorno

Managerial career
- 2000–2001: Provincial Osorno
- –2005: Provincial Osorno (youth)
- 2005–2006: Provincial Osorno
- 2006: Curicó Unido
- 2006: Provincial Osorno
- 2007: Palestine
- 2012: Provincial Osorno
- 2013: Deportes Puerto Montt
- 2018–2019: Provincial Osorno
- * Club domestic league appearances and goals

Nelson Selim Mores Docmac (born 27 October 1959), known as Nelson Dekmak in Palestine, is a Chilean football manager and former goalkeeper.

== Career ==
As a football goalkeeper, Mores played for Provincial Osorno.

As a football manager, he has led Provincial Osorno, Curicó Unido and Deportes Puerto Montt in his homeland. A historical manager of Provincial Osorno, he has led them five times, also in the top division.

A Palestinian descendant, he was the manager of the Palestine national team in 2007 by replacing Azmi Nassar.

After coaching Provincial Osorno until January 2019, Mores assumed as sport manager in October of the same year for the 2020 season.

== Personal life ==
Mores is a Palestinian descendant.

In Palestine, he is known as Nelson Dekmak.
