= Kilian Delgado =

Chilean footballer (born 1990)

Personal information
- Full name: Kilian Delgado Quijones
- Date of birth: 1 April 1990 (age 36)
- Place of birth: Valdivia, Chile
- Positions: Midfielder; striker

Team information
- Current team: Provincial Osorno

Youth career
- Deportes Valdivia

Senior career*
Years	Team	Apps	(Gls)
2009–2016	Deportes Valdivia	85	(9)
2016–2019	Coquimbo Unido	55	(9)
2020–2021	Cobreloa	24	(3)
2021	San Marcos	26	(5)
2022	Fernández Vial	19	(0)
2023–	Provincial Osorno	0	(0)
- * Club domestic league appearances and goals as of 31 December 2020

Kilian Delgado Quijones (born 1 April 1990) is a Chilean footballer who plays for Provincial Osorno in the Segunda División Profesional de Chile.

== Career ==
Delgado started his football career in Deportes Valdivia the year 2009, through the various divisions of the Chilean football with the club. In the year 2016 achieved with the Torreon the title of the Segunda División. Completed its contract with Deportes Valdivia, signed with Coquimbo Unido, club with which will play for the year 2016.

== Honors ==
Deportes Valdivia

- Segunda División Profesional: 2015–16

Coquimbo Unido

- Primera B de Chile: 2018
