= Fabián Carmona =

Chilean footballer (born 1994)

Personal information
- Full name: Fabián Alejandro Carmona Fredes
- Date of birth: March 21, 1994 (age 32)
- Place of birth: Santiago, Chile
- Height: 1.76 m (5 ft 9 1/2 in)
- Position: Attacking midfielder

Team information
- Current team: Brujas de Salamanca

Youth career
- 2003–2014: Universidad de Chile

Senior career*
Years	Team	Apps	(Gls)
2012–2018	Universidad de Chile	31	(7)
2017	→ Palestino (loan)	23	(4)
2018	→ Deportes La Serena (loan)	20	(1)
2020	Deportes Santa Cruz	23	(6)
2021	Audax Italiano	10	(1)
2022–2023	Coquimbo Unido	40	(4)
2024	San Luis	26	(0)
2025	Deportes Melipilla	0	(0)
2025	Santiago City	17	(7)
2026–	Brujas de Salamanca	0	(0)
- * Club domestic league appearances and goals as of 17 February 2026

Fabián Alejandro Carmona Fredes (born 21 March 1994) is a Chilean footballer who plays as an attacking midfielder for Brujas de Salamanca.

== Career ==
He debuted on 9 September 2012 in a match against Santiago Wanderers for the 2012 Copa Chile, scoring the first goal of the match. He played his first league match on 29 September in a match against Unión La Calera

In 2024, Carmona joined San Luis de Quillota from Coquimbo Unido. The next year, he joined Deportes Melipilla.

In February 2026, Carmona joined Brujas de Salamanca from Santiago City.

== Career statistics ==
=== Club ===
Club	Season	League		Continental		Cup		Total	
Club	Season	Apps	Goals	Apps	Goals	Apps	Goals	Apps	Goals
Universidad de Chile	2012	1	0	0	0	3	1	4	1
Universidad de Chile	2013	0	0	0	0	0	0	0	0
Universidad de Chile	2013–14	7	3	1	0	0	0	8	3
Universidad de Chile	2014–15	12	3	1	0	1	1	14	4
Universidad de Chile	2015–16	5	1	0	0	6	3	11	4
Universidad de Chile	2016–17	6	0	0	0	1	1	7	1
Universidad de Chile	Total	31	7	2	0	11	6	44	13
Career total		31	7	2	0	11	6	44	13
