= Juan Gutiérrez (footballer, born 1990) =

Chilean footballer (born 1990)

Personal information
- Full name: Juan Rodrigo Gutiérrez Arenas
- Date of birth: February 11, 1990 (age 36)
- Place of birth: Santiago, Chile
- Height: 1.63 m (5 ft 4 in)
- Position: Midfielder

Team information
- Current team: Provincial Osorno
- Number: 8

Youth career
- 2002–2009: Colo-Colo

Senior career*
Years	Team	Apps	(Gls)
2010–2012	Barnechea	40	(9)
2013	Ñublense	17	(2)
2014–2015	Unión San Felipe	0	(0)
2015–2016	Deportes Temuco	12	(0)
2016–2017	Iberia	39	(6)
2018–2020	Cobresal	58	(2)
2021	Deportes Temuco	34	(2)
2022–2023	Rangers	46	(3)
2024–	Provincial Osorno	30	(3)
- * Club domestic league appearances and goals as of 5 May 2025

Juan Rodrigo Gutiérrez Arenas (born 8 July 1990) is a Chilean footballer who plays as a midfielder for Provincial Osorno.

== Career ==
A product of the Colo-Colo youth system, Gutiérrez has mainly played for clubs in the Chilean second level such as Barnechea, Unión San Felipe, Deportes Temuco, among others. As a member of Deportes Temuco, he won the 2015–16 Primera B de Chile.

== Honours ==
Deportes Temuco

- Primera B de Chile: 2015–16
