= Jorge Dubanced =

Argentine football player and manager (1950–2026)

Personal information
- Full name: Jorge Roberto Dubanced Conversano
- Date of birth: 28 June 1950
- Place of birth: Buenos Aires, Argentina
- Date of death: 15 October 2026 (aged 76)
- Position: Forward

Youth career
- Defensores de Belgrano

Senior career*
Years	Team	Apps	(Gls)
1967–1969	Defensores de Belgrano	39	(13)
1969	Argentinos Juniors	1	(0)
1970	Deportivo Morón	14	(1)
1971–1972	Defensores de Belgrano	(total)	(↑)
1972	Lusitano		
1973–1974	Santiago Wanderers	44	(27)
1975	Colo-Colo	15	(4)
1976	Deportes Concepción	4	(1)
1976	Atlético Bucaramanga		
1977	Talleres	0	(0)
1978	Villa Dálmine	16	(2)
1979	Deportivo Municipal		
1980	San Martín Tucumán		
1981	Excursionistas		

Managerial career
- 1995–1996: Excursionistas
- 1997–1998: Platense FC
- San Miguel
- 2000: Estudiantes BA
- 2001: Platense (assistant)
- 2005: Provincial Osorno
- 2007: Gimnasia de Mendoza
- 2008: Deportivo Morón (assistant)
- * Club domestic league appearances and goals

Jorge Roberto Dubanced Conversano (28 June 1950 – 15 October 2026) was an Argentine professional footballer who played as a forward. Besides Argentina, he played for clubs in South Africa, Chile, Colombia and Peru. He died on 15 October 2026, at the age of 76.

== Playing career ==
- (Argentina) Defensores de Belgrano 1967–1969
- (Argentina) Argentinos Juniors 1969
- (Argentina) Deportivo Morón 1970
- (Argentina) Defensores de Belgrano 1971–1972
- (South Africa) Lusitano 1972
- (Chile) Santiago Wanderers 1973–1974
- (Chile) Colo-Colo 1975
- (Chile) Deportes Concepción 1976
- (Colombia) Atlético Bucaramanga 1976
- (Argentina) Talleres de Córdoba 1977
- (Argentina) Villa Dálmine 1978
- (Peru) Deportivo Municipal 1979
- (Argentina) San Martín de Tucumán 1980
- (Argentina) Excursionistas 1981

== Managerial career ==
- (Argentina) Excursionistas 1995–1996
- (Honduras) Platense FC 1997–1998
- (Argentina) San Miguel
- (Argentina) Estudiantes de Buenos Aires 2000
- (Chile) Provincial Osorno 2005
- (Argentina) Gimnasia y Esgrima de Mendoza 2007
