= Gonzalo Lauler =

Chilean footballer (born 1989)

Personal information
- Full name: Gonzalo René Lauler Godoy
- Date of birth: 14 January 1989 (age 37)
- Place of birth: Osorno, Chile
- Height: 1.81 m (5 ft 11 1/2 in)
- Position: Centre-back

Team information
- Current team: Provincial Osorno

Senior career*
Years	Team	Apps	(Gls)
2007–2010	Provincial Osorno	49	(0)
2011–2012	Audax Italiano	0	(0)
2012	→ Deportes Temuco (loan)	23	(0)
2013–2016	Barnechea	79	(0)
2016–2021	Deportes Melipilla	153	(3)
2022–2023	Universidad de Concepción	45	(1)
2024–2025	Deportes Santa Cruz	30	(1)
2025–	Provincial Osorno	0	(0)
- * Club domestic league appearances and goals as of 12 March 2025

Gonzalo René Lauler Godoy (born 14 January 1989) is a Chilean footballer who plays as a centre-back for Provincial Osorno.

== Career ==
In March 2025, Lauler ended his contract with Deportes Santa Cruz due to personal reasons and returned to Provincial Osorno, the first team in his career.

== Personal life ==
His half-brother, Carlos Lauler Zañartu, born in 1996, is a Chilean basketball player just like his father, Carlos Sr. Gonzalo met Carlos Jr. at adult age.

== Honours ==
=== Player ===
Provincial Osorno

- Primera B (1): 2007
