= Noureddine Ould Ali =

Algerian football manager (born 1972)

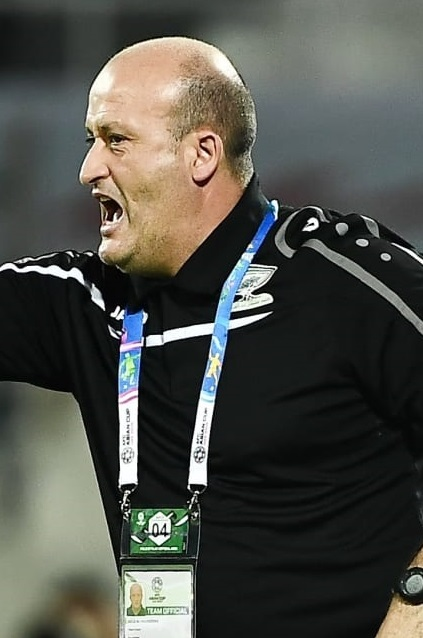
- Ould Ali with Palestine at the 2019 AFC Asian Cup

Personal information
- Full name: Noureddine Ould Ali
- Date of birth: 23 June 1972 (age 54)
- Place of birth: Bab El Oued, Algeria

Team information
- Current team: Yemen (head coach)

Managerial career
- Years: Team
- 2010–2011: Bahrain (assistant)
- 2012: Palestine (assistant)
- 2012–2013: MC Alger (assistant)
- 2014–2018: Palestine (assistant)
- 2018–2021: Palestine
- 2022–2023: Algeria U23
- 2024–: Yemen

Noureddine Ould Ali (Arabic: نور الدين ولد علي; born 23 June 1972) is an Algerian football coach who is head coach of the Yemen national team.

== Early life ==
Ould Ali was born in Bab El Oued, a suburb of the capital of Algiers, Algeria on 23 June 1972. He played football in the town of Aïn Bénian, before attending university.

== Coaching career ==
In 1992, Ould Ali began coaching US Chaouia under-20s. Following a spell at Chaouia, Ould Ali moved to France to coach at Marseille-based club US Rouet. At Rouet, Ould Ali met former France international François Bracci. After leaving Rouet, Ould Ali followed Bracci to Algeria, becoming assistant manager under Bracci at CS Constantine and MC Alger. In 2013, Ould Ali moved to USM Alger, becoming assistant to Rolland Courbis.

In 2018, having been assistant to former manager Abdel Nasser Barakat, Ould Ali succeeded Julio César Baldivieso as manager of Palestine. He first began coaching work with the Palestinian national team in 2010, and by 2018 he had spent more than five years with them.

He led Palestine in the country's second Asian Cup appearance, where Palestine was eliminated without scoring a goal and after obtaining only two points, having played two goalless draws against Syria and Jordan. Then, he led the Palestinians to the 2022 World Cup qualification, where the Palestinians managed to create a shock home win over Uzbekistan 2–0, leaving enthusiasm among Palestinians. Yet, after the historic win, the team suffered two denting defeats to Singapore and Yemen, before letting the Uzbeks take vengeance on away ground. Due to the performance of Palestine in the qualification, Ould Ali suffered criticism from Palestinian football platform.

=== Managerial statistics ===
As of 17 November 2026

Managerial record by team and tenure
Team	From	To	Record							
Team	From	To	G	W	D	L	GF	GA	GD	Win %
Palestine	22 April 2018	21 April 2021	29	9	10	10	27	36	−9	31.03
Yemen	1 February 2024		22	7	5	10	39	31	+8	31.82
Total			51	16	15	20	66	67	−1	31.37
