= Daniel Retamal =

Chilean footballer (born 1995)

Personal information
- Full name: Daniel Enrique Retamal Vargas
- Date of birth: June 17, 1995 (age 31)
- Place of birth: Lo Barnechea, Chile
- Height: 1.78 m (5 ft 10 in)
- Position: Goalkeeper

Team information
- Current team: Provincial Osorno

Youth career
- Magallanes

Senior career*
| Years | Team | Apps | (Gls) |
| 2013–2016 | Magallanes | 3 | (0) |
| 2016–2021 | Coquimbo Unido | 8 | (0) |
| 2021 | San Marcos | 4 | (0) |
| 2022–2023 | Deportes Puerto Montt | 17 | (0) |
| 2024 | Deportes Linares | 1 | (0) |
| 2024–2025 | San Luis | 38 | (0) |
| 2026– | Provincial Osorno | 0 | (0) |
- * Club domestic league appearances and goals as of 20 February 2024

Daniel Enrique Retamal Vargas (born June 17, 1995) is a Chilean footballer who plays as a goalkeeper for Provincial Osorno in the Segunda División Profesional de Chile.

== Career ==
In 2024, Retamal signed with Deportes Linares in the Segunda División Profesional de Chile. In the second half of the same year, he switched to San Luis de Quillota.

In January 2026, Retamal joined Provincial Osorno.

== Personal life ==
His older brother, Felipe, is also a footballer who was with Italian side Reggina at youth level and has played for both Deportes Melipilla and Deportes Colina. In addition, his father, Anselmo, is a goalkeeping coach.

== Career statistics ==
As of 11 February 2021.

| Club | Season | League | | | Cup | | Continental | | Other | | Total | |
| Club | Season | Division | Apps | Goals | Apps | Goals | Apps | Goals | Apps | Goals | Apps | Goals |
|---|---|---|---|---|---|---|---|---|---|---|---|---|
| Magallanes | 2013–14 | Primera B | 2 | 0 | 0 | 0 | — | | 0 | 0 | 2 | 0 |
| Magallanes | 2014–15 | Primera B | 1 | 0 | 0 | 0 | — | | 0 | 0 | 1 | 0 |
| Magallanes | 2015–16 | Primera B | 0 | 0 | 0 | 0 | — | | 0 | 0 | 0 | 0 |
| Magallanes | Total | | 3 | 0 | 0 | 0 | — | | 0 | 0 | 3 | 0 |
| Coquimbo; Unido | 2016–17 | Primera B | 0 | 0 | 0 | 0 | — | | 0 | 0 | 0 | 0 |
| Coquimbo; Unido | 2017–T | Primera B | 0 | 0 | 0 | 0 | — | | 0 | 0 | 0 | 0 |
| Coquimbo; Unido | 2018 | Primera B | 8 | 0 | 4 | 0 | — | | 0 | 0 | 12 | 0 |
| Coquimbo; Unido | 2019 | Primera; División | 0 | 0 | 0 | 0 | — | | 0 | 0 | 0 | 0 |
| Coquimbo; Unido | 2020 | Primera; División | 0 | 0 | — | | 0 (Note: Appearances in the Copa Sudamericana) | 0 | 0 | 0 | 0 | 0 |
| Coquimbo; Unido | Total | | 8 | 0 | 4 | 0 | 0 | 0 | 0 | 0 | 12 | 0 |
| Total career | | | 11 | 0 | 4 (Note: Appearances in the Copa Chile) | 0 | 0 | 0 | 0 | 0 | 15 | 0 |
