= Job Bogmis =

Cameroonian footballer (born 2000)

Personal information
- Date of birth: 5 August 2000 (age 26)
- Place of birth: Yaoundé, Cameroon
- Height: 1.78 m (5 ft 10 in)
- Position: Forward

Team information
- Current team: Provincial Osorno

Youth career
- 2019–2020: Universidad de Concepción

Senior career*
Years	Team	Apps	(Gls)
2020–2024	Universidad de Concepción	40	(4)
2020–2021	→ General Velásquez (loan)	15	(2)
2024	→ Fernández Vial (loan)	13	(2)
2025	José Vergara Keller	–	(–)
2026	Fernández Vial	2	(4)
2026–	Provincial Osorno	0	(0)
- * Club domestic league appearances and goals as of 8 March 2026

Job Bogmis (born 5 August 2000) is a Cameroonian professional footballer who plays as a forward for Chilean club Provincial Osorno.

== Early life ==
Bogmis was born in 2000 in Cameroon. He is a native of Yaoundé, Cameroon.

== Career ==
Bogmis started his career with Chilean side Universidad de Concepción. He suffered from racism an opposing player while playing for the club. In 2020, he was sent on loan to Chilean side General Velásquez. In 2024, he signed for Chilean side Fernández Vial.

After a year as a free agent and playing for club José Vergara Keller from Lota, Bogmis returned to Fernández Vial in 2026 for the Octogonal del Biobío. On 6 March of the same year, he signed with Provincial Osorno in the Segunda División Profesional de Chile.

== Style of play ==
Bogmis mainly operates as a forward. He has been described as having "dizzying power and potency".

== Personal life ==
Bogmis has a daughter. He can speak Spanish.

In 2025, Bogmis served as a football coach and English assistant teacher for students from Golden School from Chiguayante.
