= Claudio Nigretti =

Argentine football manager and player

Personal information
- Full name: Claudio Javier Nigretti
- Date of birth: 11 December 1958 (age 67)
- Place of birth: Buenos Aires, Argentina
- Position: Forward

Youth career
- Lanús

Senior career*
Years	Team	Apps	(Gls)
1978–1984	Lanús	76	(28)
1985–1987	Deportivo Español	48	(6)
1987–1989	Deportivo Italiano	43	(7)
1989–1990	Defensores de Belgrano	15	(1)
1990–1991	Talleres RdE	40	(15)
1991–1992	Atlético Rafaela	31	(6)
1992–1993	Los Andes		
1993	Villa Dálmine	13	(2)

Managerial career
- 1993: Lanús (youth) (coordinator)
- 1995: Deportivo Español (assistant)
- 1996: Banfield (assistant)
- 1997: Deportivo Español (youth)
- 1998–1999: Deportivo Laferrere
- 2000: Estudiantes BA
- 2001: San Telmo
- 2002: Juventud Antoniana
- 2003: Provincial Osorno
- 2005: Deportes Temuco
- 2007: Unión La Calera
- 2009: Atlanta
- 2010: Provincial Osorno
- 2012–2013: Talleres RdE
- 2016: Talleres RdE
- * Club domestic league appearances and goals

Claudio Javier Nigretti (born 11 December 1958) is an Argentine football manager and former player who played as a forward.

== Career ==
Born in Buenos Aires, Argentina, Nigretti developed his entire career in his homeland. A product of Lanús, he started his career with them in the Primera C Metropolitana. He also played for Deportivo Español, Deportivo Italiano, Defensores de Belgrano, Talleres de Remedios de Escalada, Atlético de Rafaela, Los Andes and Villa Dálmine.

As a football coach, Nigretti started his career as coordinator for the Lanús youth teams in 1994–95 and assistant coach for Deportivo Español and Banfield.

As a head coach, he started leading Deportivo Laferrere in 1998. The next years, he coached Estudiantes de Buenos Aires, winning the 1999–00 Primera B Metropolitana, San Telmo and Juventud Antoniana before moving to Chile to led Provincial Osorno in 2003. With Provincial Osorno, he qualified to the 2003 Copa Sudamericana after winning the Pre-Copa Sudamericana Tournament.

In Chile, Nigretti also led Deportes Temuco in 2005, Unión La Calera in 2007 and Provincial Osorno again in 2010.

Back to Argentina, Nigretti coached Atlanta in 2009 and Talleres de Remedios de Escalada.
