= Chaumont FC =

French football club

Chaumont
- Full name: Chaumont Football Club
- Founded: 1957; 69 years ago
- Ground: Stade Georges Dodin, Chaumont
- Capacity: 5,000
- Chairman: Jean-Pierre Delamarre
- Manager: Joël Matagne
- League: CFA 2 Group C
- Website: https://chaumont-fc.footeo.com/
Home colours	Away colours

Chaumont Football Club is a French association football club founded in 1957. The club is based in Chaumont, Haute-Marne and its home stadium is the Stade Georges Dodin in the town, which has a capacity of 5,000 spectators. It had professional status from 1966 to 1969 and from 1970 to 1991. As of the 2009–10 season, the club plays in the Championnat de France amateur 2 Group C, the fifth tier of French football. It is managed by former AJ Auxerre and Olympique de Marseille defender, Stéphane Mazzolini.

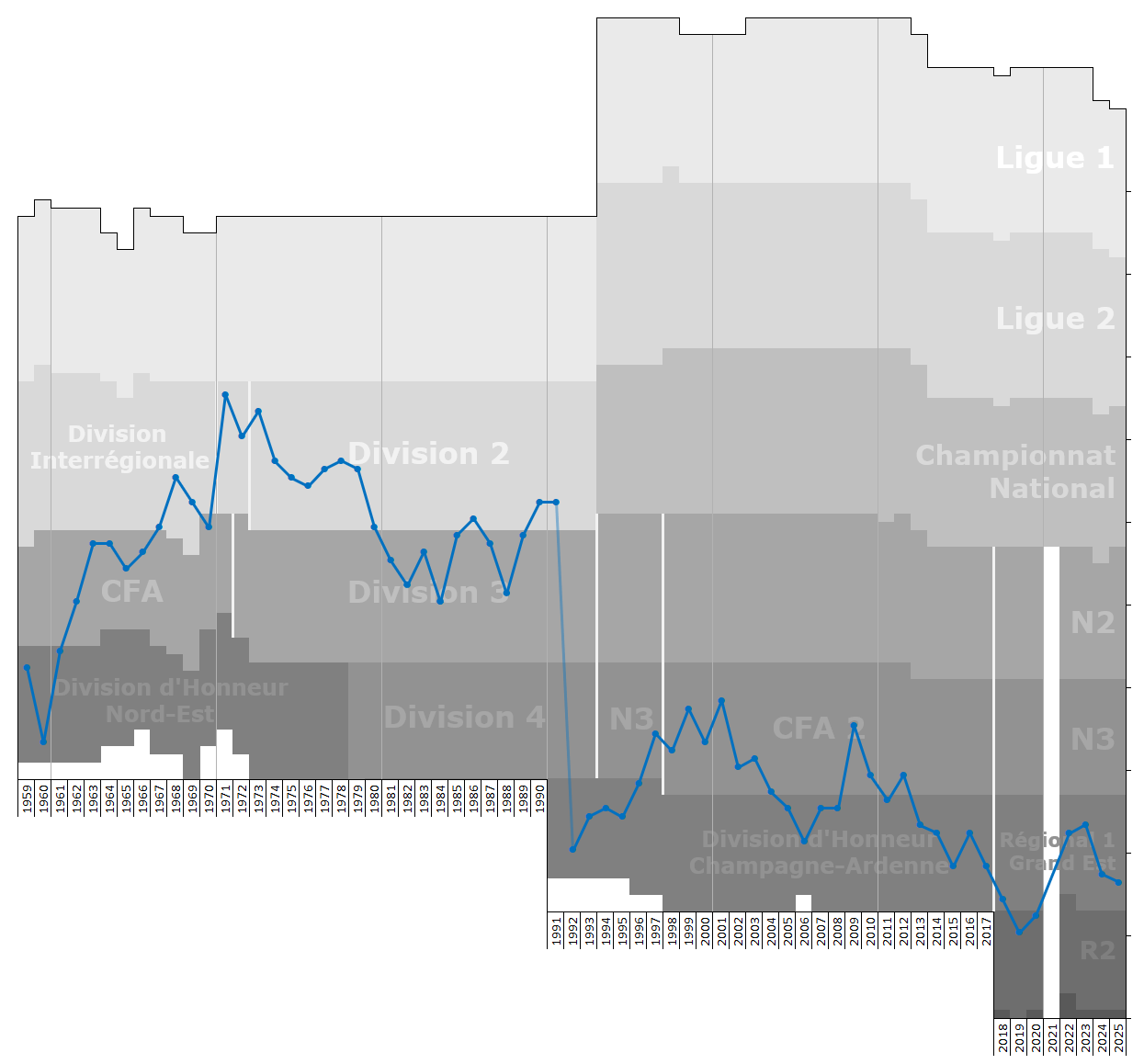
Historical league performance chart of Chaumont FC

== Honours ==
=== Domestic ===
List of prize
- Coupe de France
  - Thirty-second round: 1964, 1965, 1966, 1969, 1974, 1975, 1978, 1979, 1980, 1983, 1988, 1991
  - Round of 16: 1968, 1972, 1973, 1976, 1982, 1990
  - Eighth of a finalist : 1967, 1986
- Ligue 2
  - Runners-up group A : 1971
- Championnat National
  - Champions group Est : 1985, 1989
- Division 3 (1971-1993)
  - Runners-up : 1989
- Championnat de division d'honneur de Champagne-Ardenne
  - Champions : 1961, 1973, 1996, 2011
  - Runners-up : 2008
- Division d'Honneur regional Champagne-Ardenne
  - Champion group B : 2004
- Coupe de Champagne-Ardenne
  - Champions : 1977, 1978

== Management ==
=== Managerial history ===
Rang	Name	Dates
1	Pierre Flamion	01/07/1962 - 30/06/1968
2	Paul Lévin	01/07/1968 - 01/07/1969
3	Ludovic Maczka	01/07/1970 - 01/07/1974
4	Guy Nungesser	01/07/1971 - 01/07/1974
5	Daniel Druda	01/07/1974 - 01/07/1975
6	Daniel Fromholtz	01/07/1975 - 01/12/1982
7	Pierre Flamion	01/12/1982 - 30/06/1986
8	Moussa Bezaz	01/07/1987 - 01/07/1991
9	Guy Nungesser	01/07/1991 - 30/10/1991
10	Bernard Chaffaut	01/07/1990 - 01/07/1998
11	Bernard Chaffaut & Daniel Fromholtz	01/07/1998 - 01/07/2002
12	Stéphane Mazzolini	01/07/2002 - 16/06/2014
13	David Constant	16/06/2014 - 01/07/2018
14	Joël Matagne	01/07/2018 - ...

== Notable players ==
- François Heutte
- René Charrier
- Olivier Rouyer
- Moussa Bezaz
- Stéphane Mazzolini
- Jean-Paul Chenevotot
- François Czekaj
- Jean-Claude Blanchard
- Jean Davanne
- Daniel Druda
- Rosario Giannetta
- Souleymane Camara
- Fantamady Keita
