= Peter Obermeyer =

German football manager

Personal information
- Full name: Peter Obermeyer
- Date of birth: 19 June 1941
- Place of birth: Hannover, Germany
- Date of death: 29 May 2025 (aged 83)
- Place of death: Hannover, Germany
- Position: Left winger

Youth career
- Arminia Hannover

Senior career*
Years	Team	Apps	(Gls)
- Arminia Hannover
1970	Universidad Católica		

Managerial career
- TSV Hannover-Burgdorf
- 1993: Provincial Osorno
- 1993–1994: Hannover 96 (sporting director)
- 1994: Hannover 96
- * Club domestic league appearances and goals

Peter Obermeyer (19 June 1941 – 29 May 2025) was a German football manager and player. He worked as a coach, manager and advisor in 21 countries.

== Career ==
A left winger, Obermeyer was trained and started his career with Arminia Hannover. In 1970, he moved to Chile to represent Universidad Católica in the Primera División, becoming the first German player in Chilean football.

In 1993, Obermeyer assumed as head coach of traditional Chilean club Provincial Osorno. Back to Germany, Obermeyer assumed as the head coach of Hannover 96 in the 1994–95 2. Bundesliga while serving as the sporting director.

As a football coach, he also led TSV Hannover-Burgdorf. As an advisor, football teacher and coach, he also worked in countries such as Burma, Angola, Mozambique, Venezuela, Maldives, among others.

As an anecdote, Obermeyer suggested Hannover 96 the signing of Peruvian player Jefferson Farfán in 2004, who finally signed for PSV Eindhoven.

== Personal life and death ==
His younger brother, Frank, has served as director of Hannover 96's legends team.

Peter died on 29 May 2025, as a result of a fall down the stairs.
