= Jeremías Viale =

Argentine football manager

Personal information
- Full name: Jeremías Omar Viale Rodríguez
- Date of birth: 12 July 1983 (age 43)
- Place of birth: Arequito, Argentina

Senior career*
Years	Team	Apps	(Gls)
- Belgrano de Arequito
- Alumni de Casilda
- Casilda Club

Managerial career
- 2006–2007: CA Jorge Griffa (youth)
- 2008–2009: CA Jorge Griffa (fitness coach)
- 2010–2011: AA Jorge Griffa (youth)
- 2010–2011: AA Jorge Griffa
- 2012–2017: San Luis
- 2014: San Luis (caretaker)
- 2015: San Luis (caretaker)
- 2018: Deportes Limache
- 2019: Deportes Vallenar
- 2020–2021: Deportes Vallenar
- 2021: Deportes Colina
- 2023–2026: Brujas de Salamanca
- 2026: Provincial Osorno
- * Club domestic league appearances and goals

Jeremías Omar Viale Rodríguez (born 12 July 1983) is an Argentine football manager.

== Career ==
Born in Arequito, Argentina, Viale played football for local clubs Belgrano de Arequito, Alumni de Casilda and Casilda Club.

As a football coach, Viale started his career with Club Atlético Jorge Griffa and Asociación Atlética Jorge Griffa in his homeland.

In 2012, Viale moved to Chile to take in charge the San Luis de Quillota youth ranks. He also served as caretaker manager of the first team in both the Primera B and the Primera División.

Following San Luis, Viale led Deportes Limache, Deportes Vallenar twice, Deportes Colina and Brujas de Salamanca.

In February 2026, Viale assumed as manager of traditional Chilean club Provincial Osorno.
