= Diego Pezoa =

Chilean footballer

Personal information
- Full name: Diego Andrés Pezoa Matus
- Date of birth: 2 November 1993 (age 32)
- Place of birth: Molina, Chile
- Height: 1.64 m (5 ft 5 in)
- Position: Midfielder

Team information
- Current team: Provincial Osorno
- Number: 14

Youth career
- Magallanes

Senior career*
Years	Team	Apps	(Gls)
2011–2017	Magallanes	97	(13)
2017–2018	Curicó Unido	14	(0)
2018	→ Rangers (loan)	13	(2)
2019–2021	Rangers	46	(7)
2021–2023	Deportes Santa Cruz	54	(3)
2024–	Provincial Osorno	33	(2)
- * Club domestic league appearances and goals as of 8 January 2026

Diego Andrés Pezoa Matus (born 2 November 1993) is a Chilean footballer who plays as a midfielder for Provincial Osorno.

== Club career ==
Born in Molina, Chile, Pezoa is a product of Magallanes and played for them until 2017.

In May 2017, Pezoa signed a two-year contract with Curicó Unido in the Chilean Primera División. In the second half of 2018, he was loaned out to Rangers de Talca. In 2019, he continued with Rangers until the 2020 season.

In 2021, Pezoa joined Deportes Santa Cruz. At the beginning of the 2023 season, he suffered a serious ACL injury which kept him from the activity for the season.

In 2024, Pezoa signed with Provincial Osorno. In June 2025, he suffered another ACL injury.
