= Stéphane Mazzolini =

French association football player (born 1966)

Personal information
- Full name: Stéphane Mazzolini
- Date of birth: 28 November 1966 (age 59)
- Place of birth: Reims, France
- Height: 1.70 m (5 ft 7 in)
- Position: Defender

Youth career
- 1975–1981: Lunel
- 1981–1987: Auxerre

Senior career*
| Years | Team | Apps | (Gls) |
| 1987–1993 | Auxerre | 128 | (2) |
| 1993–1994 | Martigues | 17 | (1) |
| 1994–1996 | Marseille | 28 | (0) |
| 1996–1998 | AC Ajaccio | ? | (?) |
| 1998–2002 | Chaumont | ? | (?) |

International career
| | France U19 | ? | (?) |

Managerial career
- 2002–: Chaumont
- * Club domestic league appearances and goals

Stéphane Mazzolini (born 28 November 1966) is a French former association football player and now manager. During his playing days, he played as a defender. In his early career, he won caps for the France national under-19 football team. He retired from playing in 2002, and is currently the manager of Championnat de France amateur 2 club Chaumont.

Mazzolini was born in Reims, Marne and joined local junior football club Lunel in 1975, and played there for six years before he was spotted by AJ Auxerre in 1981, at the age of fourteen. After a number of seasons in the youths and reserves at the club, including the Auxerre reserves' Division 3 championship-winning season in 1985–86, Mazzolini was promoted to the first team at the start of the 1987–88 season. He made his Division 1 début for the club on 20 September 1987, in the 0–1 defeat away to RCF Paris. His first goal for Auxerre came in the 61st minute of the 2–0 victory over Sporting Toulon Var on 16 September 1989. In a total of six seasons with the club, he went on to play 128 times in the league, 17 games in the Coupe de France and 16 UEFA Cup matches.

He transferred to Division 1 rivals FC Martigues in 1993, but stayed with the club for only one season before moving to then Division 2 side Olympique de Marseille in the summer of 1994. In his first season with the side, Mazzolini played 20 league matches as Marseille claimed the Division 2 championship. However, after promotion to Division 1, he made just eight appearances the following season and signed for National 2 outfit AC Ajaccio at the end of the 1995–96 campaign.

He played for the Corsica outfit for the following two seasons, and was a part of the side that won promotion to the National 1 in 1996–97. In 1998, he moved into French non-league football when he was signed by Chaumont. He played for the club for four seasons before being appointed as manager of the Championnat de France amateur 2 Group C side in 2002.
