= Nicola Hadwa =

Chilean commercial engineer (born 1950)

Personal information
- Full name: Nicola Hadwa Shahwan
- Date of birth: 30 March 1950 (age 76)
- Place of birth: Beit Jala, Palestine
- Height: 1.73 m (5 ft 8 in)

Managerial career
- Years: Team
- Iván Mayo
- El Sol de Quilpué
- Quintero Unido
- Vicuña Elqui
- 2002: Deportes La Serena
- 2002–2004: Palestine
- 2004: Palestino
- 2005: Unión La Calera
- 2020: Concón National
- ‡ National team caps and goals as of 29 December 2020

Nicola Hadwa Shahwan (born 1950) is a Palestine–Chilean commercial engineer and football manager. He was the first professional coach of the Palestine national football team.

He has criticized US imperialism on TeleSur, HispanTV and Sputnik. He has participated in scholarly conferences sponsored by institutions including the University of Valparaíso, and on how emergent economies (especially China) have countered US weight around the world.

== Football career ==
In 2002, he was hired by Palestine Football Association to coach Palestine. According him, the reasons why that country's Football Association contacted him was because he was the first one professional coach in the history of Palestinian football.

In 2004, he renounced to Club Deportivo Palestino.

On 3 December 2020, Hadwa joined Concón National.

== Political career ==
In 2017, Hadwa launched a campaign to reach a seat in the Chamber of Deputies of Chile with the support of the Progressive Party then led by Marco Enríquez Ominami.
