= Palestine national football team =

Men's association football team

Palestine
- Nickname(s): أُسُودُ كَنْعَان, ʾUsūd Kanʿān (Lions of Canaan) الْفِدَائِيّ, al-Fidāʾī (The Fedayeen)
- Association: Palestinian Football Association (PFA)
- Confederation: AFC (Asia)
- Sub-confederation: WAFF (West Asia)
- Head coach: Ihab Abu Jazar
- Captain: Musab Al-Battat
- Most caps: Musab Al-Battat (83)
- Top scorer: Oday Dabbagh (21)
- Home stadium: Faisal Al-Husseini International Stadium
- FIFA code: PLE
| First colours | Second colours |

FIFA ranking
- Current: 92 (18 November 2026)
- Highest: 73 (February – March 2018)
- Lowest: 191 (April – August 1999)

First international
- Egypt 8–1 Palestine (Alexandria, Egypt; 1 August 1953)

Biggest win
- Palestine 11–0 Guam (Dhaka, Bangladesh; 1 April 2006)

Biggest defeat
- Lebanon 9–1 Palestine (Alexandria, Egypt; 8 August 1953)

Asian Cup
- Appearances: 4 (first in 2015)
- Best result: Round of 16 (2023)

AFC Challenge Cup
- Appearances: 3 (first in 2006)
- Best result: Champions (2014)

FIFA Arab Cup
- Appearances: 6 (first in 1966)
- Best result: Quarter-finals (2025)

WAFF Championship
- Appearances: 10 (first in 2000)
- Best result: Group stage (2000, 2002, 2004, 2007, 2008, 2010, 2012, 2014, 2019)
Medal record
Men's football
AFC Challenge Cup
| Gold medal – first place | 2014 Maldives | Team |
Arab Games
| Bronze medal – third place | 1999 Amman | Team |

The Palestine national football team (Arabic: منتخب فِلَسطِيْن لِكُرَّةُ الْقَدَم), governed by the Palestinian Football Association, represents Palestine in men's international football. The team is under the global jurisdiction of FIFA and is governed continentally by the Asian Football Confederation (AFC).

A football federation in Mandatory Palestine was founded in 1928 which, however, is not recognized by FIFA as a predecessor of the Palestine national team. Palestine first participated in international competition at the 1953 Arab Games and was admitted to FIFA in 1998, following the establishment of the Palestinian National Authority. The team won the 2014 AFC Challenge Cup, which qualified them for the 2015 AFC Asian Cup, marking their first appearance in the competition. Palestine also qualified for the 2019 AFC Asian Cup, their first through regular qualification. They have yet to qualify for the FIFA World Cup.

The Palestinian team is known by various nicknames, namely "Lions of Canaan" (Arabic: أُسُودُ كَنعَان) and "the Fedayeen" (Arabic: الْفَدَائِيُّون). Their main colours are red and white. The team reached an all-time high position of 73rd in the FIFA ranking in February 2018, after going on a 12-match unbeaten streak, from 29 March 2016 to 22 March 2018. Palestine's main venue is Faisal Al-Husseini International Stadium in Al-Ram, although they have been forced to play in neutral stadiums for home matches on numerous occasions.

== History ==
=== 1928–1946: Mandate-era antecedents ===
Under the British Mandate, Jewish sports leaders established the Palestine Football Association (PFA) in 1928, which gained FIFA affiliation in 1929. While initial PFA participation included a small number of Arab clubs alongside Jewish teams, its membership became virtually all Jewish by the mid-1930s. The Mandatory Palestine national team, which competed in the 1934 and 1938 World Cup qualifiers, fielded exclusively Jewish players. Following the establishment of the State of Israel in 1948, the PFA became the Israel Football Association.

Concurrently, the Arab Palestinian Sports Federation (APSF) was formed in 1931 due to concerns that the PFA did not represent Arab interests. The APSF fielded its own teams, playing its first match against the American University of Beirut that same year, before its activities dissolved toward the end of the decade due to the 1936–1939 Arab revolt.

In 1944, the APSF was re-established, and was recognized by countries such as Egypt, Syria, and Lebanon as the legitimate representative of Palestine. Despite recognition from these countries, the APSF was rejected FIFA membership in 1946.

=== 1953–1998: Establishment and regional participation ===
Palestine's first international matches were played at the 1953 Arab Games held in Egypt. Their first match was an 8–1 defeat to Egypt, and in their second match they lost to Libya 5–2. In the fifth-place match, Palestine lost 9–1 to Lebanon and finished the competition in sixth place.

At the 1965 Arab Games, Palestine were grouped with Aden, Iraq, Lebanon and the United Arab Republic. They finished second, advancing to the semi-finals for the first time. Palestine faced Sudan and were beaten 2–1. In the third place play-off, Palestine met Libya, where they lost 4–2.

Palestine participated in the 1966 Arab Cup held in Iraq; they were drawn in Group B alongside Syria, Libya and North Yemen. Starting with a 0–0 draw to Libya, Palestine beat North Yemen 7–0 before losing 3–1 to Syria. They ended the tournament with four points and failed to qualify to the knock-out stages of the competition.

During the 1970s, the national team was composed of Palestinian players from Lebanon, Iraq, Syria, Jordan, Kuwait, and Egypt, with the majority coming from Lebanon. The Palestine Cup of Nations was first held in 1972 in Iraq. The tournament was held twice more, in 1973 and 1975.

The national team participated in the 1976 Arab Games, held in Damascus. Palestine started their campaign with two defeats to Morocco (3–0) and Saudi Arabia (3–1), before defeating Jordan (2–1). They lost to hosts Syria (2–0) in their fourth game of the tournament, drew against South Yemen (0–0), and finished with a win against Mauritania (1–0) to end the tournament in 6th place. Palestine participated in the 1992 Arab Cup held in Syria; they were drawn in Group B alongside the hosts and Saudi Arabia but were eliminated from the group stage after one draw and one loss.

=== 1998–2014: FIFA recognition ===
In May 1995, the PFA was granted the status of provisional member in FIFA. Palestine eventually gained FIFA membership on 8 June 1998 after numerous attempts since 1946. Under Ricardo Carugati, Palestine played their first official matches in July 1998 against Lebanon, Jordan and Syria at the 1998 Arab Cup qualification.

In the next year, Palestine took part in the 1999 Arab Games held in Jordan. There, they won games against Qatar and the United Arab Emirates, drew with Libya and Syria, while only losing to hosts Jordan. Palestine finished in the third-place which is their best result to date. In their first ever Asian Cup qualification, Palestine was drawn into a five-team group with Jordan, Kazakhstan, Pakistan, and Qatar. A single victory 2–0 against Pakistan proved to be not enough to qualify as they lost 1–0 to Qatar, 5–1 to Jordan before finishing the campaign with a 2–0 defeat to Kazakhstan.

Managed by Mustafa Yacoub, Palestine drew into Group C of the 2002 World Cup qualification along with Hong Kong, Malaysia and Qatar. The team finished in second place. In the 2002 Arab Cup, Palestine crashed out of the group stage. Under Nicola Hadwa Shahwan, the team were drawn alongside Kuwait, Qatar and Singapore. Palestine finished last with two points.

After a failed Asian Cup qualifying campaign, the PFA hired Austrian coach Alfred Riedl to lead the team during the 2006 FIFA World Cup qualification. Palestine was included in a group with Uzbekistan, Iraq and Chinese Taipei. They won both games against Chinese Taipei, drew 2–2 with Iraq, however this was insufficient for Palestine to advance beyond the second round as they lost both fixtures versus Uzbekistan 3–0 apart from a 3–0 defeat at the hands of Iraq. Palestine took part in the inaugural AFC Challenge Cup held in Bangladesh. They were drawn alongside the host team, Cambodia and Guam. In the group stage, Palestine registered their biggest win ever, a 11–0 victory over Guam. Palestine advanced from Group C and met Kyrgyzstan in the quarter-finals. After playing a goal-lees first half, they were beaten with a last-gasp goal. In the summer of 2006, Palestine achieved its highest FIFA ranking at 115, placing them 16th in the Asian continent.

Managed by Azmi Nassar, Palestine were drawn with China national football team, Iraq and Singapore during the 2007 Asian Cup qualification. Palestine finished in the bottom with 4 points. They achieved their only win against Singapore 1–0.

In 2008, with the help of FIFA's goal program, the PFA built the Faisal Al-Husseini International Stadium, and on 26 October 2008. Palestine held a match at their home for the first time since they became a member of FIFA, a 1–1 draw with Jordan ahead of a crowd of over 7,000. Palestine entered the first round of 2010 World Cup qualification and were eliminated after only one match that finished 4–0 for Singapore. The second leg was not played as scheduled due to the Palestinian team being barred from traveling. However, the FIFA refused to reschedule the match and Palestine forfeited the game 3–0.

The 2010 AFC Challenge Cup qualifying draw put Palestine in Group C, with Afghanistan (later withdrew), Kyrgyzstan, and Nepal. They started the run with a goalless draw against hosts Nepal. The final game finished in a 1–1 draw with Kyrgyzstan to miss the chance of qualification on goal difference.

Palestine drew into group C with Jordan, Libya and Sudan for the 2011 Arab Games. They lost the opening match 4–1 to Jordan in Doha. The team improved in the second match against Libya which finished 1–1. The last game against Sudan was won by Palestine 2–0 to clinch the second-place berth in the tournament. At the semi-finals they lost 3–1 to Bahrain. The team completed their campaign with a 3–0 loss to Kuwait.

During the 2014 FIFA World Cup qualifiers, Palestine were drawn with Afghanistan in the first round. The first leg was won 2–0, while the second leg ended in a draw 1–1. On 3 July 2011, the first World Cup qualifying match played at home, Palestine took the lead with a long-range shot by Houssam Wadi. Palestine reached the second round to face Thailand. The first match was lost 1–0 in Buriram, while the second match resulted in Palestine's elimination.

The PFA chose not to renew Moussa Bezaz's contract after exiting the second round of the 2014 FIFA World Cup qualifying. Jamal Mahmoud, a former player and manager of Al-Wehdat, was announced as the national team manager in November 2011, after two disastrous friendly matches, without a permanent manager saw defeats against Indonesia and Iran 4–1 and 7–0, respectively. Palestine made history by playing and defeating their first UEFA rival Azerbaijan, on 2–0. The match was later registered as unofficial for unknown reasons.

Mahmoud later led the team in the 2012 AFC Challenge Cup. In the run-up, Palestine finished group play at the 2012 AFC Challenge Cup without conceding a goal after 2–0 wins over Nepal and Maldives alongside a 0–0 draw against Turkmenistan on the way to a semifinal exit at the hands of eventual champions North Korea. The third place play-off ended in a 4–3 loss against the Philippines. During the 2014 AFC Challenge Cup qualification, Palestine drew into Group D with Bangladesh, Nepal and the Northern Mariana Islands. They started with a hard win against Bangladesh 1–0. The next game ended in a 9–0 rout over the Northern Mariana Islands. The qualifiers finished in a goalless draw against Nepal to earn a second straight AFC Challenge Cup berth.

=== 2014–present: Asian Cup era ===

Palestine's starting line-up against the Philippines at the 2014 AFC Challenge Cup Final

The team ended up winning the 2014 AFC Challenge Cup by drawing only one of the 5 matches without conceding a goal. In the opening match, Palestine won against Kyrgyzstan with a last-gasp goal by Abdelhamid Abuhabib. In the next group game, they played against Myanmar and won 2–0. The ended the first round with a 0–0 draw against hosts Maldives. Palestine advanced as group winners to the semi-finals where they faced Afghanistan. The match ended in favor of the Palestinians with a 2–0 win. At the final, Palestine clinched the win over the Philippines with a lone goal scored by Ashraf Nu'man through a free-kick. The victory gave the Palestine team their first major trophy and guaranteed their participation in the next year's AFC Asian Cup. Following its 2014 AFC Challenge Cup win and qualification for the Asian Cup, Jamal Mahmoud resigned as national team manager citing differences with the Palestine Football Association.

Palestine was placed in Group D along with Japan, Jordan and Iraq in the 2015 AFC Asian Cup having lost all three group matches. They started their campaign with a 0–4 defeat by Japan. In the second game Palestine were beaten 1–5, with the opposing team ending the first half with a 3 goals lead. In the second half, Palestine scored their first ever Asian Cup goal by Jaka Ihbeisheh six minutes before the end. However, at this point they were eliminated. The participation ended with a 0–2 defeat to Iraq. After a disastrous performance in the 2015 AFC Asian Cup, the PFA appointed Olympic team manager Abdel Nasser Barakat as national team manager, who then decided not to pick several veteran players as the team moved to overhaul.

Palestine registered two 6–0 wins over Malaysia during 2018 World Cup qualifying. Those results, combined with a 0–0 draw at home to Saudi Arabia and the United Arab Emirates, placed Palestine close to qualification for the third round of Asian World Cup qualifiers. They were eliminated from the qualification following a 2–0 defeat to the UAE on 24 March 2016. They won their final FIFA World Cup qualification match at home 7–0 against Timor-Leste, five days later.

Although eliminated from the World Cup, Palestine advanced to the third round of the 2019 AFC Asian Cup qualification. Drawn with Oman, the Maldives and Bhutan, Palestine came second in the group with five wins and one defeat, and qualified to the 2019 AFC Asian Cup for the first time through regular qualification. Between February and March 2018, Palestine reached their best ever FIFA ranking of 73rd, thanks to an unprecedented 12-match unbeaten streak (between 29 March 2016 and 22 March 2018), winning eight and drawing four. In February 2018, Palestine achieved their best-ever FIFA ranking (73rd).

On 19 December 2017, Julio César Baldivieso was hired after Abdel Nasser Barakat was released. The hiring was widely criticized by Palestinian fans. On 22 April 2018, the PFA appointed Noureddine Ould Ali as head coach to lead the team in the next period. Palestine was crowned champion of the 2018 Bangabandhu Cup as an invited country to the tournament. In the road to the final, they topped their group with 6 points, defeating Tajikistan 2–0 before winning against Nepal 1–0 with a Khaled Salem header. In the semi-final Palestine knocked out Bangladesh 2–0 with the goals coming in each half. At the final, Palestine played Tajikistan for the second time. The match ended 0–0 in regular time, to be decided in a penalty shoot-out which Palestine won 4–3.

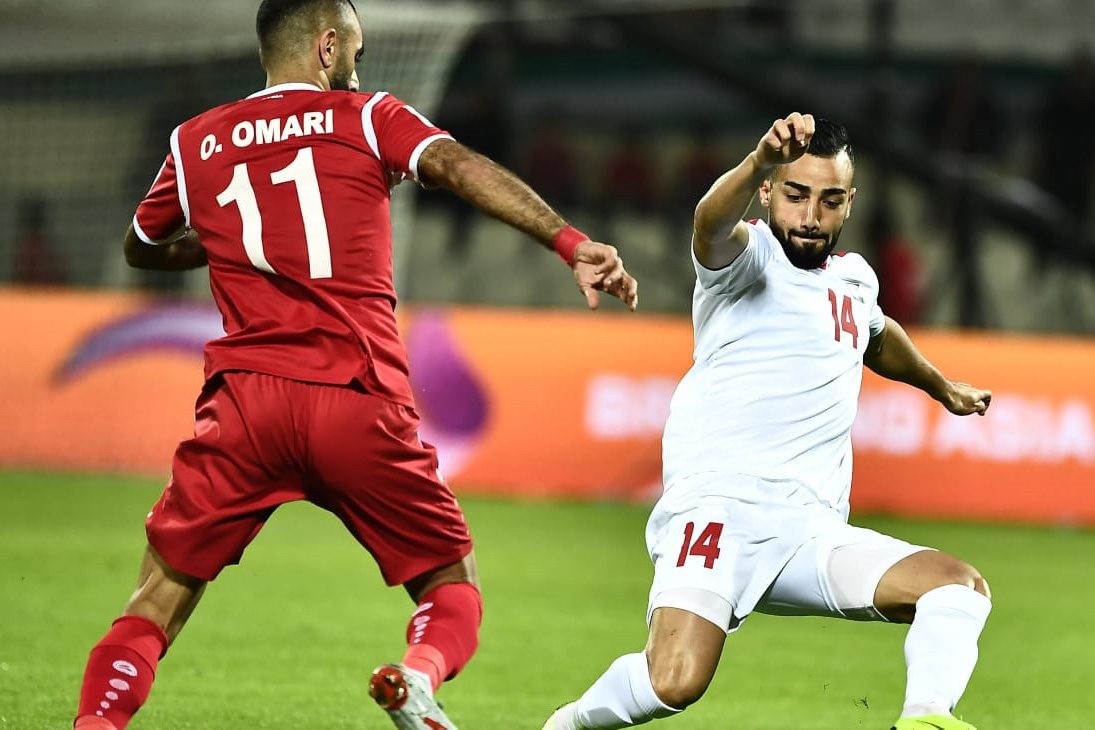
Palestinian defender Abdullah Jaber (right) against Syria at the 2019 Asian Cup

Drawn with Australia, Syria and Jordan, Palestine started their 2019 AFC Asian Cup campaign on 6 January 2019 with a 0–0 draw to Syria. Five days later, Palestine faced title-holders Australia; a header by Jamie Maclaren and a goal by Awer Mabil sent Palestine trailing 2–0 at half-time. Australia sealed the win with a 90th-minute header from Apostolos Giannou. On 15 January 2019, Palestine headed into their last group-stage match needing all three points against Jordan, and hoping for a Syria win against Australia. In the 17th minute, Palestine came close to scoring when Amer Shafi produced a fingertip save to keep out Abdelatif Bahdari. In the second half, Oday Dabbagh failed to score from two headers, and the match ended in a 0–0 draw.

Between July and August 2019, Palestine participated in the 2019 WAFF Championship; they were drawn with hosts Iraq, Syria, Lebanon, and Yemen. Palestine ended the tournament with two wins, one draw and one defeat, and finished in second place in their group: however, this wasn't enough to reach the final.

Palestine were drawn with Saudi Arabia, Singapore, Uzbekistan, Yemen at the 2022 World Cup qualification. They kicked-off with a historic win over Uzbekistan 2–0 in Al-Ram. Five days later, Palestine were defeated 2–1 to Singapore. On 15 October 2019, Palestine drew 0–0 with Saudi Arabia, during which its decades-long boycott of play in the West Bank came to an end in protest against Israel's control over Palestinian territories. Thereafter, the team lost again to Yemen 1–0. This was later followed with another away loss to Uzbekistan, thus placing Palestine in the bottom and reducing the country's opportunity to reach the final round.

Manager Noureddine Ould Ali lost his job after 2022 World Cup qualification resumed in 2021 following a 5–0 loss to Saudi Arabia. In April 2021, Tunisian coach Makram Daboub, who had previously worked as a goalkeeping coach under the leadership of Noureddine Ould Ali, who was dismissed, was assigned to supervise the national team on a temporary basis. Daboub led Palestine to victory over Singapore and Yemen. In June 2022, Palestine qualified for their third straight AFC Asian Cup finals, winning all three games against Mongolia, Yemen and Philippines.

On 23 January 2024, Palestine recorded their first ever Asian Cup victory and their first ever qualification to the Asian Cup knockout stage after a 3–0 victory over Hong Kong in the 2023 AFC Asian Cup. They ended up losing 1–2 to the hosts Qatar in the quarterfinal despite taking the lead through Oday Dabbagh's goal in the 37th minute.

On 7 June 2024, Palestine qualified to the Third Round of FIFA World Cup qualification for the first time after a 0–0 draw against Lebanon, securing second place in their qualification group behind Australia. This result also saw them qualify for the 2027 AFC Asian Cup, their fourth consecutive qualification to the tournament.

Palestine then recorded their first ever qualification to the Arab Cup knockout stage in 2025 but they lost the quarterfinal 2–1 against Saudi Arabia on 11 December 2025.

== Impact relating to the Israeli–Palestinian conflict ==
The Palestinian Football Association faces problems in training and playing due to the Israeli conflict with the Palestinians.

Because of travel restrictions placed by Israel upon people in the West Bank and Gaza Strip and the difficulty in obtaining an exit visa from Israel, many players in the team are drawn from the Palestinian diaspora, from as far away as Chile and the United States. Recently, Israel's refusal to issue exit visas has resulted in players, or in some case the entire team, being unable to represent the territories. In November 2006 all players based inside the West Bank and Gaza Strip were denied exit visas. The AFC cancelled the match since both teams had been eliminated from the competition by virtue of their previous results against China and Iraq.

In October 2007, the second leg of a crucial 2010 World Cup qualifier between Palestine and Singapore was not played due to Palestine's inability to obtain exit visas. The AFC and FIFA decided not to reschedule the match despite protests from the PFA, and Singapore was awarded a 3–0 forfeit for their actions. In May 2008, the team was not allowed to travel to the 2008 AFC Challenge Cup. After a 2011 World Cup qualifier against Thailand, two starters, Mohammed Samara and Majed Abusidu, were refused entry to the West Bank and therefore could not travel back with the team from Thailand.

Striker Ziyad Al-Kord was prevented from travelling and had his house destroyed. Tariq al Quto was killed by the Israel Defense Forces, and during the Gaza War (2008–2009), three Palestinian footballers, Ayman Alkurd, Shadi Sbakh, and Wajeh Moshtahe, were among the casualties.

Mahmoud Sarsak was administratively detained by Israel in July 2009 for being a member of the Islamic Jihad Movement in Palestine; following a hunger strike and international pressure on his behalf from FIFA president Sepp Blatter, he was released in July 2012. In April 2012, Olympic Team goalkeeper Omar Abu Ruways was arrested by Israel in connection with an attack on IDF soldiers.

Sameh Maraaba was arrested in April after returning with his team from training in Qatar. The Shin Bet accused Maraaba of exploiting his status as a Palestinian football player to act as a courier for Hamas. Shin Bet released a statement in which it contended that Maraaba admitted that, before he left for Qatar, he met a senior Hamas operative in Kalkilya, asked him to meet an operative from Hamas' military wing in Qatar and received money, a cellphone and written messages which he brought back to Kalkilya.

Palestinian facilities, such as the Palestine Stadium, have been damaged in military conflicts.

In addition, there have been reports of Israeli forces intentionally shooting Palestinian footballers in the knees and feet, including on one occasion ten bullets in the feet of 19 year old footballer Jawhar Nasser Jawhar.

In 2023, the team had to pull out of the Merdeka Tournament in Malaysia due to the Gaza war. Later that year, all 2026 FIFA World Cup qualification matches had to be held in neutral venues for the same reasons, though Algeria offered to host and was accepted by the PFA until FIFA and the AFC rejected the deal, stating that Palestine needed to play in AFC member venues, resulting in them going to Kuwait, Qatar, and other countries in the Islamic world.

In August 2025, the team relocated its base of operations to Chile due to the sizable Palestinian diaspora and distance from the Gaza war.

== Results and fixtures ==
As of 17 November 2026, the complete official match record of the Palestine national team comprises 277 matches: 77 wins, 77 draws and 123 losses. During these matches, the team scored 343 times and conceded 431 goals. Palestine's highest winning margin is 11 goals, which has been achieved against Guam in 2006 (11–0). Their longest winning streak is 7 wins, and their unbeaten record is 12 consecutive official matches.

The following is a list of match results in the last 12 months, as well as any future matches that have been scheduled.

Win Draw Loss Fixture Withdrew

=== 2025 ===
| 25 November 2025 Arab Cup qualifiers | Palestine | 0–0 (4–3 p) | Libya | Al Rayyan, Qatar |
| 19:00 UTC+3 | | Report | | Stadium: Al Gharafa Stadium; Referee: Mario Escobar (Guatemala) |
| | Penalties |
| | Dabbagh (penalty scored); Hamdan (penalty scored); Saleh (penalty scored); Termanini (penalty missed); Mahajna (penalty scored) | | (penalty missed) Youssef; (penalty scored) Ali; (penalty scored) Taktak; (penalty scored) Tajouri-Shradi; (penalty missed) Alhibeeshi |

| 1 December 2025 Arab Cup | Qatar | 0–1 | Palestine | Al Khor, Qatar |
| 18:45 UTC+3 | | Report | Al-Brake 90+5' (o.g.) | Stadium: Al Bayt Stadium; Attendance: 61,475; Referee: Glenn Nyberg (Sweden) |

| 4 December 2025 Arab Cup | Palestine | 2–2 | Tunisia | Lusail, Qatar |
| 17:30 UTC+3 | Hamdan 61'; Qunbar 85' | Report | Layouni 16'; Chaouat 51' | Stadium: Lusail Iconic Stadium; Attendance: 44,548; Referee: Ismail Elfath (United States) |

| 7 December 2025 Arab Cup | Syria | 0–0 | Palestine | Al Rayyan, Qatar |
| 20:00 UTC+3 | | Report | | Stadium: Education City Stadium; Attendance: 39,571; Referee: Ahmed Al-Kaf (Oman) |

| 11 December 2025 Arab Cup | Palestine | 1–2 (a.e.t.) | Saudi Arabia | Lusail, Qatar |
| 20:30 UTC+3 | Dabbagh 64' | Report | Al-Buraikan 58' (pen.); Kanno 115' | Stadium: Lusail Iconic Stadium; Attendance: 77,197; Referee: Amin Omar (Egypt) |

=== 2026 ===
| 6 June Friendly | Palestine | 0–0 | Kyrgyzstan | Bishkek, Kyrgyzstan |
| 20:30 UTC+6 | | Report | | Stadium: Dolen Omurzakov Stadium; Referee: Axrol Riskullayev (Uzbekistan) |

| 9 June Friendly | Kyrgyzstan | 0–0 | Palestine | Bishkek, Kyrgyzstan |
| 20:30 UTC+6 | | | | Stadium: Dolen Omurzakov Stadium; Referee: Rustam Lutfullin (Uzbekistan) |

| 24 September 2026 China Competition | Palestine | 2–2 | New Zealand | Chongqing, China |
| 17:30 UTC+8 | Al Hamlawi 27'; Dabbagh 39' | Report | Waine 5'; Randall 35' | Stadium: Tongliang Long Stadium; Attendance: 0 |

| 28 September 2026 China Competition | Tajikistan | 2–4 | Palestine | Chongqing, China |
| 20:00 UTC+8 | Boboev 4'; Babadjanov 24'; Dzhuraboyev (yellow card) (yellow-red card) 53' | Report | Al Hamlawi 21', 45'; Hassan 46'; Dabbagh 74' | Stadium: Tongliang Long Stadium; Attendance: 0 |

| 30 September Unofficial friendly | Konyaspor (Turkey) | 2–2 | Palestine B | Konya, Turkey |
| 20:00 UTC+3 | Me. İbrahimoğlu 2'; Mohamed 28' | Report | Sandouqa 12', 25' | Stadium: Konya Metropolitan Municipality Stadium; Attendance: 42,000 |
Note: Palestine played with their reserve team.

| 2 October 2026 China Competition | China | 0–5 | Palestine | Chongqing, China |
| 20:35 UTC+8 | | Report | Al Hamlawi 16', 22'; Dabbagh 45+5', 54'; Al-Qaq 90+3' | Stadium: Longxing Football Stadium; Referee: Asker Nazhafaliev (Uzbekistan) |

| 14 November 2026 Basra Tournament | Iran | 2–0 | Palestine | Basra, Iraq |
| 18:00 UTC+3 | Azmoun 76'; Hardani 84' | Report | | Stadium: Basra International Stadium; Referee: Mohanad Qasim Sarray (Iraq) |

| 17 November 2026 Basra Tournament | Palestine | 0–0 | Lebanon | Basra, Iraq |
| 16:00 UTC+3 | | Report | | Stadium: Basra International Stadium; Referee: Ahmed Kadhim Gatea (Iraq) |

== Coaching staff ==
| Position | Name |
|---|---|
| Head coach | (Palestine) Ihab Abu Jazar |
| Assistant coach | (Palestine) Fahed Attal |
| Team manager | (Palestine) Jaber Al-Fathy |
| Goalkeeping coach | (Palestine) Ala'a Omar-Ud-Din |
| Physiotherapists | (Palestine) Ahmed Al-Mutauween (Palestine) Ayub Salih |
| Team doctors | (Palestine) Bilal Hussein (Palestine) Abdallah Al-Nader |
| Masseur | (Palestine) Saeed Jaber |
| Team manager | (Palestine) Hamdallah Al-Mansour |
| Technical director | (Palestine) Abdalaziz Fathy |
| Head of delegation | (Palestine) Abdalhamid Al-Ghannoush |

=== Coaching history ===
- (Argentina) Ricardo Carugati (1998)
- (Palestine) Azmi Nassar (1999–2000)
- (Egypt) Mansour Hamid El Bouri (2000)
- (Egypt) Mustafa Abdel-Ghali Yacoub (2001)
- (Poland) Andrzej Wiśniewski (2002)
- (Chile) Nicola Hadwa (2002–2004)
- (Austria) Alfred Riedl (2004)
- (Hungary) Tamás Viczkó (2004)
- (Palestine) Azmi Nassar (2005–2007)
- (Chile) Nelson Mores Dekmak (2007)
- (Jordan) Ezzat Hamza (2008–2009)
- (Jordan) Jamal Daraghmeh (2009)
- (France) Mousa Bezaz (2009–2011)
- (Palestine) Abdel Nasser Barakat (2011, 2015–2017)
- (Jordan) Jamal Mahmoud (2011–2014)
- (Palestine) Saeb Jendeya (2014–2015)
- (Palestine) Ahmed Al-Hassan (2015)
- (Bolivia) Julio César Baldivieso (2017–2018)
- (Algeria) Noureddine Ould Ali (2018–2021)
- (Tunisia) Makram Daboub (2021–2024)
- (Palestine) Ihab Abu Jazar (2024–present)

== Players ==
=== Current squad ===
The following 23 players have been called up for the 2026 Basra International Tournament matches against Iran and Lebanon on 14 and 17 November 2026, respectively.

Caps and goals updated as of 17 November 2026, after the match against Lebanon.

| No. | Pos. | Player | Date of birth (age) | Caps | Goals | Club |
|---|---|---|---|---|---|---|
| 1 | GK | Abed Yassin | 9 May 2004 (age 22) | 3 | 0 | Unattached |
| 16 | GK | Mahdi Assi | 24 December 2004 (age 21) | 0 | 0 | (Syrian Football Association) Homs Al-Fidaa |
| 22 | GK | Rami Hamada | 24 March 1994 (age 32) | 68 | 0 | Unattached |
| 2 | DF | Maher Darwich | 16 March 2006 (age 20) | 1 | 0 | (Swiss Football Association) Grasshopper U21 |
| 3 | DF | Khalid Abu El Haija | 13 November 2005 (age 21) | 9 | 0 | (German Football Association) 1. FC Nürnberg |
| 4 | DF | Yaser Hamed | 9 December 1997 (age 28) | 35 | 5 | (Qatar Football Association) Al-Khor |
| 7 | DF | Musab Al-Battat (captain) | 12 November 1993 (age 33) | 84 | 1 | (Qatar Football Association) Al-Sailiya |
| 15 | DF | Milad Termanini | 8 May 1998 (age 28) | 36 | 2 | (Qatar Football Association) Al-Shamal |
| 17 | DF | Ali Rabaei | 9 October 2002 (age 24) | 1 | 0 | (Jordan Football Association) Shabab Al-Ordon |
| 20 | DF | Ameed Mahajna | 11 October 1996 (age 30) | 23 | 1 | (Qatar Football Association) Al-Arabi |
| 5 | MF | Ameed Sawafta | 10 July 2000 (age 26) | 16 | 0 | (Egyptian Football Association) Al-Masry |
| 8 | MF | Samer Zubaida | 26 April 2001 (age 25) | 1 | 0 | (Palestinian Football Association) Hilal Al-Quds |
| 14 | MF | Khaled Dader | 17 October 1998 (age 28) | 0 | 0 | (Syrian Football Association) Damascus Al-Ahli |
| 19 | MF | Agustín Manzur | 29 September 2000 (age 26) | 9 | 0 | (Paraguayan Football Association) Libertad |
| 23 | MF | Abdelhadi Rashid | 6 June 2005 (age 21) | 3 | 0 | (Egyptian Football Association) Petrojet |
| 27 | MF | Anas Bani Odeh | 6 September 2001 (age 25) | 2 | 0 | (Egyptian Football Association) Al-Mokawloon |
| 9 | FW | Assad Al Hamlawi | 27 October 2000 (age 26) | 8 | 5 | (Romanian Football Federation) Universitatea Craiova |
| 10 | FW | Khaled Al-Nabris | 27 March 2003 (age 23) | 12 | 0 | (Egyptian Football Association) Ceramica Cleopatra |
| 11 | FW | Oday Dabbagh | 3 December 1998 (age 27) | 59 | 21 | (Egyptian Football Association) Zamalek |
| 12 | FW | Bader Mousa | 11 April 1999 (age 27) | 14 | 0 | (Egyptian Football Association) Petrojet |
| 13 | FW | Ännäss Al Hamlawi | 8 August 2005 (age 21) | 1 | 0 | (Swedish Football Association) Hässleholms IF |
| 18 | FW | Ahmad Al-Qaq | 20 February 2002 (age 24) | 10 | 1 | (United States Soccer Federation) Sporting JAX |
| 21 | FW | Zaid Qunbar | 4 September 2002 (age 24) | 29 | 4 | (Kuwait Football Association) Al-Arabi |

=== Recent call-ups ===
The following players have been called up to the national team in the past 12 months but are not part of the current squad.

| Pos. | Player | Date of birth (age) | Caps | Goals | Club | Latest call-up |
|---|---|---|---|---|---|---|
| GK | Martín Aras | | 0 | 0 | (Chile) Palestino U18 | v. (Turkey) Konyaspor, 30 September 2026 |
| GK | Diogo Samara | 3 January 2007 (age 19) | 0 | 0 | (Brazil) Azuriz | v. (Turkey) Konyaspor, 30 September 2026 |
| GK | Hamza Fahid Sobhieh | 13 August 2009 (age 17) | 0 | 0 | (Norway) Stabæk U19 | v. (Turkey) Konyaspor, 30 September 2026 |
| DF | Wajdi Nabhan | 27 July 2001 (age 25) | 13 | 0 | (Egypt) ZED | v. Iran, 14 November 2026 ^{INJ} |
| DF | Emilio Saba | 26 March 2001 (age 25) | 3 | 0 | (Peru) Sport Boys | v. Iran, 14 November 2026 ^{INJ} |
| DF | Ahmed Taha | 6 June 2001 (age 25) | 11 | 0 | (Israel) Kafr Qasim | v. Iran, 14 November 2026 ^{WD} |
| DF | Zacarías Abuhadba | 20 July 2005 (age 21) | 0 | 0 | (Chile) Deportes Antofagasta | v. Iran, 14 November 2026 ^{WD} |
| DF | Jannis Zaydan | 7 May 2007 (age 19) | 0 | 0 | (Germany) Energie Cottbus | v. Iran, 14 November 2026 ^{WD} |
| DF | Brayan Dakhil | 25 September 2002 (age 24) | 1 | 0 | (Venezuela) Trujillanos | v. China, 2 October 2026 |
| DF | Omar Hasanain | 1 May 2004 (age 22) | 0 | 0 | (Jordan) Al-Salt | v. (Turkey) Konyaspor, 30 September 2026 |
| DF | Tamer Ibsais | 8 December 2005 (age 20) | 0 | 0 | (United States) Michigan Wolverines | v. (Turkey) Konyaspor, 30 September 2026 |
| DF | Abood Soboh | 20 July 2005 (age 21) | 0 | 0 | (Palestine) Jenin | v. (Turkey) Konyaspor, 30 September 2026 |
| DF | Mohammed Saleh | 18 July 1993 (age 33) | 43 | 0 | (Qatar) Al-Rayyan | v. Kyrgyzstan, 9 June 2026 |
| DF | Sultan Abu Daken | 23 February 1999 (age 27) | 0 | 0 | (United Arab Emirates) Dubai United | v. Kyrgyzstan, 9 June 2026 |
| MF | Oday Kharoub | 5 February 1993 (age 33) | 47 | 1 | (Jordan) Al-Baqa'a | v. Iran, 14 November 2026 ^{INJ} |
| MF | Adam Kaied | 2 March 2002 (age 24) | 8 | 0 | (Egypt) Zamalek | v. Iran, 14 November 2026 ^{INJ} |
| MF | Adam Ahmad | 25 June 2003 (age 23) | 1 | 0 | (Denmark) Esbjerg fB | v. Iran, 14 November 2026 ^{INJ} |
| MF | Ayham Shhade | 15 December 2000 (age 25) | 3 | 0 | (Bosnia and Herzegovina) Velež Mostar | v. Iran, 14 November 2026 ^{WD} |
| MF | Felipe Massri | 18 February 2002 (age 24) | 1 | 0 | (Chile) Unión Española | v. Iran, 14 November 2026 ^{WD} |
| MF | Hamed Hamdan | 3 October 2000 (age 26) | 14 | 1 | (Egypt) Pyramids | v. China, 2 October 2026 |
| MF | Rakan Abu Jora | 16 February 2005 (age 21) | 0 | 0 | (Palestine) Shabab Al-Ubeidiya | v. (Turkey) Konyaspor, 30 September 2026 |
| MF | Tareq Awawdeh | 24 July 2006 (age 20) | 0 | 0 | Free agent | v. (Turkey) Konyaspor, 30 September 2026 |
| MF | Omar Badarneh | 30 April 2007 (age 19) | 0 | 0 | (Austria) Rapid Wien II | v. (Turkey) Konyaspor, 30 September 2026 |
| MF | Mohammad Fa'our | 30 October 2005 (age 21) | 0 | 0 | (Palestine) Markaz Balata | v. (Turkey) Konyaspor, 30 September 2026 |
| MF | Bakir Mahmoud | 7 January 2008 (age 18) | 0 | 0 | (Germany) Rot-Weiss Essen U19 | v. (Turkey) Konyaspor, 30 September 2026 |
| MF | Musab Mubarak | 30 August 2007 (age 19) | 0 | 0 | (Jordan) Etihad Club U19 | v. (Turkey) Konyaspor, 30 September 2026 |
| MF | Machur Yunes | 3 September 2006 (age 20) | 0 | 0 | (Chile) Palestino U20 | v. (Turkey) Konyaspor, 30 September 2026 |
| MF | Mohammad Zoghayyer | 2 January 2006 (age 20) | 0 | 0 | (Palestine) Ahli Al-Khaleel | v. (Turkey) Konyaspor, 30 September 2026 |
| MF | Moustafa Zeidan | 7 June 1998 (age 28) | 9 | 0 | (Egypt) Al-Masry | v. Kyrgyzstan, 9 June 2026 |
| MF | Abada Baroud | 2003 (age 22–23) | 1 | 0 | (Saudi Arabia) Ohod | v. Kyrgyzstan, 9 June 2026 |
| MF | Mahmoud Abu Warda | 31 May 1995 (age 31) | 44 | 3 | (Jordan) Al-Wehdat | v. Saudi Arabia, 11 December 2025 |
| MF | Hamza Hussein | 2 May 2002 (age 24) | 1 | 0 | (Lebanon) Al-Ahed | v. Libya, 25 November 2025 |
| FW | Alaa Aldeen Hassan | 31 January 2000 (age 26) | 10 | 1 | (Qatar) Al-Gharafa | v. Iran, 14 November 2026 ^{INJ} |
| FW | Hadi Dawkar | 28 June 2004 (age 22) | 0 | 0 | (Lebanon) Shabab Sahel | v. Iran, 14 November 2026 ^{INJ} |
| FW | Omar Faraj | 9 March 2002 (age 24) | 6 | 0 | (Sweden) Halmstad | v. Iran, 14 November 2026 ^{WD} |
| FW | Tamer Seyam | 25 November 1992 (age 33) | 78 | 15 | (Qatar) Al-Shamal | v. China, 2 October 2026 |
| FW | Aysam Daraghmeh | 10 September 2005 (age 21) | 0 | 0 | (Palestine) Tubas | v. (Turkey) Konyaspor, 30 September 2026 |
| FW | Mohammed Direya | 2 July 2001 (age 25) | 0 | 0 | Free agent | v. (Turkey) Konyaspor, 30 September 2026 |
| FW | Mohammad Ali Jaafreh | 1 January 2005 (age 21) | 0 | 0 | (Libya) Al-Tasamuh Germa | v. (Turkey) Konyaspor, 30 September 2026 |
| FW | Mohammed Sandouqa | 5 April 2003 (age 23) | 0 | 0 | (Egypt) Al-Mokawloon | v. (Turkey) Konyaspor, 30 September 2026 |
| FW | Mohamad Hebous | 25 July 2001 (age 25) | 1 | 0 | (Lebanon) Jwaya | v. New Zealand, 24 September 2026 ^{INJ} |
| FW | Mohammed Balah | 4 September 1993 (age 33) | 10 | 1 | (Lebanon) Al-Ahed | v. Kyrgyzstan, 9 June 2026 |
| FW | Gianni Touma | 11 May 1999 (age 27) | 2 | 0 | (Syria) Homs Al-Fidaa | v. Kyrgyzstan, 9 June 2026 |
Notes: ^{WD} = Player withdrew from the squad due to non-injury issue.; ^{INJ} = Withdrew due to injury

== Player records ==
As of 2 October 2026
Players in bold are still active with Palestine.

=== Most appearances ===
| Rank | Player | Caps | Goals | Career |
|---|---|---|---|---|
| 1 | **Musab Al-Battat** | 82 | 1 | 2013–present |
| 2 | Abdelatif Bahdari | 80 | 9 | 2007–2021 |
| 3 | **Tamer Seyam** | 78 | 15 | 2014–present |
| 4 | Ramzi Saleh | 68 | 0 | 2000–2015 |
| 5 | **Rami Hamadeh** | 67 | 0 | 2017–present |
| 6 | Khader Yousef | 64 | 2 | 2008–2016 |
| 7 | Abdallah Jaber | 59 | 2 | 2014–2019 |
| 8 | Ashraf Nu'man | 58 | 16 | 2009–2016 |
| 9 | Hussam Abu Saleh | 55 | 4 | 2010–2015 |
| 10 | **Oday Dabbagh** | 59 | 21 | 2018–present |
| 10 | Saeb Jendeya | 52 | 0 | 1997–2008 |

=== Top goalscorers ===
| Rank | Player | Goals | Caps | Ratio | Career |
|---|---|---|---|---|---|
| 1 | **Oday Dabbagh** | 21 | 59 | 0.33 | 2018–present |
| 2 | Ashraf Nu'man | 16 | 58 | 0.28 | 2009–2016 |
| 3 | Fahed Attal | 15 | 42 | 0.36 | 2004–2012 |
| 3 | **Tamer Seyam** | 15 | 76 | 0.2 | 2014–present |
| 5 | Sameh Maraaba | 12 | 43 | 0.28 | 2014–2023 |
| 6 | Ziyad Al-Kord | 10 | 29 | 0.34 | 1997–2006 |
| 6 | **Jonathan Cantillana** | 10 | 36 | 0.28 | 2015–present |
| 8 | Abdelatif Bahdari | 9 | 82 | 0.11 | 2007–2021 |
| 9 | Ahmad Maher Wridat | 8 | 29 | 0.28 | 2011–2018 |
| 10 | Yashir Islame | 7 | 20 | 0.35 | 2016–2019 |

== Competitive record ==
Overview
| Competition | 1st place, gold medalist(s) | 2nd place, silver medalist(s) | 3rd place, bronze medalist(s) | Total |
|---|---|---|---|---|
| World Cup | 0 | 0 | 0 | 0 |
| Asian Cup | 0 | 0 | 0 | 0 |
| AFC Challenge Cup | 1 | 0 | 0 | 1 |
| Arab Cup | 0 | 0 | 0 | 0 |
| WAFF Championship | 0 | 0 | 0 | 0 |
| Arab Games | 0 | 0 | 1 | 1 |
| Asian Games | 0 | 0 | 0 | 0 |
| Total | 1 | 0 | 1 | 2 |

=== FIFA World Cup ===
| FIFA World Cup record | | | | | | | | | | Qualification record | | | | | | |
| Year | Round | Pos | Pld | W | D | L | GF | GA | Squad | Outcome | Pld | W | D | L | GF | GA |
|---|---|---|---|---|---|---|---|---|---|---|---|---|---|---|---|---|
| (Uruguay) 1930 to (France) 1998 | Not a FIFA member | | | | | | | | | Not a FIFA member | | | | | | |
| (South Korea) (Japan) 2002 | Did not qualify | | | | | | | | | 2nd | 6 | 2 | 1 | 3 | 8 | 9 |
| (Germany) 2006 | Did not qualify | | | | | | | | | 3rd | 6 | 2 | 1 | 3 | 11 | 11 |
| (South Africa) 2010 | Did not qualify | | | | | | | | | 1st round | 2 | 0 | 0 | 2 | 0 | 7 |
| (Brazil) 2014 | Did not qualify | | | | | | | | | 2nd round | 4 | 1 | 2 | 1 | 5 | 4 |
| (Russia) 2018 | Did not qualify | | | | | | | | | 3rd | 8 | 4 | 2 | 2 | 24 | 5 |
| (Qatar) 2022 | Did not qualify | | | | | | | | | 3rd | 8 | 3 | 1 | 4 | 10 | 10 |
| (Canada) (Mexico) (United States) 2026 | Did not qualify | | | | | | | | | 3rd round | 16 | 4 | 6 | 6 | 16 | 19 |
| (Morocco) (Portugal) (Spain) 2030 | To be determined | | | | | | | | | To be determined | | | | | | |
| (Saudi Arabia) 2034 | To be determined | | | | | | | | | To be determined | | | | | | |
| Total | Best: N/A | 0/7 | 0 | 0 | 0 | 0 | 0 | 0 | — | Total | 50 | 16 | 13 | 21 | 74 | 65 |
| Champions Runners-up Third place / Home venue | | | | | | | | | | | | | | | | |

=== AFC Asian Cup ===
| AFC Asian Cup record | | | | | | | | | | Qualification record | | | | | | |
| Year | Round | Pos | Pld | W | D | L | GF | GA | Squad | Outcome | Pld | W | D | L | GF | GA |
|---|---|---|---|---|---|---|---|---|---|---|---|---|---|---|---|---|
| (Hong Kong) 1956 to (United Arab Emirates) 1996 | Not an AFC member | | | | | | | | | Not an AFC member | | | | | | |
| (Lebanon) 2000 | Did not qualify | | | | | | | | | 4th | 4 | 1 | 0 | 3 | 3 | 8 |
| (China) 2004 | Did not qualify | | | | | | | | | 4th | 6 | 0 | 2 | 4 | 3 | 11 |
| (Indonesia) (Malaysia) (Thailand) (Vietnam) 2007 | Did not qualify | | | | | | | | | 4th | 5 | 1 | 1 | 3 | 3 | 9 |
| (Qatar) 2011 | Did not qualify | | | | | | | | | AFC Challenge Cup | | | | | | |
| (Australia) 2015 | Group stage | 16th | 3 | 0 | 0 | 3 | 1 | 11 | Squad | AFC Challenge Cup | | | | | | |
| (United Arab Emirates) 2019 | Group stage | 18th | 3 | 0 | 2 | 1 | 0 | 3 | Squad | 2nd | 14 | 9 | 2 | 3 | 49 | 8 |
| (Qatar) 2023 | Round of 16 | 14th | 4 | 1 | 1 | 2 | 6 | 7 | Squad | 1st | 11 | 6 | 1 | 4 | 20 | 10 |
| (Saudi Arabia) 2027 | Qualified | | | | | | | | | 2nd | 6 | 2 | 2 | 2 | 6 | 6 |
| Total | Best: Round of 16 | 4/19 | 10 | 1 | 3 | 6 | 7 | 21 | — | Total | 46 | 19 | 8 | 19 | 84 | 52 |
| Champions Runners-up Third place/semi-finalists / Home venue | | | | | | | | | | | | | | | | |

AFC Asian Cup history
| Year | Round | Date | Opponent | Result | Stadium |
|---|---|---|---|---|---|
| (Australia) 2015 | Group stage | 12 January | Japan | L 0–4 | Newcastle Stadium, Newcastle |
| (Australia) 2015 | Group stage | 16 January | Jordan | L 1–5 | Melbourne Rectangular Stadium, Melbourne |
| (Australia) 2015 | Group stage | 20 January | Iraq | L 0–2 | Canberra Stadium, Canberra |
| (United Arab Emirates) 2019 | Group stage | 6 January | Syria | D 0–0 | Sharjah Stadium, Sharjah |
| (United Arab Emirates) 2019 | Group stage | 11 January | Australia | L 0–3 | Rashid Stadium, Dubai |
| (United Arab Emirates) 2019 | Group stage | 15 January | Jordan | D 0–0 | Mohammed bin Zayed Stadium, Abu Dhabi |
| (Qatar) 2023 | Group stage | 6 January | Iran | L 1–4 | Education City Stadium, Al Rayyan |
| (Qatar) 2023 | Group stage | 11 January | United Arab Emirates | D 1–1 | Al Janoub Stadium, Al Wakrah |
| (Qatar) 2023 | Group stage | 15 January | Hong Kong | W 3–0 | Abdullah bin Khalifa Stadium, Al Rayyan |
| (Qatar) 2023 | Round of 16 | 29 January | Qatar | L 1–2 | Al Bayt Stadium, Al Khor |

=== AFC Challenge Cup ===
| AFC Challenge Cup record | | | | | | | | | | Qualification record | | | | | | |
| Year | Round | Pos | Pld | W | D | L | GF | GA | Squad | Outcome | Pld | W | D | L | GF | GA |
|---|---|---|---|---|---|---|---|---|---|---|---|---|---|---|---|---|
| (Bangladesh) 2006 | Quarter-finals | 5th of 16 | 4 | 2 | 1 | 1 | 16 | 2 | Squad | Qualified as invitees | | | | | | |
| (India) 2008 | Withdrew | | | | | | | | | Withdrew | | | | | | |
| (Sri Lanka) 2010 | Did not qualify | | | | | | | | | 3rd of 3 | 2 | 0 | 2 | 0 | 1 | 1 |
| (Nepal) 2012 | Fourth place | 4th of 8 | 5 | 2 | 1 | 2 | 7 | 6 | Squad | 1st of 4 | 3 | 2 | 1 | 0 | 5 | 1 |
| (Maldives) 2014 | Champions | 1st of 8 | 5 | 4 | 1 | 0 | 6 | 0 | Squad | 1st of 4 | 3 | 2 | 1 | 0 | 10 | 0 |
| Total | Best: champions | 3/5 | 14 | 8 | 3 | 3 | 29 | 8 | — | Total | 8 | 4 | 4 | 0 | 16 | 2 |
| Champions Runners-up Third place / Home venue | | | | | | | | | | | | | | | | |

=== WAFF Championship ===
Palestine's WAFF Championship record
| Host nation(s) and year | Round | Pos | Pld | W | D | L | GF | GA | Squad |
|---|---|---|---|---|---|---|---|---|---|
| (Jordan) 2000 | Group stage | 7th of 8 | 3 | 0 | 1 | 2 | 3 | 5 | Squad |
| (Syria) 2002 | Group stage | 5th of 6 | 2 | 0 | 0 | 2 | 1 | 4 | Squad |
| (Iran) 2004 | Group stage | 5th of 6 | 2 | 0 | 1 | 1 | 2 | 3 | Squad |
| (Jordan) 2007 | Group stage | 5th of 6 | 2 | 0 | 0 | 2 | 0 | 3 | Squad |
| (Iran) 2008 | Group stage | 6th of 6 | 2 | 0 | 0 | 2 | 0 | 4 | Squad |
| (Jordan) 2010 | Group stage | 9th of 9 | 2 | 0 | 0 | 2 | 1 | 6 | Squad |
| (Kuwait) 2012 | Group stage | 8th of 12 | 3 | 1 | 0 | 2 | 3 | 4 | Squad |
| (Qatar) 2014 | Group stage | 7th of 9 | 2 | 0 | 1 | 1 | 0 | 1 | Squad |
| (Iraq) 2019 | Group stage | 3rd of 9 | 4 | 2 | 1 | 1 | 6 | 5 | Squad |
| (United Arab Emirates) 2026 | Qualified as invitees | | | | | | | | |
| Total | Best: group stage | 10/10 | 22 | 3 | 4 | 15 | 16 | 35 | — |
Champions Runners-up Third place/semi-finalists / Home venue

=== FIFA Arab Cup ===
| FIFA Arab Cup record | | | | | | | | | Qualification record | | | | | | |
| Year | Round | Pos | Pld | W | D | L | GF | GA | Outcome | Pld | W | D | L | GF | GA |
|---|---|---|---|---|---|---|---|---|---|---|---|---|---|---|---|
| (Lebanon) 1963 and (Kuwait) 1964 | Did not participate | | | | | | | | Did not participate | | | | | | |
| (Iraq) 1966 | Group stage | 5th of 9 | 3 | 1 | 1 | 1 | 8 | 3 | No qualification | | | | | | |
| (Saudi Arabia) 1985 | Did not participate | | | | | | | | Did not participate | | | | | | |
| (Jordan) 1988 | Did not qualify | | | | | | | | 3rd of 3 | 2 | 0 | 1 | 1 | 0 | 3 |
| (Syria) 1992 | Group stage | 5th of 6 | 2 | 0 | 1 | 1 | 1 | 2 | No qualification | | | | | | |
| (Qatar) 1998 | Did not qualify | | | | | | | | 4th of 4 | 3 | 0 | 1 | 2 | 3 | 6 |
| (Kuwait) 2002 | Group stage | 9th of 10 | 4 | 0 | 3 | 1 | 7 | 9 | No qualification | | | | | | |
| (Saudi Arabia) 2012 | Group stage | 9th of 10 | 2 | 0 | 1 | 1 | 2 | 4 | No qualification | | | | | | |
| (Qatar) 2021 | Group stage | 15th of 16 | 3 | 0 | 1 | 2 | 2 | 10 | 1st of 2 | 1 | 1 | 0 | 0 | 5 | 1 |
| (Qatar) 2025 | Quarter-finals | 7th of 16 | 4 | 1 | 2 | 1 | 4 | 4 | P/O winner | 1 | 0 | 1 | 0 | 0 | 0 |
| Total | Best: Quarter-finals | 6/10 | 18 | 2 | 9 | 7 | 24 | 32 | Total | 5 | 1 | 2 | 2 | 8 | 7 |
| Champions Runners-up Third place / Home venue | | | | | | | | | | | | | | | |

=== Arab Games ===
Palestine's Arab Games record
| Year | Round | Pos | Pld | W | D | L | GF | GA | Squad |
|---|---|---|---|---|---|---|---|---|---|
| (Egypt) Alexandria 1953 | Group stage | 6th of 6 | 2 | 0 | 0 | 2 | 3 | 13 | Squad |
| (Lebanon) Beirut 1957 | Did not participate | | | | | | | | |
| (Morocco) Casablanca 1961 | Did not participate | | | | | | | | |
| (United Arab Republic) Cairo 1965 | Fourth place | 4th of 10 | 6 | 2 | 1 | 3 | 7 | 9 | Squad |
| (Syria) Damascus 1976 | Final group | 6th of 7 | 6 | 2 | 1 | 3 | 4 | 9 | Squad |
| (Morocco) Rabat 1985 | Did not participate | | | | | | | | |
| (Syria) Aleppo 1992 | Group stage | 5th of 6 | 2 | 0 | 1 | 1 | 1 | 2 | Squad |
| (Lebanon) Beirut 1997 | Did not participate | | | | | | | | |
| (Jordan) Amman 1999 | Third place | 3rd of 11 | 6 | 2 | 2 | 2 | 6 | 9 | Squad |
| (Egypt) Cairo 2007 | Did not participate | | | | | | | | |
| (Qatar) Doha 2011 | Fourth place | 4th of 12 | 5 | 1 | 1 | 3 | 5 | 11 | Squad |
| Total | Best: third place | 6/11 | 27 | 7 | 6 | 14 | 26 | 55 | — |
Champions Runners-up Third place / Home venue

=== Asian Games ===
Asian Games record
| Year | Round | Pos | Pld | W | D | L | GF | GA | Squad |
|---|---|---|---|---|---|---|---|---|---|
| (India) New Delhi 1951 | Did not enter | | | | | | | | |
| (Philippines) Manila 1954 | Did not enter | | | | | | | | |
| (Japan) Tokyo 1958 | Did not enter | | | | | | | | |
| (Indonesia) Jakarta 1962 | Did not enter | | | | | | | | |
| (Thailand) Bangkok 1966 | Did not enter | | | | | | | | |
| (Thailand) Bangkok 1970 | Did not enter | | | | | | | | |
| (Iran) Tehran 1974 | Did not enter | | | | | | | | |
| (Thailand) Bangkok 1978 | Did not enter | | | | | | | | |
| (India) New Delhi 1982 | Did not enter | | | | | | | | |
| (South Korea) Seoul 1986 | Did not enter | | | | | | | | |
| (China) Beijing 1990 | Did not enter | | | | | | | | |
| (Japan) Hiroshima 1994 | Withdrew | | | | | | | | |
| (Thailand) Bangkok 1998 | Did not enter | | | | | | | | |
| 2002 to present | See Palestine national under-23 football team | | | | | | | | |
| Total | Best: N/A | 0/13 | 0 | 0 | 0 | 0 | 0 | 0 | — |
Gold Silver Bronze / Home venue

=== Other tournaments ===
| Tournament | Round | Ref |
|---|---|---|
| (Bangladesh) 2018 Bangabandhu Cup | Winners | |
| (Bangladesh) 2020 Bangabandhu Cup | Winners | |
| (Iraq) 2026 Basra Tournament | Fourth place | |

== Head-to-head record ==
The list shown below shows the Palestine national football team all-time international record against opposing nations.

Positive record Neutral record Negative record

All friendly and international matches have been approved.

Palestine national football team head-to-head records
| Opponent | From | To | Pld | W | D | L | GF | GA | GD | Win % |
|---|---|---|---|---|---|---|---|---|---|---|
| Afghanistan | 2011 | 2018 | 4 | 2 | 2 | 0 | 5 | 1 | +4 | 50.00 |
| Algeria | 1969 | 2005 | 3 | 0 | 0 | 3 | 0 | 7 | −7 | 0.00 |
| Australia | 2019 | 2023 | 3 | 0 | 0 | 3 | 0 | 9 | −9 | 0.00 |
| Azerbaijan | 2012 | 2012 | 1 | 1 | 0 | 0 | 2 | 0 | +2 | 100.00 |
| Bahrain | 2004 | 2023 | 8 | 4 | 1 | 3 | 8 | 7 | +1 | 50.00 |
| Bangladesh | 2006 | 2024 | 8 | 7 | 1 | 0 | 16 | 1 | +15 | 87.50 |
| Bhutan | 2017 | 2017 | 2 | 2 | 0 | 0 | 12 | 0 | +12 | 100.00 |
| Burundi | 2020 | 2020 | 1 | 1 | 0 | 0 | 3 | 1 | +2 | 100.00 |
| Cambodia | 1966 | 2006 | 2 | 1 | 0 | 1 | 4 | 4 | +0 | 50.00 |
| Chile | 2002 | 2002 | 1 | 0 | 0 | 1 | 1 | 3 | −2 | 0.00 |
| China | 2006 | 2026 | 7 | 1 | 2 | 4 | 7 | 10 | −3 | 14.29 |
| Chinese Taipei | 2004 | 2014 | 3 | 3 | 0 | 0 | 16 | 3 | +13 | 100.00 |
| Comoros | 2021 | 2021 | 1 | 1 | 0 | 0 | 5 | 1 | +4 | 100.00 |
| Egypt | 1953 | 1973 | 3 | 0 | 0 | 3 | 4 | 23 | −19 | 0.00 |
| Guam | 2006 | 2006 | 1 | 1 | 0 | 0 | 11 | 0 | +11 | 100.00 |
| Hong Kong | 2001 | 2024 | 3 | 2 | 1 | 0 | 5 | 1 | +4 | 66.67 |
| India | 2013 | 2014 | 2 | 2 | 0 | 0 | 7 | 4 | +3 | 100.00 |
| Indonesia | 2011 | 2023 | 3 | 1 | 1 | 1 | 3 | 5 | −2 | 33.33 |
| Iraq | 1965 | 2025 | 19 | 1 | 4 | 14 | 9 | 40 | −31 | 5.26 |
| Iran | 2000 | 2026 | 7 | 0 | 2 | 5 | 3 | 20 | −17 | 0.00 |
| Jordan | 1976 | 2025 | 17 | 1 | 6 | 10 | 14 | 45 | −31 | 5.88 |
| Japan | 2015 | 2015 | 1 | 0 | 0 | 1 | 0 | 4 | −4 | 0.00 |
| Kazakhstan | 2000 | 2000 | 2 | 0 | 0 | 2 | 2 | 5 | −3 | 0.00 |
| Kuwait | 2002 | 2025 | 11 | 2 | 2 | 7 | 11 | 22 | −11 | 18.18 |
| Kyrgyzstan | 2006 | 2026 | 9 | 1 | 5 | 3 | 6 | 8 | −2 | 11.11 |
| Lebanon | 1953 | 2024 | 11 | 2 | 7 | 2 | 5 | 13 | −8 | 18.18 |
| Libya | 1953 | 2025 | 8 | 0 | 6 | 2 | 7 | 12 | −5 | 0.00 |
| Malaysia | 2001 | 2025 | 6 | 4 | 0 | 2 | 18 | 5 | +13 | 66.67 |
| Maldives | 2012 | 2017 | 4 | 3 | 1 | 0 | 13 | 1 | +12 | 75.00 |
| Myanmar | 2011 | 2014 | 3 | 2 | 0 | 1 | 6 | 5 | +1 | 66.67 |
| Morocco | 1976 | 2021 | 3 | 0 | 0 | 3 | 1 | 10 | −9 | 0.00 |
| Mauritania | 1976 | 2010 | 2 | 1 | 1 | 0 | 1 | 0 | +1 | 50.00 |
| Nepal | 2009 | 2018 | 4 | 2 | 2 | 0 | 3 | 0 | +3 | 50.00 |
| New Zealand | 2026 | 2026 | 1 | 0 | 1 | 0 | 2 | 2 | +0 | 0.00 |
| North Korea | 1966 | 2012 | 2 | 0 | 0 | 2 | 1 | 7 | −6 | 0.00 |
| South Korea | 2024 | 2024 | 2 | 0 | 2 | 0 | 1 | 1 | +0 | 0.00 |
| Northern Mariana Islands | 2013 | 2013 | 1 | 1 | 0 | 0 | 9 | 0 | +9 | 100.00 |
| Oman | 2012 | 2025 | 6 | 1 | 1 | 4 | 5 | 8 | −3 | 16.67 |
| Pakistan | 2000 | 2018 | 5 | 5 | 0 | 0 | 11 | 1 | +10 | 100.00 |
| Philippines | 2011 | 2022 | 4 | 2 | 1 | 1 | 8 | 4 | +4 | 50.00 |
| Qatar | 1972 | 2025 | 13 | 2 | 2 | 9 | 13 | 19 | −6 | 15.38 |
| Saudi Arabia | 1976 | 2025 | 12 | 0 | 5 | 7 | 7 | 24 | −17 | 0.00 |
| Seychelles | 2020 | 2020 | 1 | 1 | 0 | 0 | 1 | 0 | +1 | 100.00 |
| Singapore | 2003 | 2021 | 6 | 2 | 1 | 3 | 6 | 8 | −2 | 33.33 |
| Sri Lanka | 2020 | 2020 | 1 | 1 | 0 | 0 | 2 | 0 | +2 | 100.00 |
| Sudan | 1965 | 2010 | 8 | 0 | 4 | 4 | 8 | 14 | −6 | 0.00 |
| Syria | 1966 | 2025 | 16 | 2 | 6 | 8 | 13 | 25 | −12 | 12.50 |
| Tajikistan | 2016 | 2026 | 5 | 2 | 3 | 0 | 10 | 6 | +4 | 40.00 |
| Tanzania | 2011 | 2011 | 1 | 0 | 0 | 1 | 0 | 1 | −1 | 0.00 |
| Thailand | 2011 | 2011 | 2 | 0 | 1 | 1 | 2 | 3 | −1 | 0.00 |
| Timor-Leste | 2015 | 2016 | 2 | 2 | 0 | 0 | 10 | 0 | +10 | 100.00 |
| Tunisia | 1969 | 2025 | 3 | 0 | 2 | 1 | 5 | 9 | −4 | 0.00 |
| Turkmenistan | 2012 | 2012 | 1 | 0 | 1 | 0 | 0 | 0 | +0 | 0.00 |
| United Arab Emirates | 1999 | 2024 | 6 | 1 | 3 | 2 | 3 | 7 | −4 | 16.67 |
| Uzbekistan | 2004 | 2023 | 6 | 1 | 0 | 5 | 2 | 10 | −8 | 16.67 |
| Vietnam (Note: Includes record against North Vietnam and South Vietnam) | 1966 | 2023 | 3 | 1 | 0 | 2 | 3 | 7 | −4 | 33.33 |
| Yemen | 2010 | 2022 | 7 | 5 | 0 | 2 | 13 | 5 | +8 | 71.43 |
| Total | 1953 | 2026 | 277 | 77 | 77 | 123 | 343 | 431 | −88 | 27.80 |

Last updated: Palestine vs Lebanon, 17 November 2026. Statistics include official FIFA-recognised matches only.

== Honours ==
=== Continental ===
- AFC Challenge Cup
  - (gold) Champions (1): 2014

=== Regional ===
- Arab Games
  - (bronze) Bronze medal (1): 1999

=== Friendly ===
- Bangabandhu Cup (2): 2018, 2020
- CFA Team China International Tournament: 2026

=== Awards ===
- AFC National Team of the Year (1): 2014

== See also ==
- Palestine national under-23 football team
- Palestine national under-20 football team
- Palestine national under-17 football team
- Palestine women's national football team
- Football in Palestine
- West Bank Premier League
- Gaza Strip Premier League
- Football in Palestine
- Sport in Palestine
- List of men's national association football teams
