= Juan Carlos Carotti =

Argentine football player and manager

Personal information
- Full name: Juan Carlos Carotti
- Date of birth: 6 March 1942
- Place of birth: Casilda, Argentina
- Date of death: 28 October 2025 (aged 83)
- Place of death: Argentina
- Position: Forward

Senior career*
Years	Team	Apps	(Gls)
1960	Newell's Old Boys	10	(3)
1961–1966	San Lorenzo	63	(12)
1967	Unión Santa Fe	20	(0)
1968–1969	Millonarios		
1970	Independiente Medellín		
1972	Estudiantes BA	12	(1)
1973	Gimnasia de Jujuy		

Managerial career
- San Lorenzo (youth)
- 1986–1987: San Lorenzo (interim)
- 1988: Deportivo Morón
- 1992: San Lorenzo (interim)
- 1993–1994: Deportivo Laferrere
- 1995: Guabirá
- 1995: The Strongest
- 1996: Bolívar
- 1997: Provincial Osorno
- 1997–1998: San Miguel
- 1998: Palestino
- 2001: Provincial Osorno
- 2003: Blooming
- 2004: Guabirá
- 2005: Destroyer's
- * Club domestic league appearances and goals

Juan Carlos Carotti (6 March 1942 – 28 October 2025) was an Argentine football forward and manager.

== Career ==
Born in Casilda, Argentina, Carotti started his career with Newell's Old Boys in 1960. He stood out with San Lorenzo de Almagro from 1961 to 1966, as a member of team nicknamed Los Carasucias (the Dirty-Faced Kids). After, he played for Unión de Santa Fe in his homeland before moving to Colombia to play for Millonarios and Independiente Medellín.

Back to Argentina, Carotti ended his career with Estudiantes de Buenos Aires and Gimnasia y Esgrima de Jujuy.

== Coaching career ==
Following his retirement, Carotti started coaching at the San Lorenzo de Almagro youth ranks and served as interim manager of the senior team twice.

Abroad, Carotti managed clubs in Bolivia and Chile. In Bolivia, he led Guabirá, The Strongest, Bolívar and Destroyer's.

In Chile, Carotti led Provincial Osorno twice and Palestino.
