= 2009 Torneo Apertura (Primera B de Chile) =

Primera B de Chile
- Season: 2009 Primera B
- Champions: Unión San Felipe

The 2009 Torneo Apertura was the 59th completed season of the Primera B de Chile.

Unión San Felipe was tournament's champion.

== League table ==
Pos	Team	Pld	W	D	L	GF	GA	GD	Pts
1	Unión San Felipe	19	12	4	3	35	18	+17	40
2	Santiago Wanderers	19	9	6	4	33	19	+14	33
3	San Luis de Quillota	19	8	7	4	25	12	+13	31
4	Deportes Melipilla	19	8	6	5	30	28	+2	30
5	San Marcos de Arica	19	7	6	6	17	21	−4	27
6	Coquimbo Unido	19	7	5	7	21	20	+1	26
7	Lota Schwager	19	7	5	7	21	25	−4	26
8	Provincial Osorno	19	6	7	6	22	27	−5	25
9	Deportes Antofagasta	19	5	8	6	26	26	0	23
10	Naval	19	6	5	8	20	24	−4	23
11	Deportes Puerto Montt	19	5	5	9	26	30	−4	20
12	Unión La Calera	19	4	7	8	27	31	−4	19
13	Deportes Concepción	19	4	6	9	25	35	−10	18
14	Deportes Copiapó	19	4	5	10	12	24	−12	17

Source: RSSSF
