= Moussa Bezaz =

French-Algerian footballer and manager (born 1957)

Personal information
- Date of birth: December 30, 1957 (age 68)
- Place of birth: Grarem, French Algeria
- Position: Defender

Youth career
- Épinal
- Sochaux

Senior career*
Years	Team	Apps	(Gls)
1976–1983	Sochaux	126	(4)
1983–1985	Rennes	16	(0)
1985–1987	Épinal		
1987–1989	Chaumont		

International career
- France U-23

Managerial career
- 1987–1991: Chaumont
- 1991–1997: Charleville
- 1997–1998: Épinal
- 1999–2002: Nancy (Reserves)
- 2002: Nancy
- 2009–2011: Palestine
- 2011: Bahrain U-19
- 2011: Lebanon (assistant)
- 2011–2013: Bahrain U-23
- 2013: AS Belfort Sud
- 2014–2015: US Chaouia
- 2015–2016: AS Montigny-lès-Metz
- 2016–?: Bordeaux (scout)
- * Club domestic league appearances and goals

Moussa Bezaz (born 30 December 1957) is a French-Algerian former professional football player and coach.

His nephew is the Algerian footballer Yacine Bezzaz.

== Career ==
Born in Algeria, Bezaz spent his whole career in France, playing as a defender for Sochaux, Rennes, Épinal and Chaumont, where he began his coaching career.

He also played several times for the France national youth football team, and therefore never played for Algeria.

== Coaching career ==
Bezaz coached Chaumont, Charleville, Épinal and Nancy in France. He was named Palestine national team manager in July 2009. He has also coached in Bahrain, Lebanon and Algeria.
