= Andrzej Wiśniewski =

Polish football manager (1956–2022)

Personal information
- Full name: Andrzej Bogumił Wiśniewski
- Date of birth: 13 January 1956
- Place of birth: Giżycko, Poland
- Date of death: 3 April 2022 (aged 66)
- Position: Defender

Senior career*
Years	Team	Apps	(Gls)
- Orlęta Bęblin
- AZS-AWF Warsaw
- Pogoń Szczecin
- Polam Warsaw
- Hutnik Warsaw

Managerial career
- Hutnik Warsaw
- Orlęta Reszel
- Jeziorak Iława
- Ursus Warsaw
- Jeziorak Iława
- Hutnik Warsaw
- Piast Choszczno
- Mazowsze Grójec
- 2001: Wisła Płock
- 2002: Palestine
- 2003: Błękitni Stargard Szczeciński
- 2003–2004: Unia Janikowo
- 2005: Drwęca Nowe Miasto Lubawskie
- 2006: Polonia Warsaw
- 2007: Unia Janikowo
- 2008: KSZO Ostrowiec Świętokrzyski
- 2017: KSZO Ostrowiec Świętokrzyski
- * Club domestic league appearances and goals

Andrzej Bogumił Wiśniewski (13 January 1956 – 3 April 2022) was a Polish professional football manager and player.

== Career ==
In 2001, Wiśniewski briefly managed Wisła Płock, which suffered relegation to the second division. In 2002, he coached the Palestine national team. Later he worked with third and second tier teams, including Jeziorak Iława and Drwęca Nowe Miasto Lubawskie, which was promoted in the 2004–05 season to the second league, but after several defeats at the start of the following campaign, Wiśniewski left the club.

On 26 April 2006, Wiśniewski was appointed manager of Polonia Warsaw, succeeding Jan Żurek, before becoming the club's sporting director shortly after. Then, he resumed coaching in 2007, when he joined Unia Janikowo. In autumn 2007, he signed a contract to take over as manager of KSZO Ostrowiec Świętokrzyski from 1 January 2008.

== Death ==
Wiśniewski died of a heart attack on 3 April 2022, at the age of 66.
