= Brujas de Salamanca =

- Full name: Club Deportivo Brujas de Salamanca
- Nickname: Brujos
- Founded: May 15, 2015
- Ground: Municipal de Salamanca; Salamanca, Chile
- Capacity: 3 000 spectators
- Coach: Jeremías Viale
- League: Segunda División Profesional
- 2024: 2nd (Promoted)
Home colours	Away colours

The Club Brujas de Salamanca is a Chilean football club based in Salamanca. It currently competes in the Tercera División A.

== History ==
In the 2016 season, after a great Phase 1, Brujas de Salamanca managed to access Phase 2, where it would finish again behind the champion of Tercera División B, Provincial Ovalle.

Since the 2017 season, the team has participated in the Tercera División A, where it has performed well, finishing near the top of the table but failing to qualify for the Promotion League.

For the 2018 season, Brujas de Salamanca finished sixth in the Tercera División A, repeating the same position the following season. During the 2020 season, due to the COVID-19 pandemic, the team withdrew from the competition. It returned in 2021, finishing second to last in the northern group, only saved from relegation by Deportes Vallenar's poor performance.

On October 21, 2025, Brujas de Salamanca played Deportes Valdivia at home, achieving a close 1-1 draw. This, combined with the other results in other matches, mathematically secured them promotion to the Segunda División Profesional for the first time in their history. On the last matchday, they faced Santiago City away to determine the division champion, losing 2-1, and both teams ultimately achieved promotion to the professional division.

== Current squad ==
As of 27 July 2026. Note: Flags indicate national team as defined under FIFA eligibility rules; some limited exceptions apply. Players may hold more than one non-FIFA nationality.

No.	Pos.	Nation	Player
1	GK	CHI	Joshua Tapia
3	DF	CHI	Mauro Tapia
4	DF	CHI	Leonel Macaya (loan from Huachipato)
5	DF	CHI	Miguel Espinoza (loan from San Luis)
6	DF	CHI	Hugo Rojo
7	FW	CHI	Wladimir Cid
8	MF	CHI	Fabián Carmona
10	FW	CHI	Felipe Durán
11	FW	CHI	Bastián Valdés
12	MF	CHI	Diego Ortiz (loan from Coquimbo Unido)
13	MF	CHI	Omar Pastén
14	MF	CHI	Ignacio Morales (loan from Huachipato)
15	MF	CHI	Francisco Arenas
16	FW	CHI	Benjamín Osses
17	DF	CHI	Josué González

No.	Pos.	Nation	Player
18	MF	CHI	Mauricio Arias
19	FW	CHI	Bastián Pinnola
20	DF	CHI	Víctor Araya
21	FW	ARG	Maximiliano Quinteros
22	GK	ARG	Leandro Requena
23	DF	CHI	Nicolás Barrios
24	DF	CHI	César Molina
25	GK	CHI	Sebastián Aravena (loan from Rangers)
26	MF	ARG	Juan Pablo Miño (c)
27	FW	CHI	Alejandro Valencia
28	MF	CHI	Javier Meléndez
30	MF	CHI	Juan Araya
31	FW	CHI	Jarol Pizarro
—	DF	CHI	Cristóbal Huerta
—	FW	CHI	Ignacio Vega

== Coaches ==
- (Chile) Osvaldo Hurtado (2015)
- (Chile) Manuel Rodríguez (2016)
- (Chile) Francisco Uribe (2017)
- (Chile) Juan Pizarro (2018–2019)
- (Chile) Alejandro Pérez (2021)
- (Chile) Juan Pizarro (2022)
- (Chile) José Durán (2023)
- (Argentina) Jeremías Viale (2023–2025)
- (Chile) Felipe Cornejo (2026–Present)

== Kits ==
The institutional colors are green, white and red.

- Home Kits: Green t-shirts, white shorts and green socks.
- Away Kits: White t-shirts, white shorts and white socks.

== Sponsorship ==
Period	Brand	Sponsor
2015–2016	Dalponte	Salamanca
2017–2018	Four	Salamanca
2019	Ocapa	Salamanca
2021	Ocapa	Minera Pelambres
2022	JCQ	Salamanca
2023	Givova	Salamanca
2024	Givova	Paferco

== Seasons ==
- 1 seasons in Segunda División Profesional (2025–)
- 8 seasons in Tercera División A (2017–2024)
- 2 seasons in Tercera División B (2015–2016)

== Honours ==
Nationals
Competition	Champion	Runner-up
Tercera División A (0/1)		2024
Tercera División B (0/1)		2016

== Bibliography ==
- Gatica Wierman, Héctor (2019). Almanaque del Fútbol Chileno. Clubes. Hueders. ISBN 9789563651140.
