= Azmi Nassar =

Palestinian football manager

Azmi Nassar عزمي نصار
Personal information
- Date of birth: 3 October 1957
- Place of birth: Nazareth, Israel
- Date of death: 26 March 2007 (aged 49)
- Position: Forward

Senior career*
Years	Team	Apps	(Gls)
1974–1982	Maccabi Ahi Nazareth		
1983–1986	Hapoel Haifa		
1985–1987	Maccabi Tamra		

Managerial career
- Hapoel Daliyat al-Karmel
- Maccabi Tamra
- Maccabi Kafr Kanna
- Hapoel Majd al-Krum
- 1999–2000: Palestine
- 2000–2001: Bnei Sakhnin
- 2001: Palestine
- 2002–2003: Maccabi Ahi Nazareth
- 2005–2007: Palestine
- * Club domestic league appearances and goals

Azmi Nassar (Arabic: عزمي نصار, Hebrew: עזמי נסאר; 3 October 1957 – 26 March 2007) was a Palestinian football manager and served as manager of the Palestinian national football team.

== Professional career ==
=== Palestinian National Team ===
In order to serve as manager of the Palestinian national football team, Nassar was required to obtain a Palestinian ID and passport to go. His ability to travel freely between the territories contributed to his success as the national team coach.

=== Maccabi Ahi Nazareth ===
After guiding the club to the Israeli Premier League, Nassar resigned after the club was unsuccessful throughout the season and was replaced by Shiye Feigenbaum.

== Personal life ==
A resident of Nazareth, Nassar was married to Ruthy, and they are followers of Christianity. Azmi's wife is technically Jewish and until her marriage to Azmi, when she was 18. Ruthy is the daughter of a mixed marriage between Ya'akov Kashlawi (an Arab Christian from Bir Zeit) and Rachel Cohen (a Jew from Petah Tikva).
