= Abdel Nasser Barakat =

Palestinian football manager

Personal information
- Date of birth: 15 May 1974 (age 52)
- Place of birth: Palestine
- Position: Left winger

Youth career
- 1988–1993: Thaqafi Al-Bireh

Senior career*
Years	Team	Apps	(Gls)
1993–2005	Al-Bireh		(120)

Managerial career
- 1999: Al-Bireh (youth sides)
- 2004–2007: Palestine U17
- 2008–2011: Palestine U19
- 2012–2015: Palestine U-23
- 2015–2017: Palestine
- * Club domestic league appearances and goals

Abdel Nasser Barakat (born 15 May 1974) is a Palestinian football manager, who was an attacking midfielder for Al-Bireh until he retired. He was the head coach on an interim basis for the Palestine national football team for a single match in 2011. Barakat took over the Palestine national football team in May 2015 after guiding the Olympic side for two years.

He has coached several clubs in Palestine and all age groups of the Palestine national team setup. He was the manager of the Palestine national football team and a holder of a UEFA Pro certificate in coaching.

== Coaching career ==
Barakat started his professional playing career at the age of 17 with Al-Bireh Institute, where he spent several years. During his playing days he was known as the “Bulldozer” for the power and speed he exhibited as a winger. He was also a member of the Palestine national team for two years.

Barakat got his start in coaching at an early age when he was offered the role as a youth team coach by his club, Al-Bireh institute. He won 43 titles while coaching at U12, U14, and U16 level. His success convinced the Palestinian Football Association to hand him the responsibility of coaching the U14 national team.

After taking the role of U14 coach with the Palestine national team, Barakat was then given the responsibility of coaching the U17 program at the age of 25. During the AFC U17 Championship qualification campaign, Barakat was the youngest manager at 25 years of age.

Despite his youth he won the accolade of best manager in the competition after leading Palestine to its first ever win at youth level, beating Bahrain 3–2.

He then parlayed that experience into a role with the U19 program eventually taking over the Olympic team set up in 2013. As Olympic Team coach he led Palestine to its best performance at an Asian Games- recording their first ever win in the competition and leading them past the group stage for the first time.

== Palestine national football team ==
Abdel Nasser Barakat was appointed manager of the Palestine national football team in April 2015, one month before the start of combined qualification campaign for the 2018 FIFA World Cup and the 2019 AFC Asian Cup.

While in the role, Barakat qualified Palestine for the 2019 AFC Asian Cup finals and guided them to their best ever FIFA ranking of 73 (November 2017). In 19 matches with the national team he has recorded 11 wins, 6 draws, and two losses.

He holds the national team record for most consecutive wins (7) and most consecutive matches without a loss (11).

=== Managerial statistics ===
As of 14 November 2017

Managerial record by team and tenure
Team	From	To	Record							
Team	From	To	G	W	D	L	GF	GA	GD	Win %
Palestine	18 April 2015	19 December 2017	19	11	6	2	57	12	+45	57.89
Total			19	11	6	2	57	12	+45	57.89
