= Provincial Osorno =

Chilean football club

- Full name: Club Deportes Provincial Osorno
- Nicknames: Los Toros (The Bulls) founded = 1983; 43 years ago
- Ground: Estadio Rubén Marcos Peralta; Osorno, Chile
- Capacity: 10,000
- Chairman: Jorge Valenzuela T.
- Manager: Jeremías Viale
- League: Segunda División
- 2025: 4th.
| Home colours | Away colours |

Provincial Osorno is a football club based in Osorno, Los Lagos Region, Chile. The club is currently playing at the third tier of the Chilean football system, the Segunda División.

The club were founded on 5 June 1983 and then re-founded on 3 December 2012.

Between 1993 and 1998, a period of 6 years, they were continuously members of Chile's top division although they never finished higher than sixth.

Until 2009 the club also operated a basketball professional team, Provincial Osorno Basquetbol, They played in the Chilean Basketball Professional League.

== History ==
Provincial Osorno were founded on 5 June 1983 by a group of amateur football and local authorities, who designed Sergio Toloza as the first Provincial Osorno's Chairman.

In July 1983, the club appointed Juan Soto as manager. Six local amateur players were included in the first squad. Later that year the club played their first official Primera B match against Lota Schwager, at the Estadio Bancario de Osorno (P. Osorno won 2–1).

Two years later the club became very popular, resulting in many home sell out crowds in the Estadio Parque Schott that season.

In their early campaigns Provincial Osorno struggles to show good results on the pitch.

Only in 1990, Provincial Osorno finally won the second division title to win promotion to the Primera Division for the first time, under the direction of manager Guillermo Yavar, but they finished near the bottom of the table and were relegated in 1991.

The return to the second division in 1992 owes a great deal to the appointment of manager Jorge Garcés, who brought new tactics and a new training regime resulting in an impressing campaign that year.

This time the club managed to stay in the top flight until 1998, with regular campaigns, with the exception of 1996, when, under the direction of manager Oscar "Cacho" Malbernat they finished 6th.

In 1999 they won promotion to the Primera Division in a playoff with Cobresal, returning immediately to the Primera B the next year.

Since then, the club struggles to show good results on the pitch with the notable exception of 2003 when they qualified to the Copa Sudamericana, having beating four First Division's teams in a row, only to lose against Universidad Católica on penalties, in the highly controversial second-leg match.

In 2006 the club was turned into a Sports' joint stock company.

On 25 November 2007 P. Osorno were crowned champions of the Primera B 2007, after beating Municipal Iquique 4–0 at Tierra de Campeones Stadium, and returned to the Primera Division for the 2008 season; losing the category that season and returning to the Primera B, again.

In 2010 the club were relegated to the semi-professional third tier Tercera División, after losing the match for the stay with Deportes Copiapó.

In 2012 the club played at the new third level professional league, the Segunda División, from where they were expelled the same year due to financial reasons.

The club were back in 2014, playing at the fifth tier of Chilean football system, the Tercera B, one year later they were promoted to the upper tier, the Tercera División, and in 2016 they were promoted again, this time to the third tier Segunda División, just to be relegated back to the fourth level Tercera División, were they played from the 2018 until the 2022 season, when they gain promotion to Segunda once again.

== Crest ==
1983 to 1996

1996 to 2007

2007 to 2012

The club first crest, unveiled in 1983, featured the Osorno Volcano with a football on the top, it was a very simple design, in black and white.

In 1996, the club adopted their new crest with different colours and a black bull (the club mascot) in the center.

In 2007, the club unveiled a modernised crest featuring both elements (the volcano and the bull) in a simplified style. It was elected with an open poll in the local newspaper Diario Austral de Osorno.

== Team colours ==
Provincial Osorno's home colour is dark blue shirt with white shorts and white socks.

=== Kit evolution ===
| 1983–84 | 1985–86 | 1986–92 | 1993–95 | 1996-06 | 2007–10 | 2011–12 | 2013–14 |

=== Shirt sponsors ===
List of Kit Manufacturers

- Le Coq Sportif (1986–90)
- Adidas (1991–94)
- Club Sport (1995–2010)
- Training (2011)
- Imtex (2012–2017)
- Spearhead (2018)
- KS7 (2019)
- Imtex (2021)
- TDeportes (2022–present)

List of Shirt Sponsors

- Supermercados Hayal 1985)
- Felco (1986–87)
- Pisco Diaguitas (1988)
- Homelite (1989–90)
- PF (1991–92)
- Cerveza Cristal (1993–2000)
- Saesa (2001–02)
- Universidad de Los Lagos (2003)
- Carrasco Créditos (2004–05)
- Frigosor (2006)
- Quesos Kumey (2007)
- Tata (2008–09)
- PF (2010)
- Rastro.com (2011)
- CREO (2012)
- Jeremias Fuentes Construccion (2013–2015)
- Municipalidad de Osorno (2016)
- Lipigas (2017)
- Municipalidad de Osorno (2018–2019)
- Grupo Hijuelas (2021–)

== Stadiums ==
Provincial Osorno's current stadium is the Estadio Rubén Marcos Peralta, an ancient 10,000-wood stands' football stadium situated at the south end of "Cochrane" street in Osorno, leased from Osorno City Municipality since 1984.

Provincial Osorno have also used other grounds during their history.

The Estadio Bancario de Osorno, was Provincial Osorno's home from 1983 until March 1984.

Provincial Osorno also played their last two Primera B 2006 home games at Estadio Municipal de San Pablo, when the pitch cover was switched to artificial grass at Estadio Rubén Marcos Peralta.

Provincial Osorno played their last Primera B 2007 home game at Estadio Alberto Allaire de Rahue.

== Supporters ==
Provincial Osorno have a small fanbase, which derives support from a broad cross-section of the community. Fans traditionally come from Osorno itself; particularly the Francke, and Rahue areas of the city. Support from other towns like San Pablo, Purranque and Rio Negro, is very limited.

Provincial Osorno supporters' current main rivals are Deportes Puerto Montt (with whom they contest the "Clasico del Sur"), and Deportes Temuco.

There is no current rivalry with their other immediate neighbours Deportes Valdivia. This is mainly because the clubs have very rarely been in the same league. However, before going out of Primera B (1990), they were P. Osorno's biggest rivals.

== Squad ==
- Updated 28 July 2026

Note: Flags indicate national team as defined under FIFA eligibility rules; some limited exceptions apply. Players may hold more than one non-FIFA nationality.

| No. | Pos. | Nation | Player |
|---|---|---|---|
| 1 | GK | CHI | Daniel Retamal |
| 2 | DF | CHI | Vicente Yáñez (loan from Deportes Puerto Montt) |
| 3 | DF | CHI | Daniel Pino (loan from Palestino) |
| 4 | DF | CHI | Eduardo Navarrete |
| 5 | FW | CHI | Juan Arias (loan from Deportes Puerto Montt) |
| 6 | MF | CHI | Ignacio Pacheco (loan from Cobresal) |
| 7 | FW | CHI | Felipe Escobar |
| 8 | MF | CHI | Juan Gutiérrez |
| 9 | FW | ARG | Diego Bielkiewicz (c) |
| 10 | MF | CHI | Diego Pezoa |
| 11 | FW | CHI | Esteban Antilef |
| 12 | GK | CHI | Francisco Cifuentes |
| 14 | MF | CHI | Sebastián Namoncura |
| 16 | MF | CHI | Diego Vergara |
| 17 | MF | CHI | Carlos Soto |
| 18 | GK | CHI | Diego Lara |
| 19 | MF | CHI | Abel Moreno |
| 20 | FW | CHI | Gustavo Castro |

| No. | Pos. | Nation | Player |
|---|---|---|---|
| 21 | FW | CMR | Job Bogmis |
| 22 | DF | CHI | Marcel Cortez |
| 23 | DF | CHI | Gonzalo Lauler |
| 24 | DF | CHI | Bastián Villegas |
| 25 | MF | CHI | Luis Oyarzo |
| 26 | FW | CHI | Benjamín Cortés (loan from Universidad de Chile) |
| 27 | DF | CHI | Brandon Cáceres |
| 28 | MF | CHI | Diego González |
| 29 | DF | CHI | Luciano Meneses |
| 30 | FW | CHI | Dilan Guzmán (loan from Deportes Santa Cruz) |
| 31 | FW | HAI | Manley Clerveaux (loan from Colo-Colo) |
| 32 | MF | CHI | Héctor Canelo (loan from Universidad de Chile) |
| 33 | MF | CHI | Rubén Vera (loan from Universidad de Chile) |
| 35 | DF | CHI | Cristóbal Ulloa (loan from Universidad de Chile) |
| — | DF | CHI | Franko Fernández |
| — | MF | CHI | José Cáceres |
| — | FW | CHI | Francisco Opitz |

== Honours ==
- Pre-Copa Sudamericana: 1

2003

- Primera B: 3

1990, 1992, 2007

- Tercera División: 1

2016

=== Seasons ===
- 1 Participation in Copa Sudamericana (2003)
- 9 seasons in First Level (Primera División) (1991, 1993–1998, 2000, 2008)
- 19 seasons in Second Level (Primera B) (1983–1990, 1992, 1999, 2001–2007, 2009–2010)
- 4 seasons in Third Level (Tercera & Segunda) (2011) & (2012, 2017, 2023–)
- 5 seasons in Fourth Level (Tercera División) (2016, 2018–2019, 2021–2022)
- 2 seasons in Fifth Level (Tercera B) (2014–2015)
- 1 season in Amateur Local Level (ANFA Osorno) (2013)

* Tercera División was the third level of Chilean football until 2012

== South American cups history ==
| Season | Competition | Round | Opponent | Away | Home | Aggregate |
|---|---|---|---|---|---|---|
| 2003 | Copa Sudamericana | First | (Chile) Universidad Católica | 1–0 | 1–2 | 2–2 (3:5p) |

== Records ==
- Record victory (overall) — 10–0 v. Deportes Linares (Primera B 1990)
- Record Primera División victory — 6–1 v. Santiago Wanderers (1996)
- Record Copa Chile victory — 8–0 v. Lord Cochrane Aysén (2010)
- Record Primera División defeat — 1–8 v. Cobresal (1991)
- Most goals scored in a league season (Primera División matches) — 14, Mario Núñez (2008)
- Most Primera División appearances — 160, Victor Monje (1991–98)
- Most goals scored (Primera División matches) — 25, Jose Luis Diaz (1996–98)
- Most goals scored overall — 51, Javier Grandoli (1988–91)
- Highest home attendance — 11,357 v. Universidad de Chile (26 August 1995)
- Primera División Best Position — 6th (1996)
- Copa Chile Best Season — Quarter-Finals (1989)

== Managers ==
- (Chile) Juan Soto (1983)
- (Chile) Jaime Ramírez (1983–1984)
- (Chile) Hector Barría (1984)
- (Chile) José Benito Ríos (1985)
- (Chile) Juan Carlos Gangas (1985)
- (Chile) Sergio Gutiérrez (1986)
- (Chile) Dante Pesce / Rubén Acuña (1986)
- (Argentina) (Chile) Fernando Cavalleri (1987–1988)
- (Chile) Guillermo Yávar (1989–1991)
- (Chile) Guillermo Díaz (1991)
- (Chile) Jorge Garcés (1992)
- (Germany) Peter Obermeyer (1993)
- (Chile) Guillermo Yávar (1993)
- (Argentina) (Italy) Antonio Angelillo (1994)
- (Chile) Juan Páez (1994)
- (Argentina) Oscar Malbernat (1995–1996)
- (Argentina) Juan Carlos Carotti (1997)
- (Argentina) Abel Moralejo (1998)
- (Argentina) Marcelo Trobbiani (1998)
- (Chile) Gino Valentini (1999–2000)
- (Chile) Nelson Mores (2000–2001)
- (Argentina) Juan Carlos Carotti (2001)
- (Uruguay) (Chile) Washington Olivera (2002)
- (Chile) Arnoldo Marín (2002)
- (Chile) Guillermo Yávar (2002)
- (Brazil) Ned Barbosa (2003)
- (Argentina) Claudio Nigretti (2003)
- (Chile) Nelson Mores (2004–2005)
- (Argentina) Jorge Dubanced (2005)
- (Chile) Osvaldo Villegas (2006)
- (Chile) Christian Riadi (2006)
- (Chile) Nelson Mores (2006)
- (Chile) Osvaldo Hurtado (2007–2008)
- (Argentina) Mario Vanemerak (2008)
- (Chile) Gerhard Reiher (2008)
- (Chile) Cristián Romero (2009–2010)
- (Argentina) Claudio Nigretti (2010)
- (Chile) Carlos Rojas (2011)
- (Chile) Manuel Rodríguez Vega (2011)
- (Chile) Nelson Mores (2012)
- (Chile) Marcos Millape (2013–2017)
- (Chile) Nelson Cossio (2017)
- (Chile) Mauricio Sanz (2018)
- (Chile) Nelson Mores (2018)
- (Chile) Felipe Astorga (2019)
- (Chile) Álvaro Muñoz (2019)
- (Argentina) Ricardo Lunari (2021–2022)
- (Chile) Diego Martínez (2022–2024)
- (Chile) Rodrigo Venegas (2025)
- (Argentina) Jeremías Viale (2026–Present)

== Provincial Osorno Basquetbol ==
Provincial Osorno Basquetbol were the basketball branch affiliated to Provincial Osorno. It was founded in 1996 and disbanded in 2009.

Provincial Osorno Basquetbol was one of the most successful teams in Chilean basketball history. They won the Chilean Basketball League title, Dimayor, 4 times in their short history.

Provincial Osorno Basketball played their home matches at the Gimnasio Maria Gallardo.

== See also ==
- Chilean football league system
