= 2016 AFC U-16 Championship qualification =

Tournament details
- Host countries: Palestine (Group A); Kyrgyzstan (Group B); Qatar (Group C); Bangladesh (Group D); Iran (Group E); Kuwait (Group F); Laos (Group G); Singapore (Group H); China (Group I); Vietnam (Group J); Mongolia (Group K)
- Dates: 2–20 September 2015
- Teams: 45 (from 1 confederation)

Tournament statistics
- Matches played: 61
- Goals scored: 341 (5.59 per match)
- Attendance: 71,152 (1,166 per match)
- Top scorer(s): Park Jeong-in; Rasul Yuldoshov (6 goals each)

The 2016 AFC U-16 Championship qualification decided the participating teams of the 2016 AFC U-16 Championship. The tournament is the 17th edition of the AFC U-16 Championship, the biennial international youth football championship organised by the Asian Football Confederation (AFC) for the men's under-16 national teams of Asia.

A total of 16 teams qualified to play in the final tournament, including India who qualified automatically as hosts but also competed in the qualifying stage.

Same as previous editions, the tournament acts as the AFC qualifiers for the FIFA U-17 World Cup. The top four teams of the final tournament will qualify for the 2017 FIFA U-17 World Cup in India as the AFC representatives, besides India who qualified automatically as hosts. If India are among the top four teams, the fifth-placed team (i.e., the losing quarter-finalist with the best record in the tournament) will also qualify for the 2017 FIFA U-17 World Cup.

== Draw ==
The draw for the qualifiers was held on 5 June 2015 at the AFC House in Kuala Lumpur. A total of 45 teams entered the qualifying stage and were drawn into eleven groups.

- West Zone, with 24 entrants from Central Asia, South Asia and West Asia, had six groups of four teams.
- East Zone, with 21 entrants from ASEAN and East Asia, had one group of five teams and four groups of four teams.

The teams were seeded according to their performance in the previous season in 2014.

	Pot 1	Pot 2	Pot 3	Pot 4	Pot 5
West Zone (Groups A–F)	Iran Nepal Qatar Uzbekistan Saudi Arabia Syria	Bahrain Kuwait (D) Oman Tajikistan United Arab Emirates Yemen	Afghanistan India (Q) Iraq Kyrgyzstan Pakistan (W) Palestine	Bangladesh Jordan Lebanon Maldives Sri Lanka (W) Turkmenistan	
East Zone (Groups G–K)	Australia Japan Malaysia North Korea South Korea	China Hong Kong Laos Thailand Vietnam	Brunei (W) Chinese Taipei Myanmar Philippines Singapore	Cambodia Guam Macau Mongolia Northern Mariana Islands	Timor-Leste

Did not enter
West Zone	Bhutan
East Zone	Indonesia (suspended by FIFA)

Note:
^{1} Non-FIFA member, ineligible for U-17 World Cup.

== Player eligibility ==
Players born on or after 1 January 2000 were eligible to compete in the 2016 AFC U-16 Championship.

== Format ==
In each group, teams played each other once at a centralised venue. The eleven group winners and the four best runners-up from all groups qualified for the final tournament. If India were one of the group winners or best runners-up, the fifth-best runner-up also qualified for the final tournament.

=== Tiebreakers ===
The teams were ranked according to points (3 points for a win, 1 point for a draw, 0 points for a loss). If tied on points, tiebreakers would be applied in the following order:

1. Greater number of points obtained in the group matches between the teams concerned;
2. Goal difference resulting from the group matches between the teams concerned;
3. Greater number of goals scored in the group matches between the teams concerned;
4. If, after applying criteria 1 to 3, teams still have an equal ranking, criteria 1 to 3 are reapplied exclusively to the matches between the teams in question to determine their final rankings. If this procedure does not lead to a decision, criteria 5 to 9 apply;
5. Goal difference in all the group matches;
6. Greater number of goals scored in all the group matches;
7. Penalty shoot-out if only two teams are involved and they are both on the field of play;
8. Fewer score calculated according to the number of yellow and red cards received in the group matches (1 point for a single yellow card, 3 points for a red card as a consequence of two yellow cards, 3 points for a direct red card, 4 points for a yellow card followed by a direct red card);
9. Drawing of lots.

== Groups ==
The matches were played between 2–6 September 2015 for Group H; 12–20 September 2015 for Group G (five-team group); 16–20 September 2015 for all other groups.

Key to colours in group tables
Group winners and best four runners-up, and India as hosts, qualify for the finals.
Withdrawn

=== Group A ===
- All matches were held in Palestine.
- Times listed were UTC+3.

Pos	Team	Pld	W	D	L	GF	GA	GD	Pts	Qualification
1	Uzbekistan	3	3	0	0	19	2	+17	9	Final tournament
2	Yemen	3	2	0	1	10	5	+5	6	Final tournament
3	Palestine (H)	3	1	0	2	3	8	−5	3	
4	Maldives	3	0	0	3	0	17	−17	0	

Source: AFC
Rules for classification: Qualification tiebreakers
(H) Hosts
16 September 2015
16:00

Uzbekistan	8–0	Maldives
Yuldoshov 12', 50', 71'; Abdurakhmonov 60', 74', 86'; Karimov 62'; Muydinov 83'	Report

Faisal Al-Husseini International Stadium, Al-Ram
Attendance: 100
Referee: Mohammad Abu Loum (Jordan)
16 September 2015
17:00

Yemen	2–0	Palestine
Sabarah 86', 90+3'	Report

Arab American University Stadium, Jenin
Attendance: 6,000
Referee: Pratap Singh (India)

18 September 2015
16:00

Maldives	0–6	Yemen
	Report	Aswad 23', 34'; Murshed 29'; Hamid 32' (o.g.); Al-Khalil 43'; Saeed 75'

Arab American University Stadium, Jenin
Attendance: 250
Referee: Timur Faizullin (Kyrgyzstan)
18 September 2015
17:00

Palestine	0–6	Uzbekistan
	Report	Kholdorov 13'; Ismoilov 20'; Muydinov 29' (pen.), 33'; Soatov 83'; Urunov 89'

Faisal Al-Husseini International Stadium, Al-Ram
Attendance: 200
Referee: Wathik Al-Baag (Iraq)

20 September 2015
17:00

Uzbekistan	5–2	Yemen
Yuldoshov 23', 67', 69'; Muydinov 37'; Nematov 41'	Report	Al-Hamdani 35'; Murshed 90+1'

Faisal Al-Husseini International Stadium, Al-Ram
Attendance: 70
Referee: Pratap Singh (India)
20 September 2015
17:00

Palestine	3–0	Maldives
Eleyan 11', 18'; Aburdaha 17'	Report

Arab American University Stadium, Jenin
Attendance: 150
Referee: Mohammad Abu Loum (Jordan)

=== Group B ===
- All matches were held in Kyrgyzstan.
- Times listed were UTC+6.

Pos	Team	Pld	W	D	L	GF	GA	GD	Pts	Qualification
1	Kyrgyzstan (H)	3	2	0	1	7	3	+4	6	Final tournament
2	Oman	3	2	0	1	5	2	+3	6	Final tournament
3	Jordan	3	2	0	1	6	4	+2	6	
4	Nepal (Note: On 27 October 2015, the AFC announced that Nepal were penalized as a result of the player Manish Karki failing an MRI bone test. Nepal were ruled to have forfeited all three matches where the ineligible player was fielded by a 3–0 scoreline.)	3	0	0	3	0	9	−9	0	

Source: AFC
Rules for classification: Qualification tiebreakers
(H) Hosts
Notes:
16 September 2015
15:00

Nepal	0–3 Awarded	Jordan
Subba 27', 69'	Report	Abu Awad 90+2'

Dolen Omurzakov Stadium, Bishkek
Attendance: 100
Referee: Salah Abbas Alabbasi (Bahrain)
16 September 2015
20:00

Oman	2–0	Kyrgyzstan
Al-Bakri 10'; Al-Khamisi 27'	Report

Dolen Omurzakov Stadium, Bishkek
Attendance: 6,500
Referee: Hasan Akrami (Iran)

18 September 2015
15:00

Jordan	2–0	Oman
Kourdi 82'; Abu Awad 83'	Report

Dolen Omurzakov Stadium, Bishkek
Attendance: 700
Referee: Sherzod Kasimov (Uzbekistan)
18 September 2015
20:00

Kyrgyzstan	3–0 Awarded	Nepal
Boubaev 29'; Shigaibaev 31' (pen.)	Report	Karki 55'; Subba 67'; Hemjan 73', 90+2'

Dolen Omurzakov Stadium, Bishkek
Attendance: 8,523
Referee: Feras Taweel (Syria)

20 September 2015
15:00

Nepal	0–3 Awarded	Oman
Tamang 88' (pen.)	Report	Al-Zaabi 11'; Al-Khamisi 44' (pen.); Al-Qaidi 90+2'

Dolen Omurzakov Stadium, Bishkek
Attendance: 500
Referee: Sherzod Kasimov (Uzbekistan)
20 September 2015
20:00

Kyrgyzstan	4–1	Jordan
Alykulov 11'; Shigaibaev 33'; Dzhakybaliev 72'; Orzobek 90+4'	Report	Hbowal 48' (pen.)

Dolen Omurzakov Stadium, Bishkek
Attendance: 7,400
Referee: Hasan Akrami (Iran)

=== Group C ===
- All matches were held in Qatar.
- Times listed were UTC+3.

Pos	Team	Pld	W	D	L	GF	GA	GD	Pts	Qualification
1	Iraq	3	3	0	0	9	1	+8	9	Final tournament
2	Tajikistan	3	2	0	1	7	4	+3	6	
3	Qatar (H)	3	1	0	2	5	2	+3	3	
4	Turkmenistan	3	0	0	3	1	15	−14	0	

Source: AFC
Rules for classification: Qualification tiebreakers
(H) Hosts
16 September 2015
16:00

Qatar	5–0	Turkmenistan
Al Ganehi 10'; Bahramen 40'; Ali 60', 90+4'; Saeed 83'	Report

Aspire Dome, Doha
Attendance: 200
Referee: Hidayat Ullah (Pakistan)
16 September 2015
19:00

Tajikistan	1–3	Iraq
Nematov 39'	Report	Jalil 45'; Abdulsada 45+2'; Jabbar 68'

Aspire Dome, Doha
Attendance: 100
Referee: Nivon Robesh Gamini (Sri Lanka)

18 September 2015
16:00

Turkmenistan	1–5	Tajikistan
Garabekow 85'	Report	Fuzaylov 3'; Hanonov 45+3'; Jumaýew 50' (o.g.); Muminov 67'; Qamchinov 82'

Aspire Dome, Doha
Attendance: 50
Referee: Marai Al-Awaji (Saudi Arabia)
18 September 2015
19:00

Iraq	1–0	Qatar
Jabbar 22'	Report

Aspire Dome, Doha
Attendance: 300
Referee: Rowan Arumughan (India)

20 September 2015
16:00

Qatar	0–1	Tajikistan
	Report	Fuzaylov 82'

Aspire Dome, Doha
Attendance: 150
Referee: Nivon Robesh Gamini (Sri Lanka)
20 September 2015
19:00

Iraq	5–0	Turkmenistan
Jabbar 19', 51' (pen.), 54'; Sartip 32'; Saleh 53'	Report

Aspire Dome, Doha
Attendance: 50
Referee: Hidayat Ullah (Pakistan)

=== Group D ===
- All matches were held in Bangladesh.
- Times listed were UTC+6.

Pos	Team	Pld	W	D	L	GF	GA	GD	Pts	Qualification
1	Saudi Arabia	2	2	0	0	11	3	+8	6	Final tournament
2	United Arab Emirates	2	1	0	1	8	7	+1	3	Final tournament
3	Bangladesh (H)	2	0	0	2	2	11	−9	0	
4	Pakistan	0	0	0	0	0	0	0	0	Withdrew

Source: AFC
Rules for classification: Qualification tiebreakers
(H) Hosts
16 September 2015
18:00

Saudi Arabia	5–1	Bangladesh
Almas 40'; Al-Buraikan 56'; Mali 82' (pen.); Al-Dhuwayhi 84'; Al-Abdan 90'	Report	Nipu 29'

Bangabandhu National Stadium, Dhaka
Attendance: 8,000
Referee: Ali Sabah Adday Al-Qaysi (Iraq)

18 September 2015
18:00

Bangladesh	1–6	United Arab Emirates
Shawon 52'	Report	Al-Naqbi 12'; Rashed 18', 62' (pen.), 68'; Saeed 22'; Saleh 38'

Bangabandhu National Stadium, Dhaka
Attendance: 6,000
Referee: Adham Makhadmeh (Jordan)

20 September 2015
18:00

Saudi Arabia	6–2	United Arab Emirates
Al-Shaikhi 8'; Al-Abdan 16', 57', 70'; Al-Anazi 27'; Almas 61'	Report	Al-Malki 5' (o.g.); Rashed 48' (pen.)

Bangabandhu National Stadium, Dhaka
Attendance: 800
Referee: Kim Dae-yong (South Korea)

=== Group E ===
- All matches were held in Iran.
- Times listed were UTC+4:30.

Pos	Team	Pld	W	D	L	GF	GA	GD	Pts	Qualification
1	Iran (H)	3	3	0	0	12	1	+11	9	Final tournament
2	India	3	2	0	1	11	3	+8	6	Final tournament as hosts
3	Bahrain	3	1	0	2	2	12	−10	3	
4	Lebanon	3	0	0	3	2	11	−9	0	

Source: AFC
Rules for classification: Qualification tiebreakers
(H) Hosts
16 September 2015
14:30

Bahrain	0–5	India
	Report	Gaston 16'; Chetri 20', 48'; Thangjam 29'; Wangjam 77'

Yadegar-e Emam Stadium, Tabriz
Attendance: 10
Referee: Aziz Asimov (Uzbekistan)
16 September 2015
18:40

Iran	3–1	Lebanon
Namdari 9' (pen.); Ghobeishavi 12'; Sardari 47'	Report	Kaawar 87'

Yadegar-e Emam Stadium, Tabriz
Attendance: 150
Referee: Çarymyrat Kurbanow (Turkmenistan)

18 September 2015
14:00

Lebanon	1–2	Bahrain
Abdullah 17'	Report	Abdulrahim 38' (pen.), 51'

Yadegar-e Emam Stadium, Tabriz
Attendance: 10
Referee: Ilgiz Tantashev (Uzbekistan)
18 September 2015
16:00

India	0–3	Iran
	Report	Sharifi 17'; Khodamoradi 43'; Ghaderi 65'

Gostaresh Foulad Stadium, Tabriz
Attendance: 165
Referee: Ali Shaban (Kuwait)

20 September 2015
16:00

India	6–0	Lebanon
Wangjam 29', 71', 89'; Baladi 75' (o.g.); Thatal 77'; Kiyam 80'	Report

Yadegar-e Emam Stadium, Tabriz
Attendance: 22
Referee: Aziz Asimov (Uzbekistan)
20 September 2015
16:00

Iran	6–0	Bahrain
Ghobeishavi 1'; Sharifi 18', 51'; Godarzi 45'; Sadeghi 65'; Davari 89'	Report

Gostaresh Foulad Stadium, Tabriz
Attendance: 100
Referee: Çarymyrat Kurbanow (Turkmenistan)

=== Group F ===
- All matches were held in Kuwait.
- Times listed were UTC+3.

Pos	Team	Pld	W	D	L	GF	GA	GD	Pts	Qualification
1	Kuwait (H)	2	1	1	0	1	0	+1	4	Qualified for final tournament, but suspended
2	Syria	2	0	2	0	2	2	0	2	
3	Afghanistan	2	0	1	1	2	3	−1	1	
4	Sri Lanka	0	0	0	0	0	0	0	0	Withdrew

Source: AFC
Rules for classification: Qualification tiebreakers
(H) Hosts
16 September 2015
18:25

Afghanistan	2–2	Syria
Ali 29'; Saneh 56'	Report	Malta 45+2'; Kanaan 70'

Al-Sadaqua Walsalam Stadium, Kuwait City
Attendance: 150
Referee: Abdulaziz Ahmed Abdulla (Bahrain)

18 September 2015
18:25

Kuwait	1–0	Afghanistan
Rashed 52'	Report

Al-Sadaqua Walsalam Stadium, Kuwait City
Attendance: 300
Referee: Tayeb Shamsuzzaman (Bangladesh)

20 September 2015
18:25

Syria	0–0	Kuwait
	Report

Al-Sadaqua Walsalam Stadium, Kuwait City
Attendance: 300
Referee: Ahmad Yacoub Ibrahim (Jordan)

=== Group G ===
- All matches were held in Laos.
- Times listed were UTC+7.

Pos	Team	Pld	W	D	L	GF	GA	GD	Pts	Qualification
1	Malaysia	4	3	1	0	22	1	+21	10	Final tournament
2	Laos (H)	4	2	2	0	13	3	+10	8	
3	Timor-Leste	4	2	1	1	18	2	+16	7	
4	Philippines	4	1	0	3	10	24	−14	3	
5	Northern Mariana	4	0	0	4	2	35	−33	0	

Source: AFC
Rules for classification: Qualification tiebreakers
(H) Hosts
12 September 2015
16:00

Timor-Leste	8–0	Northern Mariana
Jelito 45'; Danilson 49'; Armindo Vieira 51'; João Pedro 66', 88'; Dom Lucas 70'; Yafet Belima 72'; Orcelio 81'	Report

Laos National Stadium, Vientiane
Attendance: 300
Referee: Masoud Tufayelieh (Syria)
12 September 2015
19:00

Philippines	1–6	Laos
Tacardon 88'	Report	Inthapanya 18', 34'; Bounkong 47'; Monlangsy 56'; Luangsisombath 75', 90+1'

Laos National Stadium, Vientiane
Attendance: 2,400
Referee: Yousef Al-Marzouq (Kuwait)

14 September 2015
16:00

Northern Mariana	0–13	Malaysia
	Report	Izreen 6', 32', 54', 67'; Amirul 22'; Arif 36', 46'; Iqbal 41', 44', 56'; Alif 58', 61'; Najmi 89'

Laos National Stadium, Vientiane
Attendance: 200
Referee: Mizanur Rahman (Bangladesh)
14 September 2015
19:00

Timor-Leste	9–0	Philippines
Danilson 18', 28', 54'; João Pedro 38', 62'; Jelito 53'; Filomeno Junior 70'; Dom Lucas 73', 89'	Report

Laos National Stadium, Vientiane
Attendance: 200
Referee: Omar Al-Yaqoubi (Oman)

16 September 2015
16:00

Malaysia	1–0	Timor-Leste
Arif 79'	Report

Laos National Stadium, Vientiane
Attendance: 300
Referee: Yousef Al-Marzouq (Kuwait)
16 September 2015
19:00

Laos	5–0	Northern Mariana
Sengsavang 53', 56', 61'; Chaleunsouk 79'; Phoutthavong 81'	Report

Laos National Stadium, Vientiane
Attendance: 3,000
Referee: Rysbek Shekerbekov (Kyrgyzstan)

18 September 2015
16:00

Philippines	0–7	Malaysia
	Report	James 26' (o.g.); Haiqal 32'; Iqbal 36'; Izreen 42'; Alif 67', 70'; Arifin 74'

Laos National Stadium, Vientiane
Attendance: 100
Referee: Omar Al-Yaqoubi (Oman)
18 September 2015
19:00

Laos	1–1	Timor-Leste
Salvador 20' (o.g.)	Report	João Pedro 43'

Laos National Stadium, Vientiane
Attendance: 3,000
Referee: Masoud Tufayelieh (Syria)

20 September 2015
16:00

Northern Mariana	2–9	Philippines
Fruit 45+1'; Tenorio 47'	Report	Napolitano 8'; Tacardon 11', 67', 69'; Suba 18', 65', 73'; Ronquillo 41'; Borbon 77'

Laos National Stadium, Vientiane
Attendance: 200
Referee: Rysbek Shekerbekov (Kyrgyzstan)
20 September 2015
19:00

Malaysia	1–1	Laos
Azrin 48'	Report	Chaleunsouk 45+1'

Laos National Stadium, Vientiane
Attendance: 4,000
Referee: Masoud Tufayelieh (Syria)

=== Group H ===
- All matches were held in Singapore.
- Times listed were UTC+8.

Pos	Team	Pld	W	D	L	GF	GA	GD	Pts	Qualification
1	North Korea	3	3	0	0	12	0	+12	9	Final tournament
2	Thailand	3	2	0	1	6	2	+4	6	Final tournament
3	Singapore (H)	3	1	0	2	3	9	−6	3	
4	Cambodia	3	0	0	3	1	11	−10	0	

Source: AFC
Rules for classification: Qualification tiebreakers
(H) Hosts
2 September 2015
17:00

North Korea	7–0	Cambodia
Kung Jin-song 6', 53', 72'; Kwon Nam-hyok 29'; Kim Chung-jin 43', 60'; Kim Kyong-sok 50'	Report

Jalan Besar Stadium, Kallang
Attendance: 100
Referee: Ho Wai Sing (Hong Kong)
2 September 2015
20:00

Thailand	5–0	Singapore
Korawich 18', 59', 73'; Jinnawat 28', 45'	Report

Jalan Besar Stadium, Kallang
Attendance: 945
Referee: Mohamed Al Zarouni (United Arab Emirates)

4 September 2015
17:00

Cambodia	0–1	Thailand
	Report	Korawich 13'

Jalan Besar Stadium, Kallang
Attendance: 247
Referee: Khurram Shahzad (Pakistan)
4 September 2015
20:00

Singapore	0–3	North Korea
	Report	Yun Min 15'; Kye Tam 71'; Ri Song-jin 90'

Jalan Besar Stadium, Kallang
Attendance: 621
Referee: Fu Ming (China)

6 September 2015
17:00

North Korea	2–0	Thailand
Kye Tam 32'; Paek Kwang-min 62'	Report

Jalan Besar Stadium, Kallang
Attendance: 816
Referee: Mohamed Al Zarouni (United Arab Emirates)
6 September 2015
20:00

Singapore	3–1	Cambodia
Kweh 69'; Khairul 81'; Jeferee 88'	Report	Chanthea 48'

Jalan Besar Stadium, Kallang
Attendance: 1,227
Referee: Fu Ming (China)

=== Group I ===
- All matches were held in China.
- Times listed were UTC+8.

Pos	Team	Pld	W	D	L	GF	GA	GD	Pts	Qualification
1	South Korea	3	3	0	0	27	0	+27	9	Final tournament
2	China (H)	3	2	0	1	11	4	+7	6	
3	Chinese Taipei	3	1	0	2	2	8	−6	3	
4	Macau	3	0	0	3	1	29	−28	0	

Source: AFC
Rules for classification: Qualification tiebreakers
(H) Hosts
16 September 2015
14:00

China	1–0	Chinese Taipei
Chen Rong 78'	Report

Yanji People's Stadium, Yanji
Attendance: 786
Referee: Mohd Nafeez Abdul Wahab (Malaysia)
16 September 2015
18:00

South Korea	17–0	Macau
Park Jeong-in 7', 17', 24', 39', 52', 56'; Ko Jun-hee 10', 82'; Lee Dong-ryul 31', 58', 67'; Shin Sang-whi 36', 41', 70', 75'; Son Jae-hyeok 62'; Yu Je-ho 64'	Report

Yanji People's Stadium, Yanji
Attendance: 280
Referee: Vichhika Tuy (Cambodia)

18 September 2015
14:00

Macau	0–10	China
	Report	Zhou Junchen 8', 32'; Zhu Chenjie 17'; Chen Quanjiang 20'; Chen Rong 35'; Wu Zewei 50', 73', 81'; Geng Taili 59'; Sun Qinhan 90+2'

Yanji People's Stadium, Yanji
Attendance: 192
Referee: Pranjal Banerjee (India)
18 September 2015
18:00

Chinese Taipei	0–6	South Korea
	Report	Cheon Seong-hoon 19'; Kim Dong-bum 29', 90+2'; Yong Dong-hyun 37'; Park Chan-bin 63', 70'

Yanji People's Stadium, Yanji
Attendance: 166
Referee: Sukhbir Singh (Singapore)

20 September 2015
14:00

South Korea	4–0	China
Lee Dong-ryul 9'; Yong Dong-hyun 15'; Kim Tae-hwan 51'; Shin Sang-whi 56'	Report

Yanji People's Stadium, Yanji
Attendance: 1,100
Referee: Sukhbir Singh (Singapore)
20 September 2015
18:00

Chinese Taipei	2–1	Macau
Chen Wei-tze 46'; Tsai Cheng-ju 75'	Report	Leung Chi Seng 82'

Yanji People's Stadium, Yanji
Attendance: 66
Referee: Mohd Nafeez Abdul Wahab (Malaysia)

=== Group J ===
- All matches were held in Vietnam.
- Times listed were UTC+7.

Pos	Team	Pld	W	D	L	GF	GA	GD	Pts	Qualification
1	Australia	3	3	0	0	18	1	+17	9	Final tournament
2	Vietnam (H)	3	2	0	1	23	2	+21	6	Final tournament
3	Myanmar	3	1	0	2	12	8	+4	3	
4	Guam	3	0	0	3	0	42	−42	0	

Source: AFC
Rules for classification: Qualification tiebreakers
(H) Hosts
16 September 2015
13:00

Australia	14–0	Guam
Naputi 5' (o.g.); Akbari 15', 46'; Martis 39'; Muratovic 43', 53', 59'; Selden 45+1', 80'; Sweedan 65' (pen.), 79', 90'; Visciglio 70'; Yates 77'	Report

Vietnam YFT Center, Hanoi
Attendance: 60
Referee: Turki Al-Khudhayr (Saudi Arabia)
16 September 2015
15:30

Vietnam	5–1	Myanmar
Trần Văn Đạt 25', 68', 76'; Nguyễn Khắc Khiêm 29'; Nguyễn Huỳnh Sang 33'	Report	Aung Chit Oo Ko Ko 30'

Vietnam YFT Center, Hanoi
Attendance: 100
Referee: Wang Di (China)

18 September 2015
13:00

Myanmar	1–3	Australia
Hein Htet Aung 25'	Report	Brook 2'; Moric 27'; Najjarine 37'

Vietnam YFT Center, Hanoi
Attendance: 100
Referee: Jansen Foo (Singapore)
18 September 2015
15:30

Guam	0–18	Vietnam
	Report	Nguyễn Duy Khiêm 1', 78', 83'; Bùi Anh Đức 8', 30', 32', 38'; Mạch Ngọc Hà 11', 35', 49'; Nguyễn Khắc Khiêm 29'; Nguyễn Hữu Thắng 54'; Uông Ngọc Tiến 63' (pen.); Trần Văn Đạt 67' (pen.), 80'; Nguyễn Trọng Long 70'; Vũ Đình Hai 81', 85'

Vietnam YFT Center, Hanoi
Attendance: 80
Referee: Alongkorn Feemuechang (Thailand)

20 September 2015
13:00

Myanmar	10–0	Guam
Htun Sai 10', 43', 68'; Kyaw Kyaw Htet 16', 33', 35', 73'; Bo Bo Aung 18'; Thet Paing Htoo 26'; Hein Htet Aung 90'	Report

Vietnam YFT Center, Hanoi
Attendance: 50
Referee: Jansen Foo (Singapore)
20 September 2015
15:30

Australia	1–0	Vietnam
Memeti 30'	Report

Vietnam YFT Center, Hanoi
Attendance: 500
Referee: Turki Al-Khudhayr (Saudi Arabia)

=== Group K ===
- All matches were held in Mongolia.
- Times listed were UTC+9.

Pos	Team	Pld	W	D	L	GF	GA	GD	Pts	Qualification
1	Japan	2	2	0	0	24	0	+24	6	Final tournament
2	Hong Kong	2	1	0	1	5	9	−4	3	
3	Mongolia (H)	2	0	0	2	2	22	−20	0	
4	Brunei	0	0	0	0	0	0	0	0	Withdrew

Source: AFC
Rules for classification: Qualification tiebreakers
(H) Hosts
16 September 2015
17:00

Mongolia	0–17	Japan
	Report	Seko 6' (pen.); Kubo 8', 24', 44', 45+1', 60'; Miyashiro 16', 34', 82'; Tanahashi 33'; Hirakawa 37', 72', 79'; Suzuki 42'; Nakamura 49', 56'; Sugawara 51'

MFF Football Centre, Ulaanbaatar
Attendance: 1,830
Referee: Suhaizi Shukri (Malaysia)

18 September 2015
17:00

Hong Kong	5–2	Mongolia
Jonathan Cheung 4' (pen.); Whilborn 45+2'; Chan Ka Shing 63'; Ethan Yeung 76', 85'	Report	Bayarkhuu 68'; Erdenechimeg 89'

MFF Football Centre, Ulaanbaatar
Attendance: 650
Referee: Jasem Ahmad (Kuwait)

20 September 2015
17:00

Japan	7–0	Hong Kong
Nakamura 15'; Sugawara 34'; Tanahashi 71', 90+1'; Seko 75'; Yamada 79'; Hirakawa 84'	Report

MFF Football Centre, Ulaanbaatar
Attendance: 186
Referee: Jameel Abdulhusin (Bahrain)

== Ranking of second-placed teams ==
The ranking among the runner-up team of all groups are determined as follows:

1. Greater number of points obtained in the group matches;
2. Greater goal difference resulting from the group matches;
3. Greater number of goals scored in group matches;
4. Greater number of wins in the group matches;
5. Fewer score calculated according to the number of yellow and red cards received in the group matches (1 point for a single yellow card, 3 points for a red card as a consequence of two yellow cards, 3 points for a direct red card, 4 points for a yellow card followed by a direct red card);
6. Drawing of lots.

In order to ensure equality when comparing the runner-up team of all groups, the results of the matches against the fourth-placed and fifth-placed teams in the groups having four or five teams are ignored due to Groups D, F and K having only three teams after one of the teams in the group withdrew.

Pos	Grp	Team	Pld	W	D	L	GF	GA	GD	Pts	Qualification
1	J	Vietnam	2	1	0	1	5	2	+3	3 (Note: Vietnam and Thailand are ranked by disciplinary points.)	Final tournament
2	H	Thailand	2	1	0	1	5	2	+3	3	Final tournament
3	E	India	2	1	0	1	5	3	+2	3	Final tournament as hosts
4	D	United Arab Emirates	2	1	0	1	8	7	+1	3	Final tournament
5	B	Oman	2	1	0	1	2	2	0	3	Final tournament
6	A	Yemen	2	1	0	1	4	5	−1	3	Qualified in Final tournament for the suspension of Kuwait made by FIFA.
7	C	Tajikistan	2	1	0	1	2	3	−1	3	
8	I	China	2	1	0	1	1	4	−3	3	
9	K	Hong Kong	2	1	0	1	5	9	−4	3	
10	F	Syria	2	0	2	0	2	2	0	2 (Note: Syria and Laos are ranked by disciplinary points.)	
11	G	Laos	2	0	2	0	2	2	0	2	

Source: AFC

== Qualified teams ==
The following 16 teams qualified for the final tournament.

Team	Qualified as	Qualified on	Previous appearances in tournament^{2}
India	Hosts and 3rd best runners-up	3 June 2015	6 (1990, 1996, 2002, 2004, 2008, 2012)
Uzbekistan	Group A winners	20 September 2015	8 (1994, 1996, 2002, 2004, 2008, 2010, **2012**, 2014)
Kyrgyzstan	Group B winners	27 October 2015	0 (debut)
Iraq	Group C winners	20 September 2015	8 (1985, 1988, 1994, 1998, 2004, 2006, 2010, 2012)
Saudi Arabia	Group D winners	20 September 2015	9 (**1985**, 1986, **1988**, 1992, 1994, 2006, 2008, 2012, 2014)
Iran	Group E winners	20 September 2015	9 (1996, 1998, 2000, 2004, 2006, **2008**, 2010, 2012, 2014)
Malaysia	Group G winners	20 September 2015	3 (2004, 2008, 2014)
North Korea	Group H winners	6 September 2015	9 (1986, 1988, 1992, 1998, 2004, 2006, **2010**, 2012, **2014**)
South Korea	Group I winners	20 September 2015	11 (**1986**, 1988, 1990, 1994, 1998, **2002**, 2004, 2006, 2008, 2012, 2014)
Australia	Group J winners	20 September 2015	4 (2008, 2010, 2012, 2014)
Japan	Group K winners	20 September 2015	12 (1988, **1994**, 1996, 1998, 2000, 2002, 2004, **2006**, 2008, 2010, 2012, 2014)
Vietnam	1st best runners-up	20 September 2015	5 (2000, 2002, 2004, 2006, 2010)
Thailand	2nd best runners-up	20 September 2015	9 (1985, 1988, 1992, 1996, **1998**, 2000, 2004, 2012, 2014)
United Arab Emirates	4th best runners-up	20 September 2015	6 (1990, 1992, 1994, 2002, 2008, 2010)
Oman	5th best runners-up	20 September 2015	8 (1994, **1996**, 1998, **2000**, 2004, 2010, 2012, 2014)
Yemen	6th best runners-up	28 May 2016	4 (2002, 2006, 2008, 2012)

^{2} Bold indicates champion for that year. Italic indicates host for that year.

== Goalscorers ==
6 goals

- Park Jeong-in
- Rasul Yuldoshov

5 goals

- Alaa Adnan Jabbar
- Takefusa Kubo
- Izreen Izwandy
- Shin Sang-whi
- João Pedro
- Trần Văn Đạt

4 goals

- Suresh Singh Wangjam
- Rei Hirakawa
- Iqbal Hakem
- Alif Safwan
- Kyaw Kyaw Htet
- Fidel Tacardon
- Hamad Al-Abdan
- Lee Dong-ryul
- Korawich Tasa
- Danilson Araújo
- Majed Rashed
- Abubakir Muydinov
- Bùi Anh Đức

3 goals

- Mirza Muratovic
- Ahmed Sweedan
- Wu Zewei
- Mohammad Sharifi
- Taisei Miyashiro
- Keito Nakamura
- Akito Tanahashi
- Xayyaphon Sengsavang
- Arif Shaqirin
- Htun Sai
- Rejin Subba
- Kung Jin-song
- Mariano Suba
- Dom Lucas
- Abdunozir Abdurakhmonov
- Mạch Ngọc Hà
- Nguyễn Duy Khiêm

2 goals

- Rahmat Akbari
- Jaidon Selden
- Khaled Abdulrahim
- Chen Rong
- Zhou Junchen
- Ethan Yeung Yat Yung
- Aman Chetri
- Mohammad Reza Ghobeishavi
- Ayumu Seko
- Yukinari Sugawara
- Muhannad Abu Awad
- Emir Shigaibaev
- Boualapha Chaleunsouk
- Nilanh Inthapanya
- Nilan Luangsisombath
- Hein Htet Aung
- Dinesh Hemjan
- Kim Chung-jin
- Kye Tam
- Mohammed Al-Khamisi
- Ahmed Eleyan
- Hisham Ali
- Naif Almas
- Kim Dong-bum
- Ko Jun-hee
- Park Chan-bin
- Yong Dong-hyun
- Ziyovuddin Fuzaylov
- Jinnawat Russamee
- Jelito
- Nguyễn Khắc Khiêm
- Vũ Đình Hai
- Waleed Aswad
- Murad Murshed
- Abdulmajeed Sabarah

1 goal

- Amir Ali
- Omid Haidar Saneh
- Lachlan Brook
- Antonis Martis
- Mersim Memeti
- Mark Moric
- Ramy Najjarine
- Andrew Visciglio
- Ryan Yates
- Sarwar Zaman Nipu
- Mohammad Shawon
- Sieng Chanthea
- Chen Quanjiang
- Geng Taili
- Sun Qinhan
- Zhu Chenjie
- Chen Wei-tze
- Tsai Cheng-ju
- Chan Ka Shing
- Jonathan Linux Cheung
- Erik Anders Whilborn
- Gaston D’Silva
- Amarjit Singh Kiyam
- Boris Singh Thangjam
- Komal Thatal
- Mohammad Reza Davari
- Mohammad Ghaderi
- Mohsen Godarzi
- Amir Khodamoradi
- Vahid Namdari
- Erfan Sadeghi
- Mohammad Sardari
- Muntadher Abdulsada
- Mohammed Ridha Jalil
- Ahmed Sartip Omar
- Saleh Mahdi Saleh
- Toichi Suzuki
- Hiroto Yamada
- Laith Hbowal
- Khaled Radi Kourdi
- Jasem Rashed
- Gulzhigit Alykulov
- Gulzhigit Boubaev
- Maksat Dzhakybaliev
- Timur Uulu Orzobek
- Bounphachan Bounkong
- Saya Monlangsy
- Thatthaya Phoutthavong
- Jawad Abdullah
- Mahmoud Kaawar
- Leung Chi Seng
- Nor Amirul
- Azrin Azahari
- Zainul Arifin
- Aliff Haiqal
- Najmi Idham
- Aung Chit Oo Ko Ko
- Bo Bo Aung
- Thet Paing Htoo
- Khosbayar Bayarkhuu
- Bat-Erdene Erdenechimeg
- Manish Bahadur Karki
- Prezen Tamang
- Kim Kyong-sok
- Kwon Nam-hyok
- Paek Kwang-min
- Ri Song-jin
- Yun Min
- Anthony Fruit
- Sunjoon Tenorio
- Mutassim Al-Bakri
- Mohammed Al-Qaidi
- Thamer Al-Zaabi
- Ahmed Aburdaha
- Jelani Borbon
- Kier Napolitano
- Kyle Ronquillo
- Ahmed Al Ganehi
- Mohammad Bahramen
- Saleh Saeed
- Dhari Al-Anazi
- Ali Al-Shaikhi
- Mohammed Mansour Mali
- Abdulaziz Al-Dhuwayhi
- Firas Al-Buraikan
- Khairul Hairie
- Irfan Jeferee
- Glenn Kweh
- Cheon Seong-hoon
- Kim Tae-hwan
- Son Jae-hyeok
- Yu Je-ho
- Mohammad Fares Kanaan
- Mohammad Malta
- Vahdat Hanonov
- Mubindzhon Muminov
- Faridun Nematov
- Avaz Qamchinov
- Yafet Belima
- Filomeno Junior da Costa
- Armindo Vieira
- Orcelio
- Kerim Garabekow
- Abdulla Al-Naqbi
- Ali Saleh
- Sultan Saeed
- Abdulkhay Ismoilov
- Islom Karimov
- Ikhtiyor Kholdorov
- Shukhrat Nematov
- Bakhromjon Soatov
- Oston Urunov
- Nguyễn Hữu Thắng
- Nguyễn Huỳnh Sang
- Nguyễn Trọng Long
- Uông Ngọc Tiến
- Mohammed Al-Hamdani
- Mukhtar Al-Khalil
- Ahmed Hamed Saeed

1 own goal

- Xavier Naputi (against Australia)
- Habib Antoine Baladi (against India)
- Mohamed Azhan Hamid (against Yemen)
- Prichi James (against Malaysia)
- Abdulaziz Al-Malki (against United Arab Emirates)
- Salvador Varela (against Laos)
- Agajan Jumaýew (against Tajikistan)

Source: the-afc.com
