= 2016–17 in Australian soccer =

48th season of national competitive soccer in Australia

Soccer in Australia
- Season: 2016–17

Men's soccer
- A-League Premiership: Sydney FC
- A-League Championship: Sydney FC
- National Premier Leagues: Sydney United 58
- FFA Cup: Melbourne City

Women's soccer
- W-League Premiership: Canberra United
- W-League Championship: Melbourne City

The 2016–17 season was the 48th season of national competitive soccer in Australia and 134th overall.

== Domestic competitions ==
=== A-League ===
Pos	Team	Pld	W	D	L	GF	GA	GD	Pts	Qualification
1	Sydney FC (C)	27	20	6	1	55	12	+43	66	Qualification for 2018 AFC Champions League group stage and Finals series
2	Melbourne Victory	27	15	4	8	49	31	+18	49	Qualification for 2018 AFC Champions League group stage and Finals series
3	Brisbane Roar	27	11	9	7	43	37	+6	42	Qualification for 2018 AFC Champions League second preliminary round and Finals series
4	Melbourne City	27	11	6	10	49	44	+5	39	Qualification for Finals series
5	Perth Glory	27	10	9	8	53	53	0	39	Qualification for Finals series
6	Western Sydney Wanderers	27	8	12	7	35	35	0	36	Qualification for Finals series
7	Wellington Phoenix (Note: Wellington Phoenix cannot qualify for the AFC Champions League as they are not recognised as an AFC club.)	27	8	6	13	41	46	−5	30	
8	Central Coast Mariners	27	6	5	16	31	52	−21	23	
9	Adelaide United	27	5	8	14	25	46	−21	23	
10	Newcastle Jets	27	5	7	15	28	53	−25	22	

Source: A-Leagues
Rules for classification: 1) points; 2) goal difference; 3) number of goals scored.
(C) Champions

==== Finals series ====
Elimination-finals; 21–23 April
Melbourne City	0
Perth Glory	2
Brisbane Roar (p)	1 (6)
Western Sydney Wanderers	1 (5)

Semi-finals; 29–30 April
Sydney FC	3
Perth Glory	0
Melbourne Victory	1
Brisbane Roar	0

Grand final 7 May
Sydney FC (p)	1 (4)
Melbourne Victory	1 (2)

=== W-League ===
Pos	Team	Pld	W	D	L	GF	GA	GD	Pts	Qualification
1	Canberra United	12	7	2	3	33	21	+12	23	Qualification to Finals series
2	Perth Glory	12	7	2	3	22	18	+4	23	Qualification to Finals series
3	Sydney FC	12	7	1	4	22	16	+6	22	Qualification to Finals series
4	Melbourne City (C)	12	6	2	4	19	14	+5	20	Qualification to Finals series
5	Newcastle Jets	12	4	3	5	18	18	0	15	
6	Adelaide United	12	3	5	4	31	26	+5	14	
7	Brisbane Roar	12	4	1	7	15	21	−6	13	
8	Western Sydney Wanderers	12	4	1	7	14	29	−15	13	
9	Melbourne Victory	12	2	3	7	17	28	−11	9	

Source: A-Leagues
Rules for classification: 1) points; 2) goal difference; 3) number of goals scored.
(C) Champions

==== Finals series ====
Semi-finals; 4–5 February
2	Perth Glory	5
3	Sydney FC	1
1	Canberra United	0
4	Melbourne City (a.e.t.)	1

Grand final 12 February
Perth Glory	0
Melbourne City	2

=== National Premier Leagues ===
The 2016 National Premier Leagues Finals series began on 17 September 2016.

Quarter-finals; 17–18 September
(New South Wales) Sydney United 58	5
(South Australia) Adelaide City	4
(Queensland) Brisbane Strikers	3
(Australian Capital Territory) Canberra Olympic	2
(Western Australia) Perth	6
(Tasmania) Devonport City	1
(Victoria (state)) Bentleigh Greens	1
(New South Wales) Edgeworth FC (a.e.t.)	3

Semi-finals; 24–25 September
(New South Wales) Sydney United 58	2
(Queensland) Brisbane Strikers	1
(Western Australia) Perth	0
(New South Wales) Edgeworth FC	1

Grand final 2 October
(New South Wales) Sydney United 58	4
(New South Wales) Edgeworth FC	1

=== National Youth League ===
Conference A
Pos	Team	Pld	W	D	L	GF	GA	GD	Pts	Qualification
1	Melbourne City Youth (C)	8	5	1	2	18	12	+6	16	Qualification to the Grand Final
2	Brisbane Roar Youth	8	4	2	2	21	14	+7	14	
3	Perth Glory Youth	8	4	0	4	12	12	0	12	
4	Adelaide United Youth	8	3	1	4	14	17	−3	10	
5	Melbourne Victory Youth	8	1	2	5	13	23	−10	5	

Source: Foxtel National Youth League
(C) Champions

Conference B
Pos	Team	Pld	W	D	L	GF	GA	GD	Pts	Qualification
1	Sydney FC Youth	8	5	1	2	23	15	+8	16	Qualification to the Grand Final
2	Western Sydney Wanderers Youth	8	4	1	3	26	15	+11	13	
3	Central Coast Mariners Academy	8	3	3	2	15	13	+2	12	
4	Newcastle Jets Youth	8	3	1	4	14	15	−1	10	
5	FFA Centre of Excellence	8	2	0	6	11	31	−20	6	

Source: Foxtel National Youth League

==== Grand final ====
28 January 2017	Melbourne City Youth	3–2	Sydney FC Youth	Gosford
14:00 AEDT	Crowley 22', 90+11' (pen.); Arzani 81' (pen.)	Report	Timotheou 58'; Lokolingoy 68'	Stadium: Central Coast Stadium; Referee: Stephen Laurie

== Domestic cups ==
=== FFA Cup ===
Round of 32
Devonport City	1
Lambton Jaffas	0
North Eastern MetroStars	3 (3)
Bentleigh Greens (p)	3 (4)
Hume City (p)	1 (4)
Marconi Stallions	1 (2)
Newcastle Jets	1
Melbourne Victory	3
Shamrock Rovers Darwin	0
Brisbane Strikers	6
Floreat Athena	1
Melbourne City	2
Far North Queensland	0
Edgeworth FC	3
Western Sydney Wanderers	3
Wellington Phoenix	2
Canberra Olympic	1
Surfers Paradise Apollo	0
Redlands United (a.e.t.)	2
Adelaide United	1
Melbourne Knights	2
Cockburn City	1
Green Gully	2
Central Coast Mariners	1
Blacktown City (a.e.t.)	6
Sydney United 58	2
Bonnyrigg White Eagles	3
Manly United	0
Brisbane Roar	0
Perth Glory	2
Wollongong Wolves	0
Sydney FC	3

Round of 16
Devonport City	0
Bentleigh Greens (a.e.t.)	1
Hume City	0
Melbourne Victory	1
Brisbane Strikers	1
Melbourne City	2
Edgeworth FC	1
Western Sydney Wanderers	5
Canberra Olympic	2
Redlands United	0
Melbourne Knights	1
Green Gully	3
Blacktown City	3
Bonnyrigg White Eagles	0
Perth Glory	0
Sydney FC (a.e.t.)	2

Quarter-finals
Bentleigh Greens	0
Melbourne Victory	2
Melbourne City	4
Western Sydney Wanderers	1
Canberra Olympic	1
Green Gully	0
Blacktown City	0
Sydney FC	3

Semi-finals
Melbourne Victory	0
Melbourne City	2
Canberra Olympic	0
Sydney FC	3

Final
Melbourne City	1
Sydney FC	0

== National teams ==
=== Men's senior ===
==== Friendlies ====
The following is a list of friendlies played by the men's senior national team in 2016–17.

13 June 2017	Australia	0–4	Brazil	Melbourne, Australia
20:05 UTC+10		Report	Souza 1', 90+3'; Silva 62'; Taison 75'	Stadium: Melbourne Cricket Ground; Attendance: 49,874; Referee: Mark Clattenburg (England)

==== FIFA World Cup qualification ====
1 September 2016 Third round	Australia	2–0	Iraq	Perth, Australia
18:30 UTC+8	Luongo 58'; Juric 65'	Report; Report (FIFA); Report (AFC)		Stadium: Perth Oval; Attendance: 18,923; Referee: Alireza Faghani (Iran)

6 September 2016 Third round	United Arab Emirates	0–1	Australia	Abu Dhabi, United Arab Emirates
19:30 UTC+4		Report; Report (FIFA); Report (AFC)	Cahill 75'	Stadium: Mohammed Bin Zayed Stadium; Attendance: 40,893; Referee: Mohd Amirul Izwan Yaacob (Malaysia)

6 October 2016 Third round	Saudi Arabia	2–2	Australia	Jeddah, Saudi Arabia
20:45 UTC+3	Al-Jassim 5'; Al-Shamrani 79'	Report; Report (FIFA); Report (AFC)	Sainsbury 45'; Juric 71'	Stadium: King Abdullah Sports City; Attendance: 51,616; Referee: Ravshan Irmatov (Uzbekistan)

11 October 2016 Third round	Australia	1–1	Japan	Melbourne, Australia
20:00 UTC+11	Jedinak 52' (pen.)	Report; Report (FIFA); Report (AFC)	Haraguchi 5'	Stadium: Docklands Stadium; Attendance: 48,460; Referee: Nawaf Shukralla (Bahrain)

15 November 2016 Third round	Thailand	2–2	Australia	Bangkok, Thailand
19:00 UTC+7	Teerasil 20', 57' (pen.)	Report; Report (FIFA); Report (AFC)	Jedinak 9' (pen.), 65' (pen.)	Stadium: Rajamangala Stadium; Attendance: 36,534; Referee: Fahad Al-Marri (Qatar)

23 March 2017 Third round	Iraq	1–1	Australia	Tehran, Iran
16:30 UTC+4:30	Yasin 76'	Report; Report (FIFA); Report (AFC)	Leckie 39'	Stadium: PAS Stadium; Attendance: 3,270; Referee: Kim Jong-hyeok (South Korea)

28 March 2017 Third round	Australia	2–0	United Arab Emirates	Sydney, Australia
20:00 UTC+11	Irvine 7'; Leckie 78'	Report; Report (FIFA); Report (AFC)		Stadium: Sydney Football Stadium; Attendance: 27,328; Referee: Ahmed Al-Kaf (Oman)

8 June 2017 Third round	Australia	3–2	Saudi Arabia	Adelaide, Australia
19:30 UTC+9:30	Juric 7', 36'; Rogic 64'	Report; Report (FIFA); Report (AFC)	Al-Dawsari 23'; Al-Sahlawi 45+2'	Stadium: Adelaide Oval; Attendance: 29,785; Referee: Ravshan Irmatov (Uzbekistan)

==== FIFA Confederations Cup ====
19 June 2017 Group stage	Australia	2–3	Germany	Sochi, Russia
18:00 UTC+3	Rogic 41'; Juric 56'	Report; Report (FIFA)	Stindl 5'; Draxler 44' (pen.); Goretzka 48'	Stadium: Fisht Olympic Stadium; Attendance: 28,605; Referee: Mark Geiger (United States)

22 June 2017 Group stage	Cameroon	1–1	Australia	Saint Petersburg, Russia
18:00 UTC+3	Zambo Anguissa 45+1'	Report; Report (FIFA)	Milligan 60' (pen.)	Stadium: Krestovsky Stadium; Attendance: 35,021; Referee: Milorad Mažić (Serbia)

25 June 2017 Group stage	Chile	1–1	Australia	Moscow, Russia
18:00 UTC+3	Rodríguez 67'	Report; Report (FIFA)	Troisi 42'	Stadium: Otkrytiye Arena; Attendance: 33,639; Referee: Gianluca Rocchi (Italy)

=== Men's under 23 ===
==== Friendlies ====
The following is a list of friendlies played by the men's under 23 national team in 2016–17.

28 January 2017 2017 Lunar New Year Cup semi-final	FC Seoul (South Korea)	Cancelled	Australia	Hong Kong
15:00 (UTC+8)		Report		Stadium: Hong Kong Stadium

24 March 2017	Australia	1–1	Austria	Murcia, Spain
	54'	Source	Grbić 85'	Stadium: Pinatar Arena

27 March 2017	Australia	0–2	Finland	Murcia, Spain
18:00 (UTC+1)		Source	Savolainen 48', 82'	Stadium: Pinatar Arena; Referee: Rafael Sánchez López (Spain)

=== Men's under-20 ===
==== Friendlies ====
The following is a list of friendlies played by the men's under 20 national team in 2016–17.

21 July 2016 Training match	Central Coast Mariners (Australia)	2–2	Australia	Gosford, Australia
	O'Donovan 16'; Ferreira 45' (pen.)	Report	Prasad 23'; Maia 29'	Stadium: Central Coast Stadium; Attendance: 0 (behind closed doors)

==== AFF U-19 Youth Championship ====
12 September 2016 Group stage	Australia	2–0	Cambodia	Hanoi, Vietnam
19:00 (UTC+7)	Cheng 61' (o.g.); Blackwood 63' (pen.)	Report		Stadium: Vietnam Youth Training Centre; Referee: Chen Hsin-chuan (Chinese Taipei)

14 September 2016 Group stage	Myanmar	0–3	Australia	Hanoi, Vietnam
15:30 (UTC+7)		Report	Pandurevic 18', 28'; Scott 83'	Stadium: Hàng Đẫy Stadium; Referee: Muhammad Nazmi Nasaruddin (Malaysia)

16 September 2016 Group stage	Indonesia	1–3	Australia	Hanoi, Vietnam
15:30 (UTC+7)	35' (pen.)	Report	Prasad; Scott 72'; Shabow 90'	Stadium: Vietnam Youth Training Centre

18 September 2016 Group stage	Australia	1–5	Thailand	Hanoi, Vietnam
19:00 (UTC+7)	Blackwood 14'	Report	Sorawit 18'; Supachai 42', 57', 80'; Worachit 90+2'	Stadium: Vietnam Youth Training Centre; Attendance: 354; Referee: Muhammad Nazmi Nasaruddin (Malaysia)

20 September 2016 Group stage	Laos	1–2	Australia	Hanoi, Vietnam
16:00 (UTC+7)	Santi 45'	Report	Scott 73'; Blackwood 85' (pen.)	Stadium: Vietnam Youth Training Centre

22 September 2016 Semi-final	Vietnam	2–5	Australia	Hanoi, Vietnam
16:00 (UTC+7)	Dĩ 58'; Chinh 68' (pen.)	Report	Blackwood 23', 53'; Shabow 26', 35'; Champness 84'	Stadium: Hàng Đẫy Stadium

24 September 2016 Final	Australia	5–1	Thailand	Hanoi, Vietnam
19:00 (UTC+7)	Baccus 10'; Kuzmanovski 20', 73'; Blackwood 67'; Champness 70'	Report	Jakkit 90+'	Stadium: Hàng Đẫy Stadium

==== AFC U-19 Championship ====
15 October 2016 Group stage	China	0–1	Australia	Riffa, Bahrain
19:30 AST		Report	Shabow 46'	Stadium: Bahrain National Stadium; Attendance: 370; Referee: Jumpei Ida (Japan)

18 October 2016 Group stage	Australia	2–3	Uzbekistan	Isa Town, Bahrain
19:30 AST	Youlley 63' (pen.); Maia 90+3' (pen.)	Report	Abdukhalikov 29'; Ibrokhimov 40', 46'	Stadium: Khalifa Sports City Stadium; Attendance: 58; Referee: Ammar Al-Jeneibi (United Arab Emirates)

21 October 2016 Group stage	Australia	0–0	Tajikistan	Riffa, Bahrain
19:30 AST		Report		Stadium: Bahrain National Stadium; Attendance: 165; Referee: Khamis Al Marri (Qatar)

=== Men's under-17 ===
==== Friendlies ====
The following is a list of friendlies played by the men's under 17 national team in 2016–17.

11 September 2016	Australia	3–2	Uzbekistan	India
	Roberts 5'; D'Arrigo 14'; Bafford 20'	Report	16'; 66'

==== AFF U-16 Youth Championship ====
10 July 2016 Group stage	Myanmar	1–1	Australia	Phnom Penh, Cambodia
15:30 ICT	Hein Htet Aung 66'	Report	Italiano 69'	Stadium: Army Stadium; Referee: Warintorn Sassade (Thailand)

12 July 2016 Group stage	Vietnam	3–0	Australia	Phnom Penh, Cambodia
15:30 ICT	Tiến 18' (pen.); Đạt 28'; Khiêm 78'	Report		Stadium: Olympic Stadium; Referee: Chanketya Thong (Cambodia)

14 July 2016 Group stage	Australia	7–0	Philippines	Phnom Penh, Cambodia
18:30 ICT	Seldon 9'; Muratovic 27', 88', 90+3'; King 36'; Moric 53'; Brook 80'	Report		Stadium: Olympic Stadium; Referee: Xaypaseuth Phongsanit (Laos)

16 July 2016 Group stage	Australia	6–2	Singapore	Phnom Penh, Cambodia
15:30 ICT	Muratovic 31', 76'; Brook 57', 67'; Selden 58'; Moric 89'	Report	Rezza Rezky 45+2'; Mahler 55'	Stadium: Olympic Stadium; Referee: Talaver Linjun (Philippines)

18 July 2016 Group stage	Australia	7–1	Malaysia	Phnom Penh, Cambodia
18:30 ICT	Italiano 4', 83'; Roberts 48', 59', 66', 73'; Brook 63'	Report	Nizaruddin Jazi 29'	Stadium: Olympic Stadium; Referee: Warintorn Sassadee (Thailand)

21 July 2016 Semi-final	Thailand	3–3 (3–5 p)	Australia	Phnom Penh, Cambodia
15:30 ICT	Peerapat 45+3', 47'; Korawich 62'	Report	D'Arrigo 29'; Roberts 57', 90+1'	Stadium: Olympic Stadium; Referee: Xaypaseuth Phongsanit (Laos)
	Penalties
	Sumana (penalty scored); Sahassawas (penalty scored); Peerapat (penalty missed); Arnon (penalty scored)		(penalty scored) Roberts; (penalty scored) Brook; (penalty scored) King; (penalty scored) Pierias; (penalty scored) Bafford

23 July 2016 Final	Vietnam	3–3 (3–5 p)	Australia	Phnom Penh, Cambodia
18:30 ICT	Sang 36'; Việt Cường 56'; Khiêm 77'	Report	Roberts 58' (pen.), 90+1'; Moric 83'	Stadium: Olympic Stadium; Referee: Mohamed Javis (Maldives)
	Penalties
	Tiến (penalty scored); Độ (penalty scored); Kiên (penalty missed); Sang (penalty scored)		(penalty scored) Pierias; (penalty scored) Moric; (penalty scored) Roberts; (penalty scored) Valenti; (penalty scored) Bafford

==== AFC U-16 Championship ====
16 September 2016 Group stage	Australia	0–1	Kyrgyzstan	Bambolim, India
16:00 IST		Report	Kanybekov 76' (pen.)	Stadium: GMC Stadium; Attendance: 100; Referee: Sivakorn Pu-udom (Thailand)

19 September 2016 Group stage	Vietnam	3–2	Australia	Bambolim, India
20:00 IST	Thắng 51', 61'; Duy Khiêm 86'	Report	Roberts 18', 28'	Stadium: GMC Stadium; Attendance: 1,467; Referee: Masoud Tufayelieh (Syria)

22 September 2016 Group stage	Australia	0–6	Japan	Bambolim, India
16:00 IST		Report	Kozuki 4', 82'; Miyashiro 54'; Sehata 56'; Matsumoto 64'; Tanahashi 86'	Stadium: GMC Stadium; Attendance: 430; Referee: Sivakorn Pu-udom (Thailand)

=== Women's senior ===
==== Friendlies ====
The following is a list of friendlies played by the women's senior national team in 2016–17.

23 July 2016	Brazil	3–1	Australia	Fortaleza, Brazil
16:00 BRT	Debinha 61'; Raquel 73'; Darlene 90+4'	Report	Crummer 35'	Stadium: Estádio Presidente Vargas; Referee: Ana Karina Marques (Brazil)

==== Summer Olympics ====
3 August 2016 Group stage	Canada	2–0	Australia	São Paulo, Brazil
15:00 BRT	Beckie 1'; Sinclair 80'	Report		Stadium: Arena Corinthians; Attendance: 20,521; Referee: Stéphanie Frappart (France)

6 August 2016 Group stage	Germany	2–2	Australia	São Paulo, Brazil
18:00 BRT	Däbritz 45+2'; Bartusiak 88'	Report	Kerr 6'; Foord 45'	Stadium: Arena Corinthians; Attendance: 37,475; Referee: Anna-Marie Keighley (New Zealand)

9 August 2016 Group stage	Australia	6–1	Zimbabwe	Salvador, Brazil
16:00 BRT	De Vanna 2'; Polkinghorne 15'; Kennedy 37'; Simon 50'; Heyman 55', 66'	Report	Msipa 90+1'	Stadium: Itaipava Arena Fonte Nova; Attendance: 5,115; Referee: Esther Staubli (Switzerland)

12 August 2016 Quarter-final	Brazil	0–0 (a.e.t.) (7–6 p)	Australia	Belo Horizonte, Brazil
22:00 BRT		Report		Stadium: Mineirão; Attendance: 52,660; Referee: Carol Chenard (Canada)
	Penalties
	Andressa Alves (penalty scored); Andressa (penalty scored); Beatriz (penalty scored); Rafaelle (penalty scored); Marta (penalty missed); Debinha (penalty scored); Monica (penalty scored); Tamires (penalty scored)		(penalty scored) Kellond-Knight; (penalty scored) Alleway; (penalty scored) van Egmond; (penalty scored) Polkinghorne; (penalty missed) Gorry; (penalty scored) Heyman; (penalty scored) Logarzo; (penalty missed) Kennedy

==== Algarve Cup ====
1 March 2017 Group stage	Australia	0–1	Sweden	Albufeira, Portugal
18:30 (WET)		Report	Schelin 60'	Stadium: Albufeira Municipal Stadium; Referee: Yoshimi Yamashita (Japan)

3 March 2017 Group stage	Australia	3–2	Netherlands	Vila Real de Santo António, Portugal
15:00 (WET)	Gielnik 16', 31'; Kennedy 45'	Report	Miedema 75'; Spitse 79'	Stadium: VRS António Sports Complex; Referee: Salima Mukansanga (Rwanda)

6 March 2017 Group stage	China	1–2	Australia	Albufeira, Portugal
15:00 (WET)	Sha. Wang 36'	Report	Gielnik 61'; Carpenter 84'	Stadium: Albufeira Municipal Stadium; Referee: Riem Hussein (Germany)

8 March 2017 3rd place match	Australia	1–1 (1–4 p)	Denmark	Albufeira, Portugal
14:45 (WET)	K. Simon 36'	Report	Harder 80'	Stadium: Albufeira Municipal Stadium; Referee: Ekaterina Koroleva (United States)
	Penalties
	Kellond-Knight (penalty scored); Polkinghorne (penalty missed); Kerr (penalty missed)		(penalty scored) Røddik Hansen; (penalty scored) Petersen; (penalty scored) Larsen; (penalty scored) Troelsgaard

=== Women's under-20 ===
==== AFF Women's Championship ====
27 July 2016 Group stage	Australia	4–0	Malaysia	Mandalay, Myanmar
15:00 MMT	Vine 13', 43'; Maher 88'; Chidiac 89'	Report		Stadium: Mandalarthiri Stadium; Referee: Thi Thu Trang Bui (Vietnam)

29 July 2016 Group stage	Timor-Leste	0–20	Australia	Mandalay, Myanmar
15:00 MMT		Report	Barbieri 2', 10', 29'; Nenadovic 9'; Condon 14', 40', 55'; Wheeler 23'; Ellis 34', 51'; Ammendolia 37', 42', 50'; Ayres 45', 45+1', 59'; Green 53', 87', 90+1'; Lefrevre 65'	Stadium: Mandalarthiri Stadium

31 July 2016 Group stage	Myanmar	1–1	Australia	Mandalay, Myanmar
18:00 MMT	Khin Moe Wai 41'	Report	Plessas 78'	Stadium: Mandalarthiri Stadium; Attendance: 22,500; Referee: Law Bik Chi (Hong Kong)

2 August 2016 Semi-final	Australia	1–2	Thailand	Mandalay, Myanmar
15:00 MMT	Maher 11'	Report	Kanjana 30'; Anootsara 39' (pen.)	Stadium: Mandalarthiri Stadium; Referee: Law Bik Chi (Hong Kong)

4 August 2016 Third place match	Myanmar	1–0	Australia	Mandalay, Myanmar
15:00 MMT	Win Theingi Tun	Report		Stadium: Mandalarthiri Stadium; Attendance: 1,500

==== AFC U-19 Women's Championship qualification ====
2 November 2016	Northern Mariana Islands	0–16	Australia	Nanjing, China
16:00 CST		Report	Vine 3'; Chidiac 5', 23', 35', 47'; Plessas 17'; Siemsen 19', 27', 30', 33', 42', 79', 90+4'; Sayer 25'; Ibini 81', 82'	Stadium: Jiangsu Training Base Stadium; Attendance: 40; Referee: Shiva Yari (Iran)

6 November 2016	Australia	7–1	Jordan	Nanjing, China
16:00 CST	Vine 35'; Siemsen 41', 43', 67'; Chidiac 50'; Sayer 85'; Ibini 64'	Report	Zabian 30'	Stadium: Jiangsu Training Base Stadium; Attendance: 50; Referee: Cong Thi Dung (Vietnam)

=== Women's under-17 ===
==== AFC U-17 Women's Championship qualification ====
25 August 2016	Australia	28–0	Palestine	Hanoi, Vietnam
13:00 ICT	Nevin 1', 7', 12', 20', 27', 27', 32', 32', 34'; Cooney-Cross 4', 72', 83', 89'; Kubin 11', 30'; Sayer 37'; Roestbakken 45+3', 52'; Alsoos 47', 57' (o.g.); Dribbus 54'; Johns 55'; Sakalis 59', 61', 68', 86', 90+1'; Iannella 85'	Report		Stadium: Vietnam Youth Football Training Centre; Attendance: 100; Referee: Nami Imaizumi (Japan)

27 August 2016	Australia	14–0	Hong Kong	Hanoi, Vietnam
13:00 ICT	Vignes 3', 47'; Galabadaarachchi 6', 36', 83'; Sayer 18', 32'; Kubin 24', 45+2', 49', 64'; Meads 53'; Kell 77'; Hughes 81'	Report		Stadium: Vietnam Youth Football Training Centre; Attendance: 67; Referee: Thein Thein Aye (Myanmar)

29 August 2016	Iraq	0–8	Australia	Hanoi, Vietnam
15:00 ICT		Report	Sakalis 10', 30', 42'; Dribbus 36'; Roestbakken 44'; Galabadaarachchi 49'; Arens 67'; Cooney-Cross 80'	Stadium: Vietnam Youth Football Training Centre; Attendance: 70; Referee: Nami Imaizumi (Japan)

1 September 2016	Australia	6–0	Vietnam	Hanoi, Vietnam
18:30 ICT	Kubin 4', 13'; Cooney-Cross 57'; Vignes 79'; Nevin 86'; Rose 88'	Report		Stadium: Vietnam Youth Football Training Centre; Attendance: 450; Referee: Kim Sook-hee (South Korea)

3 September 2016	Uzbekistan	1–9	Australia	Hanoi, Vietnam
15:00 ICT	Turaeva 85'	Report	Sakalis 23' (pen.), 38', 69'; Galabadaarachchi 26', 31'; Hristodoulou 45'; Khikmatova 75' (o.g.); Vignes 78'; Roestbakken 90+2'	Stadium: Vietnam Youth Football Training Centre; Attendance: 40; Referee: Thein Thein Aye (Myanmar)

== Retirements ==
- 4 July 2016: Chris Naumoff, 21, former Sydney FC midfielder.
- 22 July 2016: Nick Carle, 34, former Australia, Sydney Olympic, Marconi Stallions, Newcastle Jets and Sydney FC midfielder.
- 27 July 2016: Brianna Davey, 21, former Australia, Melbourne Victory and Melbourne City goalkeeper.
