= Central Coast Mariners FC league record by opponent =

Central Coast Mariners FC is an Australian professional association football club based in Gosford, on the Central Coast of New South Wales, which competes in the top tier of Australian football (soccer), for the 2016–17 season. The club was formed in 2004, and were the only regional club included in the A-League's inaugural season in 2005–06. They have played in all 17 A-League Men seasons.

Central Coast Mariners' first team record against other clubs in the A-League is listed below, the Mariners having taken part in every season. The club's first match was against Perth Glory, and they met their 15th and most recent opponent, Auckland FC in the 2024-25 A-League season. The team that Central Coast Mariners have played most in league competition is Brisbane Roar, who they first met in the 2005–06 A-League season; the 32 defeats from 56 meetings is more than they have lost against any other club. Newcastle Jets have drawn 18 league encounters with the Central Coast Mariners, more than any other club. Central Coast Mariners have recorded more league victories against Adelaide United than any other club, having beaten them 27 times out of 61 attempts.

== Key ==
- The table includes results of matches played by Central Coast Mariners in the A-League Men.
- The name used for each opponent is the name they had when Central Coast most recently played a league match against them. Results against each opponent include results against that club under any former name. For example, results against Melbourne City include matches played against Melbourne Heart (2009–2014).
- The columns headed "First" and "Last" contain the first and most recent seasons in which Central Coast played league matches against each opponent.
- P = matches played; W = matches won; D = matches drawn; L = matches lost; Win% = percentage of total matches won
- † Clubs with this background and symbol in the "Opponent" column are Central Coast Mariners' divisional rivals in the current season.
- ‡ Clubs with this background and symbol in the "Opponent" column are defunct.

== All-time league record ==
Statistics correct as at 22 November 2026

Central Coast Mariners FC league record by opponent
Club	P	W	D	L	P	W	D	L	P	W	D	L	Win%	First	Last	Notes
Club	Home				Away				Total				Win%	First	Last	Notes
Adelaide United †	32	18	3	11	31	10	6	15	63	28	9	26	44.44	2005–06	2025–26	
Auckland FC †	2	0	0	2	3	1	2	0	5	1	2	2	20.00	2024–25	2025–26	
Brisbane Roar †	33	5	7	21	33	10	9	14	66	15	16	35	22.73	2005–06	2025–26	(Note: Record against Queensland Roar included)
Gold Coast United	6	2	3	1	4	1	2	1	10	3	5	2	30.00	2009–10	2010–11	
Macarthur FC †	9	3	3	3	7	5	1	1	16	8	4	4	50.00	2020–21	2025–26	
Melbourne City †	21	10	7	4	23	5	4	14	44	15	11	18	34.09	2010–11	2025–26	(Note: Record against Melbourne Heart included)
Melbourne Victory †	30	10	10	10	29	4	8	17	60	15	18	27	25.00	2005–06	2026–27	
New Zealand Knights ‡	3	1	1	1	3	3	0	0	6	4	1	1	66.67	2005–06	2006–07	
Newcastle Jets †	35	15	11	9	33	12	9	12	69	27	21	21	39.13	2005–06	2026–27	
North Queensland Fury ‡	4	2	2	0	2	2	0	0	6	4	2	0	66.67	2009–10	2010–11	
Perth Glory †	31	18	8	5	29	8	8	13	61	26	16	19	42.62	2005–06	2026–27	
Sydney FC †	29	10	7	12	32	7	5	20	61	17	12	32	27.87	2005–06	2026–27	
Wellington Phoenix †	23	10	4	9	30	9	8	13	53	19	12	22	35.85	2007–08	2026–27	
Western Sydney Wanderers †	17	6	2	9	21	6	7	8	39	12	10	17	30.77	2012–13	2025–26	
Western United	7	6	0	1	7	2	2	3	14	8	2	4	57.14	2019–20	2024–25	
