= 2016 AFF U-16 Youth Championship =

2016 AFF U-16 Youth Championship ព្រឹត្តិការណ៍ AFF U16 Championship 2016
Tournament details
- Host country: Cambodia
- City: Phnom Penh
- Dates: 10–23 July
- Teams: 11 (from 1 sub-confederation)
- Venue: 2 (in 1 host city)

Final positions
- Champions: Australia (2nd title)
- Runners-up: Vietnam
- Third place: Thailand
- Fourth place: Cambodia

Tournament statistics
- Matches played: 29
- Goals scored: 102 (3.52 per match)
- Top scorer(s): (Australia) John Roberts (8 goals)
- Fair play award: Cambodia

The 2016 AFF U-16 Youth Championship was the 11th edition of the AFF U-16 Youth Championship, organised by the ASEAN Football Federation for the men's under-16 national teams of Southeastern Asia. It is hosted by Cambodia for the third time after the 2007 AFF U-17 Youth Championship and 2015 AFF U-16 Youth Championship, and won by Australia. It is played between 10 and 23 July 2016.

A total of 11 teams played in the tournament. The Indonesian Football Association was suspended by football's world governing body FIFA because of government interference in the Southeast Asian country's national league on 30 May 2015 but this was lifted on 13 May 2016. However, Indonesia withdrew from the tournament.

Players born on or after 1 January 2000 are eligible to compete in the tournament. Each team can register a maximum of 23 players (minimum three of whom must be goalkeepers).

== Participant teams ==
All twelve member associations of the ASEAN Football Federation were set to take part in the tournament featuring three groups of four teams, but with Indonesia's suspension, they were omitted and the AFF reverted to two groups featuring six and five teams.

Team	Association	App	Previous best performance
Cambodia (H)	FF Cambodia	7th	Group stage (6 times)
Australia	FF Australia	5th	Winners (2008)
Brunei	FA Brunei DS	5th	Group stage (4 times)
Laos	Lao FF	9th	Runners-up (2002, 2007, 2011)
Malaysia	FA Malaysia	8th	Winners (2013)
Myanmar	Myanmar FF	8th	Winners (2002, 2005)
Philippines	Philippine FF	5th	Group stage (4 times)
Singapore	FA Singapore	7th	Fourth place (2008, 2011)
Thailand	FA Thailand	7th	Winners (2007, 2011, 2015)
Timor-Leste	FF Timor-Leste	4th	Third place (2010)
Vietnam	Vietnam FF	9th	Winners (2006, 2010)

== Venues ==
The two venues to host matches are Olympic Stadium and Army Stadium in Phnom Penh. The matches of Group A will hold in Olympic Stadium and Army Stadium, the matches of Group B will hold in Olympic Stadium and the matches of Knockout stage will hold in Olympic Stadium.

Phnom Penh
Olympic Stadium	Location of stadiums of the 2016 AFF U-16 Youth Championship	Army Stadium
Capacity: 50,000	Location of stadiums of the 2016 AFF U-16 Youth Championship	Capacity: 7,000

== Schedule and draw ==
The following groups were drawn at the AFF Council meeting in Da Nang, Vietnam on 13 March 2016.

=== Seeding ===
The seeding are based on the 2015 AFF U-16 Youth Championship (shown in parentheses below)The 12 teams are seeded into Six pots:

- Pot 1 contained the teams ranked 1–2.
- Pot 2 contained the teams ranked 3–4.
- Pot 3 contained the teams ranked 5–6.
- Pot 4 contained the teams ranked 7–8.
- Pot 5 contained the teams ranked 9–10.
- Pot 6 contained the teams ranked 11.

Each group is contain one team from each of the six pots.

Pos	Team	Pld	W	D	L	GF	GA	GD	Pts
1	Thailand	7	6	0	1	16	4	+12	18
2	Myanmar	6	4	0	2	10	8	+2	12
3	Australia	6	5	0	1	36	9	+27	15
4	Laos	7	4	1	2	12	15	−3	13
5	Timor-Leste	4	1	1	2	7	9	−2	4
6	Singapore	4	1	1	2	7	12	−5	4
7	Cambodia	4	1	1	2	1	7	−6	4
8	Malaysia	4	1	0	3	3	8	−5	3
9	Vietnam	4	0	2	2	4	7	−3	2
10	Brunei	4	0	0	4	2	11	−9	0
11	Philippines	4	0	0	4	3	16	−13	0

=== The draw ===
Pot 1	Pot 2	Pot 3	Pot 4	Pot 5	Pot 6
Thailand (1); Myanmar (2)	Australia (3); Laos (4)	Timor-Leste (5); Singapore (6)	Cambodia (7); Malaysia (8)	Vietnam (9); Brunei (10)	Philippines (11)

== Group stage ==
The top two teams of each group advance to the semi-finals.

Tiebreakers

The teams are ranked according to points (3 points for a win, 1 point for a draw, 0 points for a loss). If tied on points, tiebreakers are applied in the following order:

1. Goal difference in all the group matches;
2. Greater number of goals scored in all the group matches;
3. Result of the direct match between the teams concerned;
4. Kicks from the penalty mark if the teams concerned are still on the field of play.
5. Lowest score using Fair Play Criteria;
6. Drawing of lots.
- All matches held in Phnom Penh, Cambodia.
- All times are local, UTC+7.

=== Group A ===
Pos	Team	Pld	W	D	L	GF	GA	GD	Pts	Qualification
1	Vietnam	5	4	1	0	17	4	+13	13	Knockout stage
2	Australia	5	3	1	1	21	7	+14	10	Knockout stage
3	Myanmar	5	2	1	2	9	8	+1	7	
4	Malaysia	5	2	1	2	6	12	−6	7	
5	Singapore	5	1	0	4	6	16	−10	3	
6	Philippines	5	0	2	3	6	18	−12	2	

Source: aseanfootball.org
10 July 2016
15:30

Myanmar	1–1	Australia
Hein Htet Aung 66'	Report	Italiano 69'

Army Stadium, Phnom Penh
Referee: Warintorn Sassade (Thailand)
10 July 2016
15:30

Philippines	1–3	Singapore
Tacardon 82'	Report	Rezza Rezky 24'; Joel Chew 51'; Syahadat Masnawi 64'

Olympic Stadium, Phnom Penh
Referee: Xaypaseuth Phongsanit (Laos)
10 July 2016
18:30

Malaysia	0–3	Vietnam
	Report	Nguyễn Khắc Khiêm 6'; Nguyễn Trọng Long 68'; Nguyễn Hữu Thắng 90+4'

Olympic Stadium, Phnom Penh
Referee: Vichhika Tuy (Cambodia)

12 July 2016
15:30

Vietnam	3–0	Australia
Uông Ngọc Tiến 18' (pen.); Trần Văn Đạt 28'; Nguyễn Khắc Khiêm 78'	Report

Olympic Stadium, Phnom Penh
Referee: Chanketya Thong (Cambodia)
12 July 2016
18:30

Singapore	1–4	Myanmar
Daniel Matin 90+2'	Report	Aung Wanna Soe 13', 40'; Win Naing Tun 42'; Ye Yint Aung 81'

Olympic Stadium, Phnom Penh
Referee: Mohamed Javis (Maldives)
12 July 2016
21:30

Philippines	2–2	Malaysia
Tacardon 34'; Wilson 44'	Report	Alif Safwan 30', 46'

Olympic Stadium, Phnom Penh
Referee: Amdillah Zainuddin (Brunei)

14 July 2016
15:30

Singapore	0–2	Malaysia
	Report	Aiman Zaidi 15'; Faris Zabri (red card) 21'; Izreen Izwandy 70'

Army Stadium, Phnom Penh
Referee: Tuy Vichhika (Cambodia)
14 July 2016
15:30

Myanmar	1–5	Vietnam
Htet Phyoe Wai 15'	Report	Nguyễn Khắc Khiêm 33'; Nguyễn Hữu Thắng 45', 79'; Nguyễn Trọng Long 52'; Uông Ngọc Tiến 64'

Olympic Stadium, Phnom Penh
Referee: Warintorn Sassadee (Thailand)
14 July 2016
18:30

Australia	7–0	Philippines
Seldon 9'; Muratovic 27', 88', 90+3'; King 36'; Moric 53'; Brook 80'	Report

Olympic Stadium, Phnom Penh
Referee: Xaypaseuth Phongsanit (Laos)

16 July 2016
15:30

Vietnam	3–3	Philippines
Nguyễn Trọng Long 45+1'; Nguyễn Khắc Khiêm 62'; Vũ Quang Độ 90+3'	Report	Maquiling 27'; Tacardon 73' (pen.), 81'

Army Stadium, Phnom Penh
Referee: Amdillah Zainuddin (Brunei)
16 July 2016
15:30

Australia	6–2	Singapore
Muratovic 31', 76'; Brook 57', 67'; Selden 58'; Moric 89'	Report	Rezza Rezky 45+2'; Mahler 55'

Olympic Stadium, Phnom Penh
Referee: Talaver Linjun (Philippines)
16 July 2016
18:30

Malaysia	1–0	Myanmar
Izreen Izwandy (yellow card) 20' (yellow-red card) 65'; Nizaruddin Jazi 85'	Report

Olympic Stadium, Phnom Penh
Referee: Chanketya Thong (Cambodia)

18 July 2016
08:00

Singapore	0–3	Vietnam
	Report	Vũ Đình Hai 13'; Nguyễn Hữu Thắng 25'; Nguyễn Trần Việt Cường 59'

Olympic Stadium, Phnom Penh
Referee: Tuy Vichhika (Cambodia)
18 July 2016
15:30

Myanmar	3–0	Philippines
Win Naing Tun 60'; Bo Bo Aung 67'; Hein Htet Aung 81'	Report

Army Stadium, Phnom Penh
Referee: Amdillah Zainuddin (Brunei)
18 July 2016
18:30

Australia	7–1	Malaysia
Italiano 4', 83'; Roberts 48', 59', 66', 73'; Brook 63'	Report	Nizaruddin Jazi 29'

Olympic Stadium, Phnom Penh
Referee: Warintorn Sassadee (Thailand)

=== Group B ===
Pos	Team	Pld	W	D	L	GF	GA	GD	Pts	Qualification
1	Thailand	4	4	0	0	12	0	+12	12	Knockout stage
2	Cambodia (H)	4	3	0	1	8	7	+1	9	Knockout stage
3	Laos	4	1	1	2	6	6	0	4	
4	Timor-Leste	4	1	1	2	4	7	−3	4	
5	Brunei	4	0	0	4	0	10	−10	0	

Source: aseanfootball.org
(H) Hosts
11 July 2016
15:30

Brunei	0–3	Timor-Leste
	Report	Ximenes 26'; Da Conceicao 43'; Gusmao 50'

Olympic Stadium, Phnom Penh
Referee: Clifford Daypuyat (Philippines)
11 July 2016
18:30

Cambodia	3–1	Laos
Chanthea 42', 71'; Kakada 45+1'	Report	Bounkong 82'

Olympic Stadium, Phnom Penh
Referee: Thant Zin Oo (Myanmar)

13 July 2016
15:30

Timor-Leste	0–3	Thailand
	Report	Peerapat 2'; Korawich 9'; Reis 45+1' (o.g.)

Olympic Stadium, Phnom Penh
Referee: Talaver Linjun (Philippines)
13 July 2016
18:30

Brunei	0–2	Cambodia
	Report	Sopheaktra 38', 76'

Olympic Stadium, Phnom Penh
Referee: Clifford Daypuyat (Philippines)

15 July 2016
15:30

Thailand	1–0	Brunei
Arnon 20'	Report

Olympic Stadium, Phnom Penh
Referee: Thant Zin Oo (Myanmar)
15 July 2016
18:30

Laos	1–1	Timor-Leste
Bounkong 86'	Report	Keodoungdeth 25' (o.g.)

Olympic Stadium, Phnom Penh
Referee: Mohamed Javiz (Maldives)

17 July 2016
15:30

Brunei	0–4	Laos
	Report	Bounkong 4', 83'; Inthapanya 11', 43'

Olympic Stadium, Phnom Penh
Referee: Thant Zin Oo (Myanmar)
17 July 2016
18:30

Cambodia	0–6	Thailand
	Report	Korawich 40', 90'; Sumana 53' (pen.); Peerapat 68'; Jinnawat 73', 83'

Olympic Stadium, Phnom Penh
Referee: Clifford Daypuyat (Philippines)

19 July 2016
15:30

Laos	0–2	Thailand
	Report	Nititorn 35'; Jinnawat 90+1'

Olympic Stadium, Phnom Penh
Referee: Talaver Linjun (Philippines)
19 July 2016
18:30

Timor-Leste	0–3	Cambodia
	Report	Safy 6'; Piseth 55', 59'

Olympic Stadium, Phnom Penh
Referee: Mohamed Javis (Maldives)

== Knockout stage ==
In the knockout stage, penalty shoot-out is used to decide the winner if necessary (extra time is not used).

=== Bracket ===
Semi-finals
21 July – Phnom Penh
Vietnam	1
Cambodia	0
21 July – Phnom Penh
Thailand	3 (3)
Australia (p)	3 (5)

Final
23 July – Phnom Penh
Vietnam	3 (3)
Australia (p)	3 (5)
Third place match
23 July – Phnom Penh
Cambodia	0
Thailand	3

=== Semi-finals ===
21 July 2016
15:30

Thailand	3–3	Australia
Peerapat 45+3', 47'; Korawich 62'	Report	D'Arrigo 29'; Roberts 57', 90+1'
Penalties
Sumana (penalty scored); Sahassawas (penalty scored); Peerapat (penalty missed); Arnon (penalty scored)	3–5	(penalty scored) Roberts; (penalty scored) Brook; (penalty scored) King; (penalty scored) Pierias; (penalty scored) Bafford

Olympic Stadium, Phnom Penh
Referee: Xaypaseuth Phongsanit (Laos)

21 July 2016
18:30

Vietnam	1–0	Cambodia
Nguyễn Khắc Khiêm 28'	Report

Olympic Stadium, Phnom Penh
Referee: Clifford Daypuyat (Philippines)

=== Third place match ===
23 July 2016
15:30

Cambodia	0–3	Thailand
	Report	Peerapat 13'; Korawich 21'; Arnon 38'

Olympic Stadium, Phnom Penh
Referee: Thant Zin Oo (Myanmar)

=== Final ===
23 July 2016
18:30

Vietnam	3–3	Australia
Nguyễn Huỳnh Sang 36'; Nguyễn Trần Việt Cường 56'; Nguyễn Khắc Khiêm 77'	Report	Roberts 58' (pen.), 90+1'; Moric 83'
Penalties
Uông Ngọc Tiến (penalty scored); Vũ Quang Độ (penalty scored); Nguyễn Xuân Kiên (penalty missed); Nguyễn Huỳnh Sang (penalty scored)	3–5	(penalty scored) Pierias; (penalty scored) Moric; (penalty scored) Roberts; (penalty scored) Valenti; (penalty scored) Bafford

Olympic Stadium, Phnom Penh
Referee: Mohamed Javis (Maldives)

== Winner ==
2016 AFF U-16 Youth Championship Winners

Australia
Second title

== Final ranking ==
As per statistical convention in football, matches decided in extra time are counted as wins and losses, while matches decided by penalty shoot-outs are counted as draws.

Pos	Team	Pld	W	D	L	GF	GA	GD	Pts	Final result
1	Australia	7	3	3	1	27	13	+14	12	Champions
2	Vietnam	7	5	2	0	21	7	+14	17	Runners-up
3	Thailand	6	5	1	0	18	3	+15	16	Third place
4	Cambodia (H)	6	3	0	3	8	11	−3	9	Fourth place
5	Laos	4	1	1	2	6	6	0	4	
6	Myanmar	5	2	1	2	9	8	+1	7	
7	Malaysia	5	2	1	2	6	12	−6	7	
8	Timor-Leste	4	1	1	2	4	7	−3	4	
9	Singapore	5	1	0	4	6	16	−10	3	
10	Brunei	4	0	0	4	0	10	−10	0	
11	Philippines	5	0	2	3	6	18	−12	2	

(H) Hosts

== Goalscorers ==
8 goals

- (Australia) John Roberts

6 goals

- (Vietnam) Nguyễn Khắc Khiêm

5 goals

- (Australia) Mirza Muratovic
- (Thailand) Korrawit Tasa
- (Thailand) Peerapat Kaminthong

4 goals

- (Australia) Lachlan Brook
- (Laos) Bounphachan Bounkong
- (Philippines) Fidel Tacardon
- (Vietnam) Nguyễn Hữu Thắng

3 goals

- (Australia) Jacob Italiano
- (Australia) Mark Moric
- (Thailand) Jinnawat Russamee
- (Vietnam) Nguyễn Trọng Long

2 goals

- (Australia) Jaidon Seldon
- (Cambodia) Sieng Chanthea
- (Cambodia) Mao Piseth
- (Cambodia) Sean Sopheaktra
- (Laos) Nilan Inthapanya
- (Malaysia) Muhammad Alif Safwan Sallahuddin
- (Malaysia) Muhammad Nizaruddin Jazi
- (Myanmar) Aung Wanna Soe
- (Myanmar) Hein Htet Aung
- (Myanmar) Win Naing Tun
- (Singapore) Rezza Rezky Ramadhani bin Jacobjan
- (Thailand) Arnon Prasongporn
- (Vietnam) Nguyễn Trần Việt Cường
- (Vietnam) Uông Ngọc Tiến

1 goal

- (Australia) Joel King
- (Australia) Louis D'Arrigo
- (Cambodia) Sin Kakada
- (Cambodia) Yue Safy
- (Malaysia) Muhammad Izreen Izwandy
- (Malaysia) Muhammad Aiman Zaidi
- (Myanmar) Bo Bo Aung
- (Myanmar) Htet Phyoe Wai
- (Myanmar) Ye Yint Aung
- (Philippines) Maquiling Leo Gabriel
- (Philippines) Robert Wilson
- (Singapore) Mohamed Daniel Matin Mohamad Azlan
- (Singapore) Mahler William
- (Singapore) Syahadat Masnawi
- (Singapore) Joel Chew Joon Herng
- (Timor-Leste) Expedito Da Conceicao
- (Timor-Leste) Osorio Gusmao
- (Timor-Leste) Juvencio Ximenes
- (Thailand) Nititorn Supramarn
- (Thailand) Sumana Salapphet
- (Vietnam) Nguyễn Huỳnh Sang
- (Vietnam) Trần Văn Đạt
- (Vietnam) Vũ Đình Hai
- (Vietnam) Vũ Quang Độ

1 own goal

- (Laos) Khampanhgna Keodoungdeth (against Timor-Leste)
- (Timor-Leste) Nelson Reis (against Thailand)

== Broadcasting ==
2016 AFF U-16 Youth Championship television broadcasters in Southeast Asia
Country	Broadcast network	Television station
Australia		
Brunei		
Cambodia	MYTV	Cambodian Television Network
Indonesia		
Laos		
Malaysia		
Myanmar	MWD	
Philippines		
Singapore		
Thailand	True Visions	
Timor-Leste		
Vietnam		
2016 AFF U-16 Youth Championship international television broadcasters
Asia-wide		
