= List of Melbourne City FC (women) head coaches =

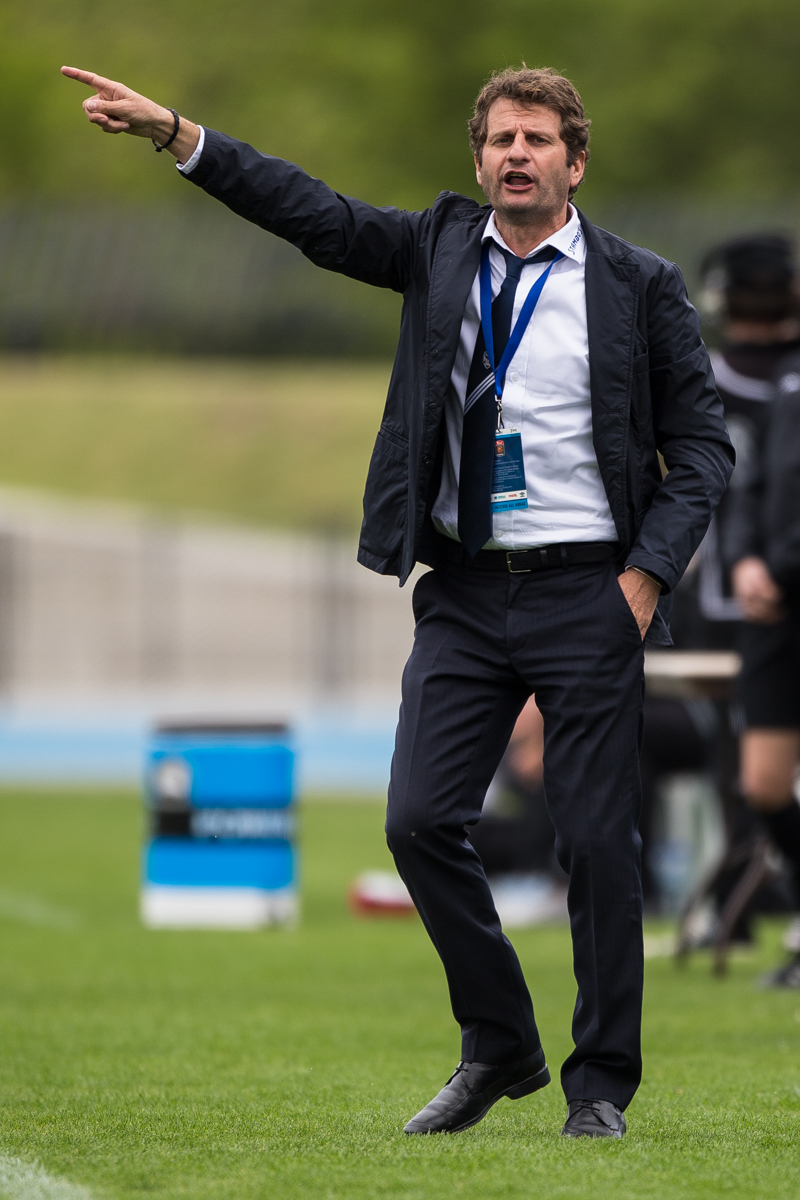
Joe Montemurro, the first Melbourne City (women) head coach, has the equal most honours won with the club.

Melbourne City Football Club (women) is an Australian professional women's association football club based in Cranbourne East, Melbourne. The club was formed in Bundoora in 2015.

== Background ==
There have been four permanent and one caretaker head coach of Melbourne City (women) since 2015; Joe Montemurro was the first to manage the club. The most successful people to manage Melbourne City (women) is Joe Montemurro and Rado Vidošić, who both won two A-League Women premierships and two A-League Women championships, between 2016 and 2020. Rado Vidošić is the club's longest-serving manager.

This chronological list comprises all those who have held the position of head coach of the first team of Melbourne City (women) since their foundation in 2015. Each head coach's entry includes his/her dates of tenure and the club's overall competitive record (in terms of matches won, drawn and lost), honours won and significant achievements while under his/her care. Caretaker managers are included, where known, as well as those who have been in permanent charge.

== Head coach history ==
Within the foundation of the club in the W-League (now A-League Women) in 2015, Joe Montemurro was confirmed the first head coach following the conclusion of the NPL season, with five months to spare in immediate plans for squad assembling before their inaugural season. He led the club to a double by full winning regular season and a Grand Final win against Sydney FC. During the 2016–17 season, Montemurro left to be the interim assistant coach for the men's team hence Welsh international player-coach Jess Fishlock replacing the women's head coach role in January 2017, leading her side to the championship of the 2016–17 W-League against the Perth Glory. Patrick Kisnorbo took the role around the start of the 2017–18 season in which he would lead the club to another championship in 2018. Kisnorbo who then moved to the men's assistant coach (and eventually men's head coach), had his women's head coach role swapped by Rado Vidošić in June 2018, where the next three full seasons he would be in charge and leading the club to another double in the 2019–20 season. In November 2022, Rado Vidošić's head coach role was swapped by his son Dario, due to Rado heading for caretaker role for the men's team in replacement of Kisnorbo.

== Head coaches ==
- Head coach dates and nationalities are sourced from worldfootball.net. Statistics are sourced of named head coaches are sourced from ALeagueStats.com. Names of caretaker head coaches are supplied where known, and periods of caretaker management are highlighted in italics and marked † or ‡, depending on the scenario. Win percentage is rounded to two decimal places.
- Only first-team competitive matches are counted. Wins, losses and draws are results at the final whistle; the results of penalty shoot-outs are not counted.
- Statistics are complete up to and including the match played on 21 May 2025.

Key

- M = matches played; W = matches won; D = matches drawn; L = matches lost; GF = Goals for; GA = Goals against; Win % = percentage of total matches won
- † Head coaches with this background and symbol in the "Name" column are italicised to denote caretaker appointments.
- ‡ Head coaches with this background and symbol in the "Name" column are italicised to denote caretaker appointments promoted to full-time head coach.

List of Melbourne City FC (A-League Women) head coaches
Name	Nationality	From	To	M	W	D	L	GF	GA	Win %	Honours	Notes
Joe Montemurro	Australia	1 July 2015	4 January 2017	22	18	1	3	55	12	81.82	A-League Women premiers: 2015–16; A-League Women champions: 2016	
Jess Fishlock	Wales	5 January 2017	31 March 2017	6	4	1	1	9	4	66.67	A-League Women champions: 2017	
Patrick Kisnorbo	Australia	1 July 2017	30 June 2018	14	8	2	4	24	15	57.14	A-League Women champions: 2018	
Rado Vidošić	Australia	1 July 2018	22 November 2022	55	35	3	17	100	60	63.64	A-League Women premiers: 2019–20; A-League Women champions: 2020	
Dario Vidošić	Australia	23 November 2022	10 July 2024	43	22	8	13	81	46	51.16	A-League Women premiers: 2023–24	
Michael Matricciani	Australia	21 August 2024	Present	30	21	8	1	71	26	70.00	A-League Women premiers: 2024–25	
