= Joel Chew =

Singaporean footballer (born 2000)

Personal information
- Full name: Joel Chew Joon Herng
- Date of birth: 9 February 2000 (age 26)
- Place of birth: Singapore
- Height: 1.68 m (5 ft 6 in)
- Position: Midfielder

Team information
- Current team: Tampines Rovers
- Number: 16

Youth career
- National Football Academy
- Young Lions

Senior career*
Years	Team	Apps	(Gls)
2019–	Tampines Rovers	50	(2)
2021–2022	→ Young Lions (loan)	40	(1)

International career^{‡}
2015–2016	Singapore U16	10	(1)
2018	Singapore U19	5	(0)
2021–2022	Singapore U23	6	(0)
2023–	Singapore	8	(0)
- * Club domestic league appearances and goals as of 13 August 2022 ‡ National team caps and goals as of 9 September 2025

Joel Chew Joon Herng (born 9 February 2000) is a Singaporean professional footballer who plays as a midfielder for Singapore Premier League club Tampines Rovers and the Singapore national team.

== Early career ==
Joel beats seven other nominees Marc Ryan Tan and Zikos Chua (both NFA U-15), Khairul Ikhwan Karim and Aizal Murhamdani Ahmad (both NFA U-16), NFA U-17's Rezza Rezky and NFA U-18 duo Danial Syafiq Mustaffa and Nazhiim Harman to win the Dollah Salleh award in 2017.

== Club career ==
=== Tampines Rovers ===
Joel signed with Singapore Premier League club Tampines Rovers in 2019. Joel scored in the 2019 Singapore Cup Final where he would go on to lift the cup.

On 24 January 2022. Joel signed a 5-year contract extension with Tampines Rovers which will last until December 2027.

Joel returned to Tampines in 2023 after having completed his National Service (NS) duties.

=== Loan to Young Lions ===
Joel then signed a loan deal with the Young Lions in 2021 while serving his National Service.

== International career ==
=== Youth ===
He was called up to the 2018 AFF U-19 Youth Championship squad.

=== Senior ===
On 23 March 2023, Joel made his international debut against Hong Kong, coming on as a substitute in the last 10 minute of the game.

== Style of play ==
Former Singapore U17 national team coach, Takuya Inoue has described Joel as someone who is "small in size, but with good endurance and agility." Joel is known for his playmaking and set piece taking.

== Career statistics ==
=== Club ===
As of match played 13 March 2023.

Appearances and goals by club, season and competition
Club	Season	League			National Cup		League Cup		Asia		Total	
Club	Season	Division	Apps	Goals	Apps	Goals	Apps	Goals	Apps	Goals	Apps	Goals
Tampines Rovers	2019	Singapore Premier League	11	1	6 (Note: Appearances in the Singapore Cup)	1	0	0	0	0	17	2
Tampines Rovers	2020	Singapore Premier League	3	0	0	0	0	0	1	0	4	0
Tampines Rovers	2021	Singapore Premier League	0	0	0	0	0	0	0	0	0	0
Tampines Rovers	Total		14	1	6	1	0	0	1	0	21	2
Young Lions (loan)	2021	Singapore Premier League	19	1	0	0	0	0	0	0	19	1
Young Lions (loan)	2022	Singapore Premier League	21	0	0	0	0	0	0	0	21	0
Young Lions (loan)	Total		40	1	0	0	0	0	0	0	40	1
Tampines Rovers	2022	Singapore Premier League	3	1	6	1	0	0	0	0	9	2
Tampines Rovers	2023	Singapore Premier League	24	0	6	2	0	0	1	0	31	2
Tampines Rovers	2024–25	Singapore Premier League	7	1	0	0	0	0	3	0	10	1
Tampines Rovers	Total		34	2	12	3	0	0	4	0	50	5
Career total			88	4	18	4	0	0	5	0	111	8

=== International ===
==== International caps ====
No	Date	Venue	Opponent	Result	Competition
1	23 March 2023	Mong Kok Stadium, Hong Kong	Hong Kong	1–1	Friendly
2	26 March 2023	Macau Olympic Complex Stadium, Macau	Macau	1–0	Friendly
3	18 June 2023	Jalan Besar Stadium, Singapore	Solomon Islands	1-1 (draw)	Friendly
4	12 September 2023	Bishan Stadium, Singapore	Chinese Taipei	3-1 (win)	Friendly

==== U23 International caps ====
No	Date	Venue	Opponent	Result	Competition
1	25 October 2021	Jalan Besar Stadium, Jalan Besar, Singapore	Timor-Leste	2-2 (draw)	2022 AFC U-23 Asian Cup qualification
2	28 October 2021	Jalan Besar Stadium, Jalan Besar, Singapore	Philippines	1-0 (won)	2022 AFC U-23 Asian Cup qualification
3	31 October 2021	Jalan Besar Stadium, Jalan Besar, Singapore	South Korea	1-5 (lost)	2022 AFC U-23 Asian Cup qualification
4	7 May 2022	Thiên Trường Stadium, Nam Định, Vietnam	Laos	2–2 (draw)	2021 Southeast Asian Games
5	9 May 2022	Thiên Trường Stadium, Nam Định, Vietnam	Thailand	0–5 (lost)	2021 Southeast Asian Games
6	14 May 2022	Thiên Trường Stadium, Nam Định, Vietnam	Malaysia	2–2 (draw)	2021 Southeast Asian Games

==== U19 International caps ====
No	Date	Venue	Opponent	Result	Competition
1	1 July 2018	Gelora Joko Samudro Stadium, Gresik, Indonesia	Philippines	1-2 (lost)	2018 AFF U-18 Youth Championship
2	3 July 2018	Gelora Joko Samudro Stadium, Gresik, Indonesia	Indonesia	0-4 (lost)	2018 AFF U-18 Youth Championship
3	5 July 2018	Gelora Joko Samudro Stadium, Gresik, Indonesia	Thailand	0-6 (lost)	2018 AFF U-18 Youth Championship
4	7 July 2018	Gelora Joko Samudro Stadium, Gresik, Indonesia	Laos	0-5 (lost)	2018 AFF U-18 Youth Championship
5	9 July 2018	Gelora Joko Samudro Stadium, Gresik, Indonesia	Vietnam	2-2 (draw)	2018 AFF U-18 Youth Championship

==== U16 International caps ====
No	Date	Venue	Opponent	Result	Competition
1	30 July 2015	Phnom Penh Olympic Stadium, Phnom Penh, Cambodia	Philippines	4-1 (won)	2015 AFF U-16 Youth Championship
2	3 August 2015	Phnom Penh Olympic Stadium, Phnom Penh, Cambodia	Cambodia	0-0 (draw)	2015 AFF U-16 Youth Championship
3	2 September 2015	Jalan Besar Stadium, Kallang, Singapore	Thailand	0-5 (lost)	2016 AFC U-16 Championship qualification
4	4 September 2015	Jalan Besar Stadium, Kallang, Singapore	North Korea	0-3 (lost)	2016 AFC U-16 Championship qualification
5	6 September 2015	Jalan Besar Stadium, Kallang, Singapore	Cambodia	3-1 (won)	2016 AFC U-16 Championship qualification
6	10 July 2016	Phnom Penh Olympic Stadium, Phnom Penh, Cambodia	Philippines	3-1 (win)	2016 AFF U-16 Youth Championship
7	12 July 2016	Phnom Penh Olympic Stadium, Phnom Penh, Cambodia	Myanmar	1-4 (lost)	2016 AFF U-16 Youth Championship
8	14 July 2016	Phnom Penh Olympic Stadium, Phnom Penh, Cambodia	Malaysia	0-2 (lost)	2016 AFF U-16 Youth Championship
9	16 July 2016	Phnom Penh Olympic Stadium, Phnom Penh, Cambodia	Australia	2-6 (lost)	2016 AFF U-16 Youth Championship
10	18 July 2016	Phnom Penh Olympic Stadium, Phnom Penh, Cambodia	Vietnam	0-3 (lost)	2016 AFF U-16 Youth Championship

==== U16 International goals ====
Scores and results list Singapore's goal tally first.

No.	Date	Venue	Opponent	Score	Result	Competition
1.	10 July 2016	Phnom Penh Olympic Stadium, Phnom Penh, Cambodia	Philippines	3–0	3-1	2016 AFF U-16 Youth Championship

== Honours ==
Tampines Rovers

- Singapore Cup: 2019
- Singapore Community Shield: 2020, 2025
