= Yadegar-e Emam Stadium (Tabriz) =

Multi-purpose stadium in Tabriz, Iran

Sahand Stadium
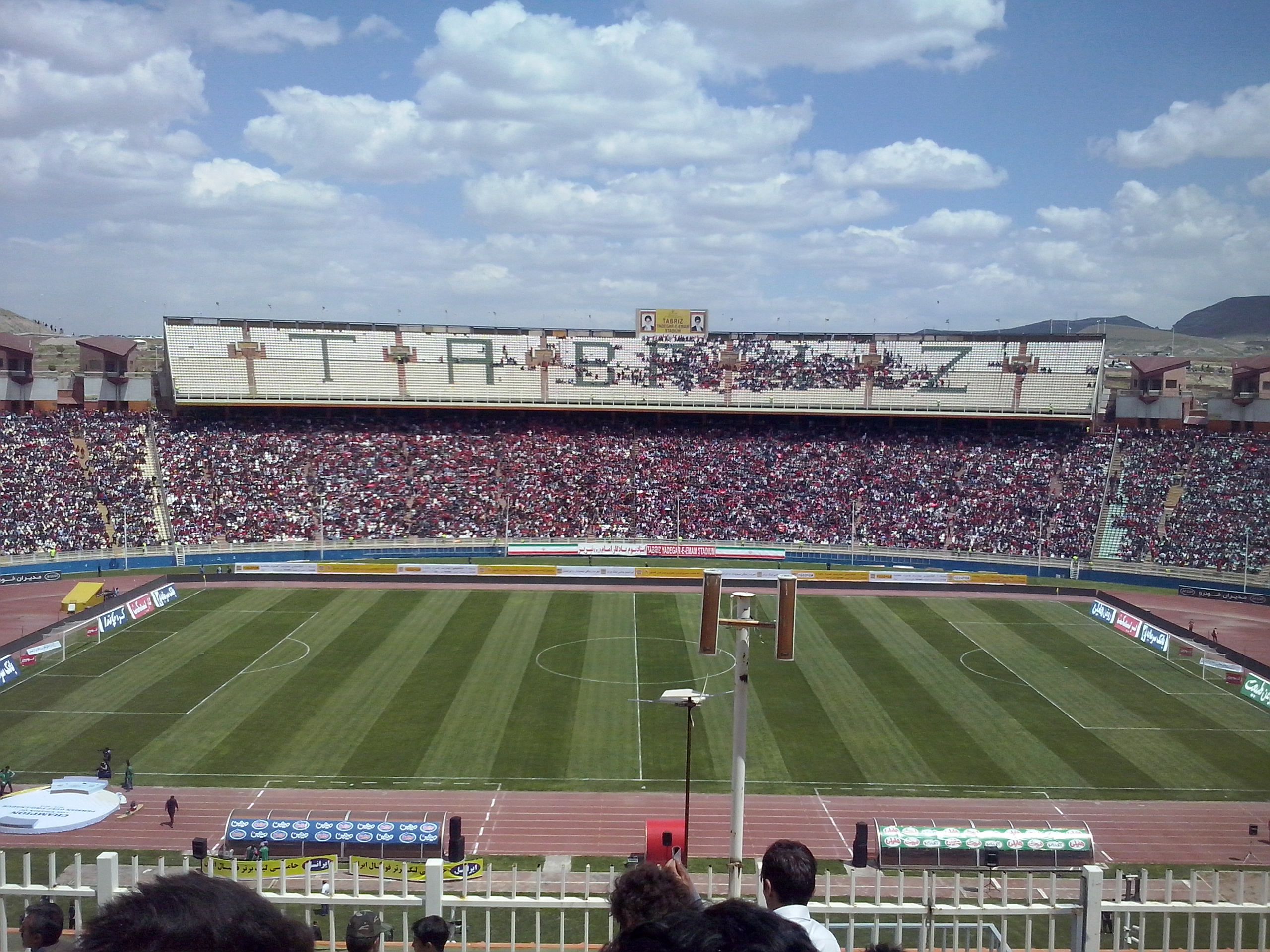
- Sahand Stadium in a matchday
- Interactive map of Sahand Stadium
- Full name: Sahand Stadium
- Location: Tabriz, Iran
- Owner: Ministry of Sport and Youth (Iran)
- Capacity: 66,833
- Surface: Desso GrassMaster
- Field size: 105 m × 68 m (344 ft × 223 ft)

Construction
- Opened: 5 May 1996
- Renovated: 2010
- Cost: 6 Billion Tomans (€2,401,249)

Tenant
- Tractor (1996–present)

Sahand Stadium (Fārsi: Estādiome Sāhānd), also popularly known as Tabriz Sahand Stadium is a multi-purpose stadium in Tabriz, Iran. It is currently used mostly for football matches. The stadium was built in 1996 and can accommodate 66,833 spectators. Tractor, the Iran Premiere League side, plays their home games at the stadium. Sahand Tabriz Stadium is part of the Tabriz Olympic Village.

== History ==
=== Built ===
Yadegar-e-Imam Stadium was built in 1989 and was opened on 19 January 1996. Tractor played their home matches from 1979 until 1996 in the 25,000-capacity Bagh Shomal Stadium (Takhti Stadium), 1976 AFC Asian Cup stadium. Sahand Stadium (Yadegar-e Emam Stadium) was replaced by Bagh-e Shomal Stadium after it was completed in January 1996. The stadium is also part of Tabriz Olympic Complex.

=== Renovation ===
In December 2006, 5,000 new seats were installed in the stadium and a large jumbotron scoreboard added, along with general repairs costing 350 million rials (about 117,000 USD). The renovation ended in October 2010.

== International Matches ==
Iran National Football Team Matches

Date	Team #1	Res.	Team #2	Round
21 April 1997	Iran	3–0	Kenya	Friendly

2016 AFC U-16 Championship qualification

Date	Team #1	Res.	Team #2	Round
16 September 2015	Bahrain	0–5	India	2016 AFC U-16 Championship qualification
16 September 2015	Iran	3–1	Lebanon	2016 AFC U-16 Championship qualification
18 September 2015	Bahrain	2–1	Lebanon	2016 AFC U-16 Championship qualification
20 September 2015	India	6–0	Lebanon	2016 AFC U-16 Championship qualification
