= Yancheng Luzhiying F.C. =

Chinese football club

Yancheng Luzhiying Yánchéng Lùzhīyíng 盐城鹿之瀛
- Full name: Yancheng Luzhiying Football Club 盐城鹿之瀛足球俱乐部
- Founded: 2016; 9 years ago
- Dissolved: 2021; 4 years ago
- Ground: Dafeng Olympic Sports Centre, Yancheng
- Capacity: 10,000
- 2020: League Two, 19th of 20
Home colours	Away colours

Yancheng Luzhiying Football Club was an association football club from Yancheng, Jiangsu that most recently played in China League Two. The club was dissolved in 2021.

== History ==
Jiangsu Yancheng Dingli F.C. was established in January 2016. The club decided to buy the first team of Fujian Broncos F.C. as well as their position in Chinese Football Association China League Two.

At the start of the 2021 China League Two season, the club changed its name to Yancheng Luzhiying.

== Name history ==
- 2016–2020 Jiangsu Yancheng Dingli F.C. 江苏盐城鼎立
- 2021– Yancheng Luzhiying F.C. 盐城鹿之瀛

== Current squad ==
=== First team ===
As of 24 October 2020

Note: Flags indicate national team as defined under FIFA eligibility rules; some limited exceptions apply. Players may hold more than one non-FIFA nationality.

No.	Pos.	Nation	Player
1	GK	CHN	Zhang Jin
3	DF	CHN	Zhao Xiang
4	DF	CHN	Fang Wensheng
5	DF	CHN	Tang Libo
7	FW	CHN	Wang Fei
9	MF	CHN	Ma Jun
10	MF	CHN	Wu Qingsong
12	DF	CHN	Ma Chao
13	DF	CHN	Duan Yu
15	DF	CHN	Hong Youpeng
16	MF	CHN	He Fei
18	DF	CHN	Li Minhui
19	MF	CHN	Li Chao
21	DF	CHN	Rao Bin

No.	Pos.	Nation	Player
28	DF	CHN	Chen Hongzhen
29	DF	CHN	Pang Lei
30	GK	CHN	Su Mengqi
40	DF	CHN	Bai Yaowei
50	GK	CHN	Tong Tianran
51	FW	CHN	Örgön
52	MF	CHN	Zhang Shengchong
53	DF	CHN	Chen Xiaowen
54	MF	CHN	Chen Kanglin
55	MF	CHN	Bu Wenhao
56	DF	CHN	Wang Pengbo
57	FW	CHN	Wu Zewei
58	DF	CHN	Chen Guanjian

=== Reserve squad ===
Note: Flags indicate national team as defined under FIFA eligibility rules; some limited exceptions apply. Players may hold more than one non-FIFA nationality.

No.	Pos.	Nation	Player
—	DF	CHN	Wang Meng
—	MF	CHN	Xu Zheming
—	FW	CHN	Cui Xudong
—	GK	CHN	Zhai Kaimin

No.	Pos.	Nation	Player
—	MF	CHN	Zhang Xu
—	MF	CHN	Huang Zhenhua
—	DF	CHN	Wang Wei

== Coaching staff ==
Position	Staff
Head coach	(China) Fan Wenlong
Assistant coach	

Source: CFA

== Managerial history ==
- (China) Gao Fei (2016–2017)
- (China) Wang Hongwei (2017–2018)
- (China) Huang Yong (2019–2020)
- (China) Tang Jing (2020)
- (China) Fan Wenlong (2021)

== Results ==
All-time league rankings

As of the end of 2019 season.

Year	Div	Pld	W	D	L	GF	GA	GD	Pts	Pos.	FA Cup	Super Cup	AFC	Att./G	Stadium
2016	3	20	2	7	11	16	34	−18	13	18	R1	DNQ	DNQ	731	Dafeng Olympic Sports Centre Stadium
2017	3	24	7	7	10	24	33	−9	28	13	R2	DNQ	DNQ	519	Dafeng Olympic Sports Centre Stadium
2018	3	31	16	9	6	46	23	23	57	4	R2	DNQ	DNQ	439	Dafeng Olympic Sports Centre Stadium
2019	3	30	8	9	13	33	37	−4	33^{1}	15	R1	DNQ	DNQ		Dafeng Olympic Sports Centre Stadium

- ^1 In group stage.

Key

	China top division
	China second division
	China third division
W	Winners
RU	Runners-up
3	Third place
	Relegated

- Pld = Played
- W = Games won
- D = Games drawn
- L = Games lost
- F = Goals for
- A = Goals against
- Pts = Points
- Pos = Final position
- DNQ = Did not qualify
- DNE = Did not enter
- NH = Not Held
- – = Does Not Exist
- R1 = Round 1
- R2 = Round 2
- R3 = Round 3
- R4 = Round 4
- F = Final
- SF = Semi-finals
- QF = Quarter-finals
- R16 = Round of 16
- Group = Group stage
- GS2 = Second Group stage
- QR1 = First Qualifying Round
- QR2 = Second Qualifying Round
- QR3 = Third Qualifying Round
