= Jacob Italiano =

Australian soccer player (born 2001)

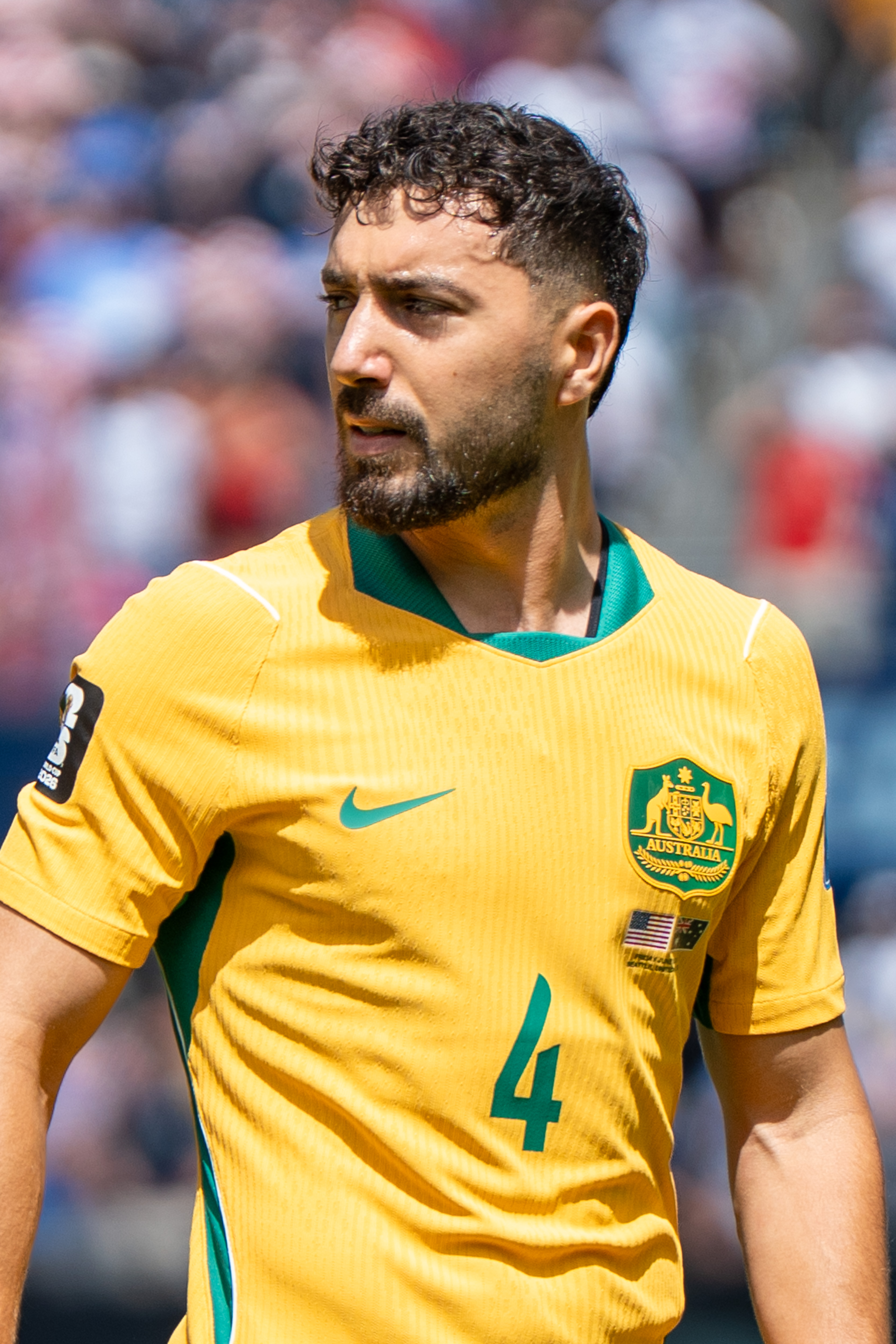
- Italiano with Australia in 2026

Personal information
- Full name: Jacob Michael Italiano
- Date of birth: 30 July 2001 (age 25)
- Place of birth: Perth, Australia
- Height: 1.78 m (5 ft 10 in)
- Position: Right back

Team information
- Current team: Grazer AK
- Number: 14

Youth career
- Inglewood United
- 2014–2015: FW NTC

Senior career*
Years	Team	Apps	(Gls)
2016–2017	FFA CoE	29	(9)
2017–2019	Perth Glory NPL	2	(0)
2017–2019	Perth Glory	18	(0)
2019–2024	Borussia Mönchengladbach II	103	(9)
2024–	Grazer AK	52	(5)

International career^{‡}
2016	Australia U17	13	(4)
2017–2021	Australia U20	2	(0)
2019–2024	Australia U23	13	(2)
2025–	Australia	7	(0)
Medal record
Men's football
Representing Australia
AFC U-23 Asian Cup
Third place	2020	U-23 Team
WAFF U-23 Championship
Runner-up	2024
AFF U-16 Youth Championship
First place	2016	U-17 Team
Third place	2015	U-17 Team
- * Club domestic league appearances and goals as of 10 June 2026 ‡ National team caps and goals as of 19 June 2026

Jacob Michael Italiano (born 30 July 2001) is an Australian professional football player who plays as a right back for Austrian Bundesliga club Grazer AK and the Australia national team.

He has previously played for Australian club Perth Glory and German club Borussia Mönchengladbach II.

== Early life ==
Italiano was born in Perth, Australia.

== Club career ==
=== Perth Glory ===
Italiano played for Perth Glory from 2017 to 2019.

=== Borussia Mönchengladbach ===
In May 2019, Italiano moved to German club Borussia Mönchengladbach. He played for the reserves side and often trained with the senior team.

=== Grazer AK ===
In June 2024, Italiano joined newly promoted Austrian club Grazer AK on a three-year contract.

== International career ==
Italiano is dual-citizen of Australia and Italy. He was called up to the Australian national team for a set of friendlies in October 2025, making his debut against Canada.

On 31 May 2026, Italiano was selected in the 26-man squad for the 2026 FIFA World Cup. He featured in both the Turkey and United States group-stage matches before sustaining a groin injury during training ahead of the third match against Paraguay, which forced him to miss the rest of the tournament.

== Honours ==
Perth Glory

- A-League: Premiers 2018–19

Australia U23

- AFC U-23 Championship 3rd place: 2020
- WAFF U-23 Championship: runner-up 2024

Australia U17

- AFF U-16 Youth Championship: 2016
