= Chen Quanjiang =

Chinese association football player

Personal information
- Date of birth: 10 July 2001 (age 25)
- Place of birth: Dazhou, Sichuan, China
- Height: 1.75 m (5 ft 9 in)
- Position: Defender

Team information
- Current team: Changchun Xidu
- Number: 44

Youth career
- –2020: Guangzhou Evergrande

Senior career*
Years	Team	Apps	(Gls)
2020–2024	Guangzhou FC	16	(0)
2020	→ Inner Mongolia Zhongyou (loan)	7	(0)
2025	Guangxi Pingguo	24	(0)
2026	Meizhou Hakka	3	(0)
2026–	Changchun Xidu	0	(0)
- * Club domestic league appearances and goals as of 00:37, 9 March 2026 (UTC)

Chen Quanjiang (simplified Chinese: 陈泉江; traditional Chinese: 陳泉江; pinyin: Chén Quánjiāng; born 10 July 2000) is a Chinese footballer currently playing as a defender for China League Two club Changchun Xidu.

On 4 July 2026, Chen transferred to China League Two club Changchun Xidu.

== Career statistics ==
=== Club ===
As of 9 March 2026.

Club	Season	League			Cup		Continental		Other		Total	
Club	Season	Division	Apps	Goals	Apps	Goals	Apps	Goals	Apps	Goals	Apps	Goals
Guangzhou FC	2021	Chinese Super League	0	0	1	0	3 (Note: Appearances in the AFC Champions League)	0	–		4	0
Guangzhou FC	2022	Chinese Super League	8	0	2	0	0	0	–		10	0
Guangzhou FC	2023	China League One	7	0	1	0	–		–		8	0
Guangzhou FC	2024	China League One	1	0	0	0	–		–		1	0
Guangzhou FC	Total		16	0	4	0	3	0	0	0	23	0
Inner Mongolia Zhongyou (loan)	2020	China League One	7	0	–		–		0	0	7	0
Guangxi Pingguo	2025	China League One	24	0	1	0	–		0	0	25	0
Career total			47	0	5	0	3	0	0	0	55	0
