= Chen Rong (footballer) =

Chinese association football player

Personal information
- Date of birth: 26 January 2001 (age 25)
- Place of birth: Lu'an, Anhui, China
- Height: 1.70 m (5 ft 7 in)
- Position: Midfielder

Team information
- Current team: Suzhou Dongwu
- Number: 20

Youth career
- 2013–2020: Atlético Madrid
- 2020–2021: Dalian Pro

Senior career*
Years	Team	Apps	(Gls)
2021–2023	Dalian Pro	2	(0)
2021	→ China U20 (loan)	12	(1)
2022	→ Liaoning Shenyang Urban (loan)	14	(1)
2024	Ganzhou Ruishi	13	(2)
2024–2025	Dalian K'un City	40	(2)
2026–	Suzhou Dongwu	0	(0)

International career^{‡}
2019	China U18	2	(0)
2022-2023	China U22	3	(0)
- * Club domestic league appearances and goals as of 00:01, 28 April 2022 (UTC) ‡ National team caps and goals as of 00:01, 25 December 2021 (UTC)

Chen Rong (Chinese: 陈荣; born 26 January 2001) is a Chinese footballer currently playing as a midfielder for Suzhou Dongwu.

== Club career ==
Born in Lu'an, Anhui, Chen moved to Spain in 2013 as part of the Wanda Group's Rising Stars programme. In 2019, he joined the youth academy of Atlético Madrid.

On his return to China, Chen signed with Dalian Pro, before going out on loan to the youth development programme, China's under-20 team competing in the China League Two. He scored on his debut in the Chinese FA Cup.

On 28 February 2026, Chen signed with China League One club Suzhou Dongwu.

== Career statistics ==
=== Club ===
As of 25 December 2021.

Club	Season	League			Cup		Other		Total	
Club	Season	Division	Apps	Goals	Apps	Goals	Apps	Goals	Apps	Goals
Dalian Pro	2021	Chinese Super League	0	0	0	0	0	0	0	0
China U20 (loan)	2021	China League Two	12	1	2 (Note: Appearances in the Chinese FA Cup)	1	0	0	14	2
Career total			12	1	2	1	0	0	14	2
