= Mohammad Reza Ghobeishavi =

Iranian association football player

Mohammad Reza Ghobishavi
Personal information
- Date of birth: 24 January 2000 (age 26)
- Place of birth: Abadan, Iran
- Height: 1.77 m (5 ft 10 in)
- Position: Midfielder

Team information
- Current team: Sanat Naft Abadan
- Number: 14

Youth career
- –2017: Sanat Naft Abadan

Senior career*
| Years | Team | Apps | (Gls) |
| 2017–2022 | Sanat Naft | 73 | (6) |
| 2022–2024 | Foolad | 35 | (1) |
| 2024–2025 | Paykan | 24 | (0) |
| 2025– | Sanat Naft | 15 | (0) |

International career^{‡}
| 2016 | Iran U16 | 8 | (2) |
| 2017 | Iran U17 | 11 | (2) |
| 2023 | Iran U23 | 3 | (0) |
- * Club domestic league appearances and goals as of 16 April 2025 ‡ National team caps and goals as of 1 October 2023

Mohammad Reza Ghobishavi (Persian: محمدرضا غبیشاوی; born 24 January 2000) is an Iranian footballer who plays as a midfielder for Sanat Naft in the Persian Gulf Pro League.

== Club career ==
=== Sanat Naft ===
He made his debut for Sanat Naft Abadan in 25th fixtures of 2017–18 Iran Pro League against Siah Jamegan.

== Career statistics ==
=== Club ===
| Club | Season | League | | | Cup | | Continental | | Total | |
| Club | Season | League | Apps | Goals | Apps | Goals | Apps | Goals | Apps | Goals |
|---|---|---|---|---|---|---|---|---|---|---|
| Sanat | 2017-18 | Persian Gulf Pro League | 2 | 0 | 0 | 0 | 0 | 0 | 2 | 0 |
| Sanat | 2018-19 | Persian Gulf Pro League | 12 | 3 | 1 | 0 | 0 | 0 | 13 | 3 |
| Sanat | 2019-20 | Persian Gulf Pro League | 12 | 1 | 0 | 0 | 0 | 0 | 12 | 1 |
| Sanat | 2020-21 | Persian Gulf Pro League | 23 | 0 | 2 | 0 | 0 | 0 | 25 | 0 |
| Sanat | 2021-22 | Persian Gulf Pro League | 24 | 2 | 1 | 1 | 0 | 0 | 25 | 3 |
| Sanat | Total | | 73 | 6 | 4 | 1 | 0 | 0 | 77 | 7 |
| Foolad | 2022-23 | Persian Gulf Pro League | 16 | 0 | 2 | 0 | 0 | 0 | 18 | 0 |
| Foolad | 2023-24 | Persian Gulf Pro League | 11 | 0 | 1 | 0 | 0 | 0 | 12 | 0 |
| Foolad | Total | | 27 | 0 | 3 | 0 | 0 | 0 | 30 | 0 |
| Career Total | | | 100 | 6 | 7 | 1 | 0 | 0 | 107 | 7 |

== Honours ==
=== International ===
Iran U16

- AFC U-16 Championship runner-up: 2016
