= Shin Sang-whi =

South Korean footballer

Shin Sang-hwi
Personal information
- Full name: Shin Sang-hwi
- Date of birth: 14 July 2000 (age 26)
- Place of birth: South Korea
- Height: 1.76 m (5 ft 9 in)
- Position: Midfielder

Team information
- Current team: Chuncheon FC
- Number: 47

Youth career
- 2016–2019: Maetan High School

Senior career*
Years	Team	Apps	(Gls)
2019–2020	Suwon Samsung Bluewings	1	(0)
2021–	Gimhae FC	0	(0)

International career^{‡}
2015–2016	South Korea U-17	12	(7)
- * Club domestic league appearances and goals as of 7 April 2019 ‡ National team caps and goals as of 7 April 2019

- Shin Sang-whi
- Hangul: 신상휘
- RR: Sin Sanghwi
- MR: Sin Sanghwi

Shin Sang-hwi (Korean: 신상휘; born 14 July 2000) is a South Korean football midfielder who plays for Gimhae FC.
