= Emir Shigaybayev =

Kyrgyzstani footballer

Personal information
- Full name: Emir Edilbekovich Shigaybayev
- Date of birth: 12 August 2001 (age 25)
- Place of birth: Bishkek, Kyrgyzstan
- Height: 1.75 m (5 ft 9 in)
- Position: Midfielder

Youth career
- 2017–2019: Antalyaspor

Senior career*
Years	Team	Apps	(Gls)
2019	Kara-Balta		
2020–2021	Neman Grodno	1	(0)
2021	→ Neftchi Kochkor-Ata (loan)	10	(1)
2022	Rubin Yalta	9	(0)
2022	FC Talant	12	(0)
2023–2024	Alga Bishkek	13	(0)

International career
2015–2016	Kyrgyzstan U16	6	(2)
2018–2019	Kyrgyzstan U19	4	(1)
- * Club domestic league appearances and goals as of 31 December 2024

Emir Edilbekovich Shigaybayev (Kyrgyz: Эмир Шыгайбаев; Russian: Эмир Эдильбекович Шигайбаев; born 12 August 2001) is a Kyrgyzstani professional footballer.
