= Nguyễn Trần Việt Cường =

Vietnamese footballer (born 2000)

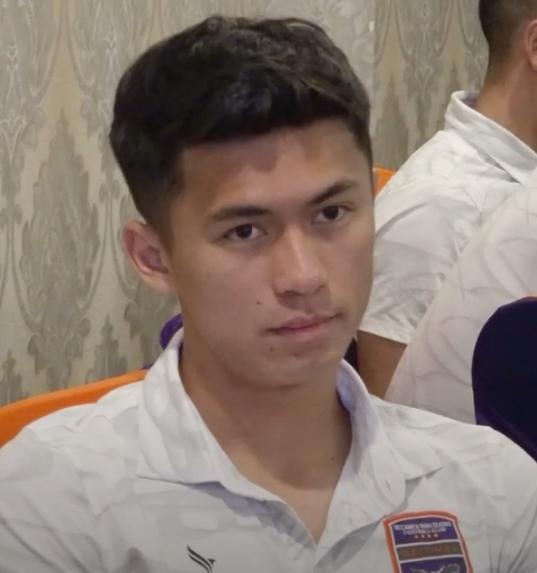
- Việt Cường in 2023

Personal information
- Full name: Nguyễn Trần Việt Cường
- Date of birth: 27 December 2000 (age 25)
- Place of birth: Tân Uyên, Bình Dương, Vietnam
- Height: 1.80 m (5 ft 11 in)
- Positions: Winger; striker

Team information
- Current team: Becamex Hồ Chí Minh City
- Number: 7

Youth career
- 2012–2019: Becamex Bình Dương

Senior career*
Years	Team	Apps	(Gls)
2017–	Becamex Hồ Chí Minh City	111	(19)

International career^{‡}
2016	Vietnam U16	8	(3)
2021–2022	Vietnam U23	6	(0)
2026–	Vietnam	7	(0)
- * Club domestic league appearances and goals as of 21 November 2026 ‡ National team caps and goals as of 17 November 2026

Nguyễn Trần Việt Cường (born 27 December 2000) is a Vietnamese professional footballer who plays as a winger or striker for V.League 2 club Becamex Hồ Chí Minh City and the Vietnam national team.

== Club career ==
Born in Bình Dương, Việt Cường was a youth product of Becamex Bình Dương. In 2017, he was promoted to the first team of Becamex Bình Dương. On 6 October 2017, Việt Cường made his professional debut in his team's 2–1 win against SHB Đà Nẵng as part of the Vietnamese Cup semi finals. This made him the first player born in the 21st century to appear in a professional match in Vietnam.

On 24 August 2019, Việt Cường scored his first career goal, in Becamex Bình Dương's 1–0 V.League 1 win against Than Quảng Ninh.

== International career ==
Việt Cương took part in the AFF U-16 Youth Championship with Vietnam U16 and scored 2 goals as his team finished as runner-up. He later participated in the 2016 AFC U-16 Championship.

== Career statistics ==
=== Club ===
As of match played 21 November 2026

Appearances and goals by club, season and competition
Club	Season	League			Cup		Other		Total	
Club	Season	Division	Apps	Goals	Apps	Goals	Apps	Goals	Apps	Goals
Becamex Hồ Chí Minh City
Becamex Hồ Chí Minh City	2017	V.League 1	1	0	1	0	—		2	0
Becamex Hồ Chí Minh City	2018	V.League 1	0	0	1	0	—		1	0
Becamex Hồ Chí Minh City	2019	V.League 1	3	1	1	0	1 (Note: Appearance in AFC Cup)	0	5	1
Becamex Hồ Chí Minh City	2020	V.League 1	8	1	0	0	—		8	1
Becamex Hồ Chí Minh City	2021	V.League 1	10	0	1	0	—		11	0
Becamex Hồ Chí Minh City	2022	V.League 1	9	2	0	0	—		9	2
Becamex Hồ Chí Minh City	2023	V.League 1	14	1	2	2	—		16	3
Becamex Hồ Chí Minh City	2023-24	V.League 1	22	1	3	1	—		25	2
Becamex Hồ Chí Minh City	2024-25	V.League 1	15	2	3	0	—		18	2
Becamex Hồ Chí Minh City	2025-26	V.League 1	21	7	0	0	—		21	7
Becamex Hồ Chí Minh City	2026-27	V.League 2	8	4	1	1	—		9	5
Total career			111	19	13	4	1	0	125	23

=== International ===
As of match played 17 November 2026

Appearances and goals by national team and year
National team	Year	Apps	Goals
Vietnam	2026	7	0
Total		7	0

== Honours ==
Becamex Hồ Chí Minh City

- Vietnamese National Cup: 2018

Vietnam

- ASEAN Championship: 2026
