= Sun Qinhan =

Chinese association football player

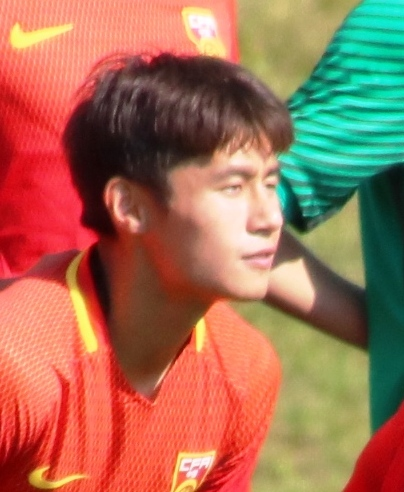
- Sun Qinhan in 2018

Personal information
- Date of birth: 21 March 2000 (age 26)
- Place of birth: Hefei, Anhui, China
- Height: 1.79 m (5 ft 10 in)
- Positions: Right-back; midfielder

Team information
- Current team: Shenzhen Juniors
- Number: 13

Youth career
- –2018: Genbao Football Base
- 2018–2020: Shanghai Shenhua

Senior career*
Years	Team	Apps	(Gls)
2020–2022	Shanghai Shenhua	1	(0)
2020	→ Beijing BSU (loan)	10	(0)
2021	→ Changchun Yatai (loan)	5	(0)
2022	→ Heilongjiang Ice City (loan)	16	(1)
2023–2024	Cangzhou Mighty Lions	39	(0)
2025	Changchun Yatai	5	(0)
2026–	Shenzhen Juniors	0	(0)

International career
2018	China U-19	9	(0)
2019–2023	China U-23	8	(1)
- * Club domestic league appearances and goals as of 28 August 2025

Sun Qinhan (Chinese: 孙沁涵; born 21 March 2000) is a Chinese footballer currently playing as a right-back or midfielder for Shenzhen Juniors.

== Club career ==
Sun Qinhan would play for the Genbao Football Base who represented Shanghai within the football at the 2017 National Games of China where they won gold against Sichuan in a 2-1 victory. The following year he would go on to join the Shanghai Shenhua youth team. On 18 July 2020 he would be loaned out to second tier club Beijing BSU. He would go on to make his professional debut in a league game on 13 September 2020 against Inner Mongolia Zhongyou in a 1-0 victory.

On 11 April 2021, Sun would go on loan to top tier club Changchun Yatai for the start of the 2021 Chinese Super League campaign. He would make his debut in a league game on 28 July 2021 against Tianjin Jinmen Tiger in a 4-1 victory. After playing a handful of games he would return to Shenhua, where in the following season he would make his debut for his parent club in a league game on 7 July 2022 against Hebei in a 1-0 victory. On 31 August 2022, Sun would join second tier club Heilongjiang Ice City for the remainder of the 2022 China League One campaign. He made his debut in a league game on 3 September 2022 against Qingdao Youth Island in a 1-0 defeat. This would be followed by his first goal in a league game on 3 December 2022 against Nantong Zhiyun in a 2-0 victory.

On 4 April 2023, Sun would join top tier club Cangzhou Mighty Lions for the start of the 2023 Chinese Super League campaign.

== Career statistics ==
As of 31 December 2024.

Club	Season	League			Cup		Continental		Other		Total	
Club	Season	Division	Apps	Goals	Apps	Goals	Apps	Goals	Apps	Goals	Apps	Goals
Shanghai Shenhua	2020	Chinese Super League	0	0	0	0	0	0	–		0	0
Shanghai Shenhua	2022	Chinese Super League	1	0	0	0	–		–		1	0
Shanghai Shenhua	Total		1	0	0	0	0	0	0	0	1	0
Beijing BSU (loan)	2020	China League One	10	0	–		–		–		10	0
Changchun Yatai (loan)	2021	Chinese Super League	5	0	0	0	–		–		5	0
Heilongjiang Ice City (loan)	2022	China League One	16	1	0	0	–		–		10	0
Cangzhou Mighty Lions	2023	Chinese Super League	25	0	0	0	–		–		25	0
Cangzhou Mighty Lions	2024	Chinese Super League	14	0	1	0	–		–		15	0
Cangzhou Mighty Lions	Total		39	0	1	0	0	0	0	0	40	0
Career total			71	1	1	0	0	0	0	0	72	1
