= Wu Zewei =

Chinese association football player

Personal information
- Date of birth: 24 March 2000 (age 26)
- Place of birth: Shenzhen, China
- Height: 1.83 m (6 ft 0 in)
- Position: Midfielder

Youth career
- Valencia
- Villarreal
- Atlético Madrid
- –2018: Alcorcón

Senior career*
Years	Team	Apps	(Gls)
2018–2019	Alcorcón C	1	(0)
2019–2020	Flat Earth	1	(0)
2020–2021	Jiangsu Yancheng Dingli	9	(0)

International career
2015	China U16		
2018	China U19		
- * Club domestic league appearances and goals as of 14:01, 25 July 2021 (UTC)

Wu Zewei (Chinese: 吴泽玮; born 24 March 2000), known in Spain as Iván, is a Chinese footballer.

== Club career ==
Having trained in Spain with a number of professional clubs, Wu returned to China and played 11 games in 2020 for Jiangsu Yancheng Dingli.

== Career statistics ==
=== Club ===
As of 25 July 2021.

Club	Season	League			Cup		Continental		Other		Total	
Club	Season	Division	Apps	Goals	Apps	Goals	Apps	Goals	Apps	Goals	Apps	Goals
Alcorcón C	2018–19	Tercera Aficionados Madrid	1	0	0	0	–		0	0	1	0
Flat Earth	2019–20	Tercera División	1	0	0	0	–		0	0	1	0
Jiangsu Yancheng Dingli	2020	China League Two	9	0	0	0	–		2 (Note: Appearances in the China League Two playoffs)	0	11	0
Career total			11	0	0	0	0	0	2	0	13	0
