= Bryce Bafford =

Australian soccer player (born 2001)

Personal information
- Full name: Bryce Bafford
- Date of birth: 5 June 2001 (age 25)
- Place of birth: Australia
- Position: Midfielder

Team information
- Current team: Perth RedStar

Youth career
- FW NTC

Senior career*
Years	Team	Apps	(Gls)
2016–2017	FFA CoE	23	(8)
2017–2019	Brisbane Roar NPL	33	(10)
2019–2021	Perth Glory NPL	30	(12)
2020–2021	Perth Glory	3	(0)
2022–	Perth RedStar	2	(1)
Medal record
Men's football
Representing Australia
AFF U-16 Youth Championship
First place	2016 Cambodia	U-17 Team
- * Club domestic league appearances and goals as of 2 June 2022 ‡ National team caps and goals as of 24 January 2021

Bryce Bafford (born 5 June 2001), is an Australian professional footballer who plays as a midfielder for Perth RedStar.

== Club career ==
=== Brisbane Roar ===
Bafford was part of the 2018-19 Y-League championship winning Brisbane Roar Youth team. He was substituted on for Zach Duncan in the 62nd minute as the Young Roar beat Western Sydney Wanderers Youth 3–1 in the 2019 Y-League Grand Final on 1 February 2019.

=== Perth Glory ===
On 18 November 2020, Bafford made his professional debut in a 2020 AFC Champions League clash against Shanghai Greenland Shenhua, starting before being replaced by Carlo Armiento in the 63rd minute as Glory went down 2–1.

== Honours ==
=== Club ===
Brisbane Roar

- Y-League: 2018–19

=== International ===
Australia U17

- AFF U-16 Youth Championship: 2016
