= Nguyễn Trọng Long =

Vietnamese footballer

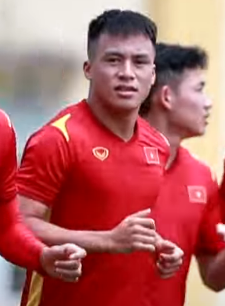
- Trọng Long in 2022

Personal information
- Full name: Nguyễn Trọng Long
- Date of birth: 6 January 2000 (age 26)
- Place of birth: Bá Thước, Thanh Hóa, Vietnam
- Height: 1.70 m (5 ft 7 in)
- Position: Midfielder

Team information
- Current team: Ninh Bình
- Number: 29

Youth career
- 2013–2018: PVF Academy

Senior career*
Years	Team	Apps	(Gls)
2019–2020	Phố Hiến	19	(0)
2021–2022	Hồ Chí Minh City	24	(0)
2023–2025	Công An Hà Nội	15	(1)
2025–	Ninh Bình	30	(0)

International career
2016–2017	Vietnam U15	4	(0)
2017–2018	Vietnam U18	5	(0)
2019–2020	Vietnam U20	6	(0)
2021–2022	Vietnam U23	10	(0)
Medal record
Men's football
Representing Vietnam
SEA Games
Gold medal – first place	Hanoi 2021	Team
- * Club domestic league appearances and goals as of 7 June 2026

Nguyễn Trọng Long (born 6 January 2000) is a Vietnamese professional footballer who plays as a midfielder for V.League 1 club Ninh Bình.

== Club career ==
In the 2023 V.League 1 season, Trọng Long was part of the Công An Hà Nội team that win the league title, contributing a goal after 10 appearances.

== Honours ==
Công An Hà Nội

- V.League 1: 2023

Phù Đổng Ninh Bình

- V.League 2: 2024–25

Vietnam U23

- SEA Games Gold medal: 2021

Individual

- V.League 1 Goal of the Month: April 2023
