= Peerapat Kaminthong =

Thai footballer

Personal information
- Full name: Peerapat Kaminthong
- Date of birth: 22 March 1997 (age 29)
- Place of birth: Buriram, Thailand
- Height: 1.72 m (5 ft 8 in)
- Position: Attacking midfielder

Team information
- Current team: Rayong
- Number: 90

Senior career*
| Years | Team | Apps | (Gls) |
| 2017–2019 | Buriram United | | |
| 2018 | → Air Force United (loan) | 4 | (0) |
| 2019 | → Kasetsart (loan) | | |
| 2020 | Bangkok United | 0 | (0) |
| 2020–2022 | PT Prachuap | 4 | (0) |
| 2020–2021 | → Krabi (loan) | 6 | (0) |
| 2022–2024 | Police Tero | 19 | (2) |
| 2024– | Rayong | 19 | (1) |

International career
| 2018 | Thailand U19 | | |
- * Club domestic league appearances and goals as of 26 January 2026

Peerapat Kaminthong (Thai: พีรพัฒน์ ขมิ้นทอง; born March 22, 1997), is a Thai professional footballer who plays as an attacking midfielder for Thai League 1 club Rayong.

== Honour ==
=== International ===
Thailand U-19

- 2017 AFF U-19 Youth Championship: Champion
