= 2020 AFC U-19 Championship qualification =

2020 AFC U-20 Championship qualification
Tournament details
- Host countries: Oman (Group A); Qatar (Group B); Tajikistan (Group C); Iran (Group D); Bahrain (Group E); Saudi Arabia (Group F); Cambodia (Group G); Chinese Taipei (Group H); Myanmar (Group I); Vietnam (Group J); Indonesia (Group K)
- Dates: 2–6 October and 2–30 November 2019
- Teams: 46 (from 1 confederation)

Tournament statistics
- Matches played: 74
- Goals scored: 325 (4.39 per match)
- Attendance: 88,413 (1,195 per match)
- Top scorer: (Thailand) Suphanat Mueanta (9 goals)

The 2020 AFC U-19 Championship qualification was an international men's under-19 football competition which was originally held to decide the participating teams of the 2020 AFC U-19 Championship. The AFC announced the cancellation of the final tournament due to the COVID-19 pandemic on 25 January 2021.

== Draw ==
Of the 47 AFC member associations, 46 teams entered the competition.

The draw was held on 9 May 2019 at the AFC House in Kuala Lumpur, Malaysia.

- West: 25 teams from West Asia, Central Asia and South Asia, to be drawn into six groups: one group of five teams and five groups of four teams (Groups A–F).
- East: 21 teams from ASEAN and East Asia, to be drawn into five groups: one group of five teams and four groups of four teams (Groups G–K).

The teams were seeded in each zone according to their performance in the 2018 AFC U-19 Championship final tournament and qualification (overall ranking shown in parentheses; NR stands for non-ranked teams). The following restrictions were also applied:

- The eleven teams which indicated their intention to serve as qualification group hosts prior to the draw were drawn into separate groups.

	Pot 1	Pot 2	Pot 3	Pot 4	Pot 5
West Zone	1. **Saudi Arabia** (1) **(H)**; 2. **Qatar** (3) **(H)**; 3. **Tajikistan** (6) **(H)**; 4. United Arab Emirates (9); 5. Jordan (10); 6. **Iraq** (14) ~~**(H)**~~	7. **Uzbekistan** (18) **(Q)**; 8. **Iran** (19) **(H)**; 9. **Yemen** (20); 10. Oman (21) **(H)***; 11. **Bahrain** (22) **(H)**; 12. Syria (23)	13. Bangladesh (24); 14. India (25); 15. Lebanon (27); 16. Kyrgyzstan (31); 17. Palestine (32); 18. Turkmenistan (34)	19. Maldives (37); 20. Sri Lanka (39); 21. Nepal (40)	22. Afghanistan (NR); 23. Bhutan (NR); 24. Kuwait (NR); 25. Pakistan (NR)
East Zone	1. **South Korea** (2); 2. **Japan** (4); 3. Thailand (5); 4. **Australia** (7); 5. **Indonesia** (8) **(H)**	6. China (11); 7. North Korea (12); 8. **Malaysia** (13); 9. **Vietnam** (15) **(H)**; 10. Chinese Taipei (16) **(H)**	11. **Cambodia** (17) **(H)**; 12. Myanmar (26) **(H)**; 13. Macau (28); 14. Hong Kong (29); 15. Mongolia (30)	16. **Laos** (33); 17. Singapore (35); 18. Timor-Leste (36); 19. Brunei (38)	20. Guam (NR); 21. Northern Mariana Islands (NR)

Notes

- Teams in **bold** qualified for the final tournament.
- (H): Qualification group hosts (* Oman replaced Iraq as group hosts after the draw)
- (Q): Final tournament hosts, automatically qualified regardless of qualification results

Did not enter
West Zone	None
East Zone	Philippines

== Player eligibility ==
Players born on or after 1 January 2001 were eligible to compete in the tournament.

== Format ==
In each group, teams played each other once at a centralised venue. The eleven group winners and the four best runners-up qualified for the final tournament. As Uzbekistan (who were the designated final tournament hosts) were among the four best runners-up, the fifth best runner-up also qualified for the final tournament.

=== Tiebreakers ===
Teams were ranked according to points (3 points for a win, 1 point for a draw, 0 points for a loss), and if tied on points, the following tiebreaking criteria are applied, in the order given, to determine the rankings (Regulations Article 9.3):

1. Points in head-to-head matches among tied teams;
2. Goal difference in head-to-head matches among tied teams;
3. Goals scored in head-to-head matches among tied teams;
4. If more than two teams are tied, and after applying all head-to-head criteria above, a subset of teams are still tied, all head-to-head criteria above are reapplied exclusively to this subset of teams;
5. Goal difference in all group matches;
6. Goals scored in all group matches;
7. Penalty shoot-out if only two teams are tied and they met in the last round of the group;
8. Disciplinary points (yellow card = 1 point, red card as a result of two yellow cards = 3 points, direct red card = 3 points, yellow card followed by direct red card = 4 points);
9. Drawing of lots.

== Groups ==
=== Group A ===
- All matches were held in Oman.
- Times listed are UTC+4.
- Iraq was initially announced as the hosts of the group, with the matches scheduled to be played between 2–10 November. Following the 2019 Iraqi protests, matches were postponed to a later time and venue, which was subsequently confirmed to be between 22 and 30 November 2019 in Oman.

Pos	Team	Pld	W	D	L	GF	GA	GD	Pts	Qualification
1	Iraq	4	2	2	0	10	5	+5	8	Final tournament
2	Kuwait	4	2	2	0	9	5	+4	8	
3	Palestine	4	2	1	1	10	7	+3	7	
4	Oman (H)	4	1	1	2	4	7	−3	4	
5	Pakistan	4	0	0	4	2	11	−9	0	

Source: AFC
Rules for classification: Qualification tiebreakers
(H) Hosts
22 November 2019
16:00

Pakistan	1–2	Kuwait
Waheed 27'	Report	Al-Bous 28'; Karam 57'

Al-Seeb Stadium, Seeb
Attendance: 100
Referee: Hasan Akrami (Iran)
22 November 2019
19:00

Palestine	1–0	Oman
Bani Odeh 19'	Report

Al-Seeb Stadium, Seeb
Attendance: 452
Referee: Ahmad Yacoub Ibrahim (Jordan)

24 November 2019
16:00

Kuwait	1–1	Iraq
Al-Ajmi 72'	Report	Zeyad 29'

Al-Seeb Stadium, Seeb
Attendance: 223
Referee: Ali Reda (Lebanon)
24 November 2019
19:00

Pakistan	1–5	Palestine
Waheed 30'	Report	Dahamshi 13', 26', 65'; Al-Nabris 46', 73'

Al-Seeb Stadium, Seeb
Attendance: 100
Referee: Sadullo Gulmurodi (Tajikistan)

26 November 2019
16:00

Iraq	3–0	Pakistan
Abdullah 8'; Shawqi 24', 36'	Report

Al-Seeb Stadium, Seeb
Attendance: 200
Referee: Saoud Al-Athbah (Qatar)
26 November 2019
19:00

Oman	0–3	Kuwait
	Report	E. Marzouq 48', 55'; Al-Ajmi 84'

Al-Seeb Stadium, Seeb
Attendance: 198
Referee: Hasan Akrami (Iran)

28 November 2019
16:00

Palestine	1–3	Iraq
A. Mohammed 34' (o.g.)	Report	Barhoush 24' (o.g.); Shawqi 67'; Abdullah 73'

Al-Seeb Stadium, Seeb
Attendance: 260
Referee: Ahmad Yacoub Ibrahim (Jordan)
28 November 2019
19:00

Oman	1–0	Pakistan
Al-Maashari 10'	Report

Al-Seeb Stadium, Seeb
Attendance: 150
Referee: Sadullo Gulmurodi (Tajikistan)

30 November 2019
16:00

Kuwait	3–3	Palestine
Al-Saab 44'; B. Al-Mutairi 65'; Mahran 86'	Report	Dahamshi 24'; Al-Nabris 33', 66'

Al-Seeb Stadium, Seeb
Attendance: 100
Referee: Ali Reda (Lebanon)
30 November 2019
19:00

Iraq	3–3	Oman
M. Mohammed 34'; Abdullah 50'; A. Mohammed 90+4'	Report	Al-Salti 22'; Al-Hadabi 27', 45+2'

Al-Seeb Stadium, Seeb
Attendance: 380
Referee: Saoud Al-Athbah (Qatar)

=== Group B ===
- All matches were held in Qatar.
- Times listed are UTC+3.

Pos	Team	Pld	W	D	L	GF	GA	GD	Pts	Qualification
1	Qatar (H)	3	2	1	0	10	3	+7	7	Final tournament
2	Yemen	3	2	1	0	6	2	+4	7	Final tournament
3	Turkmenistan	3	1	0	2	6	8	−2	3	
4	Sri Lanka	3	0	0	3	3	12	−9	0	

Source: AFC
Rules for classification: Qualification tiebreakers
(H) Hosts
6 November 2019
17:10

Yemen	2–1	Turkmenistan
Al-Thulaia 15' (pen.); Maher 36'	Report	Sekow 48'

Aspire 4, Doha
Attendance: 300
Referee: Tejas Nagvenkar (India)
6 November 2019
19:20

Qatar	5–1	Sri Lanka
Tombari 5', 44'; Esam 19'; Deshan 59' (o.g.); Al-Zarra 63'	Report	Razooniya 45'

Aspire 5, Doha
Attendance: 500
Referee: Hussein Abo Yehia (Lebanon)

8 November 2019
17:10

Sri Lanka	0–3	Yemen
	Report	Al-Godaimah 12'; Al-Harbi 18'; Sadeq 36'

Aspire 4, Doha
Attendance: 812
Referee: Yusuke Araki (Japan)
8 November 2019
19:20

Turkmenistan	1–4	Qatar
Myratberdiýew 58'	Report	Abdulraheem 51', 63'; Tombari 68', 81'

Aspire 5, Doha
Attendance: 594
Referee: Kim Hee-gon (South Korea)

10 November 2019
17:10

Turkmenistan	4–2	Sri Lanka
Çopanow 63'; Borjakow 67'; Hydyrow 78'; Myratberdiýew 89'	Report	Sajid 43', 80'

Aspire 4, Doha
Attendance: 60
Referee: Tejas Nagvenkar (India)
10 November 2019
19:20

Qatar	1–1	Yemen
Abdulraheem 42'	Report	Maher 53'

Aspire 5, Doha
Attendance: 811
Referee: Yusuke Araki (Japan)

=== Group C ===
- All matches were held in Tajikistan.
- Times listed are UTC+5.

Pos	Team	Pld	W	D	L	GF	GA	GD	Pts	Qualification
1	Tajikistan (H)	3	3	0	0	11	0	+11	9	Final tournament
2	Lebanon	3	1	1	1	3	2	+1	4	
3	Syria	3	1	1	1	4	4	0	4	
4	Maldives	3	0	0	3	2	14	−12	0	

Source: AFC
Rules for classification: Qualification tiebreakers
(H) Hosts
2 October 2019
16:00

Syria	1–1	Lebanon
Ramadan 40'	Report	Mekkaoui 73'

Republican Central Stadium, Dushanbe
Attendance: 300
Referee: Mohammed Al-Hoish (Saudi Arabia)
2 October 2019
19:00

Tajikistan	9–0	Maldives
Rahmatov 4', 88'; Safarov 9'; Samiyev 13', 21', 46'; Zairov 36', 42'; Dhaisam 76' (o.g.)	Report

Republican Central Stadium, Dushanbe
Attendance: 2,920
Referee: Chen Hsin-chuan (Chinese Taipei)

4 October 2019
16:00

Maldives	2–3	Syria
S. Ibrahim 19'; Nazeem 55'	Report	S. Ibrahim 25' (o.g.); Al-Malhem 33'; Ramadan 62'

Republican Central Stadium, Dushanbe
Attendance: 400
Referee: Ali Shaban (Kuwait)
4 October 2019
19:00

Lebanon	0–1	Tajikistan
	Report	Samiyev 46'

Republican Central Stadium, Dushanbe
Attendance: 4,800
Referee: Mohammad Arafah (Jordan)

6 October 2019
16:00

Lebanon	2–0	Maldives
Hijazi 19'; Dakramanji 76'	Report

Republican Central Stadium, Dushanbe
Attendance: 60
Referee: Chen Hsin-chuan (Chinese Taipei)
6 October 2019
19:00

Tajikistan	1–0	Syria
Samiyev 23'	Report

Republican Central Stadium, Dushanbe
Attendance: 5,700
Referee: Mohammad Arafah (Jordan)

=== Group D ===
- All matches were held in Tehran, Iran.
- Times listed are UTC+3:30.

Pos	Team	Pld	W	D	L	GF	GA	GD	Pts	Qualification
1	Iran (H)	3	3	0	0	9	0	+9	9	Final tournament
2	Kyrgyzstan	3	1	1	1	2	3	−1	4	
3	United Arab Emirates	3	1	0	2	4	4	0	3	
4	Nepal	3	0	1	2	0	8	−8	1	

Source: AFC
Rules for classification: Qualification tiebreakers
(H) Hosts
6 November 2019
14:45

United Arab Emirates	4–0	Nepal
N. Gurung 27' (o.g.); Khalfan 38'; Yousuf 71'; Hamad 81'	Report

PAS Stadium, Tehran
Attendance: 115
Referee: Chae Sang-hyeop (South Korea)
6 November 2019
17:45

Iran	3–0	Kyrgyzstan
Barzegar 53'; Monazami 78'; Salmani 82' (pen.)	Report

PAS Stadium, Tehran
Attendance: 482
Referee: Minoru Tōjō (Japan)

8 November 2019
14:45

Kyrgyzstan	2–0	United Arab Emirates
Shigaibaev 39'; Artykbaev 45'	Report

PAS Stadium, Tehran
Attendance: 80
Referee: Ahmad Al-Ali (Kuwait)
8 November 2019
17:45

Nepal	0–4	Iran
	Report	Ahmadi 75'; Jalali 84'; Monazami 86'; Barzegar 90'

PAS Stadium, Tehran
Attendance: 1,316
Referee: Yu Ming-hsun (Chinese Taipei)

10 November 2019
14:45

Kyrgyzstan	0–0	Nepal
	Report

PAS Stadium, Tehran
Attendance: 46
Referee: Chae Sang-hyeop (South Korea)
10 November 2019
17:45

United Arab Emirates	0–2	Iran
	Report	Asadabadi 45'; Hashemnezhad 80'

PAS Stadium, Tehran
Attendance: 1,134
Referee: Minoru Tōjō (Japan)

=== Group E ===
- All matches were held in Bahrain.
- Times listed are UTC+3.

Pos	Team	Pld	W	D	L	GF	GA	GD	Pts	Qualification
1	Bahrain (H)	3	2	1	0	8	1	+7	7	Final tournament
2	Jordan	3	1	2	0	5	2	+3	5	
3	Bhutan	3	1	0	2	2	8	−6	3	
4	Bangladesh	3	0	1	2	2	6	−4	1	

Source: AFC
Rules for classification: Qualification tiebreakers
(H) Hosts
6 November 2019
16:15

Jordan	3–0	Bhutan
Bani Hani 14'; Al-Riyalat 27' (pen.); Semreen 47'	Report

Khalifa Sports City Stadium, Manama
Attendance: 63
Referee: Dmitriy Mashentsev (Kyrgyzstan)
6 November 2019
19:00

Bahrain	3–0	Bangladesh
Sayed 43', 90'; Nemer 90+6'	Report

Khalifa Sports City Stadium, Manama
Attendance: 1,119
Referee: Takuto Okabe (Japan)

8 November 2019
16:15

Bangladesh	1–1	Jordan
Arafat 74'	Report	Afaneh 45' (pen.)

Khalifa Sports City Stadium, Manama
Attendance: 1,950
Referee: Zaid Thamer (Iraq)
8 November 2019
19:00

Bhutan	0–4	Bahrain
	Report	Al-Romaihi 33' (pen.); Sayed 42'; Nemer 45'; Alawi 49'

Khalifa Sports City Stadium, Manama
Attendance: 740
Referee: Qasim Al-Hatmi (Oman)

10 November 2019
16:15

Bangladesh	1–2	Bhutan
Arafat 18'	Report	Y. Dorji 65'; Khando 90+2'

Khalifa Sports City Stadium, Manama
Attendance: 270
Referee: Qasim Al-Hatmi (Oman)
10 November 2019
19:00

Jordan	1–1	Bahrain
Al-Riyalat 74' (pen.)	Report	Al-Romaihi 19' (pen.)

Khalifa Sports City Stadium, Manama
Attendance: 820
Referee: Takuto Okabe (Japan)

=== Group F ===
- All matches were held in Saudi Arabia.
- Times listed are UTC+3.

Pos	Team	Pld	W	D	L	GF	GA	GD	Pts	Qualification
1	Saudi Arabia (H)	3	2	1	0	6	1	+5	7	Final tournament
2	Uzbekistan (Note: Uzbekistan, as final tournament hosts, automatically qualified regardless of qualification results.)	3	2	1	0	5	1	+4	7	Final tournament
3	Afghanistan	3	1	0	2	3	3	0	3	
4	India	3	0	0	3	0	9	−9	0	

Source: AFC
Rules for classification: Qualification tiebreakers
(H) Hosts
Notes:
6 November 2019
15:05

Uzbekistan	2–0	India
Khoshimov 53'; Olimjonov 65'	Report

Prince Saud bin Jalawi Stadium, Khobar
Attendance: 324
Referee: Shaun Evans (Australia)
6 November 2019
19:05

Saudi Arabia	1–0	Afghanistan
Al-Ghamdi 50' (pen.)	Report

Prince Saud bin Jalawi Stadium, Khobar
Attendance: 2,650
Referee: Kim Dae-yong (South Korea)

8 November 2019
15:05

Afghanistan	0–2	Uzbekistan
	Report	Abdumajidov 36'; Rakhimkulov 41'

Prince Saud bin Jalawi Stadium, Khobar
Attendance: 232
Referee: Clifford Daypuyat (Philippines)
8 November 2019
19:05

India	0–4	Saudi Arabia
	Report	Marran 2'; Al-Bassas 10', 17', 28'

Prince Saud bin Jalawi Stadium, Khobar
Attendance: 2,523
Referee: Feras Taweel (Syria)

10 November 2019
15:05

India	0–3	Afghanistan
	Report	Ramaki 2'; Nawshad 4'; Del 29'

Prince Saud bin Jalawi Stadium, Khobar
Attendance: 180
Referee: Feras Taweel (Syria)
10 November 2019
19:05

Saudi Arabia	1–1	Uzbekistan
Al-Sayyali 45' (pen.)	Report	Jaloliddinov 88'

Prince Saud bin Jalawi Stadium, Khobar
Attendance: 2,700
Referee: Shaun Evans (Australia)

=== Group G ===
- All matches were held in Cambodia.
- Times listed are UTC+7.

Pos	Team	Pld	W	D	L	GF	GA	GD	Pts	Qualification
1	Malaysia	4	4	0	0	27	4	+23	12	Final tournament
2	Cambodia (H)	4	3	0	1	18	6	+12	9	Final tournament
3	Thailand	4	2	0	2	31	3	+28	6	
4	Brunei	4	1	0	3	4	26	−22	3	
5	Northern Mariana Islands	4	0	0	4	3	44	−41	0	

Source: AFC
Rules for classification: Qualification tiebreakers
(H) Hosts
2 November 2019
15:30

Northern Mariana Islands	3–4	Brunei
Khoirunnaas 32' (o.g.); Tenorio 42', 90+1'	Report	Eddy 12'; Aminuddin 40'; Hadif 59'; Naqiuddin 90+1'

National Olympic Stadium, Phnom Penh
Attendance: 413
Referee: Choe Kwang-hyon (North Korea)
2 November 2019
18:30

Cambodia	4–5	Malaysia
Met Samel 61'; Chea Sokmeng 65'; Ry Leap Pheng 77'; Soeuth Nava 88'	Report	Shafi 30'; Fakrul 40'; Azrin 42'; Luqman 67'; Muslihuddin 73'

National Olympic Stadium, Phnom Penh
Attendance: 4,685
Referee: Çarymyrat Kurbanow (Turkmenistan)

4 November 2019
15:30

Brunei	0–9	Thailand
	Report	Suphanat 2', 15', 43', 57'; Warakorn 29'; Jakkapong 36'; Kittiphong 48'; Airfan 84'; Purachet 90+4' (pen.)

National Olympic Stadium, Phnom Penh
Attendance: 210
Referee: Mooud Bonyadifar (Iran)
4 November 2019
18:30

Northern Mariana Islands	0–9	Cambodia
	Report	Thy Lieng 7', 42'; Ly Mael 12'; Lim Pisoth 44', 45+1'; Wut Tola 45+2'; Sieng Chanthea 83', 88' (pen.), 90+2'

National Olympic Stadium, Phnom Penh
Attendance: 3,421
Referee: Baraa Aisha (Palestine)

6 November 2019
15:30

Thailand	21–0	Northern Mariana Islands
Chiraphong 14'; Phadungkiat 17', 25', 28', 50', 57'; Suphanat 19', 34', 61', 64', 80'; Achitpol 23', 31', 52' (pen.); Kritsada 36'; Andon 48' (o.g.); Thana 65', 79'; Channarong 68', 71'; Warakorn 74'	Report

National Olympic Stadium, Phnom Penh
Attendance: 50
Referee: Zhang Lei (China)
6 November 2019
18:30

Malaysia	11–0	Brunei
Azrin 17'; Luqman 21' (pen.), 22', 23', 41'; Azam 31', 60'; Aiman 39', 84', 90+2'; Harith 59' (pen.)	Report

National Olympic Stadium, Phnom Penh
Attendance: 261
Referee: Choe Kwang-hyon (North Korea)

8 November 2019
15:30

Malaysia	10–0	Northern Mariana Islands
Aiman 7', 46', 74', 79'; Hazim 9'; Aidil 20'; Fahmi 45+1', 56'; Firdaus R. 64' (pen.); Azrul 66'	Report

National Olympic Stadium, Phnom Penh
Attendance: 328
Referee: Baraa Aisha (Palestine)
8 November 2019
18:30

Cambodia	2–1	Thailand
Met Samel 16'; Sieng Chanthea 26'	Report	Channarong 81'

National Olympic Stadium, Phnom Penh
Attendance: 4,545
Referee: Mooud Bonyadifar (Iran)

10 November 2019
15:30

Thailand	0–1	Malaysia
	Report	Umar 84'

National Olympic Stadium, Phnom Penh
Attendance: 1,324
Referee: Çarymyrat Kurbanow (Turkmenistan)
10 November 2019
18:30

Brunei	0–3	Cambodia
	Report	Lim Pisoth 14'; Keo Oudom 29'; Min Ratanak 85'

National Olympic Stadium, Phnom Penh
Attendance: 4,244
Referee: Zhang Lei (China)

=== Group H ===
- All matches were held in Chinese Taipei.
- Times listed are UTC+8.

Pos	Team	Pld	W	D	L	GF	GA	GD	Pts	Qualification
1	Australia	3	2	1	0	13	2	+11	7	Final tournament
2	Laos	3	2	1	0	10	3	+7	7	Final tournament
3	Chinese Taipei (H)	3	1	0	2	9	7	+2	3	
4	Macau	3	0	0	3	0	20	−20	0	

Source: AFC
Rules for classification: Qualification tiebreakers
(H) Hosts
6 November 2019
16:00

Australia	2–2	Laos
Ruiz-Diaz 64'; Carluccio 78'	Report	Thanouthong 15'; Anousone 44'

National Stadium, Kaohsiung
Attendance: 55
Referee: Bijan Heidari (Iran)
6 November 2019
19:00

Chinese Taipei	8–0	Macau
Cheng Chih-huan 31'; Lin Ming-wei 35', 62', 82', 90'; Yu Yao-hsing 45'; Sandberg 60', 77'	Report

National Stadium, Kaohsiung
Attendance: 128
Referee: Thoriq Alkatiri (Indonesia)

8 November 2019
16:00

Macau	0–6	Australia
	Report	Del Grosso 5'; Roberts 37'; Tilio 40', 55', 67'; Iannucci 49'

National Stadium, Kaohsiung
Attendance: 55
Referee: Sherzod Kasimov (Uzbekistan)
8 November 2019
19:00

Laos	2–1	Chinese Taipei
Anousone 34'; Bounmy 41'	Report	Lin Chun-kai 51'

National Stadium, Kaohsiung
Attendance: 230
Referee: Timur Faizullin (Kyrgyzstan)

10 November 2019
16:00

Macau	0–6	Laos
	Report	Cheang Ka Lok 17' (o.g.); Anantaza 42', 82'; Lou Chon Hei 45+1' (o.g.); Chony 53'; Tee 85'

National Stadium, Kaohsiung
Attendance: 89
Referee: Sherzod Kasimov (Uzbekistan)
10 November 2019
19:00

Australia	5–0	Chinese Taipei
Brook 2'; Roberts 12', 77'; Hu-Josefsson 33' (o.g.); Tilio 52'	Report

National Stadium, Kaohsiung
Attendance: 694
Referee: Timur Faizullin (Kyrgyzstan)

=== Group I ===
- All matches were held in Myanmar.
- Times listed are UTC+6:30.

Pos	Team	Pld	W	D	L	GF	GA	GD	Pts	Qualification
1	South Korea	3	3	0	0	18	1	+17	9	Final tournament
2	China	3	2	0	1	5	4	+1	6	
3	Myanmar (H)	3	1	0	2	8	5	+3	3	
4	Singapore	3	0	0	3	0	21	−21	0	

Source: AFC
Rules for classification: Qualification tiebreakers
(H) Hosts
6 November 2019
15:00

China	2–0	Myanmar
Liu Junxian 10'; Tao Qianglong 67'	Report

Thuwunna Stadium, Yangon
Attendance: 653
Referee: Rowan Arumughan (India)
6 November 2019
18:00

South Korea	11–0	Singapore
Naufal 23' (o.g.); Kwon Min-jae 27', 58'; Oh Hyun-gyu 35'; Choi Se-yun 36', 78'; Kwon Hyeok-kyu 40'; Jung Han-min 43'; Lee Kang-hee 47'; An Jae-jun 60'; Kim Sang-jun 83'	Report

Thuwunna Stadium, Yangon
Attendance: 152
Referee: Ammar Mahfoodh (Bahrain)

8 November 2019
15:00

Singapore	0–2	China
	Report	Tao Qianglong 47', 62'

Thuwunna Stadium, Yangon
Attendance: 254
Referee: Hanna Hattab (Syria)
8 November 2019
18:00

Myanmar	0–3	South Korea
	Report	Heo Yool 14', 29'; Goh Young-jun 17'

Thuwunna Stadium, Yangon
Attendance: 785
Referee: Nazmi Nasaruddin (Malaysia)

10 November 2019
15:00

South Korea	4–1	China
Hwang Jae-hwan 41' (pen.), 90+4'; Kwon Min-jae 72', 89'	Report	Tao Qianglong 59'

Thuwunna Stadium, Yangon
Attendance: 254
Referee: Rowan Arumughan (India)
10 November 2019
18:00

Myanmar	8–0	Singapore
Saw Kyaw Ae 18', 50', 69'; Naung Naung Soe 72'; Hein Htet Aung 77'; Zaw Win Thein 81', 86'; La Min Htwe 90+2'	Report

Thuwunna Stadium, Yangon
Attendance: 312
Referee: Ammar Mahfoodh (Bahrain)

=== Group J ===
- All matches were held in Vietnam.
- Times listed are UTC+7.

Pos	Team	Pld	W	D	L	GF	GA	GD	Pts	Qualification
1	Japan	3	2	1	0	19	0	+19	7	Final tournament
2	Vietnam (H)	3	2	1	0	7	1	+6	7	Final tournament
3	Mongolia	3	1	0	2	4	15	−11	3	
4	Guam	3	0	0	3	4	18	−14	0	

Source: AFC
Rules for classification: Qualification tiebreakers
(H) Hosts
6 November 2019
16:00

Japan	10–0	Guam
Takeda 9', 11', 83'; Sakuragawa 42', 64', 84'; Ayukawa 46', 64'; Kato 59'; Haruyama 64'	Report

Thống Nhất Stadium, Ho Chi Minh City
Attendance: 101
Referee: Omar Mohamed Al-Ali (United Arab Emirates)
6 November 2019
19:00

Vietnam	3–0	Mongolia
Nguyễn Thanh Khôi 64'; Munkhbat 74' (o.g.); Nguyễn Văn Tùng 79' (pen.)	Report

Thống Nhất Stadium, Ho Chi Minh City
Attendance: 1,225
Referee: Khalid Al-Turais (Saudi Arabia)

8 November 2019
16:00

Mongolia	0–9	Japan
	Report	Omori 7', 12', 89'; Haruyama 45+2', 73', 76' (pen.), 87'; Nakamura 49'; Kato 66'

Thống Nhất Stadium, Ho Chi Minh City
Attendance: 125
Referee: Shen Yinhao (China)
8 November 2019
19:00

Guam	1–4	Vietnam
McDonald 33'	Report	Nguyễn Hữu Nam 5', 86'; Đỗ Tấn Thành 28'; Trần Quốc Đạt 32'

Thống Nhất Stadium, Ho Chi Minh City
Attendance: 1,006
Referee: Aziz Asimov (Uzbekistan)

10 November 2019
16:00

Mongolia	4–3	Guam
Oyuntuya 23', 89'; Tuya 28'; Purevsuren 36'	Report	Fernandez 18'; Hennegan 19'; G. Garber 76'

Thống Nhất Stadium, Ho Chi Minh City
Attendance: 268
Referee: Omar Mohamed Al-Ali (United Arab Emirates)
10 November 2019
19:00

Japan	0–0	Vietnam
	Report

Thống Nhất Stadium, Ho Chi Minh City
Attendance: 3,356
Referee: Khalid Al-Turais (Saudi Arabia)

=== Group K ===
- All matches were held in Indonesia.
- Times listed are UTC+7.

Pos	Team	Pld	W	D	L	GF	GA	GD	Pts	Qualification
1	Indonesia (H)	3	2	1	0	8	2	+6	7	Final tournament
2	North Korea	3	1	2	0	6	2	+4	5	
3	Hong Kong	3	1	1	1	3	6	−3	4	
4	Timor-Leste	3	0	0	3	2	9	−7	0	

Source: AFC
Rules for classification: Qualification tiebreakers
(H) Hosts
6 November 2019
15:30

North Korea	1–1	Hong Kong
Ri Jo-guk 66'	Report	Lau Ka Kiu 12'

Madya Stadium, Jakarta
Attendance: 92
Referee: Mahmood Al-Majarafi (Oman)
6 November 2019
19:00

Indonesia	3–1	Timor-Leste
Fajar 2', 77'; Gumario 62' (o.g.)	Report	Mouzinho 51' (pen.)

Madya Stadium, Jakarta
Attendance: 2,297
Referee: Payam Heidari (Iran)

8 November 2019
15:30

Timor-Leste	0–4	North Korea
	Report	Ra Nam-hyon 7'; Ri Kum-hyon 21'; Kim Chol-guk 77'; Ri Jo-guk 90+3'

Madya Stadium, Jakarta
Attendance: 137
Referee: Nivon Robesh Gamini (Sri Lanka)
8 November 2019
19:00

Hong Kong	0–4	Indonesia
	Report	Bagas 25'; Fajar 30'; David 61'; Bagus 90+4' (pen.)

Madya Stadium, Jakarta
Attendance: 3,233
Referee: Nasrullo Kabirov (Tajikistan)

10 November 2019
15:30

Hong Kong	2–1	Timor-Leste
Lau Ka Kiu 45'; Chang Kwong Yin 76'	Report	Elias 18'

Gelora Bung Karno Stadium, Jakarta
Attendance: 976
Referee: Nasrullo Kabirov (Tajikistan)
10 November 2019
19:00

Indonesia	1–1	North Korea
Bagus 61' (pen.)	Report	Kim Kwang-chong 41'

Gelora Bung Karno Stadium, Jakarta
Attendance: 16,291
Referee: Mahmood Al-Majarafi (Oman)

== Ranking of second-placed teams ==
Due to groups having a different number of teams, the results against the fifth-placed teams in five-team groups were not considered for this ranking. Uzbekistan had already qualified as hosts of the final tournament.

Pos	Grp	Team	Pld	W	D	L	GF	GA	GD	Pts	Qualification
1	H	Laos	3	2	1	0	10	3	+7	7	Final tournament
2	J	Vietnam	3	2	1	0	7	1	+6	7	Final tournament
3	B	Yemen	3	2	1	0	6	2	+4	7	Final tournament
4	F	Uzbekistan (Note: Uzbekistan, as final tournament hosts, automatically qualified regardless of qualification results.)	3	2	1	0	5	1	+4	7	Final tournament
5	G	Cambodia	3	2	0	1	9	6	+3	6	Final tournament
6	I	China	3	2	0	1	5	4	+1	6	
7	K	North Korea	3	1	2	0	6	2	+4	5	
8	A	Kuwait	3	1	2	0	7	4	+3	5	
9	E	Jordan	3	1	2	0	5	2	+3	5	
10	C	Lebanon	3	1	1	1	3	2	+1	4	
11	D	Kyrgyzstan	3	1	1	1	2	3	−1	4	

Source: AFC
Rules for classification: 1) points; 2) goal difference; 3) goals scored; 4) disciplinary points; 5) drawing of lots.

== Qualified teams ==
The following 16 teams qualified for the final tournament.

Team	Qualified as	Qualified on	Previous appearances in AFC U-19 Championship^{1}
Uzbekistan	Hosts	17 September 2019	7 (2002, 2004, 2008, 2010, 2012, 2014, 2016)
Iraq	Group A winners	30 November 2019	17 (**1975**, 1976, **1977**, **1978**, 1982, **1988**, 1994, 1998, **2000**, 2004, 2006, 2008, 2010, 2012, 2014, 2016, 2018)
Qatar	Group B winners	10 November 2019	14 (1980, 1986, 1988, 1990, 1992, 1994, 1996, 1998, 2002, 2004, 2012, **2014**, 2016, 2018)
Tajikistan	Group C winners	6 October 2019	4 (2006, 2008, 2016, 2018)
Iran	Group D winners	10 November 2019	20 (1969, 1970, 1971, 1972, **1973**, **1974**, **1975**, **1976**, 1977, 1978, 1992, 1996, 2000, 2004, 2006, 2008, 2010, 2012, 2014, 2016)
Bahrain	Group E winners	10 November 2019	9 (1973, 1975, 1977, 1978, 1986, 1990, 1994, 2010, 2016)
Saudi Arabia	Group F winners	10 November 2019	14 (1973, 1977, 1978, 1985, **1986**, **1992**, 1998, 2002, 2006, 2008, 2010, 2012, 2016, **2018**)
Malaysia	Group G winners	10 November 2019	23 (1959, 1960, 1961, 1962, 1963, 1964, 1965, 1966, 1967, 1968, 1969, 1970, 1971, 1972, 1973, 1974, 1975, 1976, 1977, 1978, 2004, 2006, 2018)
Australia	Group H winners	10 November 2019	7 (2006, 2008, 2010, 2012, 2014, 2016, 2018)
South Korea	Group I winners	10 November 2019	38 (**1959**, **1960**, 1961, 1962, **1963**, 1964, 1965, 1966, 1967, 1968, 1969, 1970, 1971, 1972, 1973, 1974, 1976, 1977, **1978**, **1980**, **1982**, 1986, 1988, **1990**, 1992, 1994, **1996**, **1998**, 2000, **2002**, **2004**, 2006, 2008, 2010, **2012**, 2014, 2016, 2018)
Japan	Group J winners	10 November 2019	37 (1959, 1960, 1961, 1962, 1963, 1964, 1965, 1966, 1967, 1968, 1969, 1970, 1971, 1972, 1973, 1974, 1975, 1976, 1977, 1978, 1980, 1988, 1990, 1992, 1994, 1996, 1998, 2000, 2002, 2004, 2006, 2008, 2010, 2012, 2014, **2016**, 2018)
Indonesia	Group K winners	10 November 2019	17 (1960, **1961**, 1962, 1967, 1969, 1970, 1971, 1972, 1975, 1976, 1978, 1986, 1990, 1994, 2004, 2014, 2018)
Laos	1st best runners-up	10 November 2019	5 (1969, 1970, 1972, 1974, 2004)
Vietnam	2nd best runners-up	10 November 2019	19 (1961^{2}, 1962^{2}, 1963^{2}, 1964^{2}, 1965^{2}, 1967^{2}, 1968^{2}, 1969^{2}, 1970^{2}, 1971^{2}, 1974^{2}, 2002, 2004, 2006, 2010, 2012, 2014, 2016, 2018)
Yemen	3rd best runners-up	10 November 2019	6 (1978, 2004, 2008, 2010, 2014, 2016)
Cambodia	5th best runners-up	30 November 2019	3 (1963, 1972, 1974)

^{1} Bold indicates champions for that year. Italic indicates hosts for that year.
^{2} As South Vietnam

== Goalscorers ==
There were 325 goals scored in 74 matches, for an average of 4.39 goals per match.

9 goals

- (Thailand) Suphanat Mueanta

7 goals

- (Malaysia) Aiman Afif

5 goals

- (Japan) Misaki Haruyama
- (Malaysia) Luqman Hakim
- (Tajikistan) Shahrom Samiyev
- (Thailand) Phadungkiat Artkitkarn

4 goals

- (Australia) Marco Tilio
- (Cambodia) Sieng Chanthea
- (China) Tao Qianglong
- (Chinese Taipei) Lin Ming-wei
- (Palestine) Reebal Dahamshi
- (Palestine) Khaled Al-Nabris
- (Qatar) Mekki Tombari
- (South Korea) Kwon Min-jae

3 goals

- (Australia) John Roberts
- (Bahrain) Abdulrahman Sayed
- (Cambodia) Lim Pisoth
- (Indonesia) Fajar Fathur Rahman
- (Iraq) Hussein Abdullah
- (Iraq) Ali Shawqi
- (Japan) Shingo Omori
- (Japan) Soromon Sakuragawa
- (Japan) Hidetoshi Takeda
- (Myanmar) Saw Kyaw Ae
- (Qatar) Naif Abdulraheem
- (Saudi Arabia) Ahmad Al-Bassas
- (Thailand) Achitpol Keereerom
- (Thailand) Channarong Promsrikaew

2 goals

- (Bahrain) Abdulla Nemer
- (Bahrain) Adel Al-Romaihi
- (Bangladesh) Yeasin Arafat
- (Cambodia) Met Samel
- (Cambodia) Thy Lieng
- (Chinese Taipei) Miguel Sandberg
- (Hong Kong) Lau Ka Kiu
- (Indonesia) Bagus Kahfi
- (Iran) Aria Barzegar
- (Iran) Alireza Monazami
- (Japan) Shun Ayukawa
- (Japan) Hijiri Kato
- (Jordan) Waseem Al-Riyalat
- (Kuwait) Fahad Al-Ajmi
- (Kuwait) Ebrahim Marzouq
- (Laos) Anantaza Siphongphan
- (Laos) Anousone Xaypanya
- (Malaysia) Azam Azmi
- (Malaysia) Azrin Afiq
- (Malaysia) Fahmi Daniel
- (Mongolia) Oyunbold Oyuntuya
- (Myanmar) Zaw Win Thein
- (North Korea) Ri Jo-guk
- (Northern Mariana Islands) Sunjoon Tenorio
- (Oman) Osama Al-Hadabi
- (Pakistan) Muhammad Waheed
- (South Korea) Choi Se-yun
- (South Korea) Hwang Jae-hwan
- (South Korea) Heo Yool
- (Sri Lanka) Muhammed Sajid
- (Syria) Ammar Ramadan
- (Tajikistan) Sharifbek Rahmatov
- (Tajikistan) Islom Zairov
- (Thailand) Thana Isor
- (Thailand) Warakorn Thongbai
- (Turkmenistan) Rahman Myratberdiýew
- (Vietnam) Nguyễn Hữu Nam
- (Yemen) Ahmed Maher

1 goal

- (Afghanistan) Khatam Del
- (Afghanistan) Ahmad Nawshad
- (Afghanistan) Ahmad Ramaki
- (Australia) Lachlan Brook
- (Australia) Jarrod Carluccio
- (Australia) Alberto del Grosso
- (Australia) Gianluca Iannucci
- (Australia) Dylan Ruiz-Diaz
- (Bahrain) Sayed Jawad Alawi
- (Bhutan) Yeshi Dorji
- (Bhutan) Dorji Khando
- (Brunei) Aminuddin Masri
- (Brunei) Eddy Shahrol Izzat
- (Brunei) Hadif Aiman
- (Brunei) Naqiuddin Abdullah
- (Cambodia) Chea Sokmeng
- (Cambodia) Keo Oudom
- (Cambodia) Ly Mael
- (Cambodia) Min Ratanak
- (Cambodia) Ry Leap Pheng
- (Cambodia) Soeuth Nava
- (Cambodia) Wut Tola
- (China) Liu Junxian
- (Chinese Taipei) Cheng Chih-huan
- (Chinese Taipei) Lin Chun-kai
- (Chinese Taipei) Yu Yao-hsing
- (Guam) Kris Fernandez
- (Guam) Graysen Garber
- (Guam) Micah Hennegan
- (Guam) Jacob McDonald
- (Hong Kong) Chang Kwong Yin
- (Indonesia) Bagas Kaffa
- (Indonesia) David Maulana
- (Iran) Mohammadmahdi Ahmadi
- (Iran) Alireza Asadabadi
- (Iran) Mahdi Hashemnezhad
- (Iran) Ahmadreza Jalali
- (Iran) Yasin Salmani
- (Iraq) Abdllah Mohammed
- (Iraq) Muntadher Mohammed
- (Iraq) Hussein Zeyad
- (Japan) Takumi Nakamura
- (Jordan) Danial Afaneh
- (Jordan) Reziq Bani Hani
- (Jordan) Mohannad Semreen
- (Kuwait) Salman Al-Bous
- (Kuwait) Abdulrahman Karam
- (Kuwait) Abdulaziz Mahran
- (Kuwait) Bander Al-Mutairi
- (Kuwait) Fawaz Al-Saab
- (Kyrgyzstan) Ryskeldi Artykbaev
- (Kyrgyzstan) Emir Shigaibaev
- (Laos) Thanouthong Kietnalonglop
- (Laos) Bounmy Pinkeo
- (Laos) Tee Sihalath
- (Laos) Chony Wenpaserth
- (Lebanon) Abdulrazzak Dakramanji
- (Lebanon) Adam Hijazi
- (Lebanon) Karim Mekkaoui
- (Malaysia) Aidil Azuan
- (Malaysia) Azrul Haikal
- (Malaysia) Fakrul Iman
- (Malaysia) Firdaus Ramli
- (Malaysia) Harith Haiqal
- (Malaysia) Hazim Abu Zaid
- (Malaysia) Muslihuddin Atiq
- (Malaysia) Shafi Azswad
- (Malaysia) Umar Hakeem
- (Maldives) Savee Ibrahim
- (Maldives) Hassan Nazeem
- (Mongolia) Uuganbayar Purevsuren
- (Mongolia) Khash-Erdene Tuya
- (Myanmar) Hein Htet Aung
- (Myanmar) La Min Htwe
- (Myanmar) Naung Naung Soe
- (North Korea) Kim Chol-guk
- (North Korea) Kim Kwang-chong
- (North Korea) Ra Nam-hyon
- (North Korea) Ri Kum-hyon
- (Oman) Nibras Al-Maashari
- (Oman) Omar Al-Salti
- (Palestine) Anas Bani Odeh
- (Qatar) Mostafa Esam
- (Qatar) Jassim Al-Zarra
- (Saudi Arabia) Ahmed Al-Ghamdi
- (Saudi Arabia) Mohammed Marran
- (Saudi Arabia) Basil Al-Sayyali
- (South Korea) An Jae-jun
- (South Korea) Goh Young-jun
- (South Korea) Jung Han-min
- (South Korea) Kim Sang-jun
- (South Korea) Kwon Hyeok-kyu
- (South Korea) Lee Kang-hee
- (South Korea) Oh Hyun-gyu
- (Sri Lanka) Shabeer Razooniya
- (Syria) Mohammad Al-Malhem
- (Tajikistan) Manuchehr Safarov
- (Thailand) Airfan Doloh
- (Thailand) Kittiphong Khetpara
- (Thailand) Kritsada Nontharat
- (Thailand) Chiraphong Raksongkham
- (Thailand) Jakkapong Sanmahung
- (Thailand) Purachet Thodsanit
- (Timor-Leste) Elias
- (Timor-Leste) Mouzinho
- (Turkmenistan) Aly Borjakow
- (Turkmenistan) Resul Çopanow
- (Turkmenistan) Şamämmet Hydyrow
- (Turkmenistan) Igor Sekow
- (United Arab Emirates) Abdulla Hamad
- (United Arab Emirates) Eisa Khalfan
- (United Arab Emirates) Khalifa Yousuf
- (Uzbekistan) Odilbek Abdumajidov
- (Uzbekistan) Jasurbek Jaloliddinov
- (Uzbekistan) Ulugbek Khoshimov
- (Uzbekistan) Muzaffar Olimjonov
- (Uzbekistan) Diyorbek Rakhimkulov
- (Vietnam) Đỗ Tấn Thành
- (Vietnam) Nguyễn Thanh Khôi
- (Vietnam) Nguyễn Văn Tùng
- (Vietnam) Trần Quốc Đạt
- (Yemen) Emad Al-Godaimah
- (Yemen) Saqr Al-Harbi
- (Yemen) Mohammed Sadeq
- (Yemen) Mohammed Al-Thulaia

1 own goal

- (Brunei) Khoirunnaas Khalid (against Northern Mariana Islands)
- (Chinese Taipei) Karl Hu-Josefsson (against Australia)
- (Iraq) Abdllah Mohammed (against Palestine)
- (Macau) Cheang Ka Lok (against Laos)
- (Macau) Lou Chon Hei (against Laos)
- (Maldives) Ibrahim Dhaisam (against Tajikistan)
- (Maldives) Savee Ibrahim (against Syria)
- (Mongolia) Buyant Munkhbat (against Vietnam)
- (Nepal) Nabin Gurung (against United Arab Emirates)
- (Northern Mariana Islands) Kirt Andon (against Thailand)
- (Palestine) Muath Barhoush (against Iraq)
- (Singapore) Naufal Ilham (against South Korea)
- (Sri Lanka) Avishka Deshan (against Qatar)
- (Timor-Leste) Gumario (against Indonesia)
