= 2021 FIFA Arab Cup Group C =

Second Group (Group Stage) of 2021 FIFA Arab Cup

Group C of the 2021 FIFA Arab Cup took place from 1 to 7 December 2021. The group consisted of Morocco, Saudi Arabia, Jordan and Palestine.

The top two teams, Morocco and Jordan, advanced to the quarter-finals.

== Teams ==
Draw position	Team	Finals appearance	Last appearance	Previous best performance	FIFA Rankings	
Draw position	Team	Finals appearance	Last appearance	Previous best performance	April 2021 (Note: The rankings of April 2021 were used for seeding for the final draw.)	November 2021
C1	Morocco	4th (Note: This is the first appearance for the Morocco first team at the tournament. The U23 team participated in the 1998 and 2002 editions, while the local (A') team participated in 2012.)	2012 (champions)	Winners (2012)	34	28
C2	Saudi Arabia	7th (Note: This is the sixth appearance for the Saudi Arabia first team at the tournament. The U23 team participated in the 1988 edition.)	2012 (fourth place)	Winners (1998, 2002)	65	48
C3	Jordan	9th	2002 (semi-finals)	Fourth place (1988)	95	91
C4	Palestine	5th	2012 (group stage)	Group stage (1966, 1992, 2002, 2012)	104	98

== Standings ==
Pos	Team	Pld	W	D	L	GF	GA	GD	Pts	Qualification
1	Morocco	3	3	0	0	9	0	+9	9	Advance to knockout stage
2	Jordan	3	2	0	1	6	5	+1	6	Advance to knockout stage
3	Saudi Arabia	3	0	1	2	1	3	−2	1	
4	Palestine	3	0	1	2	2	10	−8	1	

Source: FIFA

In the quarter-finals:

- Morocco advanced to play against Algeria (runners-up of Group D).
- Jordan advanced to play against Egypt (winners of Group D).

== Matches ==
=== Morocco vs Palestine ===
1 December 2021
19:00

Morocco	4–0	Palestine
Nahiri 31'; Hafidi 56', 64'; Benoun 87' (pen.)	Report

Al Janoub Stadium, Al Wakrah
Attendance: 3,843
Referee: Matthew Conger (New Zealand)

Morocco	Palestine

GK	1	Anas Zniti
RB	19	Mohamed Chibi	(yellow card) 40'
CB	13	Badr Benoun (c)
CB	4	Marwane Saâdane
LB	16	Mohamed Nahiri
CM	5	Yahya Jabrane		(substituted off) 83'
CM	8	Walid El Karti		(substituted off) 76'
CM	18	Abdelilah Hafidi		(substituted off) 72'
CF	11	Ismail El Haddad		(substituted off) 72'
CF	14	Karim El Berkaoui		(substituted off) 46'
CF	17	Achraf Bencharki
Substitutes:
FW	9	Walid Azaro		(substituted on) 46'
MF	10	Ayman El Hassouni		(substituted on) 72'
FW	21	Soufiane Rahimi		(substituted on) 72'
MF	6	Mohammed Ali Bemammer		(substituted on) 76'
MF	23	Driss Fettouhi		(substituted on) 83'
Manager:
Hussein Ammouta

GK	16	Amr Kaddoura
RB	5	Mohammed Saleh
CB	15	Abdelatif Bahdari (c)
LB	4	Yaser Hamed
RM	20	Abdalsalam Salama
CM	8	Mohammed Yameen		(substituted off) 89'
CM	3	Mohammed Rashid		(substituted off) 72'
LM	21	Ahmed Qatmish
RF	11	Mahmoud Eid		(substituted off) 72'
CF	9	Tamer Seyam
LF	12	Layth Kharoub	(yellow card) 29'	(substituted off) 72'
Substitutes:
FW	19	Reebal Dahamshi		(substituted on) 72'
MF	23	Mohamed Darwish		(substituted on) 72'
FW	13	Mahmoud Abu Warda		(substituted on) 72'
DF	6	Oday Kharoub		(substituted on) 89'
Manager:
(Tunisia) Makram Daboub

Assistant referees:
Tevita Masakini (Tonga)
Bernard Mutukera (Solomon Islands)
Fourth official:
Saíd Martínez (Honduras)
Video assistant referee:
Shaun Evans (Australia)
Assistant video assistant referees:
Juan Soto (Venezuela)
Ezequiel Brailovsky (Argentina)
Eber Aquino (Paraguay)

=== Saudi Arabia vs Jordan ===
1 December 2021
22:00

Saudi Arabia	0–1	Jordan
	Report	Mardi 62'

Education City Stadium, Al Rayyan
Attendance: 4,777
Referee: Bakary Gassama (Gambia)

Saudi Arabia	Jordan

GK	1	Mohammed Al-Rubaie
RB	12	Saud Abdulhamid (c)
CB	3	Khalifah Al-Dawsari	(yellow card) 56' (yellow-red card) 73'
CB	4	Waleed Al-Ahmed
LB	2	Muhannad Al-Shanqeeti		(substituted off) 69'
CM	11	Bader Munshi		(substituted off) 69'
CM	8	Ayman Yahya
RW	14	Ali Majrashi		(substituted off) 81'
CM	7	Turki Al-Ammar	(yellow card) 47'	(substituted off) 89'
LW	13	Moteb Al-Harbi
CF	10	Abdullah Al-Hamdan		(substituted off) 81'
Substitutes:
DF	17	Meshal Al-Sebyani		(substituted on) 69'
FW	18	Haitham Asiri		(substituted on) 69'
FW	15	Abdullah Radif		(substituted on) 81'
MF	19	Hamed Al-Ghamdi		(substituted on) 81'
FW	23	Mohammed Al-Qahtani		(substituted on) 89'
Manager:
(France) Laurent Bonadéi

GK	1	Yazid Abu Layla
RB	23	Ihsan Haddad	(red card) 53'
CB	5	Yazan Al-Arab
CB	21	Mohammad Al-Dmeiri		(substituted off) 61'
LB	2	Mohammad Abu Hasheesh
RM	10	Yazan Al-Naimat		(substituted off) 61'
CM	8	Noor Al-Rawabdeh
CM	4	Baha' Abdel-Rahman (c)		(substituted off) 71'
LM	13	Mahmoud Al-Mardi		(substituted off) 83'
CF	9	Baha' Faisal	(yellow card) 51'	(substituted off) 83'
CF	16	Ali Olwan
Substitutes:
DF	19	Abdallah Nasib		(substituted on) 61'
MF	14	Ahmad Tha'er		(substituted on) 61'
MF	15	Ibrahim Sadeh		(substituted on) 71'
MF	11	Yaseen Al-Bakhit		(substituted on) 83'
FW	20	Hamza Al-Dardour		(substituted on) 83'
Manager:
(Iraq) Adnan Hamad

Assistant referees:
Djibril Camara (Senegal)
Elvis Noupué (Cameroon)
Fourth official:
Wilton Sampaio (Brazil)
Video assistant referee:
Jair Marrufo (United States)
Assistant video assistant referees:
Fernando Guerrero (Mexico)
Paweł Sokolnicki (Poland)
Tomasz Kwiatkowski (Poland)

=== Jordan vs Morocco ===
4 December 2021
13:00

Jordan	0–4	Morocco
	Report	Jabrane 4'; Benoun 25'; Chibi 45+3'; Rahimi 88' (pen.)

Ahmad bin Ali Stadium, Al Rayyan
Attendance: 7,890
Referee: Facundo Tello (Argentina)

Jordan	Morocco

GK	1	Yazid Abu Layla
RB	6	Hadi Al-Hourani
CB	19	Abdallah Nasib	(yellow card) 66'	(substituted off) 72'
CB	5	Yazan Al-Arab
LB	2	Mohammad Abu Hasheesh	(yellow card) 41'
RM	18	Ahmad Sariweh		(substituted off) 46'
CM	8	Noor Al-Rawabdeh
CM	17	Rajaei Ayed		(substituted off) 46'
LM	13	Mahmoud Al-Mardi		(substituted off) 76'
CF	9	Baha' Faisal (c)		(substituted off) 15'
CF	16	Ali Olwan
Substitutes:
FW	20	Hamza Al-Dardour		(substituted on) 15'
MF	11	Yaseen Al-Bakhit		(substituted on) 46'
MF	4	Baha' Abdel-Rahman		(substituted on) 46'
MF	7	Sharara		(substituted on) 72'
MF	15	Ibrahim Sadeh		(substituted on) 76'
Manager:
(Iraq) Adnan Hamad

GK	1	Anas Zniti
RB	19	Mohamed Chibi
CB	13	Badr Benoun (c)
CB	15	Soufiane Bouftini
LB	16	Mohamed Nahiri	(substituted off) 72'
CM	8	Walid El Karti	(substituted off) 72'
CM	5	Yahya Jabrane
CM	18	Abdelilah Hafidi	(substituted off) 61'
CF	11	Ismail El Haddad	(substituted off) 85'
CF	9	Walid Azaro
CF	17	Achraf Bencharki	(substituted off) 61'
Substitutes:
MF	6	Mohammed Ali Bemammer	(substituted on) 61'
FW	21	Soufiane Rahimi	(substituted on) 61'
DF	7	Hamza El Moussaoui	(substituted on) 72'
MF	23	Driss Fettouhi	(substituted on) 72'
MF	20	Mohamed Fouzair	(substituted on) 85'
Manager:
Hussein Ammouta

Assistant referees:
Ezequiel Brailovsky (Argentina)
Gabriel Chade (Argentina)
Fourth official:
Alireza Faghani (Iran)
Video assistant referee:
Juan Soto (Venezuela)
Assistant video assistant referees:
Rafael Traci (Brazil)
Jun Mihara (Japan)
Leodán González (Uruguay)

=== Palestine vs Saudi Arabia ===
4 December 2021
22:00

Palestine	1–1	Saudi Arabia
Rashid 45+2'	Report	Al-Hamdan 81'

Education City Stadium, Al Rayyan
Attendance: 3,075
Referee: Said Martínez (Honduras)

Palestine	Saudi Arabia

GK	16	Amr Kaddoura
RB	5	Mohammed Saleh
CB	15	Abdelatif Bahdari (c)
LB	4	Yaser Hamed
RW	7	Khaled Salem		(substituted off) 62'
CM	8	Mohammed Yameen		(substituted off) 46'
CM	3	Mohammed Rashid		(substituted off) 79'
LW	2	Mohammed Khalil
RF	11	Layth Kharoub		(substituted off) 62'
CF	9	Tamer Seyam
LF	13	Mahmoud Abu Warda
Substitutes:
MF	6	Oday Kharoub	(yellow card) 66'	(substituted on) 46'
FW	12	Mahmoud Eid		(substituted on) 62'
FW	19	Reebal Dahamshi		(substituted on) 62'
MF	23	Mohammed Darweesh		(substituted on) 79'
Manager:
(Tunisia) Makram Daboub

GK	22	Zaid Al-Bawardi
RB	14	Ali Majrashi		(substituted off) 46'
CB	17	Meshal Al-Sebyani		(substituted off) 46'
CB	4	Waleed Al-Ahmed
LB	16	Sulaiman Hazazi		(substituted off) 84'
CMF	12	Saud Abdulhamid (c)	(yellow card) 59'
RW	15	Abdullah Radif		(substituted off) 60'
CF	19	Hamed Al-Ghamdi		(substituted off) 60'
CF	6	Nawaf Boushal
LW	23	Mohammed Al-Qahtani
CF	9	Firas Al-Buraikan
Substitutes:
FW	8	Ayman Yahya		(substituted on) 46'
DF	5	Naif Almas		(substituted on) 46'
FW	18	Haitham Asiri		(substituted on) 60'
FW	10	Abdullah Al-Hamdan		(substituted on) 60'
DF	13	Moteb Al-Harbi		(substituted on) 84'
Manager:
(France) Laurent Bonadéi

Assistant referees:
Walter López (Honduras)
Christian Ramírez (Honduras)
Fourth official:
Janny Sikazwe (Zambia)
Video assistant referee:
Fernando Guerrero (Mexico)
Assistant video assistant referees:
Eber Aquino (Paraguay)
Rafael Foltyn (Germany)
Jair Marrufo (United States)

=== Morocco vs Saudi Arabia ===
7 December 2021
18:00

Morocco	1–0	Saudi Arabia
El Berkaoui 45+4' (pen.)	Report

Al Thumama Stadium, Doha
Attendance: 8,502
Referee: Andrés Matonte (Uruguay)

Morocco	Saudi Arabia

GK	12	Abdelali Mhamdi
RB	16	Mohamed Nahiri		(substituted off) 75'
CB	3	Achraf Dari
CB	15	Soufiane Bouftini
LB	7	Hamza El Moussaoui	(yellow card) 45+1'
CMF	23	Driss Fettouhi
CM	6	Mohammed Ali Bemammer (c)
CM	10	Ayman El Hassouni
RF	20	Mohamed Fouzair		(substituted off) 75'
CF	14	Karim El Berkaoui
LF	21	Soufiane Rahimi
Substitutes:
FW	11	Ismail El Haddad		(substituted on) 75'
DF	19	Mohamed Chibi		(substituted on) 75'
Manager:
Hussein Ammouta

GK	22	Zaid Al-Bawardi
RB	2	Muhannad Al-Shanqeeti
CB	5	Naif Almas
CB	12	Saud Abdulhamid (c)	(yellow card) 55'
LB	13	Moteb Al-Harbi		(substituted off) 65'
RM	23	Mohammed Al-Qahtani		(substituted off) 46'
CM	8	Ayman Yahya		(substituted off) 82'
CM	7	Turki Al-Ammar		(substituted off) 65'
LM	14	Ali Majrashi	(yellow card) 53' (yellow-red card) 79'
CF	9	Firas Al-Buraikan	(yellow card) 74'	(substituted off) 82'
CF	10	Abdullah Al-Hamdan	(yellow card) 90'
Substitutes:
MF	20	Ibrahim Mahnashi		(substituted on) 46'
FW	18	Haitham Asiri		(substituted on) 65'
FW	15	Abdullah Radif		(substituted on) 65'
DF	16	Sulaiman Hazazi		(substituted on) 82'
MF	19	Hamed Al-Ghamdi		(substituted on) 82'
Manager:
(France) Laurent Bonadéi

Assistant referees:
Martín Soppi (Uruguay)
Carlos Barreiro (Uruguay)
Fourth official:
Saíd Martínez (Honduras)
Video assistant referee:
Leodán González (Uruguay)
Assistant video assistant referees:
Eber Aquino (Paraguay)
Jerson Dos Santos (Angola)
Shaun Evans (Australia)

=== Jordan vs Palestine ===
7 December 2021
18:00

Jordan	5–1	Palestine
Abdel-Rahman 9' (pen.); Al-Dardour 24'; Al-Mardi 82'; Al-Naimat 86', 90+1'	Report	Seyam 44'

Stadium 974, Doha
Attendance: 9,750
Referee: Alireza Faghani (Iran)

Jordan	Palestine

GK	1	Yazid Abu Layla
RB	14	Ahmad Tha'er	(substituted off) 46'
CB	19	Abdallah Nasib
CB	5	Yazan Al-Arab
LB	2	Mohammad Abu Hasheesh
DM	4	Baha' Abdel-Rahman (c)	(substituted off) 75'
RM	7	Mohammad Abu Zrayq	(substituted off) 86'
CM	8	Noor Al-Rawabdeh
LM	11	Yaseen Al-Bakhit	(substituted off) 60'
CF	16	Ali Olwan
CF	20	Hamza Al-Dardour	(substituted off) 75'
Substitutes:
DF	6	Hadi Al-Hourani	(substituted on) 46'
MF	13	Mahmoud Al-Mardi	(substituted on) 60'
FW	10	Yazan Al-Naimat	(substituted on) 75'
MF	17	Rajaei Ayed	(substituted on) 75'
MF	15	Ibrahim Sadeh	(substituted on) 86'
Manager:
(Iraq) Adnan Hamad

GK	16	Amr Kaddoura
RB	5	Mohammed Saleh
CB	15	Abdelatif Bahdari (c)
CB	4	Yaser Hamed
LB	2	Mohammed Khalil		(substituted off) 79'
RM	6	Oday Kharoub
CM	3	Mohammed Rashid
LM	13	Mahmoud Abu Warda
RF	7	Khaled Salem		(substituted off) 79'
CF	19	Reebal Dahamshi
LF	9	Tamer Seyam	(yellow card) 45+2'
Substitutes:
DF	21	Ahmed Qatmish		(substituted on) 79'
FW	12	Mahmoud Eid		(substituted on) 79'
Manager:
(Tunisia) Makram Daboub

Assistant referees:
Mohammadreza Abdolfazl (Iran)
Paweł Sokolnicki (Poland)
Fourth official:
Wilton Sampaio (Brazil)
Video assistant referee:
Abdulla Al-Marri (Qatar)
Assistant video assistant referees:
Jair Marrufo (United States)
Rafael Foltyn (Germany)
Christian Dingert (Germany)
