= 2020 AFC U-19 Championship =

2020 yil U-19 Osiyo chempionati

Tournament details
- Host country: Uzbekistan
- Dates: Cancelled
- Teams: 16 (from 1 confederation)
- Venues: 4 (in 3 host cities)

The 2020 AFC U-19 Championship would have been the 41st edition of the biennial international youth football championship organised by the Asian Football Confederation (AFC) for the men's under-19 national teams of Asia. It was scheduled to take place in Uzbekistan, who had been appointed as the host by the AFC on 17 September 2019. It was originally scheduled to run between 14 and 31 October 2020, but was postponed twice due to the COVID-19 pandemic.

The AFC announced the cancellation of the tournament on 25 January 2021, leaving the hosting rights for the 2023 AFC U-20 Asian Cup with Uzbekistan.

Originally, the top four teams of the tournament would have qualified for the 2021 FIFA U-20 World Cup in Indonesia as the AFC representatives, plus Indonesia who qualified automatically as the World Cup hosts. Due to the ongoing COVID-19 Pandemic, the 2021 U-20 World Cup was also cancelled, with hosting rights for the 2023 FIFA U-20 World Cup still kept with Indonesia.

This edition was expected to be the last to be played as an under-19 tournament, as the AFC have proposed switching the tournament from under-19 to under-20 starting from 2023.

Saudi Arabia were the defending champions.

== Qualification ==
Qualification matches were played in November 2019. Uzbekistan also participated in the qualifiers, even though they had already qualified automatically as hosts.

=== Qualified teams ===
The following 16 teams qualified for the final tournament.

Team	Qualified as	Appearance	Previous best performance
Uzbekistan	Hosts	8th	Runners-up (2008)
Iraq	Group A winners	18th	Champions (1975, 1977, 1978, 1988, 2000)
Qatar	Group B winners	15th	Champions (2014)
Tajikistan	Group C winners	5th	Quarter-finals (2016, 2018)
Iran	Group D winners	21st	Champions (1973, 1974, 1975, 1976)
Bahrain	Group E winners	10th	Runners-up (1986)
Saudi Arabia	Group F winners	15th	Champions (1986, 1992, 2018)
Malaysia	Group G winners	24th	Runners-up (1959, 1960, 1968)
Australia	Group H winners	8th	Runners-up (2010)
South Korea	Group I winners	39th	Champions (1959, 1960, 1963, 1978, 1980, 1982, 1990, 1996, 1998, 2002, 2004, 2012)
Japan	Group J winners	38th	Champions (2016)
Indonesia	Group K winners	18th	Champions (1961)
Laos	1st best runners-up	6th	Quarter-finals (1970)
Vietnam	2nd best runners-up	20th (Note: Between 1959 and 1974 Vietnam competed at AFC tournaments as South Vietnam. A separate North Vietnam state did not join FIFA and they mostly played against other communist and communist-sympathising countries. The team's total appearances included eleven appearances as the South Vietnam national under-20 football team.)	Semi-finals (2016)
Yemen	3rd best runners-up	7th	Group stage (1978, 2004, 2008, 2010, 2014, 2016)
Cambodia	5th best runners-up	4th	Group stage (1963, 1972, 1974)

== Draw ==
The draw of the final tournament was held on 18 June 2020, 16:30 MYT (UTC+8), at the AFC House in Kuala Lumpur. The 16 teams were drawn into four groups of four teams, with the teams seeded according to their performance in the 2018 AFC U-19 Championship final tournament and qualification, with the hosts Uzbekistan automatically seeded and assigned to Position A1 in the draw.

Pot 1	Pot 2	Pot 3	Pot 4
1. Uzbekistan (hosts); 2. Saudi Arabia; 3. South Korea; 4. Qatar	5. Japan; 6. Tajikistan; 7. Australia; 8. Indonesia	9. Malaysia; 10. Iraq; 11. Vietnam; 12. Cambodia	13. Iran; 14. Yemen; 15. Bahrain; 16. Laos

Final Draw
	1	2	3	4
Group A	Uzbekistan	Indonesia	Cambodia	Iran
Group B	South Korea	Japan	Iraq	Bahrain
Group C	Saudi Arabia	Australia	Vietnam	Laos
Group D	Qatar	Tajikistan	Malaysia	Yemen
