= 2026–27 Al Mokawloon Al Arab SC season =

Al Mokawloon Al Arab SC
2026–27 season
- Manager: Samy Komsan
- Stadium: Osman Ahmed Osman Stadium
- Egyptian Premier League: Regular season: 7th
- Egypt Cup: Quarter-finals
- Egyptian League Cup: Group stage

The 2026–27 season is the 54th season in Al Mokawloon Al Arab's existence and the club's second consecutive season in the Egyptian top flight. They are also competing in the Egypt Cup and the League Cup.

== Transfers ==
=== In ===
| Pos. | Player | Transferred from | Fee | Date | Source |
|---|---|---|---|---|---|
| FW | (Palestine) Anas Bani Odeh | (Jordan) Shabab Al-Ordon | Free | 5 July 2026 | |
| FW | (Mauritania) Idrissa Thiam | (Qatar) Mesaimeer | Free | 6 August 2026 | |

== Competitions ==
=== Overall record ===
| Competition | First match | Last match | Starting round | Record | | | | | | | |
| Competition | First match | Last match | Starting round | Pld | W | D | L | GF | GA | GD | Win % |
|---|---|---|---|---|---|---|---|---|---|---|---|
| Egyptian Premier League | 22 August 2026 | | Matchday 1 | 8 | 3 | 2 | 3 | 11 | 8 | +3 | 37.50 |
| Egypt Cup | 10 November 2026 | | | 1 | 1 | 0 | 0 | 1 | 0 | +1 | 100.00 |
| Egyptian League Cup | 8 October 2026 | | Group stage | 2 | 1 | 0 | 1 | 2 | 1 | +1 | 50.00 |
| Total | | | | 11 | 5 | 2 | 4 | 14 | 9 | +5 | 45.45 |

Last updated: 19 November 2026
Source: Competitions

=== Egyptian Premier League ===
Regular season

| Pos | Team | Pld | W | D | L | GF | GA | GD | Pts | Qualification or relegation |
|---|---|---|---|---|---|---|---|---|---|---|
| 5 | Al Ittihad | 8 | 4 | 2 | 2 | 9 | 6 | +3 | 14 | Qualification for the championship play-offs |
| 6 | Modern Sport | 8 | 4 | 1 | 3 | 12 | 10 | +2 | 13 | Qualification for the championship play-offs |
| 7 | Al Mokawloon Al Arab | 8 | 3 | 2 | 3 | 11 | 8 | +3 | 11 | Qualification for the relegation play-offs |
| 8 | National Bank of Egypt | 8 | 3 | 2 | 3 | 9 | 9 | 0 | 11 | Qualification for the relegation play-offs |
| 9 | Smouha | 8 | 3 | 2 | 3 | 5 | 5 | 0 | 11 | Qualification for the relegation play-offs |

Updated to match(es) played on 16 November 2026. Source: Soccerway (regular season)
Rules for classification: 1) Points; 2) Goal difference; 3) Goals scored.

Results summary

| Overall | | | | | | | | Home | | | | | | Away | | | | | |
| Pld | W | D | L | GF | GA | GD | Pts | W | D | L | GF | GA | GD | W | D | L | GF | GA | GD |
|---|---|---|---|---|---|---|---|---|---|---|---|---|---|---|---|---|---|---|---|
| 8 | 3 | 2 | 3 | 11 | 8 | +3 | 11 | 0 | 2 | 1 | 4 | 5 | −1 | 3 | 0 | 2 | 7 | 3 | +4 |

Results by round

| Round | 1 | 2 | 3 | 4 | 5 | 6 | 7 | 8 |
|---|---|---|---|---|---|---|---|---|
| Ground | A | H | A | H | A | H | A | A |
| Result | L | L | W | D | W | D | W | L |
| Position | | | | | | | | |

Updated to match(es) played on 28 October 2026. Source:
A = Away; H = Home; W = Win; D = Draw; L = Loss

Matches

| 22 August 2026 1 | Tala'ea El Gaish | 1–0 | Al Mokawloon Al Arab |
| 17:00 UTC+3 |

| 27 August 2026 2 | Al Mokawloon Al Arab | 2–3 | Al Masry |
| 20:00 UTC+3 |

| 2 September 2026 3 | El Gouna | 0–1 | Al Mokawloon Al Arab |
| 17:00 UTC+3 |

| 9 September 2026 4 | Al Mokawloon Al Arab | 1–1 | Al Ahly |
| 20:00 UTC+3 |

| 15 September 2026 5 | Wadi Degla | 0–2 | Al Mokawloon Al Arab |
| 17:00 UTC+3 |

| 12 October 2026 6 | Al Mokawloon Al Arab | 1–1 | ZED |
| 17:00 UTC+3 |

| 19 October 2026 7 | Sharkia Enppi | 0–3 | Al Mokawloon Al Arab |
| 20:00 UTC+3 |

| 28 October 2026 8 | Zamalek | 2–1 | Al Mokawloon Al Arab |
| 20:00 UTC+3 |

| 24 November 2026 9 | Al Mokawloon Al Arab | v | Canal |
| 20:00 UTC+2 |

=== Egypt Cup ===
| 10 November 2026 Round of 32 | Al Mokawloon Al Arab | 1–0 | Telecom Egypt SC |
| 17:00 UTC+2 |

| 19 November 2026 Round of 16 | Al Mokawloon Al Arab | 1–1 (a.e.t.) (5–3 p) | Canal |
| 17:00 UTC+2 |

=== Egyptian League Cup ===
==== Group stage ====
Group C

| Pos | Team | Pld | W | D | L | GF | GA | GD | Pts | Qualification |
|---|---|---|---|---|---|---|---|---|---|---|
| 1 | Al Ahly | 2 | 2 | 0 | 0 | 6 | 0 | +6 | 6 | Advance to the quarter-finals |
| 2 | Al Mokawloon Al Arab | 2 | 1 | 0 | 1 | 2 | 1 | +1 | 3 | Advance to the quarter-finals |
| 3 | Sharkia Enppi | 1 | 0 | 1 | 0 | 0 | 0 | 0 | 1 | |
| 4 | Petrol Asyut | 2 | 0 | 1 | 1 | 0 | 5 | −5 | 1 | |
| 5 | El Gouna | 1 | 0 | 0 | 1 | 0 | 2 | −2 | 0 | |

Updated to match(es) played on 15 November 2026. Source: EFL
Rules for classification: Group stage tiebreakers

| 8 October 2026 1 | Al Mokawloon Al Arab | 2–0 | El Gouna |
| 17:00 UTC+3 |

| 2 November 2026 2 | Al Ahly | 1–0 | Al Mokawloon Al Arab |
| 20:00 UTC+2 | Bencharki 90+3' |
