= Malaysia national under-19 football team =

National football team

Malaysia Under-19
- Nickname(s): Harimau Muda (Young Tigers)
- Association: Football Association of Malaysia
- Confederation: AFC (Asia)
- Sub-confederation: AFF (Southeast Asia)
- Head coach: Shukor Adan
- Captain: Aysar Hadi
- Most caps: Dominic Tan (20)
- Top scorer: Jafri Chew (13)
- Home stadium: Bukit Jalil National Stadium
- FIFA code: MAS
First colours	Second colours

First international
- (Federation of Malaya) Malaya 12–0 Ceylon (Kuala Lumpur, Malaya; 1959)

Biggest win
- (Federation of Malaya) Malaya 12–0 Ceylon (Kuala Lumpur, Malaya; 1959); Malaysia 12–0 Brunei (Palembang, Indonesia; 13 August 2005)

Biggest defeat
- Israel 9-0 Malaysia (Tokyo, Japan; 3 May 1965)

FIFA U-20 World Cup
- Appearances: 1 (first in 1997)
- Best result: Group stage (1997)

AFC U-20 Asian Cup
- Appearances: 23 (first in 1959)
- Best result: Runners-up (1959, 1960, 1968)

The Malaysia national under-19 football team (also known as Malaysia Under-19 or Malaysia U-19) represents Malaysia in international football competitions in ASEAN U-19 Boys' Championship, AFC U-20 Asian Cup, and FIFA U-20 World Cup, as well as any other under-20 international football tournaments. Playing at the 1997 FIFA World Youth Championship on home soil, they became the first Southeast Asian team to score in a FIFA tournament. The players in the current team mainly consist of players with age within 17 to 19 years old where the oldest players will be below the age requirement of 20 years old when the next U-20 tournament started. The team will also play in other age-restricted tournament as the older or younger side such as U-20 and U-18 when needed.

After the disbandment the of Harimau Muda project, Football Association of Malaysia needed a fresh start for the U-19 team where a new set of players was brought in for the U-23 side with the creation of SEA Games Project 2017 team with the team mainly consisting of players aged around 18 to 21 years old. The set of players who were still under 19 years old can then also be selected to represent Malaysia for the U-20 side tournament with the Under-19 team.

== History ==
The team is considered to be the feeder team for the Malaysia national under-23 football team. It is for players aged 19 and less. Also in existence are national teams for Under-23s (Under-22s and Under-21s), Under-17s and Under-15s. As long as they are eligible, players can play at any level, hence it is possible for one to play for the U-19s, senior side and then again for the U-19s.

=== Harimau Muda Project era ===
After the abysmal performance of Malaysia national football team in international scene, Football Association of Malaysia created Harimau Muda Project where the under-19 side was called to represent Malaysia as a single team club called Harimau Muda C.

Harimau Muda C was formed to provide a bigger pool of players and become a feeder team for Harimau Muda B, as Harimau Muda B did to Harimau Muda A. Harimau Muda C made their debut in the 3rd Division of Malaysian football, the FAM League and fielded under-18 aged players.

The team is aimed at developing Malaysian youth players and will not recruit any foreign nationals in its squad. By entering Harimau Muda C in domestic competitions, FAM hopes to expose top Malaysia under-19 players to competitive matches, thus helping them prepare for international tournaments. As such, Harimau Muda C is one of a small number of football clubs in the world which places an age-restrictions on team members while playing in a national professional league. Harimau Muda C played in the Malaysia FAM Cup from 2013 to 2015 season.

In 2015, Youth and Sports Minister Khairy Jamaluddin, former FAM's Deputy President has stated that the Football Association of Malaysia must disband the Harimau Muda system, stating the Harimau Muda system is no longer relevant, it was not planned for the long term, and the state football associations should take the responsibility to groom potential players.

On 25 November 2015, it was confirmed that the Harimau Muda has disbanded by FAM which means all the players from Harimau Muda A, Harimau Muda B and Harimau Muda C will be returned to their own state team.

== Revival of the team ==
Since Harimau Muda Project was disbanded, the under-19 team enter hibernation state and only recently surfaced again as a formal under-19 national team instead of a club.

=== AFF U-19 Youth Championship ===
Players were called up for international duty along with the international selection as the team represented the nation in the 2016 AFF U-19 Youth Championship in September 2016.

=== AFC U-19 Championship qualifying ===
The team did not qualify for the 2016 edition.

=== FIFA U-20 World Cup qualifying ===
The team was not qualified for the 2017 edition as they were already knock-out from 2016 AFC U-19 Championship qualification.

== International records ==
=== FIFA World Youth Championship ===
FIFA World Youth Championship Record
Year	Round	Position	GP	W	D*	L	GS	GA
(Tunisia) 1977	Did not qualify							
(Japan) 1979	Did not qualify							
(Australia) 1981	Did not qualify							
(Mexico) 1983	Did not qualify							
(Soviet Union) 1985	Did not qualify							
(Chile) 1987	Did not qualify							
(Saudi Arabia) 1989	Did not qualify							
(Portugal) 1991	Did not qualify							
(Australia) 1993	Did not qualify							
(Qatar) 1995	Did not qualify							
(Malaysia) 1997	Round 1	24/24	3	0	0	3	2	9
(Nigeria) 1999	Did not qualify							
(Argentina) 2001	Did not qualify							
(United Arab Emirates) 2003	Did not qualify							
(Netherlands) 2005	Did not qualify							
(Canada) 2007	Did not qualify							
(Egypt) 2009	Did not qualify							
(Colombia) 2011	Did not qualify							
(Turkey) 2013	Did not qualify							
(New Zealand) 2015	Did not qualify							
(South Korea) 2017	Did not qualify							
(Poland) 2019	Did not qualify							
(Indonesia) 2021	Did not qualify							
(Argentina) 2023	Did not qualify							
(Chile) 2025	Did not qualify							
(Azerbaijan) (Uzbekistan) 2027	To be determined							
(Armenia) (Georgia (country)) 2029	To be determined							
Total	Best: Round 1	1/26	3	0	0	3	2	9

**Red border colour indicates tournament was held on home soil.

FIFA World Youth Championship History
Year	Round	Score	Result
1997	Round 1	Malaysia 1 – 3 Morocco	Loss
1997	Round 1	Malaysia 1 – 3 Uruguay	Loss
1997	Round 1	Malaysia 0 – 3 Belgium	Loss

=== AFC Youth Championship ===
AFC Youth Championship Record
Year	Round	Position	GP	W	D*	L	GS	GA
(Federation of Malaya) 1959	Runners-up	2/9	4	3	0	1	26	2
(Federation of Malaya) 1960	Runners-up	2/8	4	3	0	1	16	6
(Thailand) 1961	Round 1	5/10	4	2	1	1	15	7
(Thailand) 1962	Fourth place	4/10	5	2	2	1	11	6
(Federation of Malaya) 1963	Round 1	5/12	5	3	0	2	10	6
(South Vietnam) 1964	Third place	3/10	4	2	1	1	11	7
(Japan) 1965	Third place	3/10	6	3	0	3	6	16
(Philippines) 1966	Quarter-final	5/12	4	2	1	1	8	3
(Thailand) 1967	Round 1	14/14	2	0	0	2	1	10
(South Korea) 1968	Runners-up	2/12	7	4	0	3	9	15
(Thailand) 1969	Quarter-final	5/15	4	1	1	2	4	8
(Philippines) 1970	Round 1	11/17	3	1	0	2	3	5
(Japan) 1971	Quarter-final	5/16	4	2	0	2	3	6
(Thailand) 1972	Round 1	11/17	4	2	1	1	16	3
(Iran) 1973	Round 1	12/14	2	0	1	1	3	6
(Thailand) 1974	Quarter-final	8/16	4	2	0	2	5	7
(Kuwait) 1975	Round 1	15/19	4	0	2	2	3	7
(Thailand) 1976	Round 1	14/15	3	0	0	3	0	9
(Iran) 1977	Round 1	8/13	3	0	2	1	1	4
(Bangladesh) 1978	Round 1	14/18	3	1	0	2	3	9
(Thailand) 1980	did not qualify							
(Thailand) 1982	did not qualify							
(United Arab Emirates) 1985	Withdrew							
(Saudi Arabia) 1986	did not qualify							
(Qatar) 1988	Withdrew							
(Indonesia) 1990	did not qualify							
(United Arab Emirates) 1992	did not qualify							
(Indonesia) 1994	did not qualify							
(South Korea) 1996	did not qualify							
(Thailand) 1998	did not qualify							
(Iran) 2000	did not qualify							
(Qatar) 2002	did not qualify							
(Malaysia) 2004	Quarter-final	8/16	4	2	0	2	4	6
(India) 2006	Round 1	15/16	3	0	0	3	1	7
(Saudi Arabia) 2008	did not qualify							
(China) 2010	did not qualify							
(United Arab Emirates) 2012	did not qualify							
(Myanmar) 2014	did not qualify							
(Bahrain) 2016	did not qualify							
(Indonesia) 2018	Round 1	13/16	3	0	1	2	3	6
(Uzbekistan) ~~2020~~	Qualified, but later cancelled							
(Uzbekistan) 2023	did not qualify							
(China) 2025	did not qualify							
(China) 2027	Qualified							
Total	Best: Runners-up	23/42	89	35	13	41	159	161

**Red border colour indicates tournament was held on home soil.

=== ASEAN U-19 Boys' Championship ===
AFF U-19 Youth Championship Record
Year	Round	Position	GP	W	D*	L	GS	GA
(Thailand) (Cambodia) 2002	Group stage	7/10	4	1	1	2	6	11
(Myanmar) (Vietnam) 2003	Runners-up	2/9	6	5	0	1	16	6
(Indonesia) 2005	Runners-up	2/10	5	3	1	2	21	8
(Malaysia) 2006	Runners-up	2/4	3	1	1	1	4	4
(Vietnam) 2007	Runners-up	2/8	5	3	0	2	13	7
(Thailand) 2008	did not enter							
(Vietnam) 2009	Fourth place	4/8	3	2	0	1	9	3
(Vietnam) 2010	did not enter							
(Myanmar) 2011	Third place	3/10	4	2	1	1	12	1
(Vietnam) 2012	did not enter							
(Indonesia) 2013	Group stage	5/11	5	2	2	1	9	4
(Vietnam) 2014	did not enter							
(Laos) 2015	Fourth place	4/10	6	2	2	2	7	8
(Vietnam) 2016	Group stage	6/11	4	2	0	2	10	7
(Myanmar) 2017	Runners-up	2/11	7	4	2	1	13	5
(Indonesia) 2018	Champions	1/11	6	4	2	0	11	5
(Vietnam) 2019	Runners-up	2/12	7	4	0	3	13	7
(Indonesia) 2022	Champions	1/11	6	4	1	1	11	5
(Indonesia) 2024	Fourth place	4/12	5	2	2	1	18	3
(Indonesia) 2026	Group Stage	6/11	3	2	0	1	9	3
Total	Best: Champions	16/20	79	43	15	22	182	87

**Red border colour indicates tournament was held on home soil.

=== Invited tournament ===
Invited Tournament Record
Year	Tournament	Result	GP	W	D*	L	GS	GA
(Singapore) 2005	Lion City Cup	Champions	4	4	1	0	9	4
(Brunei) 2012	Hassanal Bolkiah Trophy	Round 1	4	1	1	2	3	6
(Brunei) 2014	Hassanal Bolkiah Trophy	Semi-final	6	3	1	2	7	5
(China) 2014	Beijing Hyundai Youth Tournament	Fourth Place	3	0	0	3	1	15
(Japan) 2019	Sanix Cup	Twelfth Place	6	1	1	4	2	14
(Vietnam) 2022	Thanh Niên Cup	Runners-up	4	1	2	1	4	3

== Results and fixtures ==
Win Draw Lose

=== 2026 ===
2 June 2026 ASEAN U-19 Boys' Championship	Malaysia	3–0	Singapore	Medan, Indonesia
20:00 UTC+7	Arif 21'; Abid 39'; Tengku 61'	Report		Stadium: Teladan Stadium; Referee: Lê Vũ Linh (Vietnam)

5 June 2026 ASEAN U-19 Boys' Championship	Brunei	0–4	Malaysia	Medan, Indonesia
16:00 UTC+7		Report	Khalish 22' (o.g.); Arsyad 45+3'; Irfan A. 90+3'; Ierfan H. 90+6'	Stadium: Teladan Stadium; Referee: Iv Tina (Cambodia)

8 June 2026 ASEAN U-19 Boys' Championship	Thailand	3–2	Malaysia	Medan, Indonesia
20:00 UTC+7	Pichaiya 21', 79' (pen.); Pirada 42'	Report	Amar 13'; Arsyad 45+3'	Stadium: Madya Stadium; Referee: Alimardon Bainazarov (Kyrgyzstan)

31 August 2027 AFC U-20 Asian Cup qualification	Indonesia	0–0	Malaysia	Vientiane, Laos
16:00 UTC+7		Report		Stadium: New Laos National Stadium; Referee: Mohamed Deham (Bahrain)

3 September 2027 AFC U-20 Asian Cup qualification	Malaysia	2–2	Australia	Vientiane, Laos
16:00 UTC+7	Fadhlul Hadi 50'; Izzuddin Afif 70'	Report	Neill 4'; Abdul-Rahman 82'	Stadium: New Laos National Stadium; Referee: Zayniddin Alimov (Kyrgyzstan)

6 September 2027 AFC U-20 Asian Cup qualification	Malaysia	2–1	Laos	Vientiane, Laos
19:00 UTC+7	Haziq 7'; Fadhlul Hadi 76'	Report	Odin 60'	Stadium: New Laos National Stadium; Referee: Songkran Bunmeekiart (Thailand)

== Players ==
=== Current squad ===
The following 23 players were selected for the 2027 AFC U-20 Asian Cup qualification in Vientiane, Laos.

Caps and goals as of 8 June 2026 after the match against Thailand.

No.	Pos.	Player	Date of birth (age)	Caps	Goals	Club
23	GK	Faez Iqhwan	3 February 2007 (age 19)	3	0	(Football Association of Malaysia) Johor Darul Ta'zim III
1	GK	Zidan Fazly	17 July 2008 (age 18)	0	0	(Football Association of Malaysia) Selangor III
16	GK	Kaveen Waran	9 May 2008 (age 18)	0	0	(Portuguese Football Federation) FC Vizela U-19
5	DF	Lutfil Hadi	4 September 2007 (age 19)	3	0	(Football Association of Malaysia) Johor Darul Ta'zim III
15	DF	Amar Imran (c)	30 June 2007 (age 19)	2	1	(Football Association of Malaysia) Johor Darul Ta'zim IV
4	DF	Aisy Aqasha	5 March 2008 (age 18)	2	0	(Football Association of Malaysia) Johor Darul Ta'zim IV
11	DF	Haziq Aziz	18 January 2008 (age 18)	0	0	(Football Association of Malaysia) Johor Darul Ta'zim IV
19	DF	Adam Hakimi	2 July 2008 (age 18)	3	0	(Football Association of Malaysia) Johor Darul Ta'zim IV
2	DF	Adam Mustaqim	16 February 2008 (age 18)	0	0	(Football Association of Malaysia) Johor Darul Ta'zim IV
13	DF	Mohamad Helmi	16 April 2007 (age 19)	0	0	(Football Association of Malaysia) Selangor III
22	DF	Airel Husainy	5 February 2007 (age 19)	2	0	(Football Association of Malaysia) Selangor III
3	DF	Syazani Yussairi	5 November 2009 (age 17)	0	0	(Football Association of Malaysia) Mokhtar Dahari Academy
8	MF	Arsyad Aswadi	11 January 2007 (age 19)	3	2	(Football Association of Malaysia) Johor Darul Ta'zim III
12	MF	Arif Aiman	21 April 2007 (age 19)	2	1	(Football Association of Malaysia) Johor Darul Ta'zim III
14	MF	Ilhaam Azani	12 February 2008 (age 18)	3	0	(Football Association of Malaysia) Johor Darul Ta'zim IV
20	MF	Tengku Hasyri	10 August 2008 (age 18)	3	1	(Football Association of Malaysia) Johor Darul Ta'zim IV
21	MF	Naqif Firhad	25 January 2008 (age 18)	2	0	(Football Association of Malaysia) Johor Darul Ta'zim IV
6	MF	Zamil Zaqwan	1 June 2007 (age 19)	0	0	(Football Association of Malaysia) Selangor II
7	FW	Izzuddin Afif	1 March 2008 (age 18)	2	0	(Football Association of Malaysia) Johor Darul Ta'zim III
9	FW	Fadhlul Hadi	1 April 2008 (age 18)	0	0	(Football Association of Malaysia) Johor Darul Ta'zim IV
10	FW	Arayyan Hakeem	13 September 2009 (age 17)	3	0	(Football Association of Malaysia) Johor Darul Ta'zim III
18	FW	Adib Rashidi	16 February 2008 (age 18)	3	0	(Football Association of Malaysia) Selangor III
17	FW	Zarul Aidid	13 April 2007 (age 19)	0	0	(Football Association of Malaysia) Selangor III

=== Recent call-ups ===
The following players have been called up since 2025.

Pos.	Player	Date of birth (age)	Caps	Goals	Club	Latest call-up
GK	Januwaar Gopal	15 February 2007 (age 19)	0	0	(Malaysia) Johor Darul Ta'zim III	2026 ASEAN U-19 Boys' Championship
GK	Farish Farhan Zalani	30 January 2006 (age 20)			(Malaysia) Selangor III	
DF	Irfan Aswad	7 August 2007 (age 19)	1	1	(Malaysia) Selangor II	2026 ASEAN U-19 Boys' Championship
DF	Ierfan Hafizan	12 August 2007 (age 19)	2	1	(Malaysia) Johor Darul Ta'zim III	2026 ASEAN U-19 Boys' Championship
DF	Syazril Izwan	25 December 2007 (age 18)	2	0	(Malaysia) Selangor III	2026 ASEAN U-19 Boys' Championship
DF	Afiq Hakimi	4 January 2007 (age 19)			(Malaysia) Mokhtar Dahari Academy	
DF	Aqim Hazmi Hasmadi	9 June 2006 (age 20)			(Malaysia) Johor Darul Ta'zim IV	
DF	Aiden Ang	5 June 2009 (age 17)			(United States) San Jose Earthquakes	
DF	Reyess Shaqeel Emir	16 January 2009 (age 17)			(England) Eton College	
MF	Danial Hqzeiry	13 March 2007 (age 19)	1	0	(Malaysia) Selangor II	2026 ASEAN U-19 Boys' Championship
MF	Luka Hodak	30 September 2008 (age 18)	1	0	(Croatia) NK Trnje	2026 ASEAN U-19 Boys' Championship
MF	Pravinash Ravindran	23 May 2008 (age 18)	1	0	(Malaysia) MISC–Touchtronics FC	2026 ASEAN U-19 Boys' Championship
MF	Faris Danish	4 July 2006 (age 20)			(Malaysia) Johor Darul Ta'zim III	
MF	Muhammad Ariq Darius Mohd Fharied	31 January 2010 (age 16)			(Qatar) Al-Rayyan Academy	
MF	Alauddeen Afif Fua'ad	22 February 2007 (age 19)			(Malaysia) Johor Darul Ta'zim IV	
MF	Sean Fetterlein	8 February 2008 (age 18)			(Denmark) FC Copenhagen U19	
FW	Abid Safaraz	6 March 2007 (age 19)	3	1	(Malaysia) Johor Darul Ta'zim III	2026 ASEAN U-19 Boys' Championship
FW	Zafran Raiyan	15 August 2007 (age 19)			(Malaysia) Kedah	2026 ASEAN U-19 Boys' Championship ^{PRE}
FW	Dainei Mat Disa	22 March 2006 (age 20)			(Malaysia) Selangor II	
FW	Arami Wafiy Zakimi	30 March 2006 (age 20)			(Malaysia) Johor Darul Ta'zim III	
FW	Faris Danish Asrul	4 July 2006 (age 20)			(Malaysia) Johor Darul Ta'zim III	
FW	Zamirul Hakim	18 November 2005 (age 20)			(Malaysia) Selangor III	
FW	Naim Zainudin	28 March 2006 (age 20)			(Malaysia) Johor Darul Ta'zim III	
FW	Arami Wafiy Zakimi	30 March 2006 (age 20)			(Malaysia) Johor Darul Ta'zim III	

Notes

- ^{PRE} = Preliminary squad
- ^{SUS} = Suspended
- ^{INJ} = Withdrew from the roster due to an injury
- ^{UNF} = Withdrew from the roster due to unfit condition
- ^{RET} = Retired from the national team
- ^{WD} = Withdrew from the roster for non-injury related reasons

=== Top appearances ===
As of matches on 14 July 2018.

Rank	Player	Club(s)	Year(s)	U-19 Caps
1	Dominic Tan	Harimau Muda C	2014–2016	20
2	Jafri Chew	Penang	2013–2016	18
3	Hadi Fayyadh	Johor Darul Ta'zim II	2017–2018	17
4	K. Gurusamy	Harimau Muda	2008–2009	16
5	Fadhli Shas	Harimau Muda	2008–2009	16
6	Shivan Pillay	PKNS U19	2017–2018	16
7	Syahmi Safari	Selangor U19	2013–2017	15

Note: Club(s) represents the permanent clubs during the player's time in the Under-19s.

=== Top goalscorers ===
Rank	Player	Club(s)	Year(s)	U-19 Goals
1	Jafri Chew	Penang	2013–2016	13

Note: Club(s) represents the permanent clubs during the player's time in the Under-19s.

== Coaching staff ==
Malaysia U20 national football team Coaching staff
Roles	Names
Head coach	(Malaysia) Shukor Adan
Assistant coach	(South Korea) Lee Jeyoon
Assistant coach	(Japan) Teshima Atsushi
Goalkeeping coach	(Malaysia) Yong Wai Hwan
Fitness coach	(Japan) Hiroto Yokoyama
Fitness coach	(Malaysia) K. Reuben
Head of high performance and sports medicine	(Australia) Craig Duncan
Performance analyst	(South Korea) Haru Chung
Team analyst	(Malaysia) Zaquan Adha
Physiotherapist	(Malaysia) Nabil Fikri Kamaruddin
Masseur	(Malaysia) Mohd Nazrin Mohd Nor
Kitman	(Malaysia) Suhardi Abang Usop
Team coordinator / Team Manager	(Malaysia) Ong Kim Swee

== Coaches ==
- (Malaysia) Ong Kim Swee (2010–2015)
- (Malaysia) Razip Ismail (2015)
- (Germany) Frank Bernhardt (2015–2017)
- (Croatia) Bojan Hodak (2017–2019)
- (Australia) Brad Maloney (2019–2021)
- (Malaysia) Hasan Sazali Waras (2022)
- (Malaysia) Norzaidi Rohmat (2023)
- (Spain) Juan Torres Garrido (2024)
- (Malaysia) Nafuzi Zain (2026–)

== Head-to-head record ==
The following table shows Malaysia's head-to-head record in the FIFA U-20 World Cup.

Opponent	Pld	W	D	L	GF	GA	GD	Win %
Belgium	1	0	0	1	0	3	−3	0.00
Morocco	1	0	0	1	1	3	−2	0.00
Uruguay	1	0	0	1	1	3	−2	0.00
Total	3	0	0	3	2	9	−7	0.00

== Honours ==
=== International ===
- FIFA U-20 World Cup
  - Round 1 : 1997

=== Continental ===
- AFC U-19 Championship
  - (silver) Runner-up (3) : 1959, 1960, 1968
  - (bronze) Third Place (2) : 1964, 1965

=== Regional ===
- AFF U-19 Youth Championship
  - (gold) Winners (2) : 2018, 2022
  - (silver) Runner-up (6) : 2003, 2005, 2006, 2007, 2017
  - (bronze) Third place (1) : 2011

=== Others ===
- Lion City Cup:
  - (gold) Winners : 2005
- International U-19 Thanh Niên Newspaper Cup:
  - (silver) Runner-up : 2022

== See also ==
- Malaysia national football team
- Malaysia women's national football team
- Malaysia national under-23 football team
- Malaysia national under-22 football team
- Malaysia national under-16 football team
