= Tao Qianglong =

Chinese association football player

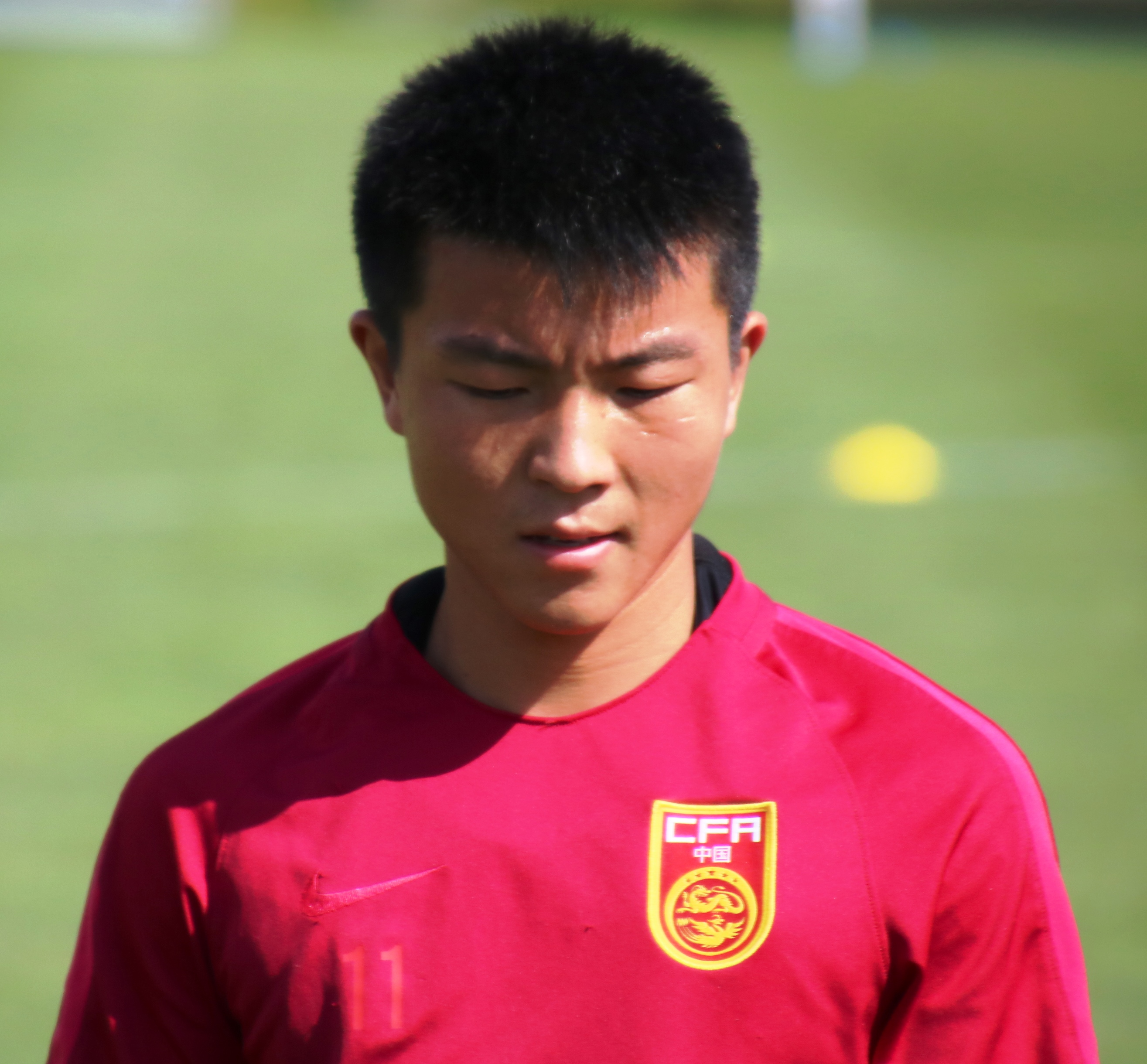
- Tao Qianglong playing for China U-20 in 2018.

Personal information
- Date of birth: 20 November 2001 (age 24)
- Place of birth: Fuyang, Anhui, China
- Height: 1.72 m (5 ft 8 in)
- Position: Winger

Team information
- Current team: Zhejiang FC
- Number: 7

Youth career
- Villarreal
- –2017: Beijing Guoan
- 2018–2019: Hebei China Fortune

Senior career*
Years	Team	Apps	(Gls)
2019	Hebei China Fortune	18	(1)
2020–2021	Dalian Pro	14	(2)
2022–2024	Wuhan Three Towns	46	(4)
2025–	Zhejiang FC	47	(12)

International career^{‡}
2016	China U16	6	(2)
2017–2019	China U19	13	(3)
2022–2024	China U23	18	(8)
2022–	China	7	(0)
Medal record
Representing China
Men's football
EAFF Championship
Bronze medal – third place	2022 Japan	Team
Bronze medal – third place	2025 South Korea	Team
- * Club domestic league appearances and goals as of 19 November 2026 ‡ National team caps and goals as of 27 July 2022

Tao Qianglong (simplified Chinese: 陶强龙; traditional Chinese: 陶強龍; pinyin: Táo Qiánglóng; born 20 November 2001) is a Chinese professional footballer who plays as a winger for Chinese Super League club Zhejiang FC and the China national team.

== Club career ==
In 2013, Tao was scouted as a promising youngster and invited to train with the youth teams of Spanish side Villarreal. He would return to China and would play for the Beijing Guoan youth teams setup and the various age groups for the Chinese national team, which saw Hebei China Fortune interested in his services. Soon after completing his move to Hebei he was promoted to the first team and was handed his debut in a Chinese Super League game by the Head coach Chris Coleman on 2 March 2019 against Shenzhen F.C. where he came on as a substitute for Yin Hongbo in a 3–1 defeat. The manager would show considerable faith in Tao by continuing to play him, which saw Tao repay his faith in him by scoring his first goal for the club on 13 April 2019 in a league game against Chongqing Dangdai Lifan that ended in a 2-1 loss. By the end of the season Tao had become a regular within the team and fellow top tier club Dalian Professional signed him on 27 February 2020.

On 6 June 2020, the Chinese Football Association issued Tao a six month suspension from playing professional football as punishment and a 300,000 yuan fine along with several of his teammates for breaking COVID-19 prevention regulation rules while he was with the Chinese U19 team for training. This resulted in him missing the whole 2020 league season. On his return the following season he would finally make his debut on 22 April 2021, in a league game against Changchun Yatai in a 2-1 defeat.

On 29 April 2022, it was announced that Tao would join newly-promoted Chinese Super League club Wuhan Three Towns. He would go on to make his debut on 3 June 2022, in a league game against Hebei, which ended in a 4-0 victory. After the game he would go on to be part of the squad that won the 2022 Chinese Super League title.

On 12 February 2025, Tao signed Chinese Super League club Zhejiang FC.

== International career ==
On 24 July 2022, Tao made his international debut in a 0-0 draw against Japan in the 2022 EAFF E-1 Football Championship, as the Chinese FA decided to field the U-23 national team for this senior competition.

== Career statistics ==
As of 31 December 2024

Appearances and goals by club, season and competition
Club	Season	League			National Cup		Continental		Other		Total	
Club	Season	Division	Apps	Goals	Apps	Goals	Apps	Goals	Apps	Goals	Apps	Goals
Hebei China Fortune	2019	Chinese Super League	18	1	0	0	–		–		18	1
Dalian Professional	2020	Chinese Super League	0	0	0	0	-		-		0	0
Dalian Professional	2021	Chinese Super League	14	2	4	1	-		2 (Note: Appearance(s) in CSL Relegation play-offs)	0	20	3
Dalian Professional	Total		14	2	4	1	0	0	2	0	20	3
Wuhan Three Towns	2022	Chinese Super League	6	0	3	2	–		–		9	2
Wuhan Three Towns	2023	Chinese Super League	15	3	2	0	5	0	0	0	22	3
Wuhan Three Towns	2024	Chinese Super League	25	1	1	1	-		-		26	2
Wuhan Three Towns	Total		46	4	6	3	5	0	0	0	57	7
Career total			78	6	10	4	5	0	2	0	95	10

== Honours ==
Wuhan Three Towns

- Chinese Super League: 2022
- Chinese FA Super Cup: 2023
