= Amr Kaddoura =

Footballer (born 1994)

Personal information
- Full name: Amr Jehad Mohammed Kaddoura
- Date of birth: 1 July 1994 (age 32)
- Place of birth: Landskrona, Sweden
- Height: 1.85 m (6 ft 1 in)
- Position: Goalkeeper

Team information
- Current team: Landskrona BoIS
- Number: 1

Youth career
- Landskrona BoIS

Senior career*
Years	Team	Apps	(Gls)
2014–	Landskrona BoIS	204	(1)
2015	→ Höganäs BK (loan)	23	(0)

International career^{‡}
2021–	Palestine	5	(0)
- * Club domestic league appearances and goals as of 11 November 2026 ‡ National team caps and goals as of 9 January 2024

Amr Jehad Mohammed Kaddoura (Arabic: عَمْرو جِهَاد مُحَمَّد قَدُورَة; born 1 July 1994) is a professional footballer who plays as a goalkeeper for Swedish Superettan club Landskrona BoIS. Born in Sweden, he plays for the Palestine national team.

== International career ==
Born in Sweden, Kaddoura represents Palestine at international level. He was included in the national team for the 2019 AFC Asian Cup. He made his international debut on 1 December 2021 in a 4–0 FIFA Arab Cup defeat against Morocco.

== Career statistics ==
=== International ===
As of match played 9 January 2024

Appearances and goals by national team and year
National team	Year	Apps	Goals
Palestine	2021	3	0
Palestine	2022	0	0
Palestine	2023	0	0
Palestine	2024	2	0
Total		5	0
