= Hijiri Katō =

Japanese footballer (born 2001)

Hijiri Katō 加藤 聖
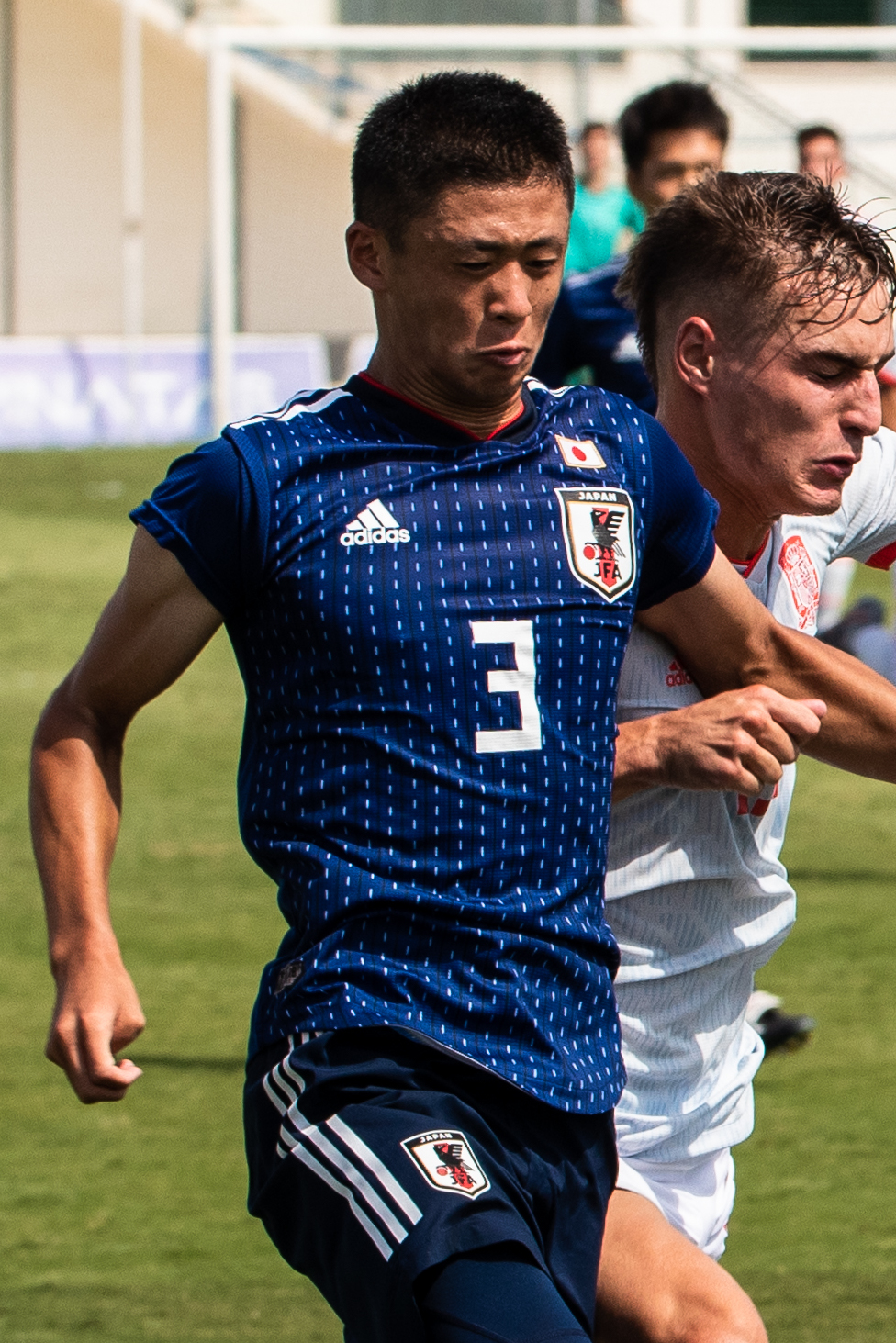
- Katō playing for Japan U19 in 2019

Personal information
- Date of birth: 16 September 2001 (age 25)
- Place of birth: Hyogo, Japan
- Height: 1.71 m (5 ft 7 in)
- Position: Defender

Team information
- Current team: RB Omiya Ardija
- Number: 3

Youth career
- Vissel Kobe
- –2013: Kanokodai FC
- 2014–2019: JFA Academy Fukushima

Senior career*
| Years | Team | Apps | (Gls) |
| 2020–2023 | V-Varen Nagasaki | 61 | (3) |
| 2023–2024 | Yokohama F. Marinos | 13 | (1) |
| 2025 | Fagiano Okayama | 25 | (0) |
| 2026– | RB Omiya Ardija | 19 | (2) |

International career^{‡}
| 2019 | Japan U18 | | |
| 2019 | Japan U19 | 2 | (0) |
- * Club domestic league appearances and goals as of 21:07, 30 March 2026 (UTC) ‡ National team caps and goals as of 27 March 2021, 17:04 (UTC)

Hijiri Katō (加藤 聖, Katō Hijiri; born 16 September 2001) is a Japanese professional footballer who plays as a left-back for J2 League club RB Omiya Ardija.

== Career ==
On 4 September 2019, it was announced that Katō would join V-Varen Nagasaki from 2020 season, along with Asahi Uenaka, a fellow student at JFA Academy Fukushima.

On 27 March 2021, in Katō's second year of playing, he made his professional debut by appearing as a substitute in the match against Omiya Ardija in Matchweek 5 of J2. On 25 August of the same year, he scored his first professional goal in the 24th round of J2 against Zweigen Kanazawa.

On 7 July 2023, Katō officially announced his permanent transfer to Yokohama F. Marinos for the mid-2023 season.

On 8 January 2025, Katō officially announced his transfer to the J1 promoted club Fagiano Okayama for 2025 season. He made his debut in a 2–0 league win over Kyoto Sanga and went on to make 26 appearances across all competitions.

After just one season with Fagiano Okayama, in December 2025 Katō joined J2 League club RB Omiya Ardija.

== Career statistics ==
As of match played 6 June 2026

Appearances and goals by club, season and competition
| Club | Season | League | | | Emperor's Cup | | J.League Cup | | Continental | | Total | |
| Club | Season | Division | Apps | Goals | Apps | Goals | Apps | Goals | Apps | Goals | Apps | Goals |
|---|---|---|---|---|---|---|---|---|---|---|---|---|
| V-Varen Nagasaki | 2021 | J2 League | 21 | 2 | 3 | 0 | — | | — | | 24 | 2 |
| V-Varen Nagasaki | 2022 | J2 League | 35 | 1 | 0 | 0 | — | | — | | 35 | 1 |
| V-Varen Nagasaki | 2023 | J2 League | 5 | 0 | 0 | 0 | — | | — | | 5 | 0 |
| V-Varen Nagasaki | Total | | 61 | 3 | 3 | 0 | 0 | 0 | 0 | 0 | 64 | 3 |
| Yokohama F. Marinos | 2023 | J1 League | 0 | 0 | 0 | 0 | 1 | 0 | 2 (Note: Appearances in AFC Champions League Elite) | 0 | 3 | 0 |
| Yokohama F. Marinos | 2024 | J1 League | 13 | 1 | 4 | 0 | 1 | 0 | 4 | 0 | 22 | 1 |
| Yokohama F. Marinos | Total | | 13 | 1 | 4 | 0 | 2 | 0 | 6 | 0 | 25 | 1 |
| Fagiano Okayama | 2025 | J1 League | 25 | 0 | — | | 1 | 0 | — | | 26 | 0 |
| RB Omiya Ardija | 2026 | J2/J3 (100) | 19 | 2 | — | | — | | — | | 19 | 2 |
| Career total | | | 118 | 6 | 7 | 0 | 3 | 0 | 6 | 0 | 134 | 6 |
