= Mohammad Abu Hashish =

Jordanian professional footballer

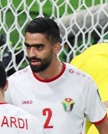
- Abu-Hashish with Jordan at the 2023 AFC Asian Cup.

Personal information
- Birth name: Mohammad Ali Hasan Abu Hashish
- Date of birth: May 9, 1995 (age 31)
- Place of birth: Iraq
- Height: 1.77 m (5 ft 9 1/2 in)
- Position: Left-back

Team information
- Current team: Al-Karma

Senior career*
Years	Team	Apps	(Gls)
2019–2020	Al-Baqa'a		
2020–2022	Al-Salt		
2022–2023	Al-Wehdat		
2023	Al-Zawraa		
2023–2024	Al Ahed		
2024–2025	Zakho	35	(1)
2025–	Al-Karma	7	(0)

International career^{‡}
2021–	Jordan	55	(1)
Medal record
Representing Jordan
Men's football
FIFA Arab Cup
Runner-up	2025 Qatar	Team
- * Club domestic league appearances and goals as of 22 November 2025 ‡ National team caps and goals as of 8 November 2026

Mohammad Ali Hasan Abu Hashish (Arabic: مُحَمَّد عَلِيّ حَسَن أَبُو حَشِيش; born 9 May 1995) is a professional footballer who plays as a left-back for Iraq Stars League side Al-Karma. Born in Iraq, he represents the Jordan national team.

== Club career ==
Abu Hashish began his senior career with the Jordanian club Al-Baqa'a, before moving to Al-Salt in 2020.

On 1 February 2022, he moved to Al-Wehdat and helped them win the 2022 Jordanian Pro League.

On 10 January 2023, he transferred to the Iraqi club Al-Zawraa on a short-term contract.

On 10 July 2023 he moved to the Lebanese club Al Ahed.

On 15 August 2024, Abu Hashish moved to Iraq Stars League club Zakho.

On 3 August 2025, Abu Hashish joined Al-Karma.

== International career ==
Eligible for Jordan and Iraq, Abu Hashish was first called up to the senior Jordan national team in a friendly 2–1 win over Bahrain on 7 September 2021. He represented Jordan at the 2021 FIFA Arab Cup. He was called up to the national team for the 2023 AFC Asian Cup.

On 17 May 2026, Abu Hashish was named in Jordan's 30-men preliminary squad for the 2026 FIFA World Cup.

=== International goals ===
Scores and results list Jordan goal tally first.

No	Date	Venue	Opponent	Score	Result	Competition
1.	6 December 2025	Al Bayt Stadium, Al Khor, Qatar	Egypt	1–0	3–0	2025 FIFA Arab Cup

== Honours ==
Al-Wehdat

- Jordanian Pro League: 2022

Al Ahed

- AFC Cup runner-up: 2023–24
- Lebanese Federation Cup: 2023
