= Mohammed Khalil =

Palestinian professional footballer

Personal information
- Birth name: Mohammed Abdulkarim Mohammed Khalil
- Date of birth: April 5, 1998 (age 28)
- Place of birth: Ramallah, West bank
- Height: 1.82 m (5 ft 11 1/2 in)
- Position: Left-back

Team information
- Current team: Al-Hilal SC (Benghazi)
- Number: 71

Senior career*
Years	Team	Apps	(Gls)
2015–2018	Al-Bireh		
2018–2019	Hilal Areeha		
2019–2021	Al-Bireh		
2021–2024	Hilal Al-Quds		
2024	Asaria		
2024–	Al-Hilal SC (Benghazi)		

International career
2020–	Palestine	18	(0)
- * Club domestic league appearances and goals

Mohammed Abdulkarim Mohammed Khalil (Arabic: محمد خليل; born 5 April 1998) is a Palestinian professional footballer who plays as a left-back for Asaria and the Palestine national team.

== Career ==
Khalil began his senior career with Al-Bireh in the Palestinian second division in 2015, in the 2016–17 season helped them earn promotion to the West Bank Premier League. In 2018 he had a year-long stint with Hilal Areeha before returning to Al-Bireh. In 2021, he transferred to Hilal Al-Quds. On 7 July 2022, he extended his contract with Hilal Al-Quds for another season. In February 2024, he transferred to the Libyan club Ascharara.

== International ==
Khalil debuted with the senior Palestine national team in a 2–0 friendly win over Bangladesh on 15 January 2020. He made the squad for the 2021 FIFA Arab Cup. He made the final squad for Palestine for the 2023 AFC Asian Cup.
