= Makram Daboub =

Tunisian football coach

Personal information
- Full name: Makram Daboub
- Date of birth: 30 December 1972 (age 53)
- Place of birth: Tunis, Tunisia
- Height: 1.81 m (5 ft 11 in)
- Position: Goalkeeper

Senior career*
Years	Team	Apps	(Gls)
1989–1993	Espérance de Tunis		(0)
1993–2009	Espérance de Zarzis		(0)

Managerial career
- 2010–2021: Palestine (assistant)
- 2021–2024: Palestine
- * Club domestic league appearances and goals

Makram Daboub (Arabic: مكرم دبوب; born 30 December 1972) is a Tunisian football coach and former player. He was most recently the head coach of the Palestinian national team. He worked as a goalkeeper coach for the Olympic team. Daboub managed the local team that won the 2020 Bangabandhu Cup in Bangladesh.

Before his promotion to coach Palestine in April 2021, he was a goalkeeper coach.

During his club career, he spent time at Espérance Sportive de Tunis during his upbringing. He retired as a player in 2009 after a lengthy stay at Espérance Sportive de Zarzis.

== Managerial career ==
Despite gaining only 8 points in a group that seemed within their grasp, Palestine managed to advance to the third and crucial stage of qualification for the 2026 World Cup finals. During the recent game, where the result did not impact the standings, the team suffered a 5–0 defeat against Australia. The calls from Palestinian fans intensified, calling for the replacement of Daboub with a more experienced coach to guide the team in the upcoming matches. A lot rumor runs behind the curtains and then comes an impressive draw (1-1) against South Korea. Despite this last result, on December 3rd, 2024, Daboub, who was in charge since April 2021 (30 games: 12w-8d-13l), must leave the seat in favor of Ihad Abou Jazar who was until this date the manager of the Palestinian U23 selection.
