= Liu Junxian =

Chinese association football player

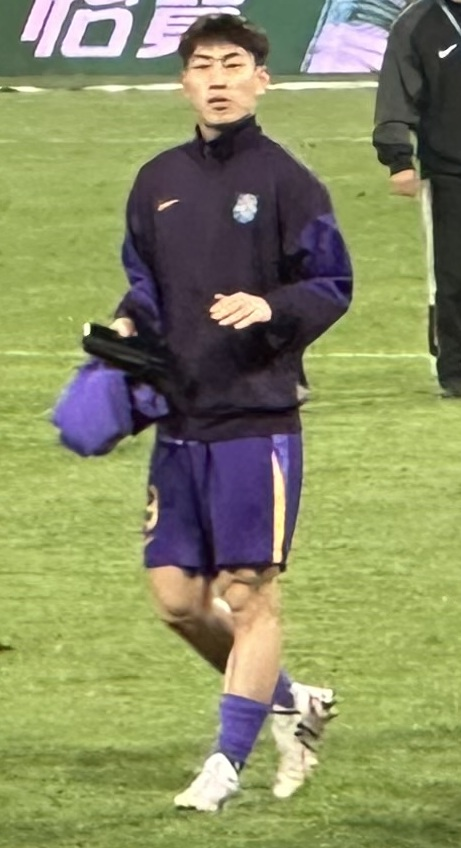
- Liu Junxian in April 2025

Personal information
- Date of birth: 25 January 2001 (age 25)
- Place of birth: Yichang, Hubei, China
- Height: 1.78 m (5 ft 10 in)
- Position: Forward

Team information
- Current team: Tianjin Jinmen Tiger
- Number: 19

Youth career
- 2010–2019: Shandong Luneng Taishan
- 2019–2020: Vizela

Senior career*
Years	Team	Apps	(Gls)
2020–2021	Vizela	0	(0)
2020–2021	→ Pedras Salgadas (loan)	3	(0)
2021–2022	Wuhan Yangtze River	6	(0)
2021	→ China U20 (loan)	19	(1)
2023	Guangxi Pingguo Haliao	6	(1)
2024–	Tianjin Jinmen Tiger	43	(2)

International career^{‡}
2018	China U16	9	(1)
2019	China U18	2	(0)
2022–2024	China U23	6	(1)
- * Club domestic league appearances and goals as of 22 November 2026 ‡ National team caps and goals as of 00:01, 25 December 2021 (UTC)

Liu Junxian (Chinese: 刘俊贤; born 25 January 2001) is a Chinese footballer currently playing as a forward for Tianjin Jinmen Tiger.

== Club career ==
Liu Junxian started his football career in October 2010 when he joined Shandong Luneng Taishan's youth team set-up. As he progressed through their ranks he participated in exchanges and training with clubs in Europe and Brazil on several occasions as well as also representing Shandong U-18 team in the 2017 National Games of China. One of his exchanges in Europe became permanent when he joined Portuguese club Vizela. To gain playing time Liu was loaned out to Pedras Salgadas.

On 14 July 2021, Liu returned to China and transferred to top tier club Wuhan Yangtze River. Liu was called up to the China U20 football team, who were allowed to participate within the Chinese pyramid to compete in the 2021 China League Two campaign. At the end of the 2022 Chinese Super League season, Wuhan were relegated. On 25 January 2023, the club announced that it had dissolved due to financial difficulties. He transferred on a free to second tier club Guangxi Pingguo Haliao on 3 August 2023.

On 24 February 2024, Liu transferred to top tier club Tianjin Jinmen Tiger. He made his debut for the team in league game on 10 March 2024, in a 4-0 victory against Shenzhen Peng City, coming on as a substitute for Wang Qiuming. This would be followed by his first goal for the club on 29 June 2024, in a league game against Shenzhen Peng City in a 3-0 victory.

== Career statistics ==
=== Club ===
As of 27 May 2026.

Club	Season	League			Cup		Continental		Other		Total	
Club	Season	Division	Apps	Goals	Apps	Goals	Apps	Goals	Apps	Goals	Apps	Goals
Vizela	2020–21	Liga Portugal 2	0	0	0	0	-		0	0	0	0
Pedras Salgadas (loan)	2020–21	Campeonato de Portugal	3	0	0	0	-		0	0	3	0
Wuhan FC	2021	Chinese Super League	3	0	3	2	-		0	0	6	2
Wuhan FC	2022	Chinese Super League	3	0	1	0	-		0	0	4	0
Wuhan FC	Total		6	0	4	2	0	0	0	0	10	2
China U20 (loan)	2021	China League Two	13	1	2	2	-		6 (Note: Appearances in the China League Two relegation stage)	0	21	3
Guangxi Pingguo Haliao	2023	China League One	6	1	0	0	-		0	0	6	1
Tianjin Jinmen Tiger	2024	Chinese Super League	11	1	2	0	-		0	0	13	1
Tianjin Jinmen Tiger	2025	Chinese Super League	22	0	2	0	-		0	0	24	0
Tianjin Jinmen Tiger	2026	Chinese Super League	4	0	0	0	-		0	0	4	0
Tianjin Jinmen Tiger	Total		37	1	4	0	0	0	0	0	41	1
Career total			65	3	10	4	0	0	6	0	81	7
