= Ibrahim Sadeh =

Jordanian footballer (born 2000)

Personal information
- Full name: Ibrahim Mohammad Sami Sadeh
- Date of birth: 27 April 2000 (age 26)
- Place of birth: Zarqa, Jordan
- Height: 1.75 m (5 ft 9 in)
- Position: Midfielder

Team information
- Current team: Al-Karma
- Number: 15

Senior career*
Years	Team	Apps	(Gls)
2018–2022	Al-Jazeera		
2022–2023	Al-Hussein		
2023	Al-Zawraa		
2023–2024	Al-Khor	11	(1)
2024–2025	Al-Muharraq		
2025–	Al-Karma	33	(0)

International career^{‡}
2016	Jordan U16	3	(0)
2018	Jordan U19	5	(1)
2020–2022	Jordan U23	10	(1)
2021–	Jordan	45	(3)
Medal record
Representing Jordan
Men's football
FIFA Arab Cup
Runner-up	2025 Qatar	Team
- * Club domestic league appearances and goals as of 22:25, 10 June 2026 (UTC) ‡ National team caps and goals as of 9 December 2025

Ibrahim Mohammad Sami Sadeh (Arabic: إبراهيم سعادة; born 27 April 2000) is a Jordanian professional footballer who plays as a midfielder for Iraqi Stars League side Al-Karma and the Jordan national team.

== International career ==
Sadeh debuted for the Jordan national team in a 2–0 friendly win over Tajikistan on 1 February 2021.

In January 2024, Sadeh took part in the 2023 AFC Asian Cup with Jordan.

=== International goals ===
Scores and results list Jordan goal tally first.

No	Date	Venue	Opponent	Score	Result	Competition
1.	28 March 2023	Saoud bin Abdulrahman Stadium, Doha, Qatar	Philippines	4–0	4–0	Friendly
2.	6 June 2024	Amman International Stadium, Amman, Jordan	Tajikistan	3–0	3–0	2026 FIFA World Cup qualification
3.	9 September 2025	Amman International Stadium, Amman, Jordan	Dominican Republic	2–0	3–0	Friendly
