= Anas Bani Odeh =

Palestinian footballer (born 2001)

Personal information
- Full name: Anas Khairaldin Mohammed Bani Odeh
- Date of birth: 6 September 2001 (age 25)
- Place of birth: Jenin, Palestine
- Height: 1.85 m (6 ft 1 in)
- Position: Winger

Team information
- Current team: Al Mokawloon Al Arab
- Number: 7

Senior career*
Years	Team	Apps	(Gls)
–2021	Tubas		
2021–2022	Markaz Shabab Al-Am'ari		
2022–2024	Shabab Al-Dhahiriya		
2024	Al Ahli		
2024–2025	Al Akhdar		
2025–2026	Shabab Al-Ordon		
2026–	Al Mokawloon Al Arab	3	(1)

International career^{‡}
2022–2024	Palestine U23	13	(1)
2023	Palestine Olympic	3	
2026–	Palestine	2	(0)
- * Club domestic league appearances and goals as of 28 October 2026 ‡ National team caps and goals as of 17 November 2026

Anas Bani Odeh (Arabic: أنس بني عودة; born 6 September 2001) is a Palestinian footballer who plays as a winger for Egyptian Premier League club Al Mokawloon Al Arab and the Palestine national team.

== Club career ==
On 22 January 2024, Bani Odeh transferred to Al-Ahli Club of Amman.

On 15 July 2024, it was reported that he had signed a two-year contract with CS Constantine, becoming the first Palestinian player to turn professional in the Algerian Ligue Professionnelle 1. However, in late August the contract was terminated after he was assigned to train with the reserve team following a disagreement with head coach Kheireddine Madoui.

On 28 August 2024, Libyan club Al Akhdar announced the signing of Bani Odeh on a three-year contract.

On 5 July 2026, Bani Odeh signed a two-year contract with Al Mokawloon Al Arab.

== International career ==
He received a call-up to the senior national team for the friendly tournament in Basra, where he made his international debut in the match against Iran.

== Career statistics ==
=== Club ===
As of match played 19 November 2026

Appearances and goals by club, season and competition
Club	Season	League			Cup		League Cup		Total	
Club	Season	Division	Apps	Goals	Apps	Goals	Apps	Goals	Apps	Goals
Al Mokawloon Al Arab	2026–27	Premier League	3	1	2	0	2	0	7	1
Al Mokawloon Al Arab	Total		3	1	2	0	2	0	7	1
Career total			3	1	2	0	2	0	7	1

=== International ===
As of 17 November 2026

Appearances and goals by national team and year
National team	Year	Apps	Goals
Palestine	2026	2	0
Total		2	0
