= Abdulla Hamad =

Emirati association football player (born 2001)

Personal information
- Full name: Abdulla Hamad Mohammed Salmeen Al-Menhali
- Date of birth: 18 September 2001 (age 25)
- Place of birth: Abu Dhabi, United Arab Emirates
- Height: 1.78 m (5 ft 10 in)
- Position: Defensive midfielder

Team information
- Current team: Al-Wahda
- Number: 12

Youth career
- –2019: Al-Wahda

Senior career*
Years	Team	Apps	(Gls)
2019–	Al-Wahda	91	(5)

International career
2021–	United Arab Emirates	16	(0)
- * Club domestic league appearances and goals

Abdulla Hamad Al-Menhali (Arabic: عَبْدُ اللهِ حَمَدُ مُحَمَّدُ سَالِمِينُ الْمَنْهَالِي) (born 18 September 2001) is an Emirati footballer. He currently plays as a defensive midfielder for Al-Wahda and the United Arab Emirates national team.

== Club career ==
Abdulla Hamad started his career at Al-Wahda and is a product of the Al-Wahda's youth system. On 18 October 2019, he was suspended for 4 matches due to his absence from U20 UAE camp without prior excuse . On 16 December 2019, Abdulla Hamad made his professional debut for Al-Wahda against Khor Fakkan in the Pro League, replacing Yahya Al Ghassani .

== International career ==
On 4 January 2024, Hamad was named in the UAE's squad for the 2023 AFC Asian Cup.
