= Reebal Dahamshi =

Palestinian footballer

Reebal Dahamshi ريبال فهد عدل الدهامشة
Personal information
- Full name: Reebal Fahed Adel Dahamshi
- Date of birth: 8 June 2002 (age 24)
- Place of birth: Kafr Kanna, Israel
- Height: 1.87 m (6 ft 2 in)
- Position: Midfielder

Team information
- Current team: Tzeirei Umm al-Fahm
- Number: 15

Youth career
- 2011–2016: Beitar Tubruk
- 2016–2017: Tzeirei Kafr Kanna
- 2017–2020: Hapoel Nof HaGalil

Senior career*
Years	Team	Apps	(Gls)
2020–2021	Tzeirei Kafr Kanna	7	(4)
2021–2022	Hilal Al-Quds		
2022–2023	Hapoel Bnei Zalafa	40	(14)
2023–2025	Hapoel Ra'anana	39	(12)
2025–	Tzeirei Umm al-Fahm	17	(10)

International career^{‡}
2020–	Palestine	6	(0)
- * Club domestic league appearances and goals as of 15 June 2025 ‡ National team caps and goals as of 18:02, 8 June 2022 (UTC)

Reebal Fahed Adel Dahamshi (Arabic: ريبال فهد عدل الدهامشة, Hebrew: ריבאל פהד עדל דהאמשה; born 8 June 2002) is a professional footballer who plays as a forward for Tzeirei Umm al-Fahm. Born in Israel, he represents the Palestine national team.

== Career statistics ==
=== International ===
As of matches played 8 June 2022.

National team	Year	Apps	Goals
Palestine	2020	3	0
Palestine	2021	3	0
Total		6	0
