= 1968 AFC Youth Championship =

Tournament details
- Host country: South Korea
- Dates: 2–16 May
- Teams: 12

Final positions
- Champions: Burma (5th title)
- Runners-up: Malaysia

The 1968 AFC Youth Championship was held in Seoul, South Korea.

== Teams ==
The following teams entered the tournament:

- Burma
- Hong Kong
- India
- Israel
- Japan
- Malaysia
- Philippines
- Singapore
- South Vietnam
- South Korea (host)
- Taiwan
- Thailand

== First round ==
=== Group A ===
| Teams | Pld | W | D | L | GF | GA | GD | Pts |
|---|---|---|---|---|---|---|---|---|
| South Korea | 3 | 3 | 0 | 0 | 10 | 2 | +8 | 6 |
| Thailand | 3 | 1 | 1 | 1 | 6 | 5 | +1 | 3 |
| Hong Kong | 3 | 0 | 2 | 1 | 3 | 6 | –3 | 2 |
| Japan | 3 | 0 | 1 | 2 | 0 | 6 | –6 | 1 |

2 May 1968

| South Korea | 4–1 | Hong Kong |
|---|---|---|
| Kim Byung-chan 12'; Kim In-kwon 17'; Bae Ki-myeon 27'; ??? 61' (pen.) | Report | Kwok Ka Ming 45' |

Seoul
2 May 1968

| Thailand | 3–0 | Japan |
|---|---|---|
| | Report |

Seoul
4 May 1968

| Hong Kong | 2–2 | Thailand |
|---|---|---|
| | Report |

Seoul
5 May 1968

| Japan | 0–3 | South Korea |
|---|---|---|
| | Report | Kim In-kwon 46'; Lee Jong-han 72', 79' |

Dongdaemun Stadium, Seoul
Attendance: 40,000
7 May 1968

| Japan | 0–0 | Hong Kong |
|---|---|---|
| | Report |

Dongdaemun Stadium, Seoul
8 May 1968

| Thailand | 1–3 | South Korea |
|---|---|---|
| Uudeungsin 36' | Report | Jo Jae-deok 13'; Kim In-kwon 22'; Kim Byung-chan 61' |

Dongdaemun Stadium, Seoul

=== Group B ===
| Teams | Pld | W | D | L | GF | GA | GD | Pts |
|---|---|---|---|---|---|---|---|---|
| Burma | 3 | 3 | 0 | 0 | 14 | 0 | +14 | 6 |
| Philippines | 3 | 1 | 0 | 2 | 3 | 7 | –4 | 2 |
| Singapore | 3 | 1 | 0 | 2 | 4 | 9 | –5 | 2 |
| South Vietnam | 3 | 1 | 0 | 2 | 2 | 7 | –5 | 2 |

| 3 May | Philippines | 3–1 | Singapore |
| | Burma | 4–0 | South Vietnam |
| 5 May | South Vietnam | 1–0 | Philippines |
| | Burma | 5–0 | Singapore |
| 8 May | Burma | 5–0 | Philippines |
| | Singapore | 3–1 | South Vietnam |

=== Group C ===
| Teams | Pld | W | D | L | GF | GA | GD | Pts |
|---|---|---|---|---|---|---|---|---|
| Israel | 3 | 3 | 0 | 0 | 13 | 0 | +13 | 6 |
| Malaysia | 3 | 2 | 0 | 1 | 6 | 6 | 0 | 4 |
| India | 3 | 1 | 0 | 2 | 4 | 4 | 0 | 2 |
| Taiwan | 3 | 0 | 0 | 3 | 1 | 14 | –13 | 0 |

| 4 May | Malaysia | 2–1 | India |
| | Israel | 7–0 | Taiwan |
| 7 May | India | 3–0 | Taiwan |
| | Israel | 4–0 | Malaysia |
| 9 May | Israel | 2–0 | India |
| | Malaysia | 4–1 | Taiwan |

== Second round ==
=== Group 1 ===
| Teams | Pld | W | D | L | GF | GA | GD | Pts |
|---|---|---|---|---|---|---|---|---|
| Israel | 2 | 1 | 1 | 0 | 3 | 1 | +2 | 3 |
| Burma | 2 | 1 | 1 | 0 | 4 | 2 | +2 | 3 |
| Thailand | 2 | 0 | 0 | 2 | 1 | 5 | –4 | 0 |

| 11 May | Israel | 2–0 | Thailand |
| 12 May | Israel | 1–1 | Burma |
| 13 May | Burma | 3–1 | Thailand |

=== Group 2 ===
| Teams | Pld | W | D | L | GF | GA | GD | Pts |
|---|---|---|---|---|---|---|---|---|
| South Korea | 2 | 2 | 0 | 0 | 7 | 1 | +6 | 4 |
| Malaysia | 2 | 1 | 0 | 1 | 2 | 5 | –3 | 2 |
| Philippines | 2 | 0 | 0 | 2 | 2 | 5 | –3 | 0 |

| 11 May | South Korea | 3–1 | Philippines |
| 12 May | Malaysia | 2–1 | Philippines |
| 13 May | South Korea | 4–0 | Malaysia |

== Semifinals ==
15 May 1968

| South Korea | 1 – 1 Burma win coin toss | Burma |

Seoul
15 May 1968

| Israel | 0 – 1 | Malaysia |

Seoul

== Third place match ==
16 May 1968

| South Korea | 0 – 0 third place shared | Israel |

Seoul

== Final ==
16 May 1968

| Burma | 4 – 0 | Malaysia |

Seoul

1968 AFC Youth Championship

Burma
Fifth title
