= 2025 FIFA Arab Cup knockout stage =

Second stage of 2025 FIFA Arab Cup

The knockout stage of the 2025 FIFA Arab Cup was the second and final stage of the competition, following the group stage. It began on 11 December with the quarter-finals and ended on 18 December with the final match at the Lusail Stadium in Lusail. The top two teams from each group (8 in total) advanced to the knockout stage to compete in a single-elimination style tournament. A third place play-off was scheduled to be played between the two losing teams of the semi-finals.

All times are local, AST (UTC+3).

== Qualified teams ==
The top two highest-placing teams from each of the two groups advanced to the knockout stage.

Group	Winners	Runners-up
A	Palestine	Syria
B	Morocco	Saudi Arabia
C	Jordan	United Arab Emirates
D	Algeria	Iraq

== Bracket ==
Quarter-finals
11 December – Lusail
Palestine	1
Saudi Arabia (a.e.t.)	2
12 December – Al Rayyan (ECS)
Jordan	1
Iraq	0
11 December – Al Rayyan (KIS)
Morocco	1
Syria	0
12 December – Al Khor
Algeria	1 (6)
United Arab Emirates (p)	1 (7)

Semi-finals
15 December – Al Khor
Saudi Arabia	0
Jordan	1
15 December – Al Rayyan (KIS)
Morocco	3
United Arab Emirates	0

Final
18 December – Lusail
Jordan	2
Morocco (a.e.t.)	3
Third place play-off
18 December – Al Rayyan (KIS)
Saudi Arabia	—
United Arab Emirates	—

== Quarter-finals ==
=== Morocco vs Syria ===
11 December 2025
17:30

Morocco	1–0	Syria
Azaro 79'	Report

Khalifa International Stadium, Al Rayyan
Attendance: 39,167
Referee: Cristián Garay (Chile)

Morocco	Syria

GK	12	Mehdi Benabid
RB	7	Mohamed Boulacsoute
CB	4	Soufiane Bouftini
CB	18	Marwane Saâdane
LB	19	Hamza El Moussaoui		(substituted off) 67'
CM	13	Walid El Karti	(yellow card) 61'	(substituted off) 67'
CM	6	Mohamed Rabie Hrimat (c)
RW	21	Karim El Berkaoui		(substituted off) 87'
AM	14	Oussama Tannane	(yellow card) 23'	(substituted off) 74'
LW	10	Amin Zahzouh		(substituted off) 67'
CF	20	Tarik Tissoudali		(substituted off) 24'
Substitutions:
FW	11	Walid Azaro		(substituted on) 24'
DF	5	Mahmoud Bentayg		(substituted on) 67'
MF	16	Aschraf El Mahdioui		(substituted on) 67'
FW	17	Mounir Chouiar		(substituted on) 67'
MF	8	Sabir Bougrine		(substituted on) 74'
DF	2	Mohamed Moufid	(red card) 90+1'	(substituted on) 87'
Manager:
(Morocco) Tarik Sektioui

GK	1	Elias Hadaya
RB	19	Zakaria Hannan
CB	2	Ahmad Faqa
CB	13	Abdulrazzak Al Mohammad
LB	6	Khaled Kourdoghli
CM	16	Elmar Abraham		(substituted off) 82'
CM	8	Simon Amin	(yellow card) 54'	(substituted off) 60'
RW	17	Mohammad Alsalkhadi		(substituted off) 87'
AM	10	Mahmoud Al-Mawas (c)		(substituted off) 82'
LW	21	Mahmoud Al Aswad		(substituted off) 87'
CF	12	Antonio Yakoub		(substituted off) 82'
Substitutions:
MF	18	Mouhamad Anez		(substituted on) 60'
MF	15	Mahmoud Nayef		(substituted on) 82'
FW	9	Yassin Samia		(substituted on) 82'
FW	7	Omar Khribin	(yellow card) 90+7'	(substituted on) 82'
MF	14	Anas Dahan		(substituted on) 87'
MF	20	Hasan Dahan		(substituted on) 87'
Manager:
(Spain) José Lana

Man of the Match:
Walid Azaro (Morocco)

Assistant referees:
Claudio Urrutia (Chile)
José Retamal (Chile)
Fourth official:
Juan Gabriel Benítez (Paraguay)
Reserve assistant referee:
Eduardo Cardozo (Paraguay)
Video assistant referee:
Rodolpho Toski (Brazil)
Assistant video assistant referee:
Benjamín Pineda (Costa Rica)

=== Palestine vs Saudi Arabia ===
11 December 2025
20:30

Palestine	1–2 (a.e.t.)	Saudi Arabia
Dabbagh 64'	Report	Al-Buraikan 58' (pen.); Kanno 115'

Lusail Stadium, Lusail
Attendance: 77,197
Referee: Amin Omar (Egypt)

Palestine	Saudi Arabia

GK	22	Rami Hamadeh
RB	7	Musab Al-Battat (c)
CB	15	Michel Termanini
CB	3	Mohammed Saleh
LB	2	Wajdi Nabhan		(substituted off) 91'
RM	5	Ameed Sawafta	(yellow card) 90+5'
CM	20	Ameed Mahajna	(yellow card) 98'	(substituted off) 100'
CM	8	Hamed Hamdan	(yellow card) 25'	(substituted off) 82'
LM	9	Tamer Seyam		(substituted off) 60'
CF	11	Oday Dabbagh
CF	21	Zaid Qunbar		(substituted off) 112'
Substitutions:
FW	18	Ahmad Al-Qaq		(substituted on) 60'
MF	6	Oday Kharoub		(substituted on) 82'
DF	14	Ahmed Taha		(substituted on) 91'
DF	12	Khalid Abu El Haija		(substituted on) 100'
FW	19	Khaled Al-Nabris		(substituted on) 112'
Manager:
Ihab Abu Jazar			(yellow card) 67'

GK	1	Nawaf Al-Aqidi
RB	2	Ali Majrashi	(yellow card) 78'
CB	5	Hassan Al-Tombakti
CB	14	Waleed Al-Ahmed
LB	13	Nawaf Boushal
DM	15	Abdullah Al-Khaibari		(substituted off) 106'
CM	23	Mohamed Kanno
CM	6	Nasser Al-Dawsari		(substituted off) 78'
RF	18	Saleh Abu Al-Shamat		(substituted off) 67'
CF	9	Firas Al-Buraikan	(yellow card) 89'	(substituted off) 110'
LF	10	Salem Al-Dawsari (c)
Substitutions:
FW	20	Abdulrahman Al-Aboud		(substituted on) 67' (substituted off) 118'
MF	7	Musab Al-Juwayr		(substituted on) 78'
MF	16	Murad Hawsawi		(substituted on) 106'
FW	11	Saleh Al-Shehri		(substituted on) 110'
DF	4	Abdulelah Al-Amri		(substituted on) 118'
Manager:
(France) Hervé Renard

Man of the Match:
Mohamed Kanno (Saudi Arabia)

Assistant referees:
Mahmoud Abouregal (Egypt)
Ahmed Ali (Egypt)
Fourth official:
Campbell-Kirk Kawana-Waugh (New Zealand)
Reserve assistant referee:
Isaac Trevis (New Zealand)
Video assistant referee:
Jarred Gillett (England)
Assistant video assistant referee:
Sivakorn Pu-udom (Thailand)

=== Jordan vs Iraq ===
12 December 2025
17:30

Jordan	1–0	Iraq
Olwan 41' (pen.)	Report

Education City Stadium, Al Rayyan
Attendance: 43,486
Referee: Espen Eskås (Norway)

Jordan	Iraq

GK	1	Yazeed Abulaila
CB	3	Abdallah Nasib
CB	19	Saed Al-Rosan
CB	4	Husam Abu Dahab	(yellow card) 54'	(substituted off) 83'
RWB	23	Adham Al-Quraishi
LWB	20	Mohannad Abu Taha
RM	9	Ali Olwan
CM	21	Nizar Al-Rashdan
CM	6	Amer Jamous
LM	13	Mahmoud Al-Mardi (c)		(substituted off) 65'
CF	11	Yazan Al-Naimat		(substituted off) 15'
Substitutions:
FW	8	Odeh Al-Fakhouri		(substituted on) 15'
MF	14	Rajaei Ayed		(substituted on) 65'
DF	16	Ali Hajabi		(substituted on) 83'
Manager:
(Morocco) Jamal Sellami

GK	22	Ahmed Basil
RB	3	Mustafa Saadoon
CB	6	Munaf Younis
CB	5	Akam Hashim
LB	15	Ahmed Yahya
CM	19	Karrar Nabeel
CM	20	Zaid Ismail
RW	17	Ali Jasim
AM	8	Amjad Attwan (c)	(substituted off) 63'
LW	23	Ahmed Maknzi	(substituted off) 58'
CF	10	Mohanad Ali
Substitutions:
MF	11	Hasan Abdulkareem	(substituted on) 58'
FW	9	Mohammed Jawad	(substituted on) 63'
Manager:
(Australia) Graham Arnold

Man of the Match:
Yazeed Abulaila (Jordan)

Assistant referees:
Jan Erik Engan (Norway)
Isaak Bashevkin (Norway)
Fourth official:
Pierre Atcho (Gabon)
Reserve assistant referee:
Boris Ditsoga (Gabon)
Video assistant referee:
Dennis Higler (Netherlands)
Assistant video assistant referee:
Khamis Al-Marri (Qatar)

=== Algeria vs United Arab Emirates ===
12 December 2025
20:30

Algeria	1–1 (a.e.t.)	United Arab Emirates
Boulbina 46'	Report	Bruno 64'
Penalties
Brahimi (penalty scored); Benzia (penalty missed); Mrezigue (penalty scored); Ounas (penalty scored); Boulbina (penalty scored); Halaïmia (penalty scored); Draoui (penalty scored); Khacef (penalty missed)	6–7	(penalty scored) Caio; (penalty missed) Meloni; (penalty scored) Saleh; (penalty scored) Pimenta; (penalty scored) Faiz; (penalty scored) Adil; (penalty scored) Autonne; (penalty scored) Akonnor

Al Bayt Stadium, Al Khor
Attendance: 50,424
Referee: Adham Makhadmeh (Jordan)

Algeria	United Arab Emirates

GK	1	Farid Chaâl
RB	12	Réda Halaïmia
CB	19	Achref Abada
CB	5	Abdelkader Bedrane		(substituted off) 84'
LB	2	Houari Baouche		(substituted off) 106'
DM	6	Victor Lekhal	(yellow card) 10'	(substituted off) 106'
CM	14	Sofiane Bendebka		(substituted off) 74'
CM	10	Yassine Benzia
RF	7	Adil Boulbina
CF	18	Redouane Berkane		(substituted off) 106'
LF	11	Yacine Brahimi (c)
Substitutions:
MF	8	Zakaria Draoui	(yellow card) 100'	(substituted on) 74'
DF	4	Mohamed Amine Tougai		(substituted on) 84'
DF	3	Naoufel Khacef		(substituted on) 106'
FW	9	Adam Ounas	(yellow card) 90+3'	(substituted on) 106'
MF	15	Houssem Eddine Mrezigue		(substituted on) 106'
Manager:
Madjid Bougherra

GK	22	Hamad Al-Meqebaali
RB	16	Marcus Meloni	(yellow card) 34'
CB	3	Lucas Pimenta	(yellow card) 13'
CB	6	Saša Ivković		(substituted off) 115'
LB	2	Rúben Canedo
CM	18	Majid Rashid		(substituted off) 73'
CM	15	Yahia Nader (c)		(substituted off) 46'
RW	11	Bruno		(substituted off) 73'
AM	14	Nicolás Giménez		(substituted off) 111'
LW	20	Yahya Al-Ghassani		(substituted off) 93'
CF	10	Caio Lucas	(yellow card) 120'
Substitutions:
MF	12	Isam Faiz		(substituted on) 46'
DF	19	Khaled Ibrahim		(substituted on) 73'
MF	7	Ali Saleh		(substituted on) 73'
DF	8	Richard Akonnor		(substituted on) 93'
FW	23	Sultan Adil		(substituted on) 111'
DF	4	Kouame Autonne		(substituted on) 115'
Manager:
(Romania) Cosmin Olăroiu

Man of the Match:
Hamad Al-Meqebaali (United Arab Emirates)

Assistant referees:
Mohammad Al-Kalaf (Jordan)
Ahmad Al-Roalle (Jordan)
Fourth official:
Juan Gabriel Calderón (Costa Rica)
Reserve assistant referee:
Juan Carlos Mora (Costa Rica)
Video assistant referee:
Allen Chapman (United States)
Assistant video assistant referee:
Abdullah Al-Shehri (Saudi Arabia)

== Semi-finals ==
=== Morocco vs United Arab Emirates ===
15 December 2025
17:30

Morocco	3–0	United Arab Emirates
El Berkaoui 28'; El Mahdioui 83'; Hamdallah 90+2'	Report

Khalifa International Stadium, Al Rayyan
Attendance: 33,898
Referee: Espen Eskås (Norway)

Morocco	United Arab Emirates

GK	12	Mehdi Benabid
RB	7	Mohamed Boulacsoute	(yellow card) 81'
CB	4	Soufiane Bouftini
CB	18	Marwane Saâdane	(yellow card) 38'
LB	19	Hamza El Moussaoui
CM	3	Anas Bach		(substituted off) 74'
CM	6	Mohamed Rabie Hrimat (c)
RW	21	Karim El Berkaoui		(substituted off) 82'
AM	14	Oussama Tannane		(substituted off) 82'
LW	10	Amin Zahzouh		(substituted off) 74'
CF	11	Walid Azaro		(substituted off) 74'
Substitutions:
FW	9	Abderrazak Hamdallah	(yellow card) 90+2'	(substituted on) 74'
MF	16	Aschraf El Mahdioui		(substituted on) 74'
DF	5	Mahmoud Bentayg		(substituted on) 74'
MF	13	Walid El Karti		(substituted on) 82'
DF	15	Marouane Louadni		(substituted on) 86'
Manager:
(Morocco) Tarik Sektioui

GK	22	Hamad Al-Meqebaali
RB	19	Khaled Ibrahim	(substituted off) 71'
CB	3	Lucas Pimenta
CB	6	Saša Ivković
LB	2	Rúben Canedo
CM	18	Majid Rashid	(substituted off) 63'
CM	12	Isam Faiz	(substituted off) 88'
RW	11	Bruno	(substituted off) 71'
AM	4	Kouame Autonne
LW	20	Yahya Al-Ghassani (c)	(substituted off) 88'
CF	10	Caio Lucas
Substitutions:
MF	7	Ali Saleh	(substituted on) 63'
FW	23	Sultan Adil	(substituted on) 71'
DF	8	Richard Akonnor	(substituted on) 71'
FW	13	Mohammed Juma	(substituted on) 88'
MF	15	Yahia Nader	(substituted on) 88'
Manager:
(Romania) Cosmin Olăroiu

Man of the Match:
Hamza El Moussaoui (Morocco)

Assistant referees:
Jan Erik Engan (Norway)
Isaak Bashevkin (Norway)
Fourth official:
Ma Ning (China)
Reserve assistant referee:
Zhou Fei (China)
Video assistant referee:
Jarred Gillett (Australia)
Assistant video assistant referee:
Benjamín Pineda (Costa Rica)

=== Saudi Arabia vs Jordan ===
15 December 2025
20:30

Saudi Arabia	0–1	Jordan
	Report	Al-Rashdan 66'

Al Bayt Stadium, Al Khor
Attendance: 62,825
Referee: Juan Gabriel Benítez (Paraguay)

Saudi Arabia	Jordan

GK	1	Nawaf Al-Aqidi
RB	2	Ali Majrashi
CB	5	Hassan Al-Tombakti
CB	14	Waleed Al-Ahmed	(red card) 90+6'
LB	13	Nawaf Boushal		(substituted off) 82'
DM	15	Abdullah Al-Khaibari	(yellow card) 34'	(substituted off) 72'
CM	23	Mohamed Kanno
CM	6	Nasser Al-Dawsari
RF	18	Saleh Abu Al-Shamat		(substituted off) 46'
CF	9	Firas Al-Buraikan		(substituted off) 82'
LF	10	Salem Al-Dawsari (c)		(substituted off) 64'
Substitutions:
FW	20	Abdulrahman Al-Aboud		(substituted on) 46'
MF	7	Musab Al-Juwayr		(substituted on) 64'
FW	19	Abdullah Al-Hamdan		(substituted on) 72'
MF	12	Mohammed Abu Al-Shamat		(substituted on) 82'
FW	11	Saleh Al-Shehri		(substituted on) 82'
Manager:
(France) Hervé Renard

GK	1	Yazeed Abulaila
CB	3	Abdallah Nasib
CB	19	Saed Al-Rosan
CB	4	Husam Abu Dahab
RWB	17	Issam Smeeri
LWB	20	Mohannad Abu Taha		(substituted off) 85'
CM	21	Nizar Al-Rashdan
CM	14	Rajaei Ayed	(yellow card) 90+7'
RF	9	Ali Olwan
CF	13	Mahmoud Al-Mardi (c)		(substituted off) 72'
LF	10	Ahmad Ersan		(substituted off) 46'
Substitutions:
FW	7	Mohammad Abu Zrayq		(substituted on) 46' (substituted off) 85'
MF	2	Mohammad Abu Hashish		(substituted on) 72'
DF	16	Ali Hajabi		(substituted on) 85'
MF	6	Amer Jamous		(substituted on) 85'
Manager:
(Morocco) Jamal Sellami

Man of the Match:
Yazeed Abulaila (Jordan)

Assistant referees:
Eduardo Cardozo (Paraguay)
Milcíades Saldívar (Paraguay)
Fourth official:
Cristián Garay (Chile)
Reserve assistant referee:
Claudio Urrutia (Chile)
Video assistant referee:
Antonio García Noni (Uruguay)
Assistant video assistant referee:
Dennis Higler (Netherlands)

== Third place play-off ==
18 December 2025
14:00

Saudi Arabia	0–0 Abandoned (Note: After the first half ended 0–0, the match was abandoned before the resumption of the second half, following a decision of the referee, due to uncertain adverse weather conditions and the associated player welfare considerations. Later that day, FIFA declared the match a 0–0 draw and announced Saudi Arabia and the United Arab Emirates as joint third-place winners.)	United Arab Emirates
	Report

Khalifa International Stadium, Al Rayyan
Attendance: 32,768
Referee: Cristián Garay (Chile)

Saudi Arabia	United Arab Emirates

GK	22	Raghed Al-Najjar
RB	12	Mohammed Abu Al-Shamat
CB	4	Abdulelah Al-Amri
CB	17	Mohammed Sulaiman
LB	13	Nawaf Boushal
RM	9	Firas Al-Buraikan
CM	7	Musab Al-Juwayr
CM	6	Nasser Al-Dawsari	(substituted off) 46'
LM	10	Salem Al-Dawsari (c)
CF	11	Saleh Al-Shehri
CF	19	Abdullah Al-Hamdan
Substitutions:
MF	15	Abdullah Al-Khaibari	(substituted on) 46'
Manager:
(France) Hervé Renard

GK	22	Hamad Al-Meqebaali
RB	16	Marcus Meloni
CB	3	Lucas Pimenta
CB	6	Saša Ivković
LB	2	Rúben Canedo
CM	12	Isam Faiz
CM	15	Yahia Nader	(substituted off) 46'
RW	20	Yahya Al-Ghassani
AM	11	Bruno
LW	7	Ali Saleh (c)
CF	23	Sultan Adil
Substitutions:
MF	14	Nicolás Giménez	(substituted on) 46'
Manager:
(Romania) Cosmin Olăroiu

Man of the Match:
Raghed Al-Najjar (Saudi Arabia)

Assistant referees:
Claudio Urrutia (Chile)
José Retamal (Chile)
Fourth official:
Pierre Atcho (Gabon)
Reserve assistant referee:
Boris Ditsoga (Gabon)
Video assistant referee:
Rodolpho Toski (Brazil)
Assistant video assistant referee:
Benjamín Pineda (Costa Rica)
Support video assistant referee:
Sivakorn Pu-udom (Thailand)

== Final ==
18 December 2025
19:00

Jordan	2–3 (a.e.t.)	Morocco
Olwan 48', 68' (pen.)	Report	Tannane 4'; Hamdallah 88', 100'

Lusail Stadium, Lusail
Attendance: 84,517
Referee: Glenn Nyberg (Sweden)

Jordan	Morocco

GK	1	Yazeed Abulaila
CB	3	Abdallah Nasib
CB	19	Saed Al-Rosan
CB	4	Husam Abu Dahab	(yellow card) 77'	(substituted off) 104'
RM	17	Issam Smeeri		(substituted off) 46'
CM	21	Nizar Al-Rashdan
CM	6	Amer Jamous		(substituted off) 81'
LM	20	Mohannad Abu Taha
RF	7	Mohammad Abu Zrayq		(substituted off) 46'
CF	9	Ali Olwan
LF	13	Mahmoud Al-Mardi (c)		(substituted off) 90'
Substitutions:
MF	23	Adham Al-Quraishi		(substituted on) 46'
FW	8	Odeh Al-Fakhouri		(substituted on) 46' (substituted off) 112'
MF	14	Rajaei Ayed	(yellow card) 119'	(substituted on) 81'
DF	2	Mohammad Abu Hashish		(substituted on) 90'
DF	16	Ali Hajabi		(substituted on) 104'
FW	10	Ahmad Ersan		(substituted on) 112'
Manager:
(Morocco) Jamal Sellami

GK	12	Mehdi Benabid
RB	7	Mohamed Boulacsoute
CB	4	Soufiane Bouftini		(substituted off) 71'
CB	18	Marwane Saâdane
LB	19	Hamza El Moussaoui		(substituted off) 80'
DM	6	Mohamed Rabie Hrimat (c)
DM	3	Anas Bach		(substituted off) 71'
AM	10	Amin Zahzouh	(yellow card) 113'
AM	14	Oussama Tannane		(substituted off) 71'
CF	11	Walid Azaro		(substituted off) 106'
CF	21	Karim El Berkaoui		(substituted off) 17'
Substitutions:
MF	16	Aschraf El Mahdioui		(substituted on) 17'
MF	8	Sabir Bougrine		(substituted on) 71'
FW	9	Abderrazak Hamdallah		(substituted on) 71'
FW	17	Mounir Chouiar		(substituted on) 71'
DF	5	Mahmoud Bentayg		(substituted on) 80'
DF	15	Marouane Louadni	(yellow card) 87'	(substituted on) 106'
Manager:
Tarik Sektioui

Man of the Match:
Abderrazak Hamdallah (Morocco)

Assistant referees:
Mahbod Beigi (Sweden)
Andreas Söderkvist (Sweden)
Fourth official:
Ma Ning (China)
Reserve assistant referee:
Zhou Fei (China)
Video assistant referee:
Fedayi San (Switzerland)
Assistant video assistant referee:
Khamis Al-Marri (Qatar)
Support video assistant referee:
Abdullah Al-Shehri (Saudi Arabia)
