= 2025 FIFA Arab Cup Group C =

Association football tournament group stage

The Group C of the 2025 FIFA Arab Cup was one of the four groups of competing nations in the 2025 FIFA Arab Cup, taking place from 2 December to 9 December 2025. It consisted of Egypt, Jordan, the United Arab Emirates and Kuwait.

The top two teams, Jordan and the United Arab Emirates, advanced to the quarter-finals.

== Teams ==
Draw position	Team	Finals appearance	Last appearance	Previous best performance	FIFA Rankings	
Draw position	Team	Finals appearance	Last appearance	Previous best performance	April 2025 (Note: The rankings of April 2025 were used for seeding for the final draw.)	November 2025
C1	Egypt	4th	2021	Winners (1992)	32	34
C2	Jordan	10th	2021	Fourth place (1988)	62	66
C3	United Arab Emirates	3rd	2021	Fourth place (1998)	65	67
C4	Kuwait	9th	2012	Third place (1964, 1992, 1998)	134	135

== Standings ==
Pos	Team	Pld	W	D	L	GF	GA	GD	Pts	Qualification
1	Jordan	3	3	0	0	8	2	+6	9	Advance to knockout stage
2	United Arab Emirates	3	1	1	1	5	4	+1	4	Advance to knockout stage
3	Egypt	3	0	2	1	2	5	−3	2	
4	Kuwait	3	0	1	2	3	7	−4	1	

Source: FIFA
Rules for classification: Tiebreakers

In the quarter-finals:

- The winners of Group C, Jordan, advanced to play the runners-up of Group D, Iraq.
- The runners-up of Group C, the United Arab Emirates, advanced to play the winners of Group D, Algeria.

== Matches ==
=== Egypt vs Kuwait ===
2 December 2025
17:30

Egypt	1–1	Kuwait
Afsha 88' (pen.)	Report	Al Hajeri 64'

Lusail Stadium, Lusail
Attendance: 24,632
Referee: Espen Eskås (Norway)

Egypt	Kuwait

GK	23	Mohamed Bassam
RB	12	Akram Tawfik
CB	5	Ragab Nabil
CB	3	Yassin Marei
LB	21	Yehia Zakaria		(substituted off) 72'
DM	19	Ghanam Mohamed	(yellow card) 40'
CM	14	Amr El Solia (c)
CM	17	Mohamed Elneny		(substituted off) 61'
RF	20	Mostafa Saad		(substituted off) 72'
CF	10	Mohamed Sherif		(substituted off) 61'
LF	8	Islam Issa
Substitutions:
MF	22	Mohamed Magdy		(substituted on) 61'
FW	18	Marwan Hamdy		(substituted on) 61'
DF	7	Karim Fouad		(substituted on) 72'
MF	11	Mido Gaber		(substituted on) 72'
Manager:
Helmy Toulan

GK	23	Saud Al-Hoshan	(yellow card) 77' (yellow-red card) 83'
RB	12	Abdulwahab Al-Awadi	(yellow card) 51'	(substituted off) 57'
CB	5	Fahad Al Hajeri
CB	13	Khaled Al-Fadhli
LB	3	Muath Al-Dhefiri		(substituted off) 70'
DM	6	Sultan Al Enezi
CM	8	Ahmed Al-Dhefiri
CM	10	Fawaz Ayedh		(substituted off) 57'
RF	15	Yousef Majed		(substituted off) 57'
CF	20	Yousef Nasser (c)		(substituted off) 85'
LF	7	Mohammad Daham	(yellow card) 89'
Substitutions:
MF	9	Naser Faleh Jazea		(substituted on) 57'
FW	11	Eid Al-Rashidi		(substituted on) 57'
DF	4	Rashed Al-Dousari		(substituted on) 57'
DF	16	Mohammad Al-Sharifi		(substituted on) 70'
GK	22	Sulaiman Abdulghafour		(substituted on) 85'
Manager:
(Portugal) Hélio Sousa

Player of the Match:
Mohamed Magdy (Egypt)

Assistant referees:
Jan Erik Engan (Norway)
Isaak Bashevkin (Norway)
Fourth official:
Ismail Elfath (United States)
Reserve assistant referee:
Corey Parker (United States)
Video assistant referee:
Dennis Higler (Netherlands)
Assistant video assistant referee:
Antonio García Noni (Uruguay)

=== Jordan vs United Arab Emirates ===
3 December 2025
20:00

Jordan	2–1	United Arab Emirates
Olwan 20' (pen.); Al-Naimat 63'	Report	Bruno 47'

Al Bayt Stadium, Al Khor
Attendance: 30,759
Referee: Ahmed Al-Kaf (Oman)

Jordan	United Arab Emirates

GK	1	Yazeed Abulaila (c)
CB	3	Abdallah Nasib
CB	19	Saed Al-Rosan
CB	18	Salim Obaid		(substituted off) 52'
RWB	23	Adham Al-Quraishi
LWB	20	Mohannad Abu Taha
RM	9	Ali Olwan
CM	21	Nizar Al-Rashdan		(substituted off) 88'
CM	15	Ibrahim Sadeh		(substituted off) 52'
LM	10	Ahmad Ersan		(substituted off) 68'
CF	11	Yazan Al-Naimat		(substituted off) 88'
Substitutions:
DF	4	Husam Abu Dahab		(substituted on) 52'
MF	6	Amer Jamous	(yellow card) 89'	(substituted on) 52'
FW	13	Mahmoud Al-Mardi		(substituted on) 68'
MF	14	Rajaei Ayed		(substituted on) 88'
FW	8	Odeh Al-Fakhouri		(substituted on) 88'
Manager:
(Morocco) Jamal Sellami

GK	22	Hamad Al-Meqbaali	(yellow card) 38'
RB	19	Khaled Ibrahim	(red card) 18'
CB	3	Lucas Pimenta
CB	4	Kouame Autonne		(substituted off) 85'
LB	2	Rúben Canedo
CM	16	Marcus Meloni		(substituted off) 85'
CM	15	Yahia Nader (c)		(substituted off) 85'
RW	11	Bruno		(substituted off) 72'
AM	14	Nicolás Giménez
LW	21	Luanzinho		(substituted off) 72'
CF	10	Caio Lucas
Substitutions:
MF	9	Harib Abdalla		(substituted on) 72'
MF	20	Yahya Al-Ghassani	(yellow card) 90'	(substituted on) 72'
MF	12	Isam Faiz		(substituted on) 85'
DF	6	Saša Ivković		(substituted on) 85'
MF	7	Ali Saleh		(substituted on) 85'
Manager:
(Romania) Cosmin Olăroiu

Player of the Match:
Yazan Al-Naimat (Jordan)

Assistant referees:
Abu Bakr Al-Amri (Oman)
Rashid Al-Ghaiti (Oman)
Fourth official:
Campbell-Kirk Kawana-Waugh (New Zealand)
Reserve assistant referee:
Edward Cook (New Zealand)
Video assistant referee:
Lahlou Benbraham (Algeria)
Assistant video assistant referee:
Jarred Gillett (England)

=== Kuwait vs Jordan ===
6 December 2025
14:00

Kuwait	1–3	Jordan
Nasser 84'	Report	Abu Taha 17'; Al-Rosan 49'; Olwan 90+7' (pen.)

Ahmad bin Ali Stadium, Al Rayyan
Attendance: 35,933
Referee: Cristián Garay (Chile)

Kuwait	Jordan

GK	22	Sulaiman Abdulghafour (c)	(yellow card) 90+5'
RB	4	Rashed Al-Dousari
CB	2	Hassan Al-Enezi
CB	21	Nasser Khader	(yellow card) 5'	(substituted off) 57'
LB	16	Mohammad Al-Sharifi		(substituted off) 57'
DM	14	Redha Abujabrah
CM	9	Naser Faleh Jazea		(substituted off) 46'
CM	18	Athbi Shehab
RF	11	Eid Al-Rashidi
CF	17	Shabaib Al-Khaldi		(substituted off) 77'
LF	19	Muath Al-Enezi		(substituted off) 46'
Substitutions:
MF	8	Ahmed Al-Dhefiri		(substituted on) 46'
FW	7	Mohammad Daham		(substituted on) 46'
DF	5	Fahad Al Hajeri		(substituted on) 57'
DF	3	Muath Al-Dhefiri		(substituted on) 57'
FW	20	Yousef Nasser		(substituted on) 77'
Manager:
(Portugal) Hélio Sousa

GK	1	Yazeed Abulaila
CB	3	Abdallah Nasib
CB	19	Saed Al-Rosan
CB	4	Husam Abu Dahab	(substituted off) 90+3'
RWB	23	Adham Al-Quraishi
LWB	20	Mohannad Abu Taha
RM	9	Ali Olwan
CM	6	Amer Jamous
CM	21	Nizar Al-Rashdan	(substituted off) 68'
LM	13	Mahmoud Al-Mardi (c)	(substituted off) 68'
CF	11	Yazan Al-Naimat	(substituted off) 79'
Substitutions:
MF	15	Ibrahim Sadeh	(substituted on) 68'
FW	8	Odeh Al-Fakhouri	(substituted on) 68'
MF	14	Rajaei Ayed	(substituted on) 79'
DF	16	Ali Hajabi	(substituted on) 90+3'
Manager:
(Morocco) Jamal Sellami

Player of the Match:
Ali Olwan (Jordan)

Assistant referees:
Claudio Urrutia (Chile)
José Retamal (Chile)
Fourth official:
Pierre Atcho (Gabon)
Reserve assistant referee:
Boris Ditsoga (Gabon)
Video assistant referee:
Antonio García Noni (Uruguay)
Assistant video assistant referee:
Dennis Higler (Netherlands)

=== United Arab Emirates vs Egypt ===
6 December 2025
21:30

United Arab Emirates	1–1	Egypt
Caio 60'	Report	Hamdy 85'

Lusail Stadium, Lusail
Attendance: 36,299
Referee: Glenn Nyberg (Sweden)

United Arab Emirates	Egypt

GK	22	Hamad Al-Meqbaali
RB	5	Ala Zhir		(substituted off) 31'
CB	3	Lucas Pimenta
CB	6	Saša Ivković
LB	2	Rúben Canedo
CM	16	Marcus Meloni	(yellow card) 55'
CM	15	Yahia Nader (c)	(yellow card) 84'
RW	20	Yahya Al-Ghassani		(substituted off) 63'
AM	14	Nicolás Giménez		(substituted off) 87'
LW	21	Luanzinho		(substituted off) 31'
CF	11	Bruno		(substituted off) 63'
Substitutions:
MF	18	Majid Rashid	(yellow card) 45+4'	(substituted on) 31'
FW	10	Caio Lucas		(substituted on) 31'
MF	9	Harib Abdalla		(substituted on) 63'
MF	7	Ali Saleh		(substituted on) 63'
FW	23	Sultan Adil		(substituted on) 87'
Manager:
(Romania) Cosmin Olăroiu

GK	23	Mohamed Bassam
RB	12	Akram Tawfik
CB	5	Ragab Nabil
CB	3	Yassin Marei
LB	21	Yehia Zakaria		(substituted off) 81'
DM	19	Ghanam Mohamed
CM	14	Amr El Solia (c)		(substituted off) 69'
CM	17	Mohamed Elneny		(substituted off) 69'
RF	20	Mostafa Saad		(substituted off) 52'
CF	18	Marwan Hamdy
LF	8	Islam Issa	(yellow card) 42'
Substitutions:
MF	11	Mido Gaber	(yellow card) 90+5'	(substituted on) 52'
MF	22	Mohamed Magdy		(substituted on) 69'
DF	4	Karim El Eraki	(yellow card) 77'	(substituted on) 69'
FW	9	Hossam Hassan		(substituted on) 81'
Manager:
Helmy Toulan

Player of the Match:
Marwan Hamdy (Egypt)

Assistant referees:
Mahbod Beigi (Sweden)
Andreas Söderkvist (Sweden)
Fourth official:
Mario Escobar (Guatemala)
Reserve assistant referee:
Humberto Panjoj (Guatemala)
Video assistant referee:
Fedayi San (Switzerland)
Assistant video assistant referee:
Rodolpho Toski (Brazil)

=== Egypt vs Jordan ===
9 December 2025
17:30

Egypt	0–3	Jordan
	Report	Abu Hashish 19'; Abu Zrayq 41'; Olwan 90+2' (pen.)

Al Bayt Stadium, Al Khor
Attendance: 55,658
Referee: Ismail Elfath (United States)

Egypt	Jordan

GK	23	Mohamed Bassam
RB	4	Karim El Eraki	(yellow card) 59'	(substituted off) 82'
CB	15	Mahmoud Hamdy (c)
CB	3	Yassin Marei	(yellow card) 90'
LB	21	Yehia Zakaria		(substituted off) 57'
CM	12	Akram Tawfik
CM	19	Ghanam Mohamed	(yellow card) 38'	(substituted off) 46'
RW	11	Mido Gaber		(substituted off) 68'
AM	22	Mohamed Magdy		(substituted off) 46'
LW	8	Islam Issa
CF	18	Marwan Hamdy
Substitutions:
MF	17	Mohamed Elneny	(yellow card) 84'	(substituted on) 46'
FW	9	Hossam Hassan		(substituted on) 46'
DF	2	Ahmed Hany		(substituted on) 57'
MF	20	Mostafa Saad		(substituted on) 68'
FW	10	Mohamed Sherif		(substituted on) 82'
Manager:
Helmy Toulan

GK	22	Nour Bani Attiah
CB	5	Hadi Al-Hourani	(substituted off) 63'
CB	18	Salim Obaid	(substituted off) 58'
CB	16	Ali Hajabi	(substituted off) 71'
RWB	17	Issam Smeeri
LWB	2	Mohammad Abu Hashish	(substituted off) 46'
RM	7	Mohammad Abu Zrayq	(substituted off) 83'
CM	14	Rajaei Ayed (c)
CM	15	Ibrahim Sadeh
LM	10	Ahmad Ersan	(substituted off) 63'
CF	8	Odeh Al-Fakhouri
Substitutions:
DF	20	Mohannad Abu Taha	(substituted on) 46'
DF	19	Saed Al-Rosan	(substituted on) 58'
DF	3	Abdallah Nasib	(substituted on) 63'
FW	13	Mahmoud Al-Mardi	(substituted on) 63'
DF	4	Husam Abu Dahab	(substituted on) 71'
FW	9	Ali Olwan	(substituted on) 83'
Manager:
(Morocco) Jamal Sellami

Player of the Match:
Mohammad Abu Zrayq (Jordan)

Assistant referees:
Corey Parker (United States)
Kyle Atkins (United States)
Fourth official:
Campbell-Kirk Kawana-Waugh (New Zealand)
Reserve assistant referee:
Edward Cook (New Zealand)
Video assistant referee:
Allen Chapman (United States)
Assistant video assistant referee:
Abdullah Al-Shehri (Saudi Arabia)

=== United Arab Emirates vs Kuwait ===
9 December 2025
17:30

United Arab Emirates	3–1	Kuwait
Al-Ghassani 16' (pen.), 18'; Giménez 66'	Report	Al-Hajeri 59'

Stadium 974, Doha
Attendance: 15,357
Referee: Ma Ning (China)

United Arab Emirates	Kuwait

GK	22	Hamad Al-Meqbaali
RB	16	Marcus Meloni
CB	3	Lucas Pimenta
CB	6	Saša Ivković
LB	2	Rúben Canedo	(substituted off) 89'
CM	18	Majid Rashid
CM	14	Nicolás Giménez	(substituted off) 79'
RW	20	Yahya Al-Ghassani	(substituted off) 79'
AM	11	Bruno	(substituted off) 68'
LW	7	Ali Saleh (c)
CF	10	Caio Lucas	(substituted off) 89'
Substitutions:
MF	15	Yahia Nader	(substituted on) 68'
FW	23	Sultan Adil	(substituted on) 79'
DF	8	Richard Akonnor	(substituted on) 79'
FW	13	Mohammed Juma	(substituted on) 89'
MF	12	Isam Faiz	(substituted on) 89'
Manager:
(Romania) Cosmin Olăroiu

GK	1	Khaled Al-Rashidi (c)
RB	12	Abdulwahab Al-Awadi
CB	5	Fahad Al Hajeri	(yellow card) 26'
CB	13	Khaled Al-Fadhli		(substituted off) 50'
LB	3	Muath Al-Dhefiri
DM	6	Sultan Al Enezi	(red card) 55'
CM	8	Ahmed Al-Dhefiri		(substituted off) 85'
CM	10	Fawaz Ayedh	(yellow card) 8'	(substituted off) 59'
RF	15	Yousef Majed		(substituted off) 59'
CF	20	Yousef Nasser		(substituted off) 85'
LF	7	Mohammad Daham
Substitutions:
DF	2	Hassan Al-Enezi		(substituted on) 50'
FW	11	Eid Al-Rashidi		(substituted on) 59'
MF	9	Naser Faleh Jazea		(substituted on) 59'
MF	18	Athbi Shehab		(substituted on) 85'
FW	17	Shabaib Al-Khaldi		(substituted on) 85'
Manager:
(Portugal) Hélio Sousa

Player of the Match:
Nicolás Giménez (United Arab Emirates)

Assistant referees:
Zhou Fei (China)
Zhang Cheng ((China)
Fourth official:
Espen Eskås (Norway)
Reserve assistant referee:
Isaak Bashevkin (Norway)
Video assistant referee:
Jarred Gillett (England)
Assistant video assistant referee:
Rodolpho Toski (Brazil)
