= Jordan national football team results (2020–present) =

Jordan national football team results from the 2020s

- Win Draw Loss

This article provides details of international football games played by the Jordan national football team from 2020 to present.

== Results by year ==
Year	GP	W	D	L	Win %
2020	2	1	1	0	50.00
2021	22	11	3	8	50.00
2022	10	8	0	2	80.00
2023	10	2	2	6	20.00
2024	21	12	5	4	57.14
2025	19	8	5	6	42.11
2026	10	1	4	5	10.00
Total	96	43	22	31	44.79

== Matches ==
Key
Win
Draw
Defeat
Cancelled

=== 2020 ===
25 March Friendly	Jordan	Cancelled	Iraq	Amman, Jordan
				Stadium: Amman International Stadium
Note: The match was cancelled following the increase of COVID-19 cases resulting in a country wide lock down in Jordan.

12 November Friendly	Iraq	0–0	Jordan	Dubai, United Arab Emirates
17:00				Stadium: The Sevens Stadium

16 November Friendly	Jordan	1–0	Syria	Sharjah, United Arab Emirates
17:00	Faisal 13'			Stadium: Khalid bin Mohammed Stadium

=== 2021 ===
1 February Friendly	Jordan	2–0	Tajikistan	Dubai, United Arab Emirates
17:00	Hamdouni 37'; Abu Zrayq 44'	Report		Stadium: Theyab Awana Stadium

5 February Friendly	Jordan	0–1	Tajikistan	Dubai, United Arab Emirates
17:00		Report	Dzhalilov 79'	Stadium: Dubai Sports City Football Academy

15 February Friendly	Uzbekistan	2–0	Jordan	Dubai, United Arab Emirates
18:00 UTC+4	Gafurov 69'; Abdukholiqov 81'	Report		Stadium: Theyab Awana Stadium

20 March Friendly	Jordan	0–0	Oman	Dubai, United Arab Emirates
17:00		Report		Stadium: Maktoum bin Rashid Al Maktoum Stadium

24 March Friendly	Jordan	1–0	Lebanon	Dubai, United Arab Emirates
14:45	Al-Taamari 50'	Report		Stadium: Theyab Awana Stadium

30 March Friendly	Bahrain	1–2	Jordan	Riffa, Bahrain
14:45	Al-Romaihi 78' (pen.)	Report	Faisal 32'; Al-Naimat 52'	Stadium: Bahrain National Stadium; Referee: Sultan Mohamed Al Hammadi (United Arab Emirates)

24 May Friendly	Jordan	1–5	United Arab Emirates	Dubai, United Arab Emirates
20:45 UTC+4	Al-Saify 54'	Report	Mabkhout 17', 29', 50'; Ibrahim 32'; Caio 89'	Stadium: Rashid Stadium; Referee: Ali Al-Samahiji (Bahrain)

31 May Friendly	Jordan	1–1	Vietnam	Sharjah, United Arab Emirates
21:00 UTC+4	Faisal 11'	Report	Al-Rawabdeh 25' (o.g.)	Stadium: Khalid bin Mohammed Stadium; Attendance: 0 Referee: Adel Ali Al Naqbi (United Arab Emirates)

7 June 2022 World Cup qualification second round	Nepal	0–3	Jordan	Kuwait City, Kuwait
19:00 UTC+3		Report	Faisal 23' (pen.), 48'; Al-Arab 67'	Stadium: Jaber Al-Ahmad International Stadium; Attendance: 0 Referee: Mohd Amirul Izwan Yaacob (Malaysia)

11 June 2022 World Cup qualification second round	Kuwait	0–0	Jordan	Kuwait City, Kuwait
22:00 UTC+3		Report		Stadium: Jaber Al-Ahmad International Stadium; Attendance: 0 Referee: Nawaf Shukralla (Bahrain)

15 June 2022 World Cup qualification second round	Australia	1–0	Jordan	Kuwait City, Kuwait
19:00 UTC+3	Souttar 77'	Report		Stadium: Jaber Al-Ahmad International Stadium; Attendance: 0 Referee: Kim Woo-sung (South Korea)

21 June 2021 Arab Cup qualification	Jordan	3–0 (awarded) (Note: The third qualification match was awarded to Jordan due to a forfeit from South Sudan as multiple players and staff had positive COVID-19 test results upon their arrival in Qatar.)	South Sudan	Doha, Qatar
19:00 UTC+3		Report		Stadium: Khalifa International Stadium

4 September Friendly	Haiti	2–0	Jordan	Riffa, Bahrain
19:00 UTC+3	Désiré 15'; Chevreuil 45'	Report		Stadium: Bahrain National Stadium; Referee: Mohammad Khaled (Egypt)

7 September Friendly	Bahrain	1–2	Jordan	Riffa, Bahrain
19:00 UTC+3	Mohammed 90+3' (pen.)	Report	Olwan 15'; Faisal 46'	Stadium: Bahrain National Stadium; Referee: Khaled Al-Taris (Saudi Arabia)

6 October Friendly	Jordan	4–0	Malaysia	Amman, Jordan
19:00 UTC+3	Olwan 34', 47', 49'; Al-Saify 42'	Report		Stadium: Amman International Stadium

12 October Friendly	Jordan	3–0	Uzbekistan	Amman, Jordan
17:00 UTC+3	Faisal 30'; Nasib 56'; Al-Dardour 83'	Report		Stadium: Amman International Stadium

10 November Friendly	Kosovo	0–2	Jordan	Pristina, Kosovo
18:00 UTC+2		Report	Faisal 18'; Al-Dardour 85'	Stadium: Fadil Vokrri Stadium; Attendance: 1,000; Referee: Dejan Jakimovski (North Macedonia)

16 November Friendly	Belarus	1–0	Jordan	Minsk, Belarus
20:00 UTC+3	Yablonsky 20'	Report		Stadium: Dinamo Stadium; Referee: Zaven Hovhannisyan (Armenia)

1 December 2021 Arab Cup Group C	Saudi Arabia	0–1	Jordan	Al Rayyan, Qatar
22:00 UTC+3		Report	Al-Dawsari 62' (o.g.)	Stadium: Education City Stadium; Referee: Bakary Gassama (Gambia)

4 December 2021 Arab Cup Group C	Jordan	0–4	Morocco	Al Rayyan, Qatar
13:00 UTC+3		Report	Jabrane 4'; Benoun 25'; Chibi 45+3'; Rahimi 88' (pen.)	Stadium: Ahmed bin Ali Stadium; Referee: Facundo Tello (Argentina)

7 December 2021 Arab Cup Group C	Jordan	5–1	Palestine	Doha, Qatar
19:00 UTC+3	Abdel-Rahman 9' (pen.); Al-Dardour 24'; Al-Mardi 82'; Al-Naimat 86', 90+1'	Report	Seyam 44'	Stadium: Stadium 974; Referee: Alireza Faghani (Iran)

11 December 2021 Arab Cup quarter-finals	Egypt	3–1	Jordan	Al Wakrah, Qatar
18:00 AST (UTC+3)	Hamdy 45+1'; Refaat 100'; Dawoud 119'	Report	Al-Naimat 12'	Stadium: Al Janoub Stadium; Referee: Said Martínez (Honduras)

=== 2022 ===
28 January Friendly	Jordan	3–1	New Zealand	Abu Dhabi, United Arab Emirates
19:00 UTC+04:00	Olwan 21', 80'; Al-Taamari 33' (pen.)	Report	Wood 30' (pen.)	Stadium: New York University Stadium; Referee: Ahmed Eisa Mohamed (United Arab Emirates)

31 January Friendly	Jordan	2–1	South Sudan	Dubai, United Arab Emirates
19:00 UTC+04:00	Nasib; Al-Dardour	Report	Yuel	Stadium: The Sevens Stadium

28 May Friendly	India	0–2	Jordan	Doha, Qatar
21:00 UTC+3		Report	Amarah 75'; Zrayq 90+4'	Stadium: Suheim bin Hamad Stadium; Referee: Qasim Matar Al Hatmi (Oman)

1 June Friendly	Australia	2–1	Jordan	Doha, Qatar
21:00 UTC+3	Wright 40'; Mabil 68'	Source	Al-Taamari 17'	Stadium: Al Janoub Stadium; Attendance: 0 Referee: Saad Kamil Al-Fadhli (Kuwait)
Note: The match was held behind closed doors.

8 June 2023 Asian Cup qualification third round	Jordan	2–0	Nepal	Kuwait City, Kuwait
22:15 UTC+3	Olwan 69'; Al-Dardour 82' (pen.)	Report		Stadium: Jaber Al-Ahmad International Stadium; Attendance: 1,262; Referee: Chae Sang-hyeop (South Korea)

11 June 2023 Asian Cup qualification third round	Indonesia	0–1	Jordan	Kuwait City, Kuwait
22:15 UTC+3		Report	Al-Naimat 48'	Stadium: Jaber Al-Ahmad International Stadium; Attendance: 2,410; Referee: Yaqoob Abdul Baki (Oman)

14 June 2023 Asian Cup qualification third round	Jordan	3–0	Kuwait	Kuwait City, Kuwait
19:15 UTC+3	Olwan 62'; Al-Mardi 89'; Al-Rawabdeh 90+5'	Report		Stadium: Jaber Al-Ahmad International Stadium; Attendance: 18,170; Referee: Mohd Amirul Izwan Yaacob (Malaysia)

23 September Jordan International Tournament semi-finals	Jordan	2–0	Syria	Amman, Jordan
22:15 UTC+3	Samir 28'; Al-Naimat 44'			Stadium: King Abdullah II Stadium

26 September Jordan International Tournament final	Jordan	1–0	Oman	Amman, Jordan
22:15 UTC+3	Haddad 66' (pen.)			Stadium: Amman International Stadium

17 November Friendly	Jordan	1–3	Spain	Amman, Jordan
19:00 UTC+3	Samir 90+2'		Fati 13'; Gavi 56'; Williams 84'	Stadium: Amman International Stadium

=== 2023 ===
28 March Friendly	Jordan	4–0	Philippines	Al Wakrah, Qatar
21:30 UTC+3	Al-Taamari 10' (pen.), 26'; Al-Naimat 56'; Sadeh 58'	Report		Stadium: Saoud bin Abdulrahman Stadium

16 June Friendly	Serbia	3–2	Jordan	Vienna, Austria
21:30 UTC+3	Eraković 7'; Joveljić 83', 88'	Report	Al-Mardi 54'; Al-Taamari 67'	Stadium: Franz Horr Stadium; Attendance: 8,854; Referee: Stefan Ebner (Austria)

19 June Friendly	Jamaica	1–2	Jordan	Wiener Neustadt, Austria
15:00 UTC+3	Burke 39' (pen.)	Report	Al-Mardi 56'; Olwan 63'	Stadium: Stadion Wiener Neustadt; Referee: Harald Lechner (Austria)

7 September Friendly	Norway	6–0	Jordan	Oslo, Norway
18:00 UTC+1	Nusa 11'; Ajer 23'; Larsen 31'; Bjørkan 41'; Finne 79'; Vetlesen 90+1'	Report		Stadium: Ullevaal Stadion; Referee: Kristoffer Karlsson (Sweden)

12 September Friendly	Azerbaijan	2–1	Jordan	Baku, Azerbaijan
18:00 UTC+3	Makhmudov 45+1' (pen.); Dadashov 79'	Report	Al-Rashdan 57'	Stadium: Dalga Arena

13 October Jordan International Tournament semi-finals	Jordan	1–3	Iran	Amman, Jordan
21:00 UTC+3	Al-Naimat 74'	Report	Azmoun 6'; Taremi 28'; Mohammadi 90+4'	Stadium: Amman International Stadium

16 October Jordan International Tournament third place	Jordan	2–2 (3–5 p)	Iraq	Amman, Jordan
	Al-Naimat 31', 79'	Report	Hussein 70'; Al-Hammadi 75'	Stadium: Amman International Stadium
	Penalties
	Al-Mardi (penalty scored); Sadeh (penalty scored); Al-Rashdan (penalty scored); Haddad (penalty missed)		(penalty scored) Doski; (penalty scored) Al-Hamadi; (penalty scored) Adnan; (penalty scored) Hussein; (penalty scored) Attwan

16 November 2026 World Cup qualification second round	Tajikistan	1–1	Jordan	Dushanbe, Tajikistan
18:00 UTC+5	Samiev 89'	Report	Al-Naimat 90+3'	Stadium: Pamir Stadium; Attendance: 13,650; Referee: Ali Sabah (Iraq)

21 November 2026 World Cup qualification second round	Jordan	0–2	Saudi Arabia	Amman, Jordan
19:00 UTC+3		Report	Al-Shehri 8', 30'	Stadium: Amman International Stadium; Referee: Ahmed Al-Kaf (Oman)

28 December Friendly	Lebanon	2–1	Jordan	Tripoli, Lebanon
14:00 UTC+2	Haidar 23'; Mansour 90+3' (pen.)	Report	Al-Dardour 3'	Stadium: Tripoli Municipal Stadium; Attendance: 0 Referee: Maher Al Ali (Lebanon)

=== 2024 ===
5 January Friendly	Qatar	1–2	Jordan	Doha, Qatar
19:00 UTC+3	Afif 15'	Report	Al-Naimat 50'; Olwan 57' (pen.)	Stadium: Thani bin Jassim Stadium; Referee: Ammar Ashkanani (Kuwait)

9 January Friendly	Japan	6–1	Jordan	Doha, Qatar
14:30 UTC+3	Itakura 14'; Nakamura 19'; 32' (o.g.); Minamino 45'; Asano 71'; Maeda 79'	Report	Rateb 87'	Stadium: Al Ersal Stadium

15 January 2023 Asian Cup Group E	Malaysia	0–4	Jordan	Al Wakrah, Qatar
20:30 UTC+3		Report	Al-Mardi 12', 32'; Al-Taamari 18' (pen.), 85'	Stadium: Al Janoub Stadium; Attendance: 20,410; Referee: Mohammed Abdulla Hassan Mohamed (United Arab Emirates)

20 January 2023 Asian Cup Group E	Jordan	2–2	South Korea	Doha, Qatar
14:30 UTC+3	Park Yong-woo 37' (o.g.); Al-Naimat 45+6'	Report	Son Heung-min 9' (pen.); Al-Arab 90+1' (o.g.)	Stadium: Al Thumama Stadium; Attendance: 36,627; Referee: Salman Ahmad Falahi (Qatar)

25 January 2023 Asian Cup Group E	Jordan	0–1	Bahrain	Al Rayyan, Qatar
14:30 UTC+3			Helal 34'	Stadium: Khalifa International Stadium

29 January 2023 Asian Cup round of 16	Iraq	2–3	Jordan	Al Rayyan, Qatar
14:30 UTC+3	Natiq 68'; Hussein 76'		Al-Naimat 45+1'; Al-Arab 90+5'; Al-Rashdan 90+7'	Stadium: Khalifa International Stadium

2 February 2023 Asian Cup quarter-finals	Tajikistan	0–1	Jordan	Al Rayyan, Qatar
14:30 UTC+3		Report	Hanonov 66' (o.g.)	Stadium: Ahmad bin Ali Stadium; Attendance: 35,530; Referee: Fu Ming (China)

6 February 2023 Asian Cup semi-finals	Jordan	2–0	South Korea	Al Rayyan, Qatar
18:00	Al-Naimat 53'; Al-Taamari 66'	Report		Stadium: Ahmad bin Ali Stadium; Attendance: 42,850; Referee: Mohammed Abdulla Hassan Mohamed (United Arab Emirates)

10 February 2023 Asian Cup final	Jordan	1–3	Qatar	Lusail, Qatar
18:00	Al-Naimat 67'	Report	Afif 22' (pen.), 73' (pen.), 90+5' (pen.)	Stadium: Lusail Stadium; Attendance: 86,492; Referee: Ma Ning (China)

21 March 2026 World Cup qualification second round	Pakistan	0–3	Jordan	Islamabad, Pakistan
10:00		Report	Al-Taamari 2', 86'; Olwan 9'	Stadium: Jinnah Sports Stadium; Attendance: 9,000; Referee: Rustam Lutfullin (Uzbekistan)

26 March 2026 World Cup qualification second round	Jordan	7–0	Pakistan	Amman, Jordan
22:00	Al-Taamari 2', 62', 79'; Al-Naimat 28' (pen.); Al-Rosan 52'; Olwan 75'; Abu Zrayq 83'	Report		Stadium: Amman International Stadium; Attendance: 14,700; Referee: Gamini Nivon Robesh (Sri Lanka)

6 June 2026 World Cup qualification second round	Jordan	3–0	Tajikistan	Amman, Jordan
	Olwan 51'; Al-Naimat 68'; Sami 90+4'	Report		Stadium: Amman International Stadium; Attendance: 14,795; Referee: Ahmed Al-Kaf (Oman)

11 June 2026 World Cup qualification second round	Saudi Arabia	1–2	Jordan	Riyadh, Saudi Arabia
21:00	Lajami 16'	Report	Olwan 27'; Al-Rawabdeh 45+2'	Stadium: King Saud University Stadium; Attendance: 17,871; Referee: Adel Al Naqbi (United Arab Emirates)

27 August Friendly	Jordan	0–0	North Korea	Amman, Jordan
19:00		Report		Stadium: Petra Stadium; Attendance: 0
Note: The match was held behind closed doors.

29 August Friendly	Jordan	2–1	North Korea	Amman, Jordan
19:00	Olwan	Report	Goal	Stadium: Amman International Stadium; Attendance: 0
Note: The match will be held behind closed doors.

5 September 2026 World Cup qualification third round	Jordan	1–1	Kuwait	Amman, Jordan
21:00	Al-Taamari 14'	Report (FIFA); Report (AFC)	Nasser 90+2' (pen.)	Stadium: Amman International Stadium; Attendance: 13,555; Referee: Adel Al Naqbi (United Arab Emirates)

10 September 2026 World Cup qualification third round	Palestine	1–3	Jordan	Kuala Lumpur, Malaysia (Note: Palestine play all their home matches at a neutral venue until further notice, due to the ongoing Gaza war.)
19:00 UTC+8	Ali 41'	Report (FIFA); Report (AFC)	Al-Naimat 5', 50'; Al-Rawabdeh 72'	Stadium: Kuala Lumpur Stadium; Attendance: 3,012; Referee: Majed Al-Shamrani (Saudi Arabia)

10 October 2026 World Cup qualification third round	Jordan	0–2	South Korea	Amman, Jordan
17:00		Report (FIFA); Report (AFC)	Lee Jae-sung 38'; Oh Hyun-gyu 68'	Stadium: Amman International Stadium; Attendance: 14,655; Referee: Hiroyuki Kimura (Japan)

15 October 2026 World Cup qualification third round	Jordan	4–0	Oman	Amman, Jordan
	Al-Naimat 26', 54'; Olwan 49' (pen.), 87'	Report (FIFA); Report (AFC)		Stadium: Amman International Stadium; Attendance: 14,515; Referee: Khalid Saleh Al Turais (Saudi Arabia)

14 November 2026 World Cup qualification third round	Iraq	0–0	Jordan	Basra, Iraq
		Report (FIFA); Report (AFC)		Stadium: Basra International Stadium; Attendance: 65,000; Referee: Mohammed Al Hoaish (Saudi Arabia)

19 November 2026 World Cup qualification third round	Kuwait	1–1	Jordan	Kuwait City, Kuwait
	Dahman 68'	Report (FIFA); Report (AFC)	Al-Naimat 21'	Stadium: Jaber Al-Ahmad International Stadium; Attendance: 29,400; Referee: Nazmi Nasaruddin (Malaysia)

=== 2025 ===
27 January Friendly	Uzbekistan	0–0	Jordan	Al Rayyan, Qatar
20:00 UTC+3		Report		Stadium: Abdullah bin Khalifa Stadium; Attendance: 0 Referee: Hamad Al Essay (Qatar)
Note: The match was held behind closed doors.

14 March Friendly	Jordan	1–1	North Korea	Amman, Jordan
21:15 UTC+3	Al-Naimat 43'	Report	? 74' (pen.)	Stadium: Amman International Stadium; Attendance: 0
Note: The match was held behind closed doors..

20 March 2026 World Cup qualification third round	Jordan	3–1	Palestine	Amman, Jordan
21:15 UTC+3	Al-Arab 3'; Nasib 11'; Al-Taamari 45+3'	Report (FIFA); Report (AFC)	Seyam 33'	Stadium: Amman International Stadium; Attendance: 9,555; Referee: Shaun Evans (Australia)

25 March 2026 World Cup qualification third round	South Korea	1–1	Jordan	Suwon, South Korea
20:00 UTC+9	Lee Jae-Sung 5'	Report (FIFA); Report (AFC)	Al-Mardi 30'	Stadium: Suwon World Cup Stadium; Attendance: 41,582; Referee: Ilgiz Tantashev (Uzbekistan)

30 May Friendly	Saudi Arabia	2–0	Jordan	Dammam, Saudi Arabia
18:40 UTC+3	Al-Tombakti 20'; Al-Saad 76'	Report		Stadium: Al-Ettifaq Club Stadium; Attendance: 0
Note: The match was held behind closed doors.

5 June 2026 World Cup qualification third round	Oman	0–3	Jordan	Muscat, Oman
20:00 UTC+4		Report (FIFA); Report (AFC)	Olwan 45+7' (pen.), 51', 64'	Stadium: Sultan Qaboos Sports Complex; Attendance: 13,878; Referee: Khalid Saleh Al-Turais (Saudi Arabia)
Note: Jordan officially qualified for the 2026 FIFA World Cup after defeating Oman, marking their first entery into the FIFA World Cup series.

10 June 2026 World Cup qualification third round	Jordan	0–1	Iraq	Amman, Jordan
21:15 UTC+3		Report (FIFA); Report (AFC)	Jassim 77'	Stadium: Amman International Stadium; Attendance: 15,502; Referee: Omar Mohamed Al Ali (United Arab Emirates)

4 September Friendly	Russia	0–0	Jordan	Moscow, Russia
20:00 UTC+3		Report		Stadium: Otkrytie Arena; Attendance: 24,915; Referee: Ilgiz Tantashev (Uzbekistan)

9 September Friendly	Jordan	3–0	Dominican Republic	Amman, Jordan
20:00 UTC+3	Olwan 7'; Sadeh 48'; Abu Zrayq 90+3'	Report		Stadium: Amman International Stadium; Attendance: 2,405; Referee: Feras Taweel (Syria)

10 October Friendly	Jordan	0–1	Bolivia	Istanbul, Türkiye
19:00 UTC+3		Report	Matheus 90'	Stadium: Recep Tayyip Erdoğan Stadium; Referee: Mehmet Türkmen (Turkey)

14 October Friendly	Albania	4–2	Jordan	Tirana, Albania
19:00 UTC+2	Abualnadi 40' (o.g.); Broja 65'; Hoxha 75'; Bajrami 79'	Report	Al-Rashdan 27'; Olwan 90'	Stadium: Arena Kombëtare; Attendance: 9,265; Referee: Lukas Fähndrich (Switzerland)

14 November Friendly	Tunisia	3–2	Jordan	Tunis, Tunisia
17:45 UTC+1	Abdi 44'; Talbi 67'; Achouri 85'	Report	Al-Naimat 28'; Jamous 51'	Stadium: Hammadi Agrebi Stadium; Attendance: 13,000; Referee: Samir Guezzaz (Morocco)

18 November Friendly	Jordan	0–0	Mali	Tunis, Tunisia
20:30 UTC+1		Report		Stadium: Hammadi Agrebi Stadium; Referee: Nidhal Letaief (Tunisia)

3 December 2025 Arab Cup Group C	Jordan	2–1	United Arab Emirates	Al Khor, Qatar
20:00 UTC+3	Olwan 20' (pen.); Al-Naimat 63'	Report	Bruno 47'	Stadium: Al Bayt Stadium; Attendance: 30,759; Referee: Ahmed Al-Kaf (Oman)

6 December 2025 Arab Cup Group C	Kuwait	1–3	Jordan	Al Rayyan, Qatar
14:00 UTC+3	Nasser 84'	Report	Taha 17'; Al-Rosan 49'; Olwan 90+7' (pen.)	Stadium: Al Rayyan Stadium; Attendance: 35,933; Referee: Cristián Garay (Chile)

9 December 2025 Arab Cup Group C	Egypt	0–3	Jordan	Al Khor, Qatar
17:30 UTC+3		Report	Abu Hashish 19'; Abu Zrayq 41'; Olwan 90+2' (pen.)	Stadium: Al Bayt Stadium; Attendance: 55,658; Referee: Ismail Elfath (United States)

12 December 2025 Arab Cup quarter-finals	Jordan	1–0	Iraq	Al Rayyan, Qatar
17:30 UTC+3	Olwan 41' (pen.)	Report		Stadium: Education City Stadium; Attendance: 43,486; Referee: Espen Eskås (Norway)

15 December 2025 Arab Cup semi-finals	Saudi Arabia	0–1	Jordan	Al Khor, Qatar
20:30 UTC+3		Report	Al-Rashdan 66'	Stadium: Al Bayt Stadium; Attendance: 62,825; Referee: Juan Gabriel Benítez (Paraguay)

18 December 2025 Arab Cup final	Jordan	2–3 (a.e.t.)	Morocco	Lusail, Qatar
19:00 UTC+3	Olwan 48', 68' (pen.)		Tannane 4'; Hamdallah 88', 100'	Stadium: Lusail Stadium; Attendance: 84,517; Referee: Glenn Nyberg (Sweden)

=== 2026 ===
27 March 2026 Jordan International Tournament	Jordan	2–2	Costa Rica	Antalya, Türkiye (Note: The 2026 edition of the Jordan International Tournament between Jordan, Iran, Nigera, and Costa Rica was moved from Amman, Jordan to Antalya, Türkiye due to 2026 Iran war.)
20:30 UTC+3	Faisal 50' (pen.); Sabra 76'	Report	Alcócer 84' (pen.); Madrigal 90+1'	Stadium: Mardan Sports Complex; Attendance: 0 Referee: Kadir Sağlam (Turkey)

31 March 2026 Jordan International Tournament	Jordan	2–2	Nigeria	Antalya, Türkiye
20:30 UTC+3	Al-Taamari 17'; Al-Dawoud 77'	Report	Simon 25'; Fernandez 41'	Stadium: Mardan Sports Complex; Attendance: 0 Referee: Atilla Karaoğlan (Turkey)

31 May Friendly	Switzerland	4–1	Jordan	St. Gallen, Switzerland
15:00 UTC+2	Embolo 27' (pen.); Ndoye 33'; Xhaka 45+9' (pen.); Fassnacht 79'	Report	Al-Fakhouri 52'	Stadium: Kybunpark; Attendance: 20,660; Referee: Rohit Saggi (Norway)

7 June Friendly	Colombia	2–0	Jordan	San Diego, California, United States
16:00 UTC−7	Arias 41', 55'	Report		Stadium: Snapdragon Stadium; Attendance: 28,831; Referee: Jesús López Valle (Mexico)

16 June 2026 World Cup Group J	Austria	3–1	Jordan	Santa Clara, California, United States
21:00 UTC−7	Schmid 21'; Al-Arab 76' (o.g.); Arnautović 90+12' (pen.)	Report	Olwan 50'	Stadium: Levi's Stadium; Attendance: 68,527; Referee: Dahane Beida (Maritania)

22 June 2026 World Cup Group J	Jordan	1–2	Algeria	Santa Clara, California, United States
20:00 UTC−7	Al-Rashdan 36'	Report	Benbouali 69'; Gouiri 82'	Stadium: Levi's Stadium; Attendance: 68,371; Referee: Slavko Vinčić (Slovenia)

27 June 2026 World Cup Group J	Jordan	1–3	Argentina	Arlington, Texas, United States
21:00 UTC−5	Al-Taamari 55'	Report	Lo Celso 19'; La. Martínez 31' (pen.); Messi 80'	Stadium: AT&T Stadium; Attendance: 70,649; Referee: István Kovács (Romania)

27 September Friendly	Jordan	1–1	Syria	Amman, Jordan
20:00 UTC+3	Olwan 37'	Report	Moustfa 51'	Stadium: King Abdullah II Stadium; Referee: Mohamad Issa (Lebanon)

6 October Friendly	Jordan	0–0	Venezuela	Amman, Jordan
20:00 UTC+3		Report		Stadium: King Abdullah II Stadium; Referee: Mohanad Qasim Sarray (Iraq)

13 November Friendly	Jordan	Cancelled	Indonesia	Amman, Jordan
		Report		Stadium: Amman International Stadium
Note: On 5 November, the Jordan Football Association announced the match agaisnt Indonesia had been cancelled by the requst from Indonesia amit the ongoing Houthi–Saudi conflict in the region.

17 November Friendly	Jordan	2–0	Australia	Doha, Qatar (Note: On 12 November, the Jordan Football Association and Football Australia announced that the match would be relocated from Amman, Jordan to Doha, Qatar due to "security concerns.")
19:00 UTC+3	Al-Tamaari 34'; Olwan 90+3'	Report		Stadium: Suheim bin Hamad Stadium; Referee: Saud Al-Samhan (Kuwait)

=== 2027 ===
2 January Friendly	Saudi Arabia	Cancelled	Jordan	Al Khobar, Saudi Arabia
		Report
Note: On 5 November, the Saudi Arabia Football Federation announced the cancellation of their training camp following the postponement of the 2027 AFC Asian Cup, which included friendlies against Qatar and Jordan; Match was intended to be held behind closed doors.

December 2027 Asian Cup Group B	Uzbekistan	v	Jordan	Jeddah, Saudi Arabia
		Report		Stadium: King Abdullah Sports City Stadium

December 2027 Asian Cup Group B	Jordan	v	Bahrain	Riyadh, Saudi Arabia
		Report		Stadium: Al-Shabab Club Stadium

December 2027 Asian Cup Group B	North Korea	v	Jordan	Riyadh, Saudi Arabia
		Report		Stadium: Imam Mohammed Ibn Saud University Stadium

== Head-to-head records ==
As of match played 17 November 2026 against Australia.

Key

Positive balance (more wins than losses)
Neutral balance (as many wins as losses)
Negative balance (more losses than wins)

Head to head records
Opponent	P	W	D	L	GF	GA	W%	D%	L%
Albania	1	0	0	1	2	4	0	0	100
Algeria	1	0	0	1	1	2	0	0	100
Argentina	1	0	0	1	1	2	0	0	100
Australia	3	1	0	2	3	3	33.33	0	66.67
Azerbaijan	1	0	0	1	1	2	0	0	100
Austria	1	0	0	1	1	3	0	0	100
Bahrain	3	2	0	1	4	3	66.67	0	33.33
Belarus	1	0	0	1	0	1	0	0	100
Bolivia	1	0	0	1	0	1	0	0	100
Colombia	1	0	0	1	0	2	0	0	100
Costa Rica	1	0	1	0	2	2	0	100	0
Dominican Republic	1	1	0	0	3	0	100	0	0
Egypt	2	1	0	1	4	3	50	0	50
Haiti	1	0	0	1	0	2	0	0	100
India	1	1	0	0	2	0	100	0	0
Indonesia	1	1	0	0	1	0	100	0	0
Iran	1	0	0	1	1	3	0	0	100
Iraq	6	2	3	1	6	5	33.33	50	16.67
Jamaica	1	1	0	0	2	1	100	0	0
Japan	1	0	0	1	1	6	0	0	100
Kosovo	1	1	0	0	2	0	100	0	0
Kuwait	5	2	3	0	8	3	40	60	0
Lebanon	2	1	0	1	3	2	50	0	50
Malaysia	2	2	0	0	8	0	100	0	0
Mali	1	0	1	0	0	0	0	100	0
Morocco	2	0	0	2	2	7	0	0	100
Nepal	2	2	0	0	5	0	100	0	0
New Zealand	1	1	0	0	3	1	100	0	0
Nigeria	1	0	1	0	2	2	0	100	0
North Korea	3	1	2	0	3	2	33.33	66.67	0
Norway	1	0	0	1	0	6	0	0	100
Oman	4	3	1	0	7	0	75	25	0
Pakistan	2	2	0	0	10	0	100	0	0
Palestine	3	3	0	0	11	3	100	0	0
Philippines	1	1	0	0	4	0	100	0	0
Qatar	2	1	0	1	3	4	50	0	50
Russia	1	0	1	0	0	0	0	100	0
Saudi Arabia	5	3	0	2	5	5	60	0	40
Serbia	1	0	0	1	2	3	0	0	100
South Korea	4	1	2	1	5	5	25	50	25
South Sudan	2	2	0	0	5	1	100	0	0
Spain	1	0	0	1	1	3	0	0	100
Switzerland	1	0	0	1	1	4	0	0	100
Syria	3	2	1	0	4	1	66.67	33.33	0
Tajikistan	5	3	1	1	7	2	60	20	20
Tunisia	1	0	0	1	2	3	0	0	100
United Arab Emirates	2	1	0	1	3	6	50	0	50
Uzbekistan	3	1	1	1	3	2	33.33	33.33	33.33
Venezuela	1	0	1	0	0	0	0	100	0
Vietnam	1	0	1	0	0	0	0	100	0
