= List of United Arab Emirates international footballers born outside the United Arab Emirates =

This is a list of footballers who have played international football for the UAE national football team and that were born outside of Emirati territory.

The following players:

1. have played at least one game for the full (senior male) United Arab Emirates national team.
2. were born outside of UAE.

== List of players ==
Player	Place of birth	Pos	Caps	Years active	Notes	Ref
Mutaz Abdulla	(Qatar) Doha	GK	25	2000–2006		
Mohammed Salem Al-Enazi	(Qatar) Doha	FW	2	2009	(Note: Al-Enazi represented the Qatari national team from 1996 to 2003 before getting banned due to missing training with Al Rayyan for two weeks)	
Mohammed Abdulrahman	(Saudi Arabia) Riyadh	MF	46	2010–2019		
Omar Abdulrahman	(Saudi Arabia) Riyadh	MF	74	2011–2022		
Ismail Ahmed	(Morocco) Temara	DF	45	2012–2019		
Caio Canedo	(Brazil) Volta Redonda	MF	61	2020–		
Fábio Lima	(Brazil) Araçagi	MF	49	2020–		
Sebastián Tagliabúe	(Argentina) Olivos	FW	19	2020–2023		
Bruno	(Brazil) Anchieta	FW	25	2024–		
Isam Faiz	(Morocco) Khouribga	MF	17	2024–		
Kouame Autonne	(Ivory Coast) Ouragahio	DF	18	2024–		
Mackenzie Hunt	(England) Liverpool	MF	8	2024–		
Marcus Meloni	(Brazil) São Paulo	DF	26	2024–		
Ala Zhir	(Tunisia) Monastir	DF	11	2025–		
Álvaro	(Brazil) Nova Venécia	FW	3	2025–		
Caio Lucas	(Brazil) Araçatuba	FW	13	2025–		
Erik	(Brazil) Quaraí	DF	4	2025–		
Gastón Suárez	(Argentina) Córdoba	MF	2	2025–		
Luanzinho	(Brazil) Ariquemes	MF	16	2025–		
Lucas Pimenta	(Brazil) Niterói	DF	20	2025–		
Mohammed Rabii	(Morocco) Casablanca	DF	1	2025–		
Nicolás Giménez	(Argentina) San Justo	MF	18	2025–		
Richard Akonnor	(Ghana) Accra	DF	8	2025–		
Rúben Canedo	(Portugal) Vila Nova de Gaia	DF	16	2025–		
Saša Ivković	(Croatia) Vukovar	DF	9	2025–		
Yuri César	(Brazil) Volta Redonda	FW	2	2026–		
Mamadou Coulibaly	(Ivory Coast) Abidjan	MF	5	2026–		
Guilherme Bala	(Brazil) Rio de Janeiro	FW	4	2026–		
Ousmane Camara	(Guinea) Conakry	FW	6	2026–		

== List of country by birth ==
Country	Total
Brazil	11
Argentina	3
Morocco	3
Ivory Coast	2
Qatar	2
Saudi Arabia	2
Croatia	1
England	1
Ghana	1
Guinea	1
Portugal	1
Tunisia	1

== See also ==
- Emirati nationality law
