= 2025 FIFA Arab Cup final =

- Lusail Stadium, where the match was played
- Event: 2025 FIFA Arab Cup
Jordan	Morocco
(Jordan)	(Morocco)
2	3
- After extra time
- Date: 18 December 2025
- Venue: Lusail Stadium, Lusail
- Man of the Match: Abderrazak Hamdallah (Morocco)
- Referee: Glenn Nyberg (Sweden)
- Attendance: 84,517
- Weather: Rainy; 16 °C (61 °F); 100% humidity

The 2025 FIFA Arab Cup final was a football match to determine the winners of the 2025 FIFA Arab Cup. The match was held at Lusail Stadium in Lusail, Qatar, on 18 December 2025 and it was contested by Morocco and Jordan, the winners of the semi-finals. The date of the final marked exactly three years to the day since the 2022 FIFA World Cup final, also held at Lusail, and exactly four years since the 2021 FIFA Arab Cup final, also held in Qatar (in a different stadium).

== Route to the final ==
Jordan
Round
Morocco
Opponents
Result
Group stage
Opponents
Result
United Arab Emirates
2–1
Match 1
Comoros
3–1
Kuwait
3–1
Match 2
Oman
0–0
Egypt
3–0
Match 3
Saudi Arabia
1–0
Group C winners

Pos	Team	Pld	Pts
1	Jordan	3	9
2	United Arab Emirates	3	4
3	Egypt	3	2
4	Kuwait	3	1

Source: FIFA
Final standings
Group B winners

Pos	Team	Pld	Pts
1	Morocco	3	7
2	Saudi Arabia	3	6
3	Oman	3	4
4	Comoros	3	0

Source: FIFA
Opponents
Result
Knockout stage
Opponents
Result
Iraq
1–0
Quarter-final
Syria
1–0
Saudi Arabia
1–0
Semi-final
United Arab Emirates
3–0

== Match details ==
18 December 2025
19:00

Jordan	2–3 (a.e.t.)	Morocco
Olwan 48', 68' (pen.)	Report	Tannane 4'; Hamdallah 88', 100'

Lusail Stadium, Lusail
Attendance: 84,517
Referee: Glenn Nyberg (Sweden)

Jordan	Morocco

GK	1	Yazeed Abulaila
CB	3	Abdallah Nasib
CB	19	Saed Al-Rosan
CB	4	Husam Abu Dahab	(yellow card) 77'	(substituted off) 104'
RM	17	Issam Smeeri		(substituted off) 46'
CM	21	Nizar Al-Rashdan
CM	6	Amer Jamous		(substituted off) 81'
LM	20	Mohannad Abu Taha
RF	7	Mohammad Abu Zrayq		(substituted off) 46'
CF	9	Ali Olwan
LF	13	Mahmoud Al-Mardi (c)		(substituted off) 90'
Substitutions:
MF	23	Adham Al-Quraishi		(substituted on) 46'
FW	8	Odeh Al-Fakhouri		(substituted on) 46' (substituted off) 112'
MF	14	Rajaei Ayed	(yellow card) 119'	(substituted on) 81'
DF	2	Mohammad Abu Hashish		(substituted on) 90'
DF	16	Ali Hajabi		(substituted on) 104'
FW	10	Ahmad Ersan		(substituted on) 112'
Manager:
(Morocco) Jamal Sellami

GK	12	Mehdi Benabid
RB	7	Mohamed Boulacsoute
CB	4	Soufiane Bouftini		(substituted off) 71'
CB	18	Marwane Saâdane
LB	19	Hamza El Moussaoui		(substituted off) 80'
DM	6	Mohamed Rabie Hrimat (c)
DM	3	Anas Bach		(substituted off) 71'
AM	10	Amin Zahzouh	(yellow card) 113'
AM	14	Oussama Tannane		(substituted off) 71'
CF	11	Walid Azaro		(substituted off) 106'
CF	21	Karim El Berkaoui		(substituted off) 17'
Substitutions:
MF	16	Aschraf El Mahdioui		(substituted on) 17'
MF	8	Sabir Bougrine		(substituted on) 71'
FW	9	Abderrazak Hamdallah		(substituted on) 71'
FW	17	Mounir Chouiar		(substituted on) 71'
DF	5	Mahmoud Bentayg		(substituted on) 80'
DF	15	Marouane Louadni	(yellow card) 87'	(substituted on) 106'
Manager:
Tarik Sektioui

Man of the Match:
Abderrazak Hamdallah (Morocco)

Assistant referees:
Mahbod Beigi (Sweden)
Andreas Söderkvist (Sweden)
Fourth official:
Ma Ning (China)
Reserve assistant referee:
Zhou Fei (China)
Video assistant referee:
Fedayi San (Switzerland)
Assistant video assistant referee:
Khamis Al-Marri (Qatar)
Support video assistant referee:
Abdullah Al-Shehri (Saudi Arabia)

Match rules

- 90 minutes
- 30 minutes of extra time if necessary
- Penalty shoot-out if scores still level
- Maximum of twelve named substitutes
- Maximum of five substitutions, with a sixth allowed in extra time (Note: Each team was given only three opportunities to make substitutions, with a fourth opportunity in extra time, excluding substitutions made at half-time, before the start of extra time and at half-time in extra time.)

== See also ==
- 2025 FIFA Arab Cup
