= Hamad Al-Meqbaali =

Emirati footballer (born 2003)

Personal information
- Full name: Hamad Abdulla Mohamed Salem Al-Meqbaali
- Date of birth: 13 July 2003 (age 23)
- Place of birth: Fujairah, United Arab Emirates
- Height: 1.86 m (6 ft 1 in)
- Position: Goalkeeper

Team information
- Current team: Shabab Al Ahli
- Number: 22

Youth career
- 2010–2021: Al-Fujairah

Senior career*
Years	Team	Apps	(Gls)
2021–2023	Al-Fujairah	8	(0)
2023–	Shabab Al Ahli	53	(0)

International career^{‡}
2023–2025	United Arab Emirates U23		
2025–	United Arab Emirates	8	(0)
- * Club domestic league appearances and goals as of 17 September 2026 ‡ National team caps and goals as of 17 November 2026

Hamad Al-Meqbaali (Arabic: حمد المقبالي; born 13 July 2003) is an Emirati professional football player who plays as a goalkeeper for Shabab Al Ahli and the United Arab Emirates national team.

== Club career ==
Al-Meqbaali started his career at the youth teams of Al-Fujairah, He reached the first team in the 2020–2021 season. On 7 January 2023, Al-Meqbaali joined Pro League side Shabab Al Ahli.

== International career ==
Al-Meqbaali was called up to the United Arab Emirates to participate in 2025 FIFA Arab Cup. In the competition's quarter-finals against Algeria, he produced a decisive penalty save in the 7–6 shootout victory, sending his nation into the semi-finals.

== Honours ==
Shabab Al Ahli

- UAE Pro League: 2022–23, 2024–25
- UAE Super Cup: 2023, 2024
