= Ali Olwan =

Jordanian footballer (born 2000)

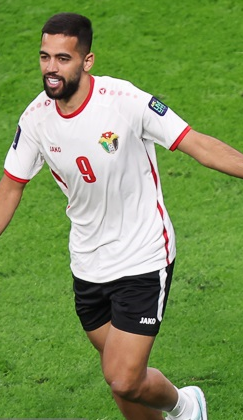
- Olwan playing for Jordan at the 2023 AFC Asian Cup

Personal information
- Full name: Ali Iyad Ali Olwan
- Date of birth: 26 March 2000 (age 26)
- Place of birth: Amman, Jordan
- Height: 1.84 m (6 ft 0 in)
- Position: Forward

Team information
- Current team: Al-Sailiya
- Number: 9

Youth career
- Al-Wehdat
- Al-Jazeera

Senior career*
Years	Team	Apps	(Gls)
2018–2022	Al-Jazeera		(13)
2022–2024	Al-Shamal	42	(9)
2024	→ Al-Khor (loan)	6	(4)
2024–2025	Selangor	10	(2)
2025–2026	Al-Karma	11	(5)
2026–	Al-Sailiya	9	(2)

International career^{‡}
2020–	Jordan	71	(32)
Medal record
Representing Jordan
Men's football
AFC Asian Cup
Runner-up	2023 Qatar	Team
FIFA Arab Cup
Runner-up	2025 Qatar	Team
- * Club domestic league appearances and goals as of 30 October 2026 ‡ National team caps and goals as of 19:00, 17 November 2026 (UTC)

Ali Iyad Ali Olwan (Arabic: علي إياد علي علوان; born 26 March 2000) is a Jordanian professional footballer who plays as a forward for Qatar Stars League club Al-Sailiya and the Jordan national team.

== Club career ==
=== Early career ===
Olwan was a product of Amman based clubs Al-Wehdat and later Al-Jazeera. In July 2020, he was promoted to Al-Jazeera's first time at the age of 18.

=== Al-Shamal ===
In January 2022, Olwan joined Qatar Stars League club Al-Shamal in a 2.5 years contract for a reported transfer fee of €200,000.

=== Selangor ===
Following his expiring contract with Al-Shamal, Olwan moved abroad to Malaysia and joined Malaysia Super League club Selangor on 5 August 2024. On 14 September, Olwan scored on his debut for the club in a 4–0 league win over Kuching City. During the 2024–25 AFC Champions League Two fixture against Korean giants Jeonbuk Hyundai Motors on 23 October 2024, Olwan scored a goal to secure a 2–1 win for Selangor.

=== Al-Karma ===
On 25 July 2025, Olwan joined Iraq Stars League club Al-Karma on a one-year $450,000 contract, with an option for an additional season.

=== Al-Sailiya ===
On 24 January 2026, Olwan returned to Qatar to join Al-Sailiya.

== International career ==
On 12 November 2020, Olwan made his international debut with Jordan national team in a goalless friendly draw against Iraq.

On 4 September 2021, Olwan scored his first international goal against Bahrain at the Bahrain National Stadium. On 6 October 2021, Olwan scored his first professional career hat-trick in a 4–0 win against Malaysia at the Amman International Stadium. A month later, Olwan participated in the 2021 FIFA Arab Cup, reaching the quarter-finals with Jordan.

In January 2024, Olwan was named in Jordan's squad for the 2023 AFC Asian Cup that reached the final. He started in all three group stage games and then in two knockout stage games against Iraq and Tajikistan, before missing out the semi-finals due to yellow card accumulation. Despite having no goals during the competition, Olwan's ability to hold the ball and dribble in tight spaces made him a threat to the opponent's defense, liberating spaces for his teammates to score.

On 5 June 2025, he netted his second international hat-trick in a 3–0 away win over Oman during the 2026 FIFA World Cup qualification, securing his nation's first-ever participation in the FIFA World Cup.

On 17 May 2026, Olwan was named in Jordan's 30-men preliminary squad for the 2026 FIFA World Cup. On 2 June, he was selected in the final 26-man squad for the tournament. Later that month, on 16 June, he scored his country's first-ever World Cup goal, equalizing against Austria in what ultimately ended as a 3–1 defeat.

== Career statistics ==
=== Club ===
As of match played 10 September 2026.

Information regarding Olwan's career in the Jordanian Pro League is scarce.

Appearances and goals by club, season and competition
Club	Season	League			National cup		League cup (Note: Includes Amir of Qatar Cup and Malaysia Cup.)		Continental (Note: Includes AFC Champions League Two.)		Other (Note: Includes MFL Challenge Cup.)		Total	
Club	Season	Division	Apps	Goals	Apps	Goals	Apps	Goals	Apps	Goals	Apps	Goals	Apps	Goals
Al-Shamal	2021–22	Qatar Stars League	11	3	—		1	0	—		—		12	3
Al-Shamal	2022–23	Qatar Stars League	20	3	—		1	0	—		—		21	3
Al-Shamal	2023–24	Qatar Stars League	12	3	—		—		—		—		12	3
Al-Khor (loan)	2023–24	Qatari Second Division	6	4	—		1	0	—		—		7	4
Al-Khor (loan)	Total		49	13	0	0	3	0	0	0	0	0	52	13
Selangor	2024–25	Malaysia Super League	10	2	—		1	0	6	1	2	2	19	5
Al-Karma	2025–26	Iraq Stars League	11	2	—		—		—		—		11	2
Al-Sailiya	2025–26	Qatar Stars League	2	0	—		—		—		—		2	0
Al-Sailiya	2026–27	Qatar Stars League	4	2	—		—		—		—		4	2
Al-Sailiya	Total		27	6	0	0	1	0	6	1	2	2	36	9
Career total			76	19	0	0	4	0	6	1	2	2	88	22

=== International ===
Appearances and goals by national team and year
National team	Year	Apps	Goals
Jordan	2024	15 (Note: Six appearances in the 2023 AFC Asian Cup, four appearances with four goals in the 2026 FIFA World Cup qualification second round, and five appearances with two goals in the 2026 FIFA World Cup qualification third round.)	6
Jordan	2025	12 (Note: Two appearances and three goals in the 2026 FIFA World Cup qualification third round. Six appearances and six goals in the 2025 FIFA Arab Cup.)	12
Jordan	2026	6 (Note: Two appearances and one goal in the 2026 FIFA World Cup.)	3
Total		31	19

Scores and results list Jordan's goal tally first.

List of international goals scored by Ali Olwan
No.	Date	Venue	Opponent	Score	Result	Competition
1.	4 September 2021	Bahrain National Stadium, Riffa, Bahrain	Bahrain	1–0	2–1	Friendly
2.	6 October 2021	Amman International Stadium, Amman, Jordan	Malaysia	1–0	4–0	Friendly
3.	6 October 2021	Amman International Stadium, Amman, Jordan	Malaysia	3–0	4–0	Friendly
4.	6 October 2021	Amman International Stadium, Amman, Jordan	Malaysia	4–0	4–0	Friendly
5.	28 January 2022	New York University Stadium, Abu Dhabi, United Arab Emirates	New Zealand	1–0	3–1	Friendly
6.	28 January 2022	New York University Stadium, Abu Dhabi, United Arab Emirates	New Zealand	3–1	3–1	Friendly
7.	8 June 2022	Jaber Al-Ahmad International Stadium, Kuwait City, Kuwait	Nepal	1–0	2–0	2023 AFC Asian Cup qualification
8.	14 June 2022	Jaber Al-Ahmad International Stadium, Kuwait City, Kuwait	Kuwait	1–0	3–0	2023 AFC Asian Cup qualification
9.	19 June 2023	Stadion Wiener Neustadt, Wiener Neustadt, Austria	Jamaica	2–1	2–1	Friendly
10.	5 January 2024	Thani bin Jassim Stadium, Al Rayyan, Qatar	Qatar	2–1	2–1	Friendly
11.	21 March 2024	Jinnah Sports Stadium, Islamabad, Pakistan	Pakistan	2–0	3–0	2026 FIFA World Cup qualification
12.	26 March 2024	Amman International Stadium, Amman, Jordan	Pakistan	5–0	7–0	2026 FIFA World Cup qualification
13.	6 June 2024	Amman International Stadium, Amman, Jordan	Tajikistan	1–0	3–0	2026 FIFA World Cup qualification
14.	11 June 2024	KSU Stadium, Riyadh, Saudi Arabia	Saudi Arabia	1–1	2–1	2026 FIFA World Cup qualification
15.	29 August 2024	Amman International Stadium, Amman, Jordan	North Korea	1–1	2–1	Friendly
16.	29 August 2024	Amman International Stadium, Amman, Jordan	North Korea	2–1	2–1	Friendly
17.	15 October 2024	Amman International Stadium, Amman, Jordan	Oman	2–0	4–0	2026 FIFA World Cup qualification
18.	15 October 2024	Amman International Stadium, Amman, Jordan	Oman	4–0	4–0	2026 FIFA World Cup qualification
19.	5 June 2025	Sultan Qaboos Sports Complex, Muscat, Oman	Oman	1–0	3–0	2026 FIFA World Cup qualification
20.	5 June 2025	Sultan Qaboos Sports Complex, Muscat, Oman	Oman	2–0	3–0	2026 FIFA World Cup qualification
21.	5 June 2025	Sultan Qaboos Sports Complex, Muscat, Oman	Oman	3–0	3–0	2026 FIFA World Cup qualification
22.	9 September 2025	Amman International Stadium, Amman, Jordan	Dominican Republic	1–0	3–0	Friendly
23.	14 October 2025	Arena Kombëtare, Tirana, Albania	Albania	2–4	2–4	Friendly
24.	3 December 2025	Al Bayt Stadium, Al Khor, Qatar	United Arab Emirates	1–0	1–2	2025 FIFA Arab Cup
25.	6 December 2025	Ahmad bin Ali Stadium, Al Rayyan, Qatar	Kuwait	3–1	3–1	2025 FIFA Arab Cup
26.	9 December 2025	Al Bayt Stadium, Al Khor, Qatar	Egypt	3–0	3–0	2025 FIFA Arab Cup
27.	12 December 2025	Education City Stadium, Al Rayyan, Qatar	Iraq	1–0	1–0	2025 FIFA Arab Cup
28.	18 December 2025	Lusail Stadium, Lusail, Qatar	Morocco	1–1	2–3	2025 FIFA Arab Cup
29.	18 December 2025	Lusail Stadium, Lusail, Qatar	Morocco	2–1	2–3	2025 FIFA Arab Cup
30.	16 June 2026	Levi's Stadium, Santa Clara, United States	Austria	1–1	1–3	2026 FIFA World Cup
31.	27 September 2026	King Abdullah II Stadium, Amman, Jordan	Syria	1–0	1–1	Friendly
32.	17 November 2026	Suheim bin Hamad Stadium, Doha, Qatar	Australia	2–0	2–0	Friendly

Hat-tricks
No.	Opponent	Goals	Score	Venue	Competition	Date
1	Malaysia	3 (1–0, 3–0, 4–0)	4–0	Amman International Stadium, Amman, Jordan	Friendly	6 October 2021
2	Oman	3 (1–0, 2–0, 3–0)	3–0	Sultan Qaboos Sports Complex, Muscat, Oman	2026 FIFA World Cup qualification	5 June 2025

== Honours ==
Selangor

- MFL Challenge Cup: 2024–25

Jordan

- AFC Asian Cup: runner-up 2023
- FIFA Arab Cup: runner-up 2025

Individual

- FIFA Arab Cup Golden Boot: 2025
