= 2025 FIFA Arab Cup =

11th Arab Cup, held in Qatar

كأس العرب 2025 Kaʾs al-ʿārab 2025

Tournament details
- Host country: Qatar
- Dates: 1–18 December
- Teams: 16 (from 2 confederations)
- Venues: 6 (in 4 host cities)

Final positions
- Champions: Morocco (2nd title)
- Runners-up: Jordan
- Third place: Saudi Arabia; United Arab Emirates (Note: After the first half ended 0–0, the match was abandoned before the resumption of the second half, following a decision of the referee, due to uncertain adverse weather conditions and the associated player welfare considerations. Later that day, FIFA declared the match a 0–0 draw and announced Saudi Arabia and the United Arab Emirates as joint third-place winners.)

Tournament statistics
- Matches played: 32
- Goals scored: 77 (2.41 per match)
- Attendance: 1,236,600 (38,644 per match)
- Top scorer(s): (Jordan) Ali Olwan (6 goals)
- Best player: (Morocco) Mohamed Rabie Hrimat
- Best goalkeeper: (Morocco) Mehdi Benabid
- Fair play award: Syria

The 2025 FIFA Arab Cup (Arabic: كأس العرب 2025) was the 11th edition of the Arab Cup, the Arab world's national team football tournament. It was the second edition under FIFA's jurisdiction, with previous editions having been organised by the Union of Arab Football Associations (UAFA). The tournament took place in Qatar from 1 to 18 December 2025. This was the third time that Qatar hosted the competition, following the 1998 and 2021 editions.

In the final, Morocco played Jordan on 18 December at the Lusail Stadium in Lusail. Morocco won the match 3–2 after extra time to claim their second Arab Cup.

== Teams ==
Of the 23 participating teams, the host nation Qatar, the title holders Algeria, and the remaining seven highest-ranked teams based on the April 2025 FIFA Ranking automatically qualified for the group stage. The remaining 14 teams played seven single-leg qualification matches, with the seven winners advancing to the group stage. In the group stage, there were four groups of four teams in a round-robin format, with the top two teams from each group qualifying for the knockout stage, which consisted of quarter-finals, semi-finals, a play-off for third place, and the final.

The 14 teams in the qualifiers were paired based on their April 2025 FIFA Ranking and consist of the seven lowest-ranked teams from both the AFC and the CAF. The highest-ranked AFC team played the lowest-ranked CAF team, the second-highest-ranked AFC team played the second-lowest-ranked CAF team, and so forth, creating seven inter-confederation matchups. The winners of qualification matches 1, 2, and 3 occupied positions 2, 3, and 4 in Pot 3 for the final tournament draw, while the winners of the remaining four matches were placed in Pot 4 in order.

Note: Parentheses show FIFA World Ranking (at the time of the draw) and confederation.

From the April 2025 FIFA World Ranking
Directly to the group stage (Ranked 1st to 9th)	Competing in the qualifiers (Ranked 10th to 23rd)
1. Qatar (55; AFC) (H); 2. Algeria (36; CAF) (TH); 3. Morocco (12; CAF); 4. Egypt (32; CAF); 5. Tunisia (49; CAF); 6. Saudi Arabia (58; AFC); 7. Iraq (59; AFC); 8. Jordan (62; AFC); 9. United Arab Emirates (65; AFC)	10. Oman (77; AFC); 11. Bahrain (84; AFC); 12. Syria (93; AFC); 13. Palestine (101; AFC); 14. Comoros (105; CAF); 15. Mauritania (110; CAF); 16. Lebanon (112; AFC); 17. Sudan (114; CAF); 18. Libya (117; CAF); 19. Kuwait (134; AFC); 20. Yemen (158; AFC); 21. South Sudan (170; CAF); 22. Djibouti (192; CAF); 23. Somalia (201; CAF)

== Draw ==
The group stage draw took place on 25 May 2025 at 20:00 AST (UTC+3) in at the Raffles Hotel in Doha, Qatar. It was conducted by Jaime Yarza, FIFA's director of tournaments, and four current and former players: Hassan Al-Haydos (Qatar), Rabah Madjer (Algeria), Yasser Al-Qahtani (Saudi Arabia), and Wael Gomaa (Egypt).

=== Method ===
The sixteen teams were drawn into four groups of four teams. The draw started with Pot 1 and ended with Pot 4, from where a team was drawn and assigned to the first available group in the position of their Pot (i.e. position 1 for Pot 1).

The hosts, Qatar, and the 2021 FIFA Arab Cup champions, Algeria, were automatically seeded into Pot 1 and assigned to position A1 and D1, respectively. The remaining automatically qualified teams were seeded into their respective Pots based on the FIFA World Ranking of April 2025 (shown below). The United Arab Emirates, the lowest-ranked team that automatically qualified, were joined in Pot 3 by the winners of qualification matches 1 to 3, while Pot 4 contained the winners of qualification matches 4 to 7.

Pot 1
Team	Rank
Qatar (H)	55
Algeria (DC)	36
Morocco	12
Egypt	32

Pot 2
Team	Rank
Tunisia	49
Saudi Arabia	58
Iraq	59
Jordan	62

Pot 3
Team	Rank
United Arab Emirates	65
Oman (qualification winner 1)	79
Bahrain (qualification winner 2)	91
Syria (qualification winner 3)	87

Pot 4
Team	Rank
Palestine (qualification winner 4)	96
Sudan (qualification winner 5)	118
Kuwait (qualification winner 6)	135
Comoros (qualification winner 7)	108

== Squads ==
The 16 national teams involved in the tournament were required to register a squad of 23 players, including three goalkeepers. Only players in these squads were eligible to take part in the tournament. The position listed for each player is per the official squad list published by FIFA on 21 November 2025. The age listed for each player is on 1 December 2025, the first day of the tournament.

== Match officials ==
On 14 October 2025, FIFA appointed 54 match officials from 23 member associations for the tournament. This included 14 referees, 28 assistant referees, and 12 video match officials.

Confederation	Referee	Assistant referees	Video assistant referee
AFC	(Qatar) Abdulrahman Al-Jassim	(Qatar) Taleb Al-Marri (Qatar) Saud Al-Maqaleh	(Saudi Arabia) Abdullah Al-Shehri (Qatar) Khamis Al-Marri (Japan) Jumpei Iida (Thailand) Sivakorn Pu-udom
AFC	(Oman) Ahmed Al-Kaf	(Oman) Abu Bakr Al-Amri (Oman) Rashid Al-Ghaiti	(Saudi Arabia) Abdullah Al-Shehri (Qatar) Khamis Al-Marri (Japan) Jumpei Iida (Thailand) Sivakorn Pu-udom
AFC	(China) Ma Ning	(China) Zhou Fei (China) Zhang Cheng	(Saudi Arabia) Abdullah Al-Shehri (Qatar) Khamis Al-Marri (Japan) Jumpei Iida (Thailand) Sivakorn Pu-udom
AFC	(Jordan) Adham Makhadmeh	(Jordan) Mohammad Al-Kalaf (Jordan) Ahmad Al-Roalle	(Saudi Arabia) Abdullah Al-Shehri (Qatar) Khamis Al-Marri (Japan) Jumpei Iida (Thailand) Sivakorn Pu-udom
CAF	(Gabon) Pierre Atcho	(Gabon) Boris Ditsoga (Gabon) Amos Abeigne Ndong	(Algeria) Lahlou Benbraham
CAF	(Egypt) Amin Omar	(Egypt) Mahmoud Abouregal (Egypt) Ahmed Ali	(Algeria) Lahlou Benbraham
CONCACAF	(Costa Rica) Juan Calderón	(Costa Rica) Juan Carlos Mora (Costa Rica) William Arrieta	(United States) Allen Chapman (Costa Rica) Benjamin Pineda
CONCACAF	(United States) Ismail Elfath	(United States) Corey Parker (United States) Kyle Atkins	(United States) Allen Chapman (Costa Rica) Benjamin Pineda
CONCACAF	(Guatemala) Mario Escobar	(Guatemala) Luis Ventura (Guatemala) Humberto Panjoj	(United States) Allen Chapman (Costa Rica) Benjamin Pineda
CONMEBOL	(Paraguay) Juan Gabriel Benítez	(Paraguay) Eduardo Cardozo (Paraguay) Milcíades Saldívar	(Uruguay) Antonio Garcia Noni (Brazil) Rodolpho Toski
CONMEBOL	(Chile) Cristián Garay	(Chile) Claudio Urrutia (Chile) José Retamal	(Uruguay) Antonio Garcia Noni (Brazil) Rodolpho Toski
OFC	(New Zealand) Campbell-Kirk Kawana-Waugh	(New Zealand) Isaac Trevis (New Zealand) Edward Cook	
UEFA	(Norway) Espen Eskås	(Norway) Jan Erik Engan (Norway) Isaak Bashevkin	(England) Jarred Gillett (Netherlands) Dennis Higler (Switzerland) Fedayi San
UEFA	(Sweden) Glenn Nyberg	(Sweden) Mahbod Beigi (Sweden) Andreas Söderkvist	(England) Jarred Gillett (Netherlands) Dennis Higler (Switzerland) Fedayi San

== Venues ==
On 24 May 2025, the organising committee announced the six venues that would host the tournament, all of which were used for the 2022 FIFA World Cup. Similarly to the aforementioned competition, Al Bayt Stadium hosted the opening game, with Lusail Stadium set to host the final.

Al Khor	Lusail (Doha Area)	Doha	Location of the host cities of the 2025 FIFA Arab Cup.
Al Bayt Stadium	Lusail Stadium	Stadium 974	Location of the host cities of the 2025 FIFA Arab Cup.
Capacity: 68,895	Capacity: 88,966	Capacity: 44,089	Location of the host cities of the 2025 FIFA Arab Cup.
Al Rayyan (Doha Area)			Stadiums of the 2025 FIFA Arab Cup in the Doha Area.
Ahmad bin Ali Stadium	Education City Stadium	Khalifa International Stadium	Stadiums of the 2025 FIFA Arab Cup in the Doha Area.
Capacity: 45,032	Capacity: 44,667	Capacity: 45,857	Stadiums of the 2025 FIFA Arab Cup in the Doha Area.

== Qualification ==
The 14 lowest-ranked teams in the April 2025 FIFA World Ranking met on 25 and 26 November in a single knockout match. The best-ranked AFC team met the lowest-ranked CAF team, the second-best AFC team played the second-lowest CAF team, and so on.

=== Summary ===
Team 1	Score	Team 2
Mauritania	0–2	Kuwait
Syria	2–0	South Sudan
Palestine	0–0 (4–3 p)	Libya
Oman	0–0 (4–1 p)	Somalia
Bahrain	1–0	Djibouti
Sudan	2–1	Lebanon
Comoros	4–4 (4–2 p)	Yemen

== Format ==
Of the 23 participating teams, the top nine teams based on the April 2025 FIFA World Ranking qualified directly to the group stage, while the remaining 14 teams played seven qualifying matches, of which seven qualified for the next stage. In the group stage, the teams were divided into four groups of four, with the two best teams from each group advancing to the quarter-finals.

=== Tiebreakers ===
The ranking of teams in the group stage was determined as follows:

1. Points obtained in all group matches (three for a win, one for a draw, none for a defeat);
2. Points obtained in matches between the teams concerned;
3. Goal difference in matches between the teams concerned;
4. Goals scored in matches between the teams concerned;
5. Goal difference in all group matches;
6. Goals scored in all group matches;
7. Fair play points in all group matches (only one deduction per player per match):
  - Yellow card: −1 point;
  - Indirect red card (second yellow): −3 points;
  - Direct red card: −4 points;
  - Yellow card and direct red card: −5 points;
8. Latest FIFA Men's World Ranking.

The knockout stage included all stages from the quarter-finals to the final match. The winner of each match advanced to the next stage and the loser was eliminated. The losing teams of the semi-finals played the match for third place. In the final match, the winner lifted the Arab Cup. In all final cases, if the match ended in a tie, then extra time was played. If the score was still level after extra time, it was decided by a penalty shoot-out.

=== Schedule ===
All times are local, AST (UTC+3).

Match	Dates
Group stage
Matchday 1	1–3 December 2025
Matchday 2	4–6 December 2025
Matchday 3	7–9 December 2025
Knockout stage
Quarter-finals	11–12 December 2025
Semi-finals	15 December 2025
Third place play-off	18 December 2025
Final	18 December 2025

== Group stage ==
=== Group A ===
Pos	Team	Pld	W	D	L	GF	GA	GD	Pts	Qualification
1	Palestine	3	1	2	0	3	2	+1	5	Advance to knockout stage
2	Syria	3	1	2	0	2	1	+1	5	Advance to knockout stage
3	Tunisia	3	1	1	1	5	3	+2	4	
4	Qatar (H)	3	0	1	2	1	5	−4	1	

Source: FIFA
Rules for classification: Tiebreakers
(H) Hosts
1 December 2025
16:00

Tunisia	0–1	Syria
	Report	Khribin 48'

Ahmad bin Ali Stadium, Al Rayyan
Attendance: 26,966
Referee: Juan Gabriel Calderón (Costa Rica)
1 December 2025
18:45

Qatar	0–1	Palestine
	Report	Al-Brake 90+5' (o.g.)

Al Bayt Stadium, Al Khor
Attendance: 61,475
Referee: Glenn Nyberg (Sweden)

4 December 2025
17:30

Palestine	2–2	Tunisia
Hamdan 61'; Qunbar 85'	Report	Layouni 16'; Chaouat 51'

Lusail Stadium, Lusail
Attendance: 44,548
Referee: Ismail Elfath (United States)
4 December 2025
20:00

Syria	1–1	Qatar
Khribin 90'	Report	Alaaeldin 77'

Khalifa International Stadium, Al Rayyan
Attendance: 42,467
Referee: Mario Escobar (Guatemala)

7 December 2025
20:00

Qatar	0–3	Tunisia
	Report	Ben Romdhane 16'; Meriah 62'; Ben Ali 90+4'

Al Bayt Stadium, Al Khor
Attendance: 48,151
Referee: Espen Eskås (Norway)
7 December 2025
20:00

Syria	0–0	Palestine
	Report

Education City Stadium, Al Rayyan
Attendance: 39,571
Referee: Ahmed Al-Kaf (Oman)

=== Group B ===
Pos	Team	Pld	W	D	L	GF	GA	GD	Pts	Qualification
1	Morocco	3	2	1	0	4	1	+3	7	Advance to knockout stage
2	Saudi Arabia	3	2	0	1	5	3	+2	6	Advance to knockout stage
3	Oman	3	1	1	1	3	3	0	4	
4	Comoros	3	0	0	3	3	8	−5	0	

Source: FIFA
Rules for classification: Tiebreakers
2 December 2025
15:00

Morocco	3–1	Comoros
Bouftini 5'; Tissoudali 11'; El Berkaoui 45+4'	Report	Boulacsoute 56' (o.g.)

Khalifa International Stadium, Al Rayyan
Attendance: 10,246
Referee: Ma Ning (China)
2 December 2025
20:00

Saudi Arabia	2–1	Oman
Al-Buraikan 55'; Al-Shehri 77'	Report	Al-Habashi 70'

Education City Stadium, Al Rayyan
Attendance: 21,628
Referee: Adham Makhadmeh (Jordan)

5 December 2025
17:30

Oman	0–0	Morocco
	Report

Education City Stadium, Al Rayyan
Attendance: 37,996
Referee: Juan Gabriel Benítez (Paraguay)
5 December 2025
21:30

Comoros	1–3	Saudi Arabia
Djoudja 63'	Report	Kanno 45+4', 51'; S. Al-Dawsari 76'

Al Bayt Stadium, Al Khor
Attendance: 32,219
Referee: Juan Gabriel Calderón (Costa Rica)

8 December 2025
20:00

Morocco	1–0	Saudi Arabia
El Berkaoui 11'	Report

Lusail Stadium, Lusail
Attendance: 78,131
Referee: Mario Escobar (Guatemala)
8 December 2025
20:00

Oman	2–1	Comoros
Al-Sabhi 30', 43'	Report	Hamidou 68'

Stadium 974, Doha
Attendance: 9,348
Referee: Pierre Atcho (Gabon)

=== Group C ===
Pos	Team	Pld	W	D	L	GF	GA	GD	Pts	Qualification
1	Jordan	3	3	0	0	8	2	+6	9	Advance to knockout stage
2	United Arab Emirates	3	1	1	1	5	4	+1	4	Advance to knockout stage
3	Egypt	3	0	2	1	2	5	−3	2	
4	Kuwait	3	0	1	2	3	7	−4	1	

Source: FIFA
Rules for classification: Tiebreakers
2 December 2025
17:30

Egypt	1–1	Kuwait
Afsha 88' (pen.)	Report	Al Hajeri 64'

Lusail Stadium, Lusail
Attendance: 24,632
Referee: Espen Eskås (Norway)
3 December 2025
20:00

Jordan	2–1	United Arab Emirates
Olwan 20' (pen.); Al-Naimat 63'	Report	Bruno 47'

Al Bayt Stadium, Al Khor
Attendance: 30,759
Referee: Ahmed Al-Kaf (Oman)

6 December 2025
14:00

Kuwait	1–3	Jordan
Nasser 84'	Report	Abu Taha 17'; Al-Rosan 49'; Olwan 90+7' (pen.)

Ahmad bin Ali Stadium, Al Rayyan
Attendance: 35,933
Referee: Cristián Garay (Chile)
6 December 2025
21:30

United Arab Emirates	1–1	Egypt
Caio 60'	Report	Hamdy 85'

Lusail Stadium, Lusail
Attendance: 36,299
Referee: Glenn Nyberg (Sweden)

9 December 2025
17:30

Egypt	0–3	Jordan
	Report	Abu Hashish 19'; Abu Zrayq 41'; Olwan 90+2' (pen.)

Al Bayt Stadium, Al Khor
Attendance: 55,658
Referee: Ismail Elfath (United States)
9 December 2025
17:30

United Arab Emirates	3–1	Kuwait
Al-Ghassani 16' (pen.), 18'; Giménez 66'	Report	Al-Hajeri 59'

Stadium 974, Doha
Attendance: 15,357
Referee: Ma Ning (China)

=== Group D ===
Pos	Team	Pld	W	D	L	GF	GA	GD	Pts	Qualification
1	Algeria	3	2	1	0	7	1	+6	7	Advance to knockout stage
2	Iraq	3	2	0	1	4	3	+1	6	Advance to knockout stage
3	Bahrain	3	1	0	2	5	8	−3	3	
4	Sudan	3	0	1	2	1	5	−4	1	

Source: FIFA
Rules for classification: Tiebreakers
3 December 2025
15:00

Algeria	0–0	Sudan
	Report

Ahmad bin Ali Stadium, Al Rayyan
Attendance: 37,143
Referee: Amin Omar (Egypt)
3 December 2025
17:30

Iraq	2–1	Bahrain
Lutfalla 10' (o.g.); M. Ali 25'	Report	Hashim 79'

Stadium 974, Doha
Attendance: 9,358
Referee: Pierre Atcho (Gabon)

6 December 2025
16:30

Bahrain	1–5	Algeria
Abduljabbar 27'	Report	Berkane 24', 48'; Boulbina 30', 80'; Benzia 45+7' (pen.)

Khalifa International Stadium, Al Rayyan
Attendance: 20,260
Referee: Campbell-Kirk Kawana-Waugh (New Zealand)
6 December 2025
19:00

Sudan	0–2	Iraq
	Report	M. Ali 81'; Attwan 84'

Stadium 974, Doha
Attendance: 38,639
Referee: Adham Makhadmeh (Jordan)

9 December 2025
20:00

Algeria	2–0	Iraq
Tougai 45+1'; Natiq 46' (o.g.)	Report

Khalifa International Stadium, Al Rayyan
Attendance: 34,148
Referee: Abdulrahman Al-Jassim (Qatar)
9 December 2025
20:00

Bahrain	3–1	Sudan
Abduljabbar 37'; Al-Romaihi 79' (pen.); Al-Humaidan 89'	Report	Muzmel 72'

Education City Stadium, Al Rayyan
Attendance: 21,386
Referee: Juan Gabriel Benítez (Paraguay)

== Knockout stage ==
The knockout stage was the second and final stage of the tournament, after the group stage. It began on 11 December with the quarter-finals and ended on 18 December following the final match that was held at Lusail Stadium in Lusail. The best two teams from each group (8 in total) advanced to the knockout stage to compete in a singles-elimination tournament. A match for third place was scheduled to be played between the two losing teams in the semi-finals.

If the match was level at the end of the original playing time, two halves of extra time were played (15 minutes each) and followed, if necessary, by a penalty shoot-out to determine the winners. Below is an arc for the knockout stage of the tournament. Teams in bold indicate the winners of the match.

=== Bracket ===
Quarter-finals
11 December – Lusail
Palestine	1
**Saudi Arabia (a.e.t.)**	**2**
12 December – Al Rayyan (ECS)
**Jordan**	**1**
Iraq	0
11 December – Al Rayyan (KIS)
**Morocco**	**1**
Syria	0
12 December – Al Khor
Algeria	1 (6)
**United Arab Emirates (p)**	**1 (7)**

Semi-finals
15 December – Al Khor
Saudi Arabia	0
**Jordan**	**1**
15 December – Al Rayyan (KIS)
**Morocco**	**3**
United Arab Emirates	0

Final
18 December – Lusail
Jordan	2
**Morocco (a.e.t.)**	**3**
Third place play-off
18 December – Al Rayyan (KIS)
Saudi Arabia	—
United Arab Emirates	—

=== Quarter-finals ===
11 December 2025
17:30

Morocco	1–0	Syria
Azaro 79'	Report

Khalifa International Stadium, Al Rayyan
Attendance: 39,167
Referee: Cristián Garay (Chile)

11 December 2025
20:30

Palestine	1–2 (a.e.t.)	Saudi Arabia
Dabbagh 64'	Report	Al-Buraikan 58' (pen.); Kanno 115'

Lusail Stadium, Lusail
Attendance: 77,197
Referee: Amin Omar (Egypt)

12 December 2025
17:30

Jordan	1–0	Iraq
Olwan 41' (pen.)	Report

Education City Stadium, Al Rayyan
Attendance: 43,486
Referee: Espen Eskås (Norway)

12 December 2025
20:30

Algeria	1–1 (a.e.t.)	United Arab Emirates
Boulbina 46'	Report	Bruno 64'
Penalties
Brahimi (penalty scored); Benzia (penalty missed); Mrezigue (penalty scored); Ounas (penalty scored); Boulbina (penalty scored); Halaïmia (penalty scored); Draoui (penalty scored); Khacef (penalty missed)	6–7	(penalty scored) Caio; (penalty missed) Meloni; (penalty scored) Saleh; (penalty scored) Pimenta; (penalty scored) Faiz; (penalty scored) Adil; (penalty scored) Autonne; (penalty scored) Akonnor

Al Bayt Stadium, Al Khor
Attendance: 50,424
Referee: Adham Makhadmeh (Jordan)

=== Semi-finals ===
15 December 2025
17:30

Morocco	3–0	United Arab Emirates
El Berkaoui 28'; El Mahdioui 83'; Hamdallah 90+2'	Report

Khalifa International Stadium, Al Rayyan
Attendance: 33,898
Referee: Espen Eskås (Norway)

15 December 2025
20:30

Saudi Arabia	0–1	Jordan
	Report	Al-Rashdan 66'

Al Bayt Stadium, Al Khor
Attendance: 62,825
Referee: Juan Gabriel Benítez (Paraguay)

=== Third place play-off ===
18 December 2025
14:00

Saudi Arabia	0–0 Abandoned	United Arab Emirates
	Report

Khalifa International Stadium, Al Rayyan
Attendance: 32,768
Referee: Cristián Garay (Chile)

=== Final ===
18 December 2025
19:00

Jordan	2–3 (a.e.t.)	Morocco
Olwan 48', 68' (pen.)	Report	Tannane 4'; Hamdallah 88', 100'

Lusail Stadium, Lusail
Attendance: 84,517
Referee: Glenn Nyberg (Sweden)

== Statistics ==
=== Goalscorers ===
There were 77 goals scored in 31 matches, for an average of 2.48 goals per match.

6 goals

- (Jordan national football team) Ali Olwan

3 goals

- (Algeria national football team) Adil Boulbina
- (Morocco national football team) Karim El Berkaoui
- (Morocco national football team) Abderrazak Hamdallah
- (Saudi Arabia national football team) Mohamed Kanno

2 goals

- (Algeria national football team) Redouane Berkane
- (Bahrain national football team) Mahdi Abduljabbar
- (Iraq national football team) Mohanad Ali
- (Kuwait national football team) Fahad Al Hajeri
- (Oman national football team) Issam Al-Sabhi
- (Saudi Arabia national football team) Firas Al-Buraikan
- (Syria national football team) Omar Khribin
- (United Arab Emirates national football team) Yahya Al-Ghassani
- (United Arab Emirates national football team) Bruno

1 goal

- (Algeria national football team) Mohamed Amine Tougai
- (Algeria national football team) Yassine Benzia
- (Bahrain national football team) Mahdi Al-Humaidan
- (Bahrain national football team) Mohamed Al-Romaihi
- (Bahrain national football team) Hashim Sayed Isa
- (Comoros national football team) Ibroihim Djoudja
- (Comoros national football team) Nassuir Hamidou
- (Egypt national football team) Afsha
- (Egypt national football team) Marwan Hamdy
- (Iraq national football team) Amjad Attwan
- (Jordan national football team) Mohammad Abu Hashish
- (Jordan national football team) Mohannad Abu Taha
- (Jordan national football team) Mohammad Abu Zrayq
- (Jordan national football team) Yazan Al-Naimat
- (Jordan national football team) Nizar Al-Rashdan
- (Jordan national football team) Saed Al-Rosan
- (Kuwait national football team) Yousef Nasser
- (Morocco national football team) Walid Azarou
- (Morocco national football team) Soufiane Bouftini
- (Morocco national football team) Aschraf El Mahdioui
- (Morocco national football team) Oussama Tannane
- (Morocco national football team) Tarik Tissoudali
- (Oman national football team) Ghanim Al-Habashi
- (Palestine national football team) Oday Dabbagh
- (Palestine national football team) Hamed Hamdan
- (Palestine national football team) Zaid Qunbar
- (Qatar national football team) Ahmed Alaaeldin
- (Saudi Arabia national football team) Salem Al-Dawsari
- (Saudi Arabia national football team) Saleh Al-Shehri
- (Sudan national football team) Yaser Muzamel
- (Tunisia national football team) Mohamed Ali Ben Romdhane
- (Tunisia national football team) Mohamed Ben Ali
- (Tunisia national football team) Firas Chaouat
- (Tunisia national football team) Amor Layouni
- (Tunisia national football team) Yassine Meriah
- (United Arab Emirates national football team) Nicolas Giménez
- (United Arab Emirates national football team) Caio Lucas

1 own goal

- (Bahrain national football team) Ebrahim Lutfalla (against Iraq)
- (Iraq national football team) Saad Natiq (against Algeria)
- (Morocco national football team) Mohamed Boulacsoute (against Comoros)
- (Qatar national football team) Sultan Al-Brake (against Palestine)

== Awards ==
The following awards were given at the conclusion of the tournament. They were all sponsored by Adidas, except for the FIFA Fair Play Trophy.

Golden Ball
(Morocco) Mohamed Rabie Hrimat
Golden Boot
(Jordan) Ali Olwan
(6 goals)
Golden Glove
(Morocco) Mehdi Benabid
FIFA Fair Play Award
Syria

=== Team of the Tournament ===
The Team of the Tournament was as follows:

Goalkeeper	Defenders	Midfielders	Forwards
(Morocco) Mehdi Benabid	(Saudi Arabia) Hassan Al-Tambakti (Morocco) Soufiane Bouftini (Morocco) Marwane Saâdane (Jordan) Mohannad Abu Taha	(Saudi Arabia) Mohamed Kanno (Morocco) Mohamed Rabie Hrimat (United Arab Emirates) Nicolás Giménez	(Jordan) Ali Olwan (Saudi Arabia) Salem Al-Dawsari (Morocco) Karim El Berkaoui

== Final ranking ==
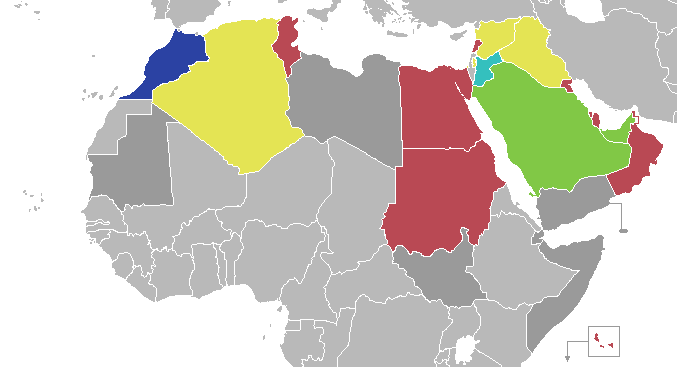
Champion Runner-up Third place Quarter-finals Group stage Qualification stage

The final ranking of the tournament is reported below.

R	Team	Grp	Pld	W	D*	L	GF	GA	GD	Pts.
1	Morocco	B	6	5	1	0	11	3	+8	16
2	Jordan	C	6	5	0	1	12	5	+7	15
3	Saudi Arabia	B	5	3	0	2	7	5	+2	9
3	United Arab Emirates	C	5	1	2	2	6	8	–2	5
Eliminated in the quarter-finals
5	Algeria	D	4	2	2	0	8	2	+6	8
6	Iraq	D	4	2	0	2	4	4	0	6
7	Palestine	A	4	1	2	1	4	4	0	5
8	Syria	A	4	1	2	1	2	2	0	5
Eliminated in the group stage
9	Tunisia	A	3	1	1	1	5	3	+2	4
10	Oman	B	3	1	1	1	3	3	0	4
11	Bahrain	D	3	1	0	2	5	8	−3	3
12	Egypt	C	3	0	2	1	2	5	−3	2
13	Kuwait	C	3	0	1	2	3	7	−4	1
14	Qatar	A	3	0	1	2	1	5	−4	1
15	Sudan	D	3	0	1	2	1	5	−4	1
16	Comoros	B	3	0	0	3	3	8	−5	0

As per statistical convention in football, matches decided in extra time are counted as wins and losses, while matches decided by penalty shoot-outs are counted as draws.

== Marketing ==
=== Mascot ===
The official mascot of the 2025 FIFA Arab Cup was based on the folk character Juha.

=== Broadcasting rights ===
Country/Region	Broadcaster	Ref.
Qatar	beIN Sports	
Qatar	Alkass	
Kuwait	Shasha	
Kuwait	Kuwait TV (Sport channel)	
United Arab Emirates	AD Sports	
United Arab Emirates	Dubai Sports	
Algeria	EPTV	
Oman	Oman Sports TV	
Saudi Arabia	MBC 1	
Saudi Arabia	KSA Sport (Only Saudi Arabian team)	
South Korea	JTBC	

=== Sponsorship ===
FIFA Arab Cup sponsors	Regional supporters
Adidas; Coca-Cola; Jetour; Qatar Airways; Visit Qatar	Alkass Sports Channels; Aspetar; Media City Qatar; Qatar International Islamic Bank; Vodafone
