= Anas Bach =

Moroccan professional footballer

Personal information
- Date of birth: 10 February 1998 (age 28)
- Place of birth: Tarfaya, Morocco
- Height: 1.78 m (5 ft 10 in)
- Position: Right back

Senior career*
Years	Team	Apps	(Gls)
2019–2024	FUS Rabat	77	(2)
2024–	AS FAR	50	(5)

International career
2025–	Morocco	10	(0)
Medal record
Representing Morocco
Men's football
FIFA Arab Cup
Winner	2025 Qatar	Team
- * Club domestic league appearances and goals as of 14:55, 28 December 2022 (UTC)

Anas Bach (Arabic: أنس باش; born 10 February 1998) is a Moroccan professional footballer who plays as a defender for AS FAR and the Morocco national team.

== Honours ==
AS FAR

- CAF Champions League runner-up: 2025–26

Morocco A'

- African Nations Championship: 2024
- FIFA Arab Cup: 2025
