= Issam Smeeri =

Jordanian footballer

Personal information
- Full name: Issam Salem Mohammad Smeeri
- Date of birth: 30 May 1999 (age 27)
- Place of birth: Irbid, Jordan
- Height: 1.68 m (5 ft 6 in)
- Position: Right-back

Team information
- Current team: Al-Salt
- Number: 12

Youth career
- 2015–2017: Al-Riffa

Senior career*
Years	Team	Apps	(Gls)
2017–2019	Al-Riffa	40	(5)
2019–2021	Shabab Al-Aqaba	38	(4)
2022	Sahab		
2023	Al-Hidd		
2023–2024	Al-Salt		
2024–2025	Manama	22	
2025–	Al-Salt	18	(0)

International career^{‡}
2017	Jordan U20	8	(0)
2021	Jordan U23	10	(0)
2025–	Jordan	7	(0)
Medal record
Representing Jordan
Men's football
FIFA Arab Cup
Runner-up	2025 Qatar	Team
- * Club domestic league appearances and goals as of 7 May 2026 ‡ National team caps and goals as of 15 December 2025

Issam Salem Mohammad Smeeri (Arabic: عصام سميري, born 30 May 1999) is a Jordanian footballer who plays as a right-back for Jordanian Pro League club ||Al Arabi|| and the Jordan national team.

== Club career ==
=== Early career ===
Born in Irbid, Smeeri grew up in Bahrain at Al-Riffa's youth set-up, where he went through all the youth categories winning four championships at youth level, before earning himself a first team spot.

=== Al-Riffa ===
Smeeri won three trophies at Al-Riffa including the King's Cup and the Nasser bin Hamad Professional League and the Bahraini Super Cup.

=== Shabab Al-Aqaba ===
Smeeri joined Jordanian Pro League club Shabab Al-Aqaba during which he provided good levels that qualified him to play at Jordan U23.

=== Manama ===
Several clubs around the Jordanian Pro League showed interest in Smeeri, after expiring his contract at Al-Salt However, he returned to Bahrain to join Manama. He contributed to 7 goals in 22 matches for the club.

=== Return to Al-Salt ===
Despite receiving local and external offers, Smeeri decided to return to the Jordanian Pro League and reunite with Al-Salt on a two-season contract, in order to be managed under Haitham Al-Shboul, as well as have an opportunity to play for the national team ahead of the 2025 FIFA Arab Cup and the 2026 FIFA World Cup.

== International career ==
On 24 August 2025, Smeeri was called up to the Jordan national team to participate in friendly matches against Russia and Dominican Republic, becoming one of four players to enter the national team for the first time.

== Playing style ==
Smeeri is known for his crosses and offensive contributions at his position.
