= Lusail Stadium =

Stadium in Lusail, Qatar

- استاد لوسيل (Arabic)
- Interactive map of Lusail Stadium
- Location: Lusail, Qatar
- Coordinates: 25°25′15.1″N 51°29′25.4″E
- Capacity: 88,966
- Record attendance: 88,966 (Argentina vs Mexico, 26 November 2022, Argentina vs Croatia, 13 December 2022, and Argentina vs France, 18 December 2022)
- Public transit: Lusail (لوسيل)

Construction
- Groundbreaking: 11 April 2017; 9 years ago
- Built: 2017–2021
- Opened: 21 November 2021; 4 years ago
- Architects: Foster + Partners, Populous
- General contractors: HBK Contracting, China Railway Construction Corporation

Tenant
- Qatar national football team (2022–present)

Lusail Stadium (Arabic: استاد لوسيل, ALA-LC: Istād Lūsayl) is a football stadium in Lusail, Qatar. Owned by the Qatar Football Association, it is the largest stadium in Qatar and the Middle East by capacity; one of eight stadiums built for the 2022 FIFA World Cup, it hosted the 2022 FIFA World Cup final game between Argentina and France on 18 December 2022. As of 2022 it was the second largest football stadium in Asia, with a plan to eventually reduce capacity from 88,966 to 40,000. However, as of December 2025 this has yet to happen.

The stadium is located about 20 kilometres (12 mi) north of Doha, in the city of Lusail. Lusail Stadium was inaugurated on 9 September 2022 with the Lusail Super Cup game.

== Construction ==
Lusail Stadium under construction in 2020

The Procurement process for the stadium conversion began in 2014. The stadium was built as a joint venture by HBK Contracting and the China Railway Construction Corporation.

Like the other stadiums that planned the 2022 World Cup, the Lusail Stadium is cooled using solar power and is claimed to have zero carbon footprint.

Construction began on 11 April 2017. Completion of the stadium was originally scheduled for 2020. It was then to host three friendly matches until the 2022 World Cup, but as the completion of the stadium was postponed, it is subsequently hosting 10 games including the final.

Following the World Cup, it is expected to be reconfigured into a 40,000-seat stadium. Excess seating will be removed and other parts of the building repurposed as a community space with shops, cafés, athletic and education facilities, and a health clinic.

Like other stadiums constructed for the 2022 FIFA World Cup, Lusail Stadium received a five-star rating on 16 August 2022 for its design and construction from the GSAS.

A 2021 investigation by The Guardian revealed that over 6,500 migrant workers from Bangladesh, India, Pakistan, Nepal and Sri Lanka died between 2010 and 2020 during construction of World Cup venues in Qatar. The figures used by The Guardian did not include occupation or place of work so deaths could not be definitively associated with the World Cup construction programme. Commenting on the investigation, Construction News recalled a 2014 BBC Newsnight investigation that claimed migrant workers were being forced to work in unsafe conditions and had wages withheld; nearly half of the deaths of Nepalese workers on the World Cup construction programme were blamed on heart attacks to avoid compensation payments.

== Hosted events ==
=== Lusail Super Cup ===
On 9 September 2022, the Lusail Stadium hosted the Saudi-Egyptian Super Cup, a tournament that served as a rehearsal for the World Cup finals, held between the two teams of Al Hilal, the 2021–22 Saudi Arabian champion, and Zamalek, the 2021–22 Egyptian champion, in front of 77,575 fans. The two sides played out 1–1 draw, with Al Hilal triumphing 4–1 after a penalty shootout.

=== 2022 FIFA World Cup ===
The Lusail Stadium hosted ten matches during the 2022 FIFA World Cup, including the final.

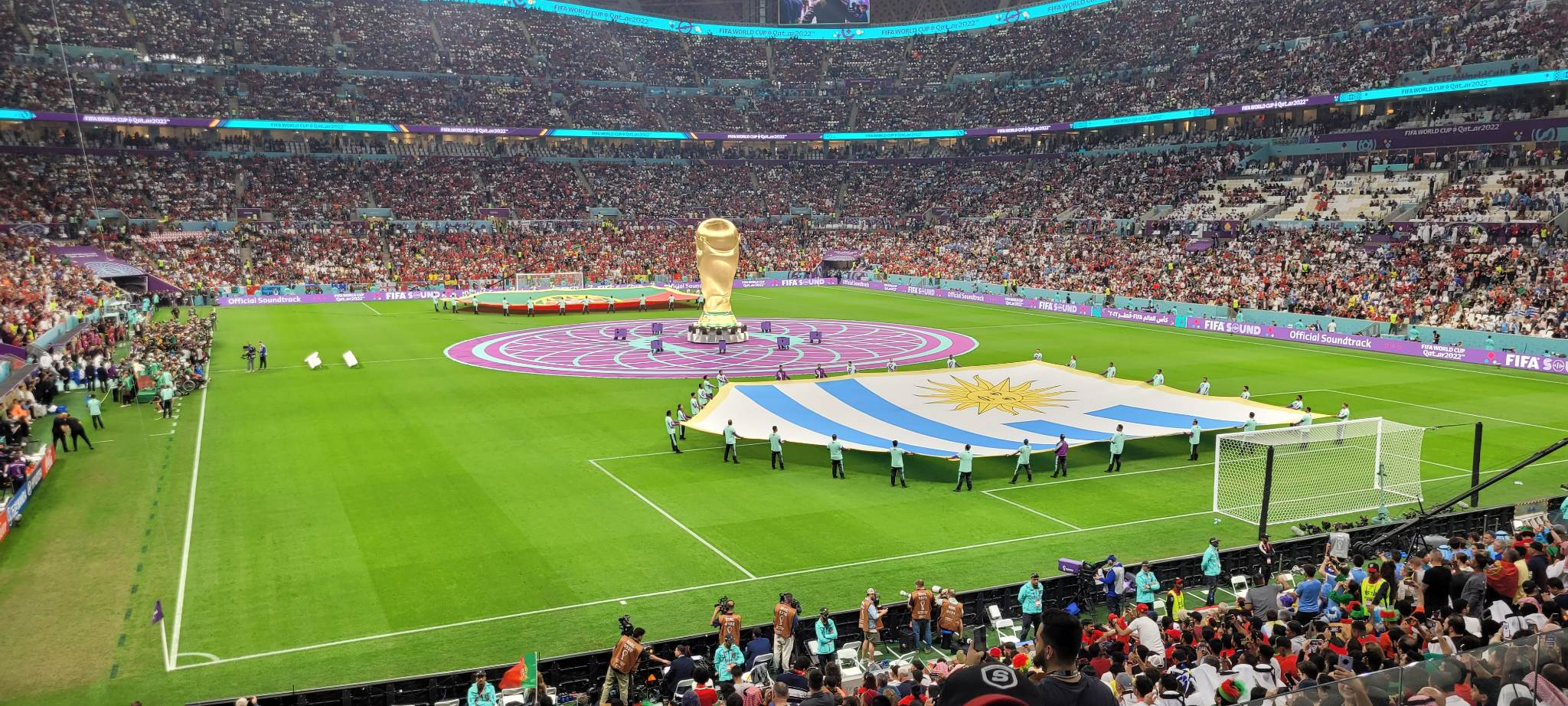
The stadium before the Portugal vs Uruguay match

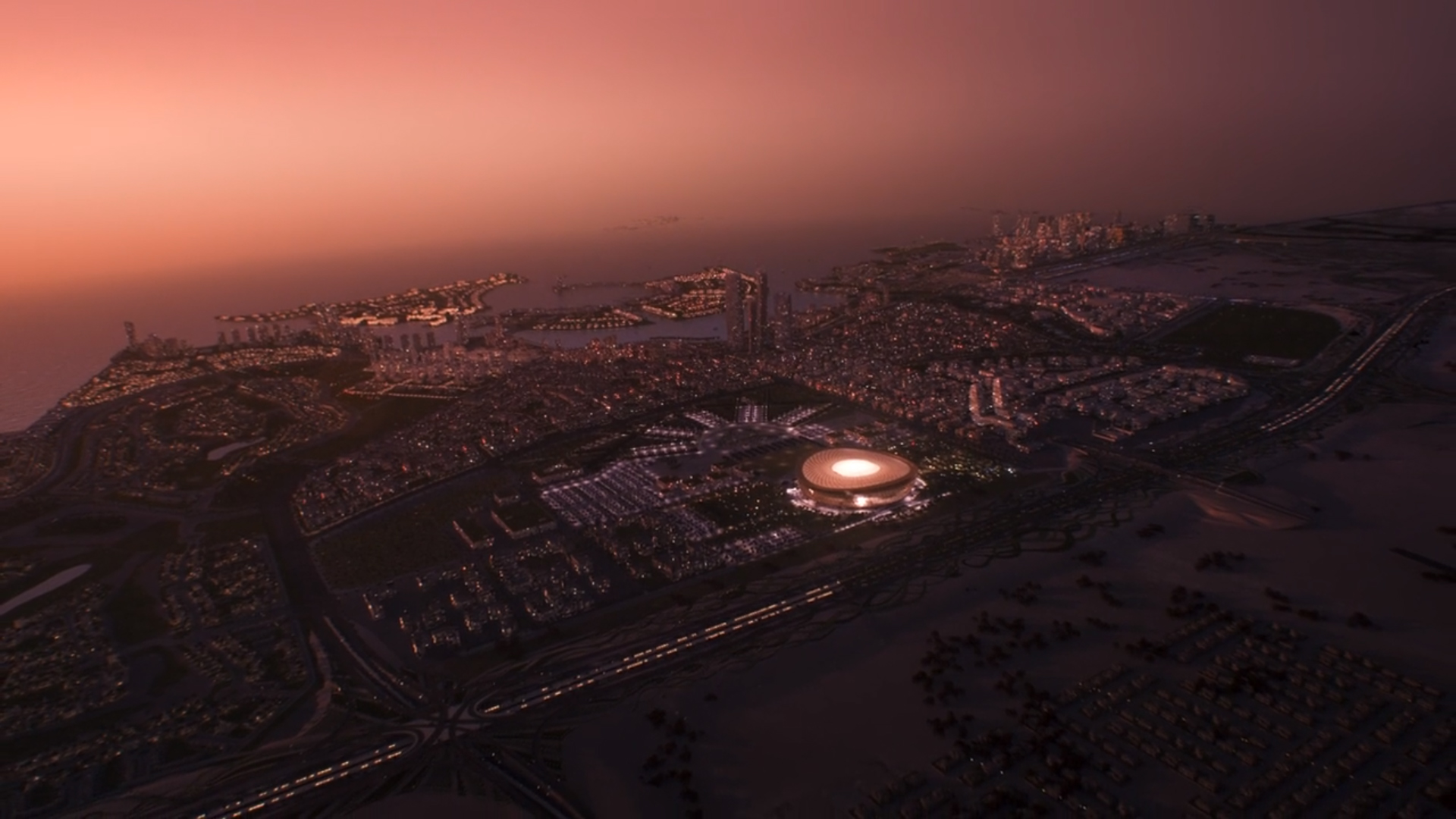
A rendering of Lusail Stadium and its surroundings

Date	Local time	Team No. 1	Result	Team No. 2	Round	Attendance
22 November 2022	13:00	Argentina	1–2	Saudi Arabia	Group C	88,012
24 November 2022	22:00	Brazil	2–0	Serbia	Group G	88,103
26 November 2022	22:00	Argentina	2–0	Mexico	Group C	88,966
28 November 2022	22:00	Portugal	2–0	Uruguay	Group H	88,668
30 November 2022	22:00	Saudi Arabia	1–2	Mexico	Group C	84,985
2 December 2022	22:00	Cameroon	1–0	Brazil	Group G	85,986
6 December 2022	22:00	Portugal	6–1	Switzerland	Round of 16	83,268
9 December 2022	22:00	Netherlands	2–2 (a.e.t.) (3–4 p)	Argentina	Quarter-finals	88,235
13 December 2022	22:00	Argentina	3–0	Croatia	Semi-finals	88,966
18 December 2022	18:00	Argentina	3–3 (a.e.t.) (4–2 p)	France	Final	88,966

=== 2023 AFC Asian Cup ===
The Lusail Stadium hosted the opening match and the final of the 2023 AFC Asian Cup.

Date	Local time	Team No. 1	Result	Team No. 2	Round	Attendance
12 January 2024	19:00	Qatar	3–0	Lebanon	Group A	82,490
10 February 2024	18:00	Jordan	1–3	Qatar	Final	86,492

=== 2024 FIFA Intercontinental Cup ===
The Lusail Stadium hosted the final of the 2024 FIFA Intercontinental Cup.

Date	Local time	Team No. 1	Result	Team No. 2	Round	Attendance
18 December 2024	21:00	(Spain) Real Madrid	3–0	(Mexico) Pachuca	Final	67,249

=== 2025 FIFA Arab Cup ===
The Lusail Stadium hosted six matches including the final of the 2025 FIFA Arab Cup.

Date	Local time	Team No. 1	Result	Team No. 2	Round	Attendance
2 December 2025	17:30	Egypt	1–1	Kuwait	Group C	24,632
4 December 2025	17:30	Palestine	2–2	Tunisia	Group A	44,548
6 December 2025	21:30	United Arab Emirates	1–1	Egypt	Group C	36,299
8 December 2025	20:00	Morocco	1–0	Saudi Arabia	Group B	78,131
11 December 2025	20:30	Palestine	1–2 (a.e.t.)	Saudi Arabia	Quarter-finals	77,197
18 December 2025	19:00	Jordan	2–3 (a.e.t.)	Morocco	Final	84,517

=== 2026 Finalissima ===
The Lusail Stadium was the planned host for the 2026 Finalissima, a match between Spain, winners of UEFA Euro 2024, and Argentina, winners of the 2024 Copa América. On March 27, 2026, UEFA announced the cancellation of the match due to safety concerns over the ongoing war in the region.

Date	Local time	Team No. 1	Result	Team No. 2	Round	Attendance
27 March 2026	21:00	Spain	Cancelled	Argentina	Final	N/A

== See also ==
- Lusail Sports Arena, Lusail, Qatar
- Lists of stadiums

Events and tenants
Preceded by Luzhniki Stadium; Moscow	FIFA World Cup; Final venue 2022	Succeeded by MetLife Stadium; East Rutherford
Preceded by Zayed Sports City Stadium; Abu Dhabi	AFC Asian Cup; Opening match venue 2023	Succeeded by King Fahd Sports City Stadium; Riyadh
Preceded by Zayed Sports City Stadium; Abu Dhabi	AFC Asian Cup; Final venue 2023	Succeeded by King Fahd Sports City Stadium; Riyadh
