= Ali Hajabi =

Jordanian footballer

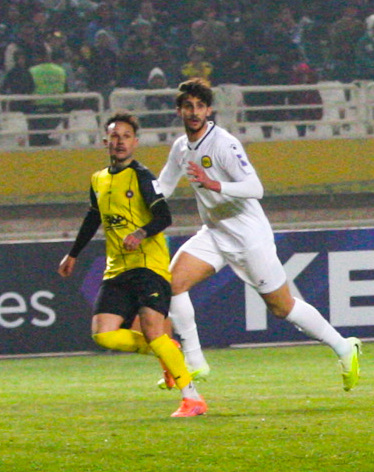
- Hajabi with Al-Hussein in 2025

Personal information
- Full name: Ali Ahmad Asad Hajabi
- Date of birth: 2 May 2004 (age 22)
- Place of birth: Jordan
- Height: 1.91 m (6 ft 3 in)
- Positions: Left-back; center-back

Team information
- Current team: Al-Hussein
- Number: 33

Youth career
- –2024: Al-Ahli

Senior career*
| Years | Team | Apps | (Gls) |
| 2024 | Al-Ahli | | |
| 2024– | Al-Hussein | 25 | (1) |

International career^{‡}
| 2019 | Jordan U17 | | |
| 2023 | Jordan U20 | 4 | (0) |
| 2025– | Jordan U23 | 7 | (0) |
| 2025– | Jordan | 6 | (0) |
Medal record
Representing Jordan
Men's football
FIFA Arab Cup
| Runner-up | 2025 Qatar | Team |
- * Club domestic league appearances and goals as of 8 May 2026 ‡ National team caps and goals as of 16 January 2026

Ali Ahmad Asad Hajabi (Arabic: علي أحمد حجبي, Adyghe: Алый ыкъо Ахьмэд Кушъу Шапсыгъ, romanized: Aly yqo Akhmed Kushu Shapsugh; born 2 May 2004) is a Jordanian professional footballer who plays as a defender for the Jordanian club Al-Hussein and the Jordan national team.

== Club career ==
=== Early career ===
Born in Jordan to Circassian-Jordanian parents, Hajabi began his career at Al-Ahli.

=== Al-Hussein ===
On 24 July 2024, Hajabi moved from Al-Ahli to Al-Hussein for an undisclosed fee or length.

On 16 August 2024, Hajabi was noted to have contributed to a goal for Al-Hussein in the Northern Derby against Al-Ramtha, assisting a ball to Abdullah Al-Attar in a 2–1 victory.

== International career ==
Hajabi began his international career in September 2019 as a Jordan U-16 player. On 19 January 2023, Hajabi participated with the Jordan U-20 in an international friendly against Iran.

On 26 August 2023, Hajabi got called up to the preliminary roster of the Jordan U-23 team for the 2024 AFC U-23 Asian Cup qualification process, to which on 5 September, Hajabi made the final roster.

On 23 August 2024, Hajabi was called up to the preliminary roster of the Jordan national football team. On 11 October 2024, it was announced by the Jordan Football Association that Ali Hajabi would get called up to the national team, after Husam Abu Dahab suffered from an ankle injury against South Korea.

On 21 November 2025, Hajabi was called up to the senior team for the 2025 FIFA Arab Cup, having participated in four of the five matches, including a start against Egypt.

On 23 December 2025, Hajabi was called up to the 2026 AFC U-23 Asian Cup.
