= Richard Akonnor =

Emirati footballer (born 2004)

Personal information
- Date of birth: 6 February 2004 (age 22)
- Place of birth: Accra, Ghana
- Height: 1.85 m (6 ft 1 in)
- Position: Left-back

Team information
- Current team: Göztepe
- Number: 12

Youth career
- 2014–2020: Liberty Professionals
- 2020–2022: Al Jazira

Senior career*
Years	Team	Apps	(Gls)
2022–	Al Jazira	55	(1)
2026–	→ Göztepe (loan)	7	(0)

International career^{‡}
2025–2026	United Arab Emirates U23	8	(1)
2025–	United Arab Emirates	8	(0)
- * Club domestic league appearances and goals as of 18 October 2026 ‡ National team caps and goals as of 6 October 2026

Richard Akonnor (Arabic: ريتشارد أكونور; born 6 February 2004) is a professional football player who plays as a left back for Turkish Süper Lig club Göztepe on loan from Al Jazira. Born in Ghana, he plays for the United Arab Emirates national team.

== Club career ==
Akonnor began his training with Liberty Professionals in Ghana before completing it at Al Jazira in the United Arab Emirates. There, he also signed his first professional contract, playing in the UAE Pro League. Akonnor was announced to be in a loan to Turkish Süper Lig side Göztepe after an agreement with Al Jazira.

== International career ==
In 2025, Akonnor obtained the Emirati passport and was selected to join United Arab Emirates U23. Later that same year, he was called up to the United Arab Emirates to participate in 2025 FIFA Arab Cup. In the competition's quarter-finals against Algeria, he converted the decisive spot kick in a 7–6 penalty shootout victory, sending his nation into the semi-finals.

== Personal life ==
He converted to Islam in 2022.
