= Marcus Meloni =

Emirati footballer (born 2000)

Personal information
- Full name: Marcus Vinicius Barbosa Meloni
- Date of birth: 25 June 2000 (age 26)
- Place of birth: São Paulo, Brazil
- Height: 1.73 m (5 ft 8 in)
- Positions: Midfielder; full back

Team information
- Current team: Al Jazira
- Number: 16

Youth career
- –2019: Palmeiras

Senior career*
Years	Team	Apps	(Gls)
2019–2026	Al-Sharjah	131	(6)
2026–	Al Jazira	0	(0)

International career^{‡}
2024–	United Arab Emirates	26	(2)
- * Club domestic league appearances and goals as of 25 May 2025 ‡ National team caps and goals as of 16:31, 17 November 2026 (UTC)

Marcus Vinicius Barbosa Meloni (Arabic: ماركوس فينيسيوس باربوسا ميلوني; born 25 June 2000) is a professional footballer who plays as a midfielder or full back for UAE Pro League club Al Jazira. Born in Brazil, he plays for the United Arab Emirates national team.

== Career statistics ==
=== Club ===
As of match played 23 December 2024

Appearances and goals by club, season and competition
Club	Season	League			National cup		Continental		Other		Total	
Club	Season	Division	Apps	Goals	Apps	Goals	Apps	Goals	Apps	Goals	Apps	Goals
Sharjah	2019–20	UPL	18	2	2	1	0	0	3	0	23	3
Sharjah	2020–21	UPL	21	0	2	0	0	0	2	0	31	1
Sharjah	2021–22	UPL	21	3	4	0	1	0	5	2	31	5
Sharjah	2022–23	UPL	20	0	4	0	0	0	7	0	31	0
Sharjah	2023–24	UPL	21	0	0	0	1	0	1	0	23	0
Sharjah	2024–25	UPL	9	0	0	0	6	0	3	0	18	0
Sharjah	Total		110	5	12	1	8	0	21	2	151	8
Career total			110	5	12	1	8	0	21	2	151	8

=== International ===
No.	Date	Venue	Opponent	Score	Result	Competition
1.	14 November 2024	Mohammed bin Zayed Stadium, Abu Dhabi, United Arab Emirates	Kyrgyzstan	2–0	3–0	2026 FIFA World Cup qualification
2.	11 October 2025	Jassim bin Hamad Stadium, Al Rayyan, Qatar	Oman	1–1	2–1	2026 FIFA World Cup qualification

== Honours ==
Sharjah

- UAE President's Cup: 2021–22, 2022–23
- UAE League Cup: 2022–23
- UAE Super Cup: 2019, 2022
- AFC Champions League Two: 2024–25
