= Isam Faiz =

Emirati footballer (born 2000)

Isam Faiz عِصَام فَايِز
Personal information
- Date of birth: 6 March 2000 (age 26)
- Place of birth: Khouribga, Morocco
- Height: 1.75 m (5 ft 9 in)
- Position: Midfielder

Team information
- Current team: Al-Nasr
- Number: 57

Youth career
- 2010–2018: Olympique Khouribga

Senior career*
| Years | Team | Apps | (Gls) |
| 2018–2026 | Ajman | 128 | (3) |
| 2026– | Al-Nasr | 1 | (0) |

International career^{‡}
| 2024– | United Arab Emirates | 17 | (0) |
- * Club domestic league appearances and goals ‡ National team caps and goals as of 6 October 2026

Isam Faiz (Arabic: عِصَام فَايِز; born 6 March 2000) is a footballer who plays as a midfielder for UAE Pro League club Al-Nasr. Born in Morocco, he represents the United Arab Emirates national team.

== International career ==
A Moroccan citizen by birth, Faiz was granted an Emirati passport in late 2023 following five years of residency in the United Arab Emirates, making him eligible to represent the country.

Faiz made his debut for the senior United Arab Emirates national team on 26 March 2024 in a World Cup qualifier against Yemen.

== Career statistics ==
=== Club ===
As of 1 January 2020.

| Club | Season | League | | | Cup | | Continental | | Other | | Total | |
| Club | Season | Division | Apps | Goals | Apps | Goals | Apps | Goals | Apps | Goals | Apps | Goals |
|---|---|---|---|---|---|---|---|---|---|---|---|---|
| Ajman Club | 2019–20 | UAE Pro League | 17 | 0 | 4 | 0 | 0 | 0 | 0 | 0 | 21 | 0 |
| Career total | | | 17 | 0 | 4 | 0 | 0 | 0 | 0 | 0 | 21 | 0 |
