= Lucas Pimenta =

Emirati footballer (born 2000)

Personal information
- Full name: Lucas Pimenta Peres Lopes
- Date of birth: 17 July 2000 (age 26)
- Place of birth: Niterói, Brazil
- Height: 1.87 m (6 ft 2 in)
- Position: Centre-back

Team information
- Current team: Al Wahda
- Number: 3

Youth career
- –2019: Botafogo

Senior career*
Years	Team	Apps	(Gls)
2020–	Al Wahda	127	(10)

International career^{‡}
2025–	United Arab Emirates	20	(0)
- * Club domestic league appearances and goals as of 16 March 2026 ‡ National team caps and goals as of 18 November 2026

Lucas Pimenta Peres Lopes (Arabic: لوكاس بيمنتا بيريز لوبيز, born 17 July 2000), commonly known as Lucas Pimenta or simply Pimenta, is a professional footballer who plays as a centre-back for UAE Pro League club Al Wahda. Born in Brazil, he plays for the United Arab Emirates national team.

== Career statistics ==
=== Club ===
As of 14 April 2025

Club	Season	League			Cup		Continental (Note: Includes appearances in AFC Champions League Elite and Arab Club Champions Cup)		Other (Note: Includes appearances in the UAE League Cup and Qatar-UAE Super Cup.)		Total	
Club	Season	Division	Apps	Goals	Apps	Goals	Apps	Goals	Apps	Goals	Apps	Goals
Al Wahda	2019–20	UAE Pro League	5	1	0	0	2	0	0	0	7	1
Al Wahda	2020–21	UAE Pro League	21	1	0	0	7	0	1	0	29	1
Al Wahda	2021–22	UAE Pro League	13	0	0	0	—		4	0	17	0
Al Wahda	2022–23	UAE Pro League	25	2	0	0	—		3	0	28	2
Al Wahda	2023–24	UAE Pro League	24	2	0	0	3	0	7	3	34	5
Al Wahda	2024–25	UAE Pro League	17	2	0	0	0	0	1	0	18	2
Career total			105	8	0	0	12	0	16	3	16	2

== Honours ==
Al Wahda

- UAE League Cup: 2023–24, 2025–26
- UAE–Qatar Challenge Cup: 2024–25
- UAE–Qatar Challenge Shield: 2025–26
