= 2025 FIFA Arab Cup squads =

The 2025 FIFA Arab Cup was an international football tournament held in Qatar from 1 to 18 December 2025. The 16 national teams involved in the tournament were required to register a squad of 23 players, including three goalkeepers. Only players in these squads were eligible to take part in the tournament.

The position listed for each player is per the official squad list published by FIFA on 21 November 2025. The age listed for each player is on 1 December 2025, the first day of the tournament. The numbers of caps and goals listed for each player do not include any matches played after the start of the tournament. The club listed is the club for which the player last played a competitive match prior to the tournament. (Note: This is the club a player was last able to play for during the previous season in the event a player did not play a competitive match.) The nationality for each club reflects the national association (not the league) to which the club is affiliated. A flag is included for coaches who are of a different nationality than their own national team.

== Group A ==
=== Palestine ===
Palestine's final squad was announced on 23 November 2025.

Head coach: Ihab Abu Jazar

No.	Pos.	Player	Date of birth (age)	Caps	Goals	Club
1	GK	Abed Yassin	9 May 2004 (aged 21)	0	0	(Israel Football Association) Bnei Sakhnin
2	DF	Wajdi Nabhan	27 July 2001 (aged 24)	4	0	(Jordan Football Association) Al-Wehdat
3	DF	Mohammed Saleh	18 July 1993 (aged 32)	37	0	(Qatar Football Association) Al-Rayyan
4	DF	Yaser Hamed	9 December 1997 (aged 27)	33	5	(Qatar Football Association) Al-Gharafa
5	DF	Ameed Sawafta	10 July 2000 (aged 25)	6	0	(Jordan Football Association) Al-Salt
6	MF	Oday Kharoub	5 February 1993 (aged 32)	41	1	(Libyan Football Federation) Al-Ahly Benghazi
7	DF	Musab Al-Battat (captain)	12 November 1993 (aged 32)	75	1	(Qatar Football Association) Qatar SC
8	MF	Hamed Hamdan	1 March 2000 (aged 25)	5	0	(Egyptian Football Association) Petrojet
9	FW	Tamer Seyam	25 November 1992 (aged 33)	72	15	(Qatar Football Association) Al-Shamal
10	FW	Mahmoud Abu Warda	31 May 1995 (aged 30)	44	3	(Libyan Football Federation) Al-Tahaddy
11	FW	Oday Dabbagh	3 December 1998 (aged 26)	48	16	(Egyptian Football Association) Zamalek
12	DF	Khalid Abu El Haija	13 November 2005 (aged 20)	0	0	(German Football Association) 1. FC Nürnberg
13	FW	Bader Mousa	11 April 1999 (aged 26)	3	0	(Egyptian Football Association) Petrojet
14	DF	Ahmed Taha	6 June 2001 (aged 24)	5	0	(Israel Football Association) Kafr Qasim
15	DF	Michel Termanini	8 May 1998 (aged 27)	28	2	(Qatar Football Association) Al-Shamal
16	GK	Mahdi Assi	24 December 2004 (aged 20)	0	0	(Palestinian Football Association) Shabab Al-Bireh
17	DF	Emilio Saba	26 March 2001 (aged 24)	0	0	(Peruvian Football Federation) Sport Boys
18	MF	Ahmad Al-Qaq	20 February 2002 (aged 23)	1	0	(United States Soccer Federation) North Carolina FC
19	FW	Khaled Al-Nabris	27 March 2003 (aged 22)	1	0	(Egyptian Football Association) Ismaily
20	DF	Ameed Mahajna	11 October 1996 (aged 29)	14	1	(Qatar Football Association) Al-Rayyan
21	FW	Zaid Qunbar	4 September 2002 (aged 23)	18	3	(Kuwait Football Association) Al-Arabi
22	GK	Rami Hamadeh	24 March 1994 (aged 31)	60	0	(Qatar Football Association) Al-Markhiya
23	MF	Moustafa Zeidan	7 June 1998 (aged 27)	6	0	(Norwegian Football Federation) Rosenborg

=== Qatar ===
Qatar's final squad was announced on 23 November 2025.

Head coach: (Spain) Julen Lopetegui

No.	Pos.	Player	Date of birth (age)	Caps	Goals	Club
1	GK	Shehab Ellethy	18 April 2000 (aged 25)	1	0	(Qatar Football Association) Al-Shahaniya
2	DF	Issa Laye	22 December 1997 (aged 27)	0	0	(Qatar Football Association) Al-Arabi
3	DF	Lucas Mendes	3 July 1990 (aged 35)	21	1	(Qatar Football Association) Al-Wakrah
4	MF	Mohammed Waad	18 September 1999 (aged 26)	46	0	(Qatar Football Association) Al-Sadd
5	DF	Tarek Salman	5 December 1997 (aged 27)	88	0	(Qatar Football Association) Al-Sadd
6	MF	Abdulaziz Hatem	28 October 1990 (aged 35)	115	11	(Qatar Football Association) Al-Rayyan
7	FW	Ahmed Alaaeldin	31 January 1993 (aged 32)	63	8	(Qatar Football Association) Al-Rayyan
8	MF	Jassem Gaber	20 February 2002 (aged 23)	30	1	(Qatar Football Association) Al-Rayyan
9	FW	Mohammed Muntari	20 December 1993 (aged 31)	65	16	(Qatar Football Association) Al-Gharafa
10	FW	Akram Afif (captain)	18 November 1996 (aged 29)	120	39	(Qatar Football Association) Al-Sadd
11	FW	Edmilson Junior	19 August 1994 (aged 31)	11	0	(Qatar Football Association) Al-Duhail
12	MF	Khalid Ali Sabah	5 October 2001 (aged 24)	1	0	(Qatar Football Association) Al-Sailiya
13	DF	Ayoub Al-Oui	11 March 2005 (aged 20)	2	0	(Qatar Football Association) Al-Gharafa
14	DF	Homam Ahmed	25 August 1999 (aged 26)	64	3	(Qatar Football Association) Al-Duhail
15	DF	Yousef Aymen	21 March 1999 (aged 26)	8	1	(Qatar Football Association) Al-Duhail
16	DF	Al-Hashmi Al-Hussain	15 August 2003 (aged 22)	3	0	(Qatar Football Association) Al-Arabi
17	MF	Mohamed Al-Mannai	30 October 2003 (aged 22)	5	0	(Qatar Football Association) Al-Shamal
18	DF	Sultan Al-Brake	7 April 1996 (aged 29)	13	0	(Qatar Football Association) Al-Duhail
19	FW	Mohamed Khaled Gouda	26 January 2005 (aged 20)	4	0	(Qatar Football Association) Al-Arabi
20	MF	Ahmed Fathy	25 January 1993 (aged 32)	43	0	(Qatar Football Association) Al-Arabi
21	GK	Mahmud Abunada	5 February 2000 (aged 25)	2	0	(Qatar Football Association) Al-Arabi
22	GK	Meshaal Barsham	14 February 1998 (aged 27)	50	0	(Qatar Football Association) Al-Sadd
23	MF	Assim Madibo	22 October 1996 (aged 29)	48	0	(Qatar Football Association) Al-Wakrah

=== Syria ===
Syria's final squad was announced on 20 November 2025.

Head coach: (Spain) José Lana

No.	Pos.	Player	Date of birth (age)	Caps	Goals	Club
1	GK	Elias Hadaya	21 August 1998 (aged 27)	6	0	(Norwegian Football Federation) Sandefjord
2	DF	Ahmad Faqa	10 January 2003 (aged 22)	11	2	(Football Association of Iceland) FH
3	DF	Alan Aussi	30 June 2001 (aged 24)	3	0	(Luxembourg Football Federation) F91 Dudelange
4	DF	Abdullah Al Shami	2 March 1994 (aged 31)	19	0	(Kuwait Football Association) Al-Yarmouk
5	DF	Khaled Al Hajji	22 May 2004 (aged 21)	0	0	(Syrian Football Association) Al-Karamah
6	DF	Khaled Kourdoghli	31 January 1997 (aged 28)	35	0	(Syrian Football Association) Homs Al Fidaa
7	FW	Omar Khribin (captain)	15 January 1994 (aged 31)	66	29	(United Arab Emirates Football Association) Al Wahda
8	MF	Simon Amin	13 November 1997 (aged 28)	8	0	(Swedish Football Association) Örebro
9	FW	Yassin Samia	22 February 1998 (aged 27)	9	3	(Syrian Football Association) Al-Karamah
10	FW	Mahmoud Al-Mawas	1 January 1993 (aged 32)	105	17	(Iraq Football Association) Al-Shorta
11	FW	Mohammad Al Hallaq	1 January 1999 (aged 26)	27	5	(Jordan Football Association) Al-Faisaly
12	FW	Antonio Yakoub	12 June 2002 (aged 23)	3	0	(Swedish Football Association) Örebro
13	DF	Abdulrazzak Al Mohammad	16 January 1995 (aged 30)	13	0	(Syrian Football Association) Al-Ittihad
14	MF	Anas Dahan	31 January 2006 (aged 19)	3	0	(Syrian Football Association) Al-Ittihad
15	MF	Mahmoud Nayef	3 January 2004 (aged 21)	4	0	(Syrian Football Association) Al-Karamah
16	MF	Elmar Abraham	1 March 1999 (aged 26)	16	0	(Swedish Football Association) Skövde AIK
17	MF	Mohammad Alsalkhadi	29 July 2001 (aged 24)	10	3	(Swedish Football Association) IFK Värnamo
18	MF	Mouhamad Anez	14 May 1995 (aged 30)	36	1	(Lebanese Football Association) Al Ahed
19	DF	Zakaria Hannan	21 August 1997 (aged 28)	9	0	(Syrian Football Association) Al-Ittihad
20	MF	Hasan Dahan	1 January 2003 (aged 22)	3	0	(Syrian Football Association) Al-Ittihad
21	MF	Mahmoud Al Aswad	14 September 2003 (aged 22)	15	1	(Syrian Football Association) Al-Karamah
22	GK	Shaher Al Shaker	1 April 1993 (aged 32)	5	0	(Syrian Football Association) Al-Ittihad
23	GK	Maksim Sarraf	15 March 2005 (aged 20)	0	0	(Syrian Football Association) Al-Karamah

=== Tunisia ===
Tunisia's final squad was announced on 21 November 2025. Naïm Sliti withdrew injured and was replaced by Seifeddine Jaziri on 29 November.

Head coach: Sami Trabelsi

No.	Pos.	Player	Date of birth (age)	Caps	Goals	Club
1	GK	Noureddine Farhati	14 September 2000 (aged 25)	1	0	(Tunisian Football Federation) Stade Tunisien
2	DF	Marouane Sahraoui	9 January 1996 (aged 29)	0	0	(Tunisian Football Federation) Stade Tunisien
3	DF	Mohamed Amine Ben Hamida	15 December 1995 (aged 29)	9	0	(Tunisian Football Federation) Espérance de Tunis
4	DF	Yassine Meriah	2 July 1993 (aged 32)	90	5	(Tunisian Football Federation) Espérance de Tunis
5	MF	Mohamed Ali Ben Romdhane	6 September 1999 (aged 26)	51	6	(Egyptian Football Association) Al Ahly
6	DF	Hamza Jelassi	29 September 1991 (aged 34)	5	0	(Tunisian Football Federation) Espérance de Tunis
7	FW	Nacim Dendani	30 April 2006 (aged 19)	0	0	(French Football Federation) Monaco
8	MF	Houssem Tka	16 August 2000 (aged 25)	2	0	(Tunisian Football Federation) Espérance de Tunis
9	FW	Hazem Mastouri	18 June 1997 (aged 28)	12	4	(Russian Football Union) Dynamo Makhachkala
10	MF	Chiheb Jebali	26 May 1996 (aged 29)	1	0	(Tunisian Football Federation) Espérance de Tunis
11	MF	Ismaël Gharbi	10 April 2004 (aged 21)	6	1	(German Football Association) FC Augsburg
12	DF	Ali Maâloul	1 January 1990 (aged 35)	91	3	(Tunisian Football Federation) CS Sfaxien
13	MF	Ferjani Sassi (captain)	18 March 1992 (aged 33)	94	9	(Qatar Football Association) Al-Gharafa
14	DF	Mohamed Ben Ali	16 February 1995 (aged 30)	1	0	(Tunisian Football Federation) Espérance de Tunis
15	DF	Oussama Haddadi	28 January 1992 (aged 33)	33	0	(Royal Moroccan Football Federation) RS Berkane
16	GK	Aymen Dahmen	28 January 1997 (aged 28)	29	0	(Tunisian Football Federation) CS Sfaxien
17	DF	Moutaz Neffati	4 September 2004 (aged 21)	1	0	(Swedish Football Association) IFK Norrköping
18	FW	Amor Layouni	3 October 1992 (aged 33)	13	1	(Swedish Football Association) BK Häcken
19	FW	Firas Chaouat	8 May 1996 (aged 29)	21	4	(Tunisian Football Federation) Club Africain
20	FW	Rayane Anane	15 August 2006 (aged 19)	0	0	(Tunisian Football Federation) Étoile du Sahel
21	MF	Mohamed Belhadj Mahmoud	24 April 2000 (aged 25)	2	0	(Swiss Football Association) Lugano
22	GK	Bechir Ben Saïd	29 November 1994 (aged 31)	21	0	(Tunisian Football Federation) Espérance de Tunis
23	FW	Seifeddine Jaziri	12 February 1993 (aged 32)	40	11	(Egyptian Football Association) Zamalek

== Group B ==
=== Comoros ===
Comoros's final squad was announced on 22 November 2025.

Head coach: (Madagascar) Jambay Ahamada

No.	Pos.	Player	Date of birth (age)	Caps	Goals	Club
1	GK	Adel Anzimati	5 November 2001 (aged 24)	6	0	(Football Federation of Armenia) Ararat Yerevan
2	DF	Karim Mohamed	2 April 2001 (aged 24)	1	0	(French Football Federation) Borgo
3	DF	Tamime Tarek	29 March 1998 (aged 27)	1	0	(Comoros Football Federation) Gombessa Sport
4	DF	Abdoul Anziz Omar	29 July 2002 (aged 23)	1	0	(Comoros Football Federation) Volcan
5	MF	Ismaël Mohamed	8 August 1997 (aged 28)	0	0	(Comoros Football Federation) Zilimadjou
6	MF	Zainou Dine Mohamed	16 June 2000 (aged 25)	1	0	(French Football Federation) Rousset
7	FW	Zaïd Amir	11 May 2000 (aged 25)	1	0	(French Football Federation) Istres
8	FW	Kassim Hadji	23 March 2000 (aged 25)	4	0	(Lithuanian Football Federation) Žalgiris
9	FW	Ibroihim Djoudja	6 May 1994 (aged 31)	46	11	(Botswana Football Association) Mochudi Centre Chiefs
10	FW	Affane Djambae	22 September 2000 (aged 25)	7	4	(United Arab Emirates Football Association) Masfout
11	FW	Aymeric Ahmed	8 November 2003 (aged 22)	6	0	(French Football Federation) Châteauroux
12	FW	Housseine Zakouani	8 November 2003 (aged 22)	2	0	(French Football Federation) Châteauroux
13	MF	Yassine Saindou	15 February 2001 (aged 24)	0	0	(French Football Federation) Jura Sud
14	MF	Abdelmajid Djae	3 June 2005 (aged 20)	0	0	(French Football Federation) Dijon
15	MF	Anfane Ahamada	7 May 2002 (aged 23)	3	0	(French Football Federation) Villefranche
16	GK	Ali Ahamada (captain)	19 August 1991 (aged 34)	36	0	Free agent
17	DF	Yannis Kari	2 November 2000 (aged 25)	1	0	(French Football Federation) Fréjus Saint-Raphaël
18	MF	Haslane Alfonsi Ahmed	28 December 2001 (aged 23)	6	0	(Zanzibar Football Federation) Mlandege
19	DF	Idris Mohamed	25 November 2003 (aged 22)	3	0	(French Football Federation) Le Puy
20	MF	Nassim Ahmed	9 October 2000 (aged 25)	0	0	(French Football Federation) Toulon
21	DF	Nassuir Hamidou	21 July 2000 (aged 25)	0	0	(French Football Federation) Aubagne
22	MF	Hamis M'sa	29 December 2001 (aged 23)	0	0	(Zanzibar Football Federation) Mlandege
23	GK	Ahmed Fadjidou	31 December 2000 (aged 24)	0	0	(Comoros Football Federation) Fombomi

=== Morocco ===
Morocco's final squad was announced on 24 November 2025.

Head coach: Tarik Sektioui

No.	Pos.	Player	Date of birth (age)	Caps	Goals	Club
1	GK	Salaheddine Chihab	23 February 1993 (aged 32)	0	0	(Royal Moroccan Football Federation) MAS Fès
2	DF	Mohamed Moufid	12 January 2000 (aged 25)	0	0	(Royal Moroccan Football Federation) Wydad AC
3	DF	Anas Bach	10 February 1998 (aged 27)	0	0	(Royal Moroccan Football Federation) AS FAR
4	DF	Soufiane Bouftini	3 May 1994 (aged 31)	7	2	(United Arab Emirates Football Association) Al Wasl
5	DF	Mahmoud Bentayg	30 October 1999 (aged 26)	0	0	(Egyptian Football Association) Zamalek
6	MF	Mohamed Rabie Hrimat (captain)	17 August 1994 (aged 31)	0	0	(Royal Moroccan Football Federation) AS FAR
7	DF	Mohamed Boulacsoute	23 September 1998 (aged 27)	0	0	(Royal Moroccan Football Federation) Raja CA
8	MF	Sabir Bougrine	10 July 1996 (aged 29)	6	2	(Royal Moroccan Football Federation) Raja CA
9	FW	Abderrazak Hamdallah	17 December 1990 (aged 34)	25	7	(Saudi Arabian Football Federation) Al-Shabab
10	MF	Amin Zahzouh	11 August 2000 (aged 25)	1	0	(Qatar Football Association) Al-Wakrah
11	FW	Walid Azaro	11 June 1995 (aged 30)	6	0	(United Arab Emirates Football Association) Ajman
12	GK	Mehdi Benabid	24 January 1998 (aged 27)	0	0	(Royal Moroccan Football Federation) Wydad AC
13	MF	Walid El Karti	23 July 1994 (aged 31)	21	3	(Egyptian Football Association) Pyramids
14	MF	Oussama Tannane	23 March 1994 (aged 31)	11	2	(Qatar Football Association) Umm Salal
15	DF	Marouane Louadni	21 December 1994 (aged 30)	0	0	(Royal Moroccan Football Federation) AS FAR
16	MF	Aschraf El Mahdioui	24 May 1996 (aged 29)	0	0	(Saudi Arabian Football Federation) Al-Taawoun
17	FW	Mounir Chouiar	23 January 1999 (aged 26)	0	0	(Royal Moroccan Football Federation) RS Berkane
18	DF	Marwane Saâdane	17 January 1992 (aged 33)	0	0	(Saudi Arabian Football Federation) Al-Fateh
19	DF	Hamza El Moussaoui	7 April 1993 (aged 32)	6	1	(Royal Moroccan Football Federation) RS Berkane
20	FW	Tarik Tissoudali	2 April 1993 (aged 32)	11	2	(United Arab Emirates Football Association) Khor Fakkan
21	FW	Karim El Berkaoui	29 March 1995 (aged 30)	0	0	(United Arab Emirates Football Association) Al Dhafra
22	GK	Rachid Ghanimi	25 April 2001 (aged 24)	0	0	(Royal Moroccan Football Federation) FUS Rabat
23	FW	Khalid Aït Ouarkhane	22 April 2000 (aged 25)	0	0	(Royal Moroccan Football Federation) AS FAR

=== Oman ===
Oman's final squad was announced on 23 November 2025.

Head coach: (Portugal) Carlos Queiroz

No.	Pos.	Player	Date of birth (age)	Caps	Goals	Club
1	GK	Ibrahim Al-Mukhaini	20 June 1997 (aged 28)	49	0	(Oman Football Association) Al-Nasr
2	DF	Ghanim Al-Habashi	4 August 1998 (aged 27)	7	0	(Oman Football Association) Al-Nahda
3	DF	Thani Al-Rushaidi	16 March 1995 (aged 30)	18	0	(Oman Football Association) Al-Nahda
4	DF	Khalid Al-Ghatrifi	3 December 2002 (aged 22)	0	0	(Oman Football Association) Al-Nasr
5	DF	Musab Al-Shaqsy	1 July 2000 (aged 25)	2	0	(Oman Football Association) Al-Seeb
6	DF	Ahmed Al-Khamisi	26 November 1991 (aged 34)	66	0	(Oman Football Association) Al-Seeb
7	FW	Issam Al-Sabhi	1 May 1997 (aged 28)	65	18	(Iraq Football Association) Al-Quwa Al-Jawiya
8	FW	Zahir Al-Aghbari	28 May 1999 (aged 26)	58	0	(Oman Football Association) Al-Seeb
9	FW	Mohammed Al-Ghafri	17 May 1997 (aged 28)	27	4	(Oman Football Association) Al-Nahda
10	MF	Jameel Al-Yahmadi	27 July 1996 (aged 29)	91	5	(Iraq Football Association) Al-Karma
11	FW	Nasser Al-Rawahi	26 June 2001 (aged 24)	9	1	(Oman Football Association) Al-Seeb
12	MF	Abdullah Fawaz	3 October 1996 (aged 29)	63	7	(Oman Football Association) Al-Seeb
13	MF	Musab Al-Mamari	22 January 2000 (aged 25)	15	0	(Oman Football Association) Al-Shabab
14	DF	Yousuf Al-Malki	21 August 2000 (aged 25)	2	0	(Oman Football Association) Al-Shabab
15	FW	Rabia Al-Alawi	31 March 1995 (aged 30)	42	8	(Jordan Football Association) Al-Wehdat
16	MF	Ahed Al-Mashaiki	30 May 2003 (aged 22)	7	0	(Oman Football Association) Al-Nahda
17	DF	Ali Al-Busaidi (captain)	21 March 1991 (aged 34)	106	4	(Oman Football Association) Al-Seeb
18	GK	Faiz Al-Rushaidi	19 July 1988 (aged 37)	79	0	(Oman Football Association) Dhofar
19	DF	Mahmood Al-Mushaifri	14 January 1993 (aged 32)	37	0	(Oman Football Association) Al-Shabab
20	MF	Salaah Al-Yahyaei	17 August 1998 (aged 27)	72	9	(Oman Football Association) Al-Seeb
21	DF	Arshad Al-Alawi	12 April 2000 (aged 25)	62	8	(Oman Football Association) Al-Nahda
22	GK	Ibrahim Al-Rajhi	5 October 2000 (aged 25)	1	0	(Oman Football Association) Al-Nasr
23	MF	Harib Al-Saadi	1 February 1990 (aged 35)	114	1	(Oman Football Association) Al-Nahda

=== Saudi Arabia ===
Saudi Arabia's final squad was announced on 20 November 2025.

Head coach: (France) Hervé Renard

No.	Pos.	Player	Date of birth (age)	Caps	Goals	Club
1	GK	Nawaf Al-Aqidi	10 May 2000 (aged 25)	17	0	(Saudi Arabian Football Federation) Al-Nassr
2	DF	Ali Majrashi	2 October 1999 (aged 26)	13	0	(Saudi Arabian Football Federation) Al-Ahli
3	DF	Jehad Thakri	21 July 2001 (aged 24)	5	0	(Saudi Arabian Football Federation) Al-Qadsiah
4	DF	Abdulelah Al-Amri	15 January 1997 (aged 28)	35	1	(Saudi Arabian Football Federation) Al-Nassr
5	DF	Hassan Al-Tombakti	9 February 1999 (aged 26)	46	0	(Saudi Arabian Football Federation) Al-Hilal
6	MF	Nasser Al-Dawsari	19 December 1998 (aged 26)	36	0	(Saudi Arabian Football Federation) Al-Hilal
7	MF	Musab Al-Juwayr	20 June 2003 (aged 22)	25	6	(Saudi Arabian Football Federation) Al-Qadsiah
8	MF	Ayman Yahya	14 May 2001 (aged 24)	20	0	(Saudi Arabian Football Federation) Al-Nassr
9	FW	Firas Al-Buraikan	14 May 2000 (aged 25)	61	13	(Saudi Arabian Football Federation) Al-Ahli
10	FW	Salem Al-Dawsari (captain)	19 August 1991 (aged 34)	103	25	(Saudi Arabian Football Federation) Al-Hilal
11	FW	Saleh Al-Shehri	1 November 1993 (aged 32)	49	17	(Saudi Arabian Football Federation) Al-Ittihad
12	MF	Mohammed Abu Al-Shamat	11 August 2002 (aged 23)	2	0	(Saudi Arabian Football Federation) Al-Qadsiah
13	DF	Nawaf Boushal	16 September 1999 (aged 26)	17	0	(Saudi Arabian Football Federation) Al-Nassr
14	DF	Waleed Al-Ahmed	3 May 1999 (aged 26)	4	0	(Saudi Arabian Football Federation) Al-Taawoun
15	MF	Abdullah Al-Khaibari	16 August 1996 (aged 29)	32	0	(Saudi Arabian Football Federation) Al-Nassr
16	MF	Murad Hawsawi	3 June 2001 (aged 24)	0	0	(Saudi Arabian Football Federation) Al-Khaleej
17	DF	Mohammed Sulaiman	8 April 2004 (aged 21)	4	0	(Saudi Arabian Football Federation) Al-Ahli
18	FW	Saleh Abu Al-Shamat	11 August 2002 (aged 23)	5	2	(Saudi Arabian Football Federation) Al-Ahli
19	FW	Abdullah Al-Hamdan	13 September 1999 (aged 26)	42	10	(Saudi Arabian Football Federation) Al-Hilal
20	FW	Abdulrahman Al-Aboud	1 June 1995 (aged 30)	13	2	(Saudi Arabian Football Federation) Al-Ittihad
21	GK	Abdulrahman Al-Sanbi	3 February 2001 (aged 24)	2	0	(Saudi Arabian Football Federation) Al-Ahli
22	GK	Raghed Al-Najjar	20 September 1996 (aged 29)	1	0	(Saudi Arabian Football Federation) Al-Nassr
23	MF	Mohamed Kanno	22 September 1994 (aged 31)	68	5	(Saudi Arabian Football Federation) Al-Hilal

== Group C ==
=== Egypt ===
Egypt's final squad was announced on 21 November 2025.

Head coach: Helmy Toulan

No.	Pos.	Player	Date of birth (age)	Caps	Goals	Club
1	GK	Ali Lotfi	1 October 1989 (aged 36)	1	0	(Egyptian Football Association) ZED
2	DF	Ahmed Hany	19 May 1997 (aged 28)	0	0	(Egyptian Football Association) Ceramica Cleopatra
3	DF	Yassin Marei	7 November 2001 (aged 24)	0	0	(Egyptian Football Association) Al Ahly
4	DF	Karim El Eraki	29 November 1997 (aged 28)	0	0	(Egyptian Football Association) Al Masry
5	DF	Ragab Nabil	5 January 1993 (aged 32)	0	0	(Egyptian Football Association) Ceramica Cleopatra
6	DF	Hady Reyad	10 June 1998 (aged 27)	0	0	(Egyptian Football Association) Petrojet
7	DF	Karim Fouad	1 October 1999 (aged 26)	2	0	(Egyptian Football Association) Al Ahly
8	MF	Islam Issa	1 February 1996 (aged 29)	1	0	(Egyptian Football Association) Ceramica Cleopatra
9	FW	Hossam Hassan	2 September 1993 (aged 32)	5	1	(Egyptian Football Association) Modern Sport
10	FW	Mohamed Sherif	4 February 1996 (aged 29)	21	3	(Egyptian Football Association) Al Ahly
11	MF	Mido Gaber	9 May 1995 (aged 30)	1	1	(Egyptian Football Association) Al Masry
12	MF	Akram Tawfik	8 November 1997 (aged 28)	12	1	(Qatar Football Association) Al-Shamal
13	FW	Mohamed Mosaad	14 September 2001 (aged 24)	0	0	(Egyptian Football Association) Modern Sport
14	MF	Amr El Solia	2 April 1990 (aged 35)	52	1	(Egyptian Football Association) Ceramica Cleopatra
15	DF	El-Wensh	1 June 1995 (aged 30)	26	5	(Egyptian Football Association) Zamalek
16	GK	Mohamed Awad	6 July 1992 (aged 33)	4	0	(Egyptian Football Association) Zamalek
17	MF	Mohamed Elneny (captain)	11 July 1992 (aged 33)	102	8	(United Arab Emirates Football Association) Al Jazira
18	FW	Marwan Hamdy	15 November 1996 (aged 29)	14	2	(Egyptian Football Association) Pyramids
19	MF	Ghanam Mohamed	12 March 1997 (aged 28)	1	0	(Egyptian Football Association) Modern Sport
20	MF	Mostafa Saad	22 August 2001 (aged 24)	15	1	(Egyptian Football Association) ZED
21	DF	Yehia Zakaria	20 December 2001 (aged 23)	0	0	(Egyptian Football Association) Ghazl El Mahalla
22	MF	Afsha	6 March 1996 (aged 29)	21	5	(Egyptian Football Association) Al Ahly
23	GK	Mohamed Bassam	25 December 1990 (aged 34)	0	0	(Egyptian Football Association) Ceramica Cleopatra

=== Jordan ===
Jordan's final squad was announced on 21 November 2025.

Head coach: (Morocco) Jamal Sellami

No.	Pos.	Player	Date of birth (age)	Caps	Goals	Club
1	GK	Yazeed Abulaila	8 January 1993 (aged 32)	64	0	(Jordan Football Association) Al-Hussein
2	DF	Mohammad Abu Hashish	9 May 1995 (aged 30)	50	0	(Iraq Football Association) Al-Karma
3	DF	Abdallah Nasib	25 February 1994 (aged 31)	56	3	(Iraq Football Association) Al-Zawraa
4	DF	Husam Abu Dahab	13 May 2000 (aged 25)	7	0	(Jordan Football Association) Al-Faisaly
5	DF	Hadi Al-Hourani	14 March 2000 (aged 25)	7	0	(Jordan Football Association) Al-Faisaly
6	MF	Amer Jamous	3 July 2002 (aged 23)	11	1	(Jordan Football Association) Al-Wehdat
7	FW	Mohammad Abu Zrayq	30 December 1997 (aged 27)	34	4	(Jordan Football Association) Al-Ramtha
8	FW	Odeh Al-Fakhouri	22 November 2005 (aged 20)	1	0	(Jordan Football Association) Al-Hussein
9	FW	Ali Olwan	26 March 2000 (aged 25)	58	23	(Iraq Football Association) Al-Karma
10	FW	Ahmad Ersan	28 September 1995 (aged 30)	39	4	(Jordan Football Association) Al-Faisaly
11	FW	Yazan Al-Naimat	4 June 1999 (aged 26)	67	25	(Qatar Football Association) Al-Arabi
12	GK	Malek Shalabiya	20 February 1988 (aged 37)	1	0	(Jordan Football Association) Al-Ramtha
13	FW	Mahmoud Al-Mardi (captain)	6 October 1993 (aged 32)	79	10	(United Arab Emirates Football Association) Dibba
14	MF	Rajaei Ayed	25 July 1993 (aged 32)	64	0	(Jordan Football Association) Al-Hussein
15	MF	Ibrahim Sadeh	27 April 2000 (aged 25)	51	3	(Iraq Football Association) Al-Karma
16	DF	Ali Hajabi	2 May 2004 (aged 21)	2	0	(Jordan Football Association) Al-Hussein
17	MF	Issam Smeeri	30 May 1999 (aged 26)	4	0	(Jordan Football Association) Al-Salt
18	DF	Salim Obaid	17 January 1992 (aged 33)	7	0	(Jordan Football Association) Al-Hussein
19	DF	Saed Al-Rosan	1 February 1997 (aged 28)	12	1	(Jordan Football Association) Al-Hussein
20	MF	Mohannad Abu Taha	2 February 2003 (aged 22)	19	0	(Iraq Football Association) Al-Quwa Al-Jawiya
21	MF	Nizar Al-Rashdan	23 March 1999 (aged 26)	37	3	(Iraq Football Association) Al-Zawraa
22	GK	Nour Bani Attiah	25 January 1993 (aged 32)	1	0	(Jordan Football Association) Al-Faisaly
23	MF	Adham Al-Quraishi	7 March 1995 (aged 30)	7	0	(Jordan Football Association) Al-Hussein

=== Kuwait ===
Kuwait's final squad was announced on 25 November 2025.

Head coach: (Portugal) Hélio Sousa

No.	Pos.	Player	Date of birth (age)	Caps	Goals	Club
1	GK	Khaled Al-Rashidi	20 April 1987 (aged 38)	47	0	(Kuwait Football Association) Al-Qadsia
2	DF	Hassan Al-Enezi	1 September 2000 (aged 25)	29	2	(Jordan Football Association) Al-Ahli
3	DF	Muath Al-Dhefiri	20 May 1997 (aged 28)	9	0	(Kuwait Football Association) Al-Qadsia
4	DF	Rashed Al-Dousari	18 July 2000 (aged 25)	22	0	(Kuwait Football Association) Al-Qadsia
5	DF	Fahad Al Hajeri	10 November 1991 (aged 34)	107	6	(Kuwait Football Association) Kuwait SC
6	MF	Sultan Al Enezi	29 September 1992 (aged 33)	74	0	(Kuwait Football Association) Kazma
7	FW	Mohammad Daham	17 February 2000 (aged 25)	32	11	(Kuwait Football Association) Kuwait SC
8	MF	Ahmed Al-Dhefiri	9 January 1992 (aged 33)	79	5	(Kuwait Football Association) Kuwait SC
9	MF	Nasser Faleh	12 April 1999 (aged 26)	5	0	(Kuwait Football Association) Kazma
10	MF	Fawaz Ayedh	21 February 1997 (aged 28)	35	1	(Kuwait Football Association) Al-Salmiya
11	FW	Eid Al-Rashidi	25 May 1999 (aged 26)	59	4	(Kuwait Football Association) Al-Qadsia
12	MF	Abdulwahab Al-Awadi	2 June 2002 (aged 23)	5	0	(Kuwait Football Association) Al-Arabi
13	DF	Khaled Al-Fadhli	23 February 2002 (aged 23)	4	0	(Kuwait Football Association) Al-Qadsia
14	MF	Redha Abujabrah	22 April 1996 (aged 29)	49	1	(Kuwait Football Association) Kuwait SC
15	FW	Yousef Majed	14 January 2005 (aged 20)	13	0	(Kuwait Football Association) Al-Arabi
16	DF	Mohammad Al-Sharifi	28 June 2004 (aged 21)	2	0	(Kuwait Football Association) Al-Qadsia
17	FW	Shabaib Al-Khaldi	11 August 1998 (aged 27)	40	14	(Kuwait Football Association) Kazma
18	MF	Athbi Shehab	14 October 1993 (aged 32)	19	1	(Kuwait Football Association) Al-Qadsia
19	FW	Muath Al-Enezi	16 July 2003 (aged 22)	19	1	(Kuwait Football Association) Al-Salmiya
20	FW	Yousef Nasser (captain)	9 October 1990 (aged 35)	128	59	(Kuwait Football Association) Kuwait SC
21	DF	Nasser Khader	14 October 2003 (aged 22)	2	0	(Kuwait Football Association) Al-Nasr
22	GK	Sulaiman Abdulghafour	26 February 1991 (aged 34)	59	0	(Kuwait Football Association) Al-Arabi
23	GK	Saud Al-Hoshan	18 March 2000 (aged 25)	2	0	(Kuwait Football Association) Kuwait SC

=== United Arab Emirates ===
United Arab Emirates's final squad was announced on 24 November 2025.

Head coach: (Romania) Cosmin Olăroiu

No.	Pos.	Player	Date of birth (age)	Caps	Goals	Club
1	GK	Ali Khasif	9 June 1987 (aged 38)	74	0	(United Arab Emirates Football Association) Al Jazira
2	DF	Rúben Canedo	19 October 2001 (aged 24)	6	0	(United Arab Emirates Football Association) Al Wahda
3	DF	Lucas Pimenta	17 July 2000 (aged 25)	10	0	(United Arab Emirates Football Association) Al Wahda
4	DF	Kouame Autonne	22 September 2000 (aged 25)	15	0	(United Arab Emirates Football Association) Al Ain
5	DF	Alaeddine El Zhir	7 March 2000 (aged 25)	5	0	(United Arab Emirates Football Association) Al Wahda
6	DF	Saša Ivković	13 May 1993 (aged 32)	3	1	(United Arab Emirates Football Association) Al Wahda
7	MF	Ali Saleh	22 January 2000 (aged 25)	49	6	(United Arab Emirates Football Association) Al Wasl
8	DF	Richard Akonnor	6 February 2004 (aged 21)	0	0	(United Arab Emirates Football Association) Al Jazira
9	MF	Harib Abdalla	26 November 2002 (aged 23)	43	8	(United Arab Emirates Football Association) Sharjah
10	FW	Caio Lucas	19 April 1994 (aged 31)	7	2	(United Arab Emirates Football Association) Sharjah
11	FW	Bruno	10 June 2001 (aged 24)	14	0	(United Arab Emirates Football Association) Al Jazira
12	MF	Isam Faiz	6 March 2000 (aged 25)	9	0	(United Arab Emirates Football Association) Ajman
13	FW	Mohammed Juma	30 May 2006 (aged 19)	0	0	(United Arab Emirates Football Association) Shabab Al Ahli
14	MF	Nicolás Giménez	16 January 1996 (aged 29)	6	0	(United Arab Emirates Football Association) Al Wasl
15	MF	Yahia Nader	11 September 1998 (aged 27)	25	0	(United Arab Emirates Football Association) Al Ain
16	DF	Marcus Meloni	25 June 2000 (aged 25)	16	2	(United Arab Emirates Football Association) Sharjah
17	GK	Khalid Eisa (captain)	15 September 1989 (aged 36)	94	0	(United Arab Emirates Football Association) Al Ain
18	MF	Majid Rashid	16 May 2000 (aged 25)	20	0	(United Arab Emirates Football Association) Sharjah
19	DF	Khaled Ibrahim	17 January 1997 (aged 28)	24	1	(United Arab Emirates Football Association) Sharjah
20	MF	Yahya Al-Ghassani	18 April 1998 (aged 27)	35	10	(United Arab Emirates Football Association) Shabab Al Ahli
21	MF	Luanzinho	21 April 2000 (aged 25)	7	2	(United Arab Emirates Football Association) Sharjah
22	GK	Hamad Al-Meqbaali	13 July 2003 (aged 22)	1	0	(United Arab Emirates Football Association) Shabab Al Ahli
23	FW	Sultan Adil	4 May 2004 (aged 21)	17	8	(United Arab Emirates Football Association) Shabab Al Ahli

== Group D ==
=== Algeria ===
Algeria's final squad was announced on 23 November 2025. Ayoub Ghezala was replaced by Mohamed Amine Tougai on 25 November 2025. Mohamed Azzi was replaced by Youcef Atal on 27 November 2025.

Head coach: Madjid Bougherra

No.	Pos.	Player	Date of birth (age)	Caps	Goals	Club
1	GK	Farid Chaâl	3 July 1994 (aged 31)	0	0	(Algerian Football Federation) CR Belouizdad
2	DF	Houari Baouche	24 December 1995 (aged 29)	4	0	(Algerian Football Federation) CS Constantine
3	DF	Naoufel Khacef	27 October 1997 (aged 28)	9	0	(Algerian Football Federation) CR Belouizdad
4	DF	Mohamed Amine Tougai	22 January 2000 (aged 25)	25	1	(Tunisian Football Federation) Espérance de Tunis
5	DF	Abdelkader Bedrane	2 April 1992 (aged 33)	23	0	(Saudi Arabian Football Federation) Damac
6	MF	Victor Lekhal	27 February 1994 (aged 31)	1	0	(Kuwait Football Association) Al-Qadsia
7	FW	Adil Boulbina	2 May 2003 (aged 22)	2	2	(Qatar Football Association) Al-Duhail
8	MF	Zakaria Draoui	20 February 1994 (aged 31)	18	0	(Algerian Football Federation) USM Alger
9	FW	Adam Ounas	11 November 1996 (aged 29)	27	5	(Qatar Football Association) Al-Sailiya
10	FW	Yassine Benzia	8 September 1994 (aged 31)	16	5	(Saudi Arabian Football Federation) Al-Fayha
11	FW	Yacine Brahimi (captain)	8 February 1990 (aged 35)	69	15	(Qatar Football Association) Al-Gharafa
12	DF	Réda Halaïmia	28 August 1996 (aged 29)	9	0	(Algerian Football Federation) MC Alger
13	FW	Islam Slimani	18 June 1988 (aged 37)	102	46	(Romanian Football Federation) CFR Cluj
14	MF	Sofiane Bendebka	9 August 1992 (aged 33)	18	2	(Saudi Arabian Football Federation) Al-Fateh
15	MF	Houssem Eddine Mrezigue	23 March 2000 (aged 25)	10	0	(Russian Football Union) Dynamo Makhachkala
16	GK	Rayane Yesli	12 October 1999 (aged 26)	0	0	(Canadian Soccer Association) HFX Wanderers
17	FW	Rafik Guitane	26 May 1999 (aged 26)	0	0	(Portuguese Football Federation) Estoril
18	FW	Redouane Berkane	7 July 2003 (aged 22)	2	0	(Qatar Football Association) Al-Wakrah
19	DF	Achref Abada	15 June 1999 (aged 26)	1	0	(Algerian Football Federation) ASO Chlef
20	DF	Youcef Atal	17 May 1996 (aged 29)	50	2	(Qatar Football Association) Al-Sadd
21	FW	Amir Sayoud	30 September 1990 (aged 35)	5	1	(Saudi Arabian Football Federation) Al-Hazem
22	DF	Reda Benchaa	12 March 2002 (aged 23)	0	0	(Algerian Football Federation) JS Kabylie
23	GK	Mohamed Idir Hadid	26 April 2002 (aged 23)	0	0	(Algerian Football Federation) JS Kabylie

=== Bahrain ===
Bahrain's final squad was announced on 21 November 2025.

Head coach: (Croatia) Dragan Talajić

No.	Pos.	Player	Date of birth (age)	Caps	Goals	Club
1	GK	Omar Salem Rajab	26 May 1995 (aged 30)	1	0	(Bahrain Football Association) A'Ali
2	DF	Amine Benaddi	9 May 1993 (aged 32)	37	0	(Bahrain Football Association) Al-Muharraq
3	DF	Waleed Al Hayam	4 November 1988 (aged 37)	125	0	(Bahrain Football Association) Al-Muharraq
4	MF	Sayed Dhiya Saeed (captain)	17 July 1992 (aged 33)	128	8	(Bahrain Football Association) Al-Khaldiya
5	DF	Mahmood Al-Moosawi	27 March 2004 (aged 21)	0	0	(Bahrain Football Association) Al-Riffa
6	DF	Hussain Al-Eker	30 September 2001 (aged 24)	4	0	(Bahrain Football Association) Al-Riffa
7	MF	Ali Madan	30 November 1995 (aged 30)	101	15	(Bahrain Football Association) Al-Riffa
8	MF	Mohamed Marhoon	12 February 1998 (aged 27)	78	19	(Bahrain Football Association) Al-Riffa
9	FW	Hashim Sayed Isa	3 April 1998 (aged 27)	19	6	(Bahrain Football Association) Malkiya
10	MF	Kamil Al-Aswad	8 April 1994 (aged 31)	119	13	(Bahrain Football Association) Al-Khaldiya
11	FW	Ebrahim Al-Khattal	19 September 2000 (aged 25)	28	4	(Bahrain Football Association) Al-Riffa
12	FW	Mahdi Abduljabbar	25 June 1991 (aged 34)	46	13	(Bahrain Football Association) Al-Khaldiya
13	FW	Mohamed Al-Romaihi	9 September 1990 (aged 35)	53	17	(Bahrain Football Association) Al-Khaldiya
14	DF	Vincent Emmanuel	29 April 2001 (aged 24)	10	0	(Bahrain Football Association) Sitra
15	MF	Jasim Al-Shaikh	1 February 1996 (aged 29)	67	4	(Bahrain Football Association) Al-Riffa
16	MF	Omar Saber	30 April 2001 (aged 24)	1	0	(Bahrain Football Association) Al-Muharraq
17	DF	Ahmed Bughammar	30 December 1997 (aged 27)	27	1	(Bahrain Football Association) Al-Khaldiya
18	DF	Mohamed Adel	20 September 1996 (aged 29)	22	0	(Bahrain Football Association) Al-Khaldiya
19	DF	Hazza Ali	9 June 1995 (aged 30)	14	0	(Bahrain Football Association) Al-Khaldiya
20	FW	Mahdi Al-Humaidan	19 May 1993 (aged 32)	73	7	(Iraq Football Association) Al-Zawraa
21	GK	Mohamed El-Gharably	26 October 1999 (aged 26)	0	0	(Bahrain Football Association) Al-Hidd
22	GK	Ebrahim Lutfalla	24 September 1992 (aged 33)	34	0	(Bahrain Football Association) Al-Khaldiya
23	DF	Abdulla Al-Khulasi	2 September 2003 (aged 22)	21	1	(Bahrain Football Association) Al-Muharraq

=== Iraq ===
Iraq's final squad was announced on 23 November 2025.

Head coach: (Australia) Graham Arnold

No.	Pos.	Player	Date of birth (age)	Caps	Goals	Club
1	GK	Fahad Talib	21 October 1994 (aged 31)	19	0	(Iraq Football Association) Al-Talaba
2	DF	Maitham Jabbar	10 November 2000 (aged 25)	17	0	(Iraq Football Association) Al-Zawraa
3	DF	Mustafa Saadoon	25 May 2001 (aged 24)	11	0	(Iraq Football Association) Al-Shorta
4	DF	Saad Natiq	19 March 1994 (aged 31)	39	1	(Iraq Football Association) Duhok
5	DF	Akam Hashim	16 August 1998 (aged 27)	6	1	(Iraq Football Association) Al-Zawraa
6	DF	Munaf Younis	16 November 1996 (aged 29)	28	1	(Iraq Football Association) Al-Shorta
7	MF	Hussein Ali Al-Saedi	29 November 1996 (aged 29)	50	6	(Iraq Football Association) Al-Shorta
8	MF	Amjad Attwan	12 March 1997 (aged 28)	87	4	(Iraq Football Association) Zakho
9	FW	Mohammed Jawad	19 October 1996 (aged 29)	0	0	(Iraq Football Association) Al-Quwa Al-Jawiya
10	FW	Mohanad Ali	20 June 2000 (aged 25)	64	25	(United Arab Emirates Football Association) Dibba
11	MF	Hasan Abdulkareem	1 January 1999 (aged 26)	17	1	(Iraq Football Association) Al-Zawraa
12	GK	Jalal Hassan	18 May 1991 (aged 34)	100	0	(Iraq Football Association) Al-Zawraa
13	FW	Amar Muhsin	27 December 1997 (aged 27)	5	0	(Swedish Football Association) Brage
14	MF	Sajjad Jassim	7 January 1998 (aged 27)	12	1	(Iraq Football Association) Al-Karma
15	DF	Ahmed Yahya	1 July 1995 (aged 30)	14	0	(Iraq Football Association) Al-Shorta
16	MF	Sherko Karim	25 May 1996 (aged 29)	26	1	(Iraq Football Association) Zakho
17	MF	Ali Jasim	20 January 2004 (aged 21)	30	2	(Saudi Arabian Football Federation) Al-Najma
18	FW	Aymen Hussein (captain)	22 March 1996 (aged 29)	91	32	(Iraq Football Association) Al-Karma
19	MF	Karrar Nabeel	16 January 1998 (aged 27)	4	0	(Iraq Football Association) Al-Zawraa
20	MF	Zaid Ismail	3 January 2002 (aged 23)	0	0	(Iraq Football Association) Al-Talaba
21	MF	Marko Farji	16 March 2004 (aged 21)	8	0	(Norwegian Football Federation) Strømsgodset
22	GK	Ahmed Basil	19 August 1996 (aged 29)	10	0	(Iraq Football Association) Al-Shorta
23	DF	Ahmed Maknzi	24 September 2001 (aged 24)	2	0	(Iraq Football Association) Al-Karma

=== Sudan ===
Sudan's final squad was announced on 22 November 2025.

Head coach: (Ghana) James Kwesi Appiah

No.	Pos.	Player	Date of birth (age)	Caps	Goals	Club
1	GK	Muhamed Alnour Abouja	1 January 2000 (aged 25)	8	0	(Sudan Football Association) Al-Merrikh
2	MF	Abuaagla Abdalla	11 March 1993 (aged 32)	75	3	(Libyan Football Federation) Al-Ahly Benghazi
3	DF	Mohamed Ering	20 October 1997 (aged 28)	36	0	(Sudan Football Association) Al-Hilal
4	DF	Altayeb Abdelrazeg	6 September 1991 (aged 34)	15	1	(Sudan Football Association) Al-Hilal
5	MF	Walieldin Khedr	15 September 1995 (aged 30)	58	3	(Sudan Football Association) Al-Hilal
6	DF	Mustafa Karshoum	6 December 1992 (aged 32)	36	1	(Sudan Football Association) Al-Hilal
7	DF	Yaser Awad	15 March 2006 (aged 19)	13	0	(Sudan Football Association) Al-Hilal
8	MF	Abdel Raouf	18 July 1993 (aged 32)	44	4	(Sudan Football Association) Al-Hilal
9	FW	Yaser Muzmel	1 January 1992 (aged 33)	53	7	(Sudan Football Association) Al-Hilal
10	FW	Mohamed Abdelrahman (captain)	10 July 1993 (aged 32)	58	23	(Sudan Football Association) Al-Hilal
11	FW	John Mano	12 December 2001 (aged 23)	9	0	(Libyan Football Federation) Al-Akhdar
12	DF	Bakhit Khamis	16 January 1992 (aged 33)	34	0	(Libyan Football Federation) Al-Ahli Tripoli
13	MF	Ammar Taifour	12 April 1997 (aged 28)	15	0	(Tunisian Football Federation) CS Sfaxien
14	DF	Awad Zayed	1 January 1993 (aged 32)	24	0	(Sudan Football Association) Al-Merrikh
15	MF	Salah Adel	3 April 1995 (aged 30)	40	1	(Sudan Football Association) Al-Hilal
16	GK	Alandalus Muhamed	1 January 2000 (aged 25)	0	0	(Sudan Football Association) Hay Al Wadi
17	MF	Abdelsamad Manen	4 May 2005 (aged 20)	2	0	(Sudan Football Association) Al-Zamala
18	FW	Mazen Fadl	26 July 2008 (aged 17)	13	1	(Sudan Football Association) Al-Hilal
19	DF	Ahmed Tabanja	2 September 2000 (aged 25)	22	0	(Sudan Football Association) Al-Merrikh
20	DF	Mazen Bashir	2 October 2001 (aged 24)	14	0	(Sudan Football Association) Al-Hilal
21	GK	Munjed Alnil	1 January 1996 (aged 29)	13	0	(South Sudan Football Association) Al-Merrikh Juba
22	FW	Al-Jezoli Nouh	24 October 2002 (aged 23)	36	1	(Libyan Football Federation) Al-Ahli Tripoli
23	FW	Musa Hussein	27 October 2006 (aged 19)	19	3	(Sudan Football Association) Al-Merrikh
