= 2025 FIFA Arab Cup Group A =

Association football tournament group stage

The Group A of the 2025 FIFA Arab Cup was one of the four groups of competing nations in the 2025 FIFA Arab Cup, taking place from 1 December to 7 December 2025. It consisted of hosts Qatar, Tunisia, Syria and Palestine.

The top two teams, Palestine and Syria, advanced to the quarter-finals. Despite clinching third place in the previous edition, hosts Qatar were eliminated this time.

== Teams ==
Draw position	Team	Finals appearance	Last appearance	Previous best performance	FIFA Rankings	
Draw position	Team	Finals appearance	Last appearance	Previous best performance	April 2025 (Note: The rankings of April 2025 were used for seeding for the final draw.)	November 2025
A1	Qatar	4th	2021	Runners-up (1998)	55	51
A2	Tunisia	4th	2021	Winners (1963)	49	40
A3	Syria	8th	2021	Runners-up (1963, 1966, 1988)	93	87
A4	Palestine	6th	2021	Group stage (1966, 1992, 2002, 2012, 2021)	101	96

== Standings ==
Pos	Team	Pld	W	D	L	GF	GA	GD	Pts	Qualification
1	Palestine	3	1	2	0	3	2	+1	5	Advance to knockout stage
2	Syria	3	1	2	0	2	1	+1	5	Advance to knockout stage
3	Tunisia	3	1	1	1	5	3	+2	4	
4	Qatar (H)	3	0	1	2	1	5	−4	1	

Source: FIFA
Rules for classification: Tiebreakers
(H) Hosts

In the quarter-finals:

- The winners of Group A, Palestine, advanced to play against the runners-up of Group B, Saudi Arabia.
- The runners-up of Group A, Syria, advanced to play against the winners of Group B, Morocco.

== Matches ==
=== Tunisia vs Syria ===
1 December 2025
16:00

Tunisia	0–1	Syria
	Report	Khribin 48'

Ahmad bin Ali Stadium, Al Rayyan
Attendance: 26,966
Referee: Juan Gabriel Calderón (Costa Rica)

Tunisia	Syria

GK	16	Aymen Dahmen
CB	2	Marouane Sahraoui	(yellow card) 55'	(substituted off) 62'
CB	4	Yassine Meriah
CB	15	Oussama Haddadi	(yellow card) 47'
RWB	17	Moutaz Neffati
LWB	12	Ali Maâloul
CM	18	Amor Layouni
CM	13	Ferjani Sassi (c)
CM	5	Mohamed Ali Ben Romdhane		(substituted off) 78'
CF	11	Ismaël Gharbi
CF	19	Firas Chaouat
Substitutions:
FW	23	Seifeddine Jaziri		(substituted on) 62'
MF	10	Chiheb Jebali		(substituted on) 78'
Manager:
Sami Trabelsi

GK	22	Shaher Al Shaker
RB	19	Zakaria Hannan
CB	2	Ahmad Faqa	(yellow card) 90+6'
CB	4	Abdullah Al Shami
LB	6	Khaled Kourdoghli
RM	17	Mohammad Alsalkhadi
CM	16	Elmar Abraham
CM	8	Simon Amin		(substituted off) 72'
LM	21	Mahmoud Al Aswad		(substituted off) 88'
CF	7	Omar Khribin (c)		(substituted off) 88'
CF	11	Mohammad Al Hallaq	(yellow card) 40'	(substituted off) 46'
Substitutions:
FW	9	Yassin Samia		(substituted on) 46'
MF	18	Mouhamad Anez		(substituted on) 72'
FW	10	Mahmoud Al-Mawas		(substituted on) 88'
FW	12	Antonio Yakoub		(substituted on) 88'
Manager:
(Spain) José Lana

Player of the Match:
Omar Khribin (Syria)

Assistant referees:
Juan Carlos Mora (Costa Rica)
William Arrieta (Costa Rica)
Fourth official:
Mario Escobar (Guatemala)
Reserve assistant referee:
Luis Ventura (Guatemala)
Video assistant referee:
Benjamín Pineda (Costa Rica)
Assistant video assistant referee:
Fedayi San (Switzerland)

=== Qatar vs Palestine ===
1 December 2025
18:45

Qatar	0–1	Palestine
	Report	Al-Brake 90+5' (o.g.)

Al Bayt Stadium, Al Khor
Attendance: 61,475
Referee: Glenn Nyberg (Sweden)

Qatar	Palestine

GK	21	Mahmud Abunada
RB	13	Ayoub Al-Oui
CB	16	Al-Hashmi Al-Hussain
CB	3	Lucas Mendes
LB	18	Sultan Al-Brake
CM	23	Assim Madibo (c)	(substituted off) 32'
CM	20	Ahmed Fathy	(substituted off) 79'
RW	19	Mohamed Khaled Gouda	(substituted off) 62'
AM	17	Mohamed Al-Mannai	(substituted off) 46'
LW	10	Akram Afif
CF	7	Ahmed Alaaeldin	(substituted off) 62'
Substitutions:
DF	2	Issa Laye	(substituted on) 32'
FW	11	Edmilson Junior	(substituted on) 46'
FW	9	Mohammed Muntari	(substituted on) 62'
MF	12	Khalid Ali Sabah	(substituted on) 62'
MF	4	Mohammed Waad	(substituted on) 79'
Manager:
(Spain) Julen Lopetegui

GK	22	Rami Hamadeh
CB	3	Mohammed Saleh
CB	15	Michel Termanini
CB	7	Musab Al-Battat (c)
RWB	17	Emilio Saba		(substituted off) 60'
LWB	2	Wajdi Nabhan
CM	20	Ameed Mahajna		(substituted off) 74'
CM	8	Hamed Hamdan	(yellow card) 44'	(substituted off) 89'
RF	23	Moustafa Zeidan		(substituted off) 60'
CF	21	Zaid Qunbar
LF	9	Tamer Seyam		(substituted off) 74'
Substitutions:
FW	11	Oday Dabbagh		(substituted on) 60'
DF	5	Ameed Sawafta		(substituted on) 60'
FW	18	Ahmad Al-Qaq		(substituted on) 74'
FW	19	Khaled Al-Nabris		(substituted on) 74'
MF	6	Oday Kharoub		(substituted on) 89'
Manager:
Ihab Abu Jazar

Player of the Match:
Mohammed Saleh (Palestine)

Assistant referees:
Mahbod Beigi (Sweden)
Andreas Söderkvist (Sweden)
Fourth official:
Campbell-Kirk Kawana-Waugh (New Zealand)
Reserve assistant referee:
Isaac Trevis (New Zealand)
Video assistant referee:
Jarred Gillett (Australia)
Assistant video assistant referee:
Lahlou Benbraham (Algeria)

=== Palestine vs Tunisia ===
4 December 2025
17:30

Palestine	2–2	Tunisia
Hamdan 61'; Qunbar 85'	Report	Layouni 16'; Chaouat 51'

Lusail Stadium, Lusail
Attendance: 44,548
Referee: Ismail Elfath (United States)

Palestine	Tunisia

GK	22	Rami Hamadeh
RB	7	Musab Al-Battat (c)
CB	15	Michel Termanini
CB	3	Mohammed Saleh	(yellow card) 47'
LB	2	Wajdi Nabhan		(substituted off) 67'
CM	20	Ameed Mahajna		(substituted off) 73'
CM	5	Ameed Sawafta	(yellow card) 22'	(substituted off) 46'
RW	17	Emilio Saba		(substituted off) 46'
AM	8	Hamed Hamdan		(substituted off) 84'
LW	19	Khaled Al-Nabris
CF	21	Zaid Qunbar
Substitutions:
FW	18	Ahmad Al-Qaq		(substituted on) 46'
FW	11	Oday Dabbagh		(substituted on) 46'
DF	14	Ahmed Taha		(substituted on) 67'
MF	6	Oday Kharoub		(substituted on) 73'
MF	23	Moustafa Zeidan		(substituted on) 84'
Manager:
Ihab Abu Jazar

GK	16	Aymen Dahmen
RB	14	Mohamed Ben Ali		(substituted off) 46'
CB	6	Hamza Jelassi
CB	4	Yassine Meriah
LB	12	Ali Maâloul		(substituted off) 90+1'
CM	8	Houssem Tka		(substituted off) 74'
CM	13	Ferjani Sassi (c)	(yellow card) 35'
RW	18	Amor Layouni		(substituted off) 46'
AM	11	Ismaël Gharbi
LW	5	Mohamed Ali Ben Romdhane
CF	19	Firas Chaouat		(substituted off) 82'
Substitutions:
FW	20	Rayane Anane		(substituted on) 46'
DF	17	Moutaz Neffati		(substituted on) 46'
DF	15	Oussama Haddadi		(substituted on) 74'
FW	23	Seifeddine Jaziri		(substituted on) 82'
MF	10	Chiheb Jebali		(substituted on) 90+1'
Manager:
Sami Trabelsi

Player of the Match:
Zaid Qunbar (Palestine)

Assistant referees:
Corey Parker (United States)
Kyle Atkins (United States)
Fourth official:
Ma Ning (China)
Reserve assistant referee:
Zhou Fei (China)
Video assistant referee:
Allen Chapman (United States)
Assistant video assistant referee:
Abdullah Al-Shehri (Saudi Arabia)

=== Syria vs Qatar ===
4 December 2025
20:00

Syria	1–1	Qatar
Khribin 90'	Report	Alaaeldin 77'

Khalifa International Stadium, Al Rayyan
Attendance: 42,467
Referee: Mario Escobar (Guatemala)

Syria	Qatar

GK	1	Elias Hadaya
RB	19	Zakaria Hannan
CB	2	Ahmad Faqa
CB	4	Abdullah Al Shami	(substituted off) 46'
LB	13	Abdulrazzak Al Mohammad
CM	18	Mouhamad Anez	(substituted off) 71'
CM	16	Elmar Abraham	(substituted off) 82'
RW	12	Antonio Yakoub	(substituted off) 63'
AM	10	Mahmoud Al-Mawas	(substituted off) 63'
LW	11	Mohammad Al Hallaq
CF	7	Omar Khribin (c)
Substitutions:
DF	6	Khaled Kourdoghli	(substituted on) 46'
MF	17	Mohammad Alsalkhadi	(substituted on) 63'
MF	21	Mahmoud Al Aswad	(substituted on) 63'
MF	8	Simon Amin	(substituted on) 71'
FW	9	Yassin Samia	(substituted on) 82'
Manager:
(Spain) José Lana

GK	22	Meshaal Barsham
RB	5	Tarek Salman
CB	16	Al-Hashmi Al-Hussain
CB	2	Issa Laye
LB	4	Mohammed Waad
DM	8	Jassem Gaber		(substituted off) 69'
RM	11	Edmilson Junior		(substituted off) 78'
CM	6	Abdulaziz Hatem (c)		(substituted off) 69'
CM	17	Mohamed Al-Mannai
LM	14	Homam Ahmed		(substituted off) 69'
CF	10	Akram Afif	(yellow card) 84'	(substituted off) 88'
Substitutions:
MF	20	Ahmed Fathy	(yellow card) 81'	(substituted on) 69'
FW	7	Ahmed Alaaeldin		(substituted on) 69'
DF	18	Sultan Al-Brake		(substituted on) 69'
FW	19	Mohamed Khaled Gouda		(substituted on) 78'
DF	3	Lucas Mendes		(substituted on) 88'
Manager:
(Spain) Julen Lopetegui

Player of the Match:
Omar Khribin (Syria)

Assistant referees:
Luis Ventura (Guatemala)
Humberto Panjoj (Guatemala)
Fourth official:
Cristián Garay (Chile)
Reserve assistant referee:
José Retamal (Chile)
Video assistant referee:
Antonio García Noni (Uruguay)
Assistant video assistant referee:
Dennis Higler (Netherlands)

=== Qatar vs Tunisia ===
7 December 2025
20:00

Qatar	0–3	Tunisia
	Report	Ben Romdhane 16'; Meriah 62'; Ben Ali 90+4'

Al Bayt Stadium, Al Khor
Attendance: 48,151
Referee: Espen Eskås (Norway)

Qatar	Tunisia

GK	22	Meshaal Barsham
RB	13	Ayoub Al-Oui	(substituted off) 66'
CB	16	Al-Hashmi Al-Hussain	(substituted off) 66'
CB	3	Lucas Mendes
LB	18	Sultan Al-Brake	(substituted off) 46'
CM	20	Ahmed Fathy
CM	4	Mohammed Waad	(substituted off) 78'
RW	10	Akram Afif (c)
AM	17	Mohamed Al-Mannai
LW	14	Homam Ahmed
CF	7	Ahmed Alaaeldin	(substituted off) 46'
Substitutions:
DF	5	Tarek Salman	(substituted on) 46'
FW	11	Edmilson Junior	(substituted on) 46'
DF	15	Yousef Aymen	(substituted on) 66'
FW	19	Mohamed Khaled Gouda	(substituted on) 66'
FW	9	Mohammed Muntari	(substituted on) 78'
Manager:
(Spain) Julen Lopetegui

GK	16	Aymen Dahmen
CB	6	Hamza Jelassi
CB	4	Yassine Meriah		(substituted off) 90'
CB	15	Oussama Haddadi
RWB	14	Mohamed Ben Ali
LWB	12	Ali Maâloul
CM	8	Houssem Tka
CM	13	Ferjani Sassi (c)
CM	5	Mohamed Ali Ben Romdhane
CF	23	Seifeddine Jaziri	(yellow card) 40' (yellow-red card) 65'
CF	19	Firas Chaouat		(substituted off) 86'
Substitutions:
FW	18	Amor Layouni		(substituted on) 86'
DF	3	Mohamed Amine Ben Hamida		(substituted on) 90'
Manager:
Sami Trabelsi

Player of the Match:
Mohamed Ali Ben Romdhane (Tunisia)

Assistant referees:
Jan Erik Engan (Norway)
Isaak Bashevkin (Norway)
Fourth official:
Juan Gabriel Calderón (Costa Rica)
Reserve assistant referee:
Juan Carlos Mora (Costa Rica)
Video assistant referee:
Dennis Higler (Netherlands)
Assistant video assistant referee:
Rodolpho Toski (Brazil)

=== Syria vs Palestine ===
7 December 2025
20:00

Syria	0–0	Palestine
	Report

Education City Stadium, Al Rayyan
Attendance: 39,571
Referee: Ahmed Al-Kaf (Oman)

Syria	Palestine

GK	1	Elias Hadaya
RB	19	Zakaria Hannan
CB	2	Ahmad Faqa
CB	13	Abdulrazzak Al Mohammad
LB	6	Khaled Kourdoghli
CM	16	Elmar Abraham	(substituted off) 90+1'
CM	8	Simon Amin	(substituted off) 73'
RW	17	Mohammad Alsalkhadi	(substituted off) 85'
AM	10	Mahmoud Al-Mawas	(substituted off) 73'
LW	21	Mahmoud Al Aswad	(substituted off) 85'
CF	7	Omar Khribin (c)
Substitutions:
MF	20	Hasan Dahan	(substituted on) 73'
MF	18	Mouhamad Anez	(substituted on) 73'
FW	12	Antonio Yakoub	(substituted on) 85'
MF	14	Anas Dahan	(substituted on) 85'
MF	15	Mahmoud Nayef	(substituted on) 90+1'
Manager:
(Spain) José Lana

GK	22	Rami Hamadeh
RB	7	Musab Al-Battat (c)
CB	15	Michel Termanini	(yellow card) 42'
CB	3	Mohammed Saleh
LB	2	Wajdi Nabhan
CM	20	Ameed Mahajna
CM	8	Hamed Hamdan		(substituted off) 88'
RW	9	Tamer Seyam		(substituted off) 88'
AM	19	Khaled Al-Nabris		(substituted off) 72'
LW	21	Zaid Qunbar
CF	11	Oday Dabbagh		(substituted off) 90+3'
Substitutions:
DF	5	Ameed Sawafta		(substituted on) 72'
FW	18	Ahmad Al-Qaq		(substituted on) 88'
MF	6	Oday Kharoub		(substituted on) 88'
DF	12	Khalid Abu El Haija		(substituted on) 90+3'
Manager:
Ihab Abu Jazar

Player of the Match:
Mohammad Alsalkhadi (Syria)

Assistant referees:
Abu Bakr Al-Amri (Oman)
Rashid Al-Ghaiti (Oman)
Fourth official:
Amin Omar (Egypt)
Reserve assistant referee:
Ahmed Ali (Egypt)
Video assistant referee:
Abdullah Al-Shehri (Saudi Arabia)
Assistant video assistant referee:
Sivakorn Pu-udom (Thailand)
