= 2025 FIFA Arab Cup qualification =

Football tournament qualification

Tournament details
- Host country: Qatar
- Dates: 25–26 November
- Teams: 14 (from 2 confederations)
- Venues: 4 (in 2 host cities)

Tournament statistics
- Matches played: 7
- Goals scored: 16 (2.29 per match)
- Attendance: 44,625 (6,375 per match)
- Top scorer(s): (Comoros) Zaïd Amir (Kuwait) Mohammad Daham (Yemen) Abdulwasea Al-Matari (2 goals each)

The 2025 FIFA Arab Cup qualification were played from 25 to 26 November 2025. A total of 14 teams competed in the qualifying play-offs to qualify for the group stage of the 2025 FIFA Arab Cup.

== Format ==
The 14 lowest-ranked teams in the April 2025 FIFA World Ranking met on 25 and 26 November in a single knockout match. The best-ranked AFC team met the lowest-ranked CAF team, the second-best AFC team played the second-lowest CAF team, and so on. In the qualifying play-offs, each tie was played as a single match. A penalty shoot-out was used to decide the winner if necessary.

== Draw ==
The group stage draw took place on 25 May 2025 at 20:00 AST (UTC+3) in at the Raffles Hotel in Doha, Qatar.

These 14 teams were divided into 7 pairings, with each pair playing single knockout match across 25 to 26 November 2025. The numbers in parentheses indicate the FIFA Men's World Ranking of April 2025.

Note: Bolded teams qualified for the group stage.

Pot 1 (AFC)	Pot 2 (CAF)
**Oman** (77); **Bahrain** (84); **Syria** (93); **Palestine** (101); **Kuwait** (134); Yemen (158); Lebanon (112)	**Sudan** (114); Libya (117); **Comoros** (105); Mauritania (110); South Sudan (170); Djibouti (192); Somalia (201)

== Summary ==
The seven winners advanced to the group stage.

Team 1	Score	Team 2
Mauritania	0–2	**Kuwait**
**Syria**	2–0	South Sudan
**Palestine**	0–0 (4–3 p)	Libya
**Oman**	0–0 (4–1 p)	Somalia
**Bahrain**	1–0	Djibouti
**Sudan**	2–1	Lebanon
**Comoros**	4–4 (4–2 p)	Yemen

== Matches ==
All times are local, AST (UTC+3).

25 November 2025
16:00
Qualifying 6

Mauritania	0–2	Kuwait
	Report	Daham 8', 24'

Jassim bin Hamad Stadium, Al Rayyan
Attendance: 4,268
Referee: Ma Ning (China)

Kuwait advanced to Group C.

25 November 2025
19:00
Qualifying 3

Syria	2–0	South Sudan
Al Hallaq 52'; Al-Mawas 59'	Report

Grand Hamad Stadium, Doha
Attendance: 7,294
Referee: Amin Omar (Egypt)

Syria advanced to Group A.

25 November 2025
19:00
Qualifying 4

Palestine	0–0	Libya
	Report
Penalties
Dabagh (penalty scored); Hamdan (penalty scored); Saleh (penalty scored); Termanini (penalty missed); Mahajna (penalty scored)	4–3	(penalty missed) Yusuf; (penalty scored) Ali; (penalty scored) Taqtaq; (penalty scored) Tajouri; (penalty missed) Al Hbeishi

Al Gharafa Stadium, Al Rayyan
Attendance: 5,348
Referee: Mario Escobar (Guatemala)

Palestine advanced to Group A.

26 November 2025
16:00
Qualifying 1

Oman	0–0	Somalia
	Report
Penalties
Al-Busaidi (penalty scored); Al-Rawahi (penalty scored); Al-Yahyaei (penalty scored); Al-Ghafri (penalty scored)	4–1	(penalty missed) S. Hassan; (penalty scored) M. Omar; (penalty missed) Musse

Abdullah bin Khalifa Stadium, Doha
Attendance: 3,957
Referee: Juan Calderón (Costa Rica)

Oman advanced to Group D.

26 November 2025
16:00
Qualifying 2

Bahrain	1–0	Djibouti
Al-Romaihi 36'	Report

Jassim bin Hamad Stadium, Al Rayyan
Attendance: 1,600
Referee: Juan Gabriel Benítez (Paraguay)

Bahrain advanced to Group D.

26 November 2025
19:00
Qualifying 5

Sudan	2–1	Lebanon
Haidar 43' (o.g.); Awad 74'	Report	Khamis 30'

Al Gharafa Stadium, Al Rayyan
Attendance: 20,816
Referee: Abdulrahman Al-Jassim (Qatar)

Sudan advanced to Group D.

26 November 2025
19:00
Qualifying 7

Comoros	4–4	Yemen
Zakouani 30' (pen.); Anbar 61' (o.g.); Amir 90+1' (pen.), 90+3'	Report	Al-Zubaidi 14'; Al-Gahwashi 40'; Al-Matari 45+2', 65'
Penalties
Kari (penalty scored); Zakouani (penalty scored); Djae (penalty scored); Amir (penalty scored)	4–2	(penalty scored) Al-Zubaidi; (penalty scored) Al-Golan; (penalty missed) Al-Wasmani; (penalty missed) Al-Gahwashi

Grand Hamad Stadium, Doha
Attendance: 1,342
Referee: Cristián Garay (Chile)

Comoros advanced to Group B.

== Goalscorers ==
There were 16 goals scored in 7 matches, for an average of 2.29 goals per match.

2 goals

- (Comoros) Zaïd Amir
- (Kuwait) Mohammad Daham
- (Yemen) Abdulwasea Al-Matari

1 goal

- (Comoros) Housseine Zakouani
- (Bahrain) Mohamed Al-Romaihi
- (Lebanon) Khalil Khamis
- (Sudan) Yaser Awad
- (Syria) Mohammad Al Hallaq
- (Syria) Mahmoud Al-Mawas
- (Yemen) Harwan Al-Zubaidi
- (Yemen) Nasser Al-Gahwashi

1 own goal

- (Lebanon) Mohamad Haidar (against Sudan)
- (Yemen) Osama Anbar (against Comoros)

Source: FIFA
