= IFK Skövde (disambiguation) =

IFK Skövde is a Swedish sports club located in Skövde, with the following sections:

- IFK Skövde HK – handball section.
- IFK Skövde FK - football section.
