= Adham Al-Quraishi =

Jordanian footballer

Personal information
- Full name: Adham Mohammad Salem Al-Quraishi
- Date of birth: 7 March 1995 (age 31)
- Place of birth: Zarqa, Jordan
- Height: 1.69 m (5 ft 7 in)
- Position: Right back

Team information
- Current team: Al-Hussein
- Number: 17

Youth career
- –2016: Al-Wehdat

Senior career*
Years	Team	Apps	(Gls)
2016–2019	Al-Wehdat		
2019–2022	Al-Salt		
2022–	Al-Hussein		

International career^{‡}
2018	Jordan U23	4	(0)
2025–	Jordan	10	(0)
Medal record
Representing Jordan
Men's football
FIFA Arab Cup
Runner-up	2025 Qatar	Team
- * Club domestic league appearances and goals ‡ National team caps and goals as of 12 December 2025

Adham Mohammad Salem Al-Quraishi (Arabic: أدهم القريشي; born 7 March 1995) is a Jordanian professional footballer who plays as a Right back for Al-Hussein and the Jordan national team.

== Club career ==
=== Al-Wehdat ===
Born in Zarqa, Al-Quraishi began his career at Al-Wehdat.

=== Al-Salt ===
On 5 November 2019, Al-Quraishi moved from Al-Wehdat to Al-Salt. He was among the main contributors to Al-Salt's AFC Cup campaign, as well as finishing third in the 2021 Jordanian Pro League season.

=== Al-Hussein ===
On 6 January 2022, Al-Quraishi moved from Al-Salt to Al-Hussein.

He became among the main contributors to Al-Hussein's first ever Jordanian Pro League trophy in the 2023–24 season, as well as participate in the AFC Champions League Two the following season.

On 24 July, Al-Quraishi renewed his contract with Al-Hussein on a two-year contract.

On 2 February 2025, Al-Quraishi scored a goal during the first leg of the 2024 Jordan Super Cup, against his former club Al-Wehdat. He would later go on to win the competition.

== International career ==
On 8 March 2025, Al-Quraishi received a call up to the Jordan national football team for the 2026 FIFA World Cup qualification matches against Palestine and South Korea.
