= Elmar Abraham =

Footballer (born 1999)

Personal information
- Date of birth: 1 March 1999 (age 27)
- Place of birth: Skövde, Sweden
- Height: 1.75 m (5 ft 9 in)
- Position: Midfielder

Team information
- Current team: IFK Skövde

Youth career
- IFK Skövde

Senior career*
Years	Team	Apps	(Gls)
2015–2017	IFK Skövde	58	(1)
2018–2026	Skövde AIK	214	(12)
2026–	IFK Skövde		

International career^{‡}
2023–	Syria	24	(0)
- * Club domestic league appearances and goals as of 24 November 2025 ‡ National team caps and goals as of 17 November 2026

Elmar Abraham (Arabic: إلمار أبراهام; born 1 March 1999) is a professional footballer who plays as a midfielder for IFK Skövde. Born in Sweden, he plays for the Syria national team.

== Club career ==
Born in Skövde, Sweden, Abraham is a youth product of his local team IFK Skövde. In March 2018, he joined their rival Skövde AIK. In 2021, he appeared in 25 games the season, playing an important role the team's promotion the 2022 Superettan after defeating Akropolis IF in the promotion play-offs.

== International career ==
Born in Sweden to Syrian Assyrian parents, Abraham is eligible to represent Sweden or Syria. He made his international debut for Syria in October 2023 in a friendly game against Kuwait. In January 2024, Abraham was named in Syria national team's 26-men squad for the 2023 AFC Asian Cup.

== Personal life ==
Elmar Abraham is the younger brother of Sargon Abraham, who is also a footballer.
