= Ahmed Alaaeldin =

Qatari footballer (born 1993)

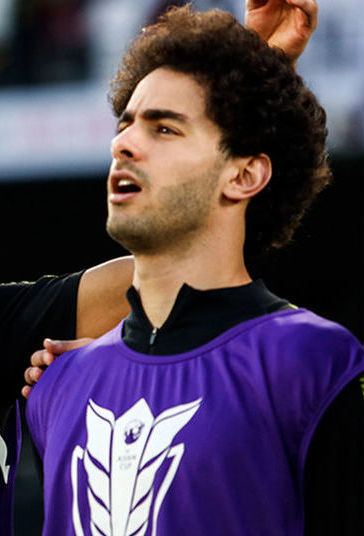
- Alaaeldin in 2019

Personal information
- Full name: Ahmed Alaaeldin Abdelmotaal
- Date of birth: 31 January 1993 (age 33)
- Place of birth: Ismailia, Egypt
- Height: 1.76 m (5 ft 9 in)
- Position: Forward

Team information
- Current team: Al-Rayyan
- Number: 30

Senior career*
Years	Team	Apps	(Gls)
2010–2017	Al-Rayyan	56	(5)
2017–2025	Al-Gharafa	122	(35)
2024–2025	→ Al-Arabi (loan)	17	(6)
2025–	Al-Rayyan	0	(0)

International career^{‡}
2013–	Qatar	60	(7)
Medal record
Representing Qatar
Men's Football
AFC Asian Cup
Winner	2019 UAE	Team
Winner	2023 Qatar	Team
FIFA Arab Cup
Third place	2021 Qatar	Team
- * Club domestic league appearances and goals as of 4 April 2024 ‡ National team caps and goals as of 25 December 2023

Ahmed Alaaeldin Abdelmotaal (Arabic: أحمد علاء الدين عبد المتعال; born 31 January 1993), simply known as Ahmed Alaaeldin or Alaa, is a professional footballer who plays for Al-Rayyan. Born in Egypt, he plays for the Qatar national team.

== Early life ==
Alaaeldin arrived in Qatar when he was 10 years old. His father, an Egyptian civil engineer, brought his family to Qatar in 2003.

== Club career ==
Alaaeldin began his professional career with Al-Rayyan SC in 2010. He scored in the 2011 AFC Champions League game against Emirates Club.

In July 2017, he joined Al-Gharafa SC.

== International career ==
Alaaeldin has played for the Qatar Olympic football team in the GGC U23 tournament in August 2011. He was also at the 2016 AFC U-23 Championship and was the top goal scorer with 6 goals during the competition.

== Career statistics ==
=== International ===
As of match played 25 March 2025

Appearances and goals by national team and year
National team	Year	Apps	Goals
Qatar	2013	1	0
Qatar	2016	2	0
Qatar	2017	6	0
Qatar	2018	10	1
Qatar	2019	10	0
Qatar	2020	4	0
Qatar	2021	13	0
Qatar	2022	7	0
Qatar	2023	10	4
Qatar	2024	3	0
Qatar	2025	2	1
Total		68	6

Scores and results list United Arab Emirates' goal tally first, score column indicates score after each Alaaeldin goal.

List of international goals scored by Ahmed Alaaeldin
No.	Date	Venue	Opponent	Score	Result	Competition	Ref.
1	23 December 2018	Khalifa International Stadium, Al Rayyan, Qatar	Jordan	2–0	2–0	Friendly	
2	7 January 2023	Al-Minaa Olympic Stadium, Basra, Iraq	Kuwait	2–0	2–0	25th Arabian Gulf Cup	
3	10 January 2023	Al-Minaa Olympic Stadium, Basra, Iraq	Bahrain	1–0	1–2	25th Arabian Gulf Cup	
4	12 September 2023	Al Janoub Stadium, Al Wakrah, Qatar	Russia	1–0	1–1	Friendly	
5	16 November 2023	Khalifa International Stadium, Al Rayyan, Qatar	Afghanistan	7–1	8–1	2026 FIFA World Cup qualification	
6	20 March 2025	Jassim bin Hamad Stadium, Doha, Qatar	North Korea	5–0	5–1	2026 FIFA World Cup qualification	
7	4 December 2025	Khalifa International Stadium, Al Rayyan, Qatar	Syria	1–0	1–1	2025 FIFA Arab Cup	

== Honours ==
Al-Rayyan

- Qatari Stars League: 2015–16
- Qatar Cup: 2012
- Emir of Qatar Cup: 2011
- Qatari Sheikh Jassim Cup: 2013

Al-Gharafa

- Qatari Stars Cup: 2017–18, 2018–19

Qatar

- AFC Asian Cup: 2019, 2023

Individual

- AFC U-23 Championship top goalscorer: 2016
