= Firas Chaouat =

Tunisian footballer (born 1996)

Personal information
- Date of birth: 8 May 1996 (age 30)
- Place of birth: Sfax, Tunisia
- Height: 1.85 m (6 ft 1 in)
- Position: Striker

Team information
- Current team: Al Ahly SC
- Number: 9

Senior career*
Years	Team	Apps	(Gls)
2015–2020	CS Sfaxien	57	(19)
2019–2020	→ Abha (loan)	13	(1)
2020–2022	CS Sfaxien	39	(9)
2022–2023	Ismaily	21	(7)
2023–2024	Al Muharraq		(6)
2024–2025	Étoile Sportive du Sahel	27	(16)
2025–2026	Club Africain	25	(14)
2026-	Al Ahly SC	2	(1)

International career^{‡}
2018–	Tunisia	33	(6)
- * Club domestic league appearances and goals as of 19:20, 21 November 2026 (UTC) ‡ National team caps and goals as of 21:45, 26 June 2026 (UTC)

Firas Chaouat (Arabic: فراس شواط, born 8 May 1996) is a Tunisian professional footballer who plays as a forward for the Tunisia national team.

== Career ==
In September 2022, Chaouat joined Egyptian Premier League club Ismaily SC.

In July 2024, he joined Tunisian side Etoile Sportive du Sahel.

In July 2025, Chaouat joined Club Africain.

== Career statistics ==
=== International ===
As of matches played on 25 June 2026

Tunisia
Year	Apps	Goals
2018	3	2
2019	7	0
2021	2	0
2025	13	3
2026	8	1
Total	33	6

List of international goals scored by Firas Chaouat
No.	Date	Venue	Opponent	Score	Result	Competition
1	16 October 2018	Stade Général Seyni Kountché, Niamey, Niger	Niger	1–0	2–1	2019 Africa Cup of Nations
2	16 October 2018	Stade Général Seyni Kountché, Niamey, Niger	Niger	2–0	2–1	2019 Africa Cup of Nations
3	10 October 2025	Hammadi Agrebi Stadium, Tunis, Tunisia	São Tomé and Príncipe	1–0	6–0	2026 FIFA World Cup qualification
4	12 November 2025	Hammadi Agrebi Stadium, Tunis, Tunisia	Mauritania	1–0	1–1	Friendly
5	4 December 2025	Lusail Stadium, Lusail, Qatar	Palestine	2–0	2–2	2025 FIFA Arab Cup
6	3 January 2026	Stade Mohammed V, Casablanca, Morocco	Mali	1–0	1–1 (a.e.t.) (2–3 p)	2025 Africa Cup of Nations
