= Wajdi Nabhan =

Palestinian footballer

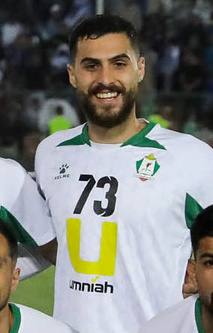
- Nabhan with Al-Wehdat in 2025

Personal information
- Date of birth: 27 July 2001 (age 25)
- Place of birth: Al-Bireh, Palestine
- Height: 1.86 m (6 ft 1 in)
- Position: Left back

Team information
- Current team: ZED FC
- Number: 73

Senior career*
| Years | Team | Apps | (Gls) |
| –2024 | Shabab Al-Bireh Institute | | |
| 2024–2025 | Al-Jazeera | 19 | (3) |
| 2025–2026 | Al-Wehdat | 12 | (0) |
| 2026– | ZED FC | 3 | (1) |

International career^{‡}
| | Palestine U18 | 2 | |
| | Palestine U19 | 4 | |
| 2021–2023 | Palestine U23 | 16 | (3) |
| 2023 | Palestine Olympic | 3 | (0) |
| 2024– | Palestine | 7 | (0) |
- * Club domestic league appearances and goals as of 29 January 2026 ‡ National team caps and goals as of 11 December 2025

Wajdi Nabhan (Arabic: وجدي نبهان; born 27 July 2001) is a Palestinian professional footballer who plays as a left back for ZED FC and the Palestine national team. He can also be deployed as a left winger.

== Career ==
On 27 July 2024, he signed a contract with Al-Jazeera Club based in Amman.

Nabhan earned his first international cap in a 0–1 defeat against Oman during the 2026 FIFA World Cup qualifiers. On 18 June 2025, Al-Wehdat announced the signing of Nabhan on a one-year contract.
