= Elias Hadaya =

Syrian footballer (born 1998)

Personal information
- Date of birth: 31 August 1998 (age 28)
- Place of birth: Eskilstuna, Sweden
- Height: 1.96 m (6 ft 5 in)
- Position: Goalkeeper

Team information
- Current team: Sandefjord
- Number: 30

Youth career
- –2016: AFC Eskilstuna

Senior career*
Years	Team	Apps	(Gls)
2013	Valsta Syrianska IK	0	(0)
2017–2018	Assyriska FF	13	(0)
2019–2020	Levanger FK	36	(0)
2021–2022	Kristiansund BK	1	(0)
2022	→ Bryne FK (loan)	15	(0)
2023–2024	Utsiktens BK	60	(0)
2025–	Sandefjord Fotball	37	(0)

International career^{‡}
2024–	Syria	13	(0)
- * Club domestic league appearances and goals as of 16 August 2026 ‡ National team caps and goals as of 17 November 2026

Elias Hadaya (Arabic: الياس هدايا; born 31 August 1998) is a professional footballer who plays as a goalkeeper for Eliteserien club Sandefjord Fotball. Born in Sweden, he plays for the Syria national team.

== Club career ==
Hadaya started his career with Swedish side Valsta Syrianska IK in 2013. In 2017, he signed for Assyriska FF, where he made thirteen league appearances and scored zero goals and suffered relegation from the third tier to the fourth tier while playing for the club. Two years later, he signed for Norwegian side Levanger FK, where he made thirty-six league appearances and scored zero goals.

Ahead of the 2021 season, he signed for Norwegian side Kristiansund BK, where he made one league appearance and scored zero goals before being sent on loan to Bryne FK in 2022, where he made fifteen league appearances and scored zero goals. Subsequently, he signed for Swedish side Utsiktens BK in 2023, where he made sixty league appearances and scored zero goals. Following his stint there, he signed for Sandefjord Fotball in 2025.

== International career ==
Hadaya is a Syria international. During March 2024, he was first called up to the Syria national team for the 2026 FIFA World Cup qualification matches.

== Personal life ==
Hadaya was born on 31 August 1998 in Stockholm, Sweden. A native of Märsta, Sweden, he is of Syrian descent through his parents. During the autumn of 2020, he started studying physical education at Nord University in Norway.
