= Al-Hashmi Al-Hussain =

Qatari footballer (born 2003)

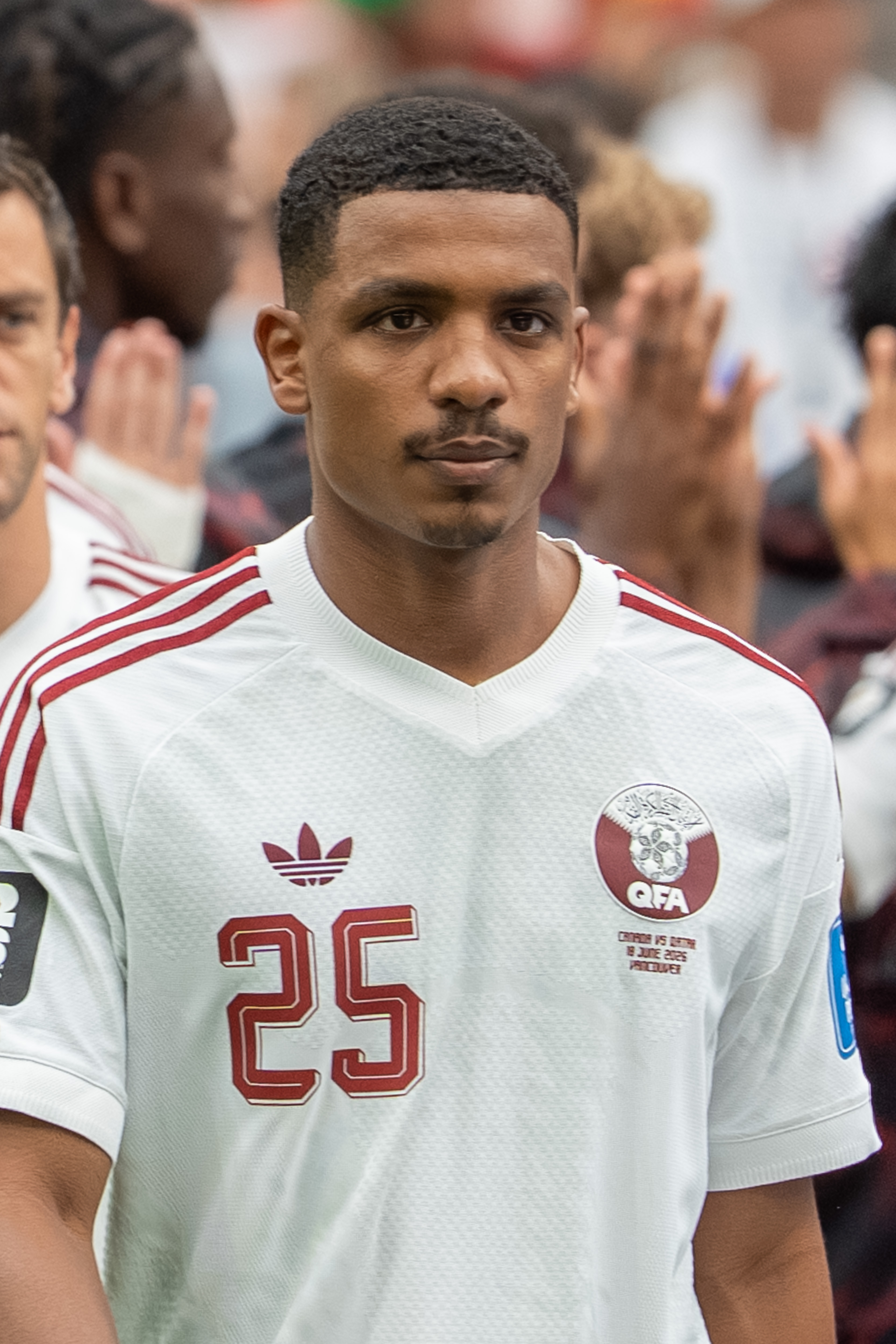
- Al-Hussain with Qatar in 2026

Personal information
- Full name: Al-Hashmi Al-Hussain Mohialdin
- Date of birth: 15 August 2003 (age 23)
- Place of birth: Qatar
- Height: 1.84 m (6 ft 1/2 in)
- Position: Defender

Team information
- Current team: Al-Arabi
- Number: 4

Senior career*
Years	Team	Apps	(Gls)
2021–	Al-Arabi	12	(0)
2023–2024	→ Calahorra B (loan)	22	(0)
2024–2025	→ Alcorcón B (loan)	18	(0)

International career^{‡}
2023	Qatar U20	3	(0)
2024–	Qatar U23	6	(0)
2024–	Qatar	7	(0)
- * Club domestic league appearances and goals as of 26 May 2026 ‡ National team caps and goals as of 28 May 2026

Al-Hashmi Al-Hussain Mohialdin (Arabic: الهاشمي الحسين محي الدين; born 15 August 2003) is a Qatari professional footballer who plays as a defender for Qatar Stars League club Al-Arabi and the Qatar national team.

== Club career ==
Al-Hussain started his career at Al-Arabi SC in Qatar. In 2023, he was loaned to Calahorra B in the Spanish Tercera Federación, before being loaned out to Alcorcón B the following season.

Following the end of his loan at Alcorcón B, he returned to Al-Arabi.

== International career ==
Al-Hussain represented Qatar's under-20 national team at the 2023 AFC U-20 Asian Cup, playing in all three matches as they were eliminated in the group stage. He also played for Qatar's under-23 national team at both the 2024 and 2026 AFC U-23 Asian Cup.

He made his international debut for the Qatar national team on 11 June 2024, in a 2–1 win against India during the second round of 2026 FIFA World Cup qualification, where he assisted Yousef Aymen's controversial goal in the 73rd minute. He also represented Qatar at the 26th Arabian Gulf Cup and the 2025 FIFA Arab Cup, where Qatar finished last in their group both times.

On 12 May 2026, Al-Hussain was included in Qatar's 34-man preliminary squad for the 2026 FIFA World Cup, and remained part of the squad when it was trimmed down to 28 players on 25 May, prior to a friendly against the Republic of Ireland. He was officially included in their final squad on 1 June.
