= Hamed Hamdan =

Palestinian footballer

Personal information
- Date of birth: 3 October 2000 (age 26)
- Place of birth: Gaza, Palestine
- Height: 1.76 m (5 ft 9 in)
- Position: Central midfielder

Team information
- Current team: Pyramids
- Number: 5

Senior career*
Years	Team	Apps	(Gls)
–2018	Gaza SC		
2018–2020	Pyramids		
2019	→ El Entag El Harby (loan)		
2020	→ Tanta (loan)	4	(0)
2020–2022	Al Jazeera SC		
2022–2023	El Magd		
2023–2026	Petrojet	24	(2)
2026–	Pyramids	12	(2)

International career^{‡}
- Palestine U19
2019–2021	Palestine U23		
2025–	Palestine	7	(1)
- * Club domestic league appearances and goals as of 24 August 2026 ‡ National team caps and goals as of 4 December 2025

Hamed Hamdan (Arabic: حامد حمدان; born 3 October 2000) is a Palestinian professional footballer who plays as a central midfielder for Egyptian Premier League club Pyramids and the Palestine national team.

== Club career ==
In January 2018, Hamdan moved to Al Assiouty Sport, which was later rebranded as Pyramids. In January 2019, he joined El Entag El Harby on loan.

On 9 August 2023, he joined Petrojet of the Egyptian Second Division A on a three-year contract. On 16 April 2024, Hamdan scored a goal in Petrojet's 3–0 win over Raya SC, sealing the team's promotion to the Egyptian Premier League after a five-year absence. On 3 January 2026, he rejoined Pyramids by signing a one-and-a-half-year contract with the club.

== International career ==
Hamdan represented the Palestine under-23 national team in the qualifiers for the 2022 AFC U-23 Asian Cup. He was also selected for the WAFF Championship for the same age group, held in Saudi Arabia. He made his debut for the senior Palestine national team in 2025, scoring his first international goal in a 2–2 draw against Tunisia at the 2025 FIFA Arab Cup on 4 December 2025.

== Personal life ==
In a November 2024 interview with The New Arab, Hamdan revealed that his family remained in the Gaza Strip and that, prior to the war, he regularly spoke with them before each match. The conflict resulted in the loss of several relatives and the destruction of their homes.

== Career statistics ==
=== International ===
As of match played 4 December 2025

Appearances and goals by national team and year
National team	Year	Apps	Goals
Palestine	2025	7	1
Total		7	1

Scores and results list Palestine's goal tally first, score column indicates score after each Hamdan goal.

List of international goals scored by Hamed Hamdan
No.	Date	Venue	Opponent	Score	Result	Competition
1.	4 December 2025	Lusail Stadium, Lusail, Qatar	Tunisia	1–2	2–2	2025 FIFA Arab Cup

== Honours ==
Petrojet

- Egyptian Second Division A: 2023–24

Pyramids

- Egypt Cup: 2025–26
