= Musab Al-Battat =

Palestinian footballer (born 1993)

Personal information
- Full name: Musab Al-Battat
- Date of birth: 12 November 1993 (age 33)
- Place of birth: Dhahiriya, West Bank, Palestine
- Height: 1.75 m (5 ft 9 in)
- Position: Right-back

Team information
- Current team: Al-Sailiya

Youth career
- –2013: Shabab Al-Dhahiriya

Senior career*
Years	Team	Apps	(Gls)
2012–2017	Shabab Al-Dhahiriya		
2017–2019	Ahli Al-Khaleel		
2019–2021	Shabab Al-Dhahiriya		
2021–2024	Ceramica Cleopatra FC		
2024	Al-Faisaly		
2025	Al-Wakrah		
2025–2026	Qatar	3	(0)
2026–	Al-Sailiya	4	(0)

International career^{‡}
2013–	Palestine	83	(1)
- * Club domestic league appearances and goals ‡ National team caps and goals as of 14 November 2026

Musab Al-Battat (Arabic: مصعب البطاط; born 12 November 1993) is a Palestinian professional footballer who plays as a right back for Qatar Stars League side Al-Sailiya.

== International career ==
He won his first cap in 2013.

=== International goals ===
Scores and results list Palestine's goal tally first.

Goal	Date	Venue	Opponent	Score	Result	Competition
1.	16 June 2015	Bukit Jalil National Stadium, Kuala Lumpur, Malaysia	Malaysia	1–0	6–0	2018 FIFA World Cup qualification
