= IFK Skövde Fotboll =

Swedish football club

IFK Skövde FK
- Full name: Idrottsföreningen Kamraterna Skövde Fotbollklubb
- Ground: Södermalms IP; Skövde; Sweden
- Chairman: Fredrik Ahlberg
- Manager: Zurab Tsiskaridze
- League: Division 2 Norra Götaland
- 2026: Division 2 Norra Götaland
| Home colours | Away colours |

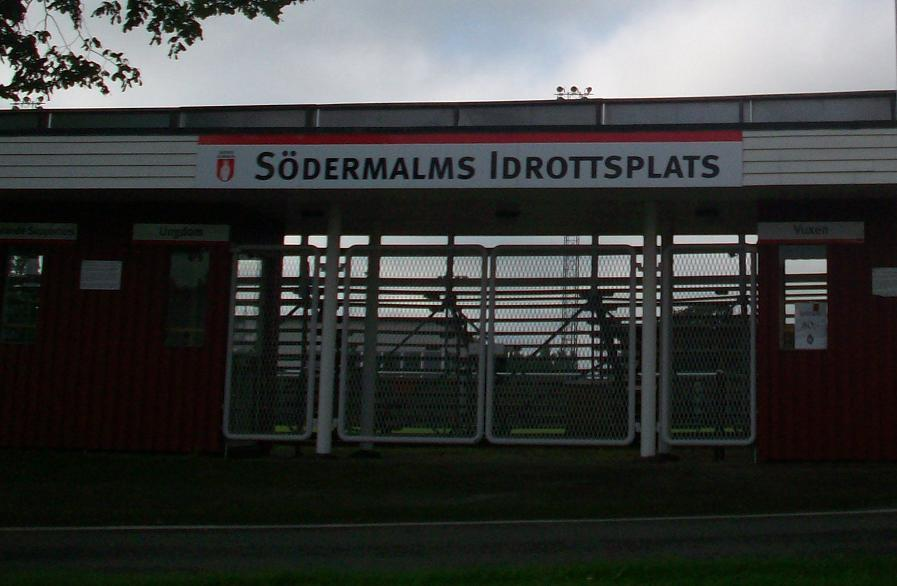
Södermalms IP

IFK Skövde FK is a Swedish football club located in Skövde in Västra Götaland County.

== Background ==
Since their foundation IFK Skövde FK has participated mainly in the middle and lower divisions of the Swedish football league system. The club currently plays in Division 3 Mellersta Götaland which is the fifth tier of Swedish football. They play their home matches at the Södermalms IP in Skövde.

IFK Skövde FK are affiliated to Västergötlands Fotbollförbund.

== Recent history ==
In recent seasons IFK Skövde FK have competed in the following divisions:

2011 – Division III, Mellersta Götaland
2010 – Division IV, Västergötland Norra
2009 – Division IV, Västergötland Norra
2008 – Division IV, Västergötland Norra
2007 – Division IV, Västergötland Norra
2006 – Division IV, Västergötland Norra
2005 – Division IV, Västergötland Norra
2004 – Division IV, Västergötland Norra
2003 – Division IV, Västergötland Norra
2002 – Division III, Mellersta Götaland
2001 – Division III, Mellersta Götaland
2000 – Division IV, Västergötland Norra
1999 – Division IV, Västergötland Norra
1998 – Division IV, Västergötland Norra
1997 – Division III, Mellersta Götaland
1996 – Division III, Mellersta Götaland
1995 – Division III, Mellersta Götaland
1994 – Division III, Mellersta Götaland
1993 – Division III, Mellersta Götaland

== Current squad ==
As of 1 September 2025

Note: Flags indicate national team as defined under FIFA eligibility rules; some limited exceptions apply. Players may hold more than one non-FIFA nationality.

| No. | Pos. | Nation | Player |
|---|---|---|---|
| 1 | GK | SWE | Linus Norrgård |
| 2 | DF | SWE | William Sonntag |
| 3 | DF | SWE | Edwin Mahisa |
| 4 | MF | SWE | Edvin Eriksson |
| 5 | MF | SWE | Djersey Mbuyi Kabong |
| 6 | MF | SWE | Alexander Gerhardsson |
| 7 | MF | SWE | David Björnsson |
| 8 | MF | SWE | Lawan Homi |
| 9 | FW | SWE | Edin Salihovic |
| 10 | MF | SWE | Bilos Yonakhir |
| 11 | MF | SWE | David Frisk |

| No. | Pos. | Nation | Player |
|---|---|---|---|
| 12 | DF | SWE | Andreas Uusitalo |
| 13 | MF | SWE | Melvin Korpås |
| 15 | DF | SWE | Jacob Sundelius |
| 18 | FW | SWE | Lorik Bunjaku (on loan from Degerfors U19) |
| 19 | DF | SWE | Mattias Bahno |
| 21 | FW | SWE | Axel Axelsson |
| 22 | FW | SWE | Jacob Shamoun (on loan from Jönköpings Södra IF) |
| 23 | FW | SWE | Ninous Mama |
| 29 | DF | SWE | William Olsson |
| 31 | GK | SWE | Amar Ibrahimovic |
| 32 | GK | SWE | Aldin Kikic |

== Attendances ==
In recent seasons IFK Skövde FK have had the following average attendances:

| Season | Average attendance | Division / Section | Level |
|---|---|---|---|
| 2008 | Not available | Div 4 Västergötland Norra | Tier 6 |
| 2009 | 80 | Div 4 Västergötland Norra | Tier 6 |
| 2010 | 54 | Div 4 Västergötland Norra | Tier 6 |

* Attendances are provided in the Publikliga sections of the Svenska Fotbollförbundet website.
