= Mohammad Alsalkhadi =

Swedish footballer

Personal information
- Date of birth: 29 July 2001 (age 25)
- Height: 1.77 m (5 ft 10 in)
- Position: Forward

Team information
- Current team: Damac
- Number: 17

Youth career
- –2016: Oskarström IS
- 2018–2020: Halmstads BK

Senior career*
Years	Team	Apps	(Gls)
2017	Oskarström IS	17	(12)
2021–2022	Tvååkers IF	45	(7)
2023	Sandvikens IF	17	(6)
2024–2026	IFK Värnamo	31	(2)
2026–	Damac	0	(0)

International career^{‡}
2024–	Syria	15	(4)
- * Club domestic league appearances and goals as of 29 September 2025 ‡ National team caps and goals as of 31 March 2026

Mohammad Alsakhadi (Arabic: محمد الصلخدي; born 29 July 2001) is a Syrian footballer who plays as a forward for Damac.

== Personal life ==
He grew up in Syria, also spending time in Kuwait where his father worked. Eventually he fled the Syrian Civil War alone. He reached Sweden as a refugee at the age of 13, learning to speak "impeccable Swedish". He started playing football, which allowed him to think about something other than the war experiences.

== Career ==
Alsalkhadi joined Oskarström's club Oskarström IS, and made his debut in senior football in the 2017 Division 6, the eighth tier, where he scored 12 goals in 17 matches. This earned him a place in the academy of Halmstads BK, where he played in the U17 Allsvenskan in 2018 and the next two years in the U19 and U21 Allsvenskans. Then, he was not retained by Halmstad and started his real senior career in Tvååkers IF in the 2021 Ettan.

Joining Sandvikens IF in 2023, he scored twice on his debut. Following six league goals in 2023, Nettavisen reported that Sandefjord Fotball placed a bid on Alsalkhadi. He would be a direct replacement for Danilo Al-Saed, whom Sandefjord had signed from Sandviken as well.

He chose Allsvenskan team IFK Värnamo, citing that their playing style was similar to Sandviken. His first year was hampered by injury in April 2024. He managed to return, and was called up for the first time to play for Syria. He made his international debut in October 2024, in a 1–0 away win over Tajikistan.

In 2025, IFK Värnamo struggled heavily in the league and found themselves last in the table. Their first victory came against Djurgården, when Alsalkhadi scored the 1–0 goal in stoppage time.

== Career statistics ==
=== International ===
As of match played 31 March 2026

Appearances and goals by national team and year
National team	Year	Apps	Goals
Syria	2024	3	0
Syria	2025	12	4
Total		15	4

Scores and results list Syria's goal tally first, score column indicates score after each Alsalkhadi goal.

List of international goals scored by Mohammad Alsalkhadi
No.	Date	Venue	Opponent	Score	Result	Competition
1	4 September 2025	Zayed Sports City Stadium, Dubai, United Arab Emirates	United Arab Emirates	1–0	1–3	Friendly
2	9 October 2025	Prince Abdullah bin Jalawi Stadium, Hofuf, Saudi Arabia	Myanmar	3–0	5–1	2027 AFC Asian Cup qualification
3	14 October 2025	Thuwunna Stadium, Yangon, Myanmar	Myanmar	3–0	3–0	2027 AFC Asian Cup qualification
4	31 March 2026	Prince Abdullah Al-Faisal Sports City Stadium, Jeddah, Saudi Arabia	Afghanistan	1–0	5–1	2027 AFC Asian Cup qualification
