= Issa Laye =

Qatari footballer (born 1997)

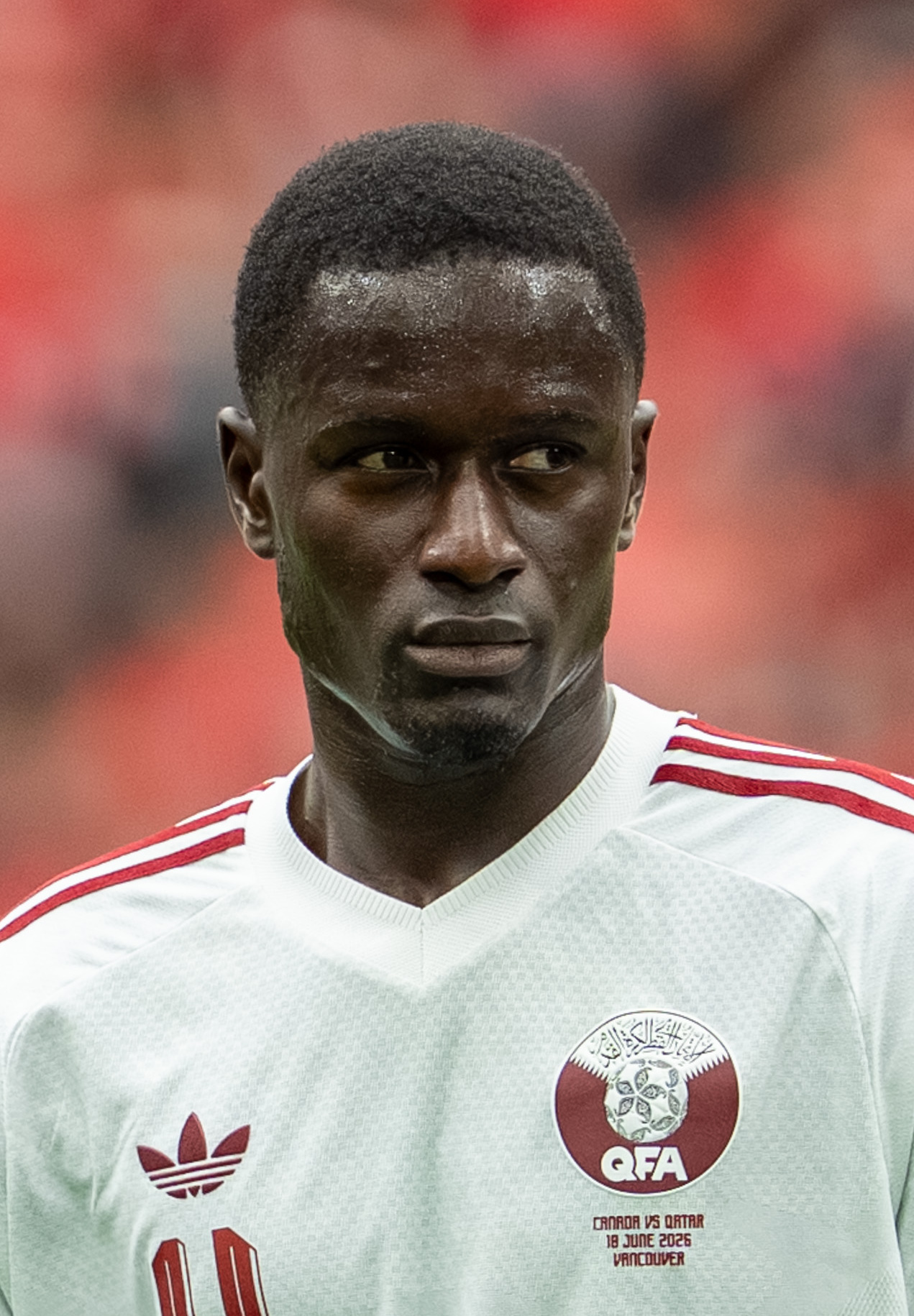
- Laye with Qatar in 2026

Personal information
- Full name: Gueye Seydinaissa Laye
- Date of birth: 22 December 1997 (age 28)
- Place of birth: Senegal
- Height: 1.78 m (5 ft 10 in)
- Positions: Center-back; defensive midfielder

Team information
- Current team: Al-Arabi
- Number: 19

Senior career*
Years	Team	Apps	(Gls)
2020–2025	Lusail	33	(2)
2024–2025	→ Al-Shamal (loan)	0	(0)
2025	→ Al-Arabi (loan)	6	(0)
2025–	Al-Arabi	7	(0)

International career^{‡}
2025–	Qatar	10	(0)
- * Club domestic league appearances and goals as of 17 January 2026 ‡ National team caps and goals as of 13 November 2026

Gueye Seydinaissa Laye (Arabic: عيسى لاي; born 22 December 1997) is a professional footballer who plays as a center back or defensive midfielder for Qatar Stars League club Al-Arabi. Born in Senegal, he plays for the Qatar national team.

== Club career ==
On 1 July 2020, Laye joined side Lusail in Qatari Second Division. On 10 September 2024, Laye joined side Al-Shamal in Qatar Stars League on a one-year loan On 30 January 2025, Laye joined side Al-Arabi in Qatar Stars League on a half-year loan. On 18 July 2025, Laye moved to Al-Arabi permanently and signed a five-year contract.

== International career ==
In 2025, Laye obtained Qatari citizenship and was selected to join the Qatar national team to participate at the 2025 FIFA Arab Cup.
