= Moutaz Neffati =

Tunisian footballer

Personal information
- Date of birth: 4 September 2004 (age 22)
- Place of birth: Norrköping, Sweden
- Height: 1.82 m (6 ft 0 in)
- Position: Right-back

Team information
- Current team: IFK Norrköping
- Number: 37

Youth career
- Hageby IF
- 2011–2023: IFK Norrköping

Senior career*
Years	Team	Apps	(Gls)
2023–	IFK Norrköping	68	(7)
2023	→ IF Sylvia (loan)	7	(0)
2024	→ KR (loan)	5	(0)

International career^{‡}
2024	Sweden U19	2	(1)
2025	Sweden U21	1	(0)
2025–	Tunisia	5	(0)
- * Club domestic league appearances and goals as of 11 November 2026 ‡ National team caps and goals as of 17:20, 1 September 2026 (UTC)

Moutaz Neffati (Arabic: معتز نفّاتي; born 4 September 2004) is a professional footballer who plays as a right-back for Superettan club IFK Norrköping. Born in Sweden, he plays for the Tunisia national team.

== Club career ==
A youth product of Hageby IF, Neffati finished his development with Norrköping. On 10 June 2022, he signed his first professional contract with Norrköping for the 2023 season. He went on loan with Sylvia in the Ettan tournament. He returned to Norrköping and on 17 November 2023 signed a professional contract with the club for 3 seasons. On 25 April 2024, he joined the Icelandic club KR on loan for 2 months. He returned to Norrköping in 2024, where he was integrated with the first team. On 13 September 2025, he extended his contract with Norrköping until 2028.

== International career ==
Born in Sweden, Neffati is of Tunisian descent and holds dual Swedish-Tunisian citizenship. In March 2025, he debuted for the Sweden U21s. In August 2025, he opted to play for the Tunisia national team. He made his debut for Tunisia in October 2025.

On 15 May 2026, Neffati was named in the Tunisia squad for the 2026 FIFA World Cup.
