= Housseine Zakouani =

Footballer (born 1998)

Personal information
- Full name: Housseine Zakouani Saïd
- Date of birth: 30 April 1998 (age 28)
- Place of birth: Marseille, France
- Height: 1.79 m (5 ft 10 in)
- Position: Forward

Youth career
- –2018: Marseille

Senior career*
Years	Team	Apps	(Gls)
2016–2018	Marseille B	47	(2)
2019	Trikala	2	(0)
2019–2021	Aubagne	14	(0)
2021–2024	Jura Sud	64	(9)
2024–2025	Thionville	2	(0)
2025	Hyères	7	(0)
2025–2026	Châteauroux	12	(2)
2026	Al-Zulfi	13	(0)

International career
2020–	Comoros	2	(0)
- * Club domestic league appearances and goals as of 3 December 2025

Housseine Zakouani Saïd (born 30 April 1998) is a professional footballer who plays as a forward. Born in France, he plays for the Comoros national team.

== Career ==
On 11 October 2019, Zakouani joined Aubagne in the Championnat National 3.

== International career ==
Zakouani was born in France and is of Comorian descent. He debuted for the Comoros national team in a 2–1 friendly win over Libya on 11 October 2020.

== Career statistics ==
=== Club ===
As of match played 16 April 2022

Club	Season	League			National Cup		Other		Total	
Club	Season	Division	Apps	Goals	Apps	Goals	Apps	Goals	Apps	Goals
Marseille B	2015–16	Championnat de France Amateur	1	0	—		—		1	0
Marseille B	2016–17	Championnat de France Amateur	22	1	—		—		22	1
Marseille B	2017–18	Championnat National 2	24	1	—		—		24	1
Marseille B	Total		47	2	—		—		47	2
Trikala	2018–19	Football League	2	0	0	0	0	0	2	0
Aubagne	2019–20	Championnat National 3	8	0	0	0	—		8	0
Aubagne	2020–21	Championnat National 2	6	0	1	0	—		7	0
Aubagne	Total		14	0	1	0	—		15	0
Jura Sud	2021–22	Championnat National 2	21	2	4	0	—		25	2
Career total			84	2	5	0	0	0	89	2
