= Emilio Saba =

Palestinian footballer (born 2001)

Personal information
- Full name: Emilio Esteban Saba Fassioli
- Date of birth: 26 March 2001 (age 25)
- Place of birth: Lima, Peru
- Height: 1.80 m (5 ft 11 in)
- Position: Right back

Team information
- Current team: Sport Boys (on loan from Melgar)
- Number: 6

Youth career
- Esther Grande
- 2018: Sport Boys
- 2018: Alianza Lima
- 2019: Melgar

Senior career*
Years	Team	Apps	(Gls)
2020–	Melgar	4	(0)
2021	→ Deportivo Municipal (loan)	6	(0)
2022	→ UTC Cajamarca (loan)	17	(0)
2023	→ ADT (loan)	28	(0)
2024	→ Carlos A. Mannucci (loan)	25	(0)
2025–	→ Sport Boys (loan)	10	(0)

International career^{‡}
2023–2024	Peru U23	8	(1)
2025–	Palestine	1	(0)
- * Club domestic league appearances and goals as of 10:27, 18 October 2025 (UTC) ‡ National team caps and goals as of 09:34, 19 October 2024 (UTC)

Emilio Esteban Saba Fassioli (born 26 March 2001) is a professional footballer who plays as a right back for Peruvian Primera División club Sport Boys, on loan from Melgar. Born in Peru, he plays for the Palestine national team.

He has played 90 games in the Peruvian top-flight for Melgar, Deportivo Municipal, UTC Cajamarca, ADT, Carlos A. Mannucci and Sport Boys.

== Club career ==
=== Early career ===
Born in Lima, Saba played for the youth team of Esther Grande. He played on the right side of midfield or on the wing, scoring 28 times in 2017, and occasionally played in age groups one or two years older than his age. In 2018, he also played for Sport Boys as part of an agreement between the two clubs, and joined Alianza Lima in August.

In October 2018, Saba went on trial for two weeks at Werder Bremen of the German Bundesliga. He trained with players including Peruvian veteran Claudio Pizarro.

=== Melgar ===
When Esther Grande manager Marco Valencia moved to Melgar in 2019, he signed Saba, who helped the reserve team to third place that year. When the Torneo de Promoción y Reserva was suspended in 2020 due to the COVID-19 pandemic, Saba was added to the first team and made his professional debut in the Peruvian Primera División on 27 August in a 2–0 home loss to Carlos Stein, playing the last 25 minutes as a substitute for Diego Manicero.

In March 2021, Saba was loaned to Deportivo Municipal. For the following two years he also moved temporarily, respectively to UTC Cajamarca and ADT; with the latter, he played 28 games in 2023 as they qualified for the Copa Sudamericana for the first time.

Saba was linked with a return to Alianza for 2023, but opted to go on loan again, this time to Carlos A. Mannucci.

== International career ==
Saba was included in the Peru under-20 team, but COVID conditions meant that the team played no official matches during his spell. They did play training matches against other age groups of the Peruvian Football Federation, and these led to him preferring a right-back position.

Saba was called up to the senior team ahead of 2026 FIFA World Cup qualifiers against Bolivia and Venezuela in November 2023. Manager Juan Reynoso excluded players from Alianza or Universitario due to the national finals.

In December 2023, Saba was called up for the Peru under-23 team for four friendly matches. He scored a penalty kick in a 4–0 win over Bolivia. The following month, he was the captain at the 2024 CONMEBOL Pre-Olympic Tournament in Venezuela, from which his team did not qualify for the Olympic event.

Saba was approached by the Palestine national team in 2025, as he also holds that country's nationality. He rejected the offer and said he was waiting to be called up for Peru. On 17 October 2025, his request to switch international allegiance to Palestine was approved by FIFA. He made his debut on 15 November in a 3–0 loss away to the unofficial Basque Country national team. The following month, he played at the 2025 FIFA Arab Cup in Qatar.
