= Ayoub Al-Oui =

Qatari footballer (born 2005)

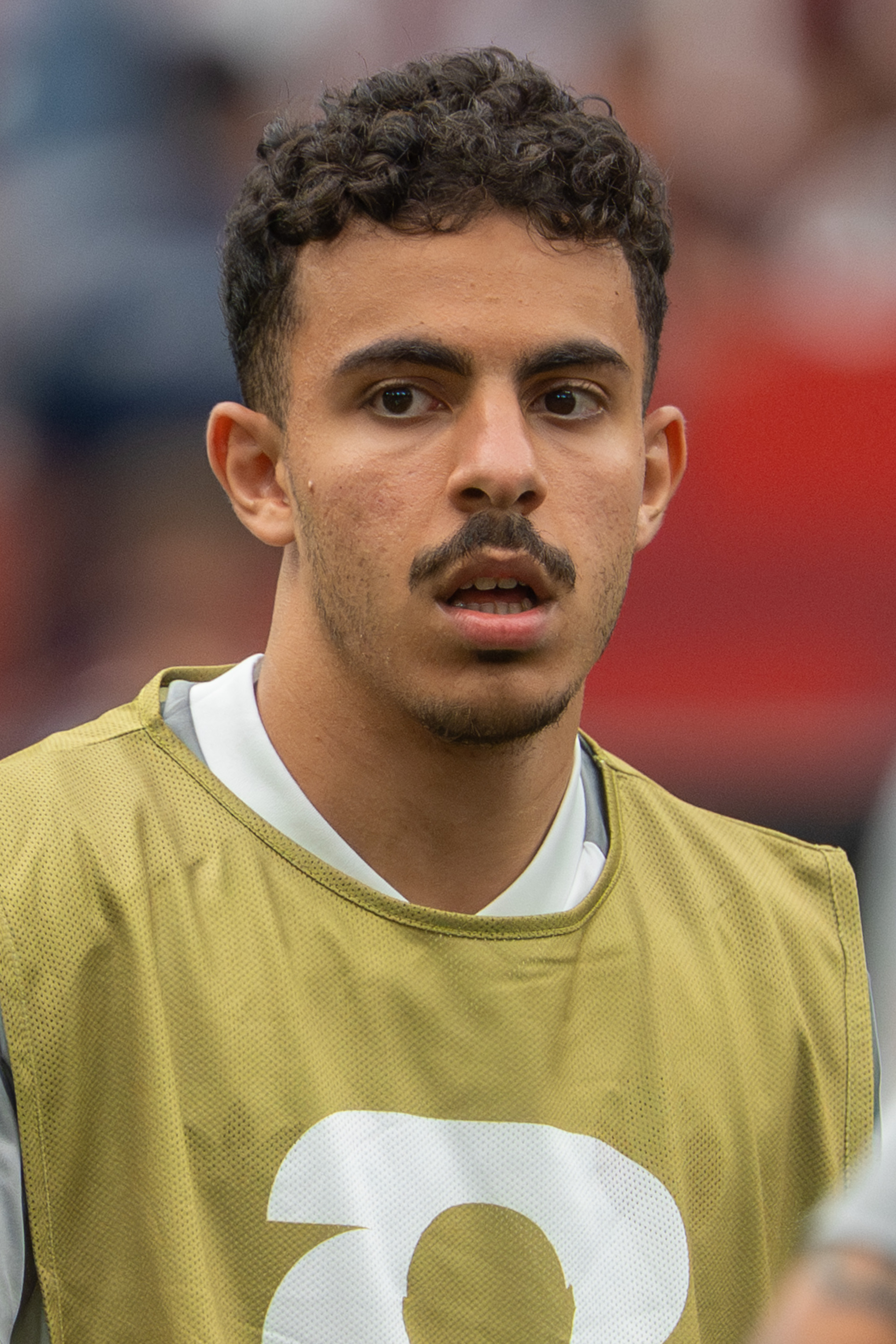
- Al-Oui with Qatar in 2026

Personal information
- Full name: Ayoub Mohamed Al-Oui
- Date of birth: 11 March 2005 (age 21)
- Place of birth: Qatar
- Height: 1.87 m (6 ft 2 in)
- Positions: Right-back; center-back

Team information
- Current team: Al-Gharafa
- Number: 18

Youth career
- –2022: Al-Gharafa

Senior career*
Years	Team	Apps	(Gls)
2022–	Al-Gharafa	28	(1)

International career^{‡}
2023–2025	Qatar U20	11	(0)
2025–	Qatar U23	10	(0)
2025–	Qatar	4	(0)
- * Club domestic league appearances and goals as of 10 May 2026 ‡ National team caps and goals as of 7 December 2025

Ayoub Mohamed Al-Oui (Arabic: أيوب محمد العلوي; born 11 March 2005) is a Qatari professional footballer who plays as a right-back or center-back for Qatar Stars League club Al-Gharafa and Qatar national team.

== Club career ==
A youth product of Al-Gharafa, Al-Oui emerged as the team starter in the 2025–26 season and played an important role helping the team win the 2026 Amir of Qatar Cup. Therefore, he was named the Best U-23 Player of the Season in the Qatar Stars League.

== International career ==
On 8 October 2025, Al-Oui made his international debut with Qatar in the 2026 World Cup qualifiers game against Oman. Later in the year, he featured at the 2025 FIFA Arab Cup.

== Personal life ==
Born in Qatar, Al-Oui is of Tunisian descent.

== Honours ==
Al-Gharafa

- Amir of Qatar Cup: 2025, 2026

Individual

- Qatar Stars League Best U23 Player of the Season: 2025–26
