= Abdelmajid Djae =

Footballer (born 2005)

Personal information
- Date of birth: 3 June 2005 (age 21)
- Place of birth: Aubervilliers, France
- Height: 1.87 m (6 ft 2 in)
- Position: Winger

Team information
- Current team: Dijon

Youth career
- FC Bourget
- 2020–2024: Lille

Senior career*
Years	Team	Apps	(Gls)
2024–	Dijon II	20	(2)
2024–	Dijon	19	(1)
2026	→ Limonest (loan)	8	(0)

International career^{‡}
2025–	Comoros	1	(0)
- * Club domestic league appearances and goals as of 16 May 2026 ‡ National team caps and goals as of 21:18, 28 November 2025 (UTC)

Abdelmajid Djae (born 5 June 2005) is a professional footballer who plays as a winger for Ligue 2 club Dijon. Born in France, he plays for the Comoros national team.

== Club career ==
Djae is a product of the academies of the French clubs FC Bourget and Lille. On 11 December 2024, he signed his first professional contract with Lille until 2027. On 12 January 2024, he transferred to Dijon in the Championnat National.

== International career ==
Born in France, Djae is of Comorian descent. He debuted with the Comoros national team for a 4–4 (4–2) 2025 FIFA Arab Cup qualification win over Yemen on 26 November 2025, where he scored in the penalty shootout. He made the final Comoros squad for the 2025 FIFA Arab Cup.
