= Ameed Sawafta =

Palestinian footballer (born 2000)

Personal information
- Full name: Ameed Thaer Sawafta
- Date of birth: 10 July 2000 (age 26)
- Place of birth: Tubas, Palestine
- Height: 1.81 m (5 ft 11 in)
- Position: Midfielder

Team information
- Current team: Al Masry
- Number: 18

Senior career*
Years	Team	Apps	(Gls)
2015–2022	Tubas		
2022–2023	Naft Maysan	19	
2023–2024	Markaz Balata		
2024	Al-Salt		
2024–2025	Al Ittihad Tripoli		
2025	Al-Waab	5	(0)
2025–2026	Al-Salt	9	(1)
2026–	Al Masry	6	(0)

International career^{‡}
2015–2016	Palestine U16		
2021–	Palestine U23		
2023–	Palestine	16	(0)
- * Club domestic league appearances and goals as of 27 April 2026 ‡ National team caps and goals as of 14 November 2026

Ameed Sawafta (Arabic: عميد صوافطة; born 10 July 2000) is a Palestinian footballer who plays as a midfielder for the Palestine national team and Al Masry.

== Club career ==
On 25 July 2022, he signed for Iraqi outfit Naft Maysan on a one-year contract.

== International career ==
Sawafta made his full international debut on 25 March 2023 versus Bahrain in a 2–1 win.

== Honours ==
Al Masry

- Egyptian League Cup: 2025–26
