= José Lana =

Spanish football manager

Personal information
- Full name: José Jacobus Lana Fernández
- Date of birth: 1 February 1975 (age 51)
- Place of birth: Mieres, Spain

Team information
- Current team: Syria (head coach)

Managerial career
- Years: Team
- 2016–2018: Racing (assistant)
- 2022–2023: Spain U16
- 2023: Spain U17
- 2023–2024: Spain U19
- 2024–: Syria
Medal record
Men's football
Representing Spain (as manager)
UEFA European Under-19 Championship
Winner	2024 Northern Ireland

José Lana (born 1 February 1975) is a Spanish professional football manager currently managing the Syria national team, He formerly managed Spanish youth teams.

== Managerial career ==
=== In Spain ===
Lana began his career as an assistant manager at Racing Santander with Ángel Viadero. He then went on to manage the Spain U15 and U16 team before being assigned to the U17 team. In 2023, he coached the U19 team ahead of the U19 Euros, which he won in 2024.

=== Syria ===
On 22 August 2024, Lana signed a three-year contract to manage the Syria national team. Lana's first matches as coach of Syria took place during the 2024 Intercontinental Cup. His first match in charge saw the Qasioun Eagles win 2–0 against Mauritius, giving Syria first place, with India and Mauritius having one point after a goalless draw between them earlier in the tournament. In the following game against India, Syria only required a draw to win the competition. Despite this, Lana chose to play in attacking style and Syria thrashed India 3–0, winning the cup. This also meant Lana won his first cup after only 17 days in charge, and Syria's first title in 12 years. Lana also guided Syria to top the group in the third round of the 2027 AFC Asian Cup qualification which saw Syria qualified to the 2027 AFC Asian Cup.

== Honours ==
=== Manager ===
Spain U19

- UEFA European Under-19 Championship: 2024

Syria

- Intercontinental Cup: 2024
