= Antonio Yakoub =

Syrian footballer (born 2002)

Antonio Yakoub انطونيو يعقوب
Personal information
- Full name: Antonio Tino Lucas Yakoub
- Date of birth: 12 June 2002 (age 24)
- Place of birth: Södertälje, Sweden
- Height: 1.80 m (5 ft 11 in)
- Position: Forward

Team information
- Current team: Örebro
- Number: 9

Youth career
- –2017: Djurgårdens IF
- 2018–2019: Assyriska FF

Senior career*
Years	Team	Apps	(Gls)
2018–2022	Assyriska FF	60	(33)
2022	→ Sirius (loan)	3	(0)
2022	→ Gefle (loan)	14	(6)
2023–2024	Gefle	32	(3)
2023	→ Öster (loan)	7	(0)
2024	Nordic United	14	(10)
2025–	Örebro	54	(12)

International career^{‡}
2021	Finland U20	1	(0)
2023–	Syria U23	1	(0)
2023–	Syria	7	(0)
- * Club domestic league appearances and goals as of 12 November 2026 ‡ National team caps and goals as of 11 December 2025

Antonio Tino Lucas Yakoub (Arabic: انطونيو تينو لوكاس يعقوب; born 12 June 2002) is a professional footballer who plays as a forward for Superettan club Örebro. Born in Sweden, he represents the Syria national team.

== Club career ==
Yakoub started playing football in a youth sector of Djurgårdens IF, before joining Assyriska FF in 2018.

In March 2022, Yakoub was loaned out to Allsvenskan club IK Sirius with a purchase option, and later made his league debut for the club.

In July 2022, Sirius loaned him further to Gefle IF for the rest of the 2022 Ettan season. After the season, Gefle won a promotion to Superettan, and acquired Yakoub from Assyriska on a permanent deal for an undisclosed fee, after Sirius hadn't exercised their option. In August 2023, Yakoub was loaned out to fellow Superettan side Östers IF for the remainder of the 2023 season.

== International career ==
Yakoub is eligible to represent Sweden, Finland and Syria, and has made one appearance for Finland under-20 national team in 2021.

Yakoub was named in the Syria senior national team squad for the postponed 2023 AFC Asian Cup in January 2024. He made his full international debut for Syria in the tournament, as a substitute in a 1–0 loss against Australia on 18 January.

== Personal life ==
Yakoub was born in Sweden to Assyrian mother and Finnish father.

== Career statistics ==
=== Club ===
As of 5 November 2024.

Appearances and goals by club, season and competition
Club	Season	League			National cup (Note: Includes Svenska Cupen)		Other		Europe		Total	
Club	Season	Division	Apps	Goals	Apps	Goals	Apps	Goals	Apps	Goals	Apps	Goals
Assyriska FF	2018	Swedish Division 1	2	0	0	0	—		—		2	0
Assyriska FF	2019	Swedish Division 2	17	9	0	0	—		—		17	9
Assyriska FF	2020	Swedish Division 2	13	10	0	0	—		—		13	10
Assyriska FF	2021	Ettan	28	14	0	0	—		—		28	14
Assyriska FF	Total		60	33	0	0	0	0	0	0	60	33
Sirius (loan)	2022	Allsvenskan	3	0	0	0	—		—		3	0
Gefle (loan)	2022	Ettan	14	6	0	0	—		—		14	6
Gefle	2023	Superettan	18	3	1	1	—		—		19	4
Gefle	2024	Superettan	14	0	3	0	—		—		17	0
Gefle	Total		32	3	4	1	0	0	0	0	36	4
Öster (loan)	2023	Superettan	7	0	0	0	—		—		7	0
Nordic United	2024	Ettan	14	10	0	0	—		—		14	10
Örebro	2025	Superettan	0	0	0	0	–		–		0	0
Career total			127	50	4	1	0	0	0	0	131	51

=== International ===
As of 3 February 2025

Syria
Year	Apps	Goals
2024	3 (Note: 1 Appearance in the 2023 AFC Asian Cup and 2026 FIFA World Cup Qualification.)	0
Total	3	0
