= Ahmad Faqa =

Syrian footballer (born 2003)

Personal information
- Date of birth: 10 January 2003 (age 23)
- Place of birth: Qamishli, Syria
- Height: 1.87 m (6 ft 2 in)
- Position: Defender

Team information
- Current team: Degerfors IF

Youth career
- Vasalund IF
- AIK
- Bromstens IK
- 2017–2021: AIK

Senior career*
Years	Team	Apps	(Gls)
2022–2026	AIK	11	(0)
2022	→ Västerås (loan)	7	(0)
2022	→ Sandvikens IF (loan)	12	(1)
2023	→ HK (loan)	25	(2)
2025	→ FH (loan)	26	(0)
2026–	Degerfors IF	7	(0)

International career^{‡}
2024–	Syria	20	(2)
- * Club domestic league appearances and goals as of 8 July 2026 ‡ National team caps and goals as of 17 November 2026

Ahmad Faqa (Arabic: أحمد فقا, Arabic pronunciation: [ˈʔaħmad ˈfaʔa]; born 10 January 2003) is a Syrian professional footballer who plays as a defender for Allsvenskan club Degerfors and the Syria national team.

== Early and personal life ==
Faqa was born in Qamishli, Syria on 10 January 2003. His family moved to Sweden in 2012, settling in Rinkeby, near Stockholm.

== Club career ==
Faqa spent his early career with Vasalund IF, AIK and Bromstens IK, where he initially played as a striker.

He returned to AIK at under-15 level. He made his senior debut for AIK in February 2022, in the Swedish Cup, and in March 2022 he signed a new contract with AIK until the end of the 2026 season, before moving on loan to Västerås.

In July 2022 he signed on loan for Sandvikens IF.

In March 2023 he signed on loan for Icelandic club HK until the end of the season.

On his return to AIK in the 2024 season, he made a number of appearances.

In April 2025 he moved on loan to Icelandic club FH, until the end of July. In July, KR were reported to be trying to sign Faqa.

On 22 July 2026, he signed with Degerfors IF.

== International career ==
Faqa made his international debut for Syria in 2024, scoring his first goal in March 2025.
