= Abdulrazzak Al-Mohammad =

Syrian footballer (born 1995)

Personal information
- Date of birth: 15 January 1995 (age 31)
- Place of birth: Syria
- Position: Centre-back

Team information
- Current team: Al-Ittihad Ahli

Senior career*
Years	Team	Apps	(Gls)
2017–2018	Nawair		
2018–2019	Taliya		
2019–2023	Tishreen		
2022	→Al-Karkh (loan)		
2023–2024	Al-Fotuwa		
2024–2025	Al-Nahda		
2025–	Al-Ittihad Ahli		

International career^{‡}
2019–	Syria	21	(0)
- * Club domestic league appearances and goals as of 23:55, 21 December 2025 (UTC) ‡ National team caps and goals as of 17 November 2026 (UTC)

Abdulrazzak Al-Mohammad (Arabic: عبد الرزاق المحمد; born 16 January 1995) is a Syrian professional footballer who plays as a centre-back for Syrian Premier League club Al-Ittihad Ahli and the Syria national team.

== Club career ==
Al-Mohammad began his senior career in the Syrian Premier League with Nawair and Taliya. In 2019, he moved to Tishreen where he won three consecutive Syrian Premier Leagues. On 2022, he had a stint with the Iraq Stars League club Al-Karkh, before returning to Tishreen later that year to win a Syrian Cup. He followed that up with a move to Al-Fotuwa, before moving to Oman with Al-Nahda on 6 August 2024. On 13 May 2025, he returned to Syria with Al Ittihad.

== International career ==
Al-Mohammad was called up to the Syria national team for the 2025 FIFA Arab Cup.

== Honours ==
Tishreen SC

- Syrian Premier League: 2019–20, 2020–21, 2021–22
- Syrian Cup: 2023

Al-Fotuwa

- Syrian Premier League: 2023–24
