= Ihab Abu Jazar =

Palestinian football manager (born 1980)

Personal information
- Date of birth: 1 September 1980 (age 46)
- Place of birth: Rafah, Palestine
- Height: 1.87 m (6 ft 2 in)
- Position: Left-back

Team information
- Current team: Palestine

Youth career
- 1995–: Shabab Rafah

Senior career*
Years	Team	Apps	(Gls)
2003–2005	Al-Hilal Gaza		
2005–2009	Shabab Rafah		
2009–2010	→ Hilal Al-Quds (loan)		
2010–2014	Shabab Rafah		
2014–2015	Markaz Shabab Al-Am'ari		
2015–2016	Shabab Alsamu		
2016–2017	Markaz Shabab Al-Am'ari		

International career
- Palestine U23
2001–2005	Palestine	11	(0)

Managerial career
- 2017–2021: Markaz Shabab Al-Am'ari
- 2020–2024: Palestine U23
- 2024–: Palestine
- * Club domestic league appearances and goals

Ihab Abu Jazar (born 1 September 1980) is a former Palestinian footballer and a professional football coach. He currently serves as the head coach of the Palestine national football team.

== Career ==
In May 2017, he announced his retirement from professional football and subsequently took on the position of head coach at Markaz Shabab Al-Am'ari. In December 2020, he succeeded Ayman Sandouqa at the helm of the Palestine U-23 national team, continuing in his role with Al-Am'ari for several months.

On 3 December 2024, he was appointed to succeed Makram Daboub as head coach of the Palestine national football team, which is competing in the qualification campaign for the 2026 FIFA World Cup.

== Honours ==
Shabab Rafah

- Gaza Strip Premier League: 2012–13, 2013–14
- Gaza Strip Super Cup: 2013
