= Mohamed Manai =

Qatari footballer (born 2003)

Personal information
- Full name: Mohamed Naceur Manai
- Date of birth: 25 October 2002 (age 24)
- Place of birth: Tunisia
- Height: 1.89 m (6 ft 2 in)
- Position: Defensive midfielder

Team information
- Current team: Al-Shamal
- Number: 12

Youth career
- –2021: Al-Sadd

Senior career*
Years	Team	Apps	(Gls)
2021–2024	Al-Sadd	6	(0)
2023–2024	→ Al-Markhiya (loan)	2	(0)
2024–	Al-Shamal	37	(6)

International career^{‡}
2023–2024	Qatar U23	9	(1)
2025–	Qatar	8	(0)
- * Club domestic league appearances and goals as of 10 May 2026 ‡ National team caps and goals as of 7 December 2025

Mohamed Naceur Manai (Arabic: محمد مناعي; born 25 October 2002) is a professional footballer who plays as a defensive midfielder for Qatar Stars League club Al-Shamal, on loan from Al-Sadd, and the Qatar national team. Born in Tunisia, he represents the Qatari national team.

== Club career ==
A product of the Al-Sadd academy, Manai was loaned to Al-Shamal in 2024. At the 2024–25 Qatar Stars League, he was named the Best U-23 Player of the Season.

== International career ==
In 2025, Manai was named in Qatar national team's squad to participate at the 2025 FIFA Arab Cup.

Manai was selected for the Qatar national team squad for the 2026 FIFA World Cup.

== Personal life ==
Born in Tunisia, Manai received Qatari nationality to play for Qatar.

== Honours ==
Al-Sadd

- Qatar Stars League: 2020–21, 2021–22
- Qatar Cup: 2021

Individual

- Qatar Stars League Best U23 Player of the Season: 2024–25
