= Mohammed Saleh (footballer, born 1993) =

Palestinian footballer (born 1993)

Personal information
- Full name: Mohammed Nuaman Abdelfatah Saleh
- Date of birth: 18 July 1993 (age 33)
- Place of birth: Gaza, Palestine
- Height: 1.85 m (6 ft 1 in)
- Position: Centre-back

Team information
- Current team: Al Rayyan
- Number: 55

Senior career*
Years	Team	Apps	(Gls)
2013–2015	Gaza Sport		
2015–2018	Ahli Al-Khaleel		
2018–2019	Floriana	6	(0)
2019–2021	Al Masry	9	(1)
2021–2022	El-Qanah	7	(1)
2022	→ Eastern Company SC	22	(9)
2022–2023	Al Ittihad Alexandria	15	(0)
2024	Muaither	2	(0)
2024–	Al Rayyan	16	(1)

International career^{‡}
2016–	Palestine	35	(0)
- * Club domestic league appearances and goals as of 30 August 2022 ‡ National team caps and goals as of 29 January 2024

Mohammed Nuaman Abdelfatah Saleh (Arabic: مُحَمَّد نُعْمَان عَبْد الْفَتَّاح صَالِح; born 18 July 1993) is a Palestinian professional footballer who plays as a centre-back for Al Rayyan and the Palestine national team.

== Club career ==
Mohammed Saleh started his footballing career in Gaza, where he was born. He joined Gaza Sports, a team competing in Gaza Strip Premier League. After two seasons, he joined Ahli Al-Khaleel, a football club in competing in West Bank Premier League. In his first season in Ahli Al-Khaleel, the club won the West Bank Premier League, the West Bank Cup, the Palestine Cup and the West Bank Super Cup. After three successful seasons, Saleh joined Floriana F.C. in Malta. Saleh then joined Al Masry SC and El-Qanah FC after Floriana. In 2022, Saleh was loaned to Eastern Company SC in Cairo, Egypt. In just half a year, Saleh scored 9 goals for Eastern Company SC, with an outstanding bicycle kick goal. After a successful half-season in Eastern Company SC, Saleh joined Al Ittihad Alexandria Club in Egypt. Due to lack of play time, Saleh decided to leave Egypt and went to Qatar and joined Muaither SC. In 2024 summer, Saleh joined Al-Rayyan SC which competes in Qatar Stars League, which he currently plays for.

== International career ==
Mohammed Saleh forms part of the Palestine national football team. He has played in the 2019 Asian Cup and the 2023 Asian Cup.

== Honours ==
Ahli Al-Khaleel

- Palestine Cup: 2016–17
- West Bank Premier League runner-up: 2017–18
- Qatari Stars Cup: 2025–26
