= Milad Termanini =

Palestinian footballer (born 1998)

Personal information
- Full name: Michel Termanini
- Date of birth: 8 May 1998 (age 28)
- Place of birth: Malmö, Sweden
- Height: 1.85 m (6 ft 1 in)
- Position: Centre back

Team information
- Current team: Al-Shamal
- Number: 23

Youth career
- Olympic
- LB07
- 2016–2017: Eskilstuna

Senior career*
Years	Team	Apps	(Gls)
2017–2018	Eskilstuna	3	(0)
2017	→ Syrianska (loan)	4	(0)
2018	Hilal Al-Quds		
2019	Torns IF	8	(0)
2019–2020	ZED		
2020–2021	Al-Nasr		
2021–2024	Kazma		
2025	Al-Wakrah	0	(0)
2025–	Al-Shamal	23	(0)

International career^{‡}
2018	Palestine U23	9	(0)
2018–	Palestine	24	(2)
- * Club domestic league appearances and goals as of 01:40, 28 October 2026 (UTC) ‡ National team caps and goals as of 28 October 2026

Milad "Dado" Termanini (born 8 May 1998; Arabic: ميلاد تيرمانيني) is a professional footballer who plays as a defender. Born in Sweden, he plays for the Palestine national team.

== Professional career ==
Termanini started playing football when he was ten and started his career at BK Olympic in Malmö. Termanini joined AFC Eskilstuna at the age of 17 from LB07 Termanini made his professional debut with Ekstilstuna in a 2–1 Allsvenskan win over Kalmar FF on 15 July 2017.

Temanini moved back to Palestine, when he signed for Hilal Al-Quds on 25 September 2018. On 21 April 2019, he returned to Sweden and joined Torns IF. On 18 August 2020, he moved to Egypt and joined ZED FC. after four months, he signed a one-year contract with Oman Professional League side Al-Nasr on 13 December 2020.

On 1 July 2021, he contracted with Kazma SC until the end of the 2021–22 season.

== International career ==
Termanini represented the Palestine U23s at the 2018 AFC U-23 Championship.

On 11 May 2018, Termanini debuted with the Palestine national football team in a friendly 2–0 loss against Kuwait.

=== International goals ===
List of international goals scored by Milad Termanini
No.	Date	Venue	Opponent	Score	Result	Competition
1	25 March 2023	Bahrain National Stadium, Riffa, Bahrain	Bahrain	1–0	2–1	Friendly
2	26 March 2024	Bashundhara Kings Arena, Dhaka, Bangladesh	Bangladesh	1–0	1–0	2026 FIFA World Cup qualification

== Honours ==
Kazma

- Kuwait Emir Cup: 2022
- Egyptian Second Division: 2022–23
