= Ameed Mahajna =

Palestinian footballer

Personal information
- Date of birth: 11 October 1996 (age 30)
- Place of birth: Umm al-Fahm, Israel
- Height: 1.87 m (6 ft 2 in)
- Positions: Centre back; defensive midfielder

Team information
- Current team: Al-Arabi
- Number: 20

Youth career
- 2005–2011: F.C. Umm al-Fahm
- 2011–2013: Maccabi Umm al-Fahm
- 2013–2016: Beitar Tubruk

Senior career*
Years	Team	Apps	(Gls)
2016–2017	Hapoel Ra'anana	0	(0)
2017–2018	Hapoel Jerusalem	11	(0)
2018–2019	Hapoel Acre	42	(1)
2019–2021	F.C. Kafr Qasim	63	(5)
2021–2024	Hapoel Umm al-Fahm	73	(3)
2024	→ Al-Rayyan (loan)	3	(0)
2024–2026	Al-Rayyan	17	(0)
2026–	Al-Arabi	0	(0)

International career^{‡}
2023–	Palestine	22	(1)
- * Club domestic league appearances and goals as of 25 March 2025 ‡ National team caps and goals as of 14 November 2026

Ameed Mahajna (Arabic: عميد محاجنة; born 11 October 1996) is a footballer who plays as a centre back for Qatar Stars League club Al-Arabi. Born in Israel, he plays for the Palestine national team.

== International career ==
On 11 September 2023 made his debut in the Palestine national football team in the 0–2 loss to Vietnam.

He scored his first international goal on 25 March 2025, a 97th-minute winner in Palestine's 2–1 victory over Iraq during the 2026 FIFA World Cup qualification campaign.

== Statistics ==
=== International ===
As of 25 March 2025

Appearances and goals by national team and year
National team	Year	Apps	Goals
Palestine	2024	11	0
Palestine	2025	1	1
Total		12	1

Scores and results list Palestine's goal tally first, score column indicates score after each Mahajna goal.

List of international goals scored by Ameed Mahajna
No.	Date	Venue	Opponent	Score	Result	Competition
1.	25 March 2025	Amman International Stadium, Amman, Jordan	Iraq	2–1	2–1	2026 FIFA World Cup qualification
