= Mohammad Al Hallaq =

Syrian footballer (born 1999)

Personal information
- Date of birth: 26 November 1999 (age 26)
- Place of birth: Damascus, Syria
- Height: 1.61 m (5 ft 3 in)
- Position: Midfielder

Team information
- Current team: Dibba Al-Hisn

Senior career*
Years	Team	Apps	(Gls)
2018–2021	Al-Wahda		
2021–2023	Manama		
2023–2024	Al Ahed	15	(4)
2024–2025	Al-Riffa		
2025–2026	Al-Faisaly	12	(2)
2026–	Dibba Al-Hisn		

International career^{‡}
2021–	Syria	34	(6)
- * Club domestic league appearances and goals as of 2 February 2026 ‡ National team caps and goals as of 17 November 2026

Mohammad Al Hallaq (born 26 November 1999) is a Syrian professional footballer who plays for Dibba Al-Hisn and the Syria national team.

== Club career ==
In 2021, Al Hallaq joined Bahraini Premier League Manama from Al-Wahda. In July 2024, he moved to Al Ahed FC of the Lebanese Premier League for the 2023–24 season. The following season, Al Hallaq returned to Bahrain, joining Al-Riffa SC in September 2024. He moved to Jordanian Pro League club Al-Faisaly SC at the conclusion of his contract with Al-Riffa in summer 2025.

== International career ==
Al Hallaq made his senior international debut on 25 March 2021 in a friendly against Bahrain. He scored his first international goal on 25 March 2023 in a 3–1 friendly victory over Thailand. Al Hallaq scored the game-winning goal and set up another by Mahmoud Al-Mawas against South Sudan in qualification for the 2025 FIFA Arab Cup. He was named man of the match in the victory, clinching Syria's qualification to the final tournament.

=== International goals ===
Scores and results list Syria's goal tally first.

No.	Date	Venue	Opponent	Score	Result	Competition
1.	25 March 2023	Maktoum bin Rashid Al Maktoum Stadium, Dubai, United Arab Emirates	Thailand	3–1	3–1	Friendly
2.	9 October 2025	Prince Abdullah bin Jalawi Stadium, Hofuf, Saudi Arabia	Myanmar	5–0	5–1	2027 AFC Asian Cup qualification
3.	18 November 2025	Jinnah Sports Stadium, Islamabad, Pakistan	Pakistan	1–0	5–0	2027 AFC Asian Cup qualification
4.	18 November 2025	Jinnah Sports Stadium, Islamabad, Pakistan	Pakistan	2–0	5–0	2027 AFC Asian Cup qualification
5.	25 November 2025	Grand Hamad Stadium, Doha, Qatar	South Sudan	1–0	2–0	2025 FIFA Arab Cup qualification
6.	31 March 2026	Prince Abdullah Al-Faisal Sports City Stadium, Jeddah, Saudi Arabia	Afghanistan	2–1	5–1	2027 AFC Asian Cup qualification
Last updated 31 March 2026

=== International career statistics ===
As of match played 25 November 2025

Syria
Year	Apps	Goals
2021	8	0
2022	3	0
2023	5	1
2024	6	0
2025	5	4
Total	27	5
