= United Arab Emirates national football team results (2020–present) =

This article provides details of international football games played by the United Arab Emirates national football team from 2020 to present.

== Results ==
Key
| Win |
| Draw |
| Defeat |

=== 2020 ===
| 12 October 2020 Friendly | United Arab Emirates | 1–2 | Uzbekistan | Dubai, United Arab Emirates |
| 19:00 UTC+4 | Tagliabúe 90+2' (pen.) | Report | Sergeev 48', 86' | Stadium: Rashid Stadium; Attendance: 0 Referee: Ali Abdulnabi (Bahrain) |

| 12 November 2020 Friendly | United Arab Emirates | 3–2 | Tajikistan | Dubai, United Arab Emirates |
| 18:00 UTC+4 | Mabkhout 29', 63' (pen.); Saleh 90+4' | Report | Ergashev 10'; Tursunov 20' | Stadium: Zabeel Stadium; Attendance: 0 Referee: Ammar Ashkanani (Kuwait) |

| 16 November 2020 Friendly | United Arab Emirates | 1–3 | Bahrain | Dubai, United Arab Emirates |
| 18:00 UTC+4 | Canedo Corrêa 33' | Report | Marhoon 75' (pen.); Al-Rumaihi 82', 86' | Stadium: Al Maktoum Stadium; Attendance: 0 Referee: Ahmad Al Ali (Kuwait) |

=== 2021 ===
| 12 January 2021 Friendly | United Arab Emirates | 0–0 | Iraq | Dubai, United Arab Emirates |
| 19:30 UTC+4 | | Report | | Stadium: Zabeel Stadium; Attendance: 0 Referee: Ahmed Al-Kaf (Oman) |

| 29 March 2021 Friendly | United Arab Emirates | 6–0 | India | Dubai, United Arab Emirates |
| 19:00 UTC+4 | Mabkhout 12', 32' (pen.), 60'; Ibrahim 64'; Lima 71'; Tagliabúe 84' | Report | | Stadium: Zabeel Stadium; Attendance: 0 Referee: Elges Tantachev (Uzbekistan) |

| 24 May 2021 Friendly | Jordan | 1–5 | United Arab Emirates | Dubai, United Arab Emirates |
| 20:45 UTC+4 | Al-Saify 81' | Report | Mabkhout 10', 24', 65'; Ibrahim 30'; Caio 75' | Stadium: Rashid Stadium; Attendance: 0 Referee: Ali Al-Samahiji (Bahrain) |

| 3 June 2021 2022 World Cup qualification | United Arab Emirates | 4–0 | Malaysia | Dubai, United Arab Emirates |
| 20:45 UTC+4 | Mabkhout 18', 90+1'; Lima 83', 90+2' | Report | | Stadium: Zabeel Stadium; Attendance: 1,127; Referee: Kim Dae-yong (South Korea) |

| 7 June 2021 2022 World Cup qualification | United Arab Emirates | 3–1 | Thailand | Dubai, United Arab Emirates |
| 20:45 UTC+4 | Caio 14'; Lima 33'; Jumaa 90+4' | Report (FIFA); Report (AFC) | Suphanat 54' | Stadium: Zabeel Stadium; Attendance: 980; Referee: Ryuji Sato (Japan) |

| 11 June 2021 2022 World Cup qualification | Indonesia | 0–5 | United Arab Emirates | Dubai, United Arab Emirates |
| 20:45 UTC+4 | | Report | Mabkhout 22', 49' (pen.); Lima 28', 55'; Tagliabúe 86' | Stadium: Zabeel Stadium; Attendance: 963; Referee: Mohammed Al-Hoish (Saudi Arabia) |

| 15 June 2021 2022 World Cup qualification | United Arab Emirates | 3–2 | Vietnam | Dubai, United Arab Emirates |
| 20:45 UTC+4 | Salmeen 32'; Mabkhout 40' (pen.); Khamees 50' | Report | Nguyễn Tiến Linh 85'; Trần Minh Vương 90+3' | Stadium: Zabeel Stadium; Attendance: 1,355; Referee: Ali Sabah (Iraq) |

| 2 September 2021 2022 World Cup qualification | United Arab Emirates | 0–0 | Lebanon | Dubai, United Arab Emirates |
| 20:45 UTC+4 | | Report | | Stadium: Zabeel Stadium; Referee: Ma Ning (China PR) |

| 7 September 2021 2022 World Cup qualification | Syria | 1–1 | United Arab Emirates | Amman, Jordan |
| 19:00 UTC+3 | Al Baher 64' | Report | Mabkhout 12' | Stadium: King Abdullah II Stadium; Referee: Ahmed Al-Kaf (Oman) |

| 7 October 2021 2022 World Cup qualification | United Arab Emirates | 0–1 | Iran | Dubai, United Arab Emirates |
| 20:45 UTC+4 | | Report | Taremi 70' | Stadium: Zabeel Stadium; Referee: Chris Beath (Australia) |

| 12 October 2021 2022 World Cup qualification | United Arab Emirates | 2–2 | Iraq | Dubai, United Arab Emirates |
| 20:45 UTC+4 | Caio 33'; Mabkhout 90+4' | Report | Al-Attas 74' (o.g.); Hussein 89' | Stadium: Zabeel Stadium; Attendance: 2,820; Referee: Ryuji Sato (Japan) |

| 11 November 2021 2022 World Cup qualification | South Korea | 1–0 | United Arab Emirates | Goyang, South Korea |
| 20:00 UTC+9 | Hee-chan 35' (pen.) | Report | | Stadium: Goyang Stadium; Attendance: 30,152; Referee: Ma Ning (China PR) |

| 16 November 2021 2022 World Cup qualification | Lebanon | 0–1 | United Arab Emirates | Sidon, Lebanon |
| 14:00 UTC+2 | | Report | Mabkhout 85' (pen.) | Stadium: Saida Municipal Stadium; Attendance: 0 Referee: Shaun Evans (Australia) |

| 30 November 2021 2021 FIFA Arab Cup | United Arab Emirates | 2–1 | Syria | Doha, Qatar |
| 22:00 UTC+3 | Caio 24'; Saleh 30' | Report | Al Salama 60' | Stadium: Stadium 974; Attendance: 4,129; Referee: Janny Sikazwe (Zambia) |

| 3 December 2021 2021 FIFA Arab Cup | Mauritania | 0–1 | United Arab Emirates | Doha, Qatar |
| 19:00 UTC+3 | | Report | Ibrahim 90+3' | Stadium: Stadium 974; Attendance: 3,316; Referee: Andrés Matonte (Uruguay) |

| 6 December 2021 2021 FIFA Arab Cup | Tunisia | 1–0 | United Arab Emirates | Doha, Qatar |
| 18:00 UTC+3 | Jaziri 10' | Report | | Stadium: Al Thumama Stadium; Attendance: 14,272; Referee: Daniel Siebert (Germany) |

| 10 December 2021 2021 FIFA Arab Cup | Qatar | 5–0 | United Arab Emirates | Al Khor, Qatar |
| 22:00 UTC+3 | Salmeen 6' (o.g.); Ali 28' (pen.), 45+3'; Khoukhi 36' (pen.); Hatem 44' | Report | | Stadium: Al Bayt Stadium; Attendance: 63,439; Referee: Andrés Matonte (Uruguay) |

=== 2022 ===
| 27 January 2022 2022 World Cup qualification | United Arab Emirates | 2–0 | Syria | Dubai, United Arab Emirates |
| 19:00 UTC+4 | Caio 10'; Al Ghassani 70' | Report | | Stadium: Al Maktoum Stadium; Attendance: 2,450; Referee: Ilgiz Tantashev (Uzbekistan) |

| 1 February 2022 2022 World Cup qualification | Iran | 1–0 | United Arab Emirates | Tehran, Iran |
| 18:00 UTC+3:30 | Taremi 44' | Report | | Stadium: Azadi Stadium; Attendance: 999; Referee: Ahmed Al-Kaf (Oman) |

| 24 March 2022 2022 World Cup qualification | Iraq | 1–0 | United Arab Emirates | Riyadh, Saudi Arabia |
| 20:00 UTC+3 | Al-Saedi 53' | Report | | Stadium: King Fahd Stadium; Attendance: 1,320; Referee: Ma Ning (China PR) |

| 29 March 2022 2022 World Cup qualification | United Arab Emirates | 1–0 | South Korea | Dubai, United Arab Emirates |
| 17:45 UTC+4 | Al-Maazmi 54' | Report | | Stadium: Al Maktoum Stadium; Attendance: 4,223; Referee: Ahmed Al-Kaf (Oman) |

| 29 May 2022 Friendly | United Arab Emirates | 1–1 | Gambia | Dubai, United Arab Emirates |
| | Mabkhout 39' (pen.) | Report | Mu. Barrow 48' | Stadium: Zabeel Stadium; Referee: Omar Al-Yaqoubi (Oman) |

| 7 June 2022 2022 World Cup qualification | United Arab Emirates | 1–2 | Australia | Al Rayyan, Qatar |
| 21:00 UTC+3 | Caio 57' | Report | Irvine 53'; Hrustic 84' | Stadium: Ahmad bin Ali Stadium; Attendance: 6,500; Referee: Ilgiz Tantashev (Uzbekistan) |

| 23 September 2022 Friendly | Paraguay | 1–0 | United Arab Emirates | Wiener Neustadt, Austria |
| 19:00 UTC+2 | Balbuena 85' | Report | | Stadium: Stadion Wiener Neustadt; Referee: Harald Lechner (Austria) |

| 27 September 2022 Friendly | United Arab Emirates | 0–4 | Venezuela | Wiener Neustadt, Austria |
| 17:00 UTC+2 | | Report | Savarino 18'; Rondón 25'; Chancellor 34'; Martínez 77' | Stadium: Stadion Wiener Neustadt; Referee: Manuel Schüttengruber (Austria) |

| 16 November 2022 Friendly | United Arab Emirates | 0–5 | Argentina | Abu Dhabi, United Arab Emirates |
| 19:30 UTC+4 | | Report | Álvarez 17'; Di María 25', 36'; Messi 44'; Correa 60' | Stadium: Mohammed bin Zayed Stadium; Referee: Ibrahim Nour El Din (Egypt) |

| 19 November 2022 Friendly | United Arab Emirates | 2–1 | Kazakhstan | Abu Dhabi, United Arab Emirates |
| 19:30 UTC+4 | Lima 14', 71' | Report | Aymbetov 62' | Stadium: Al Nahyan Stadium; Referee: Mahmoud El Banna (Egypt) |

| 30 December 2022 Friendly | United Arab Emirates | 1–0 | Lebanon | Dubai, United Arab Emirates |
| 19:30 UTC+4 | Tagliabúe 79' | Report | | Stadium: Al Maktoum Stadium; Referee: Qasim Al-Hatmi (Oman) |

=== 2023 ===
| 7 January 2023 25th Arabian Gulf Cup | Bahrain | 2–1 | United Arab Emirates | Basra, Iraq |
| 16:15 UTC+3 | Al-Aswad 60'; Al-Shaikh 77' | Report | Tagliabúe 90+2' | Stadium: Al-Minaa Olympic Stadium; Referee: Ahmed Al-Kaf (Oman) |

| 10 January 2023 25th Arabian Gulf Cup | United Arab Emirates | 0–1 | Kuwait | Basra, Iraq |
| 16:15 UTC+3 | | Report | Al-Dhefiri 90+3' | Stadium: Al-Minaa Olympic Stadium; Referee: Shukri Al Hanfosh (Saudi Arabia) |

| 13 January 2023 25th Arabian Gulf Cup | Qatar | 1–1 | United Arab Emirates | Basra, Iraq |
| 18:00 UTC+3 | Al-Abdullah 88' | Report | Lima 77' | Stadium: Al-Minaa Olympic Stadium; Referee: Ali Sabah (Iraq) |

| 25 March 2023 Friendly | United Arab Emirates | 0–0 | Tajikistan | Abu Dhabi, United Arab Emirates |
| 22:00 UTC+4 | | Report | | Stadium: Al Nahyan Stadium; Referee: Ammar Ashkanani (Kuwait) |

| 28 March 2023 Friendly | United Arab Emirates | 2–0 | Thailand | Abu Dhabi, United Arab Emirates |
| 22:00 UTC+4 | Abdalla 55'; Mohammed 79' | Report | | Stadium: Al Nahyan Stadium; Referee: Abbas Gholoum (Kuwait) |

| 12 September 2023 Friendly | Costa Rica | 1–4 | United Arab Emirates | Zagreb, Croatia |
| 17:00 UTC+2 | Cascante 64' | Report | Al Ghassani 16', 53'; Canedo 23'; Salmeen 38' | Stadium: Maksimir Stadium; Referee: Ante Čulina (Croatia) |

| 12 October 2023 Friendly | United Arab Emirates | 1–0 | Kuwait | Dubai, United Arab Emirates |
| 21:00 UTC+4 | Al-Zaabi 27' | Report | | Stadium: Al Maktoum Stadium; Referee: Ibrahim Nour (Egypt) |

| 17 October 2023 Friendly | United Arab Emirates | 2–1 | Lebanon | Dubai, United Arab Emirates |
| 20:00 UTC+4 | Canedo 26'; Adil 90+2' | Report | Darwich 34' | Stadium: Al Maktoum Stadium; Referee: Mohamed Hussien (Egypt) |

| 16 November 2023 2026 FIFA World Cup qualification | United Arab Emirates | 4–0 | Nepal | Dubai, United Arab Emirates |
| 19:45 UTC+4 | Al Hammadi 11'; Mabkhout 36' (pen.), 44'; Lima 45+1' | Report | | Stadium: Al Maktoum Stadium; Attendance: 3,640; Referee: Hettikamkanamge Perera (Sri Lanka) |

| 21 November 2023 2026 FIFA World Cup qualification | Bahrain | 0–2 | United Arab Emirates | Riffa, Bahrain |
| 21:15 UTC+3 | | Report | Ramadan 36'; Mabkhout 90' (pen.) | Stadium: Bahrain National Stadium; Attendance: 18,267; Referee: Mohammed Al Hoish (Saudi Arabia) |

| 30 December 2023 Friendly | United Arab Emirates | 1–0 | Kyrgyzstan | Abu Dhabi, United Arab Emirates |
| 19:15 UTC+4 | Mabkhout 90+1' (pen.) | Report | | Stadium: Mohammed bin Zayed Stadium; Referee: Sami Ahmed (Saudi Arabia) |

=== 2024 ===
| 14 January 2024 Asian Cup | United Arab Emirates | 3–1 | Hong Kong | Al Rayyan, Qatar |
| 17:30 UTC+3 | Adil 34' (pen.); Sultan 53'; Al-Ghassani 90+5' (pen.) | Report | Kwan 49' | Stadium: Khalifa International Stadium; Attendance: 15,586; Referee: Muhammad Taqi (Singapore) |

| 18 January 2024 Asian Cup | Palestine | 1–1 | United Arab Emirates | Al Wakrah, Qatar |
| 20:30 UTC+3 | Nasser 50' (o.g.) | Report | Adil 23' | Stadium: Al Janoub Stadium; Attendance: 41,986; Referee: Ahmad Al-Ali (Kuwait) |

| 23 January 2024 Asian Cup | Iran | 2–1 | United Arab Emirates | Al Rayyan, Qatar |
| 18:00 UTC+3 | Taremi 25', 65' | | Al-Ghassani 90+3' | Stadium: Education City Stadium; Attendance: 34,259; Referee: Ilgiz Tantashev (Uzbekistan) |

| 28 January 2024 Asian Cup | Tajikistan | 1–1 (5–3 p) | United Arab Emirates | Al Rayyan, Qatar |
| 19:00 UTC+3 | Khanonov 30' | Report | Al Hammadi 90+5' | Stadium: Ahmad bin Ali Stadium; Referee: Yusuke Araki (Japan) |
| | Penalties |
| | Nazarov (penalty scored); Khanonov (penalty scored); Panjshanbe (penalty scored); Soirov (penalty scored); Shukurov (penalty scored) | | (penalty scored) Idrees; (penalty missed) Caio; (penalty scored) Lima; (penalty scored) Saleh |

| 21 March 2024 2026 FIFA World Cup qualification | United Arab Emirates | 2–1 | Yemen | Abu Dhabi, United Arab Emirates |
| 22:00 UTC+4 | Saleh 24' (pen.); Adil 72' | Report | Idrees 69' (o.g.) | Stadium: Al Nahyan Stadium; Attendance: 2,948; Referee: Mohanad Qasim Sarray (Iraq) |

| 26 March 2024 2026 FIFA World Cup qualification | Yemen | 0–3 | United Arab Emirates | Khobar, Saudi Arabia |
| 22:00 UTC+3 | | Report | Lima 14', 22'; Adil 35' | Stadium: Prince Saud bin Jalawi Sports City; Attendance: 1,135; Referee: Ilgiz Tantashev (Uzbekistan) |

| 6 June 2024 2026 FIFA World Cup qualification | Nepal | 0–4 | United Arab Emirates | Dammam, Saudi Arabia |
| 19:00 UTC+3 | | Report | Abdalla 12', 14'; Saleh 53'; Mohammed 75' | Stadium: Prince Mohamed bin Fahd Stadium; Attendance: 2,450; Referee: Payam Heydari (Iran) |

| 11 June 2024 2026 FIFA World Cup qualification | United Arab Emirates | 1–1 | Bahrain | Dubai, United Arab Emirates |
| 21:00 UTC+4 | Adil 10' | Report | Abduljabbar 4' | Stadium: Zabeel Stadium; Attendance: 953; Referee: Ma Ning (China) |

| 5 September 2024 2026 FIFA World Cup qualification | Qatar | 1–3 | United Arab Emirates | Al Rayyan, Qatar |
| 19:00 UTC+3 | Al-Hassan 38' | Report | Abdalla 68'; Ibrahim 80'; Ali Saleh 90+4' | Stadium: Ahmad bin Ali Stadium; Attendance: 33,952; Referee: Shaun Evans (Australia) |

| 10 September 2024 2026 FIFA World Cup qualification | United Arab Emirates | 0–1 | Iran | Al Ain, United Arab Emirates |
| 20:00 UTC+4 | | | Ghayedi 45+3' | Stadium: Hazza bin Zayed Stadium; Attendance: 17,826; Referee: Kim Jong-hyeok (South Korea) |

| 10 October 2024 2026 FIFA World Cup qualification | United Arab Emirates | 1–1 | North Korea | Al Ain, United Arab Emirates |
| 20:00 UTC+4 | Al-Ghassani 66' | Report | Jong Il-gwan 86' | Stadium: Hazza bin Zayed Stadium; Attendance: 8,536; Referee: Adham Makhadmeh (Jordan) |

| 15 October 2024 2026 FIFA World Cup qualification | Uzbekistan | 1–0 | United Arab Emirates | Tashkent, Uzbekistan |
| 19:00 UTC+5 | Shukurov 76' (pen.) | Report | | Stadium: Milliy Stadium; Referee: Ma Ning (China) |

| 14 November 2024 2026 FIFA World Cup qualification | United Arab Emirates | 3–0 | Kyrgyzstan | Abu Dhabi, United Arab Emirates |
| 20:15 UTC+4 | Abdalla 15', 89'; Meloni 35' | Report | | Stadium: Mohammed bin Zayed Stadium; Attendance: 6,238; Referee: Ahmed Al-Kaf (Oman) |

| 19 November 2024 2026 FIFA World Cup qualification | United Arab Emirates | 5–0 | Qatar | Abu Dhabi, United Arab Emirates |
| 20:00 UTC+4 | Fábio Lima 4', 45' (pen.), 45+5', 56' (pen.); Al-Ghassani 73' | Report | | Stadium: Al Nahyan Stadium; Attendance: 13,825; Referee: Khalid Saleh Al-Turais (Saudi Arabia) |

| 21 December 2024 26th Arabian Gulf Cup | Qatar | 1–1 | United Arab Emirates | Kuwait City, Kuwait |
| --:-- UTC+3 | Afif 17' (pen.) | | Al-Ghassani 45+1' | Stadium: Sulaibikhat Stadium; Attendance: 5,007; Referee: István Kovács (Romania) |

| 24 December 2024 26th Arabian Gulf Cup | United Arab Emirates | 1–2 | Kuwait | Kuwait City, Kuwait |
| 20:30 UTC+3 | Caio 5' | | Daham 16'; M. Al-Enezi 89' | Stadium: Jaber Al-Ahmad International Stadium; Attendance: 48,621; Referee: Dahane Beida (Mauritania) |

| 27 December 2024 26th Arabian Gulf Cup | United Arab Emirates | 1–1 | Oman | Kuwait City, Kuwait |
| 17:30 UTC+3 | Al-Ghassani 20' | | Al-Mushaifri 79' | Stadium: Sulaibikhat Stadium; Referee: Ammar Mahfoodh (Bahrain) |

=== 2025 ===
| 20 March 2025 2026 FIFA World Cup qualification | Iran | 2–0 | United Arab Emirates | Tehran, Iran |
| 19:30 UTC+3:30 | Azmoun 45+27'; Mohebi 70' | Report | | Stadium: Azadi Stadium; Attendance: 20,469; Referee: Ko Hyung-jin (South Korea) |

| 25 March 2025 2026 FIFA World Cup qualification | North Korea | 1–2 | United Arab Emirates | Riyadh, Saudi Arabia (Note: North Korea chose Riyadh as their home site for their match against the United Arab Emirates due to "security concerns".) |
| 21:15 UTC+3 | Yu-song 43' | Report | Lima 5'; Adil 90+8' | Stadium: Prince Faisal bin Fahd Sports City Stadium; Attendance: 223; Referee: Mohammed Al Hoish (Saudi Arabia) |

| 5 June 2025 2026 FIFA World Cup qualification | United Arab Emirates | 0–0 | Uzbekistan | Abu Dhabi, United Arab Emirates |
| 20:00 UTC+4 | | Report | | Stadium: Al Nahyan Stadium; Attendance: 9,820; Referee: Shaun Evans (Australia) |

| 10 June 2025 2026 FIFA World Cup qualification | Kyrgyzstan | 1–1 | United Arab Emirates | Bishkek, Kyrgyzstan |
| 19:45 UTC+6 | Merk 90+5' | Report | Abdalla 30' | Stadium: Dolen Omurzakov Stadium; Attendance: 12,258; Referee: Ahmed Al-Ali (Kuwait) |

| 4 September 2025 Friendly | United Arab Emirates | 3–1 | Syria | Dubai, United Arab Emirates |
| 20:00 UTC+4 | Ivković 62'; Al-Ghassani 78' (pen.); Gastón Suárez 86' | Report | Al Salkhadi 36' | Stadium: Zabeel Stadium |

| 8 September 2025 Friendly | United Arab Emirates | 1–0 | Bahrain | Dubai, United Arab Emirates |
| 21:15 UTC+4 | Luanzinho 24' | Report | | Stadium: Zabeel Stadium |

| 11 October 2025 2026 FIFA World Cup qualification | United Arab Emirates | 2–1 | Oman | Al Rayyan, Qatar |
| 19:00 UTC+3 | Meloni 76'; Caio 83' | Report | Autonne 12' (o.g.) | Stadium: Jassim bin Hamad Stadium; Attendance: 8,817; Referee: Alireza Faghani (Australia) |

| 14 October 2025 2026 FIFA World Cup qualification | Qatar | 2–1 | United Arab Emirates | Al Rayyan, Qatar |
| 19:00 UTC+3 | Khoukhi 49'; Pedro Miguel 74' | Report | Adil 90+8' | Stadium: Jassim bin Hamad Stadium; Attendance: 13,038; Referee: Ilgiz Tantashev (Uzbekistan) |

| 13 November 2025 2026 FIFA World Cup qualification | United Arab Emirates | 1–1 | Iraq | Abu Dhabi, United Arab Emirates |
| 20:00 UTC+4 | Luanzinho 18' 18' | Report | Al-Hamadi 10' | Stadium: Mohammed bin Zayed Stadium; Attendance: 32,008; Referee: Shaun Evans (Australia) |

| 18 November 2025 2026 FIFA World Cup qualification | Iraq | 2–1 | United Arab Emirates | Basra, Iraq |
| 19:30 UTC+3 | Ali 66'; Al-Ammari 90+17' (pen.) | Report | Caio Lucas 52' | Stadium: Basra International Stadium; Attendance: 62,444; Referee: Yusuke Araki (Japan) |

| 3 December 2025 2025 FIFA Arab Cup | Jordan | 2–1 | United Arab Emirates | Al Khor, Qatar |
| 20:00 UTC+3 | Olwan 20' (pen.); Al-Naimat 63' | Report | Bruno 47' | Stadium: Al Bayt Stadium; Attendance: 30,759; Referee: Ahmed Al-Kaf (Oman) |

| 6 December 2025 2025 FIFA Arab Cup | United Arab Emirates | 1–1 | Egypt | Lusail, Qatar |
| 21:30 UTC+3 | Lucas 60' | Report | Hamdy 85' | Stadium: Lusail Stadium; Attendance: 36,999; Referee: Glenn Nyberg (Sweden) |

| 9 December 2025 2025 FIFA Arab Cup | United Arab Emirates | 3–1 | Kuwait | Doha, Qatar |
| 17:30 UTC+3 | Al-Ghassani 16' (pen.), 18'; Giménez 66' | Report | Al Hajeri 59' | Stadium: Stadium 974; Attendance: 15,357; Referee: Ma Ning (China) |

| 12 December 2025 2025 FIFA Arab Cup | Algeria | 1–1 (6–7 p) | United Arab Emirates | Al Khor, Qatar |
| 20:30 UTC+3 | Boulbina 46' | Report | Bruno 64' | Stadium: Al Bayt Stadium; Attendance: 50,424; Referee: Adham Makhadmeh (Jordan) |
| | Penalties |
| | Brahimi (penalty scored); Benzia (penalty missed); Mrezigue (penalty scored); Ounas (penalty scored); Boulbina (penalty scored); Halaïmia (penalty scored); Draoui (penalty scored); Khacef (penalty missed) | | (penalty scored) Lucas; (penalty missed) Meloni; (penalty scored) Saleh; (penalty scored) Pimenta; (penalty scored) Faiz; (penalty scored) Adil; (penalty scored) Autonne; (penalty scored) Akonnor |

| 15 December 2025 2025 FIFA Arab Cup | Morocco | 3–0 | United Arab Emirates | Al Rayyan, Qatar |
| 17:30 UTC+3 | El Berkaoui 28'; El Mahdioui 83'; Hamadallah 90+2' | Report | | Stadium: Khalifa International Stadium; Attendance: 33,898; Referee: Espen Eskås (Norway) |

| 18 December 2025 2025 FIFA Arab Cup | Saudi Arabia | Abandoned | United Arab Emirates | Al Rayyan, Qatar |
| 14:00 UTC+3 | | Report | | Stadium: Khalifa International Stadium; Referee: Cristián Garay (Chile) |
Note: Match was abandoned at halftime due to heavy rainfall.

=== 2026 ===
| 24 September 2026 27th Arabian Gulf Cup | United Arab Emirates | 4–0 | Yemen | Jeddah, Saudi Arabia |
| 18:55 UTC+3 | Giménez 26', 51'; Sahal 36' (o.g.); Luanzinho 45+4' | Report | | Stadium: King Abdullah Sports City Stadium; Attendance: 10,138; Referee: Qasim Al-Hatmi (Oman) |

| 27 September 2026 27th Arabian Gulf Cup | Bahrain | 0–3 | United Arab Emirates | Jeddah, Saudi Arabia |
| 21:00 UTC+3 | | Report | Camara 30'; Bala 66'; Saleh 88' | Stadium: Prince Abdullah Al-Faisal Sports City Stadium; Attendance: 1,747; Referee: Abdullah Jamali (Kuwait) |

| 30 September 2026 27th Arabian Gulf Cup | United Arab Emirates | 1–1 | Qatar | Jeddah, Saudi Arabia |
| 20:30 UTC+3 | Saleh 45+4' | Report | Ali 33' | Stadium: King Abdullah Sports City Stadium; Referee: Jalal Jayed (Morocco) |

| 3 October 2026 27th Arabian Gulf Cup | United Arab Emirates | 1–0 | Oman | Jeddah, Saudi Arabia |
| 21:30 UTC+3 | Camara 22' | Report | | Stadium: Prince Abdullah Al-Faisal Sports City Stadium; Attendance: 2,088; Referee: Danny Makkelie (Netherlands) |

| 6 October 2026 27th Arabian Gulf Cup | Saudi Arabia | 2–0 | United Arab Emirates | Jeddah, Saudi Arabia |
| 21:00 UTC+3 | Al-Hammami 11'; Al-Buraikan 13' | Report | | Stadium: Prince Abdullah Al-Faisal Sports City Stadium; Attendance: 62,827; Referee: Jalal Jayed (Morocco) |

| 13 November 2026 Friendly | United Arab Emirates | 3–1 | Honduras | Abu Dhabi, United Arab Emirates |
| 18:10 UTC+4 | Al Hammadi 33'; Bruno 48'; Juma 87' | Report | Toro 52' | Stadium: Mohammed bin Zayed Stadium; Referee: Ahmad Al-Ali (Kuwait) |

| 17 November 2026 Friendly | United Arab Emirates | 4–2 | Syria | Al Ain, United Arab Emirates |
| 18:10 UTC+4 | Ivković 36'; Abdalla 49'; Giménez 67'; Camara 69' | Report | Moustfa 44'; Al Mustafa 90+2' | Stadium: Hazza bin Zayed Stadium; Referee: Ammar Ebrahim (Bahrain) |

== Statistics ==
=== Venues ===
| | Venue | City | Matches |
|---|---|---|---|
| 1 | Zabeel Stadium | (Emirate of Dubai) Dubai | 14 |
| 2 | Al Maktoum Stadium | (Emirate of Dubai) Dubai | 7 |
| 2 | Mohammed bin Zayed Stadium | (Emirate of Abu Dhabi) Abu Dhabi | 7 |
| 4 | Al Nahyan Stadium | (Emirate of Abu Dhabi) Abu Dhabi | 5 |
| 5 | Rashid Stadium | (Emirate of Dubai) Dubai | 2 |
| 5 | Hazza bin Zayed Stadium | (Emirate of Abu Dhabi) Al Ain | 2 |

=== Managers ===
| Name | First match | Last match | Pld | W | D | L | GF | GA | GD |
|---|---|---|---|---|---|---|---|---|---|
| (Colombia) Jorge Luis Pinto | 12 October 2020 | 16 November 2020 | 3 | 1 | 0 | 2 | 5 | 7 | –2 |
| (Netherlands) Bert van Marwijk | 12 January 2021 | 1 February 2022 | 19 | 10 | 4 | 5 | 35 | 17 | +18 |
| (Argentina) Rodolfo Arruabarrena | 24 March 2022 | 28 March 2023 | 14 | 4 | 3 | 7 | 10 | 19 | −9 |
| (Portugal) Paulo Bento | 12 September 2023 | 25 March 2025 | 23 | 14 | 6 | 3 | 46 | 16 | +30 |
| (Portugal) Sérgio Costa (Note: Paulo Bento was suspended for the match due to his sending off in United Arab Emirates's match against Palestine. Assistant manager Sérgio Costa filled in as manager.) | 23 January 2023 | | 1 | 0 | 0 | 1 | 1 | 2 | –1 |
| (Romania) Cosmin Olăroiu | 5 June 2025 | 18 December 2025 | 13 | 4 | 5 | 4 | 16 | 16 | 0 |
| (Croatia) Zlatko Dalić | 24 September 2026 | Present | 7 | 5 | 1 | 1 | 16 | 6 | +10 |
| Total | | | 80 | 38 | 19 | 23 | 129 | 83 | +46 |

=== Head to head records ===
Head to head records
| Opponent | P | W | D | L | GF | GA | W% | D% | L% |
|---|---|---|---|---|---|---|---|---|---|
| Algeria | 1 | 0 | 1 | 0 | 1 | 1 | 0 | 100 | 0 |
| Argentina | 1 | 0 | 0 | 1 | 0 | 5 | 0 | 0 | 100 |
| Australia | 1 | 0 | 0 | 1 | 1 | 2 | 0 | 0 | 100 |
| Bahrain | 6 | 3 | 1 | 2 | 9 | 6 | 50 | 16.67 | 33.33 |
| Costa Rica | 1 | 1 | 0 | 0 | 4 | 1 | 100 | 0 | 0 |
| Egypt | 1 | 0 | 1 | 0 | 1 | 1 | 0 | 100 | 0 |
| Gambia | 1 | 0 | 1 | 0 | 1 | 1 | 0 | 100 | 0 |
| Honduras | 1 | 1 | 0 | 0 | 3 | 1 | 100 | 0 | 0 |
| Hong Kong | 1 | 1 | 0 | 0 | 3 | 1 | 100 | 0 | 0 |
| India | 1 | 1 | 0 | 0 | 6 | 0 | 100 | 0 | 0 |
| Indonesia | 1 | 1 | 0 | 0 | 5 | 0 | 100 | 0 | 0 |
| Iran | 5 | 0 | 0 | 5 | 1 | 7 | 0 | 0 | 100 |
| Iraq | 5 | 0 | 3 | 2 | 4 | 6 | 0 | 60 | 40 |
| Jordan | 2 | 1 | 0 | 1 | 6 | 3 | 50 | 0 | 50 |
| Kazakhstan | 1 | 1 | 0 | 0 | 2 | 1 | 100 | 0 | 0 |
| Kyrgyzstan | 3 | 2 | 1 | 0 | 5 | 1 | 66.67 | 33.33 | 0 |
| Kuwait | 4 | 2 | 0 | 2 | 5 | 4 | 50 | 0 | 50 |
| Lebanon | 4 | 3 | 1 | 0 | 4 | 1 | 75 | 25 | 0 |
| Malaysia | 1 | 1 | 0 | 0 | 4 | 0 | 100 | 0 | 0 |
| Mauritania | 1 | 1 | 0 | 0 | 1 | 0 | 100 | 0 | 0 |
| Morocco | 1 | 0 | 0 | 1 | 0 | 3 | 0 | 0 | 100 |
| Nepal | 2 | 2 | 0 | 0 | 8 | 0 | 100 | 0 | 0 |
| North Korea | 2 | 1 | 1 | 0 | 3 | 2 | 50 | 50 | 0 |
| Oman | 3 | 2 | 1 | 0 | 4 | 2 | 66.67 | 33.33 | 0 |
| Palestine | 1 | 0 | 1 | 0 | 1 | 1 | 0 | 100 | 0 |
| Paraguay | 1 | 0 | 0 | 1 | 0 | 1 | 0 | 0 | 100 |
| Qatar | 7 | 2 | 3 | 2 | 12 | 11 | 28.57 | 42.86 | 28.57 |
| Saudi Arabia | 1 | 0 | 0 | 1 | 0 | 2 | 0 | 0 | 100 |
| South Korea | 2 | 1 | 0 | 1 | 1 | 1 | 50 | 0 | 50 |
| Syria | 5 | 4 | 1 | 0 | 12 | 5 | 80 | 20 | 0 |
| Tajikistan | 3 | 1 | 2 | 0 | 4 | 3 | 33.33 | 66.67 | 0 |
| Tunisia | 1 | 0 | 0 | 1 | 0 | 1 | 0 | 0 | 100 |
| Thailand | 2 | 2 | 0 | 0 | 5 | 1 | 100 | 0 | 0 |
| Uzbekistan | 3 | 0 | 1 | 2 | 1 | 3 | 0 | 33.33 | 66.67 |
| Venezuela | 1 | 0 | 0 | 1 | 0 | 4 | 0 | 0 | 100 |
| Vietnam | 1 | 1 | 0 | 0 | 3 | 2 | 100 | 0 | 0 |
| Yemen | 3 | 3 | 0 | 0 | 9 | 1 | 100 | 0 | 0 |
| Totals | 80 | 38 | 19 | 23 | 129 | 83 | 47.5 | 23.75 | 28.75 |
