= 2021 UAE Super Cup =

- Event: Super Cup
Al Jazira	Shabab Al Ahli
AGL	Cup
1	1
- Al Jazira won 5–3 on penalties
- Date: 7 January 2022
- Venue: Hazza bin Zayed Stadium, Al Ain
- Referee: Sultan Abdurazzaq

The 2021 UAE Super Cup was the 14th professional and 20th overall UAE Super Cup, an annual football match played between the winners of the previous season's League and President's Cup.

It was played between Al Jazira who won the league on the final day of the season and Shabab Al Ahli who defeated Al Nasr in the President's cup final. Al Jazira would win their first super cup title after beating Shabab Al Ahli 5–3 on penalty shootouts.

== Details ==
7 January 2022
19:45

Al Jazira	1–1	Shabab Al Ahli
Ramadan 88'	Report	Jumaa 65'
Penalties
Victor (penalty scored); Diab (penalty scored); Fawzi (penalty scored); Jamal (penalty scored); Idrees (penalty scored)	5–3	(penalty scored) Nourollahi; (penalty scored) Jaber; (penalty missed) Al-Naqbi; (penalty scored) Jumaa

Hazza bin Zayed Stadium, Al Ain
Referee: Sultan Abdurazzaq

Al Jazira	Shabab Al Ahli

GK	55	(United Arab Emirates) Ali Khasif (c)
RB	24	(United Arab Emirates) Zayed Sultan	(yellow card) 9' (substituted off) 68'
CB	4	(United Arab Emirates) Mohammed Al Attas
CB	5	(United Arab Emirates) Khalifa Al Hammadi
LB	2	(United Arab Emirates) Abdulla Idrees
LM	11	(United Arab Emirates) Abdullah Ramadan
MF	17	(South Africa) Thulani Serero
LW	29	(Brazil) João Victor
CF	80	(Brazil) Bruno	(substituted off) 82'
DF	15	(Morocco) Mohammed Rabii
ST	21	(Mali) Abdoulay Diaby
Substitutes:
GK	1	(United Arab Emirates) Abdulrahman Al Ameri
FW	16	(United Arab Emirates) Ahmed Fawzi	(substituted in) 68'
MF	22	(United Arab Emirates) Mohammed Jamal	(substituted in) 82'
CM	27	(United Arab Emirates) Abdullah Fadaaq
CM	28	(United Arab Emirates) Yousef Ayman
CF	34	(United Arab Emirates) Saeed Al-Abdouli
CB	37	(United Arab Emirates) Hamdan Abdulrahman
CB	38	(United Arab Emirates) Nawaf Dhawi
GK	56	(United Arab Emirates) Rakaan Waleed
Manager:
(Netherlands) Marcel Keizer

GK	55	(United Arab Emirates) Majed Naser (c)
RB	37	(United Arab Emirates) Ahmed Abdulla	(substituted off) 46'
CB	4	(United Arab Emirates) Mohammed Marzooq
CB	5	(United Arab Emirates) Walid Abbas
LB	62	(United Arab Emirates) Abdelaziz Sanqour	(yellow card) 56'	(substituted off) 86'
MF	15	(United Arab Emirates) Abdullah Al-Naqbi
MF	7	(Iran) Ahmad Nourollahi
CM	3	(Brazil) Carlos Eduardo	(substituted off) 79'
RW	16	(Iran) Mehdi Ghayedi
ST	23	(United Arab Emirates) Yahya Al Ghassani	(substituted off) 46'
LW	34	(United Arab Emirates) Hareb Abdullah	(yellow card) 38'
Substitutes:
MF	6	(Uzbekistan) Azizjon Ganiev
RB	9	(United Arab Emirates) Abdulaziz Haikal	(substituted in) 46'
MF	10	(United Arab Emirates) Omar Abdulrahman
GK	12	(United Arab Emirates) Hassan Hamza
DF	20	(United Arab Emirates) Yousif Jaber	(substituted in) 86'
MF	26	(United Arab Emirates) Eid Khamis	(substituted in) 79'
MF	30	(United Arab Emirates) Mohammed Jumaa	(substituted in) 46'
CB	61	(United Arab Emirates) Bader Nasser
LW	77	(Brazil) Guilherme Bala
Manager:
(United Arab Emirates) Mahdi Ali
