= 2023 AFC Asian Cup Group C =

Group C of the 2023 AFC Asian Cup took place from 14 to 23 January 2024. The group consisted of Iran, United Arab Emirates, Hong Kong and Palestine. The top two teams, Iran and the United Arab Emirates, along with third-placed Palestine (as one of the four best third-placed teams), advanced to the round of 16.

== Teams ==
Draw position	Team	Zone	Method of qualification	Date of qualification	Finals appearance	Last appearance	Previous best performance	FIFA Rankings	
Draw position	Team	Zone	Method of qualification	Date of qualification	Finals appearance	Last appearance	Previous best performance	April 2023 (Note: The rankings of April 2023 were used for seeding for the final draw.)	December 2023
C1	Iran	CAFA	Second round Group C winners	15 June 2021	15th	2019	Winners (1968, 1972, 1976)	24	21
C2	United Arab Emirates	WAFF	Second round Group G winners	15 June 2021	11th	2019	Runners-up (1996)	72	64
C3	Hong Kong	EAFF	Third round Group D runners-up	14 June 2022	4th	1968	Third place (1956)	147	150
C4	Palestine	WAFF	Third round Group B winners	14 June 2022	3rd	2019	Group stage (2015, 2019)	93	99

== Standings ==
Pos	Team	Pld	W	D	L	GF	GA	GD	Pts	Qualification
1	Iran	3	3	0	0	7	2	+5	9	Advance to knockout stage
2	United Arab Emirates	3	1	1	1	5	4	+1	4	Advance to knockout stage
3	Palestine	3	1	1	1	5	5	0	4	Advance to knockout stage
4	Hong Kong	3	0	0	3	1	7	−6	0	

Source: AFC
Rules for classification: Group stage tiebreakers

== Matches ==
=== United Arab Emirates vs Hong Kong ===
This was the first time the sides met in the group stage of an Asian Cup. They had previously met three times in the past, with a draw in 2000 and two 4–0 wins for the Emiratis as part of 2015 AFC Asian Cup qualification.

In the 30th minute, Sultan Adil shot his ball to the hand of Hong Kong defender Oliver Gerbig, with the referee deciding to give a penalty after consulting VAR due to Gerbig's hand movement being deemed abnormal. Adil then converted the penalty himself to give the Emiratis the lead. Early in the second half, Everton Camargo delivered a brilliant pass from the right flank to Chan Siu Kwan, who then equalised with what was Hong Kong's first goal since Li Kwok Keung on 15 May 1968, and the 1,000th goal in Asian Cup history. However, Zayed Sultan soon reclaimed the lead for the Emiratis after two earlier shots from Abdullah Ramadan and Adil were denied by keeper Yapp Hung Fai, when Sultan was quick to seize the opportunity over the ball's deflection to his position. In the first minute of second-half stoppage time, Yahya Al-Ghassani was deemed to have been fouled by Shinichi Chan while dribbling in Hong Kong's penalty area after another VAR consultation, going on to become a controversial penalty decision, during which Al-Ghassani would again successfully convert in the sixth minute of added time. Minutes later, Michael Udebuluzor scored a second goal for Hong Kong which was ruled out by VAR again, as the United Arab Emirates triumphed 3–1.

14 January 2024
17:30

United Arab Emirates	3–1	Hong Kong
Adil 34' (pen.); Sultan 52'; Al-Ghassani 90+5' (pen.)	Report	Chan Siu Kwan 49'

Khalifa International Stadium, Al Rayyan
Attendance: 15,586
Referee: Muhammad Taqi (Singapore)

United Arab Emirates	Hong Kong

GK	17	Khalid Eisa (c)
RB	3	Zayed Sultan		(substituted off) 88'
CB	12	Khalifa Al Hammadi
CB	26	Bader Nasser
LB	2	Abdulla Idrees	(yellow card) 23'
CM	15	Yahia Nader		(substituted off) 81'
CM	18	Abdullah Ramadan		(substituted off) 88'
RW	10	Fábio Lima		(substituted off) 68'
CM	8	Tahnoon Al-Zaabi		(substituted off) 68'
LW	11	Caio Canedo
CF	23	Sultan Adil
Substitutions:
MF	14	Abdulla Hamad		(substituted on) 68'
FW	20	Yahya Al-Ghassani		(substituted on) 68'
MF	5	Ali Salmeen		(substituted on) 81'
DF	24	Ahmed Jamil		(substituted on) 88'
DF	4	Khalid Al-Hashemi		(substituted on) 88'
Manager:
(Portugal) Paulo Bento

GK	1	Yapp Hung Fai (c)
RB	21	Yue Tze Nam	(yellow card) 27'	(substituted off) 67'
CB	3	Oliver Gerbig	(yellow card) 33'
CB	13	Li Ngai Hoi		(substituted off) 90+1'
LB	17	Shinichi Chan
CM	6	Wu Chun Ming
CM	8	Tan Chun Lok		(substituted off) 90+1'
RW	11	Everton Camargo
AM	16	Chan Siu Kwan		(substituted off) 78'
LW	14	Poon Pui Hin		(substituted off) 66'
CF	9	Matt Orr
Substitutions:
FW	25	Stefan Pereira		(substituted on) 66'
FW	20	Michael Udebuluzor		(substituted on) 67'
MF	10	Wong Wai		(substituted on) 78'
DF	4	Vas Nuñez		(substituted on) 90+1'
MF	22	Yu Joy Yin		(substituted on) 90+1'
Manager:
(Norway) Jørn Andersen

Man of the Match:
Yahya Al-Ghassani (United Arab Emirates)

Assistant referees:
Ronnie Goh Min Kiat (Singapore)
Abdul Hannan Bin Abdul Hasim (Singapore)
Fourth official:
Ahmad Al-Ali (Kuwait)
Reserve assistant referee:
Abdulhadi Al-Enezi (Kuwait)
Video assistant referee:
Sivakorn Pu-udom (Thailand)
Assistant video assistant referees:
Kate Jacewicz (Australia)

=== Iran vs Palestine ===
The sides had faced each other six times prior, with Iran undefeated in all matches; their most recent meeting was a friendly in 2018, which ended with a 1–1 draw.

Iran got off to a dream start after a fast attack saw Mehdi Ghayedi seize the opportunity from a throw-in, passing to Saman Ghoddos who sent the ball to Karim Ansarifard, putting Iran in front after just two minutes. Iran doubled their lead ten minutes later after Ghoddos delivered a set-piece which Shojae Khalilzadeh quickly got on the end of to strike the ball into the net. In the 38th minute, a failed clearance from Palestine's Mohammed Rashid was intercepted by Ansarifard, who then passed to Alireza Jahanbakhsh and then Ghayedi, striking a low shot to give Iran a three-goal lead. In the sixth minute of first half stoppage time, a clever set-piece from Palestine's Zaid Qunbar caught Iranian defender Saeid Ezatolahi by surprise, as he headed the ball directly to his opponent Tamer Seyam, whose subsequent converted header was thus onside and reduced Iran's lead back to a two-goal margin. Iran then buried any Palestinian hope of a comeback in the 55th minute when Sadegh Moharrami, receiving the ball from Majid Hosseini, delivered a decisive pass for Sardar Azmoun, who then struck the net after clumsy attempts by the Palestinians to clear the ball.

14 January 2024
20:30

Iran	4–1	Palestine
Ansarifard 2'; Khalilzadeh 12'; Ghayedi 38'; Azmoun 55'	Report	Seyam 45+6'

Education City Stadium, Al Rayyan
Attendance: 27,691
Referee: Abdulrahman Al-Jassim (Qatar)

Iran	Palestine

GK	1	Alireza Beiranvand
RB	2	Sadegh Moharrami		(substituted off) 81'
CB	13	Hossein Kanaanizadegan	(yellow card) 17'
CB	4	Shojae Khalilzadeh		(substituted off) 44'
LB	3	Ehsan Hajsafi (c)
CM	6	Saeid Ezatolahi
CM	14	Saman Ghoddos		(substituted off) 90'
RW	7	Alireza Jahanbakhsh
AM	9	Mehdi Taremi
LW	18	Mehdi Ghayedi		(substituted off) 46'
CF	10	Karim Ansarifard		(substituted off) 46'
Substitutions:
DF	19	Majid Hosseini		(substituted on) 44'
FW	20	Sardar Azmoun		(substituted on) 46'
MF	21	Mohammad Mohebi		(substituted on) 46'
DF	23	Ramin Rezaeian		(substituted on) 81'
MF	8	Omid Ebrahimi		(substituted on) 90'
Manager:
Amir Ghalenoei

GK	22	Rami Hamadeh
RB	7	Musab Al-Battat (c)
CB	4	Yaser Hamed		(substituted off) 46'
CB	15	Michel Termanini	(yellow card) 10'
LB	12	Camilo Saldaña	(yellow card) 40'	(substituted off) 46'
RM	9	Tamer Seyam	(yellow card) 42'	(substituted off) 84'
CM	3	Mohammed Rashid
CM	6	Oday Kharoub
LM	10	Mahmoud Abu Warda
CF	20	Zaid Qunbar	(yellow card) 51'	(substituted off) 65'
CF	13	Shehab Qunbar		(substituted off) 65'
Substitutions:
DF	2	Mohammed Khalil	(yellow card) 80'	(substituted on) 46'
DF	5	Mohammed Saleh	(yellow card) 90+5'	(substituted on) 46'
FW	8	Hassan Alaa Aldeen		(substituted on) 65'
FW	11	Oday Dabbagh		(substituted on) 65'
MF	14	Samer Zubaida		(substituted on) 84'
Manager:
(Tunisia) Makram Daboub

Man of the Match:
Saman Ghoddos (Iran)

Assistant referees:
Taleb Al-Marri (Qatar)
Saoud Al-Maqaleh (Qatar)
Fourth official:
Hanna Hattab (Syria)
Reserve assistant referee:
Ali Ahmad (Syria)
Video assistant referee:
Abdulla Al-Marri (Qatar)
Assistant video assistant referees:
Khamis Al-Marri (Qatar)

=== Palestine vs United Arab Emirates ===
This was the sides' first meeting since 2016, when the two faced as part of 2018 FIFA World Cup qualification, with the United Arab Emirates winning 2–0 at home.

The UAE had the better start, and in the 23rd minute, from a contested ball in the midfield won by Ali Saleh, he provided a perfect cross for Sultan Adil, who then headed into the Palestinian net to give the Emiratis the lead. However, the match changed direction significantly after a pulling foul in the area from Emirati defender Khalifa Al Hammadi on Oday Dabbagh in the 34th minute, which resulted in Al Hammadi's dismissal after VAR intervention; despite this, Tamer Seyam failed to convert from the resulting penalty with goalkeeper Khalid Eisa keeping his effort out. Nonetheless, Palestine's persistent pressure paid off in the 50th minute when, from a long-range delivery, Seyam redeemed himself with a tricky cross into the penalty area, which Bader Nasser's header turned into an own goal to level the match. In spite of this goal and persistent continued Palestinian pressure, the United Arab Emirates held firm as the contest ended in a draw, denying the Palestinians a first-ever win at the Asian Cup.

18 January 2024
20:30

Palestine	1–1	United Arab Emirates
Nasser 50' (o.g.)	Report	Adil 23'

Al Janoub Stadium, Al Wakrah
Attendance: 41,986
Referee: Ahmad Al-Ali (Kuwait)

Palestine	United Arab Emirates

GK	22	Rami Hamadeh
RB	7	Musab Al-Battat (c)
CB	15	Michel Termanini
CB	5	Mohammed Saleh
LB	12	Camilo Saldaña		(substituted off) 90'
RM	9	Tamer Seyam
CM	6	Oday Kharoub		(substituted off) 90'
CM	3	Mohammed Rashid		(substituted off) 63'
LM	10	Mahmoud Abu Warda		(substituted off) 80'
CF	11	Oday Dabbagh
CF	20	Zaid Qunbar		(substituted off) 80'
Substitutions:
MF	23	Ataa Jaber	(yellow card) 90+9'	(substituted on) 63'
FW	13	Shehab Qunbar		(substituted on) 80'
MF	21	Islam Batran		(substituted on) 80'
MF	14	Samer Zubaida		(substituted on) 90'
DF	25	Samer Jundi		(substituted on) 90'
Manager:
(Tunisia) Makram Daboub

GK	17	Khalid Eisa (c)
RB	19	Khaled Ibrahim		(substituted off) 65'
CB	12	Khalifa Al Hammadi	(red card) 37'
CB	26	Bader Nasser
LB	2	Abdulla Idrees
CM	6	Majid Rashid
CM	18	Abdullah Ramadan		(substituted off) 65'
RW	10	Fábio Lima		(substituted off) 40'
AM	9	Ali Saleh		(substituted off) 66'
LW	11	Caio Canedo		(substituted off) 55'
CF	23	Sultan Adil	(yellow card) 16'
Substitutions:
DF	4	Khalid Al-Hashemi		(substituted on) 40'
FW	20	Yahya Al-Ghassani		(substituted on) 55'
DF	3	Zayed Sultan		(substituted on) 65'
MF	5	Ali Salmeen		(substituted on) 65'
MF	21	Harib Abdalla		(substituted on) 66'
Manager:
(Portugal) Paulo Bento			(yellow card) 45+1' (yellow-red card) 90+9'

Man of the Match:
Khalid Eisa (United Arab Emirates)

Assistant referees:
Abdulhadi Al-Anezi (Kuwait)
Ahmad Abbas (Kuwait)
Fourth official:
Ahmed Al-Kaf (Oman)
Reserve assistant referee:
Abu Bakar Al-Amri (Oman)
Video assistant referee:
Abdulrahman Al-Jassim (Qatar)
Assistant video assistant referees:
Abdullah Jamali (Kuwait)

=== Hong Kong vs Iran ===
This was the sides' first meeting in an Asian Cup since 1968. Iran had previously faced Hong Kong seven times, all competitive fixtures, with Hong Kong recording one win and Iran six, including their most recent encounter as part of 2026 FIFA World Cup qualification, which Iran won 4–0.

Hong Kong surprised Iran with some long-range efforts and duels won over Iranian players, particularly when a poor attempt to kick the ball away by the Iranians ended up hitting Everton Camargo as he put his shot wide. In the 24th minute, however, Mehdi Taremi would provide a clinical pass for Mehdi Ghayedi from a breakthrough the defence, before Ghayedi finished in the bottom left of Hong Kong's net to score Iran's only goal, and also the only goal of the match to secure Iran's win.

19 January 2024
20:30

Hong Kong	0–1	Iran
	Report	Ghayedi 24'

Khalifa International Stadium, Al Rayyan
Attendance: 36,412
Referee: Hanna Hattab (Syria)

Hong Kong	Iran

GK	1	Yapp Hung Fai (c)
RB	21	Yue Tze Nam
CB	3	Oliver Gerbig
CB	4	Vas Nuñez	(yellow card) 47'
LB	17	Shinichi Chan		(substituted off) 90'
CM	6	Wu Chun Ming	(yellow card) 37'	(substituted off) 90'
CM	8	Tan Chun Lok
RW	11	Everton Camargo
AM	16	Chan Siu Kwan		(substituted off) 73'
LW	23	Sun Ming Him		(substituted off) 73'
CF	9	Matt Orr		(substituted off) 73'
Substitutions:
MF	10	Wong Wai		(substituted on) 73'
FW	20	Michael Udebuluzor		(substituted on) 73'
FW	25	Stefan Pereira		(substituted on) 73'
MF	15	Chang Hei Yin		(substituted on) 90'
FW	14	Poon Pui Hin		(substituted on) 90'
Manager:
(Norway) Jørn Andersen

GK	1	Alireza Beiranvand
RB	23	Ramin Rezaeian
CB	13	Hossein Kanaanizadegan
CB	19	Majid Hosseini	(substituted off) 65'
LB	5	Milad Mohammadi
CM	15	Rouzbeh Cheshmi
CM	14	Saman Ghoddos
RW	7	Alireza Jahanbakhsh (c)	(substituted off) 81'
AM	9	Mehdi Taremi	(substituted off) 77'
LW	18	Mehdi Ghayedi	(substituted off) 65'
CF	26	Shahriyar Moghanlou	(substituted off) 65'
Substitutions:
MF	6	Saeid Ezatolahi	(substituted on) 65'
FW	10	Karim Ansarifard	(substituted on) 65'
MF	21	Mohammad Mohebi	(substituted on) 65'
MF	8	Omid Ebrahimi	(substituted on) 77'
DF	3	Ehsan Hajsafi	(substituted on) 81'
Manager:
Amir Ghalenoei

Man of the Match:
Milad Mohammadi (Iran)

Assistant referees:
Ali Ahmad (Syria)
Mohamad Kazzaz (Syria)
Fourth official:
Ko Hyung-jin (South Korea)
Reserve assistant referee:
Park Sang-jun (South Korea)
Video assistant referee:
Hiroyuki Kimura (Japan)
Assistant video assistant referees:
Kate Jacewicz (Australia)

=== Iran vs United Arab Emirates ===
This was the sides' first meeting in the Asian Cup since 2015, which Iran won 1–0. Iran also won by the same scoreline when the sides met during 2022 FIFA World Cup qualification, both home and away.

Iran quickly proved their dominance in the match, and it paid off in the 26th minute when a clinical one-touch play from Sardar Azmoun met Mehdi Taremi in the right position, as he overcame two remaining Emirati defenders to open the scoring, before Ali Gholizadeh had another header in the 36th minute ruled out for offside. Iran's rampant pressure consistently pushed the Emiratis to the brink, but as Iran poured everything into a second goal, an Emirati counterattack saw Yahya Al-Ghassani sneak into the Iranian penalty area before being fouled by Hossein Kanaanizadegan, which resulted in a yellow card for Kanaani and a penalty for the UAE. However, Al-Ghassani then squandered the 63rd minute spot kick, and his team was made to pay the price two minutes later, when a misjudged pass by Khalid Ibrahim was intercepted by Azmoun, whose backheel pass for Taremi allowed the latter to strike Iran's second goal. Iran had two more goals ruled out by VAR, first for an offside from Azmoun and then a second from Mohammad Mohebi due to his earlier foul on Emirati midfielder Majid Rashid. As the match drew to a close, in the third minute of stoppage time, Al-Ghassani redeemed himself when he got on the end of a rebound from Abdullah Ramadan's long-ranged shot, which he was able to head home; while it did not alter the match's outcome, Al-Ghassani's goal secured the Emiratis second place and progression from the group.

23 January 2024
18:00

Iran	2–1	United Arab Emirates
Taremi 26', 65'	Report	Al-Ghassani 90+3'

Education City Stadium, Al Rayyan
Attendance: 34,259
Referee: Ilgiz Tantashev (Uzbekistan)

Iran	United Arab Emirates

GK	1	Alireza Beiranvand
RB	2	Sadegh Moharrami	(yellow card) 41'	(substituted off) 45'
CB	13	Hossein Kanaanizadegan	(yellow card) 62'
CB	4	Shojae Khalilzadeh
LB	3	Ehsan Hajsafi (c)
CM	6	Saeid Ezatolahi
CM	14	Saman Ghoddos		(substituted off) 67'
RW	17	Ali Gholizadeh		(substituted off) 67'
AM	9	Mehdi Taremi
LW	18	Mehdi Ghayedi		(substituted off) 67'
CF	20	Sardar Azmoun		(substituted off) 87'
Substitutions:
DF	23	Ramin Rezaeian		(substituted on) 45'
MF	8	Omid Ebrahimi		(substituted on) 67'
MF	21	Mohammad Mohebi		(substituted on) 67'
MF	7	Alireza Jahanbakhsh		(substituted on) 67'
FW	11	Reza Asadi		(substituted on) 87'
Manager:
Amir Ghalenoei

GK	17	Khalid Eisa (c)
CB	19	Khalid Ibrahim	(yellow card) 72'	(substituted off) 74'
CB	4	Khalid Al-Hashemi
CB	26	Bader Nasser
RB	3	Zayed Sultan
CM	6	Majid Rashid		(substituted off) 85'
CM	18	Abdullah Ramadan
LM	21	Harib Abdalla
RF	8	Tahnoon Al-Zaabi	(yellow card) 54'	(substituted off) 57'
CF	20	Yahya Al-Ghassani
LF	9	Ali Saleh		(substituted off) 85'
Substitutions:
FW	11	Caio Canedo		(substituted on) 57'
DF	2	Abdulla Idrees		(substituted on) 74'
MF	14	Abdulla Hamad		(substituted on) 85'
FW	10	Fábio Lima		(substituted on) 85'
Manager:
(Portugal) Sérgio Costa (Note: United Arab Emirates manager Paulo Bento was suspended for the match due to his sending off in United Arab Emirates's match against Palestine. Assistant manager Sérgio Costa filled in as manager.)

Man of the Match:
Mehdi Taremi (Iran)

Assistant referees:
Andrey Tsapenko (Uzbekistan)
Timur Gaynullin (Uzbekistan)
Fourth official:
Adham Makhadmeh (Jordan)
Reserve assistant referee:
Ahmad Al-Roalle (Jordan)
Video assistant referee:
Mohammed Al Hoish (Saudi Arabia)
Assistant video assistant referees:
Abdullah Jamali (Kuwait)

=== Hong Kong vs Palestine ===
This marked the sides' first meeting in 23 years, a 2002 FIFA World Cup qualification fixture won 1–0 by Palestine.

The Palestinians got off to a dream start when, after opening the match aggressively, Musab Al-Battat received a pass before sneaking into Hong Kong's left flank, providing a clinical aerial delivery to Oday Dabbagh, whose header hit the ground and then went into the net to open the score in the 12th minute. Al-Battat then repeated the same trick in the 48th minute, when his clinical delivery reached Zaid Qunbar, who capitalised with another header for the second Palestine goal. In the 60th minute, from a failed attempt to score from Hong Kong, the Palestinians provided a quick counterattack, with Tamer Seyam striking the crossbar before the ball rebounded to Dabbagh once again, who didn't miss the opportunity to score his side's third goal. Hong Kong had a final chance to get on the scoresheet at the fourth minute of second-half stoppage time, when Al-Battat let his hand touch the ball from an effort by Everton Camargo, but Camargo himself then failed to convert the penalty which ensured the final scoreline.

This was Palestine's first-ever victory in Asian Cup history, and with four points, they managed to advance past the group stage for the first time ever.

23 January 2024
18:00

Hong Kong	0–3	Palestine
	Report	Dabbagh 12', 60'; Z. Qunbar 48'

Abdullah bin Khalifa Stadium, Doha
Attendance: 6,568
Referee: Shaun Evans (Australia)

Hong Kong	Palestine

GK	19	Tse Ka Wing
RB	21	Yue Tze Nam
CB	4	Vas Nuñez (c)		(substituted off) 28'
CB	3	Oliver Gerbig
LB	17	Shinichi Chan		(substituted off) 70'
CM	6	Wu Chun Ming		(substituted off) 56'
CM	8	Tan Chun Lok	(yellow card) 76'
RW	11	Everton Camargo
AM	16	Chan Siu Kwan		(substituted off) 56'
LW	9	Matt Orr	(yellow card) 86'
CF	20	Michael Udebuluzor		(substituted off) 70'
Substitutions:
DF	13	Li Ngai Hoi		(substituted on) 28'
MF	10	Wong Wai		(substituted on) 56'
FW	26	Juninho		(substituted on) 56'
FW	25	Stefan Pereira		(substituted on) 70'
DF	23	Sun Ming Him		(substituted on) 70'
Manager:
(Norway) Jørn Andersen

GK	22	Rami Hamadeh
RB	7	Musab Al-Battat (c)
CB	15	Michel Termanini
CB	5	Mohammed Saleh
LB	2	Mohammed Khalil
RM	9	Tamer Seyam	(substituted off) 82'
CM	6	Oday Kharoub
CM	18	Amid Mahajna	(substituted off) 82'
LM	10	Mahmoud Abu Warda	(substituted off) 69'
CF	11	Oday Dabbagh	(substituted off) 85'
CF	20	Zaid Qunbar	(substituted off) 69'
Substitutions:
MF	3	Mohammed Rashid	(substituted on) 69'
FW	8	Hassan Alaa Aldeen	(substituted on) 69'
MF	21	Islam Batran	(substituted on) 82'
MF	14	Samer Zubaida	(substituted on) 82'
FW	19	Mahmoud Wadi	(substituted on) 85'
Manager:
(Tunisia) Makram Daboub

Man of the Match:
Musab Al-Battat (Palestine)

Assistant referees:
Anton Shchetinin (Australia)
Ashley Beecham (Australia)
Fourth official:
Abdulrahman Al-Jassim (Qatar)
Reserve assistant referee:
Taleb Al-Marri (Qatar)
Video assistant referee:
Abdulla Al-Marri (Qatar)
Assistant video assistant referees:
Ko Hyung-jin (South Korea)

== Discipline ==
Fair play points would have been used as tiebreakers if the overall and head-to-head records of teams were tied. These were calculated based on yellow and red cards received in all group matches as follows:

- first yellow card: −1 point;
- indirect red card (second yellow card): −3 points;
- direct red card: −3 points;
- yellow card and direct red card: −4 points;

Only one of the above deductions was applied to a player in a single match.

Team	Match 1				Match 2				Match 3				Points
Team	Booked	(yellow card) (yellow-red card)	Sent off (straight red)	(yellow card) (red card)	Booked	(yellow card) (yellow-red card)	Sent off (straight red)	(yellow card) (red card)	Booked	(yellow card) (yellow-red card)	Sent off (straight red)	(yellow card) (red card)	Points
Iran	1								2				–3
Hong Kong	2				2				2				–6
Palestine	6				1								–7
United Arab Emirates	1				1		1		2				–7
