= Hong Kong at the AFC Asian Cup =

National football delegation

Hong Kong is one of the earliest participants in the AFC Asian Cup, and was also the first host in the tournament, in the inaugural 1956 edition. Hong Kong, since then, had qualified for two another tournaments in 1964 and 1968. The best result of Hong Kong is third place and it has remained as Hong Kong's best achievement in football.

In 2022, Hong Kong qualified for the 2023 Asian Cup for the first time in 55 years. Hong Kong scored the 1st and the 1000th goal in AFC Asian Cup history.

== Competitive record ==
AFC Asian Cup record									AFC Asian Cup qualification record					
Year	Result	Position	Pld	W	D*	L	GF	GA	Pld	W	D	L	GF	GA
(Hong Kong) 1956	Third place	3rd	3	0	2	1	6	7	Qualified as hosts					
(South Korea) 1960	Did not qualify								2	1	0	1	11	7
(Israel) 1964	Fourth place	4th	3	0	0	3	1	5	3	2	1	0	11	7
(Iran) 1968	Fifth place	5th	4	0	1	3	2	11	4	4	0	0	9	1
(Thailand) 1972	Did not qualify								3	0	0	3	3	6
(Iran) 1976	Did not qualify								5	1	2	2	6	5
(Kuwait) 1980	Did not qualify								6	3	1	2	10	6
(Singapore) 1984	Did not qualify								4	0	2	2	1	4
(Qatar) 1988	Did not qualify								4	0	1	3	0	5
(Japan) 1992	Did not qualify								3	0	3	0	2	2
(United Arab Emirates) 1996	Did not qualify								3	2	0	1	12	3
(Lebanon) 2000	Did not qualify								4	2	1	1	7	5
(China) 2004	Did not qualify								8	2	2	4	10	14
(Indonesia) (Malaysia) (Thailand) (Vietnam) 2007	Did not qualify								6	2	2	2	5	7
(Qatar) 2011	Did not qualify								6	0	1	5	1	18
(Australia) 2015	Did not qualify								6	1	1	4	2	13
(United Arab Emirates) 2019	Did not qualify								14	5	4	5	17	12
(Qatar) 2023	Group stage	23rd	3	0	0	3	1	7	11	3	2	6	9	18
(Saudi Arabia) 2027	To be determined								10	2	3	5	9	17
Total	Third place	4/18	13	0	3	10	10	30	102	30	26	46	125	150

== 1956 AFC Asian Cup ==
Team	Pld	W	D	L	GF	GA	GD	Pts
South Korea	3	2	1	0	9	6	+3	5
Israel	3	2	0	1	6	5	+1	4
Hong Kong	3	0	2	1	6	7	−1	2
South Vietnam	3	0	1	2	6	9	−3	1

1 September 1956
19:00

Hong Kong	2–3	Israel
Au Chi Yin 12', 66'		Glazer 37', 76'; Stelmach 69'

Government Stadium, Hong Kong
Attendance: 30,000
Referee: H.A. Sheppard (England)

6 September 1956
19:00

South Korea	2–2	Hong Kong
Kim Ji-sung 45'; Choi Kwang-seok 62'		Tang Yee Kit 10'; Ko Po Keung 39'

Government Stadium, Hong Kong
Attendance: 30,000

9 September 1956
19:00

South Vietnam	2–2	Hong Kong
Trần Văn Tổng 30'; Lê Hữu Đức 64'		Chu Wing Wah 59' (pen.); Lau Chi Lam 79'

Government Stadium, Hong Kong
Attendance: 30,000

== 1964 AFC Asian Cup ==
Team	Pld	W	D	L	GF	GA	GD	Pts
Israel	3	3	0	0	5	1	+4	6
India	3	2	0	1	5	3	+2	4
South Korea	3	1	0	2	2	4	−2	2
Hong Kong	3	0	0	3	1	5	−4	0

26 May 1964
16:30

Israel	1–0	Hong Kong
Spiegler 76'

Ramat Gan Stadium, Ramat Gan
Attendance: 25,000
Referee: Patrick Nice (Malaysia)

30 May 1964
16:30

South Korea	1–0	Hong Kong
Park Seung-ok 74'

Hebrew University Stadium, Jerusalem
Attendance: 7,000
Referee: Pisit Ngarampanich (Thailand)

2 June 1964
16:30

India	3–1	Hong Kong
I. Singh 45'; Samajapati 60'; Goswami 77'		Cheung Yiu Kwok 39'

Bloomfield Stadium, Tel Aviv
Attendance: 5,000
Referee: Patrick Nice (Malaysia)

== 1968 AFC Asian Cup ==
Team	Pld	W	D	L	GF	GA	GD	Pts
Iran	4	4	0	0	11	2	+9	8
Burma	4	2	1	1	5	4	+1	5
Israel	4	2	0	2	11	5	+6	4
Republic of China	4	0	2	2	3	10	−7	2
Hong Kong	4	0	1	3	2	11	−9	1

10 May 1968

Iran	2–0	Hong Kong
Behzadi 70'; Jabbari 88'

Amjadieh Stadium, Tehran
Attendance: 28,000
Referee: Norman Boswell (Malaysia)

12 May 1968

Hong Kong	1–6	Israel
Yuan Kuan Yick 76'		Spiegler 9', 53'; Spiegel 52', 65'; Romano 61', 71'

Amjadieh Stadium, Tehran
Attendance: 30,000
Referee: Batha Chaterchi (India)

15 May 1968

Hong Kong	1–1	Republic of China
Li Kwok Keung		Lo Kwok Tai

Amjadieh Stadium, Tehran

18 May 1968

Burma	2–0	Hong Kong

Amjadieh Stadium, Tehran

== 2023 AFC Asian Cup ==
=== Group C ===
Pos	Team	Pld	W	D	L	GF	GA	GD	Pts	Qualification
1	Iran	3	3	0	0	7	2	+5	9	Advance to knockout stage
2	United Arab Emirates	3	1	1	1	5	4	+1	4	Advance to knockout stage
3	Palestine	3	1	1	1	5	5	0	4	Advance to knockout stage
4	Hong Kong	3	0	0	3	1	7	−6	0	

Source: AFC
14 January 2024
17:30

United Arab Emirates	3–1	Hong Kong
Adil 34' (pen.); Sultan 52'; Al-Ghassani 90+5' (pen.)	Report	Chan Siu Kwan 49'

Khalifa International Stadium, Al Rayyan
Attendance: 15,586
Referee: Muhammad Taqi (Singapore)

19 January 2024
20:30

Hong Kong	0–1	Iran
	Report	Ghayedi 24'

Khalifa International Stadium, Al Rayyan
Attendance: 36,412
Referee: Hanna Hattab (Syria)

23 January 2024
18:00

Hong Kong	0–3	Palestine
	Report	Dabbagh 12', 60'; Z. Qunbar 48'

Abdullah bin Khalifa Stadium, Doha
Attendance: 6,568
Referee: Shaun Evans (Australia)

== Squads ==
- 1956 AFC Asian Cup squads
- 1964 AFC Asian Cup squads
- 1968 AFC Asian Cup squads
- 2023 AFC Asian Cup squads
