= Palestine at the AFC Asian Cup =

National football delegation

Palestine participated in their maiden AFC Asian Cup, the 2015 tournament, held in Australia. It was the first time Palestine qualified for the Asian Cup and in a major tournament, and this performance has been accredited for the rise of Palestine in the international arena, and the team is widely seen as the symbol of unity for Palestinians amidst the conflict between Hamas and Fatah over control of Palestinian Authority. Their second competition appearance came in 2019. Palestine qualified for the Asian Cup for the third consecutive time in 2023. It was the first ever time that Palestine qualified for the knockout round of the Asian Cup bringing hope to Palestinians amidst the Gaza war.

== Overall record ==
AFC Asian Cup record									Qualification record					
Year	Result	Position	Pld	W	D*	L	GF	GA	Pld	W	D*	L	GF	GA
(Hong Kong) 1956 to (United Arab Emirates) 1996	Did not enter								Did not enter					
(Lebanon) 2000	Did not qualify								4	1	0	3	3	8
(China) 2004	Did not qualify								6	0	2	4	3	11
(Indonesia) (Malaysia) (Thailand) (Vietnam) 2007	Did not qualify								5	1	1	3	3	9
(Qatar) 2011	Did not qualify								2	0	2	0	1	1
(Australia) 2015	Group stage	16th	3	0	0	3	1	11	13	8	3	2	18	7
(United Arab Emirates) 2019	Group stage	17th	3	0	2	1	0	3	14	9	2	3	49	8
(Qatar) 2023	Round of 16	14th	4	1	1	2	6	7	11	6	1	4	20	10
(Saudi Arabia) 2027	Qualified								6	2	2	2	6	6
Total	Round of 16	4/19	10	1	3	6	7	21	46	19	8	19	84	52

*Denotes draws include knockout matches decided via penalty shoot-out.

== By match ==
AFC Asian Cup History
Year	Round	Score	Result
2015
2015	Round 1	Palestine 0 – 4 Japan	Loss
2015	Round 1	Palestine 1 – 5 Jordan	Loss
2015	Round 1	Palestine 0 – 2 Iraq	Loss
2019
2019	Round 1	Palestine 0 – 0 Syria	Draw
2019	Round 1	Palestine 0 – 3 Australia	Loss
2019	Round 1	Palestine 0 – 0 Jordan	Draw
2023
2023	Round 1	Palestine 1 – 4 Iran	Loss
2023	Round 1	Palestine 1 – 1 United Arab Emirates	Draw
2023	Round 1	Palestine 3 – 0 Hong Kong	Win
2023	Round of 16	Palestine 1 – 2 Qatar	Loss

== Participation ==
=== 2015 Australia ===
Group D

Pos	Team	Pld	W	D	L	GF	GA	GD	Pts	Qualification
1	Japan	3	3	0	0	7	0	+7	9	Advance to knockout stage
2	Iraq	3	2	0	1	3	1	+2	6	Advance to knockout stage
3	Jordan	3	1	0	2	5	4	+1	3	
4	Palestine	3	0	0	3	1	11	−10	0	

Source: Asian Cup Australia 2015
Rules for classification: Tiebreakers

12 January 2015
Japan	4–0	Palestine	Newcastle Stadium, Newcastle
16 January 2015
Palestine	1–5	Jordan	AAMI Park, Melbourne
20 January 2015
Iraq	2–0	Palestine	Canberra Stadium, Canberra

Palestine's maiden Asian Cup debut occurred in 2015 when they were grouped with Japan, Iraq and Jordan, and thus it was a significant moment for the Palestinian team. Their opening match was against reigning champions Japan which ended in a 0-4 loss. Palestine suffered another loss in their next match, 1–5 to Jordan, in which Jaka Ihbeisheh scored their first ever goal in the Asian Cup. Palestine ended their campaign by a 0–2 defeat to Iraq, thus ended last with zero point.

=== 2019 UAE ===
Group B

Pos	Team	Pld	W	D	L	GF	GA	GD	Pts	Qualification
1	Jordan	3	2	1	0	3	0	+3	7	Advance to knockout stage
2	Australia	3	2	0	1	6	3	+3	6	Advance to knockout stage
3	Palestine	3	0	2	1	0	3	−3	2	
4	Syria	3	0	1	2	2	5	−3	1	

Source: AFC
6 January 2019
20:00

Syria	0–0	Palestine
	Report

Sharjah Stadium, Sharjah
Attendance: 8,471
Referee: Ravshan Irmatov (Uzbekistan)

11 January 2019
15:00

Palestine	0–3	Australia
	Report	Maclaren 18'; Mabil 20'; Giannou 90'

Rashid Stadium, Dubai
Attendance: 11,915
Referee: Valentin Kovalenko (Uzbekistan)

15 January 2019
17:30

Palestine	0–0	Jordan
	Report

Mohammed bin Zayed Stadium, Abu Dhabi
Attendance: 20,843
Referee: Mohanad Qassim (Iraq)

Palestine made their second appearance in the tournament, having been drawn with two Levant rivals, Syria and Jordan, as well as for the second time in a row against defending champions, Australia. Palestine, in this tournament, had successfully achieved two points for the first time, with two draws against Syria and Jordan, both ending 0–0. However, their encounter against Australia ended with a 0–3 defeat, which meant that Palestine obtained two points and finished without a goal scored in the tournament. They were eliminated from the tournament as they did not have enough points to qualify as a third-placed team.

=== 2023 Qatar ===
Group C

Pos	Team	Pld	W	D	L	GF	GA	GD	Pts	Qualification
1	Iran	3	3	0	0	7	2	+5	9	Advance to knockout stage
2	United Arab Emirates	3	1	1	1	5	4	+1	4	Advance to knockout stage
3	Palestine	3	1	1	1	5	5	0	4	Advance to knockout stage
4	Hong Kong	3	0	0	3	1	7	−6	0	

Source: AFC
14 January 2024
20:30

Iran	4–1	Palestine
Ansarifard 2'; Khalilzadeh 12'; Ghayedi 38'; Azmoun 55'	Report	Seyam 45+6'

Education City Stadium, Al Rayyan
Attendance: 27,691
Referee: Abdulrahman Al-Jassim (Qatar)

18 January 2024
20:30

Palestine	1–1	United Arab Emirates
Nasser 50' (o.g.)	Report	Adil 23'

Al Janoub Stadium, Al Wakrah
Attendance: 41,986
Referee: Ahmad Al-Ali (Kuwait)

23 January 2024
18:00

Hong Kong	0–3	Palestine
	Report	Dabbagh 12', 60'; Z. Qunbar 48'

Abdullah bin Khalifa Stadium, Doha
Attendance: 6,568
Referee: Shaun Evans (Australia)

Ranking of third-placed teams

Pos	Grp	Team	Pld	W	D	L	GF	GA	GD	Pts	Qualification
1	E	Jordan	3	1	1	1	6	3	+3	4	Advance to knockout stage
2	C	Palestine	3	1	1	1	5	5	0	4	Advance to knockout stage
3	B	Syria	3	1	1	1	1	1	0	4	Advance to knockout stage
4	D	Indonesia	3	1	0	2	3	6	−3	3	Advance to knockout stage
5	F	Oman	3	0	2	1	2	3	−1	2	
6	A	China	3	0	2	1	0	1	−1	2	

Source: AFC

Knockout stage

Round of 16

29 January 2024
19:00

Qatar	2–1	Palestine
Al-Haydos 45+6'; Afif 49' (pen.)	Report	Dabbagh 37'

Al Bayt Stadium, Al Khor
Attendance: 63,753
Referee: Ma Ning (China)
