= 2023 AFC Asian Cup officials =

The following is a list of match officials (referees, assistant referees, and video assistant referees) who officiated at the 2023 AFC Asian Cup in Qatar.

== Referees and assistant referees ==
On 14 September 2023, the Asian Football Confederation (AFC) announced the list of 33 referees, 37 assistant referees, two stand-by referees and two stand-by assistant referees for the tournament, including two female referees and three female assistant referees. (This included Yoshimi Yamashita, who became the first woman to referee at any AFC Asian Cup.) Video Assistant Referee (VAR) was used for the entire tournament following its implementation from the quarter-final stage onwards in the 2019 edition. The Semi-Automated Offside Technology (SAOT) system, which utilised twelve specialised cameras and artificial intelligence, was also implemented at all 51 matches. This marked the first time that SAOT was in place at an AFC competition and made the AFC the first confederation to apply the system at the continental men's national team level.

On 11 January 2023, AFC announced that Iranian-born Australian referee Alireza Faghani would adjudicate the first match of the tournament.

On 8 February 2024, Ma Ning was appointed to take charge of the 2023 AFC Asian Cup final between Jordan and Qatar in Doha on 10 February 2024.

Referees	Assistants	Matches assigned	Fourth official	Video Assistance Referees (VAR/AVAR)
Shaun Evans (Australia)	Anton Shchetinin (Australia); Ashley Beecham (Australia)	Saudi Arabia–Oman (Group F); Hong Kong–Palestine (Group C)	Qatar–China (Group A)	Qatar–Lebanon (Group A); Bahrain–Malaysia (Group E)
Alireza Faghani (Australia)	Anton Shchetinin (Australia); Ashley Beecham (Australia)	Qatar–Lebanon (Group A); Iraq–Jordan (Round of 16)	Oman–Thailand (Group F); Iraq–Vietnam (Group D)	
Kate Jacewicz (Australia)				Qatar–Lebanon (Group A); United Arab Emirates–Hong Kong (Group C); Saudi Arabia–Oman (Group F); Hong Kong–Iran (Group C)
Fu Ming (China)	Zhou Fei (China); Zhang Cheng (China)	India–Uzbekistan (Group B); Tajikistan–Jordan (Quarter-finals)		South Korea–Bahrain (Group E); Vietnam–Indonesia (Group D); Kyrgyzstan–Saudi Arabia (Group F); Australia–Uzbekistan (Group B); Iraq–Vietnam (Group D); Qatar–Palestine (Round of 16); Iran–Qatar (Semi-finals); Jordan–Qatar (Final)
Ma Ning (China)	Zhou Fei (China); Zhang Cheng (China)	South Korea–Bahrain (Group E); Qatar–Palestine (Round of 16); Jordan–Qatar (Final)	Kyrgyzstan–Saudi Arabia (Group F); Australia–Uzbekistan (Group B); Jordan–Bahrain (Group E); Jordan–South Korea (Semi-finals)	
Ma Ning (China)	Anton Shchetinin (Australia); Ashley Beecham (Australia)	Iran–Japan (Quarter-finals)	Kyrgyzstan–Saudi Arabia (Group F); Australia–Uzbekistan (Group B); Jordan–Bahrain (Group E); Jordan–South Korea (Semi-finals)	
Mooud Bonyadifard (Iran)	Saeid Ghasemi (Iran); Alireza Ildorom (Iran)	Oman–Thailand (Group F)	Japan–Vietnam (Group D); Syria–Australia (Group B)	
Mohanad Qasim Sarray (Iraq)	Watheq Al-Swaiedi (Iraq); Ahmed Al-Baghdadi (Iraq)	Tajikistan–Lebanon (Group A)	Uzbekistan–Syria (Group B); Bahrain–Malaysia (Group E); Bahrain–Japan (Round of 16)	
Yusuke Araki (Japan)	Jun Mihara (Japan); Takumi Takagi (Japan)	Australia–Uzbekistan (Group B); Tajikistan–United Arab Emirates (Round of 16)	Australia–India (Group B); South Korea–Bahrain (Group E); Tajikistan–Jordan (Quarter-finals)	Tajikistan–Qatar (Group A); India–Uzbekistan (Group B); Kyrgyzstan–Saudi Arabia (Group F)
Jumpei Iida (Japan)	Jun Mihara (Japan); Takumi Takagi (Japan)	Kyrgyzstan–Saudi Arabia (Group F)	Iran–Qatar (Semi-finals)	Australia–India (Group B); Saudi Arabia–Oman (Group F); Tajikistan–Qatar (Group A); Australia–Uzbekistan (Group B); Tajikistan–United Arab Emirates (Round of 16); Tajikistan–Jordan (Quarter-finals); Jordan–South Korea (Semi-finals); Jordan–Qatar (Final)
Hiroyuki Kimura (Japan)	Jun Mihara (Japan); Takumi Takagi (Japan)	Tajikistan–Qatar (Group A)		Australia–India (Group B); Hong Kong–Iran (Group C)
Yoshimi Yamashita (Japan)	Makoto Bozono (Japan); Naomi Teshirogi (Japan)	Australia–India (Group B)	Tajikistan–Qatar (Group A)	
Adham Makhadmeh (Jordan)	Mohammad Al-Kalaf (Jordan); Ahmad Al-Roalle (Jordan)	Thailand–Kyrgyzstan (Group F)	India–Uzbekistan (Group B); Iran–United Arab Emirates (Group C); Kyrgyzstan–Oman (Group F); Saudi Arabia–South Korea (Round of 16)	
Kim Hee-gon (South Korea)	Yoon Jae-yeol (South Korea); Park Sang-jun (South Korea)	Saudi Arabia–Thailand (Group F); Qatar–Uzbekistan (Quarter-finals)	Thailand–Kyrgyzstan (Group F)	Japan–Vietnam (Group D); Lebanon–China (Group A); Iran–Syria (Round of 16)
Kim Jong-hyeok (South Korea)	Yoon Jae-yeol (South Korea); Park Sang-jun (South Korea)	Japan–Vietnam (Group D); Iran–Syria (Round of 16)	Syria–India (Group B)	Lebanon–China (Group A); Saudi Arabia–Thailand (Group F); Qatar–Uzbekistan (Quarter-finals)
Ko Hyung-jin (South Korea)	Park Sang-jun (South Korea); Kim Kyoung-min (South Korea)	Lebanon–China (Group A)	Qatar–Lebanon (Group A); Hong Kong–Iran (Group C)	Japan–Vietnam (Group D); Hong Kong–Palestine (Group C); Saudi Arabia–Thailand (Group F)
Mohammed Al Hoish (Saudi Arabia)	Zaid Al-Shammari (Saudi Arabia); Yasir Al-Sultan (Saudi Arabia)	China–Tajikistan (Group A)	Malaysia–Jordan (Group E); Tajikistan–United Arab Emirates (Round of 16)	Iraq–Japan (Group D); Tajikistan–Lebanon (Group A); Iran–United Arab Emirates (Group C); South Korea–Malaysia (Group E)
Khalid Al-Turais (Saudi Arabia)	Zaid Al-Shammari (Saudi Arabia); Yasir Al-Sultan (Saudi Arabia)	Iraq–Japan (Group D); South Korea–Malaysia (Group E)		China–Tajikistan (Group A); Tajikistan–Lebanon (Group A); Uzbekistan–Thailand (Round of 16)
Ahmad Al-Ali (Kuwait)	Abdulhadi Al-Anezi (Kuwait); Ahmad Abbas (Kuwait)	Palestine–United Arab Emirates (Group C); Kyrgyzstan–Oman (Group F); Bahrain–Japan (Round of 16)	United Arab Emirates–Hong Kong (Group C); Qatar–Palestine (Round of 16)	Qatar–China (Group A); Saudi Arabia–South Korea (Round of 16); Qatar–Uzbekistan (Quarter-finals)
Ahmad Al-Ali (Kuwait)	Abdulhadi Al-Anezi (Kuwait); Mohamad Zairul Bin Khalil Tan (Malaysia)	Iran–Qatar (Semi-finals)	United Arab Emirates–Hong Kong (Group C); Qatar–Palestine (Round of 16)	Qatar–China (Group A); Saudi Arabia–South Korea (Round of 16); Qatar–Uzbekistan (Quarter-finals)
Abdullah Jamali (Kuwait)	Abdulhadi Al-Anezi (Kuwait); Ahmad Abbas (Kuwait)	Qatar–China (Group A)	Saudi Arabia–Oman (Group F); Australia–Indonesia (Round of 16); Qatar–Uzbekistan (Quarter-finals)	China–Tajikistan (Group A); Palestine–United Arab Emirates (Group C); Iran–United Arab Emirates (Group C); Kyrgyzstan–Oman (Group F)
Nazmi Nasaruddin (Malaysia)	Mohamad Zairul Bin Khalil Tan (Malaysia); Mohd Arif Shamil Bin Abd Rasid (Malaysia)	Iraq–Vietnam (Group D); Uzbekistan–Thailand (Round of 16)	China–Tajikistan (Group A); Iraq–Japan (Group D); Iran–Japan (Quarter-finals)	
Ahmed Al-Kaf (Oman)	Abu Bakar Al-Amri (Oman); Rashid Al-Ghaithi (Oman)	Uzbekistan–Syria (Group B); Bahrain–Malaysia (Group E); Australia–South Korea (Quarter-finals)	Palestine–United Arab Emirates (Group C); Tajikistan–Lebanon (Group A); Uzbekistan–Thailand (Round of 16)	
Abdulrahman Al-Jassim (Qatar)	Taleb Al-Marri (Qatar); Saoud Al-Maqaleh (Qatar)	Iran–Palestine (Group C)	Hong Kong–Palestine (Group C); South Korea–Malaysia (Group E); Iraq–Jordan (Round of 16); Iran–Syria (Round of 16)	Palestine–United Arab Emirates (Group C); Jordan–South Korea (Group E)
Abdulla Al-Marri (Qatar)				Iran–Palestine (Group C); Syria–Australia (Group B); Jordan–South Korea (Group E); Hong Kong–Palestine (Group C)
Khamis Al-Marri (Qatar)	Taleb Al-Marri (Qatar); Saoud Al-Maqaleh (Qatar)	Japan–Indonesia (Group D)		Uzbekistan–Syria (Group B); Iran–Palestine (Group C); Iraq–Japan (Group D); South Korea–Malaysia (Group E); Iraq–Jordan (Round of 16); Iran–Syria (Round of 16)
Salman Ahmad Falahi (Qatar)	Taleb Al-Marri (Qatar); Saoud Al-Maqaleh (Qatar)	Jordan–South Korea (Group E)		Uzbekistan–Syria (Group B); Indonesia–Iraq (Group D); Japan–Indonesia (Group D); Iraq–Jordan (Round of 16)
Muhammad Taqi (Singapore)	Ronnie Koh Min Kiat (Singapore); Abdul Hannan Bin Abdul Hasim (Singapore)	United Arab Emirates–Hong Kong (Group C)		Oman–Thailand (Group F); Syria–India (Group B); Japan–Indonesia (Group D); Kyrgyzstan–Oman (Group F); Qatar–Palestine (Round of 16); Iran–Japan (Quarter-finals)
Hanna Hattab (Syria)	Ali Ahmad (Syria); Mohamad Kazzaz (Syria)	Hong Kong–Iran (Group C)	Iran–Palestine (Group C)	South Korea–Bahrain (Group E)
Sadullo Gulmurodi (Tajikistan)	Andrey Tsapenko (Uzbekistan); Timur Gaynullin (Uzbekistan)	Vietnam–Indonesia (Group D)	Indonesia–Iraq (Group D); Japan–Indonesia (Group D)	
Sivakorn Pu-udom (Thailand)	Rawut Nakarit (Thailand); Tanate Chuchuen (Thailand)	Syria–India (Group B)		United Arab Emirates–Hong Kong (Group C); Indonesia–Iraq (Group D); Vietnam–Indonesia (Group D); Iraq–Vietnam (Group D); Tajikistan–United Arab Emirates (Round of 16); Tajikistan–Jordan (Quarter-finals); Iran–Japan (Quarter-finals); Iran–Qatar (Semi-finals)
Omar Al-Ali (United Arab Emirates)	Mohamed Al-Hammadi (United Arab Emirates); Hasan Al-Mahri (United Arab Emirates)	Jordan–Bahrain (Group E)		Malaysia–Jordan (Group E); India–Uzbekistan (Group B); Bahrain–Malaysia (Group E); Australia–Indonesia (Round of 16); Uzbekistan–Thailand (Round of 16); Australia–South Korea (Quarter-finals); Jordan–South Korea (Semi-finals)
Adel Al-Naqbi (United Arab Emirates)	Mohamed Al-Hammadi (United Arab Emirates); Hasan Al-Mahri (United Arab Emirates)	Syria–Australia (Group B)	Jordan–South Korea (Group E); Australia–South Korea (Quarter-finals)	Malaysia–Jordan (Group E); Thailand–Kyrgyzstan (Group F); Qatar–China (Group A); Syria–India (Group B); Jordan–Bahrain (Group E); Australia–Indonesia (Round of 16); Saudi Arabia–South Korea (Round of 16); Bahrain–Japan (Round of 16)
Mohammed Abdulla Hassan Mohamed (United Arab Emirates)	Mohamed Al-Hammadi (United Arab Emirates); Hasan Al-Mahri (United Arab Emirates)	Malaysia–Jordan (Group E); Australia–Indonesia (Round of 16); Jordan–South Korea (Semi-finals)		Syria–Australia (Group B); Oman–Thailand (Group F); Jordan–Bahrain (Group E); Bahrain–Japan (Round of 16); Australia–South Korea (Quarter-finals)
Akhrol Riskullaev (Uzbekistan)				
Ilgiz Tantashev (Uzbekistan)	Andrey Tsapenko (Uzbekistan); Timur Gaynullin (Uzbekistan)	Indonesia–Iraq (Group D); Iran–United Arab Emirates (Group C); Saudi Arabia–South Korea (Round of 16)	Lebanon–China (Group A); Vietnam–Indonesia (Group D); Saudi Arabia–Thailand (Group F); Jordan–Qatar (Final)	
