= Ilgiz Tantashev =

Uzbek football referee (born 1984)

- Tantashev at the 2026 FIFA World Cup
- Born: 5 April 1984 (age 42); Bukhara, Uzbek SSR, Soviet Union (now Uzbekistan)

Domestic
Years	League	Role
2008–present	Uzbek football	Referee; Assistant referee

International
Years	League	Role
2013–present	FIFA listed	Referee

Ilgiz Tantashev (Uzbek: Илгиз Танташев; born 5 April 1984) is an Uzbek football referee who has been on the FIFA International Referees List since 2013.

== Career ==
Tantashev, a native of Bukhara, began his refereeing career as an assistant referee in 2008. He ascended as a central referee to the Uzbekistan Super League and later officiated in the Indian Super League and the Saudi Pro League.

Following his promotion to a FIFA international referee, Tantashev has taken part in numerous tournaments within the Asian Football Confederation (AFC), including the 2019 AFC Asian Cup and the 2023 AFC Asian Cup. In the latest AFC Asian Cup edition in Qatar, Tantashev was the fourth official in the final between Jordan and Qatar, with Chinese referee Ma Ning leading the officiating team. Other competitions within AFC include three youth tournaments of the AFC U-23 Asian Cup: the editions of 2016, 2020, and the 2022.

Outside the AFC, Tantashev was selected as a support official for the 2019 FIFA U-20 World Cup in Poland, and the men's tournament of the 2024 Summer Olympics in Paris. In the Olympics, Tantashev's final match was a semifinal between Morocco and Spain, where he was forced to abandon the game in the 11th minute due to a collision with Spanish defender Marc Pubill. Tantashev was replaced by Swedish referee Glenn Nyberg.

Aside from official tournaments, Tantashev has overseen friendly matches. He was named as the Best Referee of Uzbekistan in 2021.

=== 2026 FIFA World Cup ===
Tantashev was selected by FIFA to be a referee in the 2026 FIFA World Cup, along with fellow Uzbeks Timur Gaynullin and Andrey Tsapenko as assistant referees. In a group stage fixture between Scotland and Morocco, he explained he did not give Scotland a penalty for a foul in the area because the ball was going out of play.

German referee Patrick Ittrich declared Tantashev's refereeing of the Paraguay vs France last-16 match as "the worst performance at this World Cup". He faced criticism for his management of multiple incidents during the game. The match also saw a foul count of 13 committed by Paraguay and 11 by France, with France receiving three yellow cards and Paraguay receiving none. The officiating was widely criticised by fans and former footballers. French newspaper L'Équipe gave Tantashev a 1/10 score, calling his performance "absolute incompetence," pointing to the violent game by Paraguayan players and that Tantashev did not show Paraguay any yellow card. Russian former footballer and commentator Eduard Mor also criticized Tantashev's performance, saying that he lost control of the match while not sanctioning the violent game of the Paraguayan players. Tantashev was not given any further World Cup matches to referee.

== Selected performances ==
2023 AFC Asian Cup – Qatar
Date	Match	Result	Round	Venue
15 January 2024	Indonesia – Iraq	1–3	Group stage	Ahmad bin Ali Stadium, Al Rayyan
23 January 2024	Iran – United Arab Emirates	2–1	Group stage	Education City Stadium, Al Rayyan
30 January 2024	Saudi Arabia – South Korea	1–1 (2–4)	Round of 16	Education City Stadium, Al Rayyan
2026 FIFA World Cup – North America
Date	Match	Result	Round	Venue
19 June 2026	Scotland – Morocco	0–1	Group stage	Gillette Stadium, Foxborough
27 June 2026	Algeria – Austria	3–3	Group stage	Arrowhead Stadium, Kansas City
4 July 2026	Paraguay – France	0–1	Round of 16	Lincoln Financial Field, Philadelphia
