= 2020–21 UAE President's Cup =

Tournament details
- Country: United Arab Emirates
- Dates: 5 December 2020 – 13 May 2021
- Teams: 16 (Knockout round); 25 (Total)

Final positions
- Champions: Shabab Al Ahli (10th title)
- Runners-up: Al Nasr

Tournament statistics
- Matches played: 36
- Goals scored: 99 (2.75 per match)
- Top goal scorer(s): Ahmed Abunamous; Igor Jesus (3 goals each)

The 2020–21 UAE President's Cup was the 44th edition of the UAE President's Cup, following the cancellation of the 2019–20 UAE President's Cup due to the COVID-19 pandemic. Shabab Al Ahli won their tenth title after beating Al Nasr in the final.

== Preliminary round ==
The preliminary round was contested between the teams of the UAE Division 1 teams divided into two groups, 6 teams in group A, 5 teams in group B, the winner of each group advances to the knockout stage.

=== Group A ===
Team	Pld	W	D	L	GF	GA	GD	Pts
Emirates	5	3	2	0	15	6	+9	11
Al Bataeh	5	2	2	1	9	8	+1	8
Al Hamriyah	5	2	2	1	8	6	+2	8
Al Arabi	5	1	2	2	9	14	−5	5
Al Taawon	5	1	1	3	11	15	−4	4
Dibba Al Hisn	5	0	3	2	5	8	−3	3

Source: soccerway

=== Group B ===
Team	Pld	W	D	L	GF	GA	GD	Pts
Al Urooba	4	2	2	0	8	3	+5	8
Dibba Al Fujairah	4	2	2	0	8	5	+3	8
Masfout	4	1	3	0	5	4	+1	6
Al Dhaid	4	0	2	2	3	8	−5	2
Masafi	4	0	1	3	5	9	−4	1

Source: soccerway

== Bracket ==
Round of 16
Shabab Al Ahli	3
Hatta	0
Emirates (a.e.t.)	1
Kalba	0
Baniyas	2
Al Urooba	0
Fujairah	0
Al Wasl	1
Al Dhafra	1
Al Jazira	0
Khor Fakkan	0
Sharjah	2
Al Wahda	0 (2)
Al Nasr (p)	0 (4)
Al Ain	0
Ajman	1

Quarter-finals
Shabab Al Ahli	2
Emirates	0
Baniyas	1
Al Wasl	0
Al Dhafra	0
Sharjah	4
Al Nasr	2
Ajman	0

Semi-finals
Shabab Al Ahli	1
Baniyas	0
Sharjah	0
Al Nasr	3

Final
Shabab Al Ahli	2
Al Nasr	1

== Knockout stage ==
The knockout stage was played between the UAE Pro League teams and two teams from the preliminary round, Emirates and Al Urooba as they both won their respective groups.

=== Round of 16 ===
All times are local (UTC+04:00)

5 December 2020	Khor Fakkan	0–2	Sharjah	Khor Fakkan
16:35		Report	Luanzinho 11'; Welliton 21'	Stadium: Saqr bin Mohammad al Qassimi Stadium

5 December 2020	Al Ain	0–1	Ajman	Al Ain
16:45		Report	Owusu 44'	Stadium: Hazza bin Zayed Stadium

5 December 2020	Al Wahda	0–0 (2–4 p)	Al Nasr	Al Nahyan, Abu Dhabi
19:45		Report		Stadium: Al Nahyan Stadium
	Penalties
	Juma (penalty scored); Pimenta (penalty scored); Luvannor (penalty missed); Esmaeel (penalty missed)		(penalty scored) Tozé; (penalty scored) Tagliabúe; (penalty scored) Saba; (penalty scored) Al Fardan

5 December 2020	Fujairah	0–1	Al Wasl	Fujairah
19:45		Report	Figueiredo 50'	Stadium: Fujairah Club Stadium

6 December 2020	Emirates	1–0 (a.e.t.)	Kalba	Ras Al Khaimah
16:40	Al-Hammadi 107'	Report		Stadium: Emirates Club Stadium

6 December 2020	Baniyas	2–0	Al Urooba	Al Shamkha, Abu Dhabi
16:45	Abunamous 71', 78'	Report		Stadium: Baniyas Stadium

6 December 2020	Shabab Al Ahli	3–0	Hatta	Deira, Dubai
19:45	Jesus 52'; Al-Bloushi 71'; Jumaa 73'	Report		Stadium: Rashid Stadium

6 December 2020	Al Dhafra	1–0	Al Jazira	Madinat Zayed
19:45	Denílson 21'	Report		Stadium: Al Dhafra Stadium

=== Quarter-finals ===
Emirates was the only UAE First Division League team to participate in this round.

21 December 2020	Baniyas	1–0	Al Wasl	Al Shamkha, Abu Dhabi
16:50	Abunamous 84'	Report		Stadium: Baniyas Stadium

21 December 2020	Al Dhafra	0–4	Sharjah	Madinat Zayed
19:45		Report	Welliton 2'; Coronado 58', 90+1'; Caio 87'	Stadium: Al Dhafra Stadium

22 December 2020	Shabab Al Ahli	2–0	Emirates	Deira, Dubai
16:45	Jumaa 43'; Jesus 77'	Report		Stadium: Al-Rashid Stadium

22 December 2020	Al Nasr	2–0	Ajman	Al Nasr, Dubai
19:45	Saba 47'; Tagliabúe 87'	Report		Stadium: Al Maktoum Stadium

=== Semi-finals ===
The semi-finals were held in neutral stadiums.

22 February 2021	Shabab Al Ahli	1–0	Baniyas	Sharjah
17:30	Jesus 73'	Report		Stadium: Sharjah Stadium

22 February 2021	Sharjah	0–3	Al Nasr	Deira, Dubai
20:30		Report	Tozé 36'; Abeid 41'; Tagliabúe 88'	Stadium: Rashid Stadium

=== Final ===
16 May 2021	Shabab Al Ahli	2–1	Al Nasr	Al Ain
19:35	Cartabia 42', 90+3' (pen.)	Report	Abeid 82'	Stadium: Hazza bin Zayed Stadium; Attendance: 3,800
