= Ahmed Abunamous =

Emirati footballer (born 1999)

Personal information
- Full name: Ahmed Shehda Abunamous
- Date of birth: 5 October 1999 (age 27)
- Place of birth: United Arab Emirates
- Height: 1.79 m (5 ft 10 in)
- Positions: Winger; left-back

Team information
- Current team: Kalba
- Number: 42

Senior career*
Years	Team	Apps	(Gls)
2018–2024	Baniyas	108	(11)
2024–	Kalba	0	(0)
- * Club domestic league appearances and goals as of 4 November 2023

Ahmed Shehda Abunamous (Arabic: احمد شحذة أبو ناموس; born 5 October 1999) is an Emirati footballer who plays as a winger or a light-back for Kalba.

== Club career ==
In the 2020–21 season, he scored his goal with a solo effort after dribbling past four defenders in the 80th minute on 17 December 2020, coming on as a substitute in the 77th minute, in a 1–0 home win against champions Sharjah.

== Career statistics ==
=== Club ===
As of 4 November 2023

Club	Season	League			Cup		Continental		Other		Total	
Club	Season	Division	Apps	Goals	Apps	Goals	Apps	Goals	Apps	Goals	Apps	Goals
Baniyas	2018–19	UAE Pro League	8	3	0	0	—		0	0	8	3
Baniyas	2019–20	UAE Pro League	9	0	3 (Note: Includes appearances in the UAE League Cup)	0	—		0	0	12	0
Baniyas	2020–21	UAE Pro League	25	4	5	3	—		0	0	30	7
Baniyas	2021–22	UAE Pro League	18	2	8	3	1	0	0	0	27	5
Baniyas	2022–23	UAE Pro League	24	1	2	0	—		0	0	26	1
Baniyas	2023–24	UAE Pro League	7	1	2	0	—		0	0	9	1
Career total			91	11	20	7	1	0	0	0	112	18
