= Khalifa Al Hammadi =

Emirati footballer (born 1998)

Khalifa Al-Hammadi
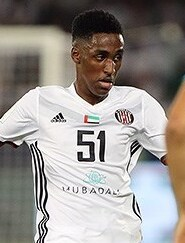
- Al-Hammadi with Al Jazira facing Real Madrid in the 2017 FIFA Club World Cup

Personal information
- Full name: Khalifa Mubarak Khalfan Khairi Al-Hammadi
- Date of birth: 7 November 1998 (age 28)
- Place of birth: Abu Dhabi, United Arab Emirates
- Height: 1.78 m (5 ft 10 in)
- Position: Centre-back

Team information
- Current team: Al Jazira
- Number: 5

Youth career
- –2017: Al Jazira

Senior career*
Years	Team	Apps	(Gls)
2017–	Al Jazira	114	(6)

International career^{‡}
2018–2022	United Arab Emirates U23	11	(3)
2019–	United Arab Emirates	52	(3)
- * Club domestic league appearances and goals as of 06:33, 30 December 2018 (UTC) ‡ National team caps and goals as of 21:10, 13 November 2026 (UTC)

Khalifa Mubarak Al-Hammadi (Arabic: خَلِيْفَة مُبَارَك خَلفَان خَيْرِيّ الْحَمَّادِيّ; born 7 November 1998) is an Emirati professional footballer who plays as a centre-back for UAE Pro League club Al Jazira and the United Arab Emirates national team.

== Club career ==
Al Hammadi made his professional debut for Al Jazira in the UAE Pro League on 30 November 2017, starting against Sharjah before being substituted out for Ahmed Rabee in the 63rd minute with the match finishing as a 2–1 away win.

== International career ==
Al Hammadi was included in United Arab Emirates' squad for the 2019 AFC Asian Cup hosted on home soil.

On 4 January 2024, he was named in the UAE's squad for the 2023 AFC Asian Cup. He scored a stoppage-time equaliser in their round of 16 match against Tajikistan to tie the game 1–1, though his nation would end up being knocked out on penalties.

== Career statistics ==
=== International ===
As of 13 November 2026

Appearances and goals by national team and year
National team	Year	Apps	Goals
United Arab Emirates	2019	8	0
United Arab Emirates	2020	2	0
United Arab Emirates	2021	4	0
United Arab Emirates	2022	9	0
United Arab Emirates	2023	11	1
United Arab Emirates	2024	15	1
United Arab Emirates	2025	1	0
United Arab Emirates	2026	2	1
Total		52	3

Scores and results list the United Arab Emirates' goal tally first.

List of international goals scored by Khalifa Al Hammadi
No.	Date	Venue	Opponent	Score	Result	Competition
1	16 November 2023	Al Maktoum Stadium, Dubai, United Arab Emirates	Nepal	1–0	4–0	2026 FIFA World Cup qualification
2	28 January 2024	Ahmad bin Ali Stadium, Al Rayyan, Qatar	Tajikistan	1–1	1–1 (3–5 p)	2023 AFC Asian Cup
3	13 November 2026	Mohammed bin Zayed Stadium, Abu Dhabi, United Arab Emirates	Honduras	1–0	3–1	Friendly

== Honours ==
Al Jazira

- UAE Pro League: 2020–21
- UAE Super Cup: 2021
