= Ali Saleh (footballer) =

Emirati footballer (born 2000)

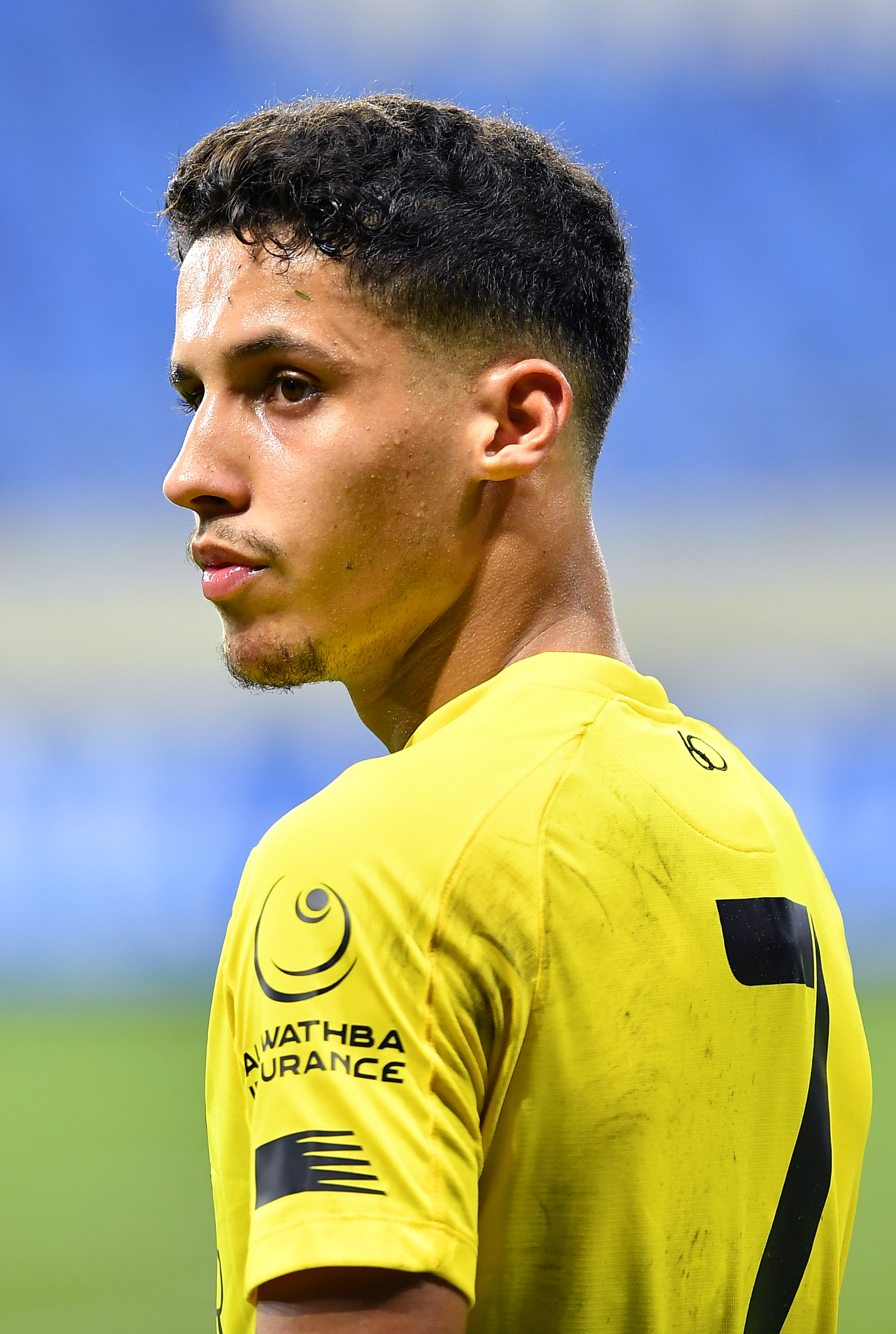
- Saleh with Al-Wasl in 2019

Personal information
- Full name: Ali Saleh Ali Saleh Amro
- Date of birth: 22 January 2000 (age 26)
- Place of birth: Dubai, United Arab Emirates
- Height: 1.76 m (5 ft 9 in)
- Positions: Winger; forward

Team information
- Current team: Al-Wasl
- Number: 7

Youth career
- 2006–2016: Al-Wasl

Senior career*
Years	Team	Apps	(Gls)
2016–	Al-Wasl	178	(40)

International career^{‡}
2018	United Arab Emirates U19	3	(3)
2019–	United Arab Emirates	60	(8)
- * Club domestic league appearances and goals as of 01:12, 23 May 2024 (UTC) ‡ National team caps and goals as of 16:36, 17 November 2026 (UTC)

Ali Saleh Amro (born 22 January 2000), or simply Ali Saleh (Arabic: عَلِيّ صَالِح عَلِيّ صَالِح عَمْرُو), is an Emirati professional footballer who plays for Emirati club Al-Wasl and the United Arab Emirates national team.

== International career ==
On 4 January 2024, Saleh was named in the UAE's squad for the 2023 AFC Asian Cup.

== Personal life ==
He was born in Dubai, with a Scottish mother and an Emirati father, accrediting his family as the driving force for his football passion. He is a fan of Manchester United and stated that he would love to play in the English Premier League one day, having taken a week training in the boot camp of the club and posting photo with fellow Scottish manager Alex Ferguson.

== Career statistics ==
=== Club ===
As of 23 May 2024

Club	Season	League			National Cup (Note: Includes the UAE League Cup)		Continental		Other		Total	
Club	Season	Division	Apps	Goals	Apps	Goals	Apps	Goals	Apps	Goals	Apps	Goals
Al-Wasl	2015–16	UPL	4	0	0	0	—		0	0	4	0
Al-Wasl	2016–17	UPL	1	1	1	0	—		0	0	2	1
Al-Wasl	2017–18	UPL	11	1	2	0	5 (Note: Appearances in the AFC Champions League)	0	0	0	18	1
Al-Wasl	2018–19	UPL	17	5	2	1	5	0	1 (Note: Appearance in the Arab Club Champions Cup)	1	25	7
Al-Wasl	2019–20	UPL	17	1	1	0	—		0	0	18	1
Al-Wasl	2020–21	UPL	22	4	3	0	—		0	0	25	4
Al-Wasl	2021–22	UPL	23	9	5	0	—		0	0	28	9
Al-Wasl	2022–23	UPL	26	4	6	1	0	0	0	0	32	5
Al-Wasl	2023–24	UPL	21	7	4	4	0	0	5	1	30	12
Career total			142	32	26	6	10	0	6	2	178	40

=== International ===
As of goal scored 30 September 2026
Scores and results list the United Arab Emirates' goal tally first.

No.	Date	Venue	Opponent	Score	Result	Competition
1	31 August 2019	Bahrain National Stadium, Riffa, Bahrain	Sri Lanka	5–1	5–1	Friendly
2	12 November 2020	Zabeel Stadium, Dubai, United Arab Emirates	Tajikistan	3–2	3–2	Friendly
3.	30 November 2021	Stadium 974, Doha, Qatar	Syria	2–0	2–1	2021 FIFA Arab Cup
4.	21 March 2024	Al Nahyan Stadium, Abu Dhabi, United Arab Emirates	Yemen	1–0	2–1	2026 FIFA World Cup qualification
5.	6 June 2024	Prince Mohamed bin Fahd Stadium, Dammam, Saudi Arabia	Nepal	3–0	4–0	2026 FIFA World Cup qualification
6.	5 September 2024	Ahmad bin Ali Stadium, Al Rayyan, Qatar	Qatar	3–1	3–1	2026 FIFA World Cup qualification
7.	27 September 2026	Prince Abdullah Al-Faisal Sports City Stadium, Jeddah, Saudi Arabia	Bahrain	3–0	3–0	27th Arabian Gulf Cup
8.	30 September 2026	King Abdullah Sports City Stadium, Jeddah, Saudi Arabia	Qatar	1–1	1–1	27th Arabian Gulf Cup

== Honours ==
Al-Wasl

- UAE Pro League: 2023–24
- UAE President's Cup: 2023–24
- UAE–Qatar Super Shield: 2025
