= Bruno (footballer, born 2001) =

Emirati footballer (born 2001)

Bruno برونو
Personal information
- Full name: Bruno Conceição de Oliveira
- Date of birth: 10 June 2001 (age 25)
- Place of birth: Anchieta, Brazil
- Height: 1.82 m (6 ft 0 in)
- Position: Winger

Team information
- Current team: Al Jazira
- Number: 80

Youth career
- –2018: Rubro Negro-MG
- 2019: Grêmio Novorizontino

Senior career*
Years	Team	Apps	(Gls)
2019–	Al Jazira	67	(6)

International career^{‡}
2024–	United Arab Emirates	25	(3)
- * Club domestic league appearances and goals as of 19:36, 11 December 2023 (UTC) ‡ National team caps and goals as of 21:20, 13 November 2026 (UTC)

Bruno Conceição de Oliveira (Arabic: برونو كونسيساو دي أوليفيرا; born 10 June 2001), commonly known as Bruno, is a footballer who plays as a winger for UAE Pro League club Al Jazira. Born in Brazil, he represents the United Arab Emirates national team.

== Career statistics ==
=== Club ===
As of 11 December 2023.

Club	Season	League			Cup		Continental		Other		Total	
Club	Season	Division	Apps	Goals	Apps	Goals	Apps	Goals	Apps	Goals	Apps	Goals
Al Jazira	2019–20	UPL	6	0	4 (Note: Appearances in the UAE League Cup)	1	—		—		10	1
Al Jazira	2020–21	UPL	17	1	3	1	—		—		20	2
Al Jazira	2021–22	UPL	21	2	5	2	2	0	2 (Note: Appearance in UAE Super Cup) (Note: Appearance in FIFA Club World Cup)	1	30	5
Al Jazira	2022–23	UPL	19	2	8	3	—		—		27	5
Al Jazira	2023–24	UPL	4	1	2	1	—		—		6	2
Career total			67	6	22	8	2	0	2	1	89	15

=== International ===
As of match played 13 November 2026

Appearances and goals by national team and year
National team	Year	Apps	Goals
United Arab Emirates	2024	7	0
United Arab Emirates	2025	12	2
United Arab Emirates	2026	6	1
Total		25	3

As of match played 13 November 2026
United Arab Emirates score listed first, score column indicates score after each Bruno de Oliveira goal

List of international goals scored by Bruno de Oliveira
No.	Date	Venue	Cap	Opponent	Score	Result	Competition
1	3 December 2025	Al Bayt Stadium, Al Khor, Qatar	13	Jordan	1–1	1–2	2025 FIFA Arab Cup
2	12 December 2025	Al Bayt Stadium, Al Khor, Qatar	16	Algeria	1–1	1–1 (a.e.t.) (7–6 p)	2025 FIFA Arab Cup
3	13 November 2026	Mohammed bin Zayed Stadium, Abu Dhabi, United Arab Emirates	25	Honduras	2–0	3–1	Friendly
