= Harib Abdalla =

Emirati footballer (born 2002)

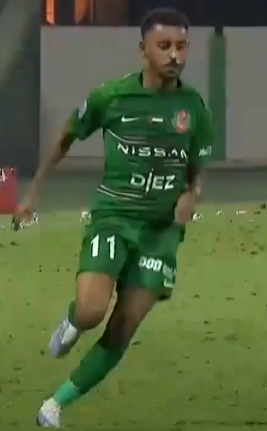
- Abdalla with Shabab Al-Ahli in 2022

Personal information
- Full name: Harib Abdalla Suhail Abdalla Al-Musharrkh Al-Maazmi
- Date of birth: 26 November 2002 (age 23)
- Place of birth: Sharjah, United Arab Emirates
- Height: 1.72 m (5 ft 8 in)
- Positions: Winger; attacking midfielder

Team information
- Current team: Sharjah
- Number: 15

Youth career
- –2019: Shabab Al-Ahli

Senior career*
Years	Team	Apps	(Gls)
2019–2025	Shabab Al Ahli	100	(10)
2025–	Sharjah	5	(0)

International career^{‡}
2019–2022	United Arab Emirates U23	2	(0)
2021–	United Arab Emirates	49	(9)
- * Club domestic league appearances and goals as of 24 May 2025 ‡ National team caps and goals as of 17 November 2026

Harib Abdalla Al-Maazmi (Arabic: حَارِبُ عَبْدِ اللهِ سُهَيْلُ عَبْدِ اللهِ المَشْرَخُ المَازِمِيُّ; born 26 November 2002) is an Emirati professional footballer who plays as a winger or an attacking midfielder for Sharjah and the United Arab Emirates national team. He is the son of former footballer, Abdullah Suhail.

== International career ==
On 4 January 2024, Abdalla was named in the UAE's squad for the 2023 AFC Asian Cup.

== Career statistics ==
=== Club ===
As of 30 December 2023

Club	Season	League			Cup		Continental		Other		Total	
Club	Season	Division	Apps	Goals	Apps	Goals	Apps	Goals	Apps	Goals	Apps	Goals
Shabab Al Ahli	2019–20	UPL	6	1	0	0	6	1	3	0	15	2
Shabab Al Ahli	2020–21	UPL	6	2	0	0	5	1	0	0	11	3
Shabab Al Ahli	2021–22	UPL	17	0	0	0	7	1	6	0	30	1
Shabab Al Ahli	2022–23	UPL	24	2	2	0	0	0	2	0	28	2
Shabab Al Ahli	2023–24	UPL	11	3	0	0	1	0	3	1	15	4
Shabab Al Ahli	Total		64	8	2	0	19	3	14	1	99	12
Career totals			64	8	2	0	19	3	14	1	99	12

=== International ===
No.	Date	Venue	Opponent	Score	Result	Competition
1.	29 March 2022	Al Maktoum Stadium, Dubai, United Arab Emirates	South Korea	1–0	1–0	2022 FIFA World Cup qualification
2.	28 March 2023	Al Nahyan Stadium, Abu Dhabi, United Arab Emirates	Thailand	1–0	2–0	Friendly
3.	6 June 2024	Prince Mohamed bin Fahd Stadium, Dammam, Saudi Arabia	Nepal	1–0	4–0	2026 FIFA World Cup qualification
4.	6 June 2024	Prince Mohamed bin Fahd Stadium, Dammam, Saudi Arabia	Nepal	2–0	4–0	2026 FIFA World Cup qualification
5.	5 September 2024	Ahmad bin Ali Stadium, Al Rayyan, Qatar	Qatar	1–1	3–1	2026 FIFA World Cup qualification
6.	14 November 2024	Mohammed bin Zayed Stadium, Abu Dhabi, United Arab Emirates	Kyrgyzstan	1–0	3–0	2026 FIFA World Cup qualification
7.	14 November 2024	Mohammed bin Zayed Stadium, Abu Dhabi, United Arab Emirates	Kyrgyzstan	3–0	3–0	2026 FIFA World Cup qualification
8.	10 June 2025	Dolen Omurzakov Stadium, Bishkek, Kyrgyzstan	Kyrgyzstan	1–0	1–1	2026 FIFA World Cup qualification
9.	17 November 2026	Hazza bin Zayed Stadium, Al Ain, United Arab Emirates	Syria	2–1	4–2	Friendly
