= Bader Nasser (Emirati footballer) =

Emirati footballer (born 2001)

Personal information
- Birth name: Bader Nasser Abdelaziz Mohammad
- Date of birth: 16 September 2001 (age 25)
- Place of birth: Dubai, United Arab Emirates
- Height: 1.79 m (5 ft 10 1/2 in)
- Position: Left-back

Team information
- Current team: Al-Wahda (on loan from Shabab Al Ahli)
- Number: 60

Youth career
- Shabab Al Ahli

Senior career*
| Years | Team | Apps | (Gls) |
| 2020– | Shabab Al Ahli | 48 | (0) |
| 2025– | → Al-Wahda (loan) | 8 | (0) |

International career^{‡}
| 2022– | United Arab Emirates | 14 | (0) |
- * Club domestic league appearances and goals as of 16 March 2026 ‡ National team caps and goals as of 14:43, 5 August 2024 (UTC)

Bader Nasser Abdelaziz Mohammad (Arabic: بَدْر نَاصِر عَبْد الْعَزِيز مُحَمَّد; born 16 September 2001) is an Emirati professional footballer who plays as a left-back for UAE Pro League club Al-Wahda, on loan from Shabab Al Ahli and the United Arab Emirates national team.

== Club career ==
Nasser is a youth product of Shabab Al Ahli, and helped their under-18 side win the youth championship in 2019. He began his senior career with the UAE Pro League Shabab Al Ahli in 2020. His first trophy with the club was the 2020 UAE Super Cup, and the following season won the 2020–21 UAE President's Cup and the 2020–21 UAE League Cup. On 11 August 2021, he extended his contract with the club until 2026. He also won the 2022–23 UAE Pro League and following 2023 UAE Super Cup, although an injury to his cruciate ligament on cruciate ligament ended his season early.

== International career ==
Nasser debuted for the United Arab Emirates national team in a 1–0 friendly win over Lebanon on 30 December 2022. He made the final squad for the 25th Arabian Gulf Cup. He was called up to the national team for the 2023 AFC Asian Cup.

== Personal life ==
Nasser is a fan of the sport padel. He graduated from the University of Sharjah in 2023.

== Honours ==
Shabab Al Ahli

- UAE Pro League: 2022–23
- UAE President's Cup: 2020–21
- UAE League Cup: 2020–21
- UAE Super Cup: 2020, 2023
