= Mohammed Jumaa =

Emirati footballer (born 1997)

Personal information
- Full name: Mohammed Jumaa Eid Gharib Jumaa Al-Balooshi
- Date of birth: 28 January 1997 (age 29)
- Place of birth: Dubai, United Arab Emirates
- Height: 1.69 m (5 ft 7 in)
- Position: Winger

Team information
- Current team: Al Bataeh
- Number: 10

Youth career
- Al Shabab

Senior career*
Years	Team	Apps	(Gls)
2015–2017	Al Shabab	37	(5)
2017–2024	Shabab Al-Ahli	55	(8)
2024	→ Al Bataeh (loan)	12	(1)
2024–	Al Bataeh	0	(0)

International career
2021–	United Arab Emirates	9	(1)
- * Club domestic league appearances and goals as of 7 June 2021

Mohammed Jumaa Eid Gharib Jumaa Al-Balooshi (Arabic: مُحَمَّد جُمْعَة عِيد غَرِيب جُمْعَة الْبَلُوشِيّ) (born 28 January 1997) is an Emirati footballer who plays for Al Bataeh.

== International career ==
=== International goals ===
Scores and results list the United Arab Emirates' goal tally first.

No.	Date	Venue	Opponent	Score	Result	Competition
1.	7 June 2021	Zabeel Stadium, Dubai, United Arab Emirates	Thailand	3–1	3–1	2022 FIFA World Cup qualification
