= Yahya Al-Ghassani =

Emirati footballer (born 1998)

Personal information
- Full name: Yahya Ali Saeed Al-Ghassani
- Date of birth: 17 April 1998 (age 28)
- Place of birth: Sharjah, United Arab Emirates
- Height: 1.75 m (5 ft 9 in)
- Position: Winger

Team information
- Current team: Shabab Al Ahli
- Number: 11

Youth career
- Al Ahli
- Al Wahda

Senior career*
Years	Team	Apps	(Gls)
2018–2021	Al Wahda	34	(4)
2021–	Shabab Al Ahli	89	(17)
2026–	→ Sharjah (loan)	0	(0)

International career^{‡}
2020	United Arab Emirates U23	3	(0)
2022–	United Arab Emirates	41	(12)
- * Club domestic league appearances and goals as of 3 October 2026 ‡ National team caps and goals as of 18 December 2025

Yahya Ali Saeed Al-Ghassani (Arabic: يَحْيَى عَلِيّ سَعِيد الْغَسَّانِيّ; born 17 April 1998) is an Emirati professional footballer who plays as a winger for UAE Pro League club Shabab Al Ahli and the United Arab Emirates national team.

== Early life ==
Al-Ghassani was born in Sharjah, United Arab Emirates to an Emirati mother, and an Omani-Tanzanian father.

== Club career ==
Al Ghassani played with Al Ahli and Al Wahda at youth level. He signed a four-year contract with Al Wahda in 2018 to participate in the UAE Pro League. On 4 January 2021, he left Al Wahda and signed for Shabab Al Ahli on a three-year contract.

== International career ==
Al Ghassani participated at the 2020 AFC U-23 Championship with the United Arab Emirates Olympic team.

On 4 January 2024, Al Ghassani was named in the UAE's squad for the 2023 AFC Asian Cup. He scored in the UAE's opening match of the tournament – a 3–1 win over Hong Kong on 14 January.

== Career statistics ==
=== Club ===
As of 28 December 2024.

Appearances and goals by club, season and competition
Club	Season	League			National cup		Continental		Other		Total	
Club	Season	Division	Apps	Goals	Apps	Goals	Apps	Goals	Apps	Goals	Apps	Goals
Al Wahda	2018–19	UPL	11	2	1	0	1	0	7	2	20	4
Al Wahda	2019–20	UPL	16	1	1	0	2	0	4	2	23	3
Al Wahda	2020–21	UPL	7	1	0	0	0	0	1	0	8	1
Al Wahda	Total		34	4	2	0	3	0	12	4	51	8
Shabab Al Ahli	2020–21	UPL	10	3	1	0	4	0	5	0	20	3
Shabab Al Ahli	2021–22	UPL	17	2	2	0	6	1	5	0	30	3
Shabab Al Ahli	2022–23	UPL	23	7	2	0	1	0	2	1	28	8
Shabab Al Ahli	2023–24	UPL	24	5	2	1	2	2	3	1	31	9
Shabab Al Ahli	2024–25	UPL	4	0	0	0	5	2	2	1	11	3
Shabab Al Ahli	Total		78	17	7	1	18	5	17	3	120	26
Career total			112	21	9	1	21	5	29	7	171	34

=== International ===
Scores and results list the United Arab Emirates' goal tally first, score column indicates score after each Al Ghassani goal.

List of international goals scored by Yahya Al Ghassani
No.	Date	Venue	Opponent	Score	Result	Competition
1	27 January 2022	Al Maktoum Stadium, Dubai, United Arab Emirates	Syria	2–0	2–0	2022 FIFA World Cup qualification
2	12 September 2023	Maksimir Stadium, Zagreb, Croatia	Costa Rica	1–0	4–1	Friendly
3	12 September 2023	Maksimir Stadium, Zagreb, Croatia	Costa Rica	4–0	4–1	Friendly
4	14 January 2024	Khalifa International Stadium, Al Rayyan, Qatar	Hong Kong	3–1	3–1	2023 AFC Asian Cup
5	23 January 2024	Ahmad bin Ali Stadium, Al Rayyan, Qatar	Iran	1–2	1–2	2023 AFC Asian Cup
6	10 October 2024	Hazza bin Zayed Stadium, Al Ain, United Arab Emirates	North Korea	1–0	1–1	2026 FIFA World Cup qualification
7	19 November 2024	Al Nahyan Stadium, Abu Dhabi, United Arab Emirates	Qatar	5–0	5–0	2026 FIFA World Cup qualification
8	21 December 2024	Sulaibikhat Stadium, Sulaibikhat, Kuwait	Qatar	1–1	1–1	26th Arabian Gulf Cup
9	27 December 2024	Sulaibikhat Stadium, Sulaibikhat, Kuwait	Oman	1–0	1–1	26th Arabian Gulf Cup
10	4 September 2025	Zabeel Stadium, Dubai, United Arab Emirates	Syria	2–1	3–1	Friendly
11	9 December 2025	Stadium 974, Doha, Qatar	Kuwait	1–0	3–1	2025 FIFA Arab Cup
12	9 December 2025	Stadium 974, Doha, Qatar	Kuwait	2–0	3–1	2025 FIFA Arab Cup

== Honours ==
Al Wahda

- UAE Super Cup: 2018

Shabab Al Ahli

- UAE Pro League: 2022–23, 2024–25
- UAE President's Cup: 2020–21
- UAE League Cup: 2020–21
- UAE Super Cup: 2020, 2023, 2024
