= Abdullah Ramadan (footballer) =

Emirati footballer (born 1998)

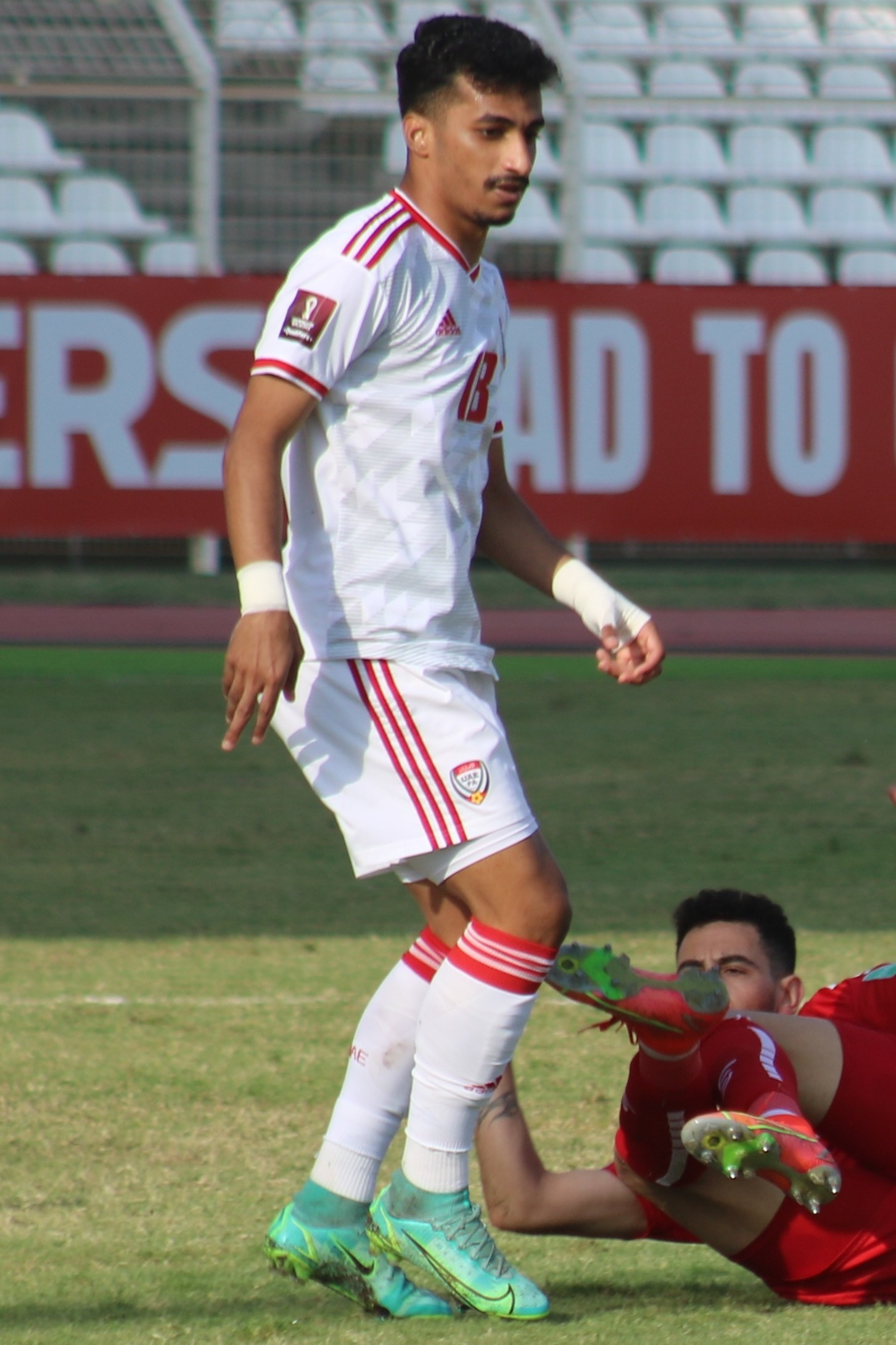
- Ramadan with the United Arab Emirates in 2021

Personal information
- Full name: Abdullah Ramadan Bakheet Soliman Bakheet Al-Ameri
- Date of birth: 7 March 1998 (age 28)
- Place of birth: Abu Dhabi, United Arab Emirates
- Height: 1.72 m (5 ft 8 in)
- Positions: Left winger; midfielder

Team information
- Current team: Al Jazira
- Number: 7

Youth career
- 2008–2018: Al Jazira

Senior career*
Years	Team	Apps	(Gls)
2018–	Al Jazira	132	(15)

International career
2019–2021	United Arab Emirates U23	4	(0)
2019–	United Arab Emirates	57	(2)
- * Club domestic league appearances and goals

Abdalla Ramadan Bekheet (Arabic: عَبدُ اللهِ رَمَضانُ بَخِيتٍ سُلَيْمانُ بَخِيتٍ العَامِرِيُّ; born 11 September 1998) is an Emirati professional footballer who plays for Al Jazira.

== International career ==
Born in the United Arab Emirates, Ramadan is of Egyptian descent. He played with Al Jazira in juniors and participated in the first team in 2018 after allowing the born in United Arab Emirates to participate in the UAE Pro League. He was granted Emirati citizenship in 2018 and was chosen to participate with the first team in 24th Arabian Gulf Cup and was chosen to participate with the Olympic team to participate in 2020 AFC U-23 Championship.

On 4 January 2024, he was named in the UAE's squad for the 2023 AFC Asian Cup.
