= Education City Stadium =

Association football stadium in Al Rayyan, Qatar

- استاد المدينة التعليمية (Arabic)
- Interior view of the stadium before the 2022 FIFA World Cup Group H match between South Korea and Portugal.
- Interactive map of Education City Stadium
- Full name: Education City Stadium
- Location: Education City, Al Rayyan, Qatar
- Coordinates: 25°18′39″N 51°25′28″E
- Owner: Qatar Foundation
- Capacity: 44,667
- Surface: Grass
- Record attendance: 44,667 (Morocco vs Spain, 6 December 2022)
- Public transit: Education City (المدينة التعليمية)

Construction
- Groundbreaking: 2016
- Opened: 15 June 2020
- Architects: Fenwick Iribarren Architects; Pattern Design
- Project manager: ASTAD
- Structural engineers: Arup; Buro Happold
- Main contractors: Conspel Qatar; Joannou & Paraskevaides

Tenant
- Qatar national football team (selected matches)

Education City Stadium in partnership with QNB (Arabic: إِسْتَاد المدينة التعليمية, romanized: ʾIstād al-Madīna at-Taʿlīmiyya) is a football stadium which is located in Al Rayyan, Qatar, and was built as a venue in time for the 2022 FIFA World Cup held in Qatar. The stadium is located within several university campuses at the Qatar Foundation's Education City. Following the FIFA World Cup, the stadium will retain 25,000 seats for use by university athletic teams. On 3 September 2020, the stadium hosted its first official match, played in the 2020–21 Qatar Stars League season.

The stadium is located about 7 km (4.3 mi) north-west of Doha.

== Construction ==
The stadium is located on the outskirts of the capital Doha and has a capacity of 40,000 seats. It has been given the nickname "Diamond in the Desert". With 20 percent of its building materials identified as green, the stadium is among the world's most environmentally sustainable stadiums. In May 2019, Education City Stadium in partnership with QNB received a five-star GSAS rating.

The build contractor is JPAC JV, who appointed Pattern Design as the lead design architect, and Buro Happold for the engineering design.

On 15 March 2022, FIFA president Gianni Infantino met with Qatar Minister of Labor, Ali bin Samikh Al Marri in Doha, and discussed the labor reforms taking place in the country. On 16 March 2022 Infantino said in an interview, “I am pleased to see the strong commitment from the Qatari authorities to ensure the reforms are fully implemented across the labor market, leaving a lasting legacy of the FIFA World Cup long after the event, and benefiting migrant workers in the host country in the long term.”

On November 1, 2022, the International Labor Organization (ILO) recognized that Qatar has “undertaken comprehensive labor reforms to improve the conditions of the hundreds of thousands of migrant workers” which have “yielded benefits for workers, employers, and the economy more broadly.” This builds upon their 2021 report that detailed the positive impact of Qatar's new labor legislation and implementation mechanisms. Also, On November 23, 2022, Foreign Policy (an American media house) drafted a report on the latest acknowledgement of the labor reforms that Qatar initiated, as the nation has already been scrutinized for its treatment of migrant workers in the past. Reforms include the introduction of a nondiscriminatory minimum wage, the removal of barriers to change jobs, and the introduction of a worker compensation fund in 2018 that has paid out $350 million so far.

=== 2022 FIFA World Cup ===
The Education City Stadium in partnership with QNB was one of eight stadiums built, renovated or reconstructed for the 2022 FIFA World Cup Qatar. The construction of the stadium was completed in June 2020, making it the third World Cup stadium to be completed. It officially opened on 15 June 2020.

== History ==
Aerial view of Education City Stadium in partnership with QNB

Construction began in 2016.

On 30 September 2019, FIFA announced the Education City Stadium in partnership with QNB as the host of the third place match and final of the 2019 FIFA Club World Cup, with the tournament being held in Qatar. The stadium would also have hosted Liverpool’s first match in the semi-finals, but on 7 December 2019, the official opening of Education City Stadium in partnership with QNB was postponed until early 2020. Thus, Liverpool's opener, the final, and the third place match were all moved to the Khalifa International Stadium, also in Al Rayyan.

The 2020 FIFA Club World Cup was once again held in Qatar. The Education City Stadium in partnership with QNB was one of the venues. One second round match, one semi-final match, the third place match and the final between Bayern Munich and UANL all took place in the stadium. In 2020 the Education City Stadium in partnership with QNB hosted the East and West Zone matches of the 2020 AFC Champions League.

The stadium hosted five matches of the 2021 FIFA Arab Cup.

== Recent tournament results ==
=== 2021 FIFA Arab Cup ===
Date	Time	Team #1	Result	Team #2	Round	Attendance
1 December 2021	22:00	Saudi Arabia	0–1	Jordan	Group C	4,777
3 December 2021	16:00	Oman	1–2	Qatar	Group A	23,254
4 December 2021	22:00	Palestine	1–1	Saudi Arabia	Group C	3,075
7 December 2021	22:00	Lebanon	1–0	Sudan	Group D	5,991
10 December 2021	18:00	Tunisia	2–1	Oman	Quarter-finals	21,329

=== 2022 FIFA World Cup ===
The Education City Stadium in partnership with QNB hosted eight matches during the 2022 FIFA World Cup.

Date	Time	Team No. 1	Result	Team No. 2	Round	Attendance
22 November 2022	16:00	Denmark	0–0	Tunisia	Group D	42,925
24 November 2022	16:00	Uruguay	0–0	South Korea	Group H	41,663
26 November 2022	16:00	Poland	2–0	Saudi Arabia	Group C	44,259
28 November 2022	16:00	South Korea	2–3	Ghana	Group H	43,983
30 November 2022	18:00	Tunisia	1–0	France	Group D	43,627
2 December 2022	18:00	South Korea	2–1	Portugal	Group H	44,097
6 December 2022	18:00	Morocco	0–0 (a.e.t.) (3–0 p)	Spain	Round of 16	44,667
9 December 2022	18:00	Croatia	1–1 (a.e.t.) (4–2 p)	Brazil	Quarter-finals	43,893

=== 2023 AFC Asian Cup ===
On 5 April 2023, the Education City Stadium in partnership with QNB was chosen as one of eight (later nine) venues for the 2023 AFC Asian Cup.

Date	Time	Team No. 1	Result	Team No. 2	Round	Attendance
14 January 2024	20:30	Iran	4–1	Palestine	Group C	27,691
19 January 2024	14:30	Iraq	2–1	Japan	Group D	38,663
23 January 2024	18:00	Iran	2–1	United Arab Emirates	Group C	34,259
25 January 2024	18:00	Saudi Arabia	0–0	Thailand	Group F	38,773
30 January 2024	19:00	Saudi Arabia	1–1 (a.e.t.) (2–4 p)	South Korea	Round of 16	42,389
3 February 2024	14:30	Iran	2–1	Japan	Quarter-finals	35,640

=== 2025 FIFA Arab Cup ===
Date	Time	Team #1	Result	Team #2	Round	Attendance
2 December 2025	20:00	Saudi Arabia	2–1	Oman	Group B	21,628
5 December 2025	17:30	Oman	0–0	Morocco	Group B	37,996
7 December 2025	20:00	Syria	0–0	Palestine	Group A	39,571
9 December 2025	20:00	Bahrain	3–1	Sudan	Group D	21,386
12 December 2025	17:30	Jordan	1–0	Iraq	Quarter-finals	43,486
