= Abdulla Idrees =

Emirati football player (born 1999)

Abdulla Idrees عَبْد الله إِدْرِيس
Personal information
- Full name: Abdulla Idrees
- Date of birth: 16 August 1999 (age 27)
- Place of birth: Ruwais, United Arab Emirates
- Height: 1.73 m (5 ft 8 in)
- Position: Left back

Team information
- Current team: Al-Dhafra (on loan from Al Nasr)
- Number: 27

Youth career
- –2018: Al Jazira

Senior career*
Years	Team	Apps	(Gls)
2018–2025	Al Jazira	86	(2)
2025	→ Al Nasr (loan)	10	(0)
2025–	Al Nasr	4	(0)
2026–	→ Al-Dhafra (loan)	0	(0)

International career
2021–2022	United Arab Emirates U23	5	(1)
2022–	United Arab Emirates	19	(0)
- * Club domestic league appearances and goals as of 8 April 2026

Abdulla Idrees (Arabic:عَبْد الله إِدْرِيس; born 16 August 1999) is an Emirati football player who plays for Al-Dhafra, on loan from Al Nasr, and the United Arab Emirates national football team.

== Club career ==
Abdulla Idrees started his career at Al-Jazira and is a product of the Al-Jazira's youth system. On 7 April 2018, Abdulla Idrees made his professional debut for Al Jazira against Emirates Club in the Pro League. During the winter transfer window Idrees would sign for Al Nasr.

== International career ==
On 4 January 2024, Idrees was named in the UAE's squad for the 2023 AFC Asian Cup.
