= Zayed Sultan =

Emirati association football player (born 2001)

Zayed Sultan زَايِد سُلْطَان
Personal information
- Full name: Zayed Sultan Ahmed Jassim Ibrahim Al-Zaabi
- Date of birth: 11 April 2001 (age 25)
- Place of birth: Abu Dhabi, United Arab Emirates
- Height: 1.75 m (5 ft 9 in)
- Position: Right back

Team information
- Current team: Al-Nasr
- Number: 24

Youth career
- Al Jazira

Senior career*
Years	Team	Apps	(Gls)
2020–2025	Al Jazira	88	(3)
2025–	Al-Nasr	2	(0)

International career^{‡}
2022–	United Arab Emirates U23	6	(0)
2023–	United Arab Emirates	11	(1)
- * Club domestic league appearances and goals as of 14:45, 5 August 2024 (UTC) ‡ National team caps and goals as of 14:45, 5 August 2024 (UTC)

Zayed Sultan Ahmed Jassim Ibrahim Al-Zaabi (Arabic: زَايِد سُلْطَان أَحْمَد جَاسِم إِبْرَاهِيم الزَّعَابِيّ; born 11 April 2001) is an Emirati professional footballer who plays as a right back for UAE Pro League side Al-Nasr and the United Arab Emirates national team.

== International career ==
On 4 January 2024, Sultan was named in the UAE's squad for the 2023 AFC Asian Cup. He scored in the UAE's opening match of the tournament – a 3–1 win over Hong Kong on 14 January.

== Career statistics ==
=== Club ===
As of 30 December 2020.

Club	Season	League			Cup		Continental		Other		Total	
Club	Season	Division	Apps	Goals	Apps	Goals	Apps	Goals	Apps	Goals	Apps	Goals
Al Jazira	2020–21	UAE Pro League	1	0	2	0	—		—		3	0
Career totals			1	0	2	0	0	0	0	0	3	0

=== International ===
No.	Date	Venue	Opponent	Score	Result	Competition
1.	14 January 2024	Khalifa International Stadium, Al Rayyan, Qatar	Hong Kong	2–1	3–1	2023 AFC Asian Cup
