= Sultan Adil =

Emirati footballer (born 2004)

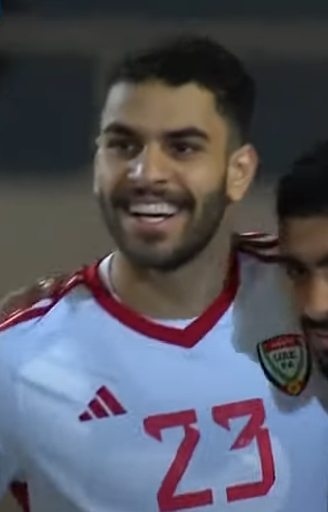
- Adil in 2024

Personal information
- Full name: Sultan Adil Mohamed Abdalla Al-Amiri
- Date of birth: 4 May 2004 (age 22)
- Place of birth: Kalba, United Arab Emirates
- Height: 1.87 m (6 ft 2 in)
- Position: Striker

Team information
- Current team: Shabab Al Ahli
- Number: 21

Youth career
- –2021: Ittihad Kalba

Senior career*
Years	Team	Apps	(Gls)
2021–2023	Ittihad Kalba	34	(4)
2023–	Shabab Al Ahli	2	(1)
2023–2024	→ Ittihad Kalba (loan)	20	(0)

International career^{‡}
2022–2023	United Arab Emirates U-20		
2022–	United Arab Emirates	24	(8)
- * Club domestic league appearances and goals ‡ National team caps and goals as of 6 October 2026

Sultan Adil Al-Amiri (Arabic: سُلْطَان عَادِل مُحَمَّد عَبْد الله الْأَمِيرِيّ; born 4 May 2004) is an Emirati professional footballer who plays as a striker for Shabab Al Ahli and the United Arab Emirates national team.

== Club career ==
Born in Kalba, Sultan was formed in the Ittihad Kalba academy. He was promoted to the first team in 2021 and made his professional debut on 30 January 2021 against Shabab Al Ahli.

== Personal life ==
The father of Sultan is Adel Mohammed, himself a former footballer who participated with the UAE national team in their 1996 achievement of finishing runners-up in the Asian Cup.

== International career ==
Adil made his debut for United Arab Emirates national team on 24 March 2022, in a 0–1 defeat against Iraq in the 2022 FIFA World Cup qualification. On 17 October 2023, he scored his first international goal against Lebanon in a friendly game.

On 4 January 2024, Adil was named in the UAE's squad for the 2023 AFC Asian Cup. He scored in the UAE's opening match of the tournament – a 3–1 win over Hong Kong on 14 January.

== Career statistics ==
As of 14 October 2025

=== International ===
No.	Date	Venue	Opponent	Score	Result	Competition
1.	17 October 2023	Al Maktoum Stadium, Dubai, United Arab Emirates	Lebanon	2–1	2–1	Friendly
2.	14 January 2024	Khalifa International Stadium, Al Rayyan, Qatar	Hong Kong	1–0	3–1	2023 AFC Asian Cup
3.	18 January 2024	Al Janoub Stadium, Al Wakrah, Qatar	Palestine	1–0	1–1	2023 AFC Asian Cup
4.	21 March 2024	Al Nahyan Stadium, Abu Dhabi, United Arab Emirates	Yemen	2–1	2–1	2026 FIFA World Cup qualification
5.	26 March 2024	Prince Saud bin Jalawi Sports City, Khobar, Saudi Arabia	Yemen	3–0	3–0	2026 FIFA World Cup qualification
6.	11 June 2024	Zabeel Stadium, Dubai, United Arab Emirates	Bahrain	1–1	1–1	2026 FIFA World Cup qualification
7	25 March 2025	Prince Faisal bin Fahd Sports City Stadium, Riyadh, Saudi Arabia	North Korea	2–1	2–1	2026 FIFA World Cup qualification
8	14 October 2025	Jassim bin Hamad Stadium, Al Rayyan, Qatar	Qatar	1–2	1–2	2026 FIFA World Cup qualification
