= Syria national football team results (2020–present) =

This article provides details of international football games played by the Syria national football team from 2020 to present.

== Results ==
Key
Win
Draw
Defeat

=== 2020 ===
12 November 2020 Friendly	Uzbekistan	0–1	Syria	Sharjah, United Arab Emirates
20:00 UTC+4		Report	Al-Mawas 48'	Stadium: Sharjah Stadium; Attendance: 0 Referee: Omar Muhammad Al Ali (United Arab Emirates)

16 November 2020 Friendly	Jordan	1–0	Syria	Sharjah, United Arab Emirates
20:00 UTC+4	Faisal 13'	Report		Stadium: Sharjah Stadium; Attendance: 0 Referee: Omar Muhammad Al Ali (United Arab Emirates)

=== 2021 ===
25 March 2021 Friendly	Bahrain	3–1	Syria	Riffa, Bahrain
16:00 UTC+3	Abdullatif 21' (pen.), 36'; Marhoon 68'	Report	Osman 32' (pen.)	Stadium: Bahrain National Stadium; Attendance: 0 Referee: Khalid Marhoun Al Shaqsi (Oman)

30 March 2021 Friendly	Iran	3–0	Syria	Tehran, Iran
17:30 UTC+4	Kanaanizadegan 2'; Azmoun 38'; Ansarifard 81'	Report		Stadium: Azadi Stadium; Attendance: 0 Referee: Mooud Bonyadifar (Iran)

4 June 2021 2022 World Cup qualification	Maldives	0–4	Syria	Sharjah, United Arab Emirates
20:00 UTC+4		Report	Al-Mawas 29', 45+2' (pen.), 71' (pen.); Aosman 33' (pen.)	Stadium: Sharjah Stadium; Attendance: 0 Referee: Ammar Al-Jeneibi (United Arab Emirates)

7 June 2021 2022 World Cup qualification	Guam	0–3	Syria	Sharjah, United Arab Emirates
18:00 UTC+4		Report	Mardikian 6', 9'; Al-Mawas 84'	Stadium: Sharjah Stadium; Attendance: 0 Referee: Khalid Al-Turais (Saudi Arabia)

15 June 2021 2022 World Cup qualification	China	3–1	Syria	Sharjah, United Arab Emirates
22:00 UTC+4	Zhang Xizhe 43'; Wu Lei 69' (pen.); Zhang Yuning 90+3'	Report	Aosman 50'	Stadium: Sharjah Stadium; Attendance: 0 Referee: Muhammad Taqi (Singapore)

2 September 2021 2022 World Cup qualification	Iran	1–0	Syria	Tehran, Iran
20:30 UTC+4:30	Jahanbakhsh 56'	Report		Stadium: Azadi Stadium; Attendance: 0 Referee: Ryuji Sato (Japan)

7 September 2021 2022 World Cup qualification	Syria	1–1	United Arab Emirates	Amman, Jordan
19:00 UTC+3	Al Baher 64'	Report	Mabkhout 12'	Stadium: King Abdullah II Stadium; Attendance: 0 Referee: Ahmed Al-Kaf (Oman)

7 October 2021 2022 World Cup qualification	South Korea	2–1	Syria	Ansan, South Korea
20:00 UTC+9	Hwang In-beom 47'; Son Heung-min 88'	Report	Khribin 83'	Stadium: Ansan Wa~ Stadium; Attendance: 0 Referee: Abdulrahman Al-Jassim (Qatar)

12 October 2021 2022 World Cup qualification	Syria	2–3	Lebanon	Amman, Jordan
19:00 UTC+3	Khribin 20'; Al Somah 65'	Report	Kdouh 45+1', 45+3'; Saad 53'	Stadium: King Abdullah II Stadium; Attendance: 2,377; Referee: Chris Beath (Australia)

11 November 2021 2022 World Cup qualification	Iraq	1–1	Syria	Doha, Qatar
20:00 UTC+3	Al-Ammari 86' (pen.)	Report	Al Somah 79'	Stadium: Thani bin Jassim Stadium; Attendance: 50; Referee: Nawaf Shukralla (Bahrain)

16 November 2021 2022 World Cup qualification	Syria	0–3	Iran	Amman, Jordan
18:00 UTC+2		Report	Azmoun 33'; Hajsafi 42' (pen.); Gholizadeh 89'	Stadium: King Abdullah II Stadium; Referee: Ma Ning (China PR)

30 November 2021 2021 FIFA Arab Cup	United Arab Emirates	2–1	Syria	Doha, Qatar
22:00 UTC+3	Caio 24'; Saleh 30'	Report	Al Salama 60'	Stadium: Ras Abu Aboud Stadium; Referee: Janny Sikazwe (Zambia)

3 December 2021 2021 FIFA Arab Cup	Syria	2–0	Tunisia	Al Khor, Qatar
22:00 UTC+3	Kass Kawo 4'; Anz 47'	Report		Stadium: Al Bayt Stadium; Referee: Fernando Hernández Gómez (Mexico)

6 December 2021 2021 FIFA Arab Cup	Syria	1–2	Mauritania	Al Wakrah, Qatar
18:00 UTC+3	Al Baher 52'	Report	Soueid 50'; Tanjy 90+4'	Stadium: Al Janoub Stadium; Referee: Wilton Sampaio (Brazil)

=== 2022 ===
27 January 2022 2022 World Cup qualification	United Arab Emirates	2–0	Syria	Dubai, United Arab Emirates
19:00 UTC+4	Caio 43'; Al Ghassani 70'	Report		Stadium: Al Maktoum Stadium; Referee: Ilgiz Tantashev (Uzbekistan)

1 February 2022 2022 World Cup qualification	Syria	0–2	South Korea	Dubai, United Arab Emirates
18:00 UTC+4		Report	Kim Jin-su 53'; Kwon Chang-hoon 71'	Stadium: Rashid Stadium; Attendance: 310; Referee: Hiroyuki Kimura (Japan)

24 March 2022 2022 World Cup qualification	Lebanon	0–3	Syria	Sidon, Lebanon
14:00 UTC+2		Report	Al Dali 14'; Mardikian 38' (pen.); Al Marmour 44'	Stadium: Saida Municipal Stadium; Referee: Abdulrahman Al-Jassim (Qatar)

29 March 2022 2022 World Cup qualification	Syria	1–1	Iraq	Dubai, United Arab Emirates
17:45 UTC+4	Al Dali 3'	Report	Hussein 31'	Stadium: Rashid Stadium; Referee: Ryuji Sato (Japan)

1 June 2022 Friendly	Syria	1–0	Tajikistan	Dubai, United Arab Emirates
18:45 UTC+3	Al Somah 16'	Report		Stadium: Shabab Al Ahli Stadium

23 September 2022 Friendly	Jordan	2–0	Syria	Amman, Jordan
21:00 UTC+3	Samir 28'; 44'			Stadium: King Abdullah II Stadium

26 September 2022 Friendly	Syria	0–1	Iraq	Amman, Jordan
19:00 UTC+3			Hussein 27'	Stadium: King Abdullah II Stadium

17 November 2022 Friendly	Syria	0–1	Belarus	Dubai, United Arab Emirates
19:00 UTC+3		Report	Krouma 81' (o.g.)	Stadium: Maktoum bin Rashid Al Maktoum Stadium; Referee: Yahya Ali Al Mulla (United Arab Emirates)

20 November 2022 Friendly	Syria	1–2	Venezuela	Dubai, United Arab Emirates
21:00 UTC+4	Rihanieh 49'		Torregrossa 39'; Rondón 50'	Stadium: Rashid Stadium

23 December 2022 Friendly	Oman	2–1	Syria	Dubai, United Arab Emirates
20:00 UTC+4	Al Subhi 21'; Saleh 58'	Report	Ashkar 60'	Stadium: Maktoum bin Rashid Al Maktoum Stadium

30 December 2022 Friendly	Syria	0–1	Oman	Dubai, United Arab Emirates
18:00 UTC+4		Report	Al-Braiki 86'	Stadium: Dubai Police Club Stadium

=== 2023 ===
25 March 2023 Friendly	Syria	3–1	Thailand	Dubai, United Arab Emirates
21:00 UTC+4	Al Somah 26'; Khribin 56' (pen.); Al Hallak 84'	Report	Mueanta 45+3'	Stadium: Maktoum bin Rashid Al Maktoum Stadium

28 March 2023 Friendly	Bahrain	1–0	Syria	Arad, Bahrain
21:30 UTC+4	Al-Khalasi 43'	Report		Stadium: Al Muharraq Stadium

20 June 2023 Friendly	Vietnam	1–0	Syria	Nam Định, Vietnam
19:30 UTC+7	Phạm Tuấn Hải 49'	Report		Stadium: Thiên Trường Stadium; Referee: Tuan Yasin (Malaysia)

6 September 2023 Friendly	Syria	2–2	Malaysia	Chengdu, China
17:00 UTC+8	Mardikian 12'; Samia 41'	Report	Akhyar 51'; Lok 85'	Stadium: Chengdu University Football Stadium; Referee: Shen Yinhao (China)

12 September 2023 Friendly	China	0–1	Syria	Chengdu, China
19:35 UTC+8		Report	Krouma 59'	Stadium: Chengdu Phoenix Hill Football Stadium; Attendance: 12,367; Referee: Sami Al-Jires (Saudi Arabia)

17 October 2023 Friendly	Syria	1–2	Kuwait	Dubai, United Arab Emirates
	Al Somah 17'	Report	Al-Khaldi 43', 45+2'	Stadium: Police Officers' Club Stadium

16 November 2023 2026 World Cup qualification	Syria	1–0	North Korea	Jeddah, Saudi Arabia
20:00 UTC+3	Al Somah 37' (pen.)	Report		Stadium: Prince Abdullah Al Faisal Stadium (Note: Syria will play their home game at a neutral venue due to the ongoing Syrian civil war.); Referee: Alireza Faghani (Iran)

21 November 2023 2026 World Cup qualification	Syria	0–5	Japan	Jeddah, Saudi Arabia
17:45 UTC+3		Report	Kubo 32'; Ueda 37', 40'; Sugawara 47'; Hosoya 82'	Stadium: Prince Abdullah Al Faisal Stadium; Referee: Ma Ning (China)

=== 2024 ===
5 January 2024 Unofficial Friendly	Syria	1–1	Kyrgyzstan	Dubai, United Arab Emirates
18:30 UTC+4	Kurdaghli (red card) 59'; Hesar 71'	Report	Akmatov 48'	Stadium: Maktoum bin Rashid Al Maktoum Stadium

8 January 2024 Friendly	Syria	2–2	Malaysia	Doha, Qatar
20:30 UTC+3	Sabbag 70'; Hesar 74'	Report	Arif 39'; Josué 78'	Stadium: Grand Hamad Stadium

13 January 2024 2023 AFC Asian Cup	Uzbekistan	0–0	Syria	Al Rayyan, Qatar
20:30 UTC+3				Stadium: Jassim bin Hamad Stadium; Attendance: 10,198; Referee: Ahmed Al-Kaf (Oman)

18 January 2024 2023 AFC Asian Cup	Syria	0–1	Australia	Al Rayyan, Qatar
14:30 UTC+3			Irvine 59'	Stadium: Jassim bin Hamad Stadium; Attendance: 10,097; Referee: Adel Al-Naqbi (United Arab Emirates)

23 January 2024 2023 AFC Asian Cup	Syria	1–0	India	Al Khor, Qatar
14:30 UTC+3	Khribin 76'			Stadium: Al Bayt Stadium; Referee: Sivakorn Pu-udom (Thailand)

31 January 2024 AFC Asian Cup R16	Iran	1–1 (a.e.t.) (5–3 p)	Syria	Doha, Qatar
19:00 UTC+3	Taremi 34' (pen.)	Report	Khribin 64' (pen.)	Stadium: Abdullah bin Khalifa Stadium; Referee: Kim Jong-hyeok (South Korea)
	Penalties
	Ansarifard (penalty scored); Rezaeian (penalty scored); Ebrahimi (penalty scored); Torabi (penalty scored); Hajsafi (penalty scored)		(penalty scored) Sabbag; (penalty missed) Youssef; (penalty scored) Ousou; (penalty scored) Al Dali

21 March 2024 2026 World Cup qualification	Myanmar	1–1	Syria	Yangon, Myanmar
18:00 UTC+6:30	Kyaw 35'	Report (FIFA); Report (AFC)	Al Dali 71'	Stadium: Thuwunna Stadium

26 March 2024 2026 World Cup qualification	Syria	7–0	Myanmar	Dammam, Saudi Arabia
22:00 UTC+3	Khribin 30', 54', 63' (pen.); Hesar 47'; Ajan 51', 68'; Al-Dali 80'	Report (FIFA); Report (AFC)		Stadium: Prince Mohamed bin Fahd Stadium; Referee: Pranjal Banerjee (India)

6 June 2024 2026 World Cup qualification	North Korea	1–0	Syria	Vientiane, Laos (Note: Following the incident over North Korea's refusal to host a home game against Japan, North Korea will play their home matches in a neutral ground, per Syria's request.)
20:00 UTC+7	Jong Il-gwan 90+2'	Report (FIFA); Report (AFC)		Stadium: New Laos National Stadium; Attendance: 100; Referee: Salman Falahi (Qatar)

11 June 2024 2026 World Cup qualification	Japan	5–0	Syria	Hiroshima, Japan
--:--	Ueda 13'; Dōan 19'; Krouma 21' (o.g.); Soma 73' (pen.); Minamino 85'	Report (FIFA); Report (AFC)		Stadium: Edion Peace Wing Hiroshima; Attendance: Ahmed Al-Ali (Kuwait); Referee: Ahmad Al-Ali (Kuwait)

6 September 2024 2024 Intercontinental Cup	Syria	2–0	Mauritius	Hyderabad, India
19:30 UTC+5:30	Citorah 32' (o.g.); Al-Mawas 70'	Report		Stadium: G.M.C Balayogi Athletic Stadium; Referee: Harish Kundu (India)

9 September 2024 2024 Intercontinental Cup	India	0–3	Syria	Hyderabad, India
19:30 IST (UTC+05:30)		Report	Al Aswad 7'; Irandust 76'; Sabbag 90+6'	Stadium: G.M.C Balayogi Athletic Stadium; Attendance: 19,982; Referee: Nivon Robesh (Sri Lanka)

11 October 2024 2024 King's Cup	Syria	1–0	Tajikistan	Songkhla, Thailand
16:30 UTC+7	Osman 65'	Report		Stadium: Tinsulanon Stadium; Referee: Wiwat Jumpaoon (Thailand)

14 October 2024 2024 King's Cup	Syria	1–2	Thailand	Songkhla, Thailand
20:00 UTC+7	Ham 53'	Report	Ekanit 44'; Chanathip 90+1'	Stadium: Tinsulanon Stadium

19 November 2024 Friendly	Russia	4–0	Syria	Volgograd, Russia
	Osipenko 33', 81' (pen.); Samoshnikov 52'; Miranchuk 66'			Stadium: Volgograd Arena; Referee: Jansen Foo Chuan Hui (Singapore)

=== 2025 ===
25 March 2025 2027 AFC Asian Cup qualification	Syria	2–0	Pakistan	Al Hofuf, Saudi Arabia (Note: Syria played their home matches at a neutral venue due to the ongoing Syrian civil war.)
21:00 UTC+3	Faqa 23'; Al Somah 56'	Report; Report (AFC)		Stadium: Prince Abdullah bin Jalawi Stadium; Attendance: 1,217; Referee: Sivakorn Pu-Udom (Thailand)

10 June 2025 2027 AFC Asian Cup qualification	Afghanistan	0–1	Syria	Al Hofuf, Saudi Arabia
20:15 UTC+3			Al Somah 6'	Stadium: Prince Abdullah bin Jalawi Stadium; Referee: Yousif Saeed Hasan (Iraq)

4 September 2025 Friendly	United Arab Emirates	3–1	Syria	Dubai, United Arab Emirates
19:30 UTC+4	Ivković 62'; Al-Ghassani 78' (pen.); Gastón Suárez 86'	Report	Al Salkhadi 36'	Stadium: Zabeel Stadium

8 September 2025 Friendly	Syria	2–2	Kuwait	Doha, Qatar
	Shamoun 24'; Faqa 80'	Report	Dashti 65'; Daham 74'	Stadium: Jassim bin Hamad Stadium

9 October 2025 2027 AFC Asian Cup qualification	Syria	5–1	Myanmar	Al Hofuf, Saudi Arabia (Note: Syria played their home matches at a neutral venue due to the ongoing Syrian civil war.)
	Khribin 5', 19', 71'; Al Salkhadi 29'; Al Hallaq 88'		Kyaw 90+1'	Stadium: Prince Abdullah bin Jalawi Stadium

14 October 2025 2027 AFC Asian Cup qualification	Myanmar	0–3	Syria	Yangon, Myanmar
			Sabbag 80', 85'; Al Salkhadi 87'	Stadium: Thuwunna Stadium

18 November 2025 2027 AFC Asian Cup qualification	Pakistan	0–5	Syria	Islamabad, Pakistan
14:00 UTC+5		Report; Report (AFC)	Al Hallaq 34', 47'; Samia 79', 90+4'; Al Dali 90'	Stadium: Jinnah Sports Stadium; Attendance: 7,124; Referee: Virendha Rai (Bhutan)

25 November 2025 2025 FIFA Arab Cup qualifiers	Syria	2–0	South Sudan	Doha, Qatar
19:00 UTC+3	Al Hallaq 52'; Al Mawas 59'	Report		Stadium: Grand Hamad Stadium; Referee: Amin Mohamed Omar (Egypt)

1 December 2025 2025 FIFA Arab Cup	Tunisia	0–1	Syria	Al Rayyan, Qatar
16:00 UTC+3		Report	Khribin 48'	Stadium: Ahmad bin Ali Stadium; Attendance: 26,966; Referee: Juan Gabriel Calderón (Costa Rica)

4 December 2025 2025 FIFA Arab Cup	Syria	1–1	Qatar	Al Rayyan, Qatar
20:00 UTC+3	Khribin 90'	Report	Alaaeldin 77'	Stadium: Khalifa International Stadium; Attendance: 42,467; Referee: Mario Escobar (Guatemala)

7 December 2025 2025 FIFA Arab Cup	Syria	0–0	Palestine	Al Rayyan, Qatar
20:00 UTC+3		Report		Stadium: Education City Stadium; Attendance: 39,571; Referee: Ahmed Al-Kaf (Oman)

11 December 2025 2025 FIFA Arab Cup Quarter-finals	Morocco	1–0	Syria	Al Rayyan, Qatar
17:30 UTC+3	Azaro 79'; Moufid (red card) 90+1'	Report		Stadium: Khalifa International Stadium; Attendance: 39,167; Referee: Cristián Garay (Chile)

=== 2026 ===
31 March 2027 AFC Asian Cup qualification	Syria	5–1	Afghanistan	Jeddah, Saudi Arabia
18:15 UTC+3	Al Salkhadi 5'; Al Hallaq 54'; Al Mustafa 58', 82'; Al Aswad 90+1'	Report; Report (AFC)	Panahi 23'	Stadium: Prince Abdullah Al-Faisal Sports City Stadium; Attendance: 562; Referee: Nasrullo Kabirov (Tajikistan)

5 June Friendly	Belarus	4–1	Syria	Minsk, Belarus
19:00 UTC+3	Morozov 3'; Kontsevoy 11'; Shumansky 48'; Yablonsly 78'	Report	Al-Mawas 88' (pen.)	Stadium: National Football Stadium; Referee: Aliyar Aghayev (Azerbaijan)

9 June Friendly	Syria	Cancelled	Bahrain	Antalya, Turkey
--:-- UTC+3				Stadium: Gloria Sports Arena

4 October Friendly	Sri Lanka	v	Syria
		Report

=== 2027 ===
9 January 2027 Asian Cup GS	Syria	v	Kyrgyzstan	Riyadh, Saudi Arabia
--:--				Stadium: King Fahd Sports City Stadium

14 January 2027 Asian Cup GS	China	v	Syria	Jeddah, Saudi Arabia
--:--				Stadium: Prince Abdullah Al-Faisal Stadium

18 January 2027 Asian Cup GS	Iran	v	Syria	Riyadh, Saudi Arabia
--:--				Stadium: King Fahd Sports City Stadium

== Head-to-head record ==
As of 5 June 2026 after the match against Belarus.

Opponent	Pld	W	D	L	GF	GA	GD	Win %
Afghanistan	2	2	0	0	6	1	+5	100.00
Australia	1	0	0	1	0	1	−1	0.00
Bahrain	2	0	0	2	1	4	−3	0.00
Belarus	2	0	0	2	1	5	−4	0.00
China	2	1	0	1	2	3	−1	50.00
Guam	1	1	0	0	3	0	+3	100.00
India	2	2	0	0	4	0	+4	100.00
Iran	4	0	1	3	1	8	−7	0.00
Iraq	3	0	2	1	2	3	−1	0.00
Japan	2	0	0	2	0	10	−10	0.00
Jordan	2	0	0	2	0	3	−3	0.00
Kuwait	2	0	1	1	3	4	−1	0.00
Lebanon	2	1	0	1	5	3	+2	50.00
Malaysia	2	0	2	0	4	4	+0	0.00
Maldives	1	1	0	0	4	0	+4	100.00
Mauritania	1	0	0	1	1	2	−1	0.00
Mauritius	1	1	0	0	2	0	+2	100.00
Morocco	1	0	0	1	0	1	−1	0.00
Myanmar	4	3	1	0	16	2	+14	75.00
North Korea	2	1	0	1	1	1	+0	50.00
Oman	2	0	0	2	1	3	−2	0.00
Pakistan	2	2	0	0	7	0	+7	100.00
Palestine	1	0	1	0	0	0	+0	0.00
Qatar	1	0	1	0	1	1	+0	0.00
Russia	1	0	0	1	0	4	−4	0.00
South Korea	2	0	0	2	1	4	−3	0.00
South Sudan	1	1	0	0	2	0	+2	100.00
Tajikistan	2	2	0	0	2	0	+2	100.00
Thailand	2	1	0	1	4	3	+1	50.00
Tunisia	2	2	0	0	3	0	+3	100.00
United Arab Emirates	4	0	1	3	3	8	−5	0.00
Uzbekistan	2	1	1	0	1	0	+1	50.00
Venezuela	1	0	0	1	1	2	−1	0.00
Vietnam	1	0	0	1	0	1	−1	0.00
Total	63	22	11	30	82	81	+1	34.92
