= 2023 AFC Asian Cup Group B =

Group B of the 2023 AFC Asian Cup took place from 13 to 23 January 2024. The group consisted of Australia, Uzbekistan, Syria and India. The top two teams, Australia and Uzbekistan, along with third-place Syria (as one of the four best third-placed teams), advanced to the round of 16.

== Teams ==
Draw position	Team	Zone	Method of qualification	Date of qualification	Finals appearance	Last appearance	Previous best performance	FIFA Rankings	
Draw position	Team	Zone	Method of qualification	Date of qualification	Finals appearance	Last appearance	Previous best performance	April 2023 (Note: The rankings of April 2023 were used for seeding for the final draw.)	December 2023
B1	Australia	AFF	Second round Group B winners	11 June 2021	5th	2019	Winners (2015)	29	25
B2	Uzbekistan	CAFA	Third round Group C winners	14 June 2022	8th	2019	Fourth place (2011)	74	68
B3	Syria	WAFF	Second round Group A winners	7 June 2021	7th	2019	Group stage (1980, 1984, 1988, 1996, 2011, 2019)	90	91
B4	India	SAFF	Third round Group D winners	14 June 2022	5th	2019	Runners-up (1964)	101	102

== Standings ==
Pos	Team	Pld	W	D	L	GF	GA	GD	Pts	Qualification
1	Australia	3	2	1	0	4	1	+3	7	Advance to knockout stage
2	Uzbekistan	3	1	2	0	4	1	+3	5	Advance to knockout stage
3	Syria	3	1	1	1	1	1	0	4	Advance to knockout stage
4	India	3	0	0	3	0	6	−6	0	

Source: AFC
Rules for classification: Group stage tiebreakers

== Matches ==
=== Australia vs India ===
This was the first time in 13 years that these two teams had faced each other, as their last meeting had been in the 2011 AFC Asian Cup, which saw Australia beat India with a scoreline of 4–0. Australia had not lost to India in 68 years.

After a scoreless first half, an attempt to punch the ball away from Gurpreet Singh Sandhu saw the ball intercepted by Jackson Irvine, who scored Australia's opening goal to break the deadlock despite Gurpreet's effort to block it in the 50th minute. At the 72nd minute, Riley McGree pulled a phase to overcome Lalengmawia Ralte before delivering the decisive pass for Jordan Bos, who then scored in the almost empty net to secure Australia's 2–0 win.

In personal record, it was the first time Graham Arnold managed to win the opening fixture as coach of Australia (1D, 2L), after failing to do so back in the 2007 and 2019 AFC Asian Cups as well as the 2022 FIFA World Cup.

13 January 2024
14:30

Australia	2–0	India
Irvine 50'; Bos 73'	Report

Ahmad bin Ali Stadium, Al Rayyan
Attendance: 36,253
Referee: Yoshimi Yamashita (Japan)

Australia	India

GK	1	Mathew Ryan (c)
RB	25	Gethin Jones
CB	19	Harry Souttar
CB	4	Kye Rowles
LB	16	Aziz Behich
CM	17	Keanu Baccus	(substituted off) 82'
CM	22	Jackson Irvine
RW	6	Martin Boyle	(substituted off) 63'
AM	8	Connor Metcalfe	(substituted off) 64'
LW	23	Craig Goodwin	(substituted off) 72'
CF	15	Mitchell Duke	(substituted off) 72'
Substitutions:
FW	7	Samuel Silvera	(substituted on) 63'
MF	14	Riley McGree	(substituted on) 64'
DF	5	Jordan Bos	(substituted on) 72'
FW	9	Bruno Fornaroli	(substituted on) 72'
MF	13	Aiden O'Neill	(substituted on) 82'
Manager:
Graham Arnold

GK	1	Gurpreet Singh Sandhu
RB	21	Nikhil Poojary
CB	5	Sandesh Jhingan
CB	2	Rahul Bheke
LB	3	Subhasish Bose		(substituted off) 75'
CM	25	Deepak Tangri		(substituted off) 79'
CM	19	Lalengmawia Ralte
CM	8	Suresh Singh Wangjam		(substituted off) 74'
RF	9	Manvir Singh
CF	11	Sunil Chhetri (c)		(substituted off) 89'
LF	17	Lallianzuala Chhangte		(substituted off) 89'
Substitutions:
MF	12	Liston Colaco		(substituted on) 74'
DF	6	Akash Mishra		(substituted on) 75'
MF	7	Anirudh Thapa		(substituted on) 79'
FW	24	Vikram Partap Singh		(substituted on) 89'
MF	14	Naorem Mahesh Singh	(yellow card) 90+4'	(substituted on) 89'
Manager:
(Croatia) Igor Štimac

Man of the Match:
Craig Goodwin (Australia)

Assistant referees:
Makoto Bozono (Japan)
Naomi Teshirogi (Japan)
Fourth official:
Yusuke Araki (Japan)
Reserve assistant referee:
Jun Mihara (Japan)
Video assistant referee:
Hiroyuki Kimura (Japan)
Assistant video assistant referees:
Jumpei Iida (Japan)

=== Uzbekistan vs Syria ===
This was the second time that these teams had met in the Asian Cup, having met before in 1996 with Syria emerging victorious among the two after a 2–1 win against Uzbekistan. Their most recent fixture had been a friendly in 2020 where the Syrians beat the Uzbeks 1–0 while their most recent competitive fixture occurred during the 2018 FIFA World Cup qualification, which also ended with Syria winning against Uzbekistan by the same scoreline.

The match was largely dominated by Uzbekistan, but neither Uzbekistan nor Syria could score a goal in this match, with the closest attempt being the surprise goal of Ibrahim Hesar, which was later disallowed for being offside.

13 January 2024
20:30

Uzbekistan	0–0	Syria
	Report

Jassim bin Hamad Stadium, Al Rayyan
Attendance: 10,198
Referee: Ahmed Al-Kaf (Oman)

Uzbekistan	Syria

GK	1	Utkir Yusupov
CB	25	Abdukodir Khusanov	(yellow card) 54'
CB	5	Rustam Ashurmatov
CB	15	Umar Eshmurodov
RM	3	Khojiakbar Alijonov		(substituted off) 46'
CM	9	Odiljon Hamrobekov
CM	7	Otabek Shukurov
LM	4	Farrukh Sayfiev
RF	10	Jaloliddin Masharipov (c)		(substituted off) 73'
CF	11	Oston Urunov		(substituted off) 90'
LF	20	Khojimat Erkinov		(substituted off) 46'
Substitutions:
FW	22	Abbosbek Fayzullaev		(substituted on) 46'
DF	13	Sherzod Nasrullaev		(substituted on) 46'
FW	21	Igor Sergeev		(substituted on) 73'
FW	19	Azizbek Turgunboev		(substituted on) 90'
Manager:
(Slovenia) Srečko Katanec

GK	22	Ahmad Madania (c)
RB	24	Abdul Rahman Weiss
CB	13	Thaer Krouma
CB	2	Aiham Ousou
LB	3	Moayad Ajan
RM	21	Ibrahim Hesar
CM	18	Jalil Elías
CM	4	Ezequiel Ham
LM	12	Ammar Ramadan
CF	25	Mahmoud Al Aswad	(yellow card) 31'	(substituted off) 70'
CF	11	Pablo Sabbag		(substituted off) 70'
Substitutions:
FW	7	Omar Khribin		(substituted on) 70'
MF	17	Fahd Youssef		(substituted on) 70'
Manager:
(Argentina) Héctor Cúper

Man of the Match:
Abdul Rahman Weiss (Syria)

Assistant referees:
Abu Bakar Al-Amri (Oman)
Rashid Al-Ghaithi (Oman)
Fourth official:
Mohanad Qasim Sarray (Iraq)
Reserve assistant referee:
Watheq Al-Swaiedi (Iraq)
Video assistant referee:
Khamis Al-Marri (Qatar)
Assistant video assistant referees:
Salman Falahi (Qatar)

=== Syria vs Australia ===
This was the second straight match between these two teams as they had also faced each other in the previous edition of the Asian Cup, with Australia beating Syria 3–2 to send themselves through to the knockout stage and eliminate the Syrians. Syria had never managed to beat their Southeast Asian counterpart in three past meetings.

Australia immediately tried to apply early pressure, but it was Syria that got the closest opportunity to score when from a long-range pass by Abdul Rahman Weiss, Ibrahim Hesar captured in Australia's penalty area and sent the ball to Pablo Sabbag, whose shot later hit the left post at the 5th minute. In the 17th minute, Jackson Irvine tried his luck with a header from a set-piece but it went wild as Australia increasingly became more dominant, but they failed to score. Syria, however, suddenly sped up in the final minutes of the first half but they could not convert it. At the second half, in the 59th minute, from Gethin Jones's pass, Martin Boyle made an effort to solo over Syrian defenders, but while his last pass ended up hitting Jalil Elías, it deflected wide enough for Irvine as he pierced the ball over Ahmad Madania to score the only goal of the match; despite Syrian fightback, notably a long-range firing from Moayad Ajan at the 68th minute that saw Mathew Ryan almost fail to hold, Australia went on to assert their domination at the later minutes but they could not score as the result was settled in favour for the Australians.

It was the third consecutive match in which Australia defeated Syria by a one-goal margin.

18 January 2024
14:30

Syria	0–1	Australia
	Report	Irvine 59'

Jassim bin Hamad Stadium, Al Rayyan
Attendance: 10,097
Referee: Adel Al-Naqbi (United Arab Emirates)

Syria	Australia

GK	22	Ahmad Madania (c)
RB	24	Abdul Rahman Weiss
CB	2	Aiham Ousou
CB	13	Thaer Krouma
LB	3	Moayad Ajan
RM	25	Mahmoud Al Aswad	(substituted off) 65'
CM	18	Jalil Elías
CM	4	Ezequiel Ham
LM	12	Ammar Ramadan
CF	11	Pablo Sabbag	(substituted off) 65'
CF	21	Ibrahim Hesar	(substituted off) 78'
Substitutions:
MF	17	Fahd Youssef	(substituted on) 65'
FW	7	Omar Khribin	(substituted on) 65'
FW	20	Antonio Yakoub	(substituted on) 78'
Manager:
(Argentina) Héctor Cúper

GK	1	Mathew Ryan (c)
RB	25	Gethin Jones
CB	19	Harry Souttar
CB	21	Cameron Burgess
LB	16	Aziz Behich
DM	13	Aiden O'Neill	(yellow card) 27'	(substituted off) 57'
CM	8	Connor Metcalfe		(substituted off) 57'
CM	22	Jackson Irvine
RF	6	Martin Boyle		(substituted off) 83'
CF	15	Mitchell Duke		(substituted off) 78'
LF	5	Jordan Bos		(substituted off) 57'
Substitutions:
MF	17	Keanu Baccus		(substituted on) 57'
FW	7	Samuel Silvera	(yellow card) 85'	(substituted on) 57'
MF	14	Riley McGree		(substituted on) 57'
FW	9	Bruno Fornaroli		(substituted on) 78'
FW	10	Kusini Yengi		(substituted on) 83'
Manager:
Graham Arnold

Man of the Match:
Jackson Irvine (Australia)

Assistant referees:
Mohamed Al-Hammadi (United Arab Emirates)
Hasan Al-Mahri (United Arab Emirates)
Fourth official:
Mooud Bonyadifard (Iran)
Reserve assistant referee:
Alireza Ildorom (Iran)
Video assistant referee:
Mohammed Abdulla Hassan Mohamed (United Arab Emirates)
Assistant video assistant referees:
Abdulla Al-Marri (Qatar)

=== India vs Uzbekistan ===
Uzbekistan had never lost against India, with their most recent fixture being played 22 years ago as part of the 2001 Merdeka Tournament. In competitive fixtures, the last time they met was in the 2000 AFC Asian Cup qualification, where Uzbekistan beat India 3–2.

Uzbekistan got off to an advantageous start at the fourth minute when in an offensive effort, Sherzod Nasrullaev provided a clinical high pass for Otabek Shukurov, whose header provided for Abbosbek Fayzullaev saw Fayzullaev score a goal. Uzbekistan improved at the 18th minute when a clumsy coordination by Indian defenders allowed Fayzullaev to pull a phase on India's right flank, which delivered a nearly lethal low pass that hit the foot of Akash Mishra. Although the ball hit the right post, Igor Sergeev was quick to sink the ball into the goal. Uzbekistan then completed the game in the first half when Jaloliddin Masharipov himself put a solo over the Indians from the midfield before sending wide; despite being cleared, it was intercepted by Oston Urunov, whose pass for Farrukh Sayfiev proved decisive as Sayfiev's high pass this time for Nasrullaev saw his shot initially hit the right post, but then deflect back to Nasrullaev, allowing him to score a goal and end the game with a 3-0 victory for Uzbekistan.

With this defeat, it marked the fourth consecutive match India could not score at the AFC Asian Cup, while in personal record, Srečko Katanec won his third competitive fixture, all in the AFC Asian Cup, after two previous wins over Vietnam and Yemen back in the 2019 edition.

18 January 2024
17:30

India	0–3	Uzbekistan
	Report	Fayzullaev 4'; Sergeev 18'; Nasrullaev 45+4'

Ahmad bin Ali Stadium, Al Rayyan
Attendance: 38,491
Referee: Fu Ming (China)

India	Uzbekistan

GK	1	Gurpreet Singh Sandhu
RB	21	Nikhil Poojary
CB	5	Sandesh Jhingan
CB	2	Rahul Bheke
LB	6	Akash Mishra
CM	8	Suresh Singh Wangjam	(substituted off) 84'
CM	19	Lalengmawia Ralte
RW	9	Manvir Singh	(substituted off) 46'
AM	7	Anirudh Thapa	(substituted off) 72'
LW	14	Naorem Mahesh Singh	(substituted off) 86'
CF	11	Sunil Chhetri (c)	(substituted off) 72'
Substitutions:
FW	16	Rahul K. P.	(substituted on) 46'
MF	10	Brandon Fernandes	(substituted on) 72'
FW	26	Ishan Pandita	(substituted on) 72'
MF	25	Deepak Tangri	(substituted on) 84'
MF	15	Udanta Singh Kumam	(substituted on) 84'
Manager:
(Croatia) Igor Štimac

GK	1	Utkir Yusupov
RB	4	Farrukh Sayfiev
CB	25	Abdukodir Khusanov
CB	15	Umar Eshmurodov
LB	13	Sherzod Nasrullaev	(substituted off) 46'
DM	9	Odiljon Hamrobekov	(substituted off) 83'
CM	7	Otabek Shukurov
CM	22	Abbosbek Fayzullaev	(substituted off) 83'
RF	11	Oston Urunov	(substituted off) 74'
CF	21	Igor Sergeev
LF	10	Jaloliddin Masharipov (c)	(substituted off) 74'
Substitutions:
DF	26	Zafarmurod Abdurakhmatov	(substituted on) 46'
MF	19	Azizbek Turgunboev	(substituted on) 74'
MF	20	Khojimat Erkinov	(substituted on) 74'
MF	8	Jamshid Iskanderov	(substituted on) 83'
MF	14	Jamshid Boltaboev	(substituted on) 83'
Manager:
(Slovenia) Srečko Katanec

Man of the Match:
Otabek Shukurov (Uzbekistan)

Assistant referees:
Zhou Fei (China)
Zhang Cheng (China)
Fourth official:
Adham Makhadmeh (Jordan)
Reserve assistant referee:
Mohammad Al-Kalaf (Jordan)
Video assistant referee:
Omar Al-Ali (United Arab Emirates)
Assistant video assistant referees:
Yusuke Araki (Japan)

=== Australia vs Uzbekistan ===
This was the third time that these two teams met in this tournament with their recent fixture being in the round of 16 of the last edition of the Asian Cup, in which Australia beat Uzbekistan in a penalty shootout after a scoreless draw to send the Australians into the last eight and eliminate the Uzbeks. Australia had never lost against Uzbekistan in all four previous encounters, which included a 6–0 victory when both nations met in the 2011 AFC Asian Cup, held at Khalifa International Stadium in Al Rayyan, Qatar.

Although Australia had confirmed their place at the knockout stage with a game to spare, they still opted to bring some veterans, notably Mathew Ryan and Harry Souttar, into the encounter. In the 41st minute, in a chaotic ball fight in Uzbekistan's defense area, Kusini Yengi made his effort to solo over before his ball touched the hand of Odiljon Hamrobekov; VAR later confirmed it as a penalty and Martin Boyle clinically scored to give Australia the lead at the first minute of extra time. However, as the Australians loosened their focus, an offensive by the Uzbeks saw Jaloliddin Masharipov send the ball wide enough for Azizbek Turgunboev to score a header in the 78th minute, as both teams were satisfied with a draw that secured their progression.

In personal record, Graham Arnold had not beaten Uzbekistan as a coach (D2). At the same time, Turgunboev's header meant it was the first time in five attempts that Uzbekistan managed to score against Australia. Interestingly, Australia had never collected nine points in all of their AFC Asian Cup participation. In personal record however, it was the first time Graham Arnold managed to lead his team to top the group stage table, having never done so back in the 2007 AFC Asian Cup, 2019 AFC Asian Cup and 2022 FIFA World Cup.

23 January 2024
14:30

Australia	1–1	Uzbekistan
Boyle 45+1' (pen.)	Report	Turgunboev 78'

Al Janoub Stadium, Al Wakrah
Attendance: 15,290
Referee: Yusuke Araki (Japan)

Australia	Uzbekistan

GK	1	Mathew Ryan (c)
RB	3	Nathaniel Atkinson
CB	19	Harry Souttar	(yellow card) 50'
CB	4	Kye Rowles
LB	16	Aziz Behich
DM	17	Keanu Baccus		(substituted off) 84'
CM	14	Riley McGree	(yellow card) 70'	(substituted off) 83'
CM	22	Jackson Irvine
RF	6	Martin Boyle		(substituted off) 72'
CF	10	Kusini Yengi
LF	5	Jordan Bos		(substituted off) 90+3'
Substitutions:
MF	8	Connor Metcalfe		(substituted on) 72'
FW	9	Bruno Fornaroli		(substituted on) 83'
MF	13	Aiden O'Neill		(substituted on) 83'
FW	11	Marco Tilio		(substituted on) 90+3'
DF	20	Lewis Miller		(substituted on) 90+3'
Manager:
Graham Arnold

GK	1	Utkir Yusupov
CB	18	Abdulla Abdullaev
CB	5	Rustam Ashurmatov
CB	15	Umar Eshmurodov	(yellow card) 25'
RM	26	Zafarmurod Abdurakhmatov
CM	9	Odiljon Hamrobekov	(yellow card) 45'
CM	7	Otabek Shukurov (c)	(yellow card) 45+3'
LM	4	Farrukh Sayfiev
RF	20	Khojimat Erkinov		(substituted off) 63'
CF	22	Abbosbek Fayzullaev		(substituted off) 63'
LF	11	Oston Urunov		(substituted off) 46'
Substitutions:
MF	10	Jaloliddin Masharipov		(substituted on) 46'
FW	21	Igor Sergeev		(substituted on) 63' (substituted off) 84'
MF	19	Azizbek Turgunboev		(substituted on) 63'
MF	8	Jamshid Iskanderov		(substituted on) 84'
Manager:
(Slovenia) Srečko Katanec

Man of the Match:
Martin Boyle (Australia)

Assistant referees:
Jun Mihara (Japan)
Takumi Takagi (Japan)
Fourth official:
Ma Ning (China)
Reserve assistant referee:
Zhang Cheng (China)
Video assistant referee:
Jumpei Iida (Japan)
Assistant video assistant referees:
Fu Ming (China)

=== Syria vs India ===
The most recent fixture between these two teams had been in 2019 when they tied in a 1–1 draw during the 2019 Intercontinental Cup. Syria managed to defeat India on just two occasions, while India had not lost against Syria in 15 years. However, this was the first time Syria and India were to face each other in any competitive fixture.

The match was mostly dominated by Syria, but India's resistance left the Syrians frustrated for most of time as India kept staying in line. However, from a failed Indian attack, the Syrians launched a counterattack, resulting in a long-range pass by Jalil Elías to Alaa Al Dali, then again to Omar Khribin before his pass for Ibrahim Hesar was capitalised upon when Hesar's clinical low pressure pass saw Khribin score a goal despite the efforts of Indian defenders to prevent it, giving Syria a historic win.

With this result, combined with the other group's results, this meant for the first-time ever in the history of the Asian Cup that Syria had advanced past the group stages, having failed to do so in the six previous editions they had participated in. For India, this meant that the Indians had a distressing record, failing to score a single goal in five consecutive Asian Cup matches.

23 January 2024
14:30

Syria	1–0	India
Khribin 76'	Report

Al Bayt Stadium, Al Khor
Attendance: 42,787
Referee: Sivakorn Pu-udom (Thailand)

Syria	India

GK	22	Ahmad Madania (c)
RB	24	Abdul Rahman Weiss	(yellow card) 26'
CB	2	Aiham Ousou
CB	13	Thaer Krouma
LB	3	Moayad Ajan
RM	25	Mahmoud Al Aswad		(substituted off) 82'
CM	18	Jalil Elías
CM	4	Ezequiel Ham
LM	12	Ammar Ramadan		(substituted off) 69'
CF	11	Pablo Sabbag		(substituted off) 46'
CF	21	Ibrahim Hesar
Substitutions:
FW	7	Omar Khribin	(yellow card) 77'	(substituted on) 46'
FW	9	Alaa Al Dali		(substituted on) 69'
MF	14	Mouhamad Anez		(substituted on) 82'
Manager:
(Argentina) Héctor Cúper

GK	1	Gurpreet Singh Sandhu
RB	2	Rahul Bheke	(yellow card) 2'
CB	5	Sandesh Jhingan		(substituted off) 47'
CB	3	Subhasish Bose
LB	6	Akash Mishra
CM	19	Lalengmawia Ralte		(substituted off) 81'
CM	25	Deepak Tangri		(substituted off) 64'
RW	9	Manvir Singh		(substituted off) 64'
AM	17	Lallianzuala Chhangte
LW	14	Naorem Mahesh Singh	(yellow card) 26'	(substituted off) 46'
CF	11	Sunil Chhetri (c)
Substitutions:
MF	15	Udanta Singh Kumam		(substituted on) 46'
DF	21	Nikhil Poojary		(substituted on) 47'
MF	18	Sahal Abdul Samad		(substituted on) 64'
MF	8	Suresh Singh Wangjam		(substituted on) 64'
MF	7	Anirudh Thapa		(substituted on) 81'
Manager:
(Croatia) Igor Štimac			(yellow card) 54'

Man of the Match:
Ibrahim Hesar (Syria)

Assistant referees:
Rawut Nakarit (Thailand)
Tanate Chuchuen (Thailand)
Fourth official:
Kim Jong-hyeok (South Korea)
Reserve assistant referee:
Yoon Jae-yeol (South Korea)
Video assistant referee:
Muhammad Taqi (Singapore)
Assistant video assistant referees:
Adel Al-Naqbi (United Arab Emirates)

== Discipline ==
Fair play points would have been used as tiebreakers if the overall and head-to-head records of teams were tied. These were calculated based on yellow and red cards received in all group matches as follows:

- first yellow card: −1 point;
- indirect red card (second yellow card): −3 points;
- direct red card: −3 points;
- yellow card and direct red card: −4 points;

Only one of the above deductions was applied to a player in a single match.

Team	Match 1				Match 2				Match 3				Points
Team	Booked	(yellow card) (yellow-red card)	Sent off (straight red)	(yellow card) (red card)	Booked	(yellow card) (yellow-red card)	Sent off (straight red)	(yellow card) (red card)	Booked	(yellow card) (yellow-red card)	Sent off (straight red)	(yellow card) (red card)	Points
Australia					2				2				–4
Uzbekistan	1								3				–4
Syria	1								2				–3
India	1								2				–3
