= Daleho Irandust =

Syrian footballer (born 1998)

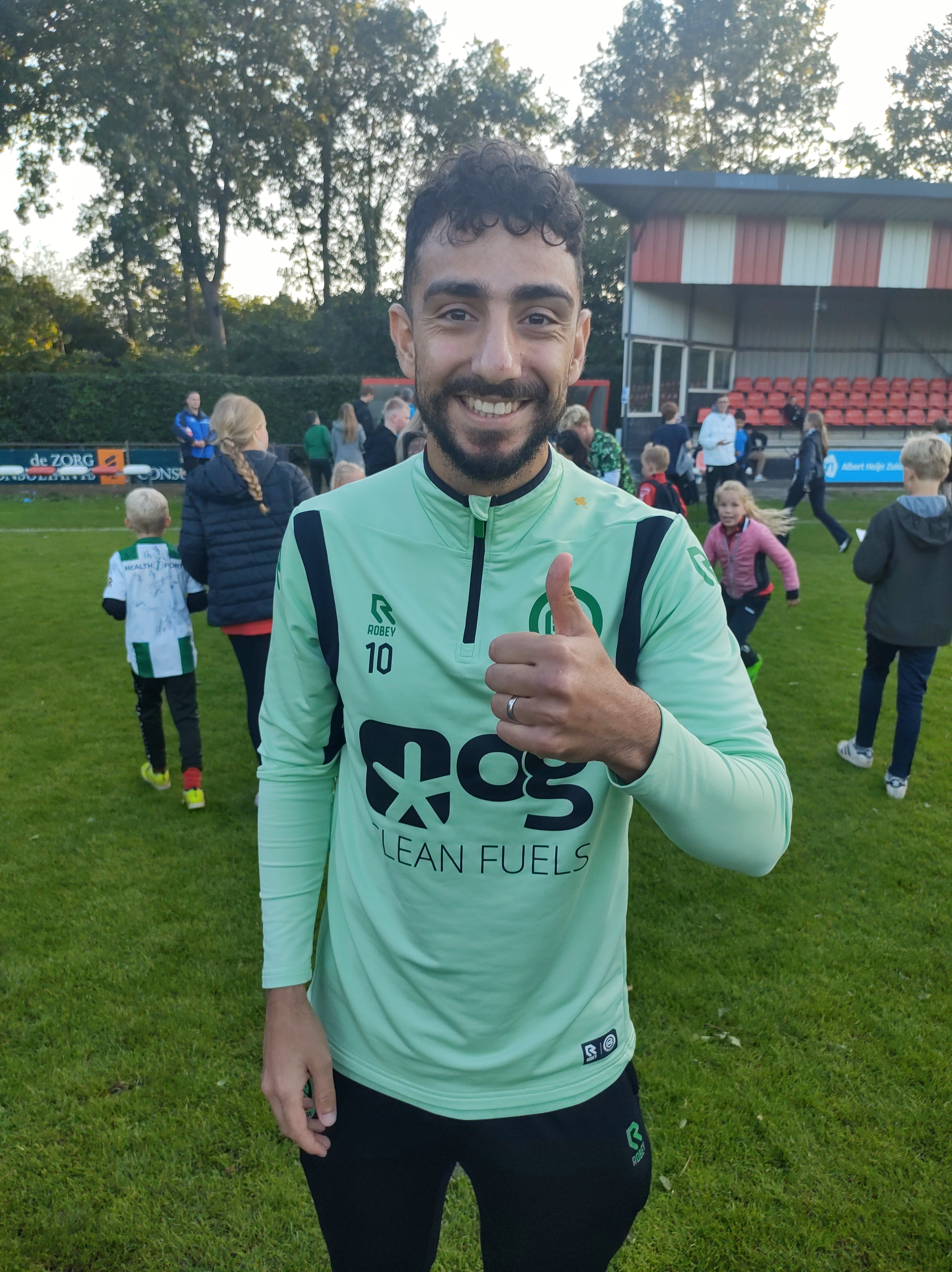
- Irandust with Groningen

Personal information
- Full name: Daleho Mohsen Irandust
- Date of birth: 4 June 1998 (age 28)
- Place of birth: Gothenburg, Sweden
- Height: 1.85 m (6 ft 1 in)
- Positions: Attacking midfielder; winger

Team information
- Current team: Shaanxi Union
- Number: 19

Youth career
- –2012: Balltorps FF
- 2013–2015: GAIS
- 2016: BK Häcken

Senior career*
Years	Team	Apps	(Gls)
2017–2021	BK Häcken	111	(18)
2021–2024	Groningen	44	(1)
2024–2025	IF Brommapojkarna	44	(4)
2026–	Shaanxi Union	0	(0)

International career^{‡}
2015–2017	Sweden U19	4	(1)
2018–2020	Sweden U21	8	(0)
2019–2020	Sweden	3	(0)
2024–	Syria	3	(1)
- * Club domestic league appearances and goals as of 12 November 2025 ‡ National team caps and goals as of 9 September 2024

Daleho Mohsen Irandust (Persian: دالاهو ایراندوست, pronunciation: [dɒːlɒːhu irɒːnduːst]; Arabic: دالیهو ایراندست; born 4 June 1998) is a professional footballer who plays as an attacking midfielder for China League One club Shaanxi Union. Born in Sweden and a former Swedish international, he plays for the Syria national team.

== Early life ==
Irandust was born and raised in Gothenburg, Sweden, to Kurdish-Iranian parents from Iran. He has stated that his family was persecuted by the Iranian regime.

== Club career ==
=== BK Häcken ===
Irandust won the Gothia Cup in 2016 with the under-19 side of BK Häcken. Irandust made his debut for the senior side of Häcken with a goal and two assists on 24 August 2016 against Växjö in the 2016–17 Svenska Cupen. He made his Allsvenskan debut for Häcken on 9 April 2017 against Djurgården. He scored his first Allsvenskan goal for the club on 5 May 2017 against Sirius, before scoring his second a week later in a 1–0 win at Kalmar. He was nominated for the newcomer of the year award at the end of the 2017 Allsvenskan season with two goals and five assists.

Irandust scored a free kick against Norrby after opening the scoring against Värnamo in the 2017–18 Svenska Cupen. He scored his first goal of the 2018 Allsvenskan season on 7 July 2018 against GIF Sundsvall. He made his UEFA debut in the following match with a goal and an assist on 12 July in the 2018–19 UEFA Europa League. He scored another goal in the next round of the Europa League for a 1–1 draw against German Bundesliga side RB Leipzig.

Irandust scored his first goal of the 2019 Allsvenskan season in their opening match against Malmö FF and provided an assist to Alexander Faltsetas in the Swedish Cup final to qualify Häcken for the 2019–20 UEFA Europa League.

He scored his first goal of the 2020 Allsvenskan season in their opening match against Falkenberg before scoring from his own half a week later against IK Sirius. His first goal of the 2021 Allsvenskan season was scored on 18 July 2021 for a 1–0 win against IFK Norrköping at the Nya Parken.

=== Groningen ===
On 31 August 2021, Irandust joined Dutch Eredivisie side FC Groningen, receiving the number 10 jersey after Arjen Robben on a five-year deal for an approximately SEK 3 million transfer fee. He made his club debut on 12 September 2021 during the 2021–22 season in an Eredivisie match against Heerenveen at the Euroborg. He scored his first goal for the club and provided an assist to Romano Postema on 27 October 2021 in a KNVB Cup match against Helmond Sport. Irandust scored his first Eredivisie goal and provided an assist to Jørgen Strand Larsen on 27 November 2021 in a league match against Fortuna Sittard.

=== IF Brommapojkarna ===
On 27 February 2024, Irandust returned to Sweden with IF Brommapojkarna on a two-year contract.

=== Shaanxi Union ===
On 20 February 2026, Irandust joined China League One club Shaanxi Union.

== International career ==
Irandust has Iranian origins through both parents and was therefore eligible to represent Iran, while through his father, whose Kurdish background connects to communities in Syria and Iraq, he was also eligible to represent Syria or Iraq. Having been born and raised in Sweden, Irandust was also eligible to represent Sweden.

=== Youth ===
Irandust played for the Sweden U19 national team between 2015 and 2017. In June 2017, Irandust reaffirmed his decision to represent Sweden over Iran.

He was called into the Sweden U21 team on 27 August 2017 for the 2019 UEFA European Under-21 Championship qualification. Irandust made his debut for the under-21s on 7 June 2018 with an assist to Carlos Strandberg in a 4–0 win over Malta. He was called into the under-21 squad in August 2019 for the start of their 2021 UEFA European Under-21 Championship qualification campaign. He provided assists to Pontus Almqvist and Gustav Henriksson in September 2020 during a 3–0 win over Italy.

=== Senior ===
==== Sweden ====
Irandust was called into the Sweden national team by manager Janne Andersson on 3 December 2018 for their January 2019 friendly matches against Finland and Iceland. He made his international debut for Sweden on 8 January 2019 against Finland.

==== Syria ====
In March 2024, Irandust was called up to the Syria national football team for 2026 FIFA World Cup qualification matches against Myanmar. Irandust scored his first international goal on 9 September 2024 against India at the G. M. C. Balayogi Athletic Stadium during the 2024 Intercontinental Cup, which ended in a 3–0 victory.

== Style of play ==
Irandust has been praised for his creativity and sharp left foot.

== Personal life ==
Irandust is outfitted by American sportswear manufacturer Nike.

== Career statistics ==
=== Club ===
As of 1 September 2021

Appearances and goals by club, season and competition
Club	Season	League			Cup		Continental		Total	
Club	Season	Division	Apps	Goals	Apps	Goals	Apps	Goals	Apps	Goals
Häcken	2017	Allsvenskan	25	2	2	1	—		27	3
Häcken	2018	Allsvenskan	29	4	4	2	3	2	36	8
Häcken	2019	Allsvenskan	27	4	2	0	2	0	31	4
Häcken	2020	Allsvenskan	23	6	5	2	—		28	8
Häcken	2021	Allsvenskan	7	2	1	0	—		8	2
Career total			111	18	14	5	5	2	130	25

=== International ===
As of 26 March 2024

Appearances and goals by national team and year
National team	Year	Apps	Goals
Sweden	2019	2	0
Sweden	2020	1	0
Total		3	0
Syria	2024	2	0
Syria	Total	2	0
Total		5	0

==== International goals ====
No.	Date	Venue	Opponent	Score	Result	Competition
1.	9 September 2024	G. M. C. Balayogi Athletic Stadium, Hyderabad, India	India	2–0	3–0	2024 Intercontinental Cup

== Honours ==
BK Häcken

- Gothia Cup: 2016
- Svenska Cupen: 2018–19
