= 2024 Intercontinental Cup (India) =

Tournament details
- Host country: India
- City: Hyderabad
- Dates: 3–9 September 2024
- Teams: 3 (from 2 confederations)
- Venue: 1 (in 1 host city)

Final positions
- Champions: Syria (1st title)
- Runners-up: Mauritius
- Third place: India

Tournament statistics
- Matches played: 3
- Goals scored: 5 (1.67 per match)
- Attendance: 42,004 (14,001 per match)
- Top scorer(s): (Syria) Mahmoud Al-Mawas (Syria) Mahmoud Al Aswad (Syria) Daleho Irandust (Syria) Pablo Sabbag (1 goal each)
- Best player: (Syria) Mahmoud Al-Mawas

The 2024 Intercontinental Cup was the fourth edition of the Intercontinental Cup, a three-nation football tournament, typically a four-nation tournament, held at the G. M. C. Balayogi Athletic Stadium, in the Indian city of Hyderabad in September 2024. The tournament was organized by the All India Football Federation (AIFF). India won the previous edition by a 2–0 victory over Lebanon in the final in June of 2023. Syria won this edition by finishing in first place of the round-robin standings after defeating Mauritius 2–0 and India 3–0. With one goal each, Mahmoud Al-Mawas, Mahmoud Al Aswad, Daleho Irandust, and Pablo Sabbag finished as joint-top scorers of the tournament. Mahmoud Al-Mawas of Syria was awarded best player of the tournament.

== Participating nations ==
The tournament was played by teams from two different confederations in the FIFA international window from 2 to 10 September 2024. India, as host, is joined by Syria from the Asian Football Confederation (AFC), and Mauritius from the Confederation of African Football (CAF). The teams play each other in a round-robin phase, and the winner in the group stage was the champion.

The FIFA Rankings of the participating national teams, as of 18 July 2024:

- Syria (93) – second appearance
- India (124) – fourth appearance - host
- Mauritius (179) – first appearance

== Venue ==
- All matches are being held at the G. M. C. Balayogi Athletic Stadium in Hyderabad, India.

Hyderabad	2024 Intercontinental Cup (India) is located in India
G. M. C. Balayogi Athletic Stadium	2024 Intercontinental Cup (India) is located in India
17°26′48.42″N 78°20′40.91″E	2024 Intercontinental Cup (India) is located in India
Capacity: 18,000 seats	2024 Intercontinental Cup (India) is located in India

== Standings ==
=== Round robin ===
Pos	Team	Pld	W	D	L	GF	GA	GD	Pts	
1	Syria	2	2	0	0	5	0	+5	6	Champions
2	Mauritius	2	0	1	1	0	2	−2	1	Runners-up
3	India (H)	2	0	1	1	0	3	−3	1	Third place

Source: AIFF
(H) Hosts

== Matches ==
3 September 2024
19:30 IST (UTC+05:30)

India	0–0	Mauritius
	Report

G. M. C. Balayogi Athletic Stadium, Hyderabad
Attendance: 18,976
Referee: Mohamed Javiz (Maldives)
6 September 2024
19:30 IST (UTC+05:30)

Syria	2–0	Mauritius
Citorah 32' (o.g.); Al Mawas 70'	Report

G. M. C. Balayogi Athletic Stadium, Hyderabad
Attendance: 3,046
Referee: Harish Kundu (India)
9 September 2024
19:30 IST (UTC+05:30)

India	0–3	Syria
	Report	Al Aswad 7'; Irandust 76'; Sabbag 90+6'

G. M. C. Balayogi Athletic Stadium, Hyderabad
Attendance: 19,982
Referee: Nivon Robesh (Sri Lanka)

== Goalscorers ==
There were 5 goals scored in 3 matches, for an average of 1.67 goals per match.

1 goal

- (Syria) Mahmoud Al-Mawas
- (Syria) Mahmoud Al Aswad
- (Syria) Daleho Irandust
- (Syria) Pablo Sabbag

1 own goal

- (Mauritius) Brendon Citorah (against Syria)

== Marketing ==
=== Sponsors ===
- PERFORMAX Activewear
- Nivia Sports
- IndiGo

=== Broadcasting rights ===
Disney+ Hotstar and JioTV have the rights to the majority of the Indian National Team's matches and they also covered the previous edition of the tournament. On 22 August 2024, the Indian National Football Team announced that Jio Cinema would stream all of the matches live. They also announced the Sports18 3 will broadcast all of the matches. There has been no news of any broadcasters covering the tournament outside of India.

== Symbols ==
=== Match ball ===
The match balls were provided by Nivia Sports. The "NIVIA Shastra 2.0" were the specific model used in the tournament. It was the first time the ball was used for an international match.
