= Ahmad Madania =

Syrian footballer (born 1990)

Personal information
- Full name: Ahmad Madania
- Date of birth: 1 January 1990 (age 36)
- Place of birth: Latakia, Syria
- Height: 1.80 m (5 ft 11 in)
- Position: Goalkeeper

Team information
- Current team: Al-Wathba
- Number: 1

Youth career
- Tishreen

Senior career*
Years	Team	Apps	(Gls)
2011–2013	Tishreen		
2014–2019	Al-Jaish		
2019–2023	Tishreen		
2023–2024	Jableh		
2024	Al-Faisaly		
2024–2025	Al-Riffa		
2025–	Al-Wathba		

International career^{‡}
2007	Syria U17	4	(0)
2018	Syria U23	4	(0)
2016–	Syria	32	(0)
- * Club domestic league appearances and goals as of 02:58, 30 December 2018 (UTC) ‡ National team caps and goals as of 4 September 2025

Ahmad Madania or Ahmad Madanieh (Arabic: أَحمَد مَدَنِيَّة; born 1 January 1990) is a Syrian professional footballer who plays as a goalkeeper for Al-Wathba and the Syria national team.

== Career ==
Madania was included in Syria's squad for the 2019 AFC Asian Cup in the United Arab Emirates.

== Career statistics ==
=== International ===
As of 20 November 2018

Syria
Year	Apps	Goals
2016	2	0
2017	3	0
2018	2	0
Total	7	0
