= Pablo Sabbag =

Syrian footballer (born 1997)

Pablo Sabbag بابلو صبّاغ
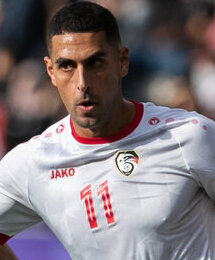
- Sabbag with Syria at the 2023 Asian Cup

Personal information
- Full name: Pablo David Sabbag Daccarett
- Date of birth: 11 June 1997 (age 29)
- Place of birth: Barranquilla, Colombia
- Height: 1.90 m (6 ft 3 in)
- Position: Forward

Team information
- Current team: Cerezo Osaka
- Number: 19

Youth career
- –2015: Deportivo Cali

Senior career*
Years	Team	Apps	(Gls)
2015–2019	Deportivo Cali	25	(3)
2016	→ Orsomarso (loan)	13	(2)
2018–2019	→ Tondela (loan)	5	(1)
2019–2025	La Equidad	47	(12)
2021	→ Newell's Old Boys (loan)	8	(1)
2021	→ Estudiantes (loan)	6	(0)
2023–2024	→ Alianza Lima (loan)	37	(13)
2025–2026	Suwon FC	34	(17)
2026	Al-Ahli Tripoli	9	(4)
2026–	Cerezo Osaka	7	(0)

International career^{‡}
2024–	Syria	11	(4)
- * Club domestic league appearances and goals as of 24 May 2026 ‡ National team caps and goals as of 5 June 2026

Pablo David Sabbag Daccarett (born 11 June 1997) is a professional footballer who plays as a forward for J1 League club Cerezo Osaka. Born in Colombia, he plays for the Syria national team.

== Early life ==
Sabbag was born in Barranquilla, Colombia, to a Syrian father and Palestinian mother.

== Club career ==
On 28 January 2025, Sabbag joined Suwon FC of South Korean top-tier league, K League 1. In February 2026, he joined Libyan Premier League side Al-Ahli Tripoli for a reported transfer fee of $2 million, a record in the league.

On 10 August 2026, Sabbag signed for J1 League club Cerezo Osaka.

== International career ==
Sabbag was called up to the Syria national team under coach Héctor Cúper for the 2023 AFC Asian Cup.

== Career statistics ==
=== International goals ===
No.	Date	Venue	Opponent	Score	Result	Competition
1.	8 January 2024	Grand Hamad Stadium, Doha, Qatar	Malaysia	1–1	2–2	Friendly
2.	9 September 2024	G. M. C. Balayogi Athletic Stadium, Hyderabad, India	India	3–0	3–0	2024 Intercontinental Cup
3.	14 October 2025	Thuwunna Stadium, Yangon, Myanmar	Myanmar	1–0	3–0	2027 AFC Asian Cup qualification
4.	14 October 2025	Thuwunna Stadium, Yangon, Myanmar	Myanmar	2–0	3–0	2027 AFC Asian Cup qualification

== Honours ==
Individual

- K League 1 Best XI: 2025
- K League 1 top goalscorer: 2025
