= Mahmoud Al Aswad =

Syrian footballer (born 2003)

Personal information
- Date of birth: 14 September 2003 (age 23)
- Place of birth: Homs, Syria
- Height: 1.83 m (6 ft 0 in)
- Positions: Attacking midfielder; winger

Team information
- Current team: Salmiya

Youth career
- –2019: Al-Karamah

Senior career*
Years	Team	Apps	(Gls)
2019–2024	Al-Karamah		
2024–2025	Zakho		
2025	Al-Salmiya		
2025–2026	Al-Karamah		
2026–	Salmiya		

International career^{‡}
2021–2023	Syria U20	13	(5)
2022–	Syria U23	4	(2)
2023–	Syria	25	(2)
- * Club domestic league appearances and goals ‡ National team caps and goals as of 17 November 2026

Mahmoud Al Aswad (Arabic: محمود الاسود; born 14 September 2003) is a Syrian footballer who plays as an attacking midfielder or winger for Salmiya and the Syria national team.

== Club career ==
Born in Homs, Al-Aswad is a youth product of his local club Al-Karamah. In 2019, when he was 16 years old, he was promoted from the under-19 team to the first team of Al-Karamah.

== International career ==
Having represented Syria at under-20 and under-23 level, Al-Aswad was called up to the senior squad in November 2022 for friendlies against Belarus and Venezuela. On 20 November 2022, Al-Aswad made his international debut with the Syria national team in a 1–2 friendly defeat against Venezuela.

In January 2024, Al-Aswad was named in Syria's 26-men squad for the 2023 AFC Asian Cup. He started in all of Syria's matches during the tournament as a right winger as the team got eliminated in the round of 16.

== International goals ==
No.	Date	Venue	Opponent	Score	Result	Competition
1.	9 September 2024	G. M. C. Balayogi Athletic Stadium, Hyderabad, India	India	1–0	3–0	2024 Intercontinental Cup
2.	31 March 2026	Prince Abdullah Al-Faisal Sports City Stadium, Jeddah, Saudi Arabia	Afghanistan	5–1	5–1	2027 AFC Asian Cup qualification

== Career statistics ==
=== International ===
As of matches played 9 September 2024

National team	Year	Apps	Goals
Syria	2022	1	0
Syria	2023	0	0
Syria	2024	8	1
Total		9	1
