= Ibrahim Hesar =

Syrian footballer (born 1993)

Personal information
- Full name: Ibrahim Fares Hesar
- Date of birth: 15 November 1993 (age 32)
- Place of birth: Villa Ascasubi, Córdoba, Argentina
- Height: 1.83 m (6 ft 0 in)
- Positions: Winger; attacking midfielder; second striker

Team information
- Current team: Estudiantes RC
- Number: 77

Youth career
- Belgrano

Senior career*
| Years | Team | Apps | (Gls) |
| 2014–2017 | Tiro Federal | 63 | (17) |
| 2018–2021 | Estudiantes RC | 40 | (12) |
| 2021–2024 | Belgrano | 51 | (5) |
| 2024 | Foolad | 12 | (1) |
| 2024–2026 | Zakho | | |
| 2026– | Estudiantes RC | 14 | (3) |

International career^{‡}
| 2023– | Syria | 9 | (1) |
- * Club domestic league appearances and goals as of 17:42, 8 November 2026 (UTC) ‡ National team caps and goals as of 11 June 2024

Ibrahim Fares Hesar (Arabic: إِبْرَاهِيم فَارِس حِصَار; born 15 November 1993) is a professional footballer who plays as a left winger for Estudiantes RC. Born in Argentina, he plays for the Syria national team.

== Career ==
Hesar began his playing career with Tiro Federal in 2014. After 3 seasons there, he moved to Estudiantes de Río Cuarto in 2018 in the Primera Nacional. In December 2021, he transferred to Belgrano. He helped Belgrano achieve promotion into the Argentine Primera División for 2023.

== International career ==
Born in Argentina, Hesar is of Syrian and Lebanese descent through his grandparents. He was called up to the Syria national team for a set of 2026 FIFA World Cup qualification matches in November 2023.

== International goals ==
| No. | Date | Venue | Opponent | Score | Result | Competition |
|---|---|---|---|---|---|---|
| 1. | 8 January 2024 | Grand Hamad Stadium, Doha, Qatar | Malaysia | 2–1 | 2–2 | Friendly^{1} |
| 2. | 26 March 2024 | Prince Mohamed bin Fahd Stadium, Dammam, Saudi Arabia | Myanmar | 2–0 | 7–0 | 2026 FIFA World Cup qualification |

^{1} Not FIFA 'A' International match.
