= Ali El Fadl =

Lebanese footballer (born 2003)

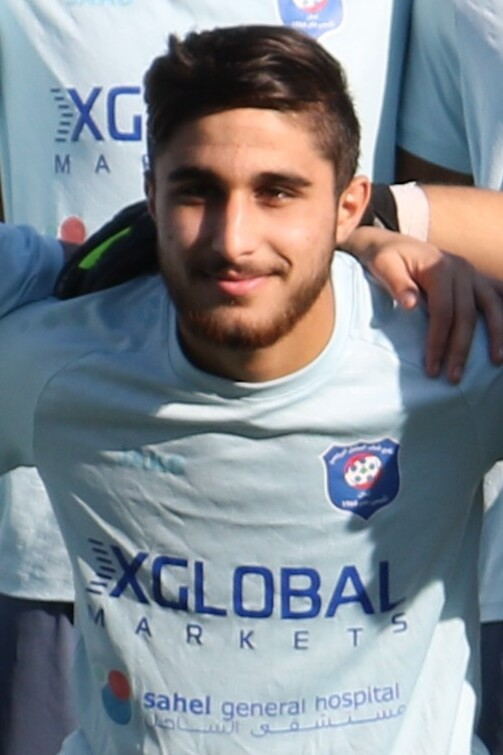
- El Fadl with Shabab Sahel in 2022

Personal information
- Full name: Ali Naim El Fadl
- Date of birth: 29 March 2003 (age 23)
- Place of birth: Ghaziyeh, Lebanon
- Height: 1.70 m (5 ft 7 in)
- Position: Midfielder

Team information
- Current team: Nejmeh
- Number: 21

Youth career
- –2020: Shabab Sahel

Senior career*
Years	Team	Apps	(Gls)
2020–2025	Shabab Sahel	52	(6)
2025	Safa	10	(0)
2025–	Nejmeh	26	(5)

International career^{‡}
2021	Lebanon U18	4	(3)
2021–2022	Lebanon U20		(0)
2023–2026	Lebanon U23	11	(4)
2026–	Lebanon	3	(0)
Medal record
Men's football
Representing Lebanon
WAFF U-18 Championship
Silver medal – second place	2021	U-18 Team
- * Club domestic league appearances and goals as of 09:37, 3 August 2026 (UTC) ‡ National team caps and goals as of 17 November 2026

Ali Naim El Fadl (Arabic: علي نعيم الفضل; born 29 March 2003) is a Lebanese footballer who plays as a midfielder for Lebanese Premier League club Nejmeh and the Lebanon national team.

== Club career ==
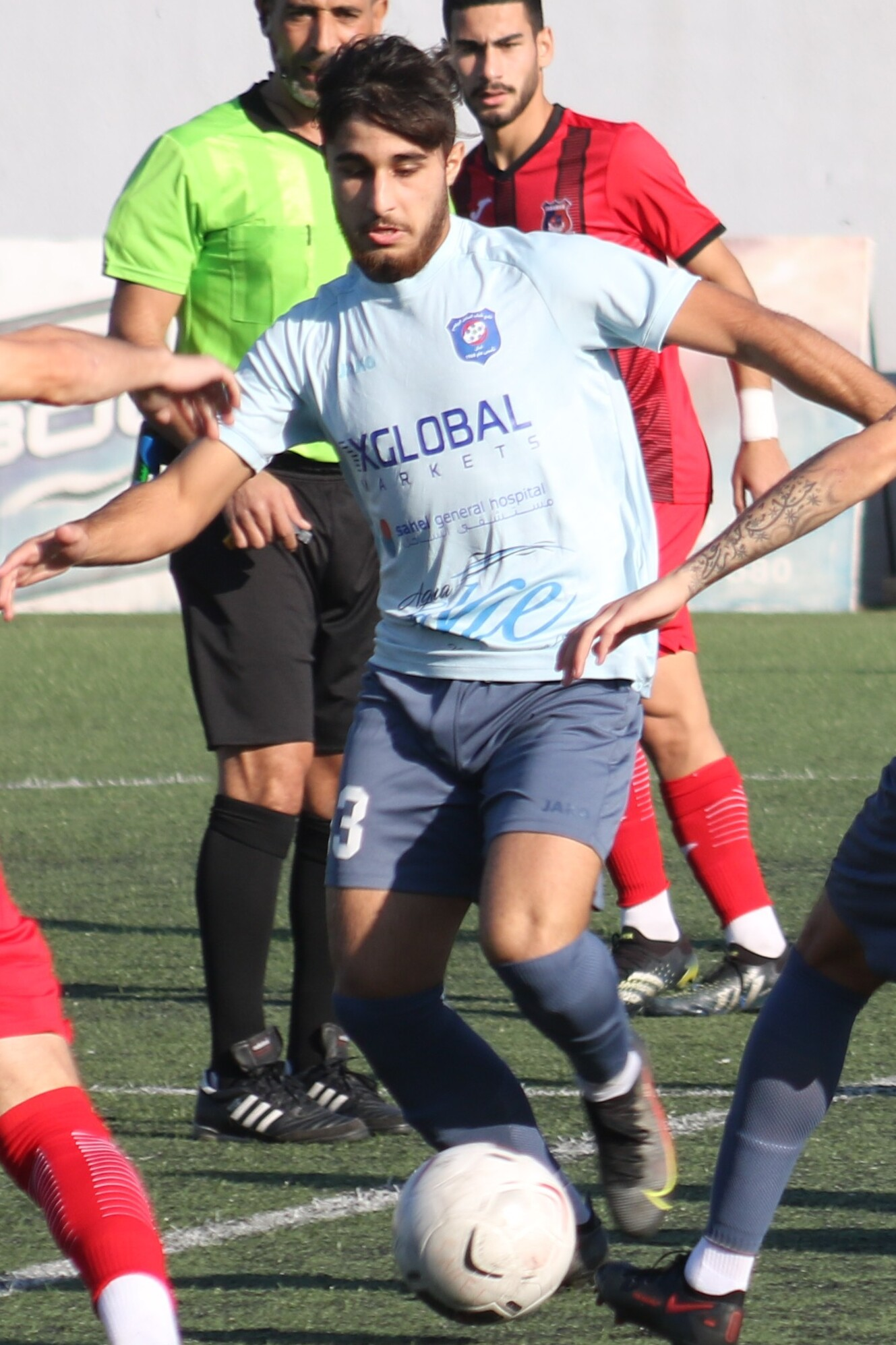
El Fadl with Shabab Sahel during the 2021–22 Lebanese Premier League

Coming through the youth system, El Fadl was integrated into Shabab Sahel's first-team squad in 2020. During the 2023–24 season, he provided the assist for a stoppage-time equaliser in a 1–1 draw against Safa. During his four-year tenure at Sahel, El Fadl played 61 games in all competitions and scored seven goals in the process.

In January 2025, Safa announced the signing of El Fadl on a five-year contract. He remained for half a season, playing 10 games in 2024–25.

In August 2025, El Fadl joined Nejmeh ahead of the 2025–26 season. In January 2026, he scored a stoppage-time winner against Ansar in the 2025–26 Lebanese FA Cup quarter-finals, sending Nejmeh through to the semi-finals. He scored again in the semi-final against Jwaya in February, before scoring in Nejmeh's 2–0 victory over Sagesse in the final in July, helping the club win their ninth title. With three goals, El Fadl finished as the competition's top scorer.

== International career ==
=== Youth ===
El Fadl represented Lebanon at various youth levels. He was a key player in Lebanon's 2021 WAFF U-18 Championship campaign, scoring in victories over Syria, the United Arab Emirates, and Jordan. Lebanon reached the final, where they drew 0–0 with Iraq before losing on penalties, while El Fadl was named the tournament's best player. He was subsequently selected for the 2021 Arab Cup U-20 and the 2022 Arab Cup U-20.

He later became a regular for the Lebanon under-23 team. In 2025, he represented Lebanon at the WAFF U-23 Championship, scoring in a 2–2 draw with Syria. Later that year, he scored in victories over Malaysia and Mongolia during the 2026 AFC U-23 Asian Cup qualifiers, helping Lebanon qualify for the tournament for the first time. At the 2026 AFC U-23 Asian Cup, he captained Lebanon, scoring in a 4–2 defeat against South Korea. He also helped Lebanon secure a 1–0 victory over Iran, the country's first-ever win in the competition.

=== Senior ===
In May 2026, El Fadl received his first call-up to the senior Lebanon national team for a 2027 AFC Asian Cup qualification match against Yemen on 4 June. He made his debut on 4 June, starting in a 2–0 defeat to Yemen.

== Career statistics ==
=== Club ===
As of match played 21 May 2026

Appearances and goals by club, season and competition
Club	Season	League			Lebanon Cup		League cup (Note: Includes Lebanese Elite Cup, Lebanese Federation Cup)		Other		Total	
Club	Season	Division	Apps	Goals	Apps	Goals	Apps	Goals	Apps	Goals	Apps	Goals
Shabab Sahel	2020–21	Lebanese Premier League	2	0	0	0	—		—		2	0
Shabab Sahel	2021–22	Lebanese Premier League	11	0	1	0	1	0	—		13	0
Shabab Sahel	2022–23	Lebanese Premier League	18	4	3	1	2	0	—		23	5
Shabab Sahel	2023–24	Lebanese Premier League	20	2	1	0	1	0	—		22	2
Shabab Sahel	2024–25	Lebanese Premier League	1	0	—		—		—		1	0
Shabab Sahel	Total		52	6	5	1	4	0	0	0	61	7
Safa	2024–25	Lebanese Premier League	10	0	—		—		—		10	0
Nejmeh	2025–26	Lebanese Premier League	15	4	2	2	—		3 (Note: Appearances in National Solidarity Tournament)	1	20	7
Career total			77	10	7	3	4	0	3	1	91	14

=== International ===
As of match played 17 November 2026

Appearances and goals by national team and year
National team	Year	Apps	Goals
Lebanon	2026	3	0
Total		3	0

== Honours ==
Nejmeh

- Lebanese FA Cup: 2025–26

Lebanon U18

- WAFF U-18 Championship runner-up: 2021

Individual

- WAFF U-18 Championship Best Player: 2021
- Lebanese FA Cup top scorer: 2025–26
