= Mahmoud Deeb =

Jordanian footballer (born 2005)

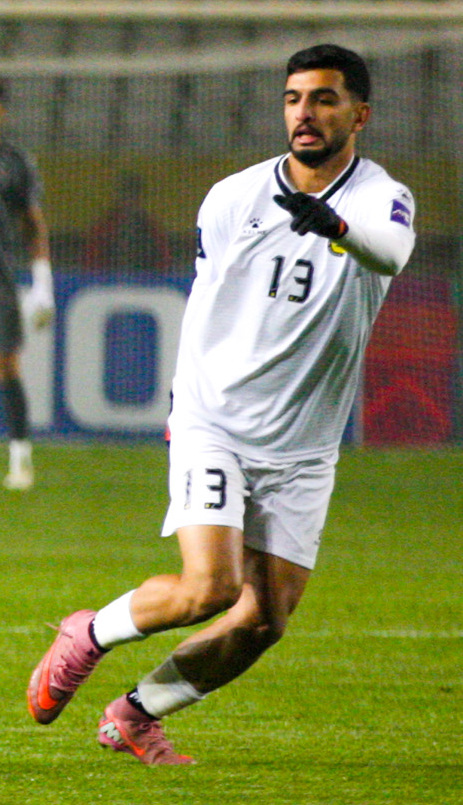
- Deeb with Al-Hussein in 2025

Personal information
- Full name: Mahmoud Mohammad Ali Deeb
- Date of birth: 8 September 2005 (age 21)
- Place of birth: Irbid, Jordan
- Height: 1.82 m (6 ft 0 in)
- Position: Winger

Team information
- Current team: Al-Hussein
- Number: 17

Youth career
- –2024: Al-Hussein

Senior career*
Years	Team	Apps	(Gls)
2024–	Al-Hussein	22	(5)
2024–2025	→Al-Sareeh (loan)	15	(1)

International career^{‡}
2023–2025	Jordan U20	11	(2)
2025–	Jordan U23	7	(1)
- * Club domestic league appearances and goals as of 8 May 2026 ‡ National team caps and goals as of 16 January 2026

Mahmoud Mohammad Ali Deeb (Arabic: مَحْمُود مُحَمَّد عَلِيّ ذِيب; born 8 September 2005), sometimes known as Mahmoud Khrouba (Arabic: مَحْمُود خَرُّوبَة), is a Jordanian professional footballer who plays as a winger for Jordanian Pro League side Al-Hussein.

== Club career ==
=== Early career ===
Born in Irbid, Deeb began his career at Al-Hussein. On 9 March 2024, Deeb won the U19 league with his club.

=== Al-Hussein ===
He would make his first contribution to the club at the senior level, when he scored in a friendly match against Syrian club Al-Fotuwa.

On 17 July 2024, Al-Hussein would announce a 5-year contract extension to Deeb.

==== Al-Sareeh (loan) ====
On 23 July 2024, Al-Sareeh announced a season-long loan contract to secure Deeb from Al-Hussein.

==== Return to Al-Hussein ====
On 1 August 2025, during the first matchday of the 2025–26 Jordanian Pro League, Deeb registered two goals in a 5–0 win against Al-Ahli. A month later, Deeb scored his first goal at the AFC Champions League Two in a 1–0 win against Sepahan. On 23 January 2025, Deeb scored a goal in a 4–0 win against Al-Jazeera, where he took inspiration from Christopher Nkunku and Ali Al-Bulayhi and celebrated with a balloon.

== International career ==
Deeb is a youth international for Jordan, beginning his international career with the Jordan national under-20 football team in 2023. He would participate in the 2024 WAFF U-19 Championship, where his team would reach the semi-finals. On 18 January 2025, he would get called up to the team for the U20 Challenge Series and the 2025 AFC U-20 Asian Cup.

On 23 December 2025, Deeb was called up to the 2026 AFC U-23 Asian Cup for the Jordan national under-23 team, participating in all four matches. He scored the winning goal against Saudi Arabia, and registered an assist against Japan.
