= 2024–25 Jordanian Pro League =

Jordanian Pro League
- Season: 2024–25
- Dates: 8 August 2024 – 3 May 2025
- Champions: Al-Hussein (2nd title)
- Relegated: Al-Sareeh; Shabab Al-Aqaba; Ma'an; Moghayer Al-Sarhan
- AFC Champions League Two: Al-Hussein
- AFC Champions League Two: Al-Wehdat (2024–25 Jordan FA Cup winners)
- Matches: 132
- Goals: 348 (2.64 per match)
- Top goalscorer: Mohannad Semreen (Al-Wehdat) (18 goals)
- All statistics correct as of 3 May 2025.

The 2024–25 Jordanian Pro League, known as The Jordanian Pro League, was the 72nd season of Jordanian Pro League since its inception in 1944. The season started on 8 August 2024 and finished on 3 May 2025. Al-Hussein won its second consecutive title.

Al-Hussein are the defending champions of the 2023–24 season. Al Jazeera and Al-Sareeh joined as the promoted clubs from the 2023 Jordan League Division 1. They replaced Sahab and Al-Jalil who were relegated to the 2024 League Division 1.

The Football Association instructions for the 2024-25 season adopted a system of relegating 4 teams from the professional league to the first division.

== Teams ==
Twelve teams will compete in the league – the top ten teams from the 2023–24 season and the two teams promoted from the 2023 Division 1.

The first team to be promoted was Al Jazeera, following their 4–2 victory against Kfarsoum at game week 10 on 24 November 2023. The second team to be promoted was Al-Sareeh, following their 1–0 victory against Al Jazeera at game week 11 on 3 December 2023.

Locations of the 2024–25 Jordan League teams

=== Stadiums and locations ===
Note: Table lists in alphabetical order.

Jordanian Pro League 2024–25
Club	Location	Stadium	Capacity	Year formed
Al-Ahli	Amman, Amman	Petra Stadium	6,000	1944
Al-Faisaly	Amman, Amman	Amman International Stadium	17,619	1932
Al-Hussein	Irbid, Irbid	Al-Hassan Stadium	12,000	1964
Al-Jazeera	Amman, Amman	Amman International Stadium	17,619	1947
Al-Ramtha	Ar-Ramtha, Irbid	Al-Hassan Stadium	12,000	1966
Al-Salt	Al-Salt, Balqa	Prince Hussein Bin Abdullah II Stadium	7,500	1965
Al-Sareeh	Al-Sareeh, Irbid	Al-Hassan Stadium	12,000	1973
Al-Wehdat	Al-Wehdat camp, Amman	King Abdullah Stadium	13,000	1956
Ma'an	Ma'an, Ma'an	Princess Haya Stadium	1,000	1971
Moghayer Al-Sarhan	Badiah Gharbiyah, Mafraq	Prince Mohammed Stadium	15,000	1993
Shabab Al-Aqaba	Aqaba. Aqaba	Al-Aqaba Stadium	3,800	1965
Shabab Al-Ordon	Amman, Amman	King Abdullah Stadium	13,000	2002

=== Personnel and kits ===
Team	Manager	Captain	Kit manufacturer	Shirt sponsor
Al-Ahli	(United States) (Jordan) Bibert Kaghado	(Jordan) Yazan Dahshan	Kelme	
Al-Faisaly	(Jordan) Jamal Abu-Abed	(Jordan) Bara' Marei	Kelme	Umniah
Al-Hussein	(Jordan) Ahmad Hayel	(Jordan) Saed Al-Rosan	Kelme	Amejys Wll Management
Al-Jazeera	(Jordan) Islam Jalal	(Jordan) Ahmad Al-Sughair	Kelme	
Al-Ramtha	(Montenegro) Miljan Radovic	(Jordan) Hamza Al-Dardour	Kelme	
Al-Salt	(Jordan) Haitham Al-Shboul	(Jordan) Miqdad Aref (Jordan) Mohammad Al-Emwase	Kelme	Jordan Aviation
Al-Sareeh	(Jordan) Maher Ajloni	(Jordan) Qusai Al-Maraiha	Kelme	
Al-Wehdat	(Tunisia) Kais Yakoubi	(Jordan) Feras Shelbaieh	Kelme	Umniah
Ma'an	(Jordan) Amer Akl	(Jordan) Ibrahim Al-Rowwad	Kelme	
Moghayer Al-Sarhan	(Jordan) Khaled Al-Daboubi	(Jordan) Hamza Al-Shamali	Kelme	
Shabab Al-Aqaba	(Jordan) Raed Al-Dawoud	(Jordan) Khaled Al-Aswely	Kelme	
Shabab Al-Ordon	(Jordan) Waseem Al-Bzour	(Jordan) Rawad Abu Khizran	Kelme	

=== Managerial changes ===
Team	Outgoing manager	Manner of departure	Date of vacancy	Position in the table	Incoming manager	Date of appointment
Al-Faisaly	(Jordan) Ahmad Hayel	Mutual consent			(Syria) Raafat Mohammad	
Al-Hussein	(Portugal) Tiago Moutinho	Mutual consent			(Portugal) João Mota	
Al-Jazeera	(Jordan) Othman Al-Hasanat	Mutual consent			(Jordan) Mahmoud Shelbaieh	
Al-Salt	(Jordan) Diane Saleh	Resigned			(Jordan) Haitham Al-Shboul	
Shabab Al-Ordon	(Jordan) Mahmoud Shelbaieh	Sacked			(Jordan) Raed Assaf	
Al-Faisaly	(Syria) Raafat Mohammad	Sacked			(Jordan) Jamal Abu-Abed	
Al-Sareeh	(Jordan) Maher Ajloni	Sacked			(Jordan) Osama Qasim	
Al-Jazeera	(Jordan) Mahmoud Shelbaieh	Sacked			(Jordan) Islam Jalal	
Al-Ramtha	(Jordan) Waseem Al-Bzour	Sacked			(Montenegro) Miljan Radovic	
Shabab Al-Ordon	(Jordan) Raed Assaf	Sacked			(Jordan) Waseem Al-Bzour	
Ma'an	(Iraq) Ameen Phillip	Sacked			(Jordan) Amer Akl	
Al-Sareeh	(Jordan) Osama Qasim	Sacked			(Jordan) Maher Ajloni	
Al-Wehdat	(Jordan) Ra'fat Ali	Sacked			(Tunisia) Kais Yakoubi	
Al-Hussein	(Portugal) João Mota	Sacked			(Jordan) Ahmad Hayel	

=== Foreign players ===
Club	Player 1	Player 2	Player 3	Player 4	Former players
Al-Ahli	(Scotland) Leighton McIntosh				(Palestine) Hamada Maraaba (Brazil) Wildson Índio (Palestine) Abdulrhman Wishah (Ivory Coast) Vivien Assie Koua (Lebanon) Omar Sabbagh (Russia) Islam Pekov (Russia) Azamat Ataev (Russia) Vadim Abidokov
Al-Faisaly	(Niger) Amadou Moutari	(Mali) Cheick Traoré	(Tunisia) Mohamed Hamrouni		(Palestine) Tamer Seyam (Palestine) Mus'ab Al-Batat (Syria) Mohamad Rihanieh (Senegal) Simon Diédhiou (Ghana) Mamudo Moro
Al-Hussein	(Senegal) Abdou Aziz Ndiaye	(Brazil) Ítalo da Silva	(Nigeria) Abdul Jeleel Ajagun	(Brazil) Júlio Romaneli	(Republic of the Congo) Jacques Thémopelé
Al-Jazeera	(Palestine) Mohammed Sandouqa	(Palestine) Wajdi Nabhan	(Egypt) Amr Marey	(Egypt) Mostafa Moawad	(Iraq) Waleed Bahar (Palestine) Mohammed Ayob (Colombia) Diego Calderón (Brazil) Leonardo Paiva
Al-Ramtha					(Syria) Yousef Mohammad
Al-Salt	(Algeria) Mounir Ait L'Hadi	(Senegal) Guy Olivier N'Diaye	(Mauritania) Mamadou Niass	(Syria) Abdullah Al Shami	(Egypt) Ahmed Shamsaldin (Palestine) Qais Al-Hattab (Algeria) Ziri Hammar
Al-Sareeh	(Syria) Ali Zakaria	(Syria) Aiman Akil	(Tunisia) Nour Zamen Zammouri	(Democratic Republic of the Congo) Botuli Bompunga	(Palestine) Sameh Maraaba (Algeria) Abderraouf Alouaoui
Al-Wehdat	(Senegal) Ousseynou Gueye	(Ivory Coast) Joseph Guédé Gnadou	(Ghana) Abdul Halik Hudu		(Morocco) Marouane Afallah (Cameroon) Alain Akono (Mali) Ichaka Diarra
Ma'an	(Nigeria) Anoust James Innocent	(Morocco) Bilal Soufi	(Mali) Souleymane Traoré	(Algeria) Walid Athmani	(Algeria) Abdelmalek Meftahi (Senegal) Mouhamed Fall (Syria) Ali Al-Masri (Malawi) Khuda Muyaba
Moghayer Al-Sarhan					(Syria) Samer Khankan (Syria) Suba Al-Hamawi
Shabab Al-Aqaba	(Togo) Abdou Rafikou Atakora	(Togo) Abdoulahakim Aboubakar	(Ghana) Muntala Saeed	(Syria) Abdul Rahman Al-Hussein	(Senegal) Amadou Sané (Mauritania) Mohamed Ely
Shabab Al-Ordon					(Algeria) Abdelmalek Meftahi

== League table ==
Pos	Team	Pld	W	D	L	GF	GA	GD	Pts	Qualification or relegation
1	Al-Hussein (C)	22	16	5	1	53	15	+38	53	Qualification for 2025–26 AFC Champions League Two
2	Al-Wehdat	22	16	4	2	47	18	+29	52	Qualification for 2025–26 AFC Champions League Two (Note: Wehdat qualified for the ACL Two group stage by winning the Jordan FA Cup..)
3	Al-Faisaly	22	9	12	1	30	16	+14	39	
4	Al-Ramtha	22	9	6	7	26	23	+3	33	
5	Al-Salt	22	9	5	8	24	21	+3	32	
6	Al-Jazeera	22	8	6	8	33	29	+4	30	
7	Al-Ahli	22	7	5	10	24	32	−8	26	
8	Shabab Al-Ordon	22	7	4	11	28	33	−5	25	
9	Al-Sareeh (R)	22	4	9	9	26	33	−7	21	Relegation to Jordanian First Division League
10	Shabab Al-Aqaba (R)	22	5	5	12	23	47	−24	20	Relegation to Jordanian First Division League
11	Ma'an (R)	22	5	3	14	20	39	−19	18	Relegation to Jordanian First Division League
12	Moghayer Al-Sarhan (R)	22	3	4	15	16	44	−28	13	Relegation to Jordanian First Division League

Rules for classification: 1) Points; 2) Head-to-head points; 3) Head-to-head goal difference; 4) Head-to-head goals scored; 5) Goal difference; 6) Goals scored;
(C) Champions; (R) Relegated

== Results ==
Home \ Away	ALA	ALB	ALF	ALH	ALJ	ALR	ASA	SRH	ALW	MAA	MOG	SHA
Al-Ahli		0–0	1–2	0–2	1–0	0–1	2–0	3–3	0–2	0–1	3–1	3–2
Shabab Al-Aqaba	1–3		0–0	1–3	1–1	0–2	2–0	2–1	0–4	0–2	0–1	1–1
Al-Faisaly	1–1	3–1		1–1	2–2	1–0	1–1	1–1	1–0	3–1	3–0	3–2
Al-Hussein	5–0	6–0	1–0		2–0	1–1	1–1	1–1	3–1	1–0	3–0	2–1
Al-Jazeera	2–1	6–2	0–1	1–1		2–3	2–0	1–0	1–2	4–2	3–3	2–1
Al-Ramtha	1–2	0–0	0–0	1–2	0–3		0–1	2–1	0–4	1–0	3–0	1–0
Al-Salt	2–0	1–2	1–1	0–2	1–0	3–2		0–0	0–2	4–0	1–0	2–1
Al-Sareeh	1–1	5–1	0–0	1–5	2–2	1–2	0–0		1–3	2–0	0–0	1–0
Al-Wehdat	2–1	3–2	1–1	1–0	3–0	1–1	2–1	4–1		2–0	3–1	1–1
Ma'an	1–2	3–2	0–0	1–4	0–0	1–1	1–0	3–2	0–2		1–3	0–1
Moghayer Al-Sarhan	0–0	1–2	1–4	1–2	0–1	0–4	0–1	0–1	1–1	2–1		0–2
Shabab Al-Ordon	2–0	1–3	1–1	1–4	1–0	0–0	0–4	2–1	0–2	3–1	5–1	

Legend: Blue = home team win; Yellow = draw; Red = away team win.

== Statistics ==
=== Top goalscorers ===
As of 28 April 2025

Rank	Player	Team	Goals
1	(Jordan) Mohannad Semreen	Al-Wehdat	18
2	(Jordan) Mohammad Aleikish	Al-Sareeh	14
3	(Jordan) Yousef Abu Jalboush	Al-Hussein	11
