= Talal Haji =

Saudi Arabian footballer (born 2007)

Personal information
- Full name: Talal Abubakr Abdullah Haji
- Date of birth: 16 September 2007 (age 19)
- Place of birth: Jeddah, Saudi Arabia
- Height: 1.77 m (5 ft 10 in)
- Position: Forward

Team information
- Current team: Al-Ettifaq (on loan from Al-Ittihad)

Youth career
- Al-Ittihad

Senior career*
Years	Team	Apps	(Gls)
2023–	Al-Ittihad	11	(2)
2025	→ Al-Riyadh (loan)	10	(1)
2025–2026	→ Al-Riyadh (loan)	5	(0)
2026–	→ Al-Ettifaq (loan)	0	(0)

International career^{‡}
2022–	Saudi Arabia U17	13	(13)
2024–	Saudi Arabia U20		
2023–	Saudi Arabia U23		
2024–	Saudi Arabia	1	(0)
Medal record
Men's football
Representing Saudi Arabia
WAFF U-18 Championship
Winner	2024 Saudi Arabia
AFC U-20 Asian Cup
Runner-up	2025 China
- * Club domestic league appearances and goals as of 6 February 2026 ‡ National team caps and goals as of 1 March 2025

Talal Abubakr Abdullah Haji (Arabic: طَلَال أَبُوبَكْر عَبْد الله حَاجِي; born 16 September 2007) is a Saudi Arabian professional footballer who plays as a forward for Saudi Pro League club Al-Ettifaq, on loan from Al-Ittihad.

== Early life ==
Haji was born in Jeddah.

== Club career ==
He came through the youth ranks of Al-Ittihad, considered one of the best youth products of the Saudi Arab football. In September 2023, aged 16, in the absence of first-choice striker Abderrazak Hamdallah, Haji was drafted in to the Al-Ittihad squad ahead of their Saudi Pro League fixture against Al-Okhdood, though he did not go on to feature in the match as he had not yet turned sixteen. He made his debut on 21 September, coming on as a late substitute for Romarinho in a 2–1 win against Al Fateh.

He thus became the youngest player to feature in the Saudi Pro League at sixteen years and five days old – breaking the record previously held by Abbas Al-Hassan from 2021.

On 8 January 2025, Haji joined Al-Riyadh on a six-month loan. On 10 September 2025, Haji joined Al-Riyadh on a one-year loan.

== International career ==
Haji was called up to the Saudi Arabia national under-17 football team for the 2022 Arab Cup U-17 in Algeria. Having scored hat-tricks in consecutive games against Lebanon and Iraq, Haji missed a penalty in the semi-final shoot-out, which Saudi Arabia lost 5–4 to eventual champions Algeria. For his goal-scoring exploits, including an additional group-stage goal against Syria, Haji was named as the tournament's top scorer with seven goals.

He was called up to the squad again for the 2023 AFC U-17 Asian Cup, and after failing to score in Saudi Arabia's opening group-stage game against Australia, he scored twice in the following game, a 2–0 win against Tajikistan, earning a Man of the Match award from the Asian Football Confederation.

In January 2024, following the suspension of three players in the Saudi Arabia national team due to disciplinary reasons, Haji was additionally added to the squad for the 2023 AFC Asian Cup, thus became the youngest player in the history to feature in the competition at 16 years old and 118 days. He made his international debut on 25 January 2024 in the group stage game against Thailand. He became the youngest player to appear in the AFC Asian Cup history at the age of 16 years 4 months and 9 days.

== Career statistics ==
As of 27 September 2023

Appearances and goals by club, season and competition
Club	Season	League			King's Cup		Continental		Other		Total	
Club	Season	Division	Apps	Goals	Apps	Goals	Apps	Goals	Apps	Goals	Apps	Goals
Al-Ittihad	2023–24	Saudi Pro League	9	2	1	0	1 (Note: Appearance in AFC Champions League)	0	0	0	11	2
Career total			9	2	1	0	1	0	0	0	11	2
