= Ahmad Abu Shaireh =

Jordanian footballer

Personal information
- Full name: Ahmad Alhareth Tha'er Mahmoud Abu Sha'ireh
- Date of birth: 29 February 2000 (age 26)
- Place of birth: Amman, Jordan
- Height: 1.74 m (5 ft 9 in)
- Position: Winger

Team information
- Current team: Al-Baqa'a

Youth career
- –2018: Al-Jazeera

Senior career*
Years	Team	Apps	(Gls)
2018–2026	Al-Jazeera		
2023–2024	→Al-Faisaly (loan)		
2025	→Al-Wehdat (loan)	0	(0)
2026–	Al-Baqa'a	0	(0)

International career^{‡}
2018	Jordan U16		(0)
2020–2022	Jordan U23	2	(0)
- * Club domestic league appearances and goals as of 25 July 2026 ‡ National team caps and goals as of 9 January 2025

Ahmad Alhareth Tha'er Mahmoud Abu Sha'ireh (Arabic: أحمد الحارث ثائر محمود أبو شعيرة; born 29 February 2000) is a Jordanian professional footballer who plays as a winger for Jordanian Pro League club Al-Baqa'a.

== Club career ==
=== Al-Jazeera ===
He began his professional career with Al-Jazeera and went through all the youth ranks.

==== Al-Faisaly (loan) ====
On 16 January 2023, Abu Shaireh joined Al-Faisaly for a season-long loan.

==== Al-Wehdat (loan) ====
On 26 January 2025, Abu Shaireh joined Al-Wehdat on a short-loan deal. He would replace Mohannad Semreen, who was out of Al-Wehdat's squad for a period of 4-6 weeks. However, he would get injured during the second leg of the 2024 Jordan Super Cup against Al-Hussein, suffering a cut in the anterior cruciate ligament as a result. He would have a successful operation without any complications.

== International career ==
On 3 January 2025, Abu Shaireh received a call up to the Jordan national football team for a training camp held in Amman.

== Playing style ==
Abu Shaira is characterized by his high skills, speed and ability to penetrate from the edges of the stadium.

== Honours ==
Al-Faisaly

- Jordan FA Shield: 2023

Al-Wehdat

- Jordan FA Cup: 2024–25
