= Khaldoon Sabra =

Jordanian footballer born in 2004

Personal information
- Full name: Khaldoon Mohammad Abdallah Sabra
- Date of birth: 5 July 2004 (age 22)
- Place of birth: Jordan
- Height: 1.91 m (6 ft 3 in)
- Position: Striker

Team information
- Current team: Shabab Al-Ordon

Youth career
- –2024: Al-Jazeera

Senior career*
Years	Team	Apps	(Gls)
2024–2025	Al-Jazeera	11	(0)
2025–2026	Al-Hussein	6	(1)
2026–	Shabab Al-Ordon	0	(0)

International career^{‡}
2025–	Jordan U23	4	(1)
- * Club domestic league appearances and goals as of 10 August 2026 ‡ National team caps and goals as of 16 January 2026

Khaldoon Mohammad Abdallah Sabra (Arabic: خلدون صبرة; born 5 July 2004) is a Jordanian professional footballer who plays as a striker for Jordanian Pro League club Shabab Al-Ordon.

== Club career ==
=== Al-Jazeera ===
Khaldoon began his professional career at Al-Jazeera, scoring his first goal at the club during a preseason matchup against Al-Salt.

=== Al-Hussein ===
On 11 August 2025, Khaldoon joined Al-Hussein on a three-year contract. Khaldoon scored his first goal for the club during a 2025 Jordan Shield Cup matchup against Al-Sarhan. On 25 September 2025, Khaldoon scored his first league goal for Al-Hussein in a 5–0 victory over Al-Baqa'a.

== International career ==
On 14 July 2022, Khaldoon received his first youth national team call-up for the Jordan national under-20 football team, to participate in the 2022 Arab Cup U-20.

Khaldoon received his first call-up to the Jordan national under-23 football team, making his debut against the United Arab Emirates. On 13 October 2025, Khaldoon scored his first goal at the under-23 level against the United Arab Emirates. On 23 December 2025, Khaldoon was called up to the under-23 team once again for the 2026 AFC U-23 Asian Cup, participating in two of the four matches.

== Personal life ==
Khaldoon is the older brother of Jordanian international footballer Ibrahim Sabra.
