= Abdulrahman Al-Zaghaiba =

Jordanian footballer (born 2007)

Abdul-Rahman Al-Zaghaiba
Personal information
- Full name: Abdulrahman Ra'ed Mousa Al-Zaghaiba
- Date of birth: 10 April 2007 (age 19)
- Place of birth: Ar-Ramtha, Jordan
- Position: Striker

Team information
- Current team: Al-Jazeera
- Number: 9

Youth career
- Kufrsoum
- –2024: Shabab Al-Aqaba

Senior career*
Years	Team	Apps	(Gls)
2024–2025	Shabab Al-Aqaba	18	(0)
2025	Al-Ramtha	0	(0)
2025–	Al-Jazeera	4	(0)

International career^{‡}
2024–	Jordan U20		
2025–	Jordan U23	3	(0)
- * Club domestic league appearances and goals as of 7 May 2026 ‡ National team caps and goals as of 22 March 2025

Abdulrahman Ra'ed Mousa Al-Zaghaiba (Arabic: عبدالرحمن الزغايبه; born 10 April 2007) is a Jordanian professional footballer who plays as a striker for Jordanian Pro League club Al-Jazeera.

== Club career ==
=== Early career ===
Al-Zaghaiba began his career at Kufrsoum, leading the club to the Elite League during his time at the club. He then joined Shabab Al-Aqaba's youth academy, being a part of their under-17 and under-19 squads, before joining their senior side. He also went on trial at Cardiff City on late-July 2024.

=== Shabab Al-Aqaba ===
He began his senior career with Shabab Al-Aqaba during the 2024–25 Jordanian Pro League season, where he made 18 league appearances for the club.

=== Al-Ramtha ===
On 26 June 2025, Al-Zaghaiba joined Al-Ramtha on a four-season contract. He primarily participated with the club's reserve team and made no league appearances during his time there.

=== Al-Jazeera ===
On 8 December 2025, Al-Zaghaiba joined Al-Jazeera for an undisclosed period.

== International career ==
Al-Zaghaiba is a youth international for Jordan, having first represented the Jordanian under-20 team for a training camp held in Antalya.

On 16 March 2025, Al-Zaghaiba was called up to the Jordan under-23 team for the 2025 WAFF U-23 Championship held in Oman, where his team finished as runners-up. He started in a friendly in a 1–1 draw against the United Arab Emirates, which would ultimately be his last call-up with that cycle of players.

On 9 February 2026, Al-Zaghaiba was reintroduced to the under-20 team to participate in a set of friendly matches against Singapore.
