= Omar Ghanajoq =

Jordanian footballer (born 2005)

Personal information
- Full name: Omar Khader Ghanajoq
- Date of birth: 18 October 2005 (age 21)
- Place of birth: Amman, Jordan
- Height: 1.82 m (6 ft 0 in)
- Position: Winger

Team information
- Current team: Al-Hussein (on loan from Al-Ahli)
- Number: 77

Youth career
- –2024: Al-Ahli

Senior career*
Years	Team	Apps	(Gls)
2024–	Al-Ahli	35	(4)
2026–	→ Al-Hussein (loan)	0	(0)

International career^{‡}
2024–2025	Jordan U20	9	(2)
2026–	Jordan U23	1	(0)
- * Club domestic league appearances and goals as of 15 July 2026 ‡ National team caps and goals as of 29 March 2026

Omar Khader Ghanajoq (Arabic: عُمر خَضِر غُنةجق; born 18 October 2005), also known simply as Omar Khader, is a Jordanian professional footballer who plays as a winger for Jordanian Pro League club Al-Hussein, on loan from Al-Ahli.

== Club career ==
=== Al-Ahli ===
Ghanajoq began his career at Al-Ahli.

During the 2024–25 Jordan FA Cup, Ghanajoq would score the decisive goal against Shabab Al-Ordon to lead his club to the semi-finals of the competition. On 7 January 2025, Al-Ahli announced the renewal of Khader on an extended three-year contract.

=== Al-Hussein ===
On 15 July 2026, Ghanajoq joined defending champions Al-Hussein for an undisclosed fee.

== International career ==
Ghanajoq is a youth international for Jordan, beginning his international career with the Jordan national under-20 football team in 2024. On 18 January 2025, he would get called up to the team for the U20 Challenge Series and the 2025 AFC U-20 Asian Cup.

== Style of play ==
Ghanajoq primarily plays as a left-winger, relying on his skills and the ability to evade within the narrow spaces as well as his physical strength that enhances his danger.
