= Mohammad Al-Baytar =

Jordanian footballer (born 2007)

Personal information
- Full name: Mohammad Al-Baytar
- Date of birth: 13 July 2007 (age 19)
- Place of birth: Jordan
- Positions: Left-back; midfielder

Team information
- Current team: Al-Ramtha

Youth career
- –2025: Al-Ramtha

Senior career*
| Years | Team | Apps | (Gls) |
| 2025– | Al-Ramtha | 28 | (0) |

International career^{‡}
| 2025– | Jordan U20 | 2 | (0) |
- * Club domestic league appearances and goals as of 7 May 2026 ‡ National team caps and goals as of 15 November 2025

Mohammad Al-Baytar (Arabic: محمد البيطار; born 13 July 2007) is a Jordanian professional footballer who plays as a left-back for Jordanian Pro League club Al-Ramtha. He can also play as a midfielder.

== Club career ==
=== Al-Ramtha ===
Al-Baytar began his senior career at Al-Ramtha during the 2024–25 Jordanian Pro League season, where he debuted against Al-Jazeera. The following season, Baytar mainly appeared for the club on the bench. He did showcase his impact during the 2025 Jordan Shield Cup, where he scored two goals in the competition.

== International career ==
Al-Baytar is a youth international for Jordan, having first represented the under-20 team to participate in a set of friendly matches against Russia.
