= Ibrahim Sabra =

Jordanian footballer (born 2006)

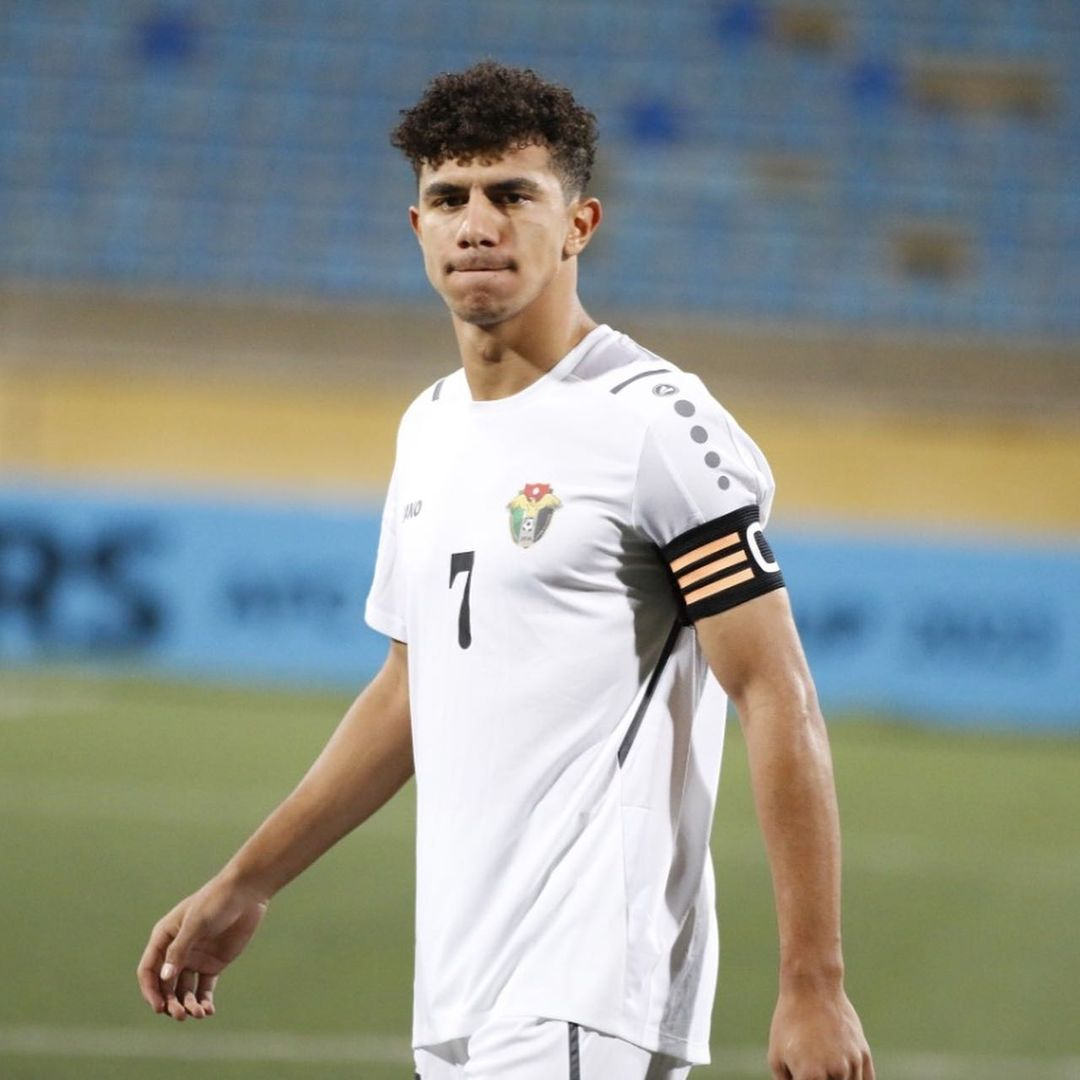
- Sabra with Jordan U17 in 2022

Personal information
- Full name: Ibrahim Mohammad Abdallah Sabra
- Date of birth: 1 February 2006 (age 20)
- Place of birth: Sahab, Jordan
- Height: 1.83 m (6 ft 0 in)
- Position: Striker

Team information
- Current team: Göztepe

Youth career
- –2019: Jordan Knights
- 2019–2023: Al-Wehdat

Senior career*
Years	Team	Apps	(Gls)
2023–2025	Al-Wehdat	21	(9)
2025–	Göztepe	9	(1)
2026	→ Lokomotiva Zagreb (loan)	13	(2)

International career^{‡}
2020–2023	Jordan U17		
2024	Jordan U19	4	(5)
2024–	Jordan U20	2	(2)
2024–	Jordan U23	4	(3)
2024–	Jordan	4	(1)
- * Club domestic league appearances and goals as of 15 June 2026 ‡ National team caps and goals as of 27 March 2026

Ibrahim Mohammad Abdallah Sabra (Arabic: إِبْرَاهِيم مُحَمَّد عَبْد الله صَبْرَة; born 1 February 2006) is a Jordanian professional footballer who plays as a striker for Süper Lig club Göztepe and the Jordan national team.

== Club career ==
=== Early career ===
Born in Sahab, Sabra is a youth product of Jordan Knights and later Al-Wehdat. During his youth days at Al-Wehdat, Sabra traveled to Dubai to trial with Shabab Al Ahli. However, that travel was not conducted with his club's permission, who had an ongoing youth championship. As a result, he got suspended by the club for a 6-month period. However, Al-Wehdat decided to lift Sabra's suspension period on 24 October 2022, after his father submitted an official letter of apology to the club.

=== Al-Wehdat ===
On 29 December 2022, Ibrahim Sabra was promoted to Al-Wehdat's senior team. On 24 May 2023, Sabra signed a professional contract with Al-Wehdat, for an undisclosed period.

Sabra established himself as the main striker for Al-Wehdat towards the end of the 2023-24 Jordanian Pro League, putting his signature after scoring his first official goals against Sahab.

=== Göztepe ===
On 30 June 2025, Süper Lig club Göztepe signed a 4+1 year contract with Sabra. On 19 September 2025, Sabra scored his first league goal for Göztepe against Big Three giants Beşiktaş. He did so after 39 seconds of his substitution with a bicycle kick and the ball going past goalkeeper Mert Günok.

==== Lokomotiva Zagreb (loan) ====
On 16 February 2026, Sabra joined HNL club Lokomotiva Zagreb, on loan from Göztepe until the end of the season. He made his debut and also received his first start for the club on 21 February in a 3–1 win against Osijek. He scored his first goal on 7 March in a 1–1 draw against Varaždin. He then scored another league goal the following week against Hajduk Split in a 2–1 loss.

== International career ==
Sabra is a youth international for Jordan, having first represented the Jordanian under-17 team. He got his hands at silverware in 2022, as a result of winning the 2022 WAFF U-16 Championship.

He also represented the under-20 in 2023, where he participated in a youth camp between October 8 and 17, in the Turkish city of Antalya. On 10 April 2024, Sabra was called up to the under-23 to participate in the 2024 AFC U-23 Asian Cup held in Qatar.

Sabra established his prowess for the under-19, where he scored 5 goals in 4 appearances, during the 2024 WAFF U-19 Championship.

On 24 August 2024, Ibrahim Sabra was called up to the preliminary roster of the Jordan national football team. It was noted that Ibrahim Sabra had a distinguished performance against North Korea as a substitute during their second meeting, as he had created several opportunities during his time in the unofficial friendly match. On 3 September 2025, Sabra scored a hat-trick for the under-23 squad in a 11–0 win against Bhutan during the 2026 AFC U-23 Asian Cup qualification.

On 27 March 2026, Sabra scored his first senior national team goal against Costa Rica, a minute after appearing as a substitute at the 76' mark.

On 2 June 2026, Sabra was selected in the 26-man squad for the 2026 FIFA World Cup. Three days later, he was ruled out of the tournament after sustaining an ankle injury.

== Playing style ==
Sabra is known for his scoring prowess, in combination with his strong physique and rapid speed. He can also shoot powerfully from a standing position, as well as find good positions to be in as a striker, drawing comparisons to a 90s legend from Al-Wehdat: Jihad Abdul-Munam.

== Personal life ==
Ibrahim is the younger brother of Al-Hussein and Jordan under-23 international footballer Khaldoon Sabra.

Sabra is also known to be a multi-talented athlete. He had participated in a national athletics championship race in 2023, where he won first place in the 100 metre race, with a time of 11.44. He also won the 200 meters that same race week. He was met with the decision to pursue an athletics or footballing career, after the Jordanian athletics team called for his services, which he ended up pursuing football.

== Career statistics ==
=== Club ===
As of 26 May 2026

Appearances and goals by club, season and competition
Club	Season	League			Cup (Note: Includes Jordan FA Cup and Croatian Football Cup.)		League Cup (Note: Includes Jordan Shield Cup.)		Continental (Note: Includes AFC Champions League Elite and AFC Champions League Two.)		Total	
Club	Season	Division	Apps	Goals	Apps	Goals	Apps	Goals	Apps	Goals	Apps	Goals
Al-Wehdat	2023–24	Jordanian Pro League	8	1	5	1	4	0	4	2	21	4
Al-Wehdat	2024–25	Jordanian Pro League	13	8	5	3	4	2	6	3	28	16
Al-Wehdat	Total		21	9	10	4	8	2	10	5	49	20
Göztepe	2025–26	Süper Lig	9	1	—		—		—		9	1
Lokomotiva Zagreb (loan)	2025–26	HNL	13	2	1	0	—		—		14	2
Lokomotiva Zagreb (loan)	Total		20	3	1	0	0	0	0	0	25	3
Career total			41	12	11	4	8	2	10	5	74	23

=== International ===
As of match played 31 March 2026

Appearances and goals by national team and year
National team	Year	Apps	Goals
Jordan	2025	3	0
Jordan	2026	2	1
Total		5	1

Scores and results list Jordan's goal tally first.

List of international goals scored by Ibrahim Sabra
No.	Date	Venue	Cap	Opponent	Score	Result	Competition
1.	27 March 2026	Mardan Sports Complex, Antalya, Turkey	4	Costa Rica	2–0	2–2	2026 Jordan International Tournament

== Honours ==
Al-Wehdat

- Jordan FA Cup: 2023–24, 2024–25

Jordan U16

- WAFF U-16 Championship: 2022
