= 2024 WAFF U-19 Championship =

بطولة الديار العربية غرب آسيا للشباب السعودية 2024

Tournament details
- Host country: Saudi Arabia
- City: Taif
- Dates: 25 June – 5 July
- Teams: 12 (from 2 confederations)
- Venue: 2 (in 1 host city)

Final positions
- Champions: Saudi Arabia (1st title)
- Runners-up: United Arab Emirates

Tournament statistics
- Matches played: 21
- Goals scored: 55 (2.62 per match)
- Top scorer: (United Arab Emirates) Mohammed Al-Mansoori ( 4 goals )

The 2024 WAFF U-19 Championship, also known as 2024 Al-Dyar Al-Arbiya WAFF U-19 Championship (Arabic: بطولة الديار العربية غرب آسيا للشباب) for sponsorship reasons, was the third edition of the WAFF U-19 Championship, the international youth football championship organised by West Asian Football Federation for the men's under-19 national teams of West Asia. Saudi Arabia is hosting the tournament in Taif from 25 June to 5 July 2024. A total of twelve teams played in the tournament, with players born on or after 1 January 2005 eligible to participate.

Iraq were the two-time defending champions, having won the title in every edition so far.

== Participating teams ==
11 (out of 12) WAFF member nations competed in the tournament. Albania was invited to participate as a guest nation.

Team	Appearance	Last appearance	Previous best performance
Albania	1st	Debut	
Bahrain	3rd	2021 (Group stage)	Group stage (2019, 2021)
Iraq	3rd	2021 (Champions)	Champions (2019, 2021)
Jordan	3rd	2021 (Group stage)	Third place (2019)
Kuwait	2nd	2021 (Group stage)	Group stage (2021)
Lebanon	2nd	2021 (Runners-up)	Runners-up (2021)
Oman	1st	Debut	
Palestine	3rd	2021 (Group stage)	Fourth place (2019)
Saudi Arabia	1st	Debut	
Syria	2nd	2021 (Group stage)	Group stage (2021)
United Arab Emirates	3rd	2021 (Group stage)	Runners-up (2019)
Yemen	2nd	2021 (Group stage)	Group stage (2021)

Did not enter

- Qatar

=== Draw ===
The draw was held on 18 June 2024 at the Federation's headquarters.

== Match officials ==
Referees

- (Bahrain) Mohammed Al-Dalawar
- (Iraq) Ali Hussein
- (Saudi Arabia) Abdullah Al-Shehri
- (Syria) Shadi Al-Shahf
- (United Arab Emirates) Mohammed Al-Harmoudi
- (Yemen) Mukhtar Al-Arami
- (Yemen) Khaled Basaleh

Assistant referees

- (Bahrain) Hussein Mohammed Jaafar
- (Iraq) Karrar Abbas
- (Saudi Arabia) Ibrahim Al-Dakhil
- (United Arab Emirates) Mohammed Al-Mazmi
- (Yemen) Fahd Al-Bujairi

== Group stage ==
The times are according to Arabia Standard Time (UTC+3).

=== Group A ===
Pos	Team	Pld	W	D	L	GF	GA	GD	Pts	Qualification
1	Saudi Arabia (H)	3	1	2	0	6	3	+3	5	Knockout stage
2	Yemen	3	1	2	0	6	4	+2	5	
3	Oman	3	1	1	1	4	5	−1	4	
4	Kuwait	3	0	1	2	2	6	−4	1	

Source: WAFF
Rules for classification: Group stage tiebreakers
(H) Hosts
25 June 2024
17:00

Oman	2–1	Kuwait
Al Saadi 44'; Al Masroori 47'	Report (WAFF)	M. Suleiman 33' (pen.)

King Fahd Sports City Stadium, Taif
25 June 2024
21:00

Saudi Arabia	2–2	Yemen
R. Al-Ghamdi 36'; Hazazi 64'	Report (WAFF)	Al-Brwani 40'; Aman 84' (o.g.)

King Fahd Sports City Stadium, Taif

27 June 2024
17:00

Yemen	3–1	Oman
Masnom 5', 65'; Radman 46' (pen.)	Report (WAFF)	Al Masroori 10'

King Fahd Sports City Stadium, Taif
27 June 2024
21:00

Kuwait	0–3	Saudi Arabia
	Report (WAFF)	Haqawi 33'; Haji 37', 45+1'

King Fahd Sports City Stadium, Taif

29 June 2024
21:00

Kuwait	1–1	Yemen
Al-Shammari 25'	Report (WAFF)	Masnom 29'

Okaz Club Stadium, Taif
Referee: Ali Hussein (Iraq)
29 June 2024
21:00

Saudi Arabia	1–1	Oman
Al-Shamrani 15'	Report (WAFF)	Al Shabibi 89'

King Fahd Sports City Stadium, Taif

=== Group B ===
Pos	Team	Pld	W	D	L	GF	GA	GD	Pts	Qualification
1	Jordan	3	2	1	0	5	0	+5	7	Knockout stage
2	Iraq	3	1	2	0	3	1	+2	5	
3	Albania	3	1	1	1	3	4	−1	4	
4	Lebanon	3	0	0	3	0	6	−6	0	

Source: WAFF
Rules for classification: Group stage tiebreakers
26 June 2024
17:00

Iraq	0–0	Jordan
	Report (JFA); Report (WAFF)

Okaz Club Stadium, Taif
26 June 2024
21:00

Lebanon	0–2	Albania
	Report (LFA); Report (FSHF); Report (WAFF)	Krasniqi 45+3'; Jaku 69'

Okaz Club Stadium, Taif

28 June 2024
17:00

Albania	1–1	Iraq
Sulejmani 69'	Report (FSHF); Report (WAFF)	H. Adnan 56'

Okaz Club Stadium, Taif
28 June 2024
21:00

Jordan	2–0	Lebanon
Sabra 31', 64'	Report (JFA); Report (LFA); Report (WAFF)

Okaz Club Stadium, Taif

30 June 2024
17:00

Jordan	3–0	Albania
Sabra 22', 76'; Al-Khob 90+2'	Report (JFA); Report (FSHF); Report (WAFF)

King Fahd Sports City Stadium, Taif
Referee: Mohammed Al-Harmoudi (United Arab Emirates)
30 June 2024
17:00

Lebanon	0–2	Iraq
	Report (WAFF)	Jaafar 45'; Nori 69'

Okaz Club Stadium, Taif
Referee: Abdullah Al-Shehri (Saudi Arabia)

=== Group C ===
Pos	Team	Pld	W	D	L	GF	GA	GD	Pts	Qualification
1	United Arab Emirates	3	2	0	1	6	2	+4	6	Knockout stage
2	Syria	3	2	0	1	7	6	+1	6	Knockout stage
3	Palestine	3	1	1	1	4	5	−1	4	
4	Bahrain	3	0	1	2	3	7	−4	1	

Source: WAFF
Rules for classification: Group stage tiebreakers
26 June 2024
17:00

Bahrain	1–3	United Arab Emirates
Al-Isa 36'	Report (UAEFA); Report (WAFF)	Al-Mansoori 38', 47'; Bader 45'

King Fahd Sports City Stadium, Taif
26 June 2024
21:00

Syria	4–2	Palestine
Ramadan 17', 57'; Al-Omar 90+1'; Dahan 90+4'	Report (PFA); Report (WAFF)	Badran 5'; Daraghmeh 42'

King Fahd Sports City Stadium, Taif

28 June 2024
17:00

Palestine	1–1	Bahrain
S. Ali 31'	Report (PFA); Report (WAFF)	S. Awdi 61'

King Fahd Sports City Stadium, Taif
Referee: Khaled Basaleh (Yemen)
28 June 2024
21:00

United Arab Emirates	3–0	Syria
H. Abbas 21'; Al-Mansoori 27'; Al-Hammadi 73'	Report (UAEFA); Report (WAFF)

King Fahd Sports City Stadium, Taif

30 June 2024
21:00

United Arab Emirates	0–1	Palestine
	Report (UAEFA); Report (PFA); Report (WAFF)	Daraghmeh 73'

King Fahd Sports City Stadium, Taif
Referee: Sami Al-Jurais (Saudi Arabia)
30 June 2024
21:00

Syria	3–1	Bahrain
Dahan 45+3'; Mustafa 54', 83'	Report (WAFF)	Ali 69'

Okaz Club Stadium, Taif

=== Ranking of best runners-up ===
Pos	Grp	Team	Pld	W	D	L	GF	GA	GD	Pts	Qualification
1	C	Syria	3	2	0	1	7	6	+1	6	Knockout stage
2	A	Yemen	3	1	2	0	6	4	+2	5	
3	B	Iraq	3	1	2	0	3	1	+2	5	

Source: WAFF

== Knockout stage ==
=== Semi-finals ===
3 July 2024
17:00

Jordan	1–2	United Arab Emirates
Sabra 45'	Report (JFA); Report (WAFF)	Al-Hammadi 57'; Al-Mansoori 78'

King Fahd Sports City Stadium, Taif
3 July 2024
21:00

Saudi Arabia	2–0	Syria
S. Harun 35'; Haqawi 50'	Report (WAFF)

King Fahd Sports City Stadium, Taif

=== Final ===
5 July 2024
21:00

United Arab Emirates	0–1	Saudi Arabia
		Talal Haji 43'

King Fahd Sports City Stadium, Taif

== Goalscorers ==
There were 35 goals scored in 12 matches, for an average of 2.92 goals per match.

4 goals

- (United Arab Emirates) Mohammed Al-Mansoori

3 goals

- (Yemen) Abdulaziz Masnom
- (Saudi Arabia) Talal Haji
- (Jordan) Ibrahim Sabra

2 goals

- (Oman) Ghassan Al Masroori
- (Syria) Zakaria Ramadan
- (United Arab Emirates) Eid Al-Hammadi

1 goal

- (Albania) Erald Krasniqi
- (Albania) Jordi Jaku
- (Albania) Flavio Sulejmani
- (Bahrain) Isa Al-Isa
- (Bahrain) Sami Awdi
- (Iraq) Hussein Fahim Adnan
- (Kuwait) Montaser Suleiman
- (Oman) Muhannad Al Saadi
- (Palestine) Ahmad Badran
- (Palestine) Aysam Daraghmeh
- (Palestine) Suhaib Ali
- (Saudi Arabia) Rakan Al-Ghamdi
- (Saudi Arabia) Bassam Hazazi
- (Saudi Arabia) Saad Haqawi
- (Syria) Mahmoud Al-Omar
- (Syria) Anas Dahan
- (United Arab Emirates) Ghaith Bader
- (United Arab Emirates) Hazem Abbas
- (Yemen) Mohammad Al-Brwani
- (Yemen) Essam Radman

1 own goal

- (Saudi Arabia) Awad Aman (against Yemen)
