= Ali Kassas =

Lebanese footballer (born 2003)

Personal information
- Full name: Ali Mohamad Kassas
- Date of birth: 25 May 2003 (age 23)
- Place of birth: Younine, Lebanon
- Height: 1.80 m (5 ft 11 in)
- Position: Forward

Team information
- Current team: Nejmeh
- Number: 11

Youth career
- –2016: Classico Academy
- 2016–2021: Nejmeh

Senior career*
Years	Team	Apps	(Gls)
2021–2023	Nejmeh	5	(0)
2022	→ AC Sporting (loan)	3	(0)
2023–2024	Bourj	22	(5)
2024–2025	Safa	25	(8)
2025–	Nejmeh	25	(12)

International career^{‡}
2021	Lebanon U18		(0)
2021–2022	Lebanon U20		(7)
2023–2026	Lebanon U23	10	(0)
2024–	Lebanon	14	(3)
Medal record
Men's football
Representing Lebanon
WAFF U-18 Championship
Silver medal – second place	2021	U-18 Team
- * Club domestic league appearances and goals as of 10:21, 3 August 2026 (UTC) ‡ National team caps and goals as of 17 November 2026

Ali Mohamad Kassas (Arabic: علي محمد قصاص; born 25 May 2003) is a Lebanese footballer who plays as a forward for Lebanese Premier League club Nejmeh and the Lebanon national team.

== Club career ==
=== Nejmeh and loan to AC Sporting ===
Kassas began his youth career at Classico Academy. He joined Nejmeh's youth setup in 2016, and was crowned top scorer of the U18 league with 29 goals in 2021. He made his senior debut for Nejmeh on 29 April 2021, coming on as a substitute against Tripoli in the Lebanese FA Cup.

In February 2022, Kassas was loaned out to AC Sporting for the remainder of the 2021–22 season, in which he made three appearances in the league. He was released by Nejmeh in June 2023.

=== Bourj and Safa ===
Kassas signed for Bourj as a free agent in June 2023. He scored his first senior goal on 27 October 2023, helping Bourj win 2–1 over Shabab Sahel. Kassas finished the 2023–24 season with five goals in 22 league appearances.

In June 2024, Kassas signed a three-year deal with Safa. He made an immediate impact for Safa, scoring in the fourth minute of his league debut in a 4–1 victory over Racing Beirut on 21 September. On 25 February 2025, he scored a stoppage time goal in a 3–0 win over Sagesse, taking Safa to second place in the league. Kassas finished the 2024–25 season with eight goals in 25 appearances.

=== Return to Nejmeh ===
In August 2025, Kassas returned to Nejmeh ahead of the 2025–26 season. With 12 goals in the league, Kassas was the second-highest goalscorer and the best-scoring Lebanese player of the season. He renewed his contract with Nejmeh in August 2026.

== International career ==
=== Youth ===
Kassas represented Lebanon at the under-18 team at the 2021 WAFF U-18 Championship in Iraq, where Lebanon finished runners-up. He was subsequently selected for the under-20 team for the 2021 Arab Cup U-20, where he started against Senegal and scored in a 3–1 defeat to Comoros. He later represented the under-20 team in the 2023 AFC U-20 Asian Cup qualification, scoring a hat-trick in a 6–1 victory over Singapore on 18 September 2022.

Kassas subsequently progressed to the under-23 team. He was selected for two friendly matches against Indonesia in April 2023, and scored in a 3–2 friendly victory over Syria on 3 June. He represented Lebanon at the 2023 WAFF U-23 Championship. He was selected for the 2026 AFC U-23 Asian Cup qualification, contributing to Lebanon's first-ever qualification for the final tournament. Kassas was included in Lebanon's squad for the 2026 AFC U-23 Asian Cup in Saudi Arabia. He started all three of Lebanon's group-stage matches.

=== Senior ===
Kassas was first called up to the Lebanon national team in December 2024 for two friendly matches against Kuwait. He made his first start for the national team and scored in the fourth minute of a 2–0 friendly victory over Kuwait on 15 December, his first international goal. On 1 October 2026, Kassas scored a brace in a 6–0 friendly win against the Maldives.

== Personal life ==
Kassas's father, Mohammad, was also a footballer.

== Career statistics ==
=== Club ===
As of match played 2 August 2026

Appearances and goals by club, season and competition
Club	Season	League			Lebanon Cup		League cup (Note: Includes Lebanese Elite Cup, Lebanese Federation Cup)		Other		Total	
Club	Season	Division	Apps	Goals	Apps	Goals	Apps	Goals	Apps	Goals	Apps	Goals
Nejmeh	2020–21	Lebanese Premier League	0	0	1	0	—		—		1	0
Nejmeh	2021–22	Lebanese Premier League	0	0	0	0	3	0	—		3	0
Nejmeh	2022–23	Lebanese Premier League	5	0	1	0	1	0	—		7	0
Nejmeh	Total		5	0	2	0	4	0	0	0	11	0
AC Sporting (loan)	2021–22	Lebanese Premier League	3	0	0	0	0	0	—		3	0
Bourj	2023–24	Lebanese Premier League	22	5	1	0	0	0	—		23	5
Safa	2024–25	Lebanese Premier League	25	8	—		—		—		25	8
Nejmeh	2025–26	Lebanese Premier League	25	12	3	1	—		3 (Note: Appearances in National Solidarity Tournament)	2	31	15
Nejmeh	2026–27	Lebanese Premier League	0	0	0	0	0	0	—		0	0
Nejmeh	Total		25	12	3	1	0	0	3	2	31	15
Career total			80	25	6	1	4	0	3	2	93	28

=== International ===
As of match played 17 November 2026

Appearances and goals by national team and year
National team	Year	Apps	Goals
Lebanon	2024	2	1
Lebanon	2025	8	0
Lebanon	2026	4	2
Total		14	3

Scores and results list Lebanon's goal tally first, score column indicates score after each Kassas goal.

List of international goals scored by Ali Kassas
No.	Date	Venue	Opponent	Score	Result	Competition
1	15 December 2024	Suheim bin Hamad Stadium, Doha, Qatar	Kuwait	1–0	2–0	Friendly
2	1 October 2026	Dolen Omurzakov Stadium, Bishkek, Kyrgyzstan	Maldives	5–0	6–0	Friendly
3	1 October 2026	Dolen Omurzakov Stadium, Bishkek, Kyrgyzstan	Maldives	6–0	6–0	Friendly

== Honours ==
Nejmeh

- Lebanese FA Cup: 2022–23, 2025–26

Lebanon U18

- WAFF U-18 Championship runner-up: 2021

== See also ==
- List of association football families
