= 2025 U-20 Challenge Series =

Upcoming international football competition in Sidoarjo, Indonesia

2025 U20 Challenge Series
Tournament details
- Host country: Indonesia
- Dates: 24–30 January
- Teams: 4 (from 1 confederation)
- Venue: 1 (in 1 host city)

Final positions
- Champions: Syria (1st title)
- Runners-up: Jordan
- Third place: Indonesia
- Fourth place: India

Tournament statistics
- Matches played: 6
- Goals scored: 22 (3.67 per match)
- Attendance: 12,195 (2,033 per match)
- Top scorer(s): (Syria) Anas Dahhan (4 goals)

The 2025 U20 Challenge Series, officially the Mandiri U20 Challenge Series 2025 for sponsorship reasons, was the inaugural edition of the U20 Challenge Series, an invitational, age-restricted football tournament, hosted by Indonesia. The tournament featured four national under-20 teams from Asia and was held from 24 to 30 January 2025.

Syria won the inaugural tournament unbeaten.

== Teams ==
Four football associations from one confederation (AFC) confirmed their participation in the tournament.

Team	Region	App
Indonesia	AFF	1st
Jordan	WAFF	1st
India	SAFF	1st
Syria	WAFF	1st

== Venue ==
Sidoarjo
Gelora Delta Stadium
Capacity: 19,000
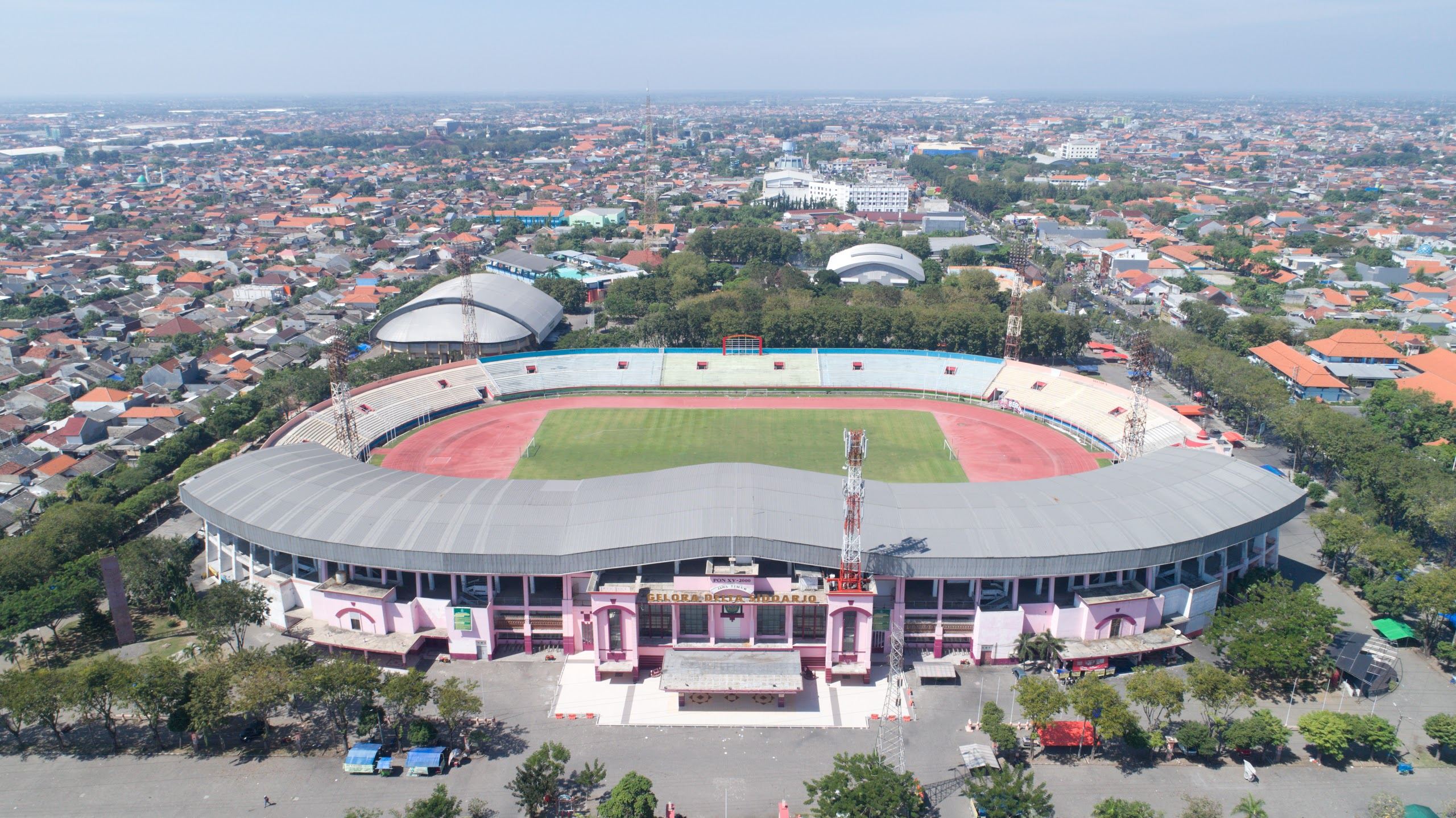

== Standings ==
Pos	Team	Pld	W	D	L	GF	GA	GD	Pts
1st place, gold medalist(s)	Syria (C)	3	3	0	0	10	2	+8	9
2nd place, silver medalist(s)	Jordan	3	2	0	1	7	2	+5	6
3rd place, bronze medalist(s)	Indonesia (H)	3	1	0	2	4	3	+1	3
4	India	3	0	0	3	1	15	−14	0

Source: PSSI
(C) Champions; (H) Hosts

== Matches ==
24 January 2025
16:00

India	1–6	Syria
Malngiang 64'	Report (AIFF)	Dahhan 4', 45+2'; Ramadan 15'; Al-Mahmoud 37'; H. Mahmoud 49', 63'

Gelora Delta Stadium, Sidoarjo
Attendance: 86
Referee: Thoriq Alkatiri (Indonesia)
24 January 2025
19:30

Indonesia	0–1	Jordan
		Sabra 4'

Gelora Delta Stadium, Sidoarjo
Attendance: 2,229
Referee: Tuan Yaasin (Malaysia)

27 January 2025
16:00

Jordan	5–0	India
Al-Fakhouri 45+1', 45+2'; Sabra 48'; Al-Maqableh 69'; Ghanajoq 90'	Report (AIFF)

Gelora Delta Stadium, Sidoarjo
Referee: Naufal Fairuski (Indonesia)
27 January 2025
19:30

Indonesia	0–2	Syria
		Ramadan 29'; Dahhan 66'

Gelora Delta Stadium, Sidoarjo
Attendance: 4,443
Referee: Clifford Daypuyat (Philippines)

30 January 2025
16:00

Syria	2–1	Jordan
Dahhan 72'; Al-Mustafa 90+2'	Report (JFA)	Deeb 18'

Gelora Delta Stadium, Sidoarjo
30 January 2025
19:30

Indonesia	4–0	India
Firmansyah 4'; Ragil 46', 60'; Gwijangge 76'	Report (AIFF)

Gelora Delta Stadium, Sidoarjo
Attendance: 5,437
Referee: Tuan Yaasin (Malaysia)

== Goalscorers ==
There were 22 goals scored in 6 matches, for an average of 3.67 goals per match.

4 goals

- (Syria) Anas Dahhan
- (India) Ethan Ghatge

2 goals

- (Indonesia) Muhammad Ragil
- (Jordan) Odeh Al-Fakhouri
- (Jordan) Ibrahim Sabra
- (Syria) Homam Mahmoud
- (Syria) Majd Ramadan

1 goal

- (India) Manbhakupar Malngiang
- (Indonesia) Toni Firmansyah
- (Indonesia) Iqbal Gwijangge
- (Jordan) Yousef Al-Maqableh
- (Jordan) Omar Ghanajoq
- (Jordan) Mahmoud Deeb
- (Syria) Hassan Al-Mahmoud
- (Syria) Mohammad Al-Mustafa

== Broadcasting ==
Country	Television	Live streaming
Indonesia	Indosiar	Vidio
Jordan	youtube.com/@PSSITV	
India	youtube.com/@PSSITV	
Syria	youtube.com/@PSSITV	
