= Kitab fi ma'rifat 'ilm ramy al-siham =

The Kitāb fī maʿrifat ʿilm ramy al-sihām (Arabic: كتاب في معرفة علم رمي السهام, lit. 'Book on the Lore and Discipline of Archery'), called the Maʿrifa for short, is an Arabic treatise on archery written by Ḥusayn al-Yūnīnī around 1320. It was intended for those entering the archers' guild in the Mamluk Sultanate. It is preserved in three manuscripts.

== Manuscripts ==
The known manuscripts of the Maʿrifa are:

- Dublin, Chester Beatty Library, MS 3158:1
- Gotha, Forschungsbibliothek, MS Orient. A 1340
- Leiden, Bibliothek der Rijksuniversiteit, MS Or. 955

In addition to these three, there is a fourth possible copy. There was a manuscript in Alexandria containing a work entitled al-Qaṣīda al-Yūnāniyya fī al-ramy ʿan al-qaws, which may be the Maʿrifa.

== Author ==
The author of the Maʿrifa was al-Ḥusayn ibn ʿAbd al-Raḥmān ibn Muḥammad ibn al-Shaykh ʿAbd Allāh ibn ʿUthmān ibn Abi al-Qasim ibn Muḥammad ibn Jaʿfar al-Yūnīnī Abu Muḥammad al-Baʿlī al-Rāmī. This is his name as it appears in Ibn Ḥajar's 14th-century biographical dictionary al-Durar al-kāmina. The nisba al-Yūnīnī, referring to the village of Yūnīn, is sometimes erroneously given as al-Yūnānī ('the Greek'). The nisba al-Baʿlī refers to Baalbek and the nickname al-Rāmī means 'the archer'.

According to Ibn Ḥajar, al-Yūnīnī was born around 1250. He was last seen alive on 10 September 1324 and was found dead a week later. He wrote the Maʿrifa when he was in his seventies. Besides the Maʿrifa, al-Yūnīnī wrote an urjūza (poem) on archery. It is found in two manuscripts: Aya Sofya MSS 2952 and 4051. It was written following an incident in Damascus in 1277 or 1278. Another urjūza on archery is attributed to him or to his son in the Leiden manuscript. It is entitled al-Masāʾil or al-Nihāya fī ʿilm al-rimāya. Both urjūzas include a commentary.

== Synopsis ==
The Maʿrifa is "a structured course of vocational training for entrants to, and members of ... the archers' guild." These were foot archers and the Maʿrifa has nothing to say about cavalry archery other than to note that it was practiced by the Mamluks. It describes the requirements of an archer each stage of his professional advancement from mubtadīʾ (novice), to rāmī (shooter), naqīb, wakīl and ustād (master).

The Maʿrifa is the earliest archery text to systematically describe which parts of the body should be in tension (almushaddadāt), relaxation (al-mulayyanāt) or stillness (al-sawākin) at every stage of shooting. This was an influential innovation picked up by all subsequent Islamic treatises on the subject.

Among the practices of the masters that the Maʿrifa mentions is the "art of penetration" (ʿilm al-ikhrāq), in which archers demonstrate their skill by shooting various types of arrowhead through various targets. For example, a challenge may involve putting a head made of hardened leather through a copper plate. Another form of practice was the "art of suspension" (ʿilm al-taʿalīq). In this challenge, an arrow with fragile attachments (such as empty eggshells) affixed to its shaft was shot into a ceiling without disturbing the attachments.

== Bibliography ==
- Jallon, Adnan Darwish (1980). Kitāb fī maʿrifat ʿilm ramy al-sihām: A Treatise on Archery by Ḥusayn b. ʿAbd al-Raḥmān b. Muḥammad b. ʿAbdallāh al-Yūnīnī [AH 647 (?) – 724 / AD 1249–50 (?) – 1324]. A Critical Edition of the Arabic Text together with a Study of the Work in English (PhD diss.). Victoria University of Manchester.
