= Football records and statistics in Jordan =

== Most Successful Teams ==
=== Successful Teams ===
Team	Total Number of Trophies	Jordan League Winners	FA Cup Winners	Shield Cup Winners	Super Cup Winners
Al-Faisaly	67	31 (1944, 1945, 1959, 1960, 1961, 1962, 1963, 1964, 1965, 1966, 1970, 1971, 1972, 1973, 1974, 1976, 1977, 1983, 1985, 1986, 1989, 1990, 1991, 1993, 1994, 1999, 2000, 2001, 2003, 2004, 2010)	16 (1981, 1983, 1988, 1990, 1992, 1993, 1994, 1995, 1998, 1999, 2001, 2002, 2003, 2004, 2005, 2008)	7 (1987, 1991, 1992, 1997, 2000, 2009, 2011)	13 (1981, 1982, 1984, 1986, 1987, 1991, 1993, 1994, 1995, 1996, 2002, 2004, 2006)
Al-Wihdat	40	12 (1980, 1987, 1991, 1995, 1996, 1996/97, 1997, 2005, 2007, 2008, 2009, 2011)	9 (1982, 1985, 1989, 1996, 1997, 2000, 2009, 2010, 2011)	8 (1982, 1983, 1988, 1995, 2002, 2004, 2008, 2009, 2010)	11 (1989, 1992, 1997, 1998, 2000, 2001, 2005, 2008, 2009, 2010, 2011)
Al Ramtha	11	2 (1981, 1982)	2 (1991, 1992)	5 (1989, 1990, 1993, 1996, 2001)	2 (1983, 1990)
Al Ahly Amman	8	8 (1947, 1949, 1950, 1951, 1954, 1975, 1978, 1979)			
Al-Jazira	7	3 (1952, 1955, 1956)	1 (1984)	2 (1981, 1986)	1 (1985)
Shabab Al-Ordon Al-Qadisiya	5	1 (2006)	2 (2006, 2007)	1 (2007)	1 (2007)
Al Hussein Irbid	4			3 (1994, 2003, 2005)	1 (2003)
Amman	1	1 (1984)			
Amman	1	1 (1946)			
Al Arabi Irbid	1		1 (1986)		
Kfarsoum	1			1 (1998)	
Al Yarmouk	1			1 (2006)	

== Top-Performing Clubs ==
=== Jordan League ===
Club	Number of Championships
Al-Faisaly (Amman)	31
Al Wahdat [includes Al-Deffatain]	12
Al Ahly Amman	8
Al-Jazira	3
Al Ramtha	2
Shabab Al Ordon Al Qadisiya	1
Amman	1
Jordan	1

=== FA Cup ===
Club	Number
Al-Faisaly (Amman)	16
Al Wahdat [includes Al-Deffatain]	9
Al Ramtha	2
Shabab Al Ordon Al Qadisiya	2
Al Jazira	1
Al Arabi Irbid	1

=== FA Shield ===
Club	Number
Al Wahdat [includes Al-Deffatain]	8
Al-Faisaly (Amman)	7
Al Ramtha	5
Al Hussein Irbid	3
Al Jazira	2
Kfarsoum	1
Shabab Al Ordon Al Qadisiya	1
Al Yarmouk Amman	1

=== Super Cup ===
Club	Number
Al-Faisaly (Amman)	13
Al Wahdat [includes Al-Deffatain]	11
Al Ramtha	2
Al Hussein Irbid	1
Al Jazira	1
Shabab Al Ordon Al Qadisiya	1
