= Tha'er Al-Dirabany =

Jordanian footballer

Personal information
- Full name: Thaer Ashraf Mousa Khaleel Al-Dirabany
- Date of birth: 5 April 2002 (age 24)
- Place of birth: Amman, Jordan
- Height: 1.76 m (5 ft 9 in)
- Position: Midfielder

Team information
- Current team: Al-Baqa'a

Youth career
- –2021: Al-Wehdat

Senior career*
Years	Team	Apps	(Gls)
2019–2022	Al-Wehdat		
2022–2026	Shabab Al-Ordon		
2026–	Al-Baqa'a	0	(0)

International career^{‡}
2018	Jordan U17	3	(0)
- * Club domestic league appearances and goals as of 3 May 2025 ‡ National team caps and goals as of 27 September 2018

Thaer Ashraf Mousa Khaleel Al-Dirabany (Arabic: ثائر أشرف موسى خليل الديرباني; born 5 April 2002) is a Jordanian professional footballer who plays as a midfielder for Jordanian Pro League club Al-Baqa'a.

== Club career ==
=== Al-Wehdat ===
Born in Amman, Al-Dirabany began his career at Al-Wehdat. On 4 August 2019, he signed a 5-year extension with the club.

=== Shabab Al-Ordon ===
On 22 March 2022, Al-Dirabany joined Shabab Al-Ordon for four seasons.

== International career ==
Al-Dirabany began his international career with the Jordan U16 setup. On 29 July 2018, he was named to the 2018 WAFF U-16 Championship squad.

On 2 January 2025, Al-Dirabany was called up to the Jordan national football team for a camp held in Amman.
