= Mohammad Aleikish =

Jordanian footballer

Personal information
- Full name: Mohammad Ahmad Suleiman Aleikish
- Date of birth: 4 October 1996 (age 30)
- Place of birth: Irbid, Jordan
- Height: 1.78 m (5 ft 10 in)
- Position: Striker

Team information
- Current team: Al-Baqa'a

Youth career
- –2017: Al-Arabi

Senior career*
Years	Team	Apps	(Gls)
2017–2019	Al-Arabi		
2019–2020	→Al-Sareeh (loan)		
2020–2023	Al-Faisaly		
2024–2025	Al-Sareeh	21	(14)
2025–2026	Hidd		
2026–	Al-Baqa'a	0	(0)

International career
2025–	Jordan	2	(0)
- * Club domestic league appearances and goals as of 25 July 2026

Mohammad Ahmad Suleiman Aleikish (Arabic: محمد احمد سليمان العكش; born 4 October 1996) is a Jordanian professional footballer who plays as a striker for Jordanian Pro League club Al-Baqa'a.

== Club career ==
=== Al-Arabi (Irbid) ===
Born in Irbid, Aleikish began his career at Al-Arabi.

==== Al-Sareeh (loan) ====
Aleikish was loaned to Al-Sareeh on a short loan, gaining the interest of Al-Faisaly.

=== Al-Faisaly ===
On 15 October 2020, Al-Faisaly signed Aleikish after a strong loan spell at Al-Sareeh.

During his time, he had faced pressure from the club and its fans for him to score goals, resulting in a dark period for the player.

On 28 October 2023, Al-Faisaly announced their intentions not to renew Aleikish's contract. As a result, Aleikish began filing for a legal complaint, due to his club owing him financial dues and a lack of communication with Al-Faisaly's board, despite many attempts from the player. Al-Faisaly alleged that Aleikish's contract ended on 30 October 2023, but Aleikish's lawyer claimed his contract would end on 30 June 2024.

=== Al-Sareeh ===
With Aleikish without a club, he was close to joining Shabab Al-Ordon and Al-Salt during the 2023–24 Jordanian Pro League season.

However, on 23 June 2024, he would wait for the following season to sign and reunite with Al-Sareeh. By 6 January 2025, Aleikish had 9 goals in 11 league appearances for Al-Sareeh, earning him a call-up to the Jordanian national team. Despite Al-Sareeh relegating to the Jordanian First Division League, Aleikish finished with a strong season overall with 14 goals and gaining interest from other Jordanian Pro League clubs.

=== Hidd ===
On 16 August 2025, Aleikish joined Bahraini Premier League club Al-Hidd for an undisclosed length.

== International career ==
On 6 January 2025, Aleikish was called up to the Jordan national football team for a camp held in Amman, replacing the injured Reziq Bani Hani. On 10 January 2025, Aleikish was called up once again to the national team to participate in a training camp held in Doha.
