= Hussein Hassan =

Iraqi footballer (born 2003)

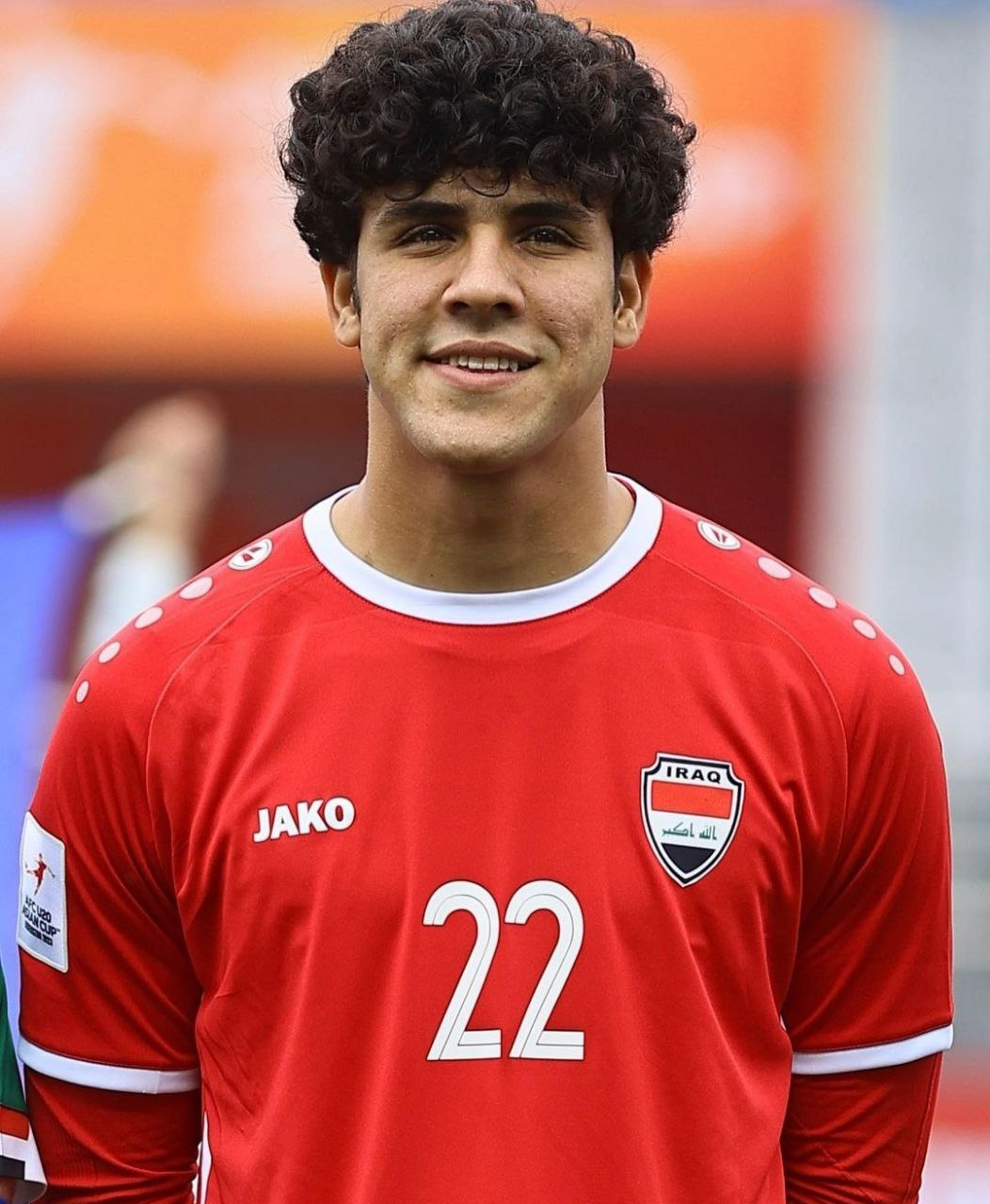
- Hassan with Iraq U20 in 2023

Personal information
- Full name: Hussein Hassan Amoyed Rasetim
- Date of birth: 5 October 2003 (age 23)
- Place of birth: Iraq
- Height: 1.90 m (6 ft 3 in)
- Position: Goalkeeper

Team information
- Current team: Al-Zawraa

Senior career*
Years	Team	Apps	(Gls)
2022–2025	Al-Karkh	27	(0)
2025–	Al-Zawraa		

International career^{‡}
–2021	Iraq U18	9	(0)
2022–2023	Iraq U20	14	(0)
2024–	Iraq U23	7	(0)
Medal record
Men's football
Representing Iraq
AFC U-23 Asian Cup
Bronze medal – third place	2024 Qatar	Team
- * Club domestic league appearances and goals as of 4 July 2024 ‡ National team caps and goals as of 4 July 2024

Hussein Hassan Amoyed Rasetim (Arabic: حسين حسن; born 5 October 2003) is an Iraqi professional footballer who plays as a goalkeeper for Iraq Stars League club Al-Zawraa and the Iraq national team.

== Club career ==
Hussein started his career at Al-Karkh. he was promoted to the first team ahead of the 2022–2023 season. He renewed his contract at the end of the season to remain with the club.

The following season, Hassan managed to grab the number 1 spot at Al-Karkh, appearing in 23 matches as the team finished in 15th place. He renewed his contract to remain with the club for the 2024–2025 season, despite interest from Al Quwa-Al Jawiya.

== International career ==
=== Youth level ===
Hassan first made a name for himself on the U18 level as Iraq won the 2021 U-18 WAFF championship where he saved two penalties in the shootout against Lebanon in the final. He was voted as the best goalkeeper in the tournament.

He then progressed to the U20 side, where he was the main goalkeeper in both the qualifiers and the tournament proper of the 2023 AFC U-20 Asian Cup, where Iraq lost in the final to Uzbekistan. This result qualified Iraq to the 2023 FIFA U-20 World Cup, where he once again was the starting goalkeeper in the tournament. He kept a clean sheet against England following two group stage defeats which knocked Iraq out of the tournament.

Hussein progressed to the U23 side, where he was called up for the first time in January 2024. He made his debut in a 1-0 friendly win over Egypt. He was called up to the 2024 AFC U-23 Asian Cup and started all the games as Iraq finished 3rd in the tournament, qualifying them to the 2024 Olympic Games.

In June 2024, he was named in the final squad for the Olympic Games. He started all three games as Iraq crashed out in the group stage, where he conceded 7 goals in total.

=== Senior team ===
In June 2024, Hassan was called up to the Iraq's World Cup qualification squad to face Indonesia and Vietnam. He was an unused substitute as Iraq went on to win both games and finish top of their group.
