= Younine =

Younine يونين
- Location in Lebanon
- Coordinates: 34°4′47″N 36°16′32″E
- Country: Lebanon
- Governorate: Baalbek-Hermel
- District: Baalbek

Area
  - Total: 7,759 ha (19,170 acres)
- Elevation: 1,215 m (3,986 ft)

Younine (Arabic: يونين, romanized: Yūnīn), also spelled Yunin, is a municipality in the Baalbek District of the Baalbek-Hermel Governorate in northeastern Lebanon. It is located approximately 103 kilometers (64 mi) east of the national capital Beirut, and 18 kilometers (11 mi) northeast of the governorate capital of Baalbek. Its average elevation is 1,215 meters (3,986 ft) above sea level and its jurisdiction covers 7,759 hectares. It had 6,557 registered voters in 2010. Its inhabitants are Shia Muslims.

== History ==
Younine was the ancestral village of the 13th-century Mamluk hadith scholars Abd Allah al-Yunini (d. 1220) and Qutb al-Din Musa ibn Muhammad al-Yunini al-Hanbali of Damascus. Qutb al-Din also owned a residence in the village. At the time Younine also contained a Sufi lodge. The archer Husayn al-Yunini also hailed from Younine.

In 1838, Eli Smith noted Yunin as a Metawileh village in the Baalbek area.

== Notable people ==
- Ali Kassas (born 2003), footballer

== Bibliography ==
- Robinson, E.; Smith, E. (1841). Biblical Researches in Palestine, Mount Sinai and Arabia Petraea: A Journal of Travels in the year 1838. Vol. 3. Boston: Crocker & Brewster.
