= 2021 WAFF U-18 Championship =

بطولة غرب آسيا لكرة القدم تحت 18 عاما

Tournament details
- Host country: Iraq
- Cities: Baghdad (Final match); Basra (Group A); Erbil (Group B)
- Dates: 20 November – 1 December
- Teams: 9 (from 1 sub-confederation)
- Venues: 3 (in 3 host cities)

Final positions
- Champions: Iraq (2nd title)
- Runners-up: Lebanon

Tournament statistics
- Matches played: 17
- Goals scored: 32 (1.88 per match)
- Top scorer: (Iraq) Asahr Ali (3 goals)
- Best player: (Lebanon) Ali El Fadl
- Best goalkeeper: (Iraq) Hussein Amoyed

2021 WAFF U-18 Championship, also called 2021 EarthLink WAFF U-18 Championship due to sponsorship by EarthLink Telecommunications, was the second edition of the West Asian Football Federation (WAFF)'s under-18 championship. It took place between 20 November and 1 December 2021 in Iraq.

The tournament featured nine teams divided into a two groups of four and five. Hosts Iraq won the tournament, beating Lebanon on penalty shoot-outs in the final.

== Teams ==
=== Participants ===
Team	Appearance	Last appearance	Previous best performance
Bahrain	2nd	2019	Group stage (2019)
Iraq	2nd	2019	Champions (2019)
Jordan	2nd	2019	Third place (2019)
Kuwait	1st	—N/a	—N/a
Lebanon	1st	—N/a	—N/a
Palestine	2nd	2019	Fourth place (2019)
Syria	1st	—N/a	—N/a
United Arab Emirates	2nd	2019	Runners-up (2019)
Yemen	1st	—N/a	—N/a

=== Format ===
Two groups of nine teams; the host country Iraq were in Group A, which contained five teams, while Group B contained four teams. Unlike the previous edition, only the group winners advance directly to the final.

=== Squads ===
A total of nine teams played in the tournament, with players born on or after 1 January 2003 eligible to participate. Each team had to register a squad of up to 23 players, three of whom must be goalkeepers.

== Officials ==
Referees

- Mohamad Juma (Bahrain)
- Wathiq Abdullah (Iraq)
- Mohamad Arafah (Jordan)
- Mohamad Mofeed Ghabayen (Jordan)
- Saad Khalifa (Kuwait)
- Maher Al Ali (Lebanon)
- Sheikh Ahmad Alaeddin (Lebanon)
- Braa Abu Aishah (Palestine)
- Mohamad Kanah (Syria)
- Waleed Khaloofa (Yemen)

Assistant referees

- Faisal Al-Alawi (Bahrain)
- Maytham Khammat (Iraq)
- Hamza Saadeh (Jordan)
- Mahmoud Abu Thaher (Jordan)
- Saoud Al-Shemali (Kuwait)
- Ahmad Al Hussaini (Lebanon)
- Mohamad Al Hajje (Lebanon)
- Ashraf Abu Zubaida (Palestine)
- Mohamad Al-Sayed Ali (Syria)
- Omar Haddad (Yemen)

== Venue ==
Basra	Baghdad	Erbil	2021 WAFF U-18 Championship is located in Iraq
Basra International Stadium	Al-Madina Stadium	Franso Hariri Stadium	2021 WAFF U-18 Championship is located in Iraq
Capacity: 65,227	Capacity: 32,000	Capacity: 25,000	2021 WAFF U-18 Championship is located in Iraq

== Groups stage ==
=== Group A ===
Pos	Team	Pld	W	D	L	GF	GA	GD	Pts	Qualification
1	Iraq (H)	4	3	0	1	9	1	+8	9	Advance to the final
2	Kuwait	4	2	1	1	5	5	0	7	
3	Yemen	4	2	0	2	2	4	−2	6	
4	Bahrain	4	1	1	2	3	7	−4	4	
5	Palestine	4	1	0	3	4	6	−2	3	

Source: goalzz
(H) Hosts
20 November 2021
17:00 (GMT+3)

Palestine	1–2	Bahrain
Taha 45+2'	Report	Habeeb 17'; Al-Subaiei 83'

Basra International Stadium
Referee: Maher Al Ali (Lebanon)
20 November 2021
20:00 (GMT+3)

Iraq	3–0	Kuwait
Hassan 59'; Ali 64', 84'	Report

Basra International Stadium
Referee: Mohamad Mofeed (Jordan)

22 November 2021
17:00 (GMT+3)

Bahrain	0–4	Iraq
	Report	Ghasem 38'; Hassan 42'; Ayoub 57'; Qasim 74'

Basra International Stadium
Referee: Mohamad Kanah (Syria)
22 November 2021
20:00 (GMT+3)

Kuwait	2–0	Yemen
Al-Aazmi 48' (pen.), 78'	Report

Basra International Stadium
Referee: Mohamad Arafah (Jordan)

24 November 2021
17:00 (GMT+3)

Yemen	0–2	Palestine
	Report	Al-Subaihi 22' (pen.); Al-Nabrisi 53' (pen.)

Basra International Stadium
Referee: Sheikh Ahmad Alaeddin (Lebanon)
24 November 2021
20:00 (GMT+3)

Kuwait	1–1	Bahrain
Al-Aazmi 79' (pen.)	Report	Habeeb 45'

Basra International Stadium
Referee: Mohamad Mofeed (Jordan)

26 November 2021
17:00 (GMT+3)

Palestine	1–2	Kuwait
Al-Nabrisi 52'	Report	Ebrahimi 30'; Al-Bannay 77'

Basra International Stadium
Referee: Mohamad Kanah (Syria)
26 November 2021
20:00 (GMT+3)

Yemen	1–0	Iraq
Mahross 79'	Report

Basra International Stadium
Attendance: 58,320
Referee: Maher Al Ali (Lebanon)

28 November 2021
17:00 (GMT+3)

Bahrain	0–1	Yemen
	Report	Balabl 9' (pen.)

Basra International Stadium
Referee: Mohamad Arafah (Jordan)
28 November 2021
20:00 (GMT+3)

Iraq	2–0	Palestine
Qasim 19' (pen.); Ali 71'	Report

Basra International Stadium
Attendance: 51,823
Referee: Sheikh Ahmad Alaeddin (Lebanon)

=== Group B ===
Pos	Team	Pld	W	D	L	GF	GA	GD	Pts	Qualification
1	Lebanon	3	2	1	0	3	1	+2	7	Advance to the final
2	Jordan	3	2	0	1	4	1	+3	6	
3	Syria	3	1	0	2	1	3	−2	3	
4	United Arab Emirates	3	0	1	2	1	4	−3	1	

Source: goalzz
23 November 2021
17:00 (GMT+3)

Syria	0–1	Lebanon
	Report	El Fadl 56'

Franso Hariri Stadium
Referee: Mohamad Juma (Bahrain)
23 November 2021
20:00 (GMT+3)

United Arab Emirates	0–2	Jordan
	Report	Al-Asfar 61'; Al-Shanaineh 90+4'

Franso Hariri Stadium
Referee: Baraa Abu Aishah (Palestine)

25 November 2021
17:00 (GMT+3)

Lebanon	1–1	United Arab Emirates
El Fadl 20'	Report	Al-Ameeri 60'

Franso Hariri Stadium
Referee: Wathiq Abdullah (Iraq)
25 November 2021
20:00 (GMT+3)

Jordan	2–0	Syria
Hussein 61'; Al-Shanaineh 78' (pen.)	Report

Franso Hariri Stadium
Referee: Saad Khalifa (Kuwait)

27 November 2021
17:00 (GMT+3)

Syria	1–0	United Arab Emirates
Al-Ayassi 28' (o.g.)	Report

Franso Hariri Stadium
Referee: Waleed Khaloofa (Yemen)
27 November 2021
20:00 (GMT+3)

Jordan	0–1	Lebanon
	Report	El Fadl 53'

Franso Hariri Stadium
Referee: Baraa Abu Aishah (Palestine)

== Final ==
1 December 2021
19:00 (GMT+3)

Iraq	0–0	Lebanon
	Report
Penalties
Ayoub (penalty scored); Mahdi (penalty scored); Fadel (penalty missed); Raad (penalty scored)	3–2	Kassas (penalty scored); Sadek (penalty scored); Al Moussawi (penalty missed); Ghamlouch (penalty missed); El Fadl (penalty missed)

Al-Madina Stadium
Attendance: 32,000
Referee: Mohamad Mofeed Ghabayen (Jordan)

== Champion ==
2021 WAFF U-18 Championship champion

Iraq
Second title

== Player awards ==
The following awards were given at the conclusion of the tournament:

Top Goalscorer	Best player	Best Goalkeeper
(Iraq) Ashar Ali	(Lebanon) Ali El Fadl	(Iraq) Hussein Hassan

== Goalscorers ==
There were 32 goals scored in 17 matches, for an average of 1.88 goals per match.

3 goals

- (Iraq) Ashar Ali
- (Kuwait) Fahad Al-Aazmi
- (Lebanon) Ali El Fadl

2 goals

- (Bahrain) Mubarak Habeeb
- (Iraq) Abdulrazzaq Qasim
- (Iraq) Blnd Hassan
- (Jordan) Amin Al-Shanaineh
- (Palestine) Khaled Al-Nabrisi

1 goal

- (Bahrain) Abdullah Al-Subaiei
- (Iraq) Abdulqader Ayoub
- (Iraq) Alai Ghasem
- (Jordan) Yousef Hussein
- (Jordan) Zaid Al-Asfar
- (Kuwait) Saleh Al-Bannay
- (Kuwait) Sayed Yousef Ebrahimi
- (Palestine) Josef Al-Subaihi
- (Palestine) Qais Taha
- (United Arab Emirates) Sultan Al-Ameeri
- (Yemen) Hamzah Mahross
- (Yemen) Hesham Balabl

1 own goal

- (United Arab Emirates) Nawaf Al-Ayassi (against Syria)
