= Azeez Oseni =

Nigerian footballer (born 2002)

Personal information
- Date of birth: 16 October 2002 (age 24)
- Place of birth: Lagos, Nigeria
- Height: 1.68 m (5 ft 6 in)
- Position: Midfielder

Team information
- Current team: Al-Ramtha
- Number: 25

Youth career
- 36 Lion FC

Senior career*
Years	Team	Apps	(Gls)
–2022	36 Lion FC		
2022	→ Spartak Trnava (loan)	5	(2)
2022	→ Dynamo Malženice (loan)	11	(6)
2023–2024	Spartak Trnava	17	(0)
2024–2025	Leotar	22	(3)
2025–	Al-Ramtha	10	(0)
- * Club domestic league appearances and goals as of 29 January 2026

Azeez Oseni (born 16 October 2002) is a Nigerian professional footballer who plays as a midfielder for Jordanian Pro League club Al-Ramtha.

== Club career ==
=== Spartak Trnava ===
Oseni signed his first professional contract with FC Spartak Trnava in May 2022, joining from Nigerian club 36 Lion FC. Both sides agreed on a one-year loan with an option to buy him.

Oseni made his professional Fortuna Liga debut for Spartak Trnava against MFK Skalica on 27 August 2022. He came in the 77th minute of the match.

== Honours ==
Spartak Trnava

- Slovak Cup: 2022–23

Individual

- Slovak Super Liga Goal of the Month: November 2022
