= 2027 WAFF U-20 Championship =

بطولة غرب آسيا للشباب الكويت 2027
- Dates: March 2027

The 2027 WAFF U-20 Championship (Arabic: بطولة غرب آسيا للشباب 2027) will be the fourth edition of the WAFF U-20 Championship, the international youth football championship organised by West Asian Football Federation (WAFF) for the men's under-20 national teams of West Asia.

Kuwait originally planned to host the tournament from 23 March to 2 April 2026. However, the competition was postponed on 10 March 2026 due to the 2026 Iran War affecting the region. On 20 August 2026, the WAFF announced that the tournament will be held on March 2027, with the Secretariat-General tasked with identifying the host at a later date.

Players born on or after 1 January 2008 are eligible to participate in the competition.

Saudi Arabia are the defending champions, having won their first title in the last edition.
