= Jacques Thémopelé =

Congolese footballer born in 1998

Personal information
- Full name: Jacques Médina Thémopelé
- Date of birth: 8 February 1998 (age 28)
- Place of birth: Brazzaville, Congo
- Height: 1.87 m (6 ft 2 in)
- Position: Striker

Youth career
- 2009–2016: CESD La Djiri

Senior career*
Years	Team	Apps	(Gls)
2017–2020	CA Bizertin	51	(7)
2019	→ AS Gabès (loan)	13	(2)
2020–2021	Stade Tunisien	20	(5)
2021–2023	AS Vita Club	5	(3)
2023–2024	Al-Hidd	5	(3)
2024–2025	Al-Hussein	2	(2)
2025	East Riffa		
2025–2026	PSM Makassar	28	(1)

International career
2016	Congo U20	2	(1)
2019	Congo U23	2	(2)
- * Club domestic league appearances and goals as of 23 May 2026

Jacques Médina Thémopelé (born 8 February 1998) is a Congolese professional footballer who plays as a striker.

== Club career ==
=== Early career ===
Born in Brazzaville, Jacques Médina Thémopelé joined CESD La Djiri at a very young age, where he spent seven years of training before beginning his professional career in Tunisia.

=== CA Bizertin ===
Spotted during a quarter-final match of the Congo Cup between CESD La Djiri and CARA Brazzaville by his agent, Jacques Médina Thémopelé signed a four-year professional contract with Tunisian Ligue Professionnelle 1 side CA Bizertin.

Thémopelé had terminated his contract with CA Bizertin and signed with Stade Tunisien during the winter. However, his terminated contract was blocked by his former club after having played only two and a half years.

==== AS Gabès (loan) ====
As a result of the blockade, Thémopelé was temporarily loaned to AS Gabès, playing mid-season before coming back to fulfill his four-year contract.

=== Stade Tunisien ===
After fulfilling his four-year contract, Thémopelé signed a two and a half year contract with Stade Tunisien.

=== AS Vita Club ===
On 1 July 2021, Thémopelé joined Linafoot side AS Vita Club as a free agent for two seasons.

=== PSM Makassar ===
On 15 August 2025, Indonesian club PSM Makassar announced the signing of Thémopelé.
