= Jordi Jaku =

Albanian footballer (born 2006)

Personal information
- Full name: Jordi Jaku
- Date of birth: 27 March 2006 (age 20)
- Place of birth: Rrëshen, Albania
- Position: Defensive midfielder

Team information
- Current team: Bologna

Youth career
- 2015–2020: Mirdita
- 2016–2020: Rrësheni
- 2018–2020: Mirdita
- 2020–2022: Shënkolli
- 2022–2023: Dinamo Tirana

Senior career*
Years	Team	Apps	(Gls)
2022–2023	Dinamo City	5	(0)
2023–2025	Tirana	13	(0)
2025–	Bologna	0	(0)

International career^{‡}
2021	Albania U15	4	(0)
2022	Albania U16	2	(1)
2022–2023	Albania U17	12	(0)
2023–	Albania U19	7	(0)
- * Club domestic league appearances and goals as of 22 January 2024 ‡ National team caps and goals as of 22 January 2024

Jordi Jaku (born 27 March 2006) is an Albanian professional footballer who plays as a defensive midfielder for Serie A club Bologna .

== Career statistics ==
=== Club ===
As of 22 January 2024

Club statistics
Club	Season	League			Cup		Europe (Note: Including continental competitions, such as UEFA Champions League and UEFA Europa League)		Other		Total	
Club	Season	Division	Apps	Goals	Apps	Goals	Apps	Goals	Apps	Goals	Apps	Goals
Dinamo Tirana/City	2022–23	Kategoria e Parë	5	0	1	0	—		—		6	0
Tirana	2023–24	Kategoria Superiore	1	0	0	0	—		0	0	1	0
Career total			6	0	1	0	0	0	0	0	7	0

== Honours ==
=== Club ===
Dinamo Tirana/City

  - Runner-up:Kategoria e Parë: 2022–23
