= Bibert Kaghado =

American soccer player and coach

Personal information
- Date of birth: March 31, 1974 (age 52)
- Position: Midfielder

Senior career*
Years	Team	Apps	(Gls)
1995	FC Kolos Krasnodar	0	(0)
1995	FC Kolos-2 Krasnodar	8	(0)
1997	PFC Spartak Nalchik	5	(1)
1997	PFC Spartak-2 Nalchik	11	(8)
1998	PFC Spartak Nalchik	5	(0)

Managerial career
- 2008–2009: Jordan (futsal)
- 2009–2010: Jordan U-17
- 2010–2014: Jordan U-19
- 2015–2016: FC Druzhba Maykop
- * Club domestic league appearances and goals

Bibert Kaghado (born March 31, 1974) is an American soccer coach and a former player.
