= Tiago Moutinho =

Portuguese football manager

Personal information
- Full name: Tiago Gonçalves Moutinho Ribeiro
- Date of birth: 15 June 1980 (age 46)
- Place of birth: Porto, Portugal

Managerial career
- Years: Team
- 2011–2012: Sporting CP U19 (assistant)
- 2012: Sporting CP (assistant)
- 2012–2013: Red Star Belgrade (assistant)
- 2013–2014: OFI (assistant)
- 2014–2015: Atromitos (assistant)
- 2015–2016: Belenenses (assistant)
- 2016–2019: Shandong Taishan (youth coach)
- 2019–2020: Ponferradina (assistant)
- 2020–2021: Sanjoanense (assistant)
- 2021–2022: Sanjoanense
- 2023–2024: Académica de Coimbra
- 2024: Al-Hussein

Tiago Gonçalves Moutinho Ribeiro (born 15 June 1980) is a Portuguese professional football manager who was most recently the manager for Jordanian Pro League side Al-Hussein.

== Managerial career ==
=== Al-Hussein SC (Irbid) ===
On 11 July 2024, defending champions Al-Hussein appointed Tiago Moutinho as their manager.
