= Mohammed Al-Emwase =

Jordanian footballer (born 1989)

Personal information
- Full name: Mohamed Fawzi Mahmoud Abukhalil Al-Emwase
- Date of birth: 8 August 1996 (age 30)
- Place of birth: Jordan
- Height: 1.83 m (6 ft 0 in)
- Position: Goalkeeper

Team information
- Current team: Al-Wehdat
- Number: 45

Youth career
- –2015: Al-Faisaly

Senior career*
Years	Team	Apps	(Gls)
2015–2024	Al-Faisaly		
2018–2019	→Al-Ahli (loan)		
2021–2022	→Balama (loan)		
2024–2026	Al-Salt	30	(0)
2026	Al-Najaf	12	(0)
2026–	Al-Wehdat	0	(0)
- * Club domestic league appearances and goals as of 1 June 2026 ‡ National team caps and goals as of 8 March 2025

Mohamed Fawzi Mahmoud Abukhalil Al-Emwase (Arabic: محمد العمواسي; born 8 August 1996) is a Jordanian professional footballer who plays as a goalkeeper for Jordanian Pro League club Al-Wehdat and the Jordan national team.

== Club career ==
=== Al-Faisaly ===
Al-Emwase is a youth product of Al-Faisaly. He featured in Al-Faisaly's 2017 Arab Club Championship run, where they would eventually finish as runners-up of the competition.

=== Al-Salt ===
On 16 July 2024, Al-Emwase moved to Al-Salt for an undisclosed fee.

=== Al-Najaf ===
On 26 January 2026, Al-Emwase joined Iraq Stars League club Al-Najaf.

== International career ==
On 8 March 2025, Al-Emwase received a call up to the Jordan national football team for the 2026 FIFA World Cup qualification matches against Palestine and South Korea.
