= Waseem Al-Bzour =

Jordanian footballer

Personal information
- Full name: Waseem Hassan Abdullah Al-Bzour
- Date of birth: November 24, 1979 (age 46)
- Place of birth: Al-Ramtha, Jordan
- Position: Defender

Youth career
- 1994-1997: Al-Ramtha

Senior career*
Years	Team	Apps	(Gls)
1997–2004	Al-Ramtha		
2004–2010	Shabab Al-Ordon		
2010–2012	Al-Faisaly		
2012–2014	Shabab Al-Ordon		
2014	That Ras Club		
2015	Al-Ramtha		
2015–2016	Shabab Al-Ordon		

International career
2007–2008	Jordan	8	(2)

Managerial career
- 2020–2022: Shabab Al-Ordon
- 2023–2024: Al-Ramtha
- 2025: Shabab Al-Ordon
- * Club domestic league appearances and goals

Waseem Hassan Abdullah Al-Bzour is a retired Jordanian footballer.

== Personal life and family ==
Waseem is married and has four sons: Bisan, Zaid, Hassouneh and Aboud.

== International Goals ==
#	Date	Venue	Opponent	Score	Result	Competition
1	January 31, 2008	Zarqa	Singapore	2-1	Win	Friendly
2	March 26, 2008	Ashgabat	Turkmenistan	2-0	Win	2010 FIFA World Cup qualification
