= Alai Ghasem =

Iraqi footballer (born 2003)

Personal information
- Full name: Alai Fadel Ali Hussain Ghasem
- Date of birth: 16 February 2003 (age 23)
- Place of birth: Gothenburg, Sweden
- Height: 1.80 m (5 ft 11 in)
- Position: Right-back

Team information
- Current team: Örebro SK
- Number: 2

Youth career
- –2019: BK Häcken
- 2020–2022: IFK Göteborg

Senior career*
Years	Team	Apps	(Gls)
2022–2024	IFK Göteborg	8	(0)
2023	→ Utsiktens BK (loan)	3	(0)
2024	→ AFC Eskilstuna (loan)	5	(0)
2024	Newroz	0	(0)
2025–	Örebro SK	26	(0)

International career^{‡}
2021–2023	Iraq U20	8	(1)
2022–	Iraq	8	(0)
- * Club domestic league appearances and goals as of 12 November 2026 ‡ National team caps and goals as of 21:05, 26 July 2023 (UTC)

Alai Fadel Ali Hussain Ghasem (Arabic: الاي فاضل علي حسين قاسم; born 16 February 2003) is a footballer who plays as a right-back for Örebro SK. Born in Sweden, he represents the Iraq national team.

== Club career ==
On 27 Match 2024, Ghasem was loaned out to AFC Eskilstuna.

== International career ==
Ghasem was born in Sweden to an Iraqi father and Algerian mother. He represented the Iraq under-19s in November 2021.

On 23 September 2022, Alai made his first team debut for Iraq in a penalty shootout loss against Oman in the 2022 Jordan International Tournament. He has been called up to the 2023 FIFA U-20 World Cup.

== Honours ==
Iraq

- Arabian Gulf Cup: 2023
