= Mohannad Semreen =

Jordanian footballer

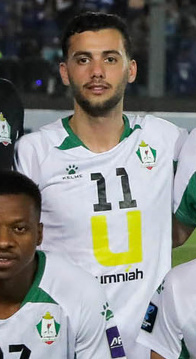
- Semreen with Al-Wehdat in 2025

Personal information
- Full name: Mohannad Jehad Ahmad Semreen
- Date of birth: 8 January 2002 (age 24)
- Place of birth: Zarqa, Jordan
- Height: 1.76 m (5 ft 9 in)
- Position: Winger

Team information
- Current team: Al-Zulfi
- Number: 11

Youth career
- –2020: Al-Wehdat

Senior career*
| Years | Team | Apps | (Gls) |
| 2020–2026 | Al-Wehdat | | |
| 2023 | →Al-Salt (loan) | | |
| 2026– | Al-Zulfi | | |

International career^{‡}
| 2017–2019 | Jordan U-17 | | |
- * Club domestic league appearances and goals as of 26 February 2026 ‡ National team caps and goals as of 10 October 2024

Mohannad Jehad Ahmad Semreen (Arabic: مهند جهاد أحمد سمرين; born 8 January 2002) is a Jordanian professional footballer who plays as a winger for Saudi First Division League side Al-Zulfi.

== Club career ==
=== Al-Wehdat ===
Mohannad Semreen began his career at Al-Wehdat. Having gained comparisons to club legend Ra'fat Ali, Semreen signed a professional contract on 20 September 2019 on a five-year contract.

On 10 January 2021, it was announced that Mohannad Semreen had torn his ACL during a Jordanian Pro League match against Al-Sareeh. Later that month, Semreen was scheduled to have his surgery to recover from the injury in Doha, potentially sidelining him between 9 and 12 months. However, in an interview, Semreen complained to the Jordan Football Association for negligence towards his injury and delays to his treatment. He had to stay in Jordan for 5 months after his injury before traveling to Qatar for his treatment, which was found to have further complications and required new operations to his knee. By 31 May 2022, Semreen was still sidelined from his injury, with further tensions between him and the federation.

On 17 January 2023, after a two-season absence, Semreen returned to training with Al-Wehdat and was eager to return to the squad.

=== Al-Salt (loan) ===
On 1 July 2023, after struggling to regain minutes after his long period of absence, Al-Wehdat decided to loan Semreen to Al-Salt until the end of the 2023-24 Jordanian Pro League season. However, his contract was terminated on 6 December 2023, due to a lack of matches played.

=== Return to Al-Wehdat ===
After his brief tenure at Al-Salt, as well as a failed move to Shabab Al-Ordon, Semreen decided to train with Al-Wehdat for the 2024-25 Jordanian Pro League season. On 18 July 2024, Semreen signed a five-year extension to stay with Al-Wehdat.

During the 2024-25 AFC Champions League Two, Semreen produced 2 assist, playing a key role in Al-Wehdat's victory to Iranian club Sepahan.

== International career ==
Semreen was a part of the Jordanian national team system since 2017, where he played for the Jordan U-17's as a 15-year-old. Semreen later participated in the 2019 WAFF U-18 Championship, scoring a goal in the competition, as well as finishing in third place that tournament.

On 2 October 2024, Semreen was called up to the Jordan national football team as a part of the 2026 FIFA World Cup qualification process.

== Playing style ==
Semreen is described as a player with a distinguished skill, vision, as well as a playmaking ability.

== Honours ==
Al-Wehdat

- Jordan FA Cup: 2023–24, 2024–25
