= 2019 WAFF U-18 Championship =

Tournament details
- Host country: Palestine
- City: Ramallah
- Dates: 22–30 August
- Teams: 6 (from 1 sub-confederation)
- Venue(s): 1 (in 1 host city)

Final positions
- Champions: Iraq (1st title)
- Runners-up: United Arab Emirates
- Third place: Jordan
- Fourth place: Palestine

Tournament statistics
- Matches played: 11
- Goals scored: 31 (2.82 per match)

2019 WAFF U-18 Championship was the first edition of the WAFF U-18 Championship. A WAFF youth football championship organised by the West Asian Football Federation (WAFF) for the men's under-18 national teams of West Asia. It was held in Ramallah, Palestine from 22 August to 30 August 2019.

== Format ==
The group winner and the second-placed team of the two groups in the first round played in a single round-robin format, qualified for the semi-finals.

== Participating nations ==
6 West Asian Federation teams entered the competition.

- Jordan
- Palestine (hosts)
- Qatar
- Iraq
- United Arab Emirates
- Bahrain

== Officials ==
Referees

- Murad Al Zawahreh (Jordan)
- Isa Abdulla Ali (Bahrain)
- Yousif Saeed Hasan (Iraq)
- Baraa Abu Aisha (Palestine)
- Khaled Al-Shaqsi (Oman)
- Abdullah Al-Kanderi (Kuwait)
- (United Arab Emirates) Yaqoub Al-Hammadi (United Arab Emirates)

Assistant Referees

- Hamza Abu Obied (Jordan)
- Sayed Faisal Al Alawi (Bahrain)
- Akram Jabbar (Iraq)
- Farooq Assi (Palestine)
- Abdulla Al-Jardani (Oman)
- Ali Jaraq (Kuwait)
- (United Arab Emirates) Masoud Hassan Fard (United Arab Emirates)

== Group stage ==
=== Group A ===
Pos	Team	Pld	W	D	L	GF	GA	GD	Pts	Qualification
1	Jordan	2	2	0	0	7	1	+6	6	Final stage
2	Palestine	2	0	1	1	2	4	−2	1	Final stage
3	Qatar	2	0	1	1	3	7	−4	1	

Source: WAFF
22 August 2019
19:00

Jordan	2–0	Palestine
AlQeisi 31'; Abu Rahal 39'	Report

Faisal al-Husseini International Stadium, Ramallah
Referee: Yaqoub Al-Hammadi (United Arab Emirates)

24 August 2019
16:00

Qatar	1–5	Jordan
Tombari 28'	Report	AlQeisi 29'; Al-Riyalat 39', 82'; Semreen 78'; ElBashabsheh 90'

Faisal al-Husseini International Stadium, Ramallah
Referee: Yousif Saeed Hasan (Iraq)

26 August 2019
19:00

Palestine	2–2	Qatar
Baniowda 40', 65'	Report	Altairi 6'; Alhadhrami 89'

Faisal al-Husseini International Stadium, Ramallah
Referee: Isa Abdulla Ali (Bahrain)

=== Group B ===
Pos	Team	Pld	W	D	L	GF	GA	GD	Pts	Qualification
1	United Arab Emirates	2	1	1	0	4	2	+2	4	Final stage
2	Iraq	2	1	0	1	4	5	−1	3	Final stage
3	Bahrain	1	0	1	0	1	2	−1	1	

Source: WAFF
22 August 2019
16:00

United Arab Emirates	0–0	Bahrain
	Report

Faisal al-Husseini International Stadium, Ramallah
Referee: Murad Al Zawahreh (Jordan)

24 August 2019
19:00

Iraq	2–4	United Arab Emirates
Kadah 37'; Tareq 69'	Report	Mubarak 22'; Alhammadi 59', 63'; Almaazmi 80'

Faisal al-Husseini International Stadium, Ramallah
Referee: Khaled Al-Shaqsi (Oman)

26 August 2019
16:00

Bahrain	1–2	Iraq
Mohamed 90'	Report	Khudhair 36'; Chitheer 84'

Faisal al-Husseini International Stadium, Ramallah
Referee: Baraa Abu Aisha (Palestine)

== Knockout stage ==
=== Bracket ===
Semi-finals
28 August
Jordan	1 (2)
Iraq (p)	1 (4)
28 August
United Arab Emirates(p)	0 (4)
Palestine	0 (1)

Final
30 August
Iraq(p)	0 (4)
United Arab Emirates	0 (2)
Third place
30 August
Palestine	0
Jordan	3

=== Semi-finals ===
28 August 2019
16:00

Jordan	1–1	Iraq
Penalties
	2–4

Faisal al-Husseini International Stadium, Ramallah
Referee: Yaqoub Al-Hammadi (United Arab Emirates)
28 August 2019
19:30

United Arab Emirates	0–0	Palestine
Penalties
	4–1

Faisal al-Husseini International Stadium, Ramallah
Referee: Abdullah Al-Kanderi (Kuwait)

=== Fifth place ===
29 August 2019
17:00

Qatar	2–3	Bahrain
	Report

Faisal al-Husseini International Stadium, Ramallah
Referee: Yousif Saeed Hasan (Iraq)

=== Third place ===
30 August 2019
16:00

Palestine	0–3	Jordan

Faisal al-Husseini International Stadium, Ramallah
Referee: Abdullah Al-Kanderi (Kuwait)

=== Final ===
30 August 2019
19:30

Iraq	0–0	United Arab Emirates
	Report
Penalties
Ali (penalty scored); Abdljalel (penalty scored); Mohammed (penalty scored); Hadi (penalty scored); Maknzi (penalty missed)	4–2	(penalty scored) Alhammadi; (penalty missed) Aljneibi; (penalty scored) Almaazmi; (penalty missed) Albeshr

Faisal al-Husseini International Stadium, Ramallah
Referee: Baraa Abu Aisha (Palestine)

== Champion ==
2019 WAFF U-17 Championship champion

Iraq
First title
