= WAFF U-20 Championship =

- Founded: 2019; 7 years ago
- Region: West Asia (WAFF)
- Teams: 12 (as of 2024)
- Current champions: Saudi Arabia (1st title)
- Most championships: Iraq (2 titles)
- 2027 WAFF U-20 Championship

The WAFF U-20 Championship (Arabic: بطولة اتحاد غرب آسيا للشباب تحت 20 عاماً) is an international football competition organised by the West Asian Football Federation (WAFF) for the men's youth national teams of its member associations. The competition was inaugurated in 2019 as the WAFF U-18 Championship, before being held as the WAFF U-19 Championship in 2024 and being scheduled to become an under-20 competition in 2027.

== History ==
The first edition was held in Ramallah, Palestine, from 22 to 30 August 2019 as the WAFF U-18 Championship. Six teams participated in the inaugural tournament, which was organised as preparation for the 2020 AFC U-19 Championship qualification campaign. Iraq won the title after defeating the United Arab Emirates on penalties in the final.

The 2021 edition was again held as an under-18 competition, this time in Iraq from 20 November to 1 December. Nine teams participated, with matches played in Basra, Erbil, and Baghdad. Iraq retained the title after defeating Lebanon on penalties in the final.

The competition returned in 2024 as the WAFF U-19 Championship. Hosted in Taif, Saudi Arabia, from 25 June to 5 July, the tournament featured 12 teams, including Albania as a guest nation. Saudi Arabia won the championship after defeating the United Arab Emirates 1–0 in the final.

The 2027 edition is scheduled to be the first held at under-20 level. The tournament was originally planned to take place in Kuwait from 23 March to 2 April 2026, but was postponed in March 2026. In August 2026, WAFF announced that the tournament would instead be held in March 2027, with the host to be determined.

== Results ==
Edition	Year	Hosts	Champions	Score and Venue	Runners-up	Third place	Score and Venue	Fourth place	No. of Teams
1	2019	Palestine	Iraq	0–0 (a.e.t.) (4–2 pen.); Faisal al-Husseini Stadium, Ramallah	United Arab Emirates	Jordan	3–0; Faisal al-Husseini Stadium, Ramallah	Palestine	6
2	2021	Iraq	Iraq	0–0 (a.e.t.) (3–2 pen.); Al-Madina Stadium, Baghdad	Lebanon	(Note: There were neither semi-finals nor a third-place match in 2021.)			9
3	2024	Saudi Arabia	Saudi Arabia	1–0	United Arab Emirates	Jordan and Syria (Note: The two semi-finalists did not play a third-place match.)			12

Notes

- a.e.t.: after extra time
- pen.: after penalty shoot-out
- TBD: to be determined

== Teams reaching the top four ==
Teams reaching the top four
Team	Titles	Runners-up	Third place	Fourth place	Semi-finalists	Total
Iraq	2 (2019, 2021)					2
Saudi Arabia	1 (2024)					1
United Arab Emirates		2 (2019, 2024)				2
Lebanon		1 (2021)				1
Jordan			1 (2019)		1 (2024)	2
Syria					1 (2024)	1
Palestine				1 (2019)		1

== See also ==
- WAFF Championship
- WAFF U-23 Championship
- WAFF U-17 Championship
- AFC U-20 Asian Cup
