= Jordan national under-20 football team =

National association football team

Jordan U-20
- Nickname(s): النشامى (The Chivalrous Ones)
- Association: Jordan Football Association
- Confederation: AFC (Asia)
- Sub-confederation: WAFF (West Asia)
- Head coach: Ibrahim Helmy
- FIFA code: JOR
First colours	Second colours

FIFA U-20 World Cup
- Appearances: 1 (first in 2007)
- Best result: Group stage (2007)

AFC U-20 Asian Cup
- Appearances: 9 (first in 1977)
- Best result: 4th Place (2006)

Arab Cup U-20
- Appearances: 4 (first in 1983)
- Best result: Quarter-finals (2022)

The Jordan national under-20 football team (Arabic: منتخب الأردن تحت 20 سنة لكرة القدم) is the national under-20 football team of Jordan and is controlled by the Jordan Football Association. This team can also be managed as an under-18 or under-19 team if necessary.

The team has qualified once for the FIFA U-20 World Cup in 2007. The team has also qualified for the AFC U-20 Asian Cup on a total of 9 occasions, most recently in 2025. Finally, Jordan has qualified for the Arab Cup U-20 on a total of 4 occasions, with their best finish being a Quarter-finals spot in 2022.

== Recent results and fixtures ==
Win Draw Loss Fixture

The following is a list of match results in the last 12 months, as well as any future matches that have been scheduled.

=== 2026 ===
13 February Friendly	Singapore	0–2	Jordan	Kallang, Singapore
19:30 UTC+8		Report	Al-Zaghaiba 54', 68'	Stadium: Kallang Football Hub; Referee: Jansen Foo (Singapore)

16 February Friendly	Singapore	1–2	Jordan	Kallang, Singapore
19:30 UTC+8	21'	Report	Al-Khatib 42'; Hamdomeh 72'	Stadium: Kallang Football Hub

24 March ~~2026 WAFF U-20 Championship GS~~	Iraq	Cancelled (Note: Originally scheduled on 26 March, the 2026 WAFF U-20 Championship tournament got postponed for the time being due to the 2026 Iran war.)	Jordan	Mangaf, Kuwait
17:00				Stadium: Fahaheel Stadium

26 March ~~2026 WAFF U-20 Championship GS~~	Jordan	Cancelled	United Arab Emirates	Sulaibikhat, Kuwait
17:00				Stadium: Sulaibikhat Stadium

28 March ~~2026 WAFF U-20 Championship GS~~	Syria	Cancelled	Jordan	Sulaibikhat, Kuwait
20:00				Stadium: Sulaibikhat Stadium

4 June Friendly	Saudi Arabia	2–0	Jordan	Derince, Türkiye
17:00 UTC+3	57'; 70'	Report	Red card	Stadium: Derince Belediye Stadyumu

6 June Friendly	Jordan	1–2	Panama	Gölcük, Türkiye
18:00 UTC+3	Al-Khatib 68' (pen.)	Report	43' (pen.); 51'	Stadium: Gölcük Şehir Stadyumu

8 June Friendly	Jordan	0–0	Iraq	Gölcük, Türkiye
18:00 UTC+3		Report		Stadium: Gölcük Şehir Stadyumu

17 July Friendly	Jordan	1–2	Uzbekistan	Amman, Jordan
17:00 UTC+3	Al-Dajani 9'	Report	Tulaganov 52'; Jumadillaev 55'	Stadium: King Abdullah II Stadium

20 July Friendly	Jordan	1–1	Uzbekistan	As-Salt, Jordan
17:00 UTC+3	Al-Dajani 77'	Report	Tulaganov 90+8'	Stadium: Prince Hussein Stadium

28 July Friendly	Egypt	2–0	Jordan	6th of October, Egypt
20:00 UTC+3	40'; 55'	Report		Stadium: EFA Stadium

31 July Friendly	Egypt	3–0	Jordan	6th of October, Egypt
20:00 UTC+3	Medhat 18'; Hamad 45', 45+5'	Report		Stadium: EFA Stadium

8 August Friendly	Kuwait	0–1	Jordan	Sulaibikhat, Kuwait
20:00 UTC+3		Report	Al-Khatib 9'	Stadium: Jaber Al-Mubarak Al-Hamad Stadium

11 August Friendly	Kuwait	0–1	Jordan	Sulaibikhat, Kuwait
23:00 UTC+3		Report	Al-Shawashreh 90+3'	Stadium: Jaber Al-Mubarak Al-Hamad Stadium

20 August Friendly	Saudi Arabia	2–1	Jordan	Doha, Qatar
19:00 UTC+3	Salem 30'; Abdullah 72'		Al-Tmaizi 75'	Stadium: Aspire Stadium

31 August 2027 AFC U-20 Asian Cup qualification	Jordan	1–0	Afghanistan	Isa Town, Bahrain
17:00 UTC+3	Ramadan 41'	Report (AFC); Report (JFA}		Stadium: Khalifa Sports City Stadium; Referee: Said Al-Mezeini (Oman)

3 September 2027 AFC U-20 Asian Cup qualification	Bahrain	1–2	Jordan	Isa Town, Bahrain
20:30 UTC+3	Al Asam 76'	Report (AFC); Report (JFA)	Al-Dajani 58'; Abuzaid 90+4'	Stadium: Khalifa Sports City Stadium; Referee: Clifford Daypuyat (Philippines)

6 September 2027 AFC U-20 Asian Cup qualification	Jordan	0–1	Tajikistan	Isa Town, Bahrain
17:00 UTC+3		Report (AFC); Report (JFA)	Isakov 55'	Stadium: Khalifa Sports City Stadium; Referee: Zhang Lei (China)

11 November Friendly	Jordan	2–0	Indonesia	Antalya, Türkiye
15:30 UTC+3	Al-Rabie 42'; Abu Mushref 47'	Report		Stadium: Regnum Football Center

14 November Friendly	United States	4–0	Jordan	Antalya, Türkiye
16:00 UTC+3	Nelich 46', 52'; Oliveira 55'; Adams 85'	Report (JFA) Report (USYNT)		Stadium: Regnum Football Center

== Coaching staff ==
=== Current personnel ===
As of 19 March 2026

Position	Coach
Technical director	(Tunisia) Abdelhay Ben Soltane
Head coach	(Jordan) Ibrahim Helmi
Assistant coach	(Jordan) Odai Al-Saify
Goalkeeping coach	(Jordan) Mohammad Al-Khlaylt
Fitness coach	(Jordan) Ahmad Muhanna

== Players ==
=== Current squad ===
The following 23 players were called up for the friendly matches against Indonesia and the United States on 11 and 14 November 2026; respectively.

Head coach: Ibrahim Helmy

No.	Pos.	Player	Date of birth (age)	Club
1	GK	Mohammad Al-Shloul	29 January 2008 (age 18)	(Jordan Football Association) Al-Hussein
12	GK	Laith Al-Muhawara		(Jordan Football Association)
22	GK	Ahmad Al-Faluji	17 January 2008 (age 18)	(Jordan Football Association) Al-Faisaly
2	DF	Tariq Dahamsheh	2007 (age 18–19)	(Jordan Football Association) Al-Faisaly
3	DF	Hussein Al-Diabat	2 May 2008 (age 18)	(Jordan Football Association) Al-Ramtha
4	DF	Omar Al-Mraiheel		(Jordan Football Association)
5	DF	Mohammad Abu Mushref		(Jordan Football Association) Al-Baqa'a
13	DF	Ahed Al-Shahadat		(Jordan Football Association) Doqara
14	DF	Youssef Abu Hassan		(Jordan Football Association) Future Vision Academy
15	DF	Qusai Deeb		(Jordan Football Association) Al-Wehdat
6	MF	Ali Al-Maayta		(Jordan Football Association)
7	MF	Alzean Odeh	24 March 2008 (age 18)	(Jordan Football Association) Amman FC
8	MF	Saud Abuzaid		(Jordan Football Association) Al-Ahli
17	MF	Mohammad Ghalia	2007 (age 18–19)	(Jordan Football Association) Al-Ahli
21	MF	Ismail Freihat	2007 (age 18–19)	(Jordan Football Association) Shabab Al-Ordon
9	FW	Malik Al-Bustanji		(Jordan Football Association) Al-Ahli
10	FW	Qais Al-Shawashreh	17 January 2008 (age 18)	(Jordan Football Association) Al-Salt
11	FW	Mohammad Nemer		(Jordan Football Association)
19	FW	Laith Al-Rabie	27 July 2009 (age 17)	(Jordan Football Association) Al-Ramtha
20	FW	Mohammad Hamdomeh	2007 (age 18–19)	(Jordan Football Association) Al-Wehdat
16		Nasser Ahmad		(Jordan Football Association)
18		Othman Al-Quwaism		(Jordan Football Association)
23		Hussein Al-Muharramah		(Jordan Football Association)

=== Recent call-ups ===
The following players have been called up within the last 12 months and remain eligible for selection.

Pos.	Player	Date of birth (age)	Caps	Goals	Club	Latest call-up
GK	Noor Yaseen	22 July 2007 (age 19)	-	-	(Jordan) Al-Faisaly	September training camp
GK	Motaz Al Shmayleh	2009 (age 16–17)	-	-	(Jordan) Al-Faisaly	September training camp
GK	Qusai Al-Halhala	24 April 2008 (age 18)	-	-	Jordan Knights	v. Tajikistan, 6 September 2026
GK	Azd Yaish	2009 (age 16–17)			Jordan Knights	v. Kuwait, 11 August 2026
GK	Mohammad Al-Lataifah	20 January 2007 (age 19)			(Jordan) Al-Wehdat	v. Egypt, 31 July 2026
DF	Ahmad Abu Koush	26 November 2007 (age 18)	-	-	(Jordan) Al-Faisaly	September training camp
DF	Mohanad Al-Mahsiri	22 June 2008 (age 18)	-	-	(Jordan) Al-Wehdat	September training camp
DF	Omar Al-Khatib	2007 (age 18–19)	-	-	(Jordan) Doqara	v. Tajikistan, 6 September 2026
DF	Omar Al-Shawabka	2007 (age 18–19)	-	-	(Jordan) Al-Faisaly	v. Tajikistan, 6 September 2026
DF	Iyad Al-Amawy	21 February 2007 (age 19)	-	-	(Jordan) Al-Yarmouk	v. Tajikistan, 6 September 2026
DF	Faisal Al-Louzi				(Jordan) Al-Faisaly	v. Egypt, 31 July 2026
DF	Khazraj Al-Qasem	2008 (age 17–18)	-	-	(Jordan) Al-Faisaly	v. Egypt, 31 July 2026
DF	Yasser Al-Hambooz	6 December 2008 (age 17)			(Jordan) Al-Jazeera	v. Uzbekistan, 20 July 2026
DF	Ali Al-Eweiwi	21 February 2007 (age 19)			(Jordan) Al-Faisaly	v. Iraq, 8 June 2026
DF	Zaid Al-Khawaldeh				(Jordan) Al-Sarhan	v. Iraq, 8 June 2026
DF	Mo'men Odat				(Jordan) Al-Hussein	2026 WAFF U-20 Championship
DF	Seif Taha	16 October 2007 (age 19)	-	-	PSG Academy France	2026 WAFF U-20 Championship
MF	Ali Al-Shogran	2008 (age 17–18)		-	(Jordan) Al-Ramtha	September training camp
MF	Zaid Al-Khalidi	11 May 2008 (age 18)			Jordan Knights	September training camp
MF	Abdulrahman Saqallah	25 November 2007 (age 18)			(Jordan) Al-Wehdat	September training camp
MF	Abdelmajeed Khreisat	2007 (age 18–19)	-	-	(Jordan) Shabab Al-Ordon	September training camp
MF	Ali Al-Nueimi	20 May 2007 (age 19)	-	-	(Jordan) Al-Hussein	v. Tajikistan, 6 September 2026
MF	Adeeb Ramadan	3 March 2007 (age 19)	-	-	(Jordan) Al-Hussein	v. Tajikistan, 6 September 2026
MF	Mohammad Al-Baytar	13 July 2007 (age 19)	-	-	(Jordan) Al-Ramtha	v. Tajikistan, 6 September 2026
MF	Mohammad Abu Al-Ghanam	12 January 2008 (age 18)			Jordan Knights	v. Kuwait, 11 August 2026
MF	Abd Al-Kareem Al-Onaizat		-	-	(Jordan)	v. Singapore, 16 February 2026
MF	Hamza Aljadaa		-	-	(Jordan) Al-Hussein	v. Singapore, 16 February 2026
MF	Mohammad Asfour				(Jordan) Al-Jazeera	v. Russia, 15 November 2025
FW	Mohammad Abu Romeh	24 February 2008 (age 18)			(Jordan) Al-Salt	September training camp
FW	Osama Al-Jawhari	29 April 2009 (age 17)		-	(Jordan) Al-Khader Soccer Academy	September training camp
FW	Ayed Al-Khawalda	2008 (age 17–18)			(Jordan) Al-Sarhan	September training camp
FW	Taleb Abu Sheikha		-	-	(Jordan) Al-Wehdat	September training camp
FW	Naser Al-Dajani	1 January 2007 (age 19)	-	-	(Spain) Córdoba B	v. Tajikistan, 6 September 2026
FW	Abdulrahman Al-Zaghaiba	10 April 2007 (age 19)	-	-	(Jordan) Al-Jazeera	v. Tajikistan, 6 September 2026
FW	Mahmoud Al-Tmaizi	4 April 2008 (age 18)	-	-	(Jordan) Al-Hussein	v. Tajikistan, 6 September 2026
FW	Assem Abu Ayyash	2007 (age 18–19)	-	-	(Jordan) Al-Wehdat	v. Egypt, 31 July 2026
FW	Saad Al-Adwan	12 May 2007 (age 19)			(United Arab Emirates) Shabab Al Ahli	2026 WAFF U-20 Championship
FW	Mohammad Shehdeh				(Jordan) Etihad	2026 WAFF U-20 Championship
FW	Rami Al-Shboul	2007 (age 18–19)	-	-	(Jordan) Sahl Horan	v. Singapore, 16 February 2026
	Ahmad Al-Mohammadin		-	-	(Jordan)	September training camp
	Omar Mraihel				(Jordan)	September training camp
	Mohammad Yasser				(Jordan)	September training camp

- ^{INJ} Withdrew due to an injury.

== Coaching history ==
- (Jordan) Math'har Al-Saeed (1986-1989)
- (Denmark) Jan Poulsen (2006-2007)
- (Jordan) Ahmed Abdel-Qader (2007-2008)
- (Egypt) Mohammad Abdel-Azim (2009-2010)
- (Jordan) Jamal Abu Abed (2011-2012)
- (United States) Bibert Kaghado (2013-2014)
- (Jordan) Islam Al-Diabat (2015)
- (Jordan) Ahmed Abdel-Qader (2016-2018)
- (Jordan) Islam Al-Diabat (2021-2023)
- (Netherlands) Peter Meindertsma (2023-2025)
- (Jordan) Islam Al-Diabat (2025)
- (Jordan) Ibrahim Helmy (2026-)

== Kit providers ==
=== Kit sponsorship ===
Kit supplier	Period
(Germany) Jako	2006–2010
(Germany) Adidas	2011–2012
(Germany) Jako	2012–2015
(Germany) Adidas	2015–2018
(Spain) Joma	2018–2021
(England) Umbro	2021–2022
(Germany) Jako	2022–2024
(Spain) Kelme	2024–present

== Competitive record ==
=== FIFA U-20 World Cup ===
FIFA U-20 World Cup
Year	Result	Position	Pld	W	D	L	GF	GA	Squad
(Tunisia) 1977	Did not qualify								
(Japan) 1979	Did not qualify								
(Australia) 1981	Did not qualify								
(Mexico) 1983	Did not qualify								
(Soviet Union) 1985	Did not qualify								
(Chile) 1987	Did not qualify								
(Saudi Arabia) 1989	Did not qualify								
(Portugal) 1991	Did not qualify								
(Australia) 1993	Did not qualify								
(Qatar) 1995	Did not qualify								
(Malaysia) 1997	Did not qualify								
(Nigeria) 1999	Did not qualify								
(Argentina) 2001	Did not qualify								
(United Arab Emirates) 2003	Did not qualify								
(Netherlands) 2005	Did not qualify								
(Canada) 2007	Group stage	20th	3	0	1	2	3	6	Squad
(Egypt) 2009	Did not qualify								
(Colombia) 2011	Did not qualify								
(Turkey) 2013	Did not qualify								
(New Zealand) 2015	Did not qualify								
(South Korea) 2017	Did not qualify								
(Poland) 2019	Did not qualify								
(Argentina) 2023	Did not qualify								
(Chile) 2025	Did not qualify								
(Azerbaijan) (Uzbekistan) 2027	To be determined								
(Armenia) (Georgia (country)) 2029	To be determined								
Total	Group stage	20th	3	0	1	2	3	6	—

=== AFC U-20 Asian Cup ===
AFC U-20 Asian Cup record											Qualification record						
Host nation(s) and year	Round	Pos	Pld	W	D	L	GF	GA	Squad		Outcome	Pld	W	D	L	GF	GA
(Malaysia) 1959	Did not enter										Did not enter						
(Malaysia) 1960	Did not enter										Did not enter						
(Thailand) 1961	Did not enter										Did not enter						
(Thailand) 1962	Did not enter										Did not enter						
(Malaysia) 1963	Did not enter										Did not enter						
(South Vietnam) 1964	Did not enter										Did not enter						
(Japan) 1965	Did not enter										Did not enter						
(Philippines) 1966	Did not enter										Did not enter						
(Thailand) 1967	Did not enter										Did not enter						
(South Korea) 1968	Did not enter										Did not enter						
(Thailand) 1969	Did not enter										Did not enter						
(Philippines) 1970	Did not enter										Did not enter						
(Japan) 1971	Did not enter										Did not enter						
(Thailand) 1972	Did not enter										Did not enter						
(Iran) 1973	Did not enter										Did not enter						
(Thailand) 1974	Did not enter										Did not enter						
(Kuwait) 1975	Did not enter										Did not enter						
(Thailand) 1976	Did not enter										Did not enter						
(Iran) 1977	Group stage	10th	3	0	1	2	1	6									
(Bangladesh) 1978	Group stage	10th	3	0	0	3	0	13									
(Thailand) 1980	Did not enter										Did not enter						
(Thailand) 1982	Did not enter										Did not enter						
(United Arab Emirates) 1985	Did not enter										Did not enter						
(Saudi Arabia) 1986	Did not enter										Did not enter						
(Qatar) 1988	Did not enter										Did not enter						
(Indonesia) 1990	Did not enter										Did not enter						
(United Arab Emirates) 1992	Did not enter										Did not enter						
(Indonesia) 1994	Did not enter										Did not enter						
(South Korea) 1996	Did not qualify										Did not qualify						
(Thailand) 1998	Did not enter										Did not enter						
(Iran) 2000	Did not enter										Did not enter						
(Qatar) 2002	Did not qualify										3rd of 4	3	1	0	2	1	15
(Malaysia) 2004	Did not qualify										3rd of 3	2	0	0	2	0	3
(India) 2006	Fourth Place	4th	6	2	1	3	5	9	Squad		1st of 3	2	1	0	1	4	3
(Saudi Arabia) 2008	Group Stage	12th	3	0	0	3	3	6	Squad		3rd of 4	3	1	1	1	3	3
(China) 2010	Group Stage	13th	3	0	1	2	1	5	Squad		1st of 6	5	4	1	0	12	6
(United Arab Emirates) 2012	Quarter-finals	8th	4	1	2	1	8	8	Squad		3rd of 6	5	3	1	1	11	2
(Myanmar) 2014	Did not qualify										3rd of 5	4	1	1	2	3	5
(Bahrain) 2016	Did not qualify										3rd of 4	3	1	0	2	4	5
(Indonesia) 2018	Group Stage	10th	3	1	1	1	4	5	Squad		1st of 4	3	2	1	0	4	1
(Uzbekistan) 2020	Cancelled										2nd of 4	3	1	2	0	5	2
(Uzbekistan) 2023	Quarter-finals	8th	4	1	1	2	2	4	Squad		1st of 5	4	3	1	0	21	2
(China) 2025	Group Stage	9th	3	1	1	1	2	2	Squad		2nd of 4	3	2	0	1	11	3
(China) 2027	Qualified										2nd of 4	3	2	0	1	3	2
Total	Fourth Place	9/42	32	6	8	18	26	58	–	Total	–	43	22	8	13	82	52

=== U-20 Arab Cup ===
Arab Cup U-20 record
Host nation and year	Result	Pld	W	D	L	GF	GA
(Morocco) 1983	Group stage	3	0	1	2	2	7
(Algeria) 1985	Did not enter						
(Iraq) 1989	Group stage	3	0	0	3	0	8
(Morocco) 2011	Did not enter						
(Jordan) 2012	Group stage	3	0	2	1	1	2
(Qatar) ~~2014~~	Cancelled						
(Saudi Arabia) 2020	did not enter						
(Egypt) 2021	did not enter						
(Saudi Arabia) 2022	Quarter-finals	2	1	1	1	3	2
(Iraq) 2026	To be determined						
(Egypt) 2028	To be determined						
Total	Quarter-finals	11	1	4	7	6	23

=== WAFF U-20 Championship ===
WAFF U-20 Championship
Year	Result	Pld	W	D	L	GF	GA
(Palestine) 2019	3rd Place	4	3	0	1	11	2
(Iraq) 2021	Group stages	3	2	0	1	4	1
(Saudi Arabia) 2024	Semi-finals	4	2	1	1	6	1
(Kuwait) ~~2026~~	Cancelled						
Total	3rd Place	11	7	1	3	21	4

=== Exhibition ===
Exhibition game
Year	Tournament	Round	Position	GP	W	D	L	GF	GA
2025	(Indonesia) U-20 Challenge Series	Runners-up	2nd	3	2	0	1	7	5

== Head-to-head record ==
The following table shows Jordan's head-to-head record in the FIFA U-20 World Cup and AFC U-20 Asian Cup.

=== In FIFA U-20 World Cup ===
Opponent	Pld	W	D	L	GF	GA	GD	Win %
Spain	1	0	0	1	2	4	−2	0.00
Uruguay	1	0	0	1	0	1	−1	0.00
Zambia	1	0	1	0	1	1	+0	0.00
Total	3	0	1	2	3	6	−3	0.00

=== In AFC U-20 Asian Cup ===
Opponent	Pld	W	D	L	GF	GA	GD	Win %
Australia	3	0	1	2	2	6	−4	0.00
China	1	1	0	0	2	1	+1	100.00
India	1	1	0	0	3	2	+1	100.00
Indonesia	1	0	0	1	0	4	−4	0.00
Iraq	1	0	0	1	0	6	−6	0.00
Japan	2	0	0	2	0	5	−5	0.00
Malaysia	2	0	1	1	1	4	−3	0.00
North Korea	3	1	1	1	3	3	+0	33.33
Oman	1	0	1	0	0	0	+0	0.00
Saudi Arabia	2	0	0	2	0	3	−3	0.00
South Korea	5	0	0	5	1	13	−12	0.00
Kyrgyzstan	1	0	1	0	0	0	+0	0.00
Tajikistan	1	1	0	0	2	0	+2	100.00
Thailand	1	0	0	1	2	3	−1	0.00
United Arab Emirates	1	0	1	0	0	0	+0	0.00
Uzbekistan	2	0	1	1	2	3	−1	0.00
Vietnam	3	2	0	1	8	5	+3	66.67
Total	31	6	7	18	26	58	−32	19.35

== See also ==
- Jordan national football team
- Jordan national under-23 football team
- Jordan national under-17 football team
- Jordan women's national football team
- Jordan women's national under-20 football team
