= Lebanon national under-20 football team =

Lebanon under-20
- Nickname(s): شباب الأرز (The Youth Cedars)
- Association: Lebanese Football Association (LFA)
- Confederation: AFC (Asia)
- Sub-confederation: WAFF (West Asia)
- Head coach: Hassan Hassoun
- Home stadium: Various
- FIFA code: LBN
First colours	Second colours

First international
- Lebanon 0–0 India (Tehran, Iran; 14 April 1973)

Biggest win
- Lebanon 6–1 Singapore (Dushanbe, Tajikistan; 18 September 2022)

Biggest defeat
- Syria 6–0 Lebanon (Fujairah, United Arab Emirates; 2 November 2011)

AFC U-20 Asian Cup
- Appearances: 2 (first in 1973)
- Best result: Quarter-finals (1973)

Arab Cup U-20
- Appearances: 3 (first in 1985)
- Best result: Group stage (1985, 2021, 2022)

WAFF U-18 Championship
- Appearances: 2 (first in 2021)
- Best result: Runners-up (2021)

The Lebanon national under-20 football team (Arabic: منتخب لبنان تحت 20 سنة لكرة القدم) is the national under-20 football team of Lebanon and is controlled by the Lebanese Football Association. The team also serves as the national under-19 and national under-18 football teams of Lebanon.

While the team has never qualified for the FIFA U-20 World Cup, they have participated twice in the AFC U-20 Asian Cup, in 1973 and in 2008, with their best result being reaching the quarter-finals in the 1973 edition. In the 2021 WAFF U-18 Championship, the U18 team made history by becoming the first Lebanon men's national team to reach a final, losing to hosts Iraq on penalty-shootouts. They also participate in the Arab Cup U-20 and Jeux de la Francophonie, failing to go past the group stage in both competitions.

== Competitive record ==
=== FIFA U-20 World Cup ===
FIFA U-20 World Cup record										Qualification record						
Host nation(s) and year	Round	Pos	Pld	W	D	L	GF	GA	Squad	Outcome	Pld	W	D	L	GF	GA
(Tunisia) 1977	Did not enter									Did not enter						
(Japan) 1979	Did not enter									Did not enter						
(Australia) 1981	Did not enter									Did not enter						
(Mexico) 1983	Did not enter									Did not enter						
(Soviet Union) 1985	Did not enter									Did not enter						
(Chile) 1987	Did not enter									Did not enter						
(Saudi Arabia) 1989	Did not qualify									The 1988 AFC Youth Championship served as the qualifying tournament						
(Portugal) 1991	Did not qualify									The 1990 AFC Youth Championship served as the qualifying tournament						
(Australia) 1993	Did not qualify									The 1992 AFC Youth Championship served as the qualifying tournament						
(Qatar) 1995	Did not qualify									The 1994 AFC Youth Championship served as the qualifying tournament						
(Malaysia) 1997	Did not qualify									The 1996 AFC Youth Championship served as the qualifying tournament						
(Nigeria) 1999	Did not qualify									The 1998 AFC Youth Championship served as the qualifying tournament						
(Argentina) 2001	Did not qualify									The 2000 AFC Youth Championship served as the qualifying tournament						
(United Arab Emirates) 2003	Withdrew									Withdrew						
(Netherlands) 2005	Did not qualify									The 2004 AFC Youth Championship served as the qualifying tournament						
(Canada) 2007	Did not qualify									The 2006 AFC Youth Championship served as the qualifying tournament						
(Egypt) 2009	Did not qualify									The 2008 AFC U-19 Championship served as the qualifying tournament						
(Colombia) 2011	Withdrew									Withdrew						
(Turkey) 2013	Did not qualify									The 2012 AFC U-19 Championship served as the qualifying tournament						
(New Zealand) 2015	Did not qualify									The 2014 AFC U-19 Championship served as the qualifying tournament						
(South Korea) 2017	Did not qualify									The 2016 AFC U-19 Championship served as the qualifying tournament						
(Poland) 2019	Did not qualify									The 2018 AFC U-19 Championship served as the qualifying tournament						
(Argentina) 2023	Did not qualify									The 2023 AFC U-20 Asian Cup served as the qualifying tournament						
(Chile) 2025	Did not qualify									The 2025 AFC U-20 Asian Cup served as the qualifying tournament						
(Azerbaijan) (Uzbekistan) 2027	To be determined									The 2027 AFC U-20 Asian Cup will serve as the qualifying tournament						
Total	—	0/25	—	—	—	—	—	—	—	Total	—	—	—	—	—	—

=== AFC U-20 Asian Cup ===
AFC U-20 Asian Cup record										Qualification record						
Host nation(s) and year	Round	Pos	Pld	W	D	L	GF	GA	Squad	Outcome	Pld	W	D	L	GF	GA
(Malaysia) 1959	Did not enter									Did not enter						
(Malaysia) 1960	Did not enter									Did not enter						
(Thailand) 1961	Did not enter									Did not enter						
(Thailand) 1962	Did not enter									Did not enter						
(Malaysia) 1963	Did not enter									Did not enter						
(South Vietnam) 1964	Did not enter									Did not enter						
(Japan) 1965	Did not enter									Did not enter						
(Philippines) 1966	Did not enter									Did not enter						
(Thailand) 1967	Did not enter									Did not enter						
(South Korea) 1968	Did not enter									Did not enter						
(Thailand) 1969	Did not enter									Did not enter						
(Philippines) 1970	Did not enter									Did not enter						
(Japan) 1971	Did not enter									Did not enter						
(Thailand) 1972	Did not enter									Did not enter						
(Iran) 1973	Quarter-finals	5th of 14	4	1	3	0	3	1	Squad	Qualified as invitees						
(Thailand) 1974	Did not enter									Did not enter						
(Kuwait) 1975	Did not enter									Did not enter						
(Thailand) 1976	Did not enter									Did not enter						
(Iran) 1977	Did not enter									Did not enter						
(Bangladesh) 1978	Did not enter									Did not enter						
(Thailand) 1980	Did not enter									Did not enter						
(Thailand) 1982	Did not enter									Did not enter						
(United Arab Emirates) 1985	Did not enter									Did not enter						
(Saudi Arabia) 1986	Did not enter									Did not enter						
(Qatar) 1988	Did not qualify									3rd of 3	4	3	0	1	8	4
(Indonesia) 1990	Did not enter									Did not enter						
(United Arab Emirates) 1992	Did not qualify															
(Indonesia) 1994	Did not qualify															
(South Korea) 1996	Did not qualify									4th of 4	3	0	0	3	1	7
(Thailand) 1998	Did not qualify															
(Iran) 2000	Did not qualify									4th of 5	4	1	0	3	5	9
(Qatar) 2002	Withdrew									Withdrew						
(Malaysia) 2004	Did not qualify									3rd of 3	2	0	1	1	1	2
(India) 2006	Did not qualify									3rd of 3	2	0	0	2	1	6
(Saudi Arabia) 2008	Group stage	15th of 16	3	0	0	3	2	12	Squad	2nd of 6	5	4	0	1	10	4
(China) 2010	Withdrew									Withdrew						
(United Arab Emirates) 2012	Did not qualify									3rd of 5	4	2	0	2	3	8
(Myanmar) 2014	Did not qualify									3rd of 4	3	0	1	2	2	8
(Bahrain) 2016	Did not qualify									3rd of 4	3	1	1	1	4	5
(Indonesia) 2018	Did not qualify									3rd of 3	2	0	0	2	0	4
~~(Uzbekistan) 2020~~	Did not qualify									2nd of 4	3	1	1	1	3	2
(Uzbekistan) 2023	Did not qualify									2nd of 4	3	2	0	1	7	5
(China) 2025	Did not qualify									4th of 5	4	1	0	3	11	8
(China) 2027	Qualified									2nd of 3	2	1	0	1	5	5
Total	Best: quarter-finals	3/43	7	1	3	3	5	13	—	Total	44	16	4	24	61	77

=== Arab Cup U-20 ===
Arab Cup U-20 record
Host nation(s) and year	Round	Pos	Pld	W	D	L	GF	GA	Squad
(Morocco) 1983	Did not participate								
(Algeria) 1985	Group stage	9th of 12	2	1	0	1	1	1	—
(Iraq) 1989	Did not participate								
(Morocco) 2011	Did not participate								
(Jordan) 2012	Did not participate								
(Qatar) 2014	Cancelled								
(Saudi Arabia) 2020	Did not participate								
(Egypt) 2021	Group stage	15th of 16	3	0	0	3	2	10	—
(Saudi Arabia) 2022	Group stage	14th of 18	2	0	0	2	1	4	Squad
(Iraq) 2026	To be determined								
(Egypt) 2028	To be determined								
Total	Best: group stage	1/5	5	0	0	5	3	14	—

=== WAFF U-20 Championship ===
WAFF U-20 Championship record
Host nation(s) and year	Round	Pos	Pld	W	D	L	GF	GA	Squad
(Palestine) 2019	Did not participate								
(Iraq) 2021	Runners-up	2nd of 9	4	2	2	0	3	1	—
(Saudi Arabia) 2024	Group stage	12th of 12	3	0	0	3	0	6	—
(Kuwait) 2026	To be determined								
Total	Best: runners-up	2/3	7	2	2	3	3	7	—

=== Mediterranean Games ===
Mediterranean Games record
Host nation, city and year	Round	Pos	Pld	W	D	L	GF	GA	Squad
1951–1987	See Lebanon national football team								
(Greece) Athens 1991	See Lebanon national under-23 football team								
(France) Languedoc-Roussillon 1993	See Lebanon national under-23 football team								
(Italy) Bari 1997	See Lebanon national under-23 football team								
(Tunisia) Tunis 2001	See Lebanon national under-21 football team								
(Spain) Almería 2005	See Lebanon national under-23 football team								
(Italy) Pescara 2009	Did not participate								
(Turkey) Mersin 2013	Did not participate								
(Spain) Tarragona 2018	Did not participate								
(Algeria) Oran 2022	Did not participate								
(Italy) Taranto 2026	Did not participate								
(Kosovo) Pristina 2030	To be determined								
Total	—	0/4	—	—	—	—	—	—	—

=== Jeux de la Francophonie ===
Jeux de la Francophonie record
Host nation, city and year	Round	Pos	Pld	W	D	L	GF	GA	Squad
(Morocco) Casablanca 1989	Did not participate								
(France) Paris 1994	Did not participate								
(Madagascar) Antananarivo 1997	Did not participate								
(Canada) Ottawa 2001	Did not participate								
(Niger) Niamey 2005	Did not participate								
(Lebanon) Beirut 2009	Group stage	9th of 9	2	0	0	2	1	5	Squad
(France) Nice 2013	Group stage	14 of 14	3	0	0	3	1	10	Squad
(Ivory Coast) Abidjan 2017	Group stage	13 of 16	3	0	1	2	2	5	Squad
(Democratic Republic of the Congo) Kinshasa 2023	Group stage	8th of 9	2	0	1	1	1	6	Squad
Total	Best: group stage	4/9	10	0	2	8	5	26	—

== Results and fixtures ==
The following is a list of match results in the last 12 months, as well as any future matches that have been scheduled.

Win Draw Loss Fixture

=== 2026 ===
3 July 2026 Friendly	Lebanon	0–0	Syria	Tripoli, Lebanon
--:-- UTC+3		Report		Stadium: Tripoli Municipal Stadium

5 July 2026 Friendly	Lebanon	2–1	Syria	Tripoli, Lebanon
--:-- UTC+3	Fahes 55'; Fakih 89'	Report	76'	Stadium: Tripoli Municipal Stadium

21 August 2026 Friendly	Lebanon	0–1	Tajikistan	Tripoli, Lebanon
16:30 UTC+3		Report	77'	Stadium: Tripoli Municipal Stadium

24 August 2026 Friendly	Lebanon	2–2	Tajikistan	Tripoli, Lebanon
17:00 UTC+3	Kazan 41'; 44' (o.g.)	Report	24' (pen.); 56'	Stadium: Tripoli Municipal Stadium

31 August 2026 2027 Asian Cup qualification	Lebanon	2–3	South Korea	Bishkek, Kyrgyzstan
16:00 UTC+6	Kazan 36'; Saad 88'	Report	Kwon Jun-seong 40'; Kim Min-woo 45+4'; Lee Ho-jin 60'	Stadium: Dolen Omurzakov Stadium

3 September 2026 2027 Asian Cup qualification	Kyrgyzstan	2–3	Lebanon	Bishkek, Kyrgyzstan
20:00 UTC+6	Akylbekovich 45+1'; Bondarenko 90+5'	Report	Nicolas 5'; Makhmudzhanov 36' (o.g.); Bassil 90+8' (pen.)	Stadium: Dolen Omurzakov Stadium; Referee: Ahmed Kadhim Gatea (Iraq)

== Players ==
The following 23 players were called up for the 2027 AFC U-20 Asian Cup qualification matches against South Korea and Kyrgyzstan on 31 August and 3 September 2026, respectively.

No.	Pos.	Player	Date of birth (age)	Club
1	GK	Adam Orfali	12 September 2007 (age 19)	(Lebanese Football Association) Safa
22	GK	Andre Azoury	2 August 2008 (age 18)	(Lebanese Football Association) Athletico
23	GK	Ahmad Darwich	16 October 2007 (age 19)	(Lebanese Football Association) AM14
2	DF	Ali Zbeeb	18 September 2007 (age 19)	(Lebanese Football Association) Sagesse
3	DF	Omar El Khoury	17 July 2007 (age 19)	(Lebanese Football Association) Sagesse
4	DF	Fadel Assi	25 September 2007 (age 19)	(Lebanese Football Association) Shabab Sahel
5	DF	Marc Nicolas	30 September 2007 (age 19)	(Lebanese Football Association) Ahed
12	DF	Ali Kaawar	2 November 2008 (age 18)	(Lebanese Football Association) Nejmeh
13	DF	João Gabriel Maklouf	6 April 2007 (age 19)	(Italian Football Federation) Como
20	DF	Ahmad Haidar	27 February 2007 (age 19)	(Lebanese Football Association) Sagesse
6	MF	Gabriel Bassil	1 June 2007 (age 19)	(Lebanese Football Association) Ahed
7	MF	Hamza Tarhini	12 May 2007 (age 19)	(Lebanese Football Association) Safa
8	MF	Karim Jaafar	5 August 2007 (age 19)	(Royal Spanish Football Federation) Leganés
11	MF	Ali Al Rida Al Haj	28 August 2007 (age 19)	(Lebanese Football Association) Sagesse
14	MF	Ali Al Rida Atwi	16 October 2008 (age 18)	(Lebanese Football Association) Ahed
16	MF	Mohamad Saad	25 February 2008 (age 18)	(Lebanese Football Association) Shabab Sahel
9	FW	Mohamad Fawaz	4 January 2008 (age 18)	(Lebanese Football Association) Ahed
10	FW	Jimmy Kazan	6 March 2007 (age 19)	Free agent
15	FW	Charbel Assaf	3 January 2007 (age 19)	(Lebanese Football Association) Safa
17	FW	Mohamad Fakih	1 February 2008 (age 18)	(Lebanese Football Association) Nejmeh
18	FW	Mohamad Jawad Fahes	24 August 2008 (age 18)	(Lebanese Football Association) Shabab Sahel
19	FW	Karl El Zailaa	11 October 2007 (age 19)	(Lebanese Football Association) Sagesse
21	FW	Ali Haidar	9 May 2007 (age 19)	(Lebanese Football Association) Sagesse

== See also ==
- Lebanon national football team
- Lebanon national under-23 football team
- Lebanon national under-17 football team
- Lebanon women's national under-20 football team
- Football in Lebanon
