= Palestine national under-20 football team =

National association football team

Palestine Under-20
- Association: PFA
- Confederation: AFC (Asia)
- Sub-confederation: WAFF (West Asia)
- Head coach: Sajed Karakra
- Home stadium: Various
- FIFA code: PLE
First colours	Second colours

First international
- Iraq 3–1 Palestine (Al Ain, United Arab Emirates; 28 July 2002)

Biggest win
- Guam 0–5 Palestine (Muang Xai, Laos; 11 September 2022)

Biggest defeat
- Palestine 0–8 Japan (Muang Xai, Laos 16 September 2022)

FIFA U-20 World Cup
- Appearances: 0

AFC U-19 Championship
- Appearances: 0

The Palestine national under-20 football team (Arabic: منتخب فلسطين تحت 20 سنة لكرة القدم) is the national under-20 football team of Palestine and is controlled by the Palestinian Football Association. The team also serves as the national under-19 football team of Palestine.

The team has never qualified for the final tournaments of the FIFA U-20 World Cup or the AFC U-20 Asian Cup.

== History ==
In July 2022, Palestine beat Sudan in the Arab Cup 5–3 to achieve its first victory in the history of the tournament. Palestine missed out yet again on a chance for an AFC U-20 Asian Cup finals appearance despite recording two wins and a draw. However, they suffered a heavy defeat, their worst ever by Japan.

== Competitive record ==
=== FIFA U-20 World Cup ===
FIFA U-20 World Cup record										Qualification record						
Host nation(s) and year	Round	Pos	Pld	W	D	L	GF	GA	Squad	Outcome	Pld	W	D	L	GF	GA
(Tunisia) 1977	Did not enter									Did not enter						
(Japan) 1979	Did not enter									Did not enter						
(Australia) 1981	Did not enter									Did not enter						
(Mexico) 1983	Did not enter									Did not enter						
(Soviet Union) 1985	Did not enter									Did not enter						
(Chile) 1987	Did not enter									Did not enter						
(Saudi Arabia) 1989	Did not enter									Did not enter						
(Portugal) 1991	Did not enter									Did not enter						
(Australia) 1993	Did not enter									Did not enter						
(Qatar) 1995	Did not enter									Did not enter						
(Malaysia) 1997	Did not enter									Did not enter						
(Nigeria) 1999	Did not enter									Did not enter						
(Argentina) 2001	Did not enter									Did not enter						
(United Arab Emirates) 2003	Did not qualify									The 2002 AFC Youth Championship served as the qualifying tournament						
(Netherlands) 2005	Did not qualify									The 2004 AFC Youth Championship served as the qualifying tournament						
(Canada) 2007	Did not qualify									The 2006 AFC Youth Championship served as the qualifying tournament						
(Egypt) 2009	Disqualified									Disqualified						
(Colombia) 2011	Did not qualify									The 2010 AFC U-19 Championship served as the qualifying tournament						
(Turkey) 2013	Did not qualify									The 2012 AFC U-19 Championship served as the qualifying tournament						
(New Zealand) 2015	Did not qualify									The 2014 AFC U-19 Championship served as the qualifying tournament						
(South Korea) 2017	Did not qualify									The 2016 AFC U-19 Championship served as the qualifying tournament						
(Poland) 2019	Did not qualify									The 2018 AFC U-19 Championship served as the qualifying tournament						
(Argentina) 2023	Did not qualify									The 2023 AFC U-20 Asian Cup served as the qualifying tournament						
(Chile) 2025	Did not qualify									The 2025 AFC U-20 Asian Cup served as the qualifying tournament						
(Azerbaijan) (Uzbekistan) 2027	To be determined									The 2027 AFC U-20 Asian Cup will serve as the qualifying tournament						
Total	–	0/25	–	–	–	–	–	–	–	Total	–	–	–	–	–	–

=== AFC U-20 Asian Cup ===
AFC U-20 Asian Cup record											Qualification record						
Host nation(s) and year	Round	Pos	Pld	W	D	L	GF	GA	Squad		Outcome	Pld	W	D	L	GF	GA
(Malaysia) 1959	Did not enter										Did not enter						
(Malaysia) 1960	Did not enter										Did not enter						
(Thailand) 1961	Did not enter										Did not enter						
(Thailand) 1962	Did not enter										Did not enter						
(Malaysia) 1963	Did not enter										Did not enter						
(South Vietnam) 1964	Did not enter										Did not enter						
(Japan) 1965	Did not enter										Did not enter						
(Philippines) 1966	Did not enter										Did not enter						
(Thailand) 1967	Did not enter										Did not enter						
(South Korea) 1968	Did not enter										Did not enter						
(Thailand) 1969	Did not enter										Did not enter						
(Philippines) 1970	Did not enter										Did not enter						
(Japan) 1971	Did not enter										Did not enter						
(Thailand) 1972	Did not enter										Did not enter						
(Iran) 1973	Did not enter										Did not enter						
(Thailand) 1974	Did not enter										Did not enter						
(Kuwait) 1975	Did not enter										Did not enter						
(Thailand) 1976	Did not enter										Did not enter						
(Iran) 1977	Did not enter										Did not enter						
(Bangladesh) 1978	Did not enter										Did not enter						
(Thailand) 1980	Did not enter										Did not enter						
(Thailand) 1982	Did not enter										Did not enter						
(United Arab Emirates) 1985	Did not enter										Did not enter						
(Saudi Arabia) 1986	Did not enter										Did not enter						
(Qatar) 1988	Did not enter										Did not enter						
(Indonesia) 1990	Did not enter										Did not enter						
(United Arab Emirates) 1992	Did not enter										Did not enter						
(Indonesia) 1994	Did not enter										Did not enter						
(South Korea) 1996	Did not enter										Did not enter						
(Thailand) 1998	Did not enter										Did not enter						
(Iran) 2000	Did not enter										Did not enter						
(Qatar) 2002	Did not qualify										3rd of 3	2	0	0	2	3	8
(Malaysia) 2004	Did not qualify										3rd of 3	2	0	0	2	2	13
(India) 2006	Did not qualify										3rd of 3	2	0	0	2	0	9
(Saudi Arabia) 2008	Disqualified										Disqualified						
(China) 2010	Did not qualify										3rd of 5	5	1	1	3	7	11
(United Arab Emirates) 2012	Did not qualify										5th of 5	4	0	0	4	1	6
(Myanmar) 2014	Did not qualify										2nd of 3	2	0	1	1	1	2
(Bahrain) 2016	Did not qualify										2nd of 4	3	2	0	1	3	5
(Indonesia) 2018	Did not qualify										3rd of 3	3	0	0	3	2	9
(Uzbekistan) 2020	Did not qualify										3rd of 5	4	2	1	1	10	7
(Uzbekistan) 2023	Did not qualify										3rd of 5	4	2	1	1	8	10
(China) 2025	Did not qualify										4th of 5	4	0	2	2	2	4
Total	–	0/42	–	–	–	–	–	–	–	Total	–	35	7	6	22	39	84

=== Arab Cup U-20 ===
Arab Cup U-20 record
Host nation(s) and year	Round	Pos	Pld	W	D	L	GF	GA	Squad
(Morocco) 2011	Group stage	9 of 10	4	0	0	4	1	8	Squad
(Jordan) 2012	Did not participate								
(Qatar) 2014	Cancelled								
(Saudi Arabia) 2020	Group stage	15 of 16	3	0	0	3	2	9	Squad
(Egypt) 2021	Did not participate								
(Saudi Arabia) 2022	Semi-finals	4 of 18	4	1	1	2	6	10	Squad
(Iraq) 2026	To be determined								
(Egypt) 2028	To be determined								
Total	Best: Semi-finals	3 / 5	11	1	1	9	9	27	–

== Recent results and matches ==
9 July 2026 Friendly	Bahrain	1–0	Palestine	Bahrain

12 July 2026 Friendly	Bahrain	0–2	Palestine	Bahrain
			Hamade; Abou-Chaker

15 July 2026 Friendly	Bahrain	3–2	Palestine	Bahrain
	(pen.); 90+9' (pen.)		Mahmoud

17 August 2026 Friendly	Saudi Arabia	4–0	Palestine	Doha, Qatar

21 August 2026 Friendly	Qatar	2–2	Palestine	Doha, Qatar
	Frikh (pen.); Ibrahim (pen.)		Mahmoud	Stadium: Abdullah bin Khalifa Stadium

31 August 2026 2027 U-20 Asian Cup qualification	Iran	2–1	Palestine	Phú Thọ, Vietnam
16:00 UTC+7	Chesmberah 51'; Khodadadian 71'	Report	Abou-Chaker 90+1'	Stadium: Việt Trì Stadium; Referee: Mongkolchai Pechsri (Thailand)

3 September 2026 2027 U-20 Asian Cup qualification	Palestine	2–1	Vietnam	Phú Thọ, Vietnam
19:00 UTC+7	Tayem 34'; Hamade 82'	Report	Nguyễn Quốc Khánh 66'	Stadium: Việt Trì Stadium; Referee: Sami Al-Ismail (Saudi Arabia)

6 September 2026 2027 U-20 Asian Cup qualification	North Korea	4–0	Palestine	Phú Thọ, Vietnam
16:00 UTC+7	Kim Yu-jin 50'; An Jin-sok 54'; Pak Kwang-song 56'; Ko Myong-ryong 90'	Report		Stadium: Việt Trì Stadium; Referee: Ismaeel Habib Ali (Bahrain)

== Players ==
=== Current squad ===
The following 23 players were called up for the 2027 AFC U-20 Asian Cup qualification matches against Iran, Vietnam, and North Korea, on 31 August, 3 and 6 September 2026; respectively.

No.	Pos.	Player	Date of birth (age)	Club
	GK	Diogo Samara	3 January 2007 (age 19)	(Brazilian Football Confederation) Azuriz FC U20
	GK	Hamza Sobhieh	13 August 2009 (age 17)	(Norwegian Football Federation) Stabæk Youth
	GK	Baker Dabboura	30 January 2007 (age 19)	Free agent
	DF	Mahmoud Aysar	29 August 2008 (age 18)	(Football Association of Finland) JJK
	DF	Odai Al-Nasaseebi	27 March 2008 (age 18)	(Hellenic Football Federation) Panathinaikos U21
	DF	Talal Ahmad	1 January 2009 (age 17)	(Lebanese Football Association) Al-Abbasieh
	DF	Omar Badawi	15 May 2007 (age 19)	(United Arab Emirates Football Association) Al Ain U21
	DF	Aiham Dahche	13 April 2007 (age 19)	(Italian Football Federation) Monopoli Primavera
	DF	Yahya Marraty	10 January 2007 (age 19)	(Danish Football Association) Aarhus Fremad II
	DF	Musab Mubarak	30 August 2007 (age 19)	(Jordan Football Association) Etihad
	DF	Moataz Abdullah Taleb	3 January 2008 (age 18)	(Palestinian Football Association) Thaqafi Tulkarem
	MF	Leon Al-Nasaseebi	27 March 2008 (age 18)	Free agent
	MF	Saleem Halabieh	28 October 2007 (age 19)	(Palestinian Football Association) Hilal Al-Quds
	MF	Omar Badarneh	27 September 2007 (age 19)	(Austrian Football Association) Rapid Wien II
	MF	Bilal Obeid	19 November 2007 (age 18)	(United States Soccer Federation) Detroit City
	MF	Laith Taiem	12 February 2007 (age 19)	(United Arab Emirates Football Association) Al Jazira U21
	MF	Ahmed Yaqub	31 January 2007 (age 19)	(German Football Association) SV Waldhof Mannheim U21
	MF	Bilal Yousef	4 August 2007 (age 19)	Free agent
	FW	Jasin Abou-Chaker	10 August 2007 (age 19)	(German Football Association) BFC Preussen
	FW	Suheib-Elias Ali	13 March 2007 (age 19)	(German Football Association) Hannover 96 II
	FW	Ahmad Badran	13 March 2007 (age 19)	Free agent
	FW	Zaki Hamade	17 April 2008 (age 18)	(Danish Football Association) Roskilde
	FW	Bakir Mahmoud	13 March 2007 (age 19)	(German Football Association) Rot-Weiss Essen U19

=== Recent call-ups ===
The following players have been called up within the last 12 months and remain eligible for selection.

No.	Pos.	Player	Date of birth (age)	Club
	DF	Adam Eljaouni	4 February 2008 (age 18)	(Swedish Football Association) AIK
	DF	Mohammed Nouri	16 April 2007 (age 19)	(Palestinian Football Association) Markaz Askar
	MF	Tawfik Jomah	10 August 2007 (age 19)	(Swedish Football Association) Vasalund IF
	MF	Mohamad Al-Dalow	10 February 2007 (age 19)	Free agent
	MF	Bakir Mahmoud	7 January 2008 (age 18)	(German Football Association) Rot-Weiss Essen U19
	FW	Fouad Hbous	6 February 2007 (age 19)	(Lebanese Football Association) Al-Ansar FC U19
	FW	Saleem Halabieh	27 September 2007 (age 19)	(Palestinian Football Association) Hilal Al-Quds

== See also ==
- Palestine national football team
- Palestine national under-23 football team
- Palestine national under-17 football team
- Palestine women's national football team
- Football in Palestine
