= 2027 AFC U-20 Asian Cup =

2027年亚足联U-20亚洲杯

Tournament details
- Host country: China
- Dates: 24 March – 10 April
- Teams: 16 (from 1 confederation)
- Venues: 4 (in 1 host city)

The 2027 AFC U-20 Asian Cup will be the 43rd edition of the AFC U-20 Asian Cup (including previous editions of the AFC Youth Championship and AFC U-19 Championship), the biennial international youth football championship organised by the Asian Football Confederation (AFC) for the men's under-20 national teams of Asia. It is the second of three consecutive U-20 Asian Cups held in China from 2025 to 2029.

On 3 December 2025, the AFC announced that China will host the tournament for the second consecutive time after hosting it in 2025.

A total of 16 teams will play in the tournament. The top four teams will qualify for the 2027 FIFA U-20 World Cup in Azerbaijan and Uzbekistan as the AFC representatives besides Uzbekistan which automatically qualified as co-host. In addition, the next best-placed team will qualify for the Inter-confederation play-off tournament.

Australia were the defending champions but failed to qualify marking the first time ever Australia has not participated in the tournament and the first time since Iraq in 2002 that a defending champion failed to defend their title by failing to qualify.

On the other hand, this edition of the U-20 Asian Cup will be the first time that India will return to the tournament since the 2006 edition where they competed as hosts.

== Venues ==
The competition will be held in Hangzhou. Four venues are proposed for use in this tournament.

Hangzhou
Xihu	Shangcheng	Linping	Xiaoshan
Huanglong Sports Centre Stadium	Shangcheng Sports Centre Stadium	Linping Sports Centre Stadium	Xiaoshan Sports Centre Stadium
Capacity: 51,971	Capacity: 13,544	Capacity: 10,200	Capacity: 10,118
2027 AFC U-20 Asian Cup is located in China

== Qualification ==
=== Qualified teams ===
A total of 16 teams, including hosts China, qualified for the final tournament.

Team	Qualified as	Appearance	Previous best performance
China	Hosts	21st	Champions (1985)
South Korea	Group A winners	38th	Champions (Twelve times) (Note: South Korea has won in 1959, 1960, 1963, 1978, 1980, 1982, 1990, 1996, 1998, 2002, 2004 and 2012.)
Uzbekistan	Group B winners	10th	Champions (2023)
North Korea	Group C winners	14th	Champions (1976, 2006, 2010)
Tajikistan	Group D winners	6th	Quarter-finalists (2016, 2018)
Saudi Arabia	Group E winners	16th	Champions (1986, 1992, 2018)
Iraq	Group F winners	20th	Champions (Five times) (Note: Iraq has won in 1975, 1977, 1978, 1988 and 2000.)
Japan	Group G winners	39th	Champions (2016)
Indonesia	Group H winners	21st	Champions (1961)
Lebanon	Best runners-up	3rd	Quarter-finalists (1973)
Oman	2nd-best runners-up	4th	Group stage (2000, 2014, 2023)
Iran	3rd-best runners-up	22nd	Champions (Four times) (Note: Iran has won in 1973, 1974 (Title shared with India), 1975 and 1976.)
Jordan	4th-best runners-up	10th	Fourth place (2006)
Thailand	5th-best runners-up	35th	Champions (1962, 1969)
India	6th-best runners-up	22nd	Champions (1974) (Note: title shared with Iran.)
Malaysia	7th-best runners-up	24th	Runners-up (1959, 1960, 1968)

== Draw ==
The 16 teams were drawn into four groups of four teams, with the teams seeded according to their performance in the 2025 AFC U-20 Asian Cup and 2027 AFC U-20 Asian Cup qualification, with the hosts China automatically seeded and assigned to Position A1 in the draw.

Pot 1	Pot 2	Pot 3	Pot 4
1. China (hosts); 2. South Korea; 3. Japan; 4. Saudi Arabia	5. Uzbekistan; 6. Iraq; 7. Iran; 8. Jordan	9. Indonesia; 10. Thailand; 11. Tajikistan; 12. Oman	13. India; 14. North Korea; 15. Malaysia; 16. Lebanon

== Squads ==
Players born on or after 1 January 2007 and on or before 31 December 2011 were eligible to compete in the tournament. Each team must register a squad of minimum 18 players and maximum 23 players, minimum three of whom must be goalkeepers.

== Group stage ==
Tiebreakers

Teams were ranked according to points (3 points for a win, 1 point for a draw, 0 points for a loss), and if tied on points, the following tie-breaking criteria were applied, in the order given, to determine the rankings:

1. Points in head-to-head matches among tied teams;
2. Goal difference in head-to-head matches among tied teams;
3. Goals scored in head-to-head matches among tied teams;
4. If more than two teams are tied, and after applying all head-to-head criteria above, a subset of teams are still tied, all head-to-head criteria above are reapplied exclusively to this subset of teams;
5. Goal difference in all group matches;
6. Goals scored in all group matches;
7. Penalty shoot-out if only two teams were tied and they met in the last round of the group;
8. Disciplinary points (yellow card = 1 point, red card as a result of two yellow cards = 3 points, direct red card = 3 points, yellow card followed by direct red card = 4 points);
9. Drawing of lots.

All match times are in local time, (UTC+8)

=== Group A ===
Pos	Team	Pld	W	D	L	GF	GA	GD	Pts	Qualification
1	China	0	0	0	0	0	0	0	0	Knockout stage
2	A2	0	0	0	0	0	0	0	0	Knockout stage
3	A3	0	0	0	0	0	0	0	0	
4	A4	0	0	0	0	0	0	0	0	

Source: AFC
Rules for classification: Tiebreakers

=== Group B ===
Pos	Team	Pld	W	D	L	GF	GA	GD	Pts	Qualification
1	B1	0	0	0	0	0	0	0	0	Knockout stage
2	B2	0	0	0	0	0	0	0	0	Knockout stage
3	B3	0	0	0	0	0	0	0	0	
4	B4	0	0	0	0	0	0	0	0	

Source: AFC
Rules for classification: Tiebreakers

=== Group C ===
Pos	Team	Pld	W	D	L	GF	GA	GD	Pts	Qualification
1	C1	0	0	0	0	0	0	0	0	Knockout stage
2	C2	0	0	0	0	0	0	0	0	Knockout stage
3	C3	0	0	0	0	0	0	0	0	
4	C4	0	0	0	0	0	0	0	0	

Source: AFC
Rules for classification: Tiebreakers

=== Group D ===
Pos	Team	Pld	W	D	L	GF	GA	GD	Pts	Qualification
1	D1	0	0	0	0	0	0	0	0	Knockout stage
2	D2	0	0	0	0	0	0	0	0	Knockout stage
3	D3	0	0	0	0	0	0	0	0	
4	D4	0	0	0	0	0	0	0	0	

Source: AFC
Rules for classification: Tiebreakers

== Knockout stage ==
In the knockout stage, extra time and penalty shoot-out are used to decide the winner if necessary.

=== Bracket ===
Quarter-finals
March
Winners Group A
Runners-up Group B
March
Winners Group C
Runners-up Group D
March
Winners Group B
Runners-up Group A
March
Winners Group D
Runners-up Group C

Semi-finals
April
Winner QF1
Winner QF2
April
Winner QF3
Winner QF4

Final
10 April
Winner SF1
Winner SF2

=== Quarter-finals ===
Winners qualified for the 2027 FIFA U-20 World Cup. If Uzbekistan advances to the semi-finals, the losing teams will have to play a repechage knockout.

March 2027
--:--

Winners Group B	Match 26	Runners-up Group A

March 2027
--:--

Winners Group A	Match 25	Runners-up Group B

March 2027
--:--

Winners Group C	Match 27	Runners-up Group D

March 2027
--:--

Winners Group D	Match 28	Runners-up Group C

=== Semi-finals ===
April 2027
--:--

Winners Match 26	Match 30	Winners Match 28

April 2027
--:--

Winners Match 25	Match 29	Winners Match 27

=== Final ===
10 April 2027
--:--

Winners Match 29	Match 31	Winners Match 30

== Qualified teams for FIFA U-20 World Cup ==
The following five teams from AFC qualified for the 2027 FIFA U-20 World Cup, including Uzbekistan which qualified as co-host. One team advanced to the inter-confederation play-off tournament.

Team	Qualified on	Qualified as	Previous appearances in FIFA U-20 World Cup^{1}
Uzbekistan	2 October 2025	Host	5 (2003, 2009, 2013, 2015, 2023)
	March 2027	Winner QF1	
	March 2027	Winner QF2	
	March 2027	Winner QF3	
	March 2027	Winner QF4	

^{1} Bold indicates champions for that year. Italic indicates hosts for that year.

== See also ==
- 2027 AFC U-17 Asian Cup
