= 1983 Palestine Cup of Nations for Youth =

1983 Palestine Cup for Youth
كأس فلسطين للشباب 1983

Tournament details
- Host country: Morocco
- Dates: 23 July - 7 August 1983
- Venues: 2 (in 2 host cities)

Final positions
- Champions: Iraq (1st title)
- Runners-up: Saudi Arabia
- Third place: Morocco
- Fourth place: United Arab Emirates

Tournament statistics
- Top scorer: (Iraq) Ahmed Radhi (6 goals)
- Best player: (Iraq) Ahmed Radhi

The 1983 Palestine Cup of Nations for Youth was the first edition of the Arab Cup U-20, it was held in Casablanca, Morocco. The tournament concerned youth teams of the Arab world. Iraq won this first edition beating Saudi Arabia in the final.

== Participated teams ==
The participated teams are:

- Algeria
- Bahrain
- Iraq
- Jordan
- Saudi Arabia
- Kuwait
- Libya
- Morocco (hosts)
- North Yemen
- Oman
- Palestine
- Qatar
- South Yemen
- Syria
- Tunisia
- United Arab Emirates

Withrawal teams:

- Mauritania (withdrew)

== Venues ==
Cities	Venues	Capacity
Casablanca	Stade Mohammed V	60,000
Kenitra	Stade Municipal	15,000

== First group stage ==
=== Group A ===
Team	Pld	W	D	L	GF	GA	GD	Pts
Morocco	3	2	1	0	4	1	+3	5
Syria	3	2	1	0	3	1	+2	5
Palestine	3	1	0	2	2	4	-2	2
South Yemen	3	0	0	3	1	4	-3	0

24 July 1983

Syria	1–1	Morocco

Stade Belvédère, Rabat

28 July 1983

Morocco	1–0	South Yemen

Stade Belvédère, Rabat

29 July 1983

Morocco	2–0	Palestine

Stade Belvédère, Rabat

29 July 1983

South Yemen	0–1	Syria

Stade Belvédère, Rabat

30 July 1983

Palestine	2–1	South Yemen

Stade Belvédère, Rabat

31 July 1983

Syria	1–0	Palestine

Stade Belvédère, Rabat

=== Group B ===
Team	Pld	W	D	L	GF	GA	GD	Pts
Iraq	3	2	1	0	7	1	+1	5
Saudi Arabia	3	2	0	1	6	4	+2	4
Oman	3	1	0	2	3	8	-5	2
Bahrain	3	0	1	2	2	5	-3	1

25 August 1983

Iraq	0–0	Bahrain

Stade Municipal, Kenitra

26 August 1983

Saudi Arabia	1–2	Iraq
?		Radhi

Stade Municipal, Kenitra

27 August 1983

Bahrain	1–2	Oman

Stade Municipal, Kenitra

28 August 1983

Oman	1–2	Saudi Arabia

Stade Municipal, Kenitra

30 August 1983

Iraq	5–0	Oman
Hadi; Radhi; Hussein

Stade Municipal, Kenitra

31 August 1983

Saudi Arabia	3–1	Bahrain

Stade Municipal, Kenitra

=== Group C ===
Team	Pld	W	D	L	GF	GA	GD	Pts
Qatar	3	2	1	0	5	1	+4	5
United Arab Emirates	3	1	1	1	2	1	+1	3
North Yemen	3	1	1	1	2	2	0	3
Jordan	3	0	1	2	2	7	-5	3

25 July 1983

Qatar	4–1	Jordan

Stade Municipal, Kénitra

26 July 1983

United Arab Emirates	0–1	North Yemen

Stade Municipal, Kénitra

27 July 1983

Qatar	1–0	North Yemen

Stade Municipal, Kénitra

27 July 1983

Jordan	0–2	United Arab Emirates

Stade Municipal, Kénitra

29 July 1983

North Yemen	1–1	Jordan

Stade Municipal, Kénitra

29 July 1983

United Arab Emirates	0–0	Qatar

Stade Municipal, Kénitra

=== Group D ===
Team	Pld	W	D	L	GF	GA	GD	Pts
Algeria	3	1	2	0	4	3	+1	4
Tunisia	3	1	2	0	2	1	+1	4
Kuwait	3	1	0	2	5	5	0	2
Libya	3	0	2	1	3	5	-2	2

26 July 1983

Algeria	3–2	Kuwait

Stade Municipal, Settat

27 July 1983

Tunisia	1–1	Libya

Stade Municipal, Settat

28 July 1983

Tunisia	1–0	Kuwait

Stade Municipal, Settat

28 July 1983

Libya	1–1	Algeria

Stade Municipal, Settat

30 July 1983

Algeria	0–0	Tunisia

Stade Municipal, Settat

31 July 1983

Kuwait	3–1	Libya

Stade Municipal, Settat

== Second group stage ==
=== Group A ===
Team	Pld	W	D	L	GF	GA	GD	Pts
Saudi Arabia	3	2	0	1	3	1	+2	4
Morocco	3	2	0	1	3	2	+1	4
Qatar	3	1	1	1	2	2	0	0
Tunisia	3	0	1	2	1	4	-3	0

1 August 1983

Morocco	0–2	Saudi Arabia

Stade El Bachir, Mohammédia

1 August 1983

Qatar	1–1	Tunisia

Stade El Bachir, Mohammédia

3 August 1983

Morocco	1–0	Qatar

Stade El Bachir, Mohammédia

3 August 1983

Saudi Arabia	1–0	Tunisia

Stade El Bachir, Mohammédia

5 August 1983

Morocco	2–0	Tunisia

Stade El Bachir, Mohammédia

5 August 1983

Qatar	1–0	Saudi Arabia

Stade El Bachir, Mohammédia

=== Group B ===
Team	Pld	W	D	L	GF	GA	GD	Pts
Iraq	3	2	1	0	8	3	+5	5
United Arab Emirates	3	2	1	0	3	1	+2	5
Algeria	3	0	1	2	4	7	-3	1
Syria	3	0	1	2	2	6	-4	1

1 August 1983

Syria	0–3	Iraq
?		Munir; Mahmoud

Stade Municipal, Kénitra

1 August 1983

United Arab Emirates	1–0	Algeria

Stade Municipal, Kénitra

3 August 1983

Syria	0–1	United Arab Emirates

Stade Municipal, Kénitra

3 August 1983

Iraq	4–2	Algeria
Munir; Moussa; Mahmoud		? ?

Stade Municipal, Kénitra

5 August 1983

Algeria	2–2	Syria

Stade Municipal, Kénitra

5 August 1983

Iraq	1–1	United Arab Emirates
Mahmoud		?

Stade Municipal, Kénitra

== Seventh Place Match ==
6 August 1983

Tunisia	0–1	Syria

Stade El Bachir, Mohammédia

== Fifth Place Match ==
6 August 1983

Qatar	1–2	Algeria

Stade El Bachir, Mohammédia

== Third Place Match ==
7 August 1983

Morocco	2–0	United Arab Emirates

Stade Mohammed V, Casablanca

== Final ==
7 August 1983

Saudi Arabia	0–1 (a.e.t.)	Iraq
		Radhi 107'

Stade Mohammed V, Casablanca
Attendance: 35 000
