= GFF U-20 Gulf Cup =

- Founded: 2015
- Teams: 8
- Current champions: Saudi Arabia (2nd title)
- Most championships: Saudi Arabia (2 titles)
- Website: the-gff.com
- 2025 AGCFF U-20 Gulf Cup

The GFF U-20 Gulf Cup (Arabic: كأس الخليج تحت 20 عامًا), formerly known as the GCC U-19 Championship, is a regional football competition governed by the Gulf Football Federation (GFF). The tournament was founded by the Gulf Cooperation Council (GCC), and the first edition of the tournament was expected to be held in Qatar in 2012, however it was eventually played 2015 with the second edition once again hosted by Qatar in 2016.

The tournament was relaunched by the AGCFF (now known as the GFF) in 2025, featuring eight teams.

== Records ==
Season	Host	Winner	Score	Runner-up	Third	Score	Fourth
GCC U-19 Championship
2015	Qatar	Oman	1–1 (5–3 pens.)	Bahrain	Kuwait	1–0	Saudi Arabia
2016	Qatar	Saudi Arabia	round-robin	Oman	United Arab Emirates	round-robin	Qatar
AGCFF U-20 Gulf Cup
2025	Saudi Arabia	Saudi Arabia	3–1	Yemen	Iraq and Oman		
