= 1985 Palestine Cup of Nations for Youth =

كأس فلسطين للشباب

Tournament details
- Host country: Algeria
- Dates: 15 September – 1 October
- Teams: 12 (from 2 confederations)
- Venues: 4 (in 4 host cities)

Final positions
- Champions: Saudi Arabia (1st title)
- Runners-up: Algeria
- Third place: Iraq
- Fourth place: Tunisia

Tournament statistics
- Matches played: 28
- Goals scored: 66 (2.36 per match)
- Top scorer(s): (Tunisia) Kais Yâakoubi (5 goals)
- Best goalkeeper: (Lebanon) Hamimi Al Rabee
- Fair play award: Syria

The 1985 Palestine Cup of Nations for Youth was the second edition of the Arab Cup U-20. The tournament was held in four cities in Algeria, from 15 September to 1 October 1985.

== Participating teams ==
- Algeria
- Iraq (holders)
- Lebanon
- Mauritania
- Morocco
- Palestine
- Qatar
- Saudi Arabia
- South Yemen
- Syria
- Tunisia
- United Arab Emirates

== Venues ==
1985 Palestine Cup of Nations for Youth is located in Algeria	Algiers	Sidi Bel Abbès
1985 Palestine Cup of Nations for Youth is located in Algeria	Stade du 5 Juillet	24 February Stadium
1985 Palestine Cup of Nations for Youth is located in Algeria	Capacity: 80,000	Capacity: 45,000
1985 Palestine Cup of Nations for Youth is located in Algeria	Tlemcen	Batna
1985 Palestine Cup of Nations for Youth is located in Algeria	Colonel Lotfi Stadium	1 November 1954 Stadium
1985 Palestine Cup of Nations for Youth is located in Algeria	Capacity: 20,000	Capacity: 20,000

== First group stage ==
The top two teams of each group advanced to the second group stage (quarter-finals).

=== Group A ===
Pos	Team	Pld	W	D	L	GF	GA	GD	Pts	Qualification
1	Algeria (H)	2	2	0	0	5	1	+4	4	Advance to second group stage
2	United Arab Emirates	2	1	0	1	2	4	−2	2	Advance to second group stage
3	Mauritania	2	0	0	2	2	4	−2	0	

Rules for classification: Group stage tiebreakers
(H) Hosts
15 September 1985

Algeria	2–1	Mauritania

Stade du 5 Juillet, Algiers

18 September 1985

United Arab Emirates	2–1	Mauritania

Stade du 5 Juillet, Algiers

20 September 1985

Algeria	3–0	United Arab Emirates
Nacer Sandjak

Stade du 5 Juillet, Algiers

=== Group B ===
Pos	Team	Pld	W	D	L	GF	GA	GD	Pts	Qualification
1	Iraq	2	1	1	0	4	0	+4	3	Advance to second group stage
2	Qatar	2	1	0	1	2	4	−2	2	Advance to second group stage
3	Morocco	2	0	1	1	0	2	−2	1	

Rules for classification: Group stage tiebreakers
17 September 1985

Iraq	0–0	Morocco

1 November 1954 Stadium, Batna

19 September 1985

Qatar	2–0	Morocco

1 November 1954 Stadium, Batna

21 September 1985

Qatar	0–4	Iraq

1 November 1954 Stadium, Batna

=== Group C ===
Pos	Team	Pld	W	D	L	GF	GA	GD	Pts	Qualification
1	Saudi Arabia	2	1	1	0	2	0	+2	3	Advance to second group stage
2	Tunisia	2	1	0	1	2	3	−1	2	Advance to second group stage
3	South Yemen	2	0	1	1	1	2	−1	1	

Rules for classification: Group stage tiebreakers
17 September 1985

Saudi Arabia	0–0	South Yemen

24 February Stadium, Sidi Bel Abbès

19 September 1985

Tunisia	2–1	South Yemen

24 February Stadium, Sidi Bel Abbès

21 September 1985

Saudi Arabia	2–0	Tunisia

24 February Stadium, Sidi Bel Abbès

=== Group D ===
Pos	Team	Pld	W	D	L	GF	GA	GD	Pts	Qualification
1	Syria	2	1	0	1	3	3	0	2	Advance to second group stage
2	Palestine	2	1	0	1	3	3	0	2	Advance to second group stage
3	Lebanon	2	1	0	1	1	1	0	2	

Rules for classification: Group stage tiebreakers
16 September 1985

Palestine	2–3	Syria

Stade Akid Lotfi, Tlemcen

18 September 1985

Syria	0–1	Lebanon

Stade Akid Lotfi, Tlemcen

20 September 1985

Lebanon	0–1	Palestine

Stade Akid Lotfi, Tlemcen

== Second group stage ==
=== Group A ===
Pos	Team	Pld	W	D	L	GF	GA	GD	Pts	Qualification
1	Saudi Arabia	3	3	0	0	6	0	+6	6	Advance to semi-finals
2	Algeria (H)	3	2	0	1	5	2	+3	4	Advance to semi-finals
3	Qatar	3	1	0	2	2	3	−1	2	
4	Palestine	3	0	0	3	2	10	−8	0	

Rules for classification: Group stage tiebreakers
(H) Hosts
23 September 1985

Saudi Arabia	4–0	Palestine

Stade du 5 Juillet, Algiers
23 September 1985

Algeria	1–0	Qatar

Stade du 5 Juillet, Algiers

25 September 1985

Algeria	4–1	Palestine

Stade du 5 Juillet, Algiers
25 September 1985

Qatar	0–1	Saudi Arabia

Stade du 5 Juillet, Algiers

27 September 1985

Algeria	0–1	Saudi Arabia

Stade du 5 Juillet, Algiers
27 September 1985

Palestine	1–2	Qatar

Stade du 5 Juillet, Algiers

=== Group B ===
Pos	Team	Pld	W	D	L	GF	GA	GD	Pts	Qualification
1	Iraq	3	2	0	1	4	3	+1	4	Advance to semi-finals
2	Tunisia	3	2	0	1	4	4	0	4	Advance to semi-finals
3	Syria	3	1	0	2	5	4	+1	2	
4	United Arab Emirates	3	1	0	2	3	5	−2	2	

Rules for classification: Group stage tiebreakers
23 September 1985

Iraq	2–0	Tunisia

Stade Akid Lotfi, Tlemcen
23 September 1985

United Arab Emirates	0–3	Syria

Stade Akid Lotfi, Tlemcen

25 September 1985

Syria	2–3	Tunisia

Stade Akid Lotfi, Tlemcen
25 September 1985

Iraq	1–3	United Arab Emirates

Stade Akid Lotfi, Tlemcen

27 September 1985

Tunisia	1–0	United Arab Emirates

Stade Akid Lotfi, Tlemcen
27 September 1985

Syria	0–1	Iraq

Stade Akid Lotfi, Tlemcen

== Knockout phase ==
=== Bracket ===
Semi-finals
29 September
Saudi Arabia (a.e.t.)	1
Tunisia	0
29 September
Algeria	2
Iraq	0

Final
1 October
Saudi Arabia	2
Algeria	1
Third place
1 October
Tunisia	0
Iraq	2

=== Semi-finals ===
29 September 1985

Saudi Arabia	1–0 (a.e.t.)	Tunisia
Fahd Al-Hamdan

Stade du 5 Juillet, Algiers

29 September 1985

Algeria	2–0	Iraq

Stade du 5 Juillet, Algiers

=== Third place play-off ===
1 October 1985

Tunisia	0–2	Iraq
		Mohamed Khalaf 36' (pen.), 76'

Stade du 5 Juillet, Algiers

=== Final ===
1 October 1985
18:00

Saudi Arabia	2–1	Algeria
Saleh Al-Mutlaq 49'; Bassem Abu Dawood 52'		Nassim Zeggour 25'

Stade du 5 Juillet, Algiers
Attendance: 40 000
Referee: Karim Nacer (Tunisia)
