= Saudi Arabia national under-20 football team =

Football team representing Saudi Arabia

Saudi Arabia Under-20
- Nickname(s): الصقور الخضر (The Green Falcons)
- Association: SAFF
- Confederation: AFC (Asia)
- Sub-confederation: WAFF (West Asia)
- Head coach: Marcos Soares
- Home stadium: Various
- FIFA code: KSA
First colours	Second colours

AFC U-20 Asian Cup
- Appearances: 15 (first in 1973)
- Best result: Winners (1986, 1992, 2018)

FIFA U-20 World Cup
- Appearances: 10 (first in 1985)
- Best result: Round of 16 (2011, 2017)

Saudi Arabia national under-20 football team (Arabic: المنتخب السعودي لكرة القدم تحت 20 سنة) also known as Saudi Arabia Youth team, represents Saudi Arabia in international football competitions in AFC U-20 Asian Cup and FIFA U-20 World Cup, as well as any other under-20 international football tournaments.

== Honours ==
AFC U-20 Asian Cup

- Winners (3): 1986, 1992, 2018
- Runners-up (3): 1985, 2016, 2025

Arab Cup U-20

- Winners (3): 1985, 2021, 2022
- Runners-up (3): 1983, 2011, 2012

AGCFF U-20 Gulf Cup

- Winners (2): 2016, 2025

== Competitions record ==
=== FIFA U-20 World Cup ===
FIFA U-20 World Cup record
Host/Year	Round	Position	Pld	W	D*	L	GF	GA
(Tunisia) 1977	Did not qualify							
(Japan) 1979	Did not qualify							
(Australia) 1981	Did not qualify							
(Mexico) 1983	Did not qualify							
(Soviet Union) 1985	Group stage	10th	3	1	1	1	1	1
(Chile) 1987	Group stage	16th	3	0	0	3	0	6
(Saudi Arabia) 1989	Group stage	10th	3	1	0	2	4	3
(Portugal) 1991	Did not qualify							
(Australia) 1993	Group stage	13th	3	0	2	1	1	2
(Qatar) 1995	Did not qualify							
(Malaysia) 1997	Did not qualify							
(Nigeria) 1999	Group stage	21st	3	0	1	2	2	6
(Argentina) 2001	Did not qualify							
(United Arab Emirates) 2003	Group stage	19th	3	0	2	1	2	3
(Netherlands) 2005	Did not qualify							
(Canada) 2007	Did not qualify							
(Egypt) 2009	Did not qualify							
(Colombia) 2011	Round of 16	10th	4	2	0	2	8	5
(Turkey) 2013	Did not qualify							
(New Zealand) 2015	Did not qualify							
(South Korea) 2017	Round of 16	15th	4	1	1	2	3	5
(Poland) 2019	Group stage	20th	3	0	0	3	4	8
(Indonesia) ~~2021~~	Cancelled due to the COVID-19 pandemic							
(Argentina) 2023	Did not qualify							
(Chile) 2025	Group stage	18th	3	0	1	2	3	5
(Azerbaijan) (Uzbekistan) 2027	To be determined							
(Armenia) (Georgia (country)) 2029	To be determined							
Total	10/26	Best: R16	32	5	6	19	28	44

*Draws include knockout matches decided on penalty kicks.

=== AFC U-20 Asian Cup ===
Host/Year	Round	Position	Pld	W	D	L	GF	GA
(Federation of Malaya) 1959	Did not enter							
(Federation of Malaya) 1960	Did not enter							
(Thailand) 1961	Did not enter							
(Thailand) 1962	Did not enter							
(Federation of Malaya) 1963	Did not enter							
(South Vietnam) 1964	Did not enter							
(Japan) 1965	Did not enter							
(Philippines) 1966	Did not enter							
(Thailand) 1967	Did not enter							
(South Korea) 1968	Did not enter							
(Thailand) 1969	Did not enter							
(Philippines) 1970	Did not enter							
(Japan) 1971	Did not enter							
(Thailand) 1972	Did not enter							
(Iran) 1973	Semi-finals	4th	6	2	1	3	5	11
(Thailand) 1974	Did not enter							
(Kuwait) 1975	Did not enter							
(Thailand) 1976	Did not enter							
(Iran) 1977	Quarter-finals	5th	4	2	2	0	7	2
(Bangladesh) 1978	Quarter-finals	5th	5	2	2	1	12	5
(Thailand) 1980	Did not enter							
(Thailand) 1982	Did not enter							
(United Arab Emirates) 1985	Round-robin	2nd	3	1	2	0	8	5
(Saudi Arabia) 1986	Champions	1st	5	5	0	0	17	1
(Qatar) 1988	Did not enter							
(Indonesia) 1990	Did not enter							
(United Arab Emirates) 1992	Champions	1st	6	5	0	1	13	3
(Indonesia) 1994	Did not enter							
(South Korea) 1996	Did not enter							
(Thailand) 1998	Semi-finals	3rd	6	4	1	1	10	6
(Iran) 2000	Did not qualify							
(Qatar) 2002	Semi-finals	3rd	6	4	0	2	18	5
(Malaysia) 2004	Did not qualify							
(India) 2006	Quarter-finals	7th	4	2	1	1	7	4
(Saudi Arabia) 2008	Quarter-finals	7th	4	2	1	1	7	4
(China) 2010	Semi-finals	4th	5	3	0	2	5	6
(United Arab Emirates) 2012	Group stage	10th	3	1	1	1	6	8
(Myanmar) 2014	Did not qualify							
(Bahrain) 2016	Runners-up	2nd	6	3	2	1	16	11
(Indonesia) 2018	Champions	1st	6	6	0	0	13	4
(Uzbekistan) 2023	Group stage	12th	3	1	0	2	2	4
(China) 2025	Runners-up	2nd	6	3	2	1	5	3
Total	16/42	Best: 3 titles	78	46	15	17	151	82

=== Arab Cup U-20 ===
Arab Cup U-20 record
Host/Year	Round	Position	Pld	W	D*	L	GF	GA
(Morocco) 2011	Runners-up	2nd	5	4	1	0	9	4
(Jordan) 2012	Runners-up	2nd	5	3	1	1	13	7
(Qatar) 2014	Canceled							
(Saudi Arabia) 2020	Group stage	9th	3	1	1	1	7	4
(Egypt) 2021	Champions	1st	6	4	1	1	11	7
(Saudi Arabia) 2022	Champions	1st	5	3	2	0	12	2
(Iraq) 2026	To be determined							
(Egypt) 2028	To be determined							
Total	Best: 2 titles	5 / 5	24	15	6	3	52	24

*Draws include knockout matches decided on penalty kicks.

=== Palestine Cup of Nations for Youth ===
Palestine Cup of Nations for Youth record
Host/Year	Round	Position	Pld	W	D*	L	GF	GA
(Morocco) 1983	Runners-up	2nd	7	4	0	3	9	6
(Algeria) 1985	Champions	1st	7	6	1	0	11	1
(Iraq) 1989	Third place	3rd	5	3	1	1	7	4
Total	3/3	Best: 1 title	19	13	2	4	27	11

*Draws include knockout matches decided on penalty kicks.

== Results and fixtures ==
The following is a list of match results in the last 24 months, as well as any future matches that have been scheduled.

Win Draw Loss Fixture

=== 2026 ===
31 August 2026 2027 AFC U-20 Asian Cup qualification	Saudi Arabia	2–0	Hong Kong	Hamad bin Khalifa Stadium, Doha
19:00	Suhayb 26'; Al Obeidi 45+1' (pen.)	Report		Referee: Ammar Abo Alo (Syria)

3 September 2026 2027 AFC U-20 Asian Cup qualification	Oman	2–3	Saudi Arabia	Hamad bin Khalifa Stadium, Doha
19:00	Al Samin 69'; Al Qassmi 45+1' (pen.)	Report	Abdullah 18' (o.g.); Abu Bakr 47'; Yousef 66'	Referee: Ben Abraham (Australia)

6 September 2026 2027 AFC U-20 Asian Cup qualification	Saudi Arabia	1–0	Qatar	Hamad bin Khalifa Stadium, Doha
19:00	Ibrahim 81'	Report		Referee: Koki Nagamine (Japan)

== Players ==
=== Current squad ===
The following 21 players were called up for the 2025 FIFA U-20 World Cup

No.	Pos.	Player	Date of birth (age)	Club
1	GK	Hamed Al-Shanqiti	26 April 2005 (aged 19)	(Saudi Arabian Football Federation) Al-Ittihad
2	DF	Saud Al-Tumbukti	28 January 2005 (aged 20)	(Saudi Arabian Football Federation) Al-Riyadh
3	DF	Abdullah Al-Sahli	17 May 2005 (aged 19)	(Saudi Arabian Football Federation) Al-Batin
4	DF	Saud Harun	19 July 2005 (aged 19)	(Saudi Arabian Football Federation) Al-Hilal
5	DF	Mohammed Barnawi	7 August 2005 (aged 19)	(Saudi Arabian Football Federation) Al-Ittihad
6	DF	Saleh Barnawi	8 February 2007 (aged 18)	(Saudi Arabian Football Federation) Al-Hilal
7	MF	Amar Al-Yuhaybi	3 March 2006 (aged 18)	(Saudi Arabian Football Federation) Al-Ahli
8	MF	Rakan Al-Ghamdi	6 September 2005 (aged 19)	(Saudi Arabian Football Federation) Al-Nassr
9	FW	Talal Haji	16 September 2007 (aged 17)	(Saudi Arabian Football Federation) Al-Riyadh
10	MF	Ziyad Al-Ghamdi	16 February 2005 (aged 19)	(Saudi Arabian Football Federation) Al-Ettifaq
11	FW	Saad Haqawi	8 October 2005 (aged 19)	(Saudi Arabian Football Federation) Al-Nassr
12	DF	Nawaf Al-Ghulaimish	2 May 2005 (aged 19)	(Saudi Arabian Football Federation) Al-Shabab
13	MF	Bassam Hazazi	29 March 2005 (aged 19)	(Saudi Arabian Football Federation) Al-Nassr
14	MF	Farhah Al-Shamrani	27 February 2006 (aged 18)	(Saudi Arabian Football Federation) Al-Riyadh
15	MF	Eyad Housa	21 November 2006 (aged 18)	(Saudi Arabian Football Federation) Al-Qadsiah
16	GK	Mahmoud Al-Burayh	14 February 2006 (aged 18)	(Saudi Arabian Football Federation) Al-Fateh
17	MF	Abdulmalik Al-Marwani	19 June 2005 (aged 19)	(Saudi Arabian Football Federation) Al-Taawoun
18	MF	Ramez Al-Attar	17 January 2006 (aged 19)	(Saudi Arabian Football Federation) Al-Ahli
19	DF	Awad Aman	16 January 2005 (aged 20)	(Saudi Arabian Football Federation) Al-Nassr
20	FW	Thamer Al-Khaibari	3 December 2005 (aged 19)	(Saudi Arabian Football Federation) Neom
21	GK	Abdulrahman Al-Ghamdi	13 February 2006 (aged 18)	(Saudi Arabian Football Federation) Al-Taawoun

=== Recent call-ups ===
The following players have previously been called up to the Saudi Arabia under-23 squad in the last 12 months and remain eligible.

Pos.	Player	Date of birth (age)	Caps	Goals	Club	Latest call-up

== Head-to-head record ==
The following table shows Saudi Arabia's head-to-head record in the FIFA U-20 World Cup and AFC U-20 Asian Cup.

=== In FIFA U-20 World Cup ===
Opponent	Pld	W	D	L	GF	GA	GD	Win %
Australia	1	0	0	1	1	3	−2	0.00
Brazil	3	0	1	2	0	4	−4	0.00
Bulgaria	1	0	0	1	0	2	−2	0.00
Colombia	1	0	0	1	0	1	−1	0.00
Croatia	1	1	0	0	2	0	+2	100.00
Czech Republic	1	0	0	1	0	1	−1	0.00
Ecuador	1	1	0	0	2	1	+1	100.00
France	1	0	0	1	0	2	−2	0.00
Germany	1	0	0	1	0	3	−3	0.00
Guatemala	1	1	0	0	6	0	+6	100.00
Ivory Coast	1	0	1	0	0	0	+0	0.00
Mali	1	0	0	1	3	4	−1	0.00
Mexico	3	0	2	1	3	4	−1	0.00
Nigeria	3	0	0	3	3	7	−4	0.00
Norway	1	0	1	0	0	0	+0	0.00
Panama	1	0	0	1	1	2	−1	0.00
Portugal	1	1	0	0	3	0	+3	100.00
Republic of Ireland	3	1	0	2	2	4	−2	33.33
Senegal	1	0	0	1	0	2	−2	0.00
Spain	1	0	1	0	0	0	+0	0.00
United States	2	0	1	1	1	2	−1	0.00
Uruguay	1	0	0	1	0	1	−1	0.00
Total	31	5	7	19	27	43	−16	16.13

=== In AFC U-20 Asian Cup ===
Opponent	Pld	W	D	L	GF	GA	GD	Win %
Australia	4	1	2	1	5	5	+0	25.00
Bahrain	3	1	1	1	6	5	+1	33.33
Bangladesh	1	1	0	0	4	0	+4	100.00
China	6	3	1	2	9	8	+1	50.00
India	4	4	0	0	14	1	+13	100.00
Indonesia	2	2	0	0	9	1	+8	100.00
Iran	2	2	0	0	8	6	+2	100.00
Iraq	4	0	2	2	5	7	−2	0.00
Japan	9	1	3	5	9	15	−6	11.11
Jordan	2	2	0	0	3	0	+3	100.00
Kazakhstan	2	2	0	0	5	2	+3	100.00
Kuwait	1	1	0	0	1	0	+1	100.00
Kyrgyzstan	1	1	0	0	1	0	+1	100.00
Lebanon	1	0	1	0	1	1	+0	0.00
Malaysia	3	3	0	0	7	1	+6	100.00
Myanmar	1	0	0	1	0	2	−2	0.00
New Zealand	1	1	0	0	3	1	+2	100.00
North Korea	3	2	1	0	5	2	+3	66.67
Pakistan	1	1	0	0	2	1	+1	100.00
Qatar	3	2	0	1	6	5	+1	66.67
South Korea	8	4	2	2	11	7	+4	50.00
Sri Lanka	1	1	0	0	5	0	+5	100.00
Syria	2	1	0	1	2	5	−3	50.00
Tajikistan	1	1	0	0	3	1	+2	100.00
Thailand	5	4	1	0	11	1	+10	80.00
United Arab Emirates	3	1	1	1	4	3	+1	33.33
Uzbekistan	2	2	0	0	6	1	+5	100.00
Vietnam	1	1	0	0	2	0	+2	100.00
Yemen	1	1	0	0	4	1	+3	100.00
Total	78	46	15	17	151	82	+69	58.97

== Previous squads ==
=== FIFA U-20 World Cup squads ===
- 1985 FIFA World Youth Championship
- 1987 FIFA World Youth Championship
- 1989 FIFA World Youth Championship
- 1993 FIFA World Youth Championship
- 1999 FIFA World Youth Championship
- 2003 FIFA World Youth Championship
- 2011 FIFA U-20 World Cup
- 2017 FIFA U-20 World Cup
- 2019 FIFA U-20 World Cup

== See also ==
- Saudi Arabia national football team
- Saudi Arabia national under-23 football team
- Saudi Arabia national under-17 football team
