= Mohamed Chibi =

Moroccan footballer (born 1993)

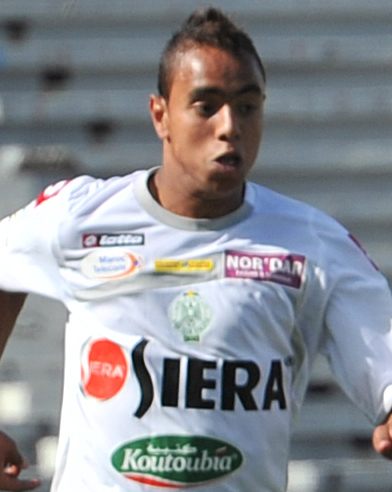
- Chibi with Raja CA in 2012

Personal information
- Full name: Mohamed Chibi
- Date of birth: 21 January 1993 (age 33)
- Place of birth: Casablanca, Morocco
- Height: 1.79 m (5 ft 10 in)
- Position: Right-back

Team information
- Current team: Pyramids FC
- Number: 15

Youth career
- 2001–2011: Raja

Senior career*
Years	Team	Apps	(Gls)
2011–2014	Raja	21	(0)
2013	→Kawkab Marrakech (loan)	10	(0)
2014	→CRA (loan)	1	(1)
2014–2015	Ittihad Khemisset	0	(0)
2015–2017	KAC Kénitra	55	(2)
2017–2018	Moghreb Tétouan	11	(0)
2018	Khénifra	14	(1)
2018–2019	AS FAR	26	(2)
2019–2021	Ittihad Tanger	44	(4)
2021–2022	AS FAR	10	(0)
2022–	Pyramids FC	78	(6)

International career^{‡}
2012	Morocco U20	11	(2)
2013	Morocco U23	5	(2)
2021–	Morocco	3	(0)
Medal record
Men's football
Representing Morocco
Africa Cup of Nations
Winner	2025 Morocco
Arab Cup U-20
Winner	2011 Morocco
- * Club domestic league appearances and goals as of 28 September 2025 (UTC) ‡ National team caps and goals as of 13 November 2021 (UTC)

Mohamed Chibi (Arabic: محمد الشيبي; born 21 January 1993) is a Moroccan professional footballer who plays as a right-back for Egyptian Premier League club Pyramids FC and the Morocco national team.

== Club career ==
A youth product of Raja, Chibi began his senior career with them in 2011 signing a 5-year professional contract. He shortly after went on successive loans to Kawkab Marrakech and CRA, before transferring to Ittihad Khemisset in 2014. In 2015, he moved to KAC Kénitra where he became the starter. He had stints at Moghreb Tétouan and Khénifra, before moving to AS FAR in 2018. He moved to Ittihad Tanger for 2 years in 2019, before returning to AS FAR. After a relatively successful campaign with AS FAR, finishing third, Chibi signed with Egyptian Premier League club Pyramids FC.

Chibi was named Egypt's best right-back for 2024 after an impressive season with Pyramids FC, in which he made 34 appearances and led the league with nine assists.

Chibi won the Egypt Cup in Egypt Cup: 2023–24 and was the Egyptian Premier League Top assists provider: 2023–24.

In season 2024–2025, Chibi was the Egyptian Premier League Top assists provider: 2024–25, also managed to win the CAF Champions League: 2024–25, CAF Super Cup: 2025 and FIFA African–Asian–Pacific Cup: 2025. Chibi got named Pyramids FC Player of the Season: 2024–25.

El-Shibi was named Best Right-Back in the Egyptian Premier League for the 2025–26 season at the Egyptian Professional Players Association awards.

== International career ==
Chibi won the Arab Cup U-20: 2011 with Morocco.

Chibi debuted with the Morocco national team in a 3–0 2022 FIFA World Cup qualification win over Sudan on 12 November 2021.

Chibi Won the Arab Cup in 2021 and was selected in the FIFA Arab Cup Team of the Tournament: 2021

On 28 December 2023, Chibi was amongst the 27 players selected by coach Walid Regragui to represent Morocco in the 2023 Africa Cup of Nations.

On 20 October 2025, Chibi was nominated for the 2025 CAF Interclub Player of the Year award at the CAF Awards.

On 11 December 2025, Chibi was called up to the Morocco squad for the 2025 Africa Cup of Nations. Chibi played one game in the tournament winning a 3–0 victory vs Zambia in the group stages, Chibi played full game. Morocco won the Africa Cup of Nations: 2025

== Controversy ==
In a game between Pyramids FC and Al Ahly SC in June 2023, Mohamed Chibi got into a fight with Hussein El Shahat. Following the 3–0 win for Pyramids, El Shahat "said some harsh words regarding Chibi's religion" and then "slapped the face of Chibi and threatened to break his leg." The staff for both sides had to stop the conflict. El Shahat reportedly offered to apologize to Chibi and shook his hand. El Shahat was then fined £20,000 and given a two-match suspension. Former footballer Moataz Eno stated he believed that El Shahat did the right thing.

On 9 November 2024, a reconciliation was reached between Chibi and El Shahat, while they were present at a ceremony to distribute the best awards in the Egyptian Premier League.

== Career statistics ==
=== International goals ===
No.	Date	Venue	Opponent	Score	Result	Competition
1.	4 December 2021	Ahmed bin Ali Stadium, Al Rayyan, Qatar	Jordan	3–0	4–0	2021 FIFA Arab Cup

== Honours ==
Raja CA

- Botola Pro: 2012–13

AS FAR

- Moroccan Throne Cup: 2019–20

Pyramids FC

- Egypt Cup: 2023–24
- CAF Champions League: 2024–25
- CAF Super Cup: 2025
- FIFA African–Asian–Pacific Cup: 2025

Morocco U20

- Arab Cup U-20: 2011

Morocco

- Africa Cup of Nations: 2025

Individual

- FIFA Arab Cup Team of the Tournament: 2021
- Botola Pro Team of the Season: 2020–21, 2021–22
- Egyptian Premier League Top assists provider: 2023–24, 2024–25
- Pyramids FC Player of the Season: 2024–25
- Egyptian Premier League Best foreign player: 2025–26
