= 1989 Palestine Cup of Nations for Youth =

كأس فلسطين للشباب

Tournament details
- Host country: Iraq
- Dates: 31 August – 14 September
- Teams: 14 (from 2 confederations)
- Venues: 4 (in 3 host cities)

Final positions
- Champions: Morocco (1st title)
- Runners-up: Iraq
- Third place: Saudi Arabia
- Fourth place: Bahrain

Tournament statistics
- Matches played: 26
- Goals scored: 64 (2.46 per match)
- Top scorer(s): (Iraq) Alaa Kadhim (7 goals)
- Best player: (Morocco) Hicham Dmii
- Best goalkeeper: (Saudi Arabia) Mohamed Al-Deayea
- Fair play award: Saudi Arabia

The 1989 Palestine Cup of Nations for Youth was the third edition of the Arab Cup U-20. The tournament was held in three cities in Iraq, from 31 August to 14 September 1989.

== Participating teams ==
- Algeria
- Bahrain
- Iraq (hosts)
- Jordan
- Kuwait
- Morocco
- Oman
- Palestine
- Qatar
- Saudi Arabia (holders)
- Tunisia
- United Arab Emirates
- North Yemen
- South Yemen

== Venues ==
Cities	Venues	Capacity
Baghdad	Al-Shaab Stadium	45,000
Baghdad	Al-Kashafa Stadium	15,000
Kirkuk	Kirkuk Olympic Stadium	25,000
Mosul	Al Mosul University Stadium	5,000

== Group stage ==
=== Group A ===
Pos	Team	Pld	W	D	L	GF	GA	GD	Pts	Qualification
1	United Arab Emirates	3	1	2	0	5	3	+2	4	Advance to Quarter-finals
2	Qatar	3	1	2	0	2	1	+1	4	Advance to Quarter-finals
3	Palestine	3	0	2	1	1	2	−1	2	
4	Oman	3	1	0	2	2	4	−2	2	

Rules for classification: Group stage tiebreakers

(at Al-Kashafa Stadium, Baghdad)

2- 9-1989 Palestine    0-1 Oman         
2- 9-1989 UAE          1-1 Qatar        
4- 9-1989 UAE          1-1 Palestine    
4- 9-1989 Oman         0-1 Qatar        
6- 9-1989 Qatar        0-0 Palestine    
6- 9-1989 Oman         1-3 UAE

=== Group B ===
Pos	Team	Pld	W	D	L	GF	GA	GD	Pts	Qualification
1	Morocco	3	3	0	0	9	3	+6	6	Advance to Quarter-finals
2	Iraq (H)	3	2	0	1	8	2	+6	4	Advance to Quarter-finals
3	North Yemen	3	1	0	2	3	7	−4	2	
4	Jordan	3	0	0	3	0	8	−8	0	

Rules for classification: Group stage tiebreakers
(H) Hosts

(at Al-Shaab Stadium, Baghdad) 
31- 8-1989 Iraq         4-0 North Yemen  
            [Ali Oda, Alaa Kadim (3)]
1- 9-1989 Morocco      4-0 Jordan       
3- 9-1989 Iraq         2-0 Jordan       
            [Ali Oda, Alaa Kadim]   
3- 9-1989 Morocco      3-1 North Yemen  
5- 9-1989 Iraq         2-2 Morocco      
            [Faiz Thani (pen); N.N., N.N.]      
5- 9-1989 Jordan       0-2 North Yemen

=== Group C ===
Pos	Team	Pld	W	D	L	GF	GA	GD	Pts	Qualification
1	Saudi Arabia	2	2	0	0	4	1	+3	4	Advance to Quarter-finals
2	Bahrain	2	0	1	1	1	2	−1	1	Advance to Quarter-finals
3	Kuwait	2	0	1	1	0	2	−2	1	

Rules for classification: Group stage tiebreakers

(at Kirkuk Olympic Stadium, Kirkuk)

2- 9-1989 Saudi Arabia 2-0 Kuwait       
4- 9-1989 Kuwait       0-0 Bahrain      
6- 9-1989 Saudi Arabia 2-1 Bahrain

=== Group D ===
Pos	Team	Pld	W	D	L	GF	GA	GD	Pts	Qualification
1	South Yemen	2	1	1	0	4	2	+2	3	Advance to Quarter-finals
2	Tunisia	2	1	0	1	3	4	−1	2	Advance to Quarter-finals
3	Algeria	2	0	1	1	2	3	−1	1	

Rules for classification: Group stage tiebreakers

(at Nineveh University Stadium, Mosul)
2- 9-1989 Tunisia      1-3 South Yemen  
4- 9-1989 Tunisia      2-1 Algeria      
6- 9-1989 South Yemen  1-1 Algeria

== Knockout stage ==
=== Bracket ===
Quarter-finals
9 September – Baghdad
United Arab Emirates	2
Bahrain	3
9 September – Baghdad
Morocco	1
Tunisia	0
10 September – Baghdad
Saudi Arabia (a.e.t.)	2
Qatar	1
10 September – Baghdad
Iraq	2
South Yemen	0

Semi-finals
12 September – Baghdad
Bahrain	1 (0)
Morocco (p)	1 (3)
12 September – Baghdad
Saudi Arabia	0
Iraq (a.e.t.)	1

Final
14 September – Baghdad
Morocco	3
Iraq	1
Third place match
13 September – Baghdad
Bahrain	1 (3)
Saudi Arabia (p)	1 (4)

=== Final ===
14 September 1989

Morocco	3–1	Iraq
Mohamed Sabek 12', 42'; Khalid Raghib 69'		Ali Awda 79'

Al-Shaab Stadium, Baghdad
Referee: Messaoud Koussa (Algeria)
