= Muwafaq Hussein =

Iraqi association football player

Personal information
- Full name: Muwafaq Hussein Zaidan Adlool
- Place of birth: Iraq
- Position: Midfielder

International career
Years	Team	Apps	(Gls)
1986	Iraq	5	(1)

Managerial career
- 2009–2013: Iraq U17
- 2013: Iraq U20

Muwafaq Hussein Zaidan Adlool (Arabic: مُوَفَّق حُسَيْن زَيْدَان عَدْلُول) is a former Iraqi football midfielder who played for Iraq.

Muwafaq played for the national team in 1986 . He coached Iraq at the 2013 FIFA U-17 World Cup.
