= 2011 Arab Cup U-20 =

كأس العرب تحت 20 سنة

Tournament details
- Host country: Morocco
- Dates: 8–24 July
- Teams: 10
- Venues: 2 (in 2 host cities)

Final positions
- Champions: Morocco (1st title)
- Runners-up: Saudi Arabia

Tournament statistics
- Matches played: 21
- Goals scored: 52 (2.48 per match)

The 2011 Arab Cup U-20 was the fourth edition of the Arab Cup U-20 and the first one under its new name. It was hosted by Morocco. Ten teams from the region took part, divided into two groups of five teams. The group winners both advance to the final.

Morocco won the competition by defeating Saudi Arabia in the final.

== Teams ==
10 teams for U-20 participated in the tournament.

- Algeria
- Bahrain
- Egypt
- Iraq
- Kuwait
- Morocco (Hosts)
- Palestine
- Saudi Arabia
- Sudan
- Syria

== Venues ==
- Rabat
- Kénitra

== Group stage ==
=== Group A ===
| Team | Pld | W | D | L | GF | GA | GD | Pts |
|---|---|---|---|---|---|---|---|---|
| Morocco | 4 | 3 | 1 | 0 | 3 | 0 | +3 | 10 |
| Syria | 4 | 3 | 0 | 1 | 8 | 4 | +4 | 9 |
| Algeria | 4 | 2 | 1 | 1 | 7 | 3 | +4 | 7 |
| Sudan | 4 | 1 | 0 | 3 | 3 | 7 | –4 | 3 |
| Palestine | 4 | 0 | 0 | 4 | 1 | 8 | –7 | 0 |

8 July 2011

| Palestine | 0 – 2 | Algeria |

Stade Municipal, Kenitra
Referee: Ali Sabbagh (Lebanon)
8 July 2011

| Morocco | 1 – 0 | Sudan |

Stade Municipal, Kenitra
Referee: Mahmoud Ashour (Egypt)

11 July 2011

| Algeria | 1 – 3 | Syria |

Stade Municipal, Kenitra
11 July 2011

| Morocco | 1 – 0 | Palestine |

Stade Municipal, Kenitra

14 July 2011

| Palestine | 1 – 3 | Syria |

Stade Municipal, Kenitra
Referee: Mahmoud Ashour (Egypt)
14 July 2011

| Sudan | 0 – 4 | Algeria |

Stade Municipal, Kenitra
Referee: Ali Sabbagh (Lebanon)

17 July 2011

| Palestine | 0 – 2 | Sudan |

Stade Municipal, Kenitra
17 July 2011

| Morocco | 1 – 0 | Syria |

Stade Municipal, Kenitra

20 July 2011

| Syria | 2 – 1 | Sudan |

Stade Municipal, Kenitra
20 July 2011

| Morocco | 0 – 0 | Algeria |

Stade Municipal, Kenitra
Referee: Mahmoud Ashour (Egypt)

=== Group B ===
| Team | Pld | W | D | L | GF | GA | GD | Pts |
|---|---|---|---|---|---|---|---|---|
| Saudi Arabia | 4 | 4 | 0 | 0 | 6 | 1 | +5 | 12 |
| Egypt | 4 | 3 | 0 | 1 | 6 | 2 | +4 | 9 |
| Iraq | 4 | 2 | 0 | 2 | 6 | 4 | +2 | 6 |
| Bahrain | 4 | 1 | 0 | 3 | 5 | 8 | –3 | 3 |
| Kuwait | 4 | 0 | 0 | 4 | 1 | 9 | –8 | 0 |

9 July 2011

| Iraq | 2 – 0 | Bahrain |

Stade Municipal, Kenitra
9 July 2011

| Kuwait | 0 – 1 | Saudi Arabia |

Stade Municipal, Kenitra

12 July 2011

| Bahrain | 0 – 3 | Egypt |

Stade Municipal, Kenitra
12 July 2011

| Kuwait | 0 – 3 | Iraq |

Stade Municipal, Kenitra

15 July 2011

| Iraq | 1 – 2 | Egypt |

Stade Municipal, Kenitra
15 July 2011

| Saudi Arabia | 2 – 1 | Bahrain |

Stade Municipal, Kenitra

18 July 2011

| Iraq | 0 – 2 | Saudi Arabia |

Stade Municipal, Kenitra
18 July 2011

| Egypt | 1 – 0 | Kuwait |

Stade Municipal, Kenitra

21 July 2011

| Bahrain | 4 – 1 | Kuwait |

Stade Municipal, Kenitra
21 July 2011

| Egypt | 0 – 1 | Saudi Arabia |

Stade Municipal, Kenitra

== Final ==
24 July 2011
16:30

| Morocco | 3 – 3 | Saudi Arabia |
|---|---|---|
| Essaiydy 33'; Chibi 71', 78' | Report | Asiri 30'; Al-Najrani 39' (pen.) 73' |
Penalties
| | 3 – 1 |

Stade Municipal, Kenitra

== Winners ==
2011 Arab Youth Championship

Morocco
First title
