= United Arab Emirates national under-20 football team =

UAE Under-20
- Nickname: Al Abyad
- Association: United Arab Emirates Football Association
- Confederation: AFC (Asia)
- Head coach: Saleem Ayoun
- Most caps: Abdulaziz Hussain
- FIFA code: UAE
First colours	Second colours

First international
- United Arab Emirates 1–0 South Yemen (Kathmandu, Nepal; 7 October 1982)

Biggest win
- Djibouti 0–8 United Arab Emirates (Cairo, Egypt; 20 June 2021)

Biggest defeat
- Morocco 5–0 United Arab Emirates (Cairo, Egypt; 26 June 2021)

AFC U-20 Asian Cup
- Appearances: 14 (first in 1982)
- Best result: Champions (2008)

Arab Cup U-20
- Appearances: 3 (first in 2020)
- Best result: Group stage (2020, 2021, 2022)

FIFA U-20 World Cup
- Appearances: 3 (first in 1997)
- Best result: Quarter-final (2003, 2009)

United Arab Emirates national under-20 football team
Medal record

AFC U-20 Asian Cup
Bronze medal – third place	1985 UAE	Team
Bronze medal – third place	1996 South Korea	Team
Gold medal – first place	2008 Saudi Arabia	Team

The United Arab Emirates national under-20 football team is the national Association football youth team of United Arab Emirates and is controlled by the United Arab Emirates Football Association.

== Competitive record ==
=== FIFA U-20 World Cup ===
Host nation(s) / Year	Round
(Malaysia) 1997	Round of 16
(United Arab Emirates) 2003	Quarter-finals
(Egypt) 2009	Quarter-finals

=== AFC U-20 Asian Cup ===
Year	Result	Pld	W	D	L	GF	GA
(Thailand) 1982	Fourth Place	3	0	1	2	2	7
(United Arab Emirates) 1985	Third Place	3	1	1	1	9	4
(Saudi Arabia) 1986	did not qualify						
(Qatar) 1988	Fourth Place	5	1	2	2	2	5
(Indonesia) 1990	did not qualify						
(United Arab Emirates) 1992	Fourth Place	5	2	1	2	5	5
(Indonesia) 1994	did not qualify						
(South Korea) 1996	Third Place	6	2	2	2	12	13
(Thailand) 1998	did not qualify						
(Iran) 2000	Group Stage	4	0	0	4	6	12
(Qatar) 2002	Group Stage	4	1	1	2	3	6
(Malaysia) 2004	did not qualify						
(India) 2006	Group Stage	3	0	0	3	2	6
(Saudi Arabia) 2008	Champions	6	6	0	0	12	3
(China) 2010	Quarter–Finals	4	1	1	2	7	6
(United Arab Emirates) 2012	Group Stage	3	0	3	0	2	2
(Myanmar) 2014	Quarter–Finals	4	1	2	1	7	5
(Bahrain) 2016	Group Stage	3	1	1	1	4	3
(Indonesia) 2018	Group Stage	3	2	0	1	10	3
(Uzbekistan) ~~2020~~	Cancelled						
(Uzbekistan) 2023	did not qualify						
(China) 2025	did not qualify						
(China) 2027	did not qualify						
Total	14/20	56	18	15	23	83	80

=== Arab Cup U-20 ===
Year	Result	Pld	W	D	L	GF	GA
(Morocco) 2011	did not enter						
(Jordan) 2012	did not enter						
(Qatar) ~~2014~~	Cancelled						
(Saudi Arabia) 2020	Group stage	3	1	1	1	3	2
(Egypt) 2021	Group stage	3	1	0	2	10	8
(Saudi Arabia) 2022	Group stage	2	0	1	1	2	4
(Iraq) 2026	To be determined						
(Egypt) 2028	To be determined						
Total	3/5	8	2	2	4	15	14

== Individual awards ==
All Emiratis players who have won many individual awards With the UAE Under-20.

FIFA U-20 World Cup

Year	Player	Award
(United Arab Emirates) 2003	Ismail Matar	Golden Ball

AFC U-19 Championship

Year	Player	Award
(Saudi Arabia) 2008	Ahmed Khalil	Most Valuable Player Top Scorer

Asian Young Footballer of the Year

Year	Player	Award
2008	Ahmed Khalil	Asian Young Footballer of the Year

== Matches ==
=== Recent results and fixtures ===
Win Draw Lose

=== 2026 ===
21 May 2026 Closed-doors friendly	Singapore	0–4	United Arab Emirates	Jalan Besar, Singapore
19:30 UTC+8				Stadium: Jalan Besar Stadium

24 May 2026 Closed-doors friendly	Singapore	0–4	United Arab Emirates	Jalan Besar, Singapore
19:30 UTC+8				Stadium: Jalan Besar Stadium

31 August 2026 2027 AFC U-20 Asian Cup qualification	Thailand	1–0	United Arab Emirates	Chonburi
	Siwakorn 45+1'	Report		Stadium: Chonburi Stadium; Referee: Feras Taweel (Syria)

3 September 2026 2027 AFC U-20 Asian Cup qualification	United Arab Emirates	1–2	Iraq	Chonburi
	Muller 15'	Report	Al Shawi 45'; Al Zeyadi 68'	Stadium: Chonburi Stadium; Referee: Akhrol Riskullaev (Uzbekistan)

6 September 2026 2027 AFC U-20 Asian Cup qualification	United Arab Emirates	3–2	Turkmenistan	Chonburi
	Muller 62', 81'; Al Jneibi 84'	Report	Gowşudow 8'; Charryev 19'	Stadium: Chonburi Stadium

== Current staff ==
Position	Name
Head coach	(United Arab Emirates) Saleem Ayoun
Assistant coach	(Zimbabwe) Noel Kaseke
Assistant coach	(Netherlands) John Metgod
Goalkeeping coach	(United Arab Emirates) Ali Ashoor
Fitness coach	(Romania) Bogdan Paravan
Scouting / Logistics officer	(United Arab Emirates) Fathi Mannaa
Doctor	(Serbia) Zoran Stankovic
Masseur	(Brazil) Edimar da Silva
Team manager	(United Arab Emirates) Ahmed Almarzooqi
Performance analyst	(Brazil) Eduardo Oliveira

=== Coaches ===
Manager	From	To
(United Arab Emirates) Khalifa Mubarak AlShamsi	2004	2006
(France) Jacky Bonnevay	2006	2007
(United Arab Emirates) Jumaa Rabea Mubarak	2007	2008
(Tunisia) Khaled Ben Yahia	July 2008	October 2008
(United Arab Emirates) Mahdi Redha	October 2008	2009
(France) Ludovic Batelli	2018	2020
(Greece) Nikolaos Kolompourdas	2020	2022
(United Arab Emirates) Faisal Al Taheri	2022	present

== Current squad ==
No.	Pos.	Player	Date of birth (age)	Caps	Goals	Club
	GK	Amer Al Farsi	2 February 2005 (age 21)			(United Arab Emirates Football Association) Al Ain
	GK	Hamad Al Menhali	15 April 2006 (age 20)			(United Arab Emirates Football Association) Al Jazira
	GK	Ali Al Saffar	18 March 2005 (age 21)			(United Arab Emirates Football Association) Shabab Al Ahli
	DF	Abdalla Ahmed	3 April 2005 (age 21)			(United Arab Emirates Football Association) Shabab Al Ahli
	DF	Saeed Amer	7 July 2006 (age 20)			(United Arab Emirates Football Association) Sharjah
	DF	Mansoor Al Blooshi	19 January 2005 (age 21)			(United Arab Emirates Football Association) Al Ain
	DF	Suhail Al Blooshi	28 September 2006 (age 20)			(United Arab Emirates Football Association) Al Ain
	DF	Yousif Al Marzooqi	7 March 2005 (age 21)			(United Arab Emirates Football Association) Al Jazira
	DF	Ahmed Al Obeidli	29 May 2005 (age 21)			(United Arab Emirates Football Association) Al Wasl
	DF	Mohammed Buzairi	21 February 2005 (age 21)			(United Arab Emirates Football Association) Al Wasl
	DF	Ahmed Katts	21 June 2007 (age 19)			(United Arab Emirates Football Association) Shabab Al Ahli
	MF	Hazim Abbas	18 March 2005 (age 21)			(United Arab Emirates Football Association) Al Ain
	MF	Mohamed Al Bannai	10 November 2006 (age 19)			(United Arab Emirates Football Association) Shabab Al Ahli
	MF	Nahyan Al Helali	22 August 2006 (age 20)			(United Arab Emirates Football Association) Al Jazira
	MF	Mohammed Al Jaari	16 August 2007 (age 19)			(United Arab Emirates Football Association) Al Wahda
	MF	Saif Al Kaabi	14 February 2005 (age 21)			(United Arab Emirates Football Association) Sharjah
	MF	Rashed Al Mazrouei	10 September 2005 (age 21)			(United Arab Emirates Football Association) Al Wasl
	MF	Mohamed Al Obeidli	22 March 2007 (age 19)			(United Arab Emirates Football Association) Al Wasl
	MF	Ghaith Bader	11 March 2005 (age 21)			(United Arab Emirates Football Association) Shabab Al Ahli
	MF	Hamdan Basweidan	26 December 2006 (age 19)			(United Arab Emirates Football Association) Shabab Al Ahli
	MF	Faisal Ismail	12 November 2006 (age 19)			(United Arab Emirates Football Association) Al Wasl
	FW	Eid Al Hammadi	31 August 2005 (age 21)			(United Arab Emirates Football Association) Al Ain
	FW	Mohammed Al-Mansouri	30 May 2006 (age 20)			(United Arab Emirates Football Association) Shabab Al Ahli
	FW	Mayed Khamis	21 January 2008 (age 18)			(United Arab Emirates Football Association) Al Nasr
	FW	Essa Obaid	28 August 2005 (age 21)			(United Arab Emirates Football Association) Al Nasr
	FW	Obaid Salem	5 April 2005 (age 21)			(United Arab Emirates Football Association) Al Nasr

== Head-to-head record ==
The following table shows United Arab Emirates' head-to-head record in FIFA U-20 World Cup and AFC U-20 Asian Cup.

=== In FIFA U-20 World Cup ===
Opponent	Pld	W	D	L	GF	GA	GD	Win %
Australia	1	1	0	0	1	0	+1	100.00
Burkina Faso	1	0	1	0	0	0	+0	0.00
Colombia	1	0	0	1	0	1	−1	0.00
Costa Rica	1	0	0	1	1	2	−1	0.00
England	1	0	0	1	0	5	−5	0.00
Ghana	1	0	0	1	0	3	−3	0.00
Honduras	1	1	0	0	1	0	+1	100.00
Hungary	1	0	0	1	0	2	−2	0.00
Ivory Coast	1	1	0	0	2	0	+2	100.00
Mexico	1	0	0	1	0	5	−5	0.00
Panama	1	1	0	0	2	1	+1	100.00
Slovakia	1	0	0	1	1	4	−3	0.00
South Africa	1	0	1	0	2	2	+0	0.00
Venezuela	1	1	0	0	2	1	+1	100.00
Total	14	5	2	7	12	26	−14	35.71

=== In AFC U-20 Asian Cup ===
Opponent	Pld	W	D	L	GF	GA	GD	Win %
Australia	4	1	1	2	6	7	−1	25.00
Bangladesh	1	1	0	0	6	1	+5	100.00
China	6	0	1	5	4	14	−10	0.00
Chinese Taipei	1	1	0	0	8	1	+7	100.00
India	1	1	0	0	3	0	+3	100.00
Indonesia	2	1	0	1	4	2	+2	50.00
Iran	3	0	3	0	1	1	+0	0.00
Iraq	5	1	1	3	5	7	−2	20.00
Japan	7	2	2	3	7	11	−4	28.57
Jordan	1	0	1	0	0	0	+0	0.00
Kuwait	1	0	1	0	1	1	+0	0.00
Myanmar	1	0	0	1	0	1	−1	0.00
North Korea	1	1	0	0	3	1	+2	100.00
Pakistan	1	0	0	1	1	2	−1	0.00
Qatar	2	1	0	1	2	3	−1	50.00
Saudi Arabia	3	1	1	1	3	4	−1	33.33
South Korea	5	1	1	3	4	12	−8	20.00
Syria	3	1	1	1	3	3	+0	33.33
Thailand	3	2	0	1	11	5	+6	66.67
Uzbekistan	2	1	1	0	4	3	+1	50.00
Vietnam	3	2	1	0	7	1	+6	66.67
Total	56	18	15	23	83	80	+3	32.14

== Former squads ==
- 2009 FIFA U-20 World Cup squads
- 2003 FIFA under-20 World Cup squads - UAE
- 1997 FIFA under-20 World Cup squads - UAE

== See also ==
- United Arab Emirates national football team
- United Arab Emirates national under-17 football team
