= Arab Cup U-20 =

- Founded: 1983; 43 years ago, as Palestine Cup for Youth; 2011; 15 years ago, as Arab Cup U-20
- Region: Arab world (UAFA)
- Teams: 18
- Current champions: Saudi Arabia (3rd title)
- Most championships: Saudi Arabia (3 titles)
- 2022 Arab Cup U-20

The Arab Cup U-20 (Arabic: كأس العرب للمنتخبات تحت 20 سنة) is an international football competition organised by the Union of Arab Football Associations, contested by the U-20 national teams in the Arab world. The teams come from CAF and AFC. Some non-Arab nations, such as Senegal or Uzbekistan, have also been invited on occasion.

== History ==
The competition was created in 1983 as the Palestine Cup for Youth (Arabic: كأس فلسطين للشباب) replacing the Palestine Cup of senior teams; the first edition was held in Morocco, which Iraq won after beating Saudi Arabia in the final. After a 22-year long hiatus, in 2011 the competition returned as the Arab Cup U-20 under the auspices of the UAFA.

== Results ==
Ed.	Year	Host	First place game			Third place game		
Ed.	Year	Host	(gold) Champion	Score	(silver) Runner-up	(bronze) Third place	Score	Fourth place
Palestine Cup for Youth
1	1983	Morocco	Iraq	1–0 (a.e.t.)	Saudi Arabia	Morocco	2–0	United Arab Emirates
2	1985	Algeria	Saudi Arabia	2–1	Algeria	Iraq	2–0	Tunisia
3	1989	Iraq	Morocco	3–1	Iraq	Saudi Arabia	1–1 (4–3 p)	Bahrain
—	1992	Sudan	Cancelled			Cancelled		
Arab Cup U-20
4	2011	Morocco	Morocco	3–3 (3–1 p)	Saudi Arabia	No semi-finals		
5	2012	Jordan	Tunisia	4–2	Saudi Arabia	Libya	4–0	Algeria
—	2014	Qatar	Cancelled			Cancelled		
6	2020	Saudi Arabia	Senegal	1–0	Tunisia	Egypt and Morocco		
7	2021	Egypt	Saudi Arabia	2–1	Algeria	Egypt and Tunisia		
8	2022	Saudi Arabia	Saudi Arabia	1–1 (5–3 p)	Egypt	Algeria and Palestine		
9	2026	Iraq	TBD			TBD		
10	2028	Egypt	TBD			TBD		

== Statistics ==
=== Summary ===
Team	Winners	Runners-up	Third place	Fourth place	Semi-finalist
Saudi Arabia	3 (1985, 2021, 2022)	3 (1983, 2011, 2012)	1 (1989)	–	–
Morocco	2 (1989, 2011)	–	1 (1983)	–	1 (2020)
Iraq	1 (1983)	1 (1989)	1 (1985)	–	–
Tunisia	1 (2012)	1 (2020)	–	1 (1985)	1 (2021)
Senegal	1 (2020)	–	–	–	–
Algeria	–	2 (1985, 2021)	–	1 (2012)	1 (2022)
Egypt	–	1 (2022)	–	–	2 (2020, 2021)
Bahrain	–	–	–	1 (1989)	–
Libya	–	–	1 (2012)	–	–
United Arab Emirates	–	–	–	1 (1983)	–
Palestine	–	–	–	–	1 (2022)

=== Participating nations ===
Team	(Morocco) 1983	(Algeria) 1985	(Iraq) 1989	(Morocco) 2011	(Jordan) 2012	(Qatar) ~~2014~~	(Saudi Arabia) 2020	(Egypt) 2021	(Saudi Arabia) 2022	Years
Algeria	5th	2nd	GS	GS	4th		QF	2nd	SF	8
Bahrain	GS		4th	GS			QF		GS	5
Comoros							W	QF		1
Djibouti						~~Q~~	GS	GS	GS	3
Egypt				GS			SF	SF	2nd	4
Iraq	1st	3rd	2nd	GS	GS	~~Q~~	QF	GS	GS	8
Jordan	GS		GS		GS				QF	4
Kuwait	GS		GS	GS	GS		GS			5
Lebanon		GS				~~Q~~		GS	GS	3
Libya					3rd		QF		GS	3
Madagascar							GS			1
Mauritania	×	GS			GS	~~Q~~	GS	GS	GS	5
Morocco	3rd	GS	1st	1st	GS		SF	QF	QF	8
Niger								GS		1
Oman	GS		GS						GS	3
Palestine	GS	QF	GS	GS			GS		SF	6
Qatar	6th	QF	QF		GS	~~Q~~	W			4
Saudi Arabia	2nd	1st	3rd	2nd	2nd	~~Q~~	GS	1st	1st	8
Senegal							1st	QF		2
Somalia									GS	1
Sudan				GS	GS	~~Q~~	GS		GS	4
Syria	7th	QF		GS	GS					4
Tajikistan								QF		1
Tunisia	8th	4th	QF		1st	~~Q~~	2nd	SF	QF	7
United Arab Emirates	4th	QF	QF				GS	GS	GS	6
Uzbekistan								GS		1
Yemen (Note: Includes participations as North Yemen between 1967 and 1990)	GS	GS	GS					GS	QF	5
Total	16	12	14	10	12	~~8~~	16	16	18	

== See also ==
- FIFA Arab Cup
- Arab Cup U-17
- 2002 Palestine Solidarity Tournament
