= 2002 Palestine Solidarity Tournament =

دورة التضامن الفلسطيني 2002

Tournament details
- Host country: Yemen
- Dates: 19 – 23 May
- Teams: 4 (from 2 confederations)
- Venue: 1 (in 1 host city)

Final positions
- Champions: Algeria (1st title)
- Runners-up: Yemen
- Third place: Oman
- Fourth place: Palestine

Tournament statistics
- Matches played: 6
- Goals scored: 16 (2.67 per match)

The 2002 Palestine Solidarity Tournament was the tournament held in Sanaa, Yemen from 19 to 23 May 2002 in solidarity of Palestine for under 23 national teams.

== Participating teams ==
The Olympic teams under 23 years of age that participated in this tournament:

- Algeria
- Oman
- Palestine
- Yemen (hosts)

== Final tournament ==
=== Matches ===
19 May 2002

Algeria	1–1	Oman

Sanaa
19 May 2002

Yemen	2–0	Palestine

Sanaa

21 May 2002

Algeria	3–1	Palestine

Sanaa
22 May 2002

Yemen	2–0	Oman

Sanaa

23 May 2002

Oman	3–0	Palestine

Sanaa
23 May 2002

Yemen	1–2	Algeria

Sanaa

=== Final standing ===
Pos	Team	Pld	W	D	L	GF	GA	GD	Pts	Qualification
1	Algeria	3	2	1	0	6	3	+3	7	Champions
2	Yemen (H)	3	2	0	1	5	2	+3	6	
3	Oman	3	1	1	1	4	3	+1	4	
4	Palestine	3	0	0	3	1	8	−7	0	

Rules for classification: Group stage tiebreakers
(H) Hosts
