= Youssef Essaiydy =

Moroccan professional footballer

Personal information
- Date of birth: 16 August 1994 (age 32)
- Place of birth: Casablanca, Morocco
- Height: 1.75 m (5 ft 9 in)
- Position: Midfielder

Youth career
- Académie Mohammed VI

Senior career*
Years	Team	Apps	(Gls)
2012–2014	Chamois Niortais	7	(0)
2014–2019	RS Berkane		
- * Club domestic league appearances and goals as of 11:23, 27 June 2014 (UTC)

Youssef Essaiydy (Arabic: يوسف السعيدي; born 16 August 1994) is a Moroccan professional footballer who plays as a midfielder. He last played for RS Berkane.

== Career statistics ==
As of 31 May 2014.

Appearances and goals by club, season and competition
Club	Season	League			Coupe de France		Coupe de la Ligue		Total	
Club	Season	Division	Apps	Goals	Apps	Goals	Apps	Goals	Apps	Goals
Chamois Niortais	2012–13	Ligue 2	5	0	1	0	0	0	6	0
Chamois Niortais	2013–14	Ligue 2	2	0	0	0	1	0	3	0
Career totals			7	0	1	0	1	0	9	0
