= 2014 Arab Cup U-20 =

Tournament details
- Host country: Qatar
- City: Doha
- Dates: December 25 – January 5
- Teams: 8 (from 2 confederations)
- Venues: 2 (in 1 host city)

The 2014 Arab Cup U-20 was normally the sixth edition of the Arab Cup U-20. The tournament hosted by Qatar and was planned to be played between 2 and 15 June 2014, however because the 2014 FIFA World Cup, it was reported to a date between 25 December 2014 and 5 January 2015. And finally, it was definitively cancelled by the Union of Arab Football Associations.

The draw for the tournament took place on April 29, 2014, in Doha, Qatar.

== Participants ==
- Djibouti
- Iraq
- Lebanon
- Mauritania
- Qatar (hosts)
- Saudi Arabia
- Sudan
- Tunisia (holders)
