= Sadiq Mousa =

Iraqi footballer

Personal information
- Full name: Sadiq Mousa Binwan
- Date of birth: 20 October 1959 (age 67)
- Position: Midfielder

Senior career*
Years	Team	Apps	(Gls)
- Al-Jaish SC

International career
1984–1987	Iraq		
- * Club domestic league appearances and goals

Sadiq Mousa (born 20 October 1959) is a former Iraqi football forward. He competed in the men's tournament at the 1984 Summer Olympics. Mousa played for Iraq between 1984 and 1987.
