= Iraq national under-20 football team =

Iraq Under-20
- Nickname(s): Usood al-Rafidayn (Lions of Mesopotamia)
- Association: IFA
- Confederation: AFC (Asia)
- Sub-confederation: WAFF
- Head coach: Ahmed Salah
- Captain: Amir Faisal
- FIFA code: IRQ
First colours	Second colours	Third colours

First international
- Iraq 3–1 Saudi Arabia (Ahwaz, Iran; 24 February 1974)

Biggest win
- Iraq 15–0 Brunei (Buriram, Thailand; 25 September 2024)

Biggest defeat
- Brazil 6–1 Iraq (Córdoba, Argentina; 20 June 2001)

FIFA U-20 World Cup
- Appearances: 5 (first in 1977)
- Best result: Fourth Place (2013)

AFC U-20 Asian Cup
- Appearances: 17 (first in 1975)
- Best result: Champions (1975, 1977, 1978, 1988, 2000)
- Website: ifa.iq

The Iraq national under-20 football team represents Iraq in international football competitions in AFC U-20 Asian Cup which Iraq holds 5 titles, as well as any other international football tournaments. The team is controlled by the governing body for football in Iraq, Iraq Football Association (IFA).

The team has qualified five times for the FIFA U-20 World Cup, reaching fourth place in 2013.

Iraq U-20 have been awarded the AFC National Team of the Year award once in 2013, being the only U-20 team to win this award.

== Recent results and fixtures ==
The following is a list of match results in the last 12 months, as well as any future matches that have been scheduled.

Legend

Win Draw Loss Cancelled

=== 2026 ===
31 August 2027 AFC U-20 Asian Cup qualification	Iraq	1–2	Turkmenistan	Chonburi, Thailand
15:30	Malik 59'	Report	Gowşudow 15'; Orazdurdyýew 77'	Stadium: Chonburi Stadium; Referee: Ahmad Alaeddin (Lebanon)

3 September 2027 AFC U-20 Asian Cup qualification	United Arab Emirates	1–2	Iraq	Chonburi, Thailand
15:30	Muller 15'	Report	Al Shawi 45'; Al Zeyadi 68'	Stadium: Chonburi Stadium; Referee: Akhrol Riskullaev (Uzbekistan)

6 September 2027 AFC U-20 Asian Cup qualification	Iraq	3–1	Thailand	Chonburi, Thailand
19:30	Al-Shawi 10', 45'; Hasan 19'	Report	Chantawat 86'	Stadium: Chonburi Stadium; Referee: Ahmad Alaeddin (Lebanon)

== Players ==
=== Current squad ===
The following players were named in the squad for the 2025 AFC U-20 Asian Cup qualification.
Caps and goals correct as of 25 September 2024, after the game against Brunei

No.	Pos.	Player	Date of birth (age)	Caps	Goals	Club
1	GK	Laith Sajid		0	0	(Iraq Football Association) Al-Karma
12	GK	Wissam Ali		4	0	(Iraq Football Association) Naft Al-Wasat
22	GK	Ridha Mohammed		0	0	(Iraq Football Association)
2	DF	Mohammed Ghaleb	26 September 2005 (aged 18)	3	0	(Iraq Football Association) Al-Minaa
3	DF	Mousa Alaa		4	0	(Iraq Football Association) Al-Quwa Al-Jawiya
4	DF	Sajjad Hussein		0	0	(Iraq Football Association) Al-Karkh
6	DF	Hussein Fahim		6	1	(Iraq Football Association) Al-Karkh
13	DF	Hassan Emad		1	0	(Iraq Football Association) Duhok
14	DF	Ali Kareem		5	0	(Iraq Football Association) Al-Kahrabaa
17	DF	Muslim Mousa	11 March 2005 (aged 19)	16	1	(Iraq Football Association) Al-Minaa
5	MF	Yousef Qasim		0	0	(Iraq Football Association)
10	MF	Amir Faisal	1 May 2005 (aged 18)	6	2	(Iraq Football Association) Al-Karma
11	MF	Mustafa Nawaf	5 May 2005 (aged 18)	6	3	(Iraq Football Association) Al-Zawraa
15	MF	Ali Mokhalad		6	0	(Iraq Football Association) Al-Quwa Al-Jawiya
16	MF	Moammel Mahmoud		2	0	(Iraq Football Association) Naft Al-Wasat
18	MF	Sidad Haji		4	3	(Iraq Football Association) Zakho
21	MF	Laith Dhia		6	0	(Iraq Football Association) Al-Quwa Al-Jawiya
7	FW	Mohammed Jameel		19	3	(Iraq Football Association) Al-Hudood
8	FW	Halgurd Qais		6	3	(Iraq Football Association) Erbil
9	FW	Ali Akbar Taher	30 December 2006 (age 19)	5	0	(Iraq Football Association) Al-Quwa Al-Jawiya
19	FW	Ahmed Jasim		5	1	(Iraq Football Association) Al-Naft
20	FW	Karrar Jaafar	26 April 2006 (aged 17)	1	2	(Iraq Football Association) Al-Minaa
23	FW	Ayman Louay		6	4	(Iraq Football Association) Al-Gharraf

=== Recent call-ups ===
The following players have been called up within the last 12 months.

Pos.	Player	Date of birth (age)	Caps	Goals	Club	Latest call-up
^{PRE} Part of the preliminary squad^{INJ} Player injured^{CLB} Player refused by club or unable to attend due to club commitments^{U23} Player moved up to the Olympic team^{WD} Player withdrew for non-injury related reasons^{UNK} Unknown when the player was last with the squad

== Coaching staff ==
Position	Name	Nationality
Head coach:	Ahmed Salah	(Iraq)
Assistant coach:	Haidar Abdul-Jabar	(Iraq)
Assistant coach:	Ahmed Wali	(Iraq)
Assistant coach:	Ehsan Turki	(Iraq)
Goalkeeper coach:	Nouri Abid Zaid	(Iraq)
Fitness coach:	Waleed Jumaa	(Iraq)
Technical analyst:	Muntadher Mujbel	(Iraq)
Physiotherapist:	Falah Jassim	(Iraq)
Physiotherapist:	Ahmed Khaseif	(Iraq)
Managing Director:	Mohammed Nasser Shakroun	(Iraq)
Technical Supervisor:	Khalaf Jalal	(Iraq)
Team Manager:	Qahtan Al-Maliki	(Iraq)
Media Coordinator:	Nadeem Kareem	(Iraq)

Updated to match played April 2023

== Head coach history ==
Head coaches by years (2000–present)

As of 31 March 2024

Name	Period	Matches	Wins	Draws	Losses	Win %	Achievements
(Iraq) Thair Jassam	2000	10	4	3	3	40.00	
(Iraq) Adnan Hamad	2000	8	4	4	0	50.00	2000 AFC Youth Championship: Champions; 2001 FIFA World Youth Championship: Group Stage
(Iraq) Nazar Ashraf	2001	2	0	1	1	0.00	
(Iraq) Adnan Hamad	2001	7	3	0	4	42.86	
(Iraq) Nasrat Nassir	2001–2002	9	5	2	2	55.56	
(Iraq) Ahmed Radhi	2002	3	2	0	1	66.67	
(Iraq) Akram Salman	2003	0	0	0	0	—	
(Iraq) Hadi Mutanash	2004	0	0	0	0	—	
(Iraq) Abdelilah Abdul-Hamid	2005–2006	0	0	0	0	—	
(Iraq) Kadhim Al-Rubaie	2007	0	0	0	0	—	
(Iraq) Hakim Shaker	2008	12	3	5	4	25.00	
(Iraq) Hassan Ahmed	2009–2010	11	4	1	6	36.36	
(Iraq) Hakim Shaker	2011–2013	42	23	8	11	54.76	2012 AFC U-19 Championship: Runner-up; 2013 FIFA U-20 World Cup: Fourth Place; AFC National Team of the Year
(Iraq) Muwafaq Hussein	2013	2	1	1	0	50.00	
(Iraq) Rahim Hameed	2014	5	2	1	2	40.00	
(Iraq) Abbas Attiya	2015–2016	13	7	6	0	53.85	
(Iraq) Qahtan Chathir	2017–2021	26	8	9	9	30.77	2019 WAFF U-18 Championship: Champions
(Iraq) Emad Mohammed	2021–2024	25	10	6	9	40.00	2021 WAFF U-18 Championship: Champions; 2023 AFC U-20 Asian Cup: Runner-up; 2023 FIFA U-20 World Cup: Group Stage
(Iraq) Ehsan Turki	2024–	3	0	1	2	0.00	

== Competitive record ==
=== FIFA U-20 World Cup ===
FIFA U-20 World Cup record
Year	Result	Position	Pld	W	D	L	GF	GA	Squad
(Tunisia) 1977	Group stage	11th	3	1	0	2	6	8	Squad
(Japan) 1979	Qualified but Withdrew								
(Australia) 1981	Did not qualify								
(Mexico) 1983	Did not qualify								
(Soviet Union) 1985	Did not qualify								
(Chile) 1987	Did not qualify								
(Saudi Arabia) 1989	Quarterfinals	6th	4	3	0	1	5	2	Squad
(Portugal) 1991	Did not qualify								
(Australia) 1993	Did not qualify								
(Qatar) 1995	Did not qualify								
(Malaysia) 1997	Did not qualify								
(Nigeria) 1999	Did not qualify								
(Argentina) 2001	Group stage	19th	3	1	0	2	5	9	Squad
(United Arab Emirates) 2003	Did not qualify								
(Netherlands) 2005	Did not qualify								
(Canada) 2007	Did not qualify								
(Egypt) 2009	Did not qualify								
(Colombia) 2011	Did not qualify								
(Turkey) 2013	Fourth place	4th	7	3	3	1	11	11	Squad
(New Zealand) 2015	Did not qualify								
(South Korea) 2017	Did not qualify								
(Poland) 2019	Did not qualify								
(Argentina) 2023	Group stage	21st	3	0	1	2	0	7	Squad
(Chile) 2025	Did not qualify								
(Azerbaijan) (Uzbekistan) 2027	To be determined								
Total	Fourth place	5/24	20	8	4	8	27	37	—

FIFA U-20 World Cup history
Year	Round	Score	Result
1977
1977	Group stage	Iraq 1–3 Soviet Union	Loss
1977	Group stage	Iraq 5–1 Austria	Win
1977	Group stage	Iraq 0–4 Paraguay	Loss
1989
1989	Group stage	Iraq 1–0 Norway	Win
1989	Group stage	Iraq 2–0 Spain	Win
1989	Group stage	Iraq 1–0 Argentina	Win
1989	Quarterfinals	Iraq 1–2 United States	Loss
2001
2001	Group stage	Iraq 3–0 Canada	Win
2001	Group stage	Iraq 1–6 Brazil	Loss
2001	Group stage	Iraq 1–3 Germany	Loss
2013
2013	Group stage	Iraq 2–2 England	Draw
2013	Group stage	Iraq 2–1 Egypt	Win
2013	Group stage	Iraq 2–1 Chile	Win
2013	Round of 16	Iraq 1–0 (a.e.t.) Paraguay	Win
2013	Quarterfinals	Iraq 3–3 (a.e.t.)(pen 5-4) South Korea	Draw
2013	Semifinals	Iraq 1–1 (a.e.t.)(pen 6-7) Uruguay	Draw
2013	3rd Place	Iraq 0–3 Ghana	Loss
2023
2023	Group stage	Iraq 0–4 Uruguay	Loss
2023	Group stage	Iraq 0–3 Tunisia	Loss
2023	Group stage	Iraq 0–0 England	Draw

=== AFC U-20 Asian Cup record ===
AFC U-20 Asian Cup
Year	Result	Pld	W	D	L	GF	GA	Squad
(Kuwait) 1975	Champions	6	5	1	0	18	1	
(Thailand) 1976	Quarter-finals	4	3	1	0	13	1	
(Iran) 1977	Champions	5	5	0	0	19	4	
(Bangladesh) 1978	Champions	6	4	2	0	20	2	
(Thailand) 1980	did not enter							
(Thailand) 1982	Third Place	3	1	0	2	4	5	
(United Arab Emirates) 1985	did not qualify							
(Saudi Arabia) 1986	did not qualify							
(Qatar) 1988	Champions	5	2	3	0	5	3	
(Indonesia) 1990	did not enter							
(United Arab Emirates) 1992	did not enter							
(Indonesia) 1994	Fourth Place	6	2	2	2	8	8	
(South Korea) 1996	did not enter							
(Thailand) 1998	Group stage	4	1	0	3	6	13	
(Iran) 2000	Champions	6	3	3	0	11	3	
(Qatar) 2002	did not qualify							
(Malaysia) 2004	Quarterfinals	4	3	0	1	7	1	Squad
(India) 2006	Quarterfinals	4	2	1	1	8	5	Squad
(Saudi Arabia) 2008	Group stage	3	1	0	2	3	5	Squad
(China) 2010	Group stage	3	0	0	3	1	7	Squad
(United Arab Emirates) 2012	Runners-up	6	4	2	0	10	3	Squad
(Myanmar) 2014	Group stage	3	1	1	1	8	3	Squad
(Bahrain) 2016	Quarterfinals	4	2	2	0	7	2	Squad
(Indonesia) 2018	Group stage	3	0	1	2	3	9	Squad
(Uzbekistan) 2023	Runners-up	6	2	2	2	6	5	Squad
(China) 2025	Quarterfinals	4	1	2	1	4	4	Squad
(China) 2027	Qualified							Squad
Total	Best: Champions	85	42	23	20	160	84	

=== Arab Cup U-20 record ===
Arab Cup U-20
Year	Result	Pld	W	D	L	GF	GA
(Morocco) 2011	Group stage	4	2	0	2	6	4
(Jordan) 2012	Group stage	3	0	1	2	6	9
(Saudi Arabia) 2020	Quarter-finals	4	1	1	2	3	3
(Egypt) 2021	Group stage	3	1	1	1	7	5
(Saudi Arabia) 2022	Group stage	2	0	0	2	1	5
(Iraq) 2026	To be determined						
(Egypt) 2028	To be determined						
Total	Best: Quarter-finals	16	4	3	9	23	26

=== WAFF U-18 Championship record ===
WAFF U-18 Championship
Year	Result	Pld	W	D	L	GF	GA
(Palestine) 2019	Champions	4	1	2	1	5	6
(Iraq) 2021	Champions	5	3	1	1	9	1
(Saudi Arabia) 2024	Group stage	3	1	2	0	3	2
Total	Best: Champions	12	5	5	2	17	9

=== Minor tournaments ===
Year	Tournament	Result	GP	W	D	L	GF	GA
(Morocco) 1983	Palestine Cup of Nations for Youth	Champions	7	5	2	0	16	4
(Jordan) 1985	Al-Wehdat Championship	Champions	3	2	1	0	4	2
(Algeria) 1985	Palestine Cup of Nations for Youth	Third place	7	4	1	2	10	5
(Iraq) 1989	Palestine Cup of Nations for Youth	Runners-up	6	4	0	2	11	5
(Jordan) 1990	Al-Wehdat Championship	Champions	5	3	2	0	6	1
(Jordan) 2013	Jordan Friendly Quartet Championship	Champions	3	3	0	0	5	1

| class="col-break " |

=== Iraq Stars League ===
Season	P	W	D	L	F	A	GD	Pts	Notes
1990–91	13	4	5	4	8	13	–5	13	Second half of season
1993–94	25	8	8	9	33	29	+4	24	First half of season; replaced by Babil

== Honours ==
=== Titles ===
- FIFA U-20 World Cup

Fourth place: 2013

- AFC U-20 Asian Cup

(gold) Champions (5): 1975*, 1977, 1978*, 1988, 2000 (* shared)
(silver) Runners-up (2): 2012, 2023
(bronze) Third place: 1982

=== Awards ===
- AFC National Team of the Year: 2013

== See also ==
- Iraq national football team
- Iraq national under-23 football team
- Iraq national under-17 football team

== Head-to-head record ==
The following table shows Iraq's head-to-head record in the FIFA U-20 World Cup.

Opponent	Pld	W	D	L	GF	GA	GD	Win %
Argentina	1	1	0	0	1	0	+1	100.00
Austria	1	1	0	0	5	1	+4	100.00
Brazil	1	0	0	1	1	6	−5	0.00
Canada	1	1	0	0	3	0	+3	100.00
Chile	1	1	0	0	2	1	+1	100.00
Egypt	1	1	0	0	2	1	+1	100.00
England	2	0	2	0	2	2	+0	0.00
Germany	1	0	0	1	1	3	−2	0.00
Ghana	1	0	0	1	0	3	−3	0.00
Norway	1	1	0	0	1	0	+1	100.00
Paraguay	2	1	0	1	1	4	−3	50.00
South Korea	1	0	1	0	3	3	+0	0.00
Soviet Union	1	0	0	1	1	3	−2	0.00
Spain	1	1	0	0	2	0	+2	100.00
Tunisia	1	0	0	1	0	3	−3	0.00
United States	1	0	0	1	1	2	−1	0.00
Uruguay	2	0	1	1	1	5	−4	0.00
Total	20	8	4	8	27	37	−10	40.00
