= Kenitra Municipal Stadium =

Multi-purpose stadium in Rabat, Morocco

Coordinates: 34°15′9″N 6°34′17″W

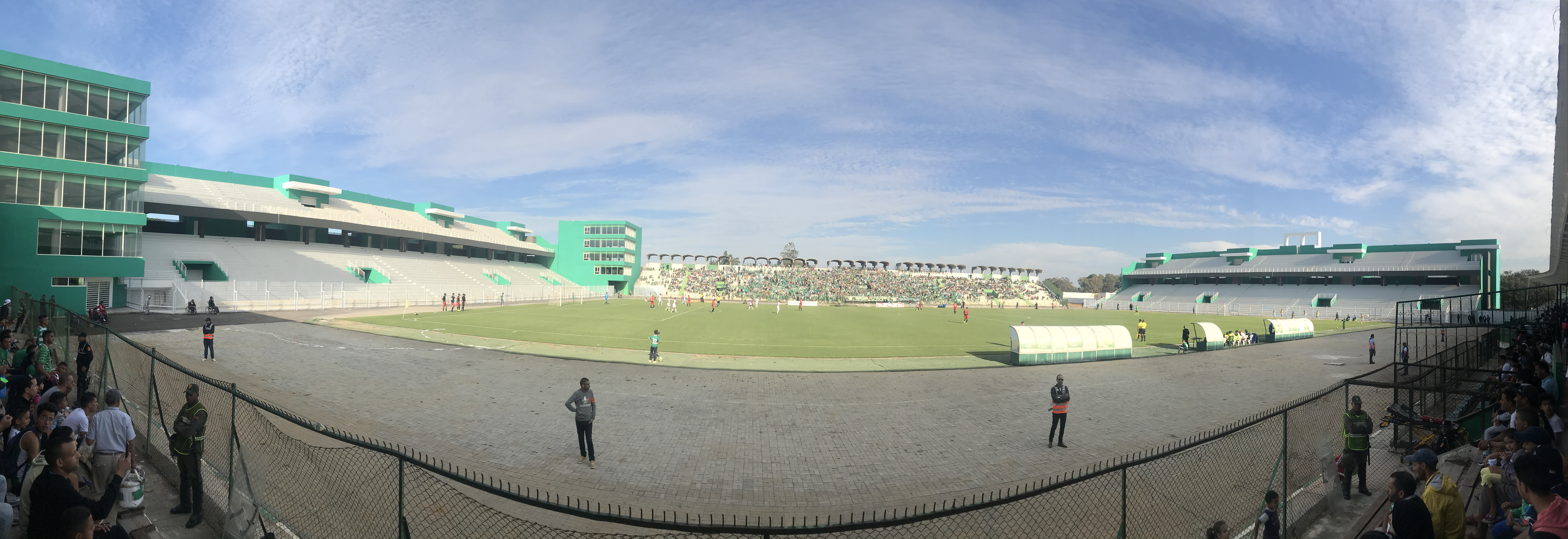
- Interactive map of Kenitra Municipal Stadium
- Location: Kenitra, Morocco
- Owner: Kenitra Municipality
- Capacity: 28,000
- Surface: grass

Construction
- Opened: 1941
- Renovated: 2017, 2026-

Tenants
- Kénitra AC (1941–present); AS FAR (2023–2025); FUS Rabat (2024–2025)

Kenitra Municipal Stadium is a multi-purpose stadium in Kenitra, Morocco. Inaugurated in 1941, the stadium is currently used primarily for football matches and is the home stadium of Kénitra AC. It has a capacity of up to 28,000 people.

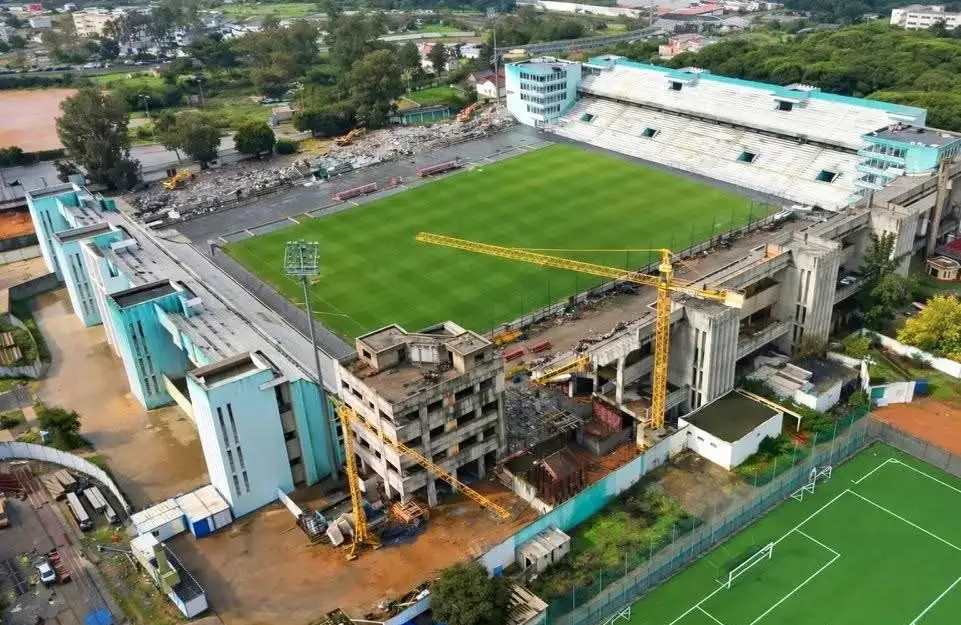
Kenitra Stadium (under renovation - Dec 2025)
