= 2012 Arab Cup U-20 =

كأس العرب للمنتخبات تحت 20 سنة

Tournament details
- Host country: Jordan
- City: Amman
- Dates: 4–18 July 2012
- Teams: 12 (from 2 confederations)
- Venues: 2 (in 1 host city)

Final positions
- Champions: Tunisia (1st title)
- Runners-up: Saudi Arabia
- Third place: Libya
- Fourth place: Algeria

Tournament statistics
- Matches played: 22
- Goals scored: 71 (3.23 per match)
- Top scorer(s): (Tunisia) Seifeddine Jaziri (6 goals)
- Best player: (Libya) Ahmed Mohamed Bashir
- Best goalkeeper: (Libya) Mouadh Mansouri
- Fair play award: Algeria

The 2012 Arab Cup U-20 is the fifth edition of the Arab Cup U-20. The tournament was hosted by Jordan between 4 and 18 July 2012.

The draw for the tournament took place on April 11, 2012, in Amman, Jordan.

== Participants ==
- Algeria
- Iraq
- Jordan (Hosts)
- Kuwait
- Libya
- Mauritania
- Morocco (Holders)
- Qatar
- Saudi Arabia
- Sudan
- Syria
- Tunisia

== Venues ==
King Abdullah Stadium, Amman	Amman International Stadium, Amman
King Abdullah Stadium	Amman International Stadium
Capacity: 20,000	Capacity: 25,000

== Group stage ==
=== Group A ===
Team	Pld	W	D	L	GF	GA	GD	Pts
Saudi Arabia	3	2	1	0	8	2	+6	7
Sudan	3	1	1	1	3	5	−2	4
Kuwait	3	1	0	2	4	7	−3	3
Jordan	3	0	2	1	1	2	−1	2

4 July 2012
17:00

Kuwait	2–3	Sudan
Al-Bazali 7'; Al-Hadjiri 38'		Al-Toom 39'; Taqi-Eddine 65', 82'

Amman International Stadium, Amman
Referee: Safwan Othman (Syria)
4 July 2012
20:30

Jordan	1–1	Saudi Arabia
Al-Bashtawi 88'		Kanabah 9'

Amman International Stadium, Amman
Referee: Youssef Essrayri (Tunisia)

7 July 2012
17:00

Sudan	0–3	Saudi Arabia
		Al-Absi 47'; Al-Shehri 58', 90+3'

King Abdullah Stadium, Amman
Referee: Khamis Al-Kuwari (Qatar)
7 July 2012
20:30

Jordan	0–1	Kuwait
		Al-Bazali 37'

King Abdullah Stadium, Amman
Referee: Rami Al-Kaabi (Bahrain)

10 July 2012
19:00

Saudi Arabia	4–1	Kuwait
Asiri 3'; Al-Najrani 55'; Bilal 80', 90'		Al-Bazali 25' (pen.)

King Abdullah Stadium, Amman
Referee: Radwan Ghandour (Lebanon)
10 July 2012
19:00

Sudan	0–0	Jordan

Amman International Stadium, Amman
Referee: Yasser Al-Rawahi (Oman)

=== Group B ===
Team	Pld	W	D	L	GF	GA	GD	Pts
Algeria	3	2	1	0	8	0	+8	7
Libya	3	2	1	0	3	1	+2	7
Mauritania	3	1	0	2	4	5	−1	3
Qatar	3	0	0	3	2	11	−9	0

5 July 2012
17:00

Qatar	1–4	Mauritania
Salem 17'		Anjakou 12', 38', 68'; Anyass 18'

King Abdullah Stadium, Amman
Referee: Murad Al Zawahreh (Jordan)
5 July 2012
20:30

Algeria	0–0	Libya

King Abdullah Stadium, Amman
Referee: Sami Mazyad Al-Nemari (Saudi Arabia)

8 July 2012
17:00

Mauritania	0–1	Libya
		Al-Faraj 57'

Amman International Stadium, Amman
Referee: Youssef Essrayri (Tunisia)
8 July 2012
20:30

Qatar	0–5	Algeria
		Boulbrima 20', 48'; Haddouche 50'; Benkhemassa 90+1'; Zeghli 90+3'

Amman International Stadium, Amman
Referee: Safwan Othman (Syria)

11 July 2012
19:00

Libya	2–1	Qatar
... 45'... 62'		... 70' (pen.)

King Abdullah Stadium, Amman
Referee: Rami Al-Kaabi (Bahrain)
11 July 2012
19:00

Algeria	3–0	Mauritania
Mansouri 10'; Chenni 72'; Haddouche 90+1'

Amman International Stadium, Amman
Referee: Youssef Al-Marzouq (Kuwait)

=== Group C ===
Team	Pld	W	D	L	GF	GA	GD	Pts
Tunisia	3	2	0	1	7	5	+2	6
Syria	3	1	2	0	3	2	+1	5
Morocco	3	1	1	1	3	3	0	4
Iraq	3	0	1	2	6	9	−3	1

6 July 2012
17:00

Iraq	2–2	Syria
Ismail 30' (pen.); Adnan 58'		Jwayed 3' (pen.); Kharbin 81'

Amman International Stadium, Amman
Referee: Yasser Al-Rawahi (Oman)
6 July 2012
20:30

Morocco	1–2	Tunisia
Saidi 81'		Jaziri 11'; Louati 61'

Amman International Stadium, Amman
Referee: Radwan Ghandour (Lebanon)

9 July 2012
17:00

Syria	1–0	Tunisia
Salem 34'

Amman International Stadium, Amman
Referee: Youssef Al-Marzouq (Kuwait)
9 July 2012
20:30

Iraq	1–2	Morocco
Hattab 29'		Touali 18' (pen.); Othmane 90'

Amman International Stadium, Amman
Referee: Murad Al-Zawahreh (Jordan)

12 July 2012
19:00

Tunisia	5–3	Iraq
Ben Ouanes 14'; Jaziri 26'; Ounalli 35'; Rjaibi 80'; Trabelsi 83'		Shokan

Amman International Stadium, Amman
Referee: Khamis Al-Kuwari (Qatar)
12 July 2012
19:00

Morocco	0–0	Syria

King Abdullah Stadium
Referee: Sami Mazyad Al-Nemari (Saudi Arabia)

=== Best placed runner-up ===
The team that finish highest of all group runners-up will also proceed to the semi-final stage.

Team	Pld	W	D	L	GF	GA	GD	Pts
Libya	3	2	1	0	3	1	+2	7
Syria	3	1	2	0	3	2	+1	5
Sudan	3	1	1	1	3	5	−2	4

== Knockout stage ==
Semi-finals
15 July - Amman
Saudi Arabia	3
Libya	1
15 July - Amman
Algeria	2
Tunisia	3

Final
18 July - Amman
Saudi Arabia	2
Tunisia	4
Third place
17 July - Amman
Libya	4
Algeria	0

=== Semi finals ===
15 July 2012
19:00

Saudi Arabia	3–1	Libya
Al-Muwallad 37', 84'; Madu 41'		Errishi 18' (pen.)

Amman International Stadium, Amman
Referee: Khamis Al-Kuwari (Qatar)

15 July 2012
19:00

Algeria	2–3	Tunisia
Kadri 45'; Mansouri 90+2'	Report	Madani 2' (o.g.); Jaziri 16', 50'

King Abdullah Stadium, Amman
Referee: Murad Al-Zawahreh (Jordan)

=== Third place play-off ===
17 July 2010
19:00

Libya	4–0	Algeria
Errishi 54'; Al-Jareh 63', 71'; Al-Fitori 78'

King Abdullah Stadium, Amman
Referee: Yasser Al-Rawahi (Oman)

=== Final ===
18 July 2012
19:00

Saudi Arabia	2–4	Tunisia
Al-Shehri 43'; Kanabah 70'	Report	Jaziri 10', 69'; Louati 39'; Machmoum 79'

Amman International Stadium, Amman
Referee: Rami Al-Kaabi (Bahrain)

== Winners ==
2012 Arab U-20 Championship

Tunisia
First title

== Award winners ==
- Fair play Award: Algeria
- Best player: (Libya) Ahmed Mohamed Bashir
- Top goal scorer (Golden Boot): (Tunisia) Seifeddine Jaziri (6 goals)
- Best goalkeeper: (Libya) Mouadh Mansouri
