= 1982 AFC Youth Championship =

Tournament details
- Host country: Thailand
- Dates: 18–22 December
- Teams: 4 (from 1 confederation)
- Venue: 1 (in 1 host city)

Final positions
- Champions: South Korea (6th title)

Tournament statistics
- Matches played: 6
- Goals scored: 17 (2.83 per match)

The 1982 AFC Youth Championship was held from 18 to 22 December 1982 in Bangkok, Thailand.

== Qualifying tournament ==
=== Qualified Teams ===
- China
- Iraq
- South Korea
- United Arab Emirates

South Korea took the place of North Korea, who were disqualified after the AFC handed the North Korean FA a two-year suspension for assaulting match officials following the final whistle of their Asian Games semi-final.

== Final standings ==
Teams	Pts	GP	W	D	L	GF	GA	GD
South Korea	5	3	2	1	0	7	2	+5
China	4	3	1	2	0	4	3	+1
Iraq	2	3	1	0	2	4	5	−1
United Arab Emirates	1	3	0	1	2	2	7	−5

=== Matches and Results ===
18 December

China	2–1	Iraq
		Hadi

Bangkok, Thailand

18 December

United Arab Emirates	0–4	South Korea

Bangkok, Thailand

20 December

Iraq	2–1	United Arab Emirates
Radhi; Hamad

Bangkok, Thailand

20 December

South Korea	1–1	China

Bangkok, Thailand

22 December

South Korea	2–1	Iraq
		Hamid

Bangkok, Thailand

22 December

China	1–1	United Arab Emirates

Bangkok, Thailand

== Winners ==
AFC Youth Championship 1982 winners

South Korea
sixth title

== Qualified for the 1983 FIFA World Youth Championship ==
- South Korea
- China
