= 1992 AFC Youth Championship =

Tournament details
- Host country: َ United Arab Emirates
- Dates: 24 September – 6 October
- Teams: 9 (from 2 confederations)
- Venue: 1 (in 1 host city)

Final positions
- Champions: Saudi Arabia (2nd title)
- Runners-up: South Korea
- Third place: Japan
- Fourth place: United Arab Emirates

Tournament statistics
- Matches played: 20
- Goals scored: 62 (3.1 per match)

The 1992 AFC Youth Championship was held from September 25 to October 10, 1992, in Dubai, United Arab Emirates. The tournament was won by for the second time by Saudi Arabia in the final against Korea Republic.

== Group stage ==
=== Group A ===
Team	Pld	W	D	L	GF	GA	GD	Pts
United Arab Emirates	3	2	1	0	5	0	+5	5
Japan	3	2	0	1	4	2	+2	4
Iran	3	1	1	1	2	2	0	3
India	3	0	0	3	0	7	−7	0

25 September 1992

United Arab Emirates	0–0	Iran

25 September 1992

India	0–2	Japan

27 September 1992

Japan	2–0	Iran

27 September 1992

India	0–3	United Arab Emirates

29 September 1992

United Arab Emirates	2–0	Japan

29 September 1992

Iran	2–0	India

=== Group B ===
Team	Pld	W	D	L	GF	GA	GD	Pts
South Korea	4	3	0	1	16	7	+9	6
Saudi Arabia	4	3	0	1	9	3	+6	6
Qatar	4	3	0	1	9	5	+4	6
Thailand	4	1	0	3	5	13	−8	2
New Zealand	4	0	0	4	2	13	−11	0

24 September 1992

Qatar	2–0	Saudi Arabia

24 September 1992

South Korea	8–1	Thailand

26 September 1992

New Zealand	1–5	South Korea

26 September 1992

Thailand	0–2	Saudi Arabia

28 September 1992

New Zealand	0–2	Thailand

28 September 1992

South Korea	3–1	Qatar

30 September 1992

Saudi Arabia	3–1	New Zealand

30 September 1992

Thailand	2–3	Qatar

2 October 1992

Saudi Arabia	4–0	South Korea

2 October 1992

Qatar	3–0	New Zealand

== Knockout stage ==
Semi-finals
4 October
United Arab Emirates	0
Saudi Arabia (aet)	2
4 October
South Korea	2
Japan	1

Final
6 October
Saudi Arabia	2
South Korea	0
Third place
6 October
United Arab Emirates	0
Japan	3

=== Semifinal ===
October 4, 1992

United Arab Emirates	0 – 2	Saudi Arabia

Dubai, United Arab Emirates

October 4, 1992

South Korea	2 – 1	Japan

Dubai, United Arab Emirates

=== Third-place match ===
October 6, 1992

United Arab Emirates	0 – 3	Japan

Dubai, United Arab Emirates

=== Final ===
October 6, 1992

Saudi Arabia	2 – 0	South Korea

Dubai, United Arab Emirates

== Winner ==
AFC Youth Championship 1992 winners

Saudi Arabia
Second title

- Saudi Arabia, Korea Republic qualified for 1993 FIFA World Youth Championship.
