= 2000 AFC Youth Championship =

Tournament details
- Host country: Iran
- Dates: 12–26 November
- Teams: 10 (from 1 confederation)
- Venue: 1 (in 1 host city)

Final positions
- Champions: Iraq (5th title)
- Runners-up: Japan
- Third place: China
- Fourth place: Iran

Tournament statistics
- Matches played: 24
- Goals scored: 79 (3.29 per match)
- Top scorer: (Iraq) Emad Mohammed (4 goals)

The 2000 AFC Youth Championship was held between November 12 and 26 in Iran. It was won by Iraq 2–1 over Japan.

== Participants ==
- Iran (qualified as hosts)
- China
- Iraq
- Japan
- South Korea
- Kuwait
- Oman
- Pakistan
- Thailand
- United Arab Emirates

The teams that reached the semi-final qualified for the 2001 FIFA World Youth Championship in Argentina.

== Venues ==
All Matches in Shahid Shiroudi Stadium, Tehran.

Tehran
Shahid Shiroudi Stadium
Capacity: 30,000
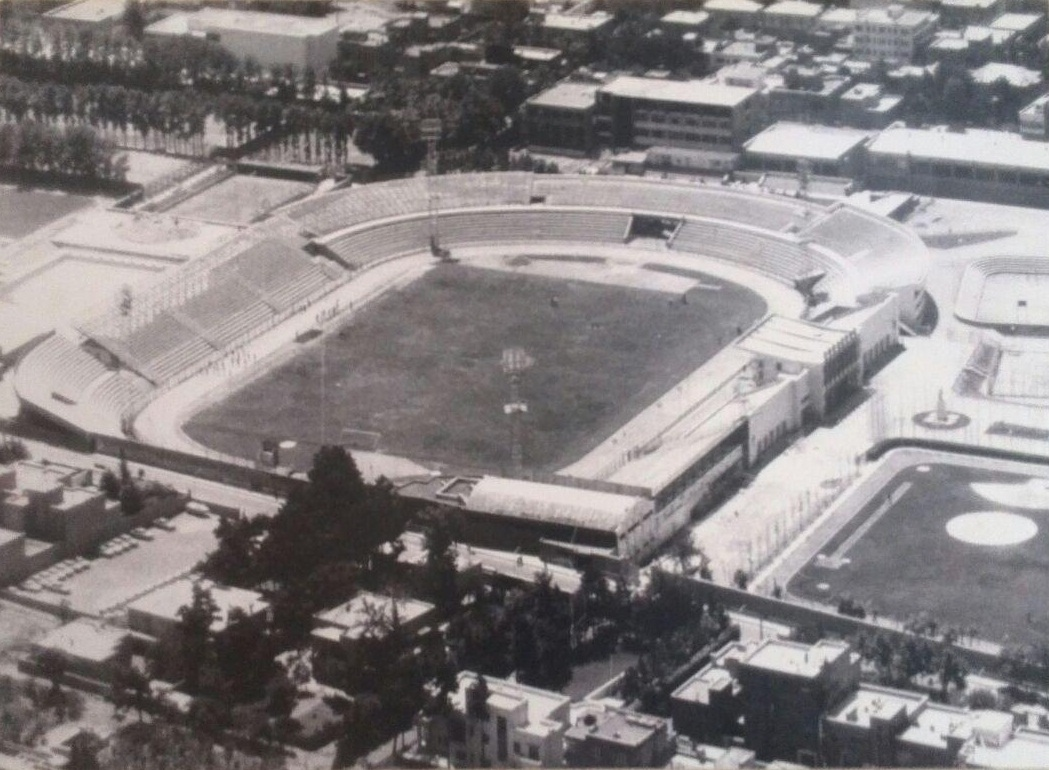

== Group stage ==
The original draw had Kuwait in the same group as Iraq. Kuwait protested that they did not want to be in Iraq's group due to political tensions, so the AFC did a re-draw to separate Iraq and Kuwait.

=== Group A ===
Team	Pts	Pld	W	D	L	GF	GA	GD
Iran	12	4	4	0	0	11	4	+7
Japan	7	4	2	1	1	12	6	+6
Kuwait	6	4	2	0	2	8	8	±0
Oman	2	4	0	2	2	2	6	−4
Thailand	1	4	0	1	3	4	13	−9

12 November 2000

Iran	2–1	Thailand

Shahid Shiroudi Stadium, Tehran
12 November 2000

Oman	0–1	Kuwait

Shahid Shiroudi Stadium, Tehran

14 November 2000

Kuwait	2–3	Iran

Shahid Shiroudi Stadium, Tehran
14 November 2000

Japan	6–1	Thailand

Shahid Shiroudi Stadium, Tehran

16 November 2000

Japan	2–2	Oman

Shahid Shiroudi Stadium, Tehran
16 November 2000

Thailand	2–5	Kuwait

Shahid Shiroudi Stadium, Tehran

18 November 2000

Kuwait	0–3	Japan

Shahid Shiroudi Stadium, Tehran
18 November 2000

Oman	0–3	Iran

Shahid Shiroudi Stadium, Tehran

20 November 2000

Thailand	0–0	Oman

Shahid Shiroudi Stadium, Tehran
20 November 2000

Iran	3–1	Japan

Shahid Shiroudi Stadium, Tehran

=== Group B ===
Team	Pts	Pld	W	D	L	GF	GA	GD
China	10	4	3	1	0	5	1	+4
Iraq	8	4	2	2	0	9	2	+7
South Korea	7	4	2	1	1	11	3	+8
Pakistan	3	4	1	0	3	2	15	−13
United Arab Emirates	0	4	0	0	4	6	12	−6

13 November 2000

South Korea	0–1	China

Shahid Shiroudi Stadium, Tehran
13 November 2000

United Arab Emirates	1–2	Pakistan

Shahid Shiroudi Stadium, Tehran

15 November 2000

Pakistan	0–7	South Korea
		? 4' (o.g.); Cho Jae-jin 24', 44'; Lee Chun-soo 54' (pen.); Kim Byung-chae

Shahid Shiroudi Stadium, Tehran
15 November 2000

Iraq	0–0	China

Shahid Shiroudi Stadium, Tehran

17 November 2000

Iraq	3–2	United Arab Emirates
Turki; Ahmad

Shahid Shiroudi Stadium, Tehran
17 November 2000

China	1–0	Pakistan

Shahid Shiroudi Stadium, Tehran

19 November 2000

Pakistan	0–6	Iraq
		Ahmad; Yousif; Mohammed; Ibrahim

Shahid Shiroudi Stadium, Tehran
19 November 2000

United Arab Emirates	2–4	South Korea

Shahid Shiroudi Stadium, Tehran

21 November 2000

South Korea	0–0	Iraq

Shahid Shiroudi Stadium, Tehran
21 November 2000

China	3–1	United Arab Emirates

Shahid Shiroudi Stadium, Tehran

== Knockout stage ==
Semi-finals
November 24
Iran	0 (6)
Iraq (pen)	0 (7)
November 24
China	0
Japan	2

Final
November 26
Iraq (GG)	2
Japan	1
Third place
November 26
China (pen)	2 (6)
Iran	2 (5)

=== Semi-finals ===
24 November 2000

Iran	0–0 (a.e.t.)	Iraq
Penalties
	6–7

Shahid Shiroudi Stadium, Tehran
Attendance: 30,000
24 November 2000

China	0–2	Japan

Shahid Shiroudi Stadium, Tehran
Attendance: 30,000

=== Third place match ===
26 November 2000

China	2–2 (a.e.t.)	Iran
Qu Bo		Javad Kazemian (pen.); Eman Mobali
Penalties
	6–5

Shahid Shiroudi Stadium, Tehran
Attendance: 30,000

=== Final ===
26 November 2000

Iraq	2–1 (a.e.t.)	Japan
Emad Mohammed 16', 104'		Yutaka Tahara 61'

Shahid Shiroudi Stadium, Tehran

== Winners ==
AFC Youth Championship 2000 winners

Iraq
Fifth title

== Qualification to World Youth Championship ==
The following teams qualified for the 2001 FIFA World Youth Championship.

- Iraq
- Japan
- China
- Iran
