= 1985 AFC Youth Championship =

Tournament details
- Host country: United Arab Emirates
- Dates: 15–22 March
- Teams: 4 (from 1 confederation)
- Venue: 1 (in 1 host city)

Final positions
- Champions: China PR (1st title)
- Runners-up: Saudi Arabia

Tournament statistics
- Matches played: 6
- Goals scored: 25 (4.17 per match)

The 1985 AFC Youth Championship was held in March, 1985 in Abu Dhabi, United Arab Emirates. The tournament was won by for the first time by China PR in the final tournaments in round-robin format.

== Qualification ==
=== Qualified teams ===
- Saudi Arabia (West Asia zone winners)
- United Arab Emirates (West Asia zone runners-up)
- China (East Asia zone winners)
- Thailand (East Asia zone runners-up)

== Final standing ==
Team	Pld	W	D	L	GF	GA	GD	Pts
China (Champions)	3	2	1	0	5	3	+2	5
Saudi Arabia	3	1	2	0	8	5	+3	4
United Arab Emirates	3	1	1	1	9	4	+5	3
Thailand	3	0	0	3	3	13	−10	0

=== Match results ===
March 15, 1985

China	1 – 0	United Arab Emirates
Gao Hongbo

Abu Dhabi, United Arab Emirates
March 16, 1985

Saudi Arabia	4 – 1	Thailand

Abu Dhabi, United Arab Emirates

March 18, 1985

China	2 – 2	Saudi Arabia
Gao Hongbo

Abu Dhabi, United Arab Emirates
March 19, 1985

United Arab Emirates	7 – 1	Thailand

Abu Dhabi, United Arab Emirates

March 21, 1985

China	2 – 1	Thailand
Gao Hongbo

Abu Dhabi, United Arab Emirates
March 22, 1985

United Arab Emirates	2 – 2	Saudi Arabia

Abu Dhabi, United Arab Emirates

== Winner ==
AFC Youth Championship 1985 winners

China
First title

- China PR, Saudi Arabia qualified for 1985 FIFA World Youth Championship.
