= 2022–23 in Hong Kong football =

Football in Hong Kong
- Season: 2022–23

Men's football
- Premier League: Kitchee
- First Division League: Central & Western
- Second Division League: 3 Sing
- Third Division League: WSE
- FA Cup: Kitchee
- Senior Shield: Kitchee
- Sapling Cup: Southern

This article summarises Hong Kong football in the 2022–23 season.

== National teams ==
Source: HKFA

=== Men's ===
==== Senior ====
| 23 March 2023 Friendly | Hong Kong | 1–1 | Singapore | Mong Kok, Hong Kong |
| 20:00 UTC+8 | Lionel Tan 43' (o.g.) | Report | Lionel Tan 20' | Stadium: Mong Kok Stadium; Attendance: 5,910; Referee: Songkran Bunmeekiart (Thailand) |

| 28 March 2023 Friendly | Malaysia | 2–0 | Hong Kong | Johor, Malaysia |
| 22:00 UTC+8 | Akhyar 18'; Faisal 40' | | | Stadium: Sultan Ibrahim Stadium; Attendance: 4,593; Referee: Mongkolchai Pechsri (Thailand) |

| 15 June 2023 Friendly | Vietnam | 1–0 | Hong Kong | Hai Phong, Vietnam |
| 19:30 UTC+7 | Quế Ngọc Hải 32' (pen.) | | | Stadium: Lạch Tray Stadium; Attendance: 19,689; Referee: Suhaizi Shukri (Malaysia) |

| 19 June 2023 Friendly | Hong Kong | 0–1 | Thailand | So Kon Po, Hong Kong |
| 20:00 UTC+8 | | | Teerasil 63' | Stadium: Hong Kong Stadium; Attendance: 13,434; Referee: Jansen Foo (Singapore) |

| 7 September 2023 Friendly | Cambodia | 1–1 | Hong Kong | Phnom Penh, Cambodia |
| 19:00 UTC+7 | Sophanat 90' | | Everton 21' | Stadium: National Olympic Stadium |

| 11 September 2023 Friendly | Hong Kong | 10–0 | Brunei | So Kon Po, Hong Kong |
| 20:00 UTC+8 | Everton 12', 59'; Tan Chun Lok 20'; Hélio 41'; Fernando 51'; Wong Wai 56'; Chan Siu Kwan 64', 83'; Poon Pui Hin 84', 87' | | | Stadium: Hong Kong Stadium; Attendance: 6,097; Referee: Warintorn Sassadee (Thailand) |

| 12 October 2023 2026 WCQ R1 | Hong Kong | 4–0 | Bhutan | So Kon Po, Hong Kong |
| 20:00 UTC+8 | Udebuluzor 10', 16'; Chan 28'; Norbu 35' (o.g.) | Report | | Stadium: Hong Kong Stadium; Attendance: 10,259; Referee: Razlan Joffri Ali (Malaysia) |

| 17 October 2023 2026 WCQ R1 | Bhutan | 2–0 (2–4 agg.) | Hong Kong | Thimphu, Bhutan |
| 18:00 UTC+6 | Gyeltshen 28'; Chogyal 47' | Report | | Stadium: Changlimithang Stadium; Attendance: 5,300; Referee: Thoriq Alkatiri (Indonesia) |

| 16 November 2023 2026 WCQ R2 | Iran | 4–0 | Hong Kong | Tehran, Iran |
| 18:00 UTC+3:30 | Azmoun 12', 15'; Taremi 87'; Rezaeian 90+2' | Report | | Stadium: Azadi Stadium; Attendance: 6,191; Referee: Nazmi Nasaruddin (Malaysia) |

| 21 November 2023 2026 WCQ R2 | Hong Kong | 2–2 | Turkmenistan | So Kon Po, Hong Kong |
| 20:00 UTC+8 | Wong Wai 12'; Camargo 65' | Report | Mingazow 4', 36' | Stadium: Hong Kong Stadium; Attendance: 6,601; Referee: Adel Al-Naqbi (United Arab Emirates) |

==== U-23 ====
| 24 March 2023 2023 Merlion Cup Semi-final | Singapore | 0–1 | Hong Kong | Kallang, Singapore |
| 20:30 UTC+8 | | | Ichikawa 40' | Stadium: Jalan Besar Stadium; Referee: Farhan Mohd (Singapore) |

| 26 March 2023 2023 Merlion Cup Final | Malaysia | 2–1 | Hong Kong | Kallang, Singapore |
| 21:15 UTC+8 | Najmudin 74'; Mazlan 79' | | Lau Ka Kiu 80' | Stadium: Jalan Besar Stadium; Referee: Ahmad A’Qashah |

| 15 June 2023 Friendly | Tajikistan | 1–1 | Hong Kong | Dushanbe, Tajikistan |
| 17:30 UTC+5 | Abdulmumin Zabirov 66' | | Matthew Slattery 90+2' | Stadium: Pamir Stadium; Referee: Sayodjon Zayniddinov (Tajikistan) |

| 19 June 2023 Friendly | Tajikistan | 2–1 | Hong Kong | Dushanbe, Tajikistan |
| 17:30 UTC+5 | | | | Stadium: Pamir Stadium |

| 6 September 2023 2024 AFC U-23 ACQ | Iran | 3–0 | Hong Kong | Tashkent, Uzbekistan |
| 17:00 UTC+5 | Hazbavi 2'; Ghorbani 44'; Sayyadmanesh 88' | Report | | Stadium: Lokomotiv Stadium |

| 9 September 2023 2024 AFC U-23 ACQ | Hong Kong | 0–10 | Uzbekistan | Tashkent, Uzbekistan |
| 19:00 UTC+5 | | Report | Norchaev 6', 59', 69'; Fayzullaev 25'; Odilov 28'; Rakhmonaliev 57' (pen.); Yip Cheuk Man 74' (o.g.); Khoshimov 83', 88', 90+3' | Stadium: JAR Stadium |

| 12 September 2023 2024 AFC U-23 ACQ | Hong Kong | 0–0 | Afghanistan | Tashkent, Uzbekistan |
| 17:00 UTC+5 | | | | Stadium: Lokomotiv Stadium |

| 22 September 2023 2022 Asian Games GS | Hong Kong | 0–1 | Uzbekistan | Hangzhou, China |
| 19:30 UTC+8 | | Report | Khoshimov 65' | Stadium: Shangcheng Sports Centre Stadium; Attendance: 7,638; Referee: Ngô Duy Lân (Vietnam) |

| 25 September 2023 2022 Asian Games GS | Uzbekistan | 2–1 | Hong Kong | Hangzhou, China |
| 16:00 UTC+8 | Davronov 64'; Jaloliddinov 70' | Report | Li Ngai Hoi 4' | Stadium: Shangcheng Sports Centre Stadium; Attendance: 8,784; Referee: Foo Chuan Hui (Singapore) |

| 27 September 2023 2022 Asian Games R16 | Hong Kong | 1–0 | Palestine | Hangzhou, China |
| 19:30 UTC+8 | Orr 48' | Report | | Stadium: Xiaoshan Sports Centre Stadium; Attendance: 7,219; Referee: Kim Hee-gon (South Korea) |

| 1 October 2023 2022 Asian Games QF | Iran | 0–1 | Hong Kong | Hangzhou, China |
| 19:30 UTC+8 | | Report | Poon Pui Hin 47' | Stadium: Shangcheng Sports Centre Stadium; Attendance: 10,198; Referee: Kim Hee-gon (South Korea) |

| 4 October 2023 2022 Asian Games SF | Hong Kong | 0–4 | Japan | Hangzhou, China |
| 18:00 UTC+8 | | Report | Ayukawa 23'; Hino 54', 86'; Komi 74' | Stadium: Xiaoshan Sports Centre Stadium; Attendance: 7,456; Referee: Qasim Al-Hatmi (Oman) |

| 7 October 2023 2022 Asian Games Bronze medal match | Uzbekistan | 4–0 | Hong Kong | Hangzhou, China |
| 16:00 UTC+8 | Odilov 43'; Norchaev 50', 59'; Davronov 75' | Report | | Stadium: Huanglong Sports Centre Stadium; Attendance: 9,825; Referee: Ngô Duy Lân (Vietnam) |

==== U-20 ====
| 10 August 2023 Friendly | Hong Kong | 0–3 | (England) Man Utd U-16 | Mong Kok, Hong Kong |
| 20:00 UTC+8 | | | | Stadium: Mong Kok Stadium |

| 18 August 2023 2023 East Asian Youth Games | Hong Kong | 3–0 | Macau | Ulaanbaatar, Mongolia |
| 12:30 UTC+8 | Yuen Chun Him 19'; Ng Yu Hei 35'; Chan Yiu Cho 45' | | | Stadium: MFF Football Centre |

| 20 August 2023 2023 East Asian Youth Games | Mongolia | 1–2 | Hong Kong | Ulaanbaatar, Mongolia |
| 17:00 UTC+8 | | | Yuen Chun Him 45+2'; Matthew Slattery 90+3' | Stadium: MFF Football Centre |

| 22 August 2023 2023 East Asian Youth Games | Hong Kong | 0–8 | Chinese Taipei | Ulaanbaatar, Mongolia |
| 12:30 UTC+8 | | | | Stadium: MFF Football Centre |

==== U-15 ====
| 3 August 2023 Friendly | Thailand | 0–3 | Hong Kong | Chonburi, Thailand |
| | | | Yiu Tsz Leong 23'; Gao Ming Ho 55'; Sin Wai Kiu 64' | Stadium: Pattana Studium |

| 5 August 2023 Friendly | Chonburi U-15 (Thailand) | 2–3 | Hong Kong | Chonburi, Thailand |
| | | | | Stadium: Pattana Studium |

| 12 August 2023 Friendly | Hong Kong | 2–3 | (England) Man Utd U-16 | Mong Kok, Hong Kong |
| 17:00 UTC+8 | | | | Stadium: Mong Kok Stadium |

| 1 September 2023 2023 EAFF U-15 Men's Championship GS | Hong Kong | 1–2 | Chinese Taipei | Qingdao, China |
| 15:00 UTC+8 | | Report | | Stadium: Qingdao Baisha Bay Football Centre |

| 3 September 2023 2023 EAFF U-15 Men's Championship GS | Guam | 0–21 | Hong Kong | Qingdao, China |
| 10:00 UTC+8 | | Report | | Stadium: Qingdao Baisha Bay Football Centre |

| 5 September 2023 2023 EAFF U-15 Men's Championship GS | Japan | 10–3 | Hong Kong | Qingdao, China |
| 10:00 UTC+8 | | Report | | Stadium: Qingdao Baisha Bay Football Centre |

| 7 September 2023 2023 EAFF U-15 Men's Championship 5-6th place PO | Mongolia | 2–3 | Hong Kong | Qingdao, China |
| 16:00 UTC+8 | | Report | | Stadium: Qingdao Citizen Fitness Center |

=== Women's ===
==== Senior ====
| 30 November 2024 EAFF E-1 PR | Hong Kong | 0–11 | North Korea | Zhuhai, China |
| 16:00 UTC+8 | | | | Stadium: Suoka Sports Training Base Pitch 2 |

| 2 December 2023 2024 EAFF E-1 PR | Northern Mariana Islands | 1–6 | Hong Kong | Zhuhai, China |
| 10:00 | Chavez 74' | | Anke Leung 25' (pen.), 52'; Chan Wing Sze 36'; Cheung Wai Ki 45', 83'; So Hoi Lam 90+2' | Stadium: Suoka Sports Training Base Pitch 2 |

| 4 December 2023 2024 EAFF E-1 PR | Hong Kong | 6–0 | Mongolia | Zhuhai, China |
| 13:00 | Cheung Wai Ki 5', 49'; Wei Lan 26'; , 31' (o.g.); Chan Wing Sze 48'; Chu Po Yan 67' | | | Stadium: Suoka Sports Training Base Pitch 1 |

| 6 December 2023 2024 EAFF E-1 PR 3rd place | Hong Kong | 1–1 (4–2 p) | Guam | Zhuhai, China |
| | | | | Stadium: Suoka Sports Training Base Pitch 2 |
| | Penalties |
| | Penalty scored | | Penalty missed Penalty scored |

==== U-17 ====
| 6 April 2023 Friendly | Mongolia | 0–8 | Hong Kong | Ulaanbaatar, Mongolia |
| 16:00 UTC+8 | | | | Stadium: MFF Football Centre |

| 8 April 2023 Friendly | Mongolia | 0–9 | Hong Kong | Ulaanbaatar, Mongolia |
| 16:00 UTC+8 | | | | Stadium: MFF Football Centre |

| 28 April 2023 2024 AFC U-17 WACQ R1 | Hong Kong | 3–0 | Tajikistan | Hisor, Tajikistan |
| 18:00 UTC+5 | Wong Hiu Ting 18'; Ko 55', 89' | Report | | Stadium: Hisor Central Stadium; Referee: Tian Jin (China) |

| 30 April 2023 2024 AFC U-17 WACQ R1 | South Korea | 12–0 | Hong Kong | Hisor, Tajikistan |
| 18:00 UTC+5 | Seo Min-jeong 3', 40'; Phair 8', 14', 64'; Lee Ha-eun 18'; Jang Ye-yun 47'; Kwon Da-eun 55', 66', 87'; Beom Ye-ju 58'; Ji Ae 83' | Report | | Stadium: Hisor Central Stadium; Referee: Yang Shu-ting (Chinese Taipei) |

== Club competitions ==
=== League (men) ===
==== Promotion and relegation ====
| League | Promoted to league | Relegated from league |
|---|---|---|
| Hong Kong Premier League | North District | N/A |
| Hong Kong First Division League | 3 Sing; Sai Kung | Kwai Tsing; Leaper MG |
| Hong Kong Second Division League | WSE; Sun Hei | Double Flower; St. Joseph's |
| Hong Kong Third Division League | | Lung Moon |

==== Hong Kong Premier League ====
| Pos | Team | Pld | W | D | L | GF | GA | GD | Pts | Qualification or relegation |
|---|---|---|---|---|---|---|---|---|---|---|
| 1 | Kitchee (C) | 18 | 15 | 1 | 2 | 76 | 7 | +69 | 46 | Qualification for AFC Champions League group stage |
| 2 | Lee Man | 18 | 14 | 2 | 2 | 50 | 13 | +37 | 44 | Qualification for AFC Champions League qualifying play-offs (Note: Since the winners of the 2022–23 Hong Kong FA Cup, Kitchee, qualified for the Champions League group stage, the Champions League qualifying play-offs berth given to the Hong Kong FA Cup winners was passed to the third-placed team.) |
| 3 | Rangers | 18 | 10 | 3 | 5 | 41 | 16 | +25 | 33 | Qualification for AFC Champions League qualifying play-offs |
| 4 | Eastern | 18 | 9 | 4 | 5 | 32 | 13 | +19 | 31 (Note: Head-to-head points: Eastern 3, Southern 3. Head-to-head goals: Eastern 2, Southern 2 Goal differences: Eastern +19, Southern -1.) | |
| 5 | Southern | 18 | 10 | 1 | 7 | 24 | 25 | −1 | 31 | |
| 6 | HKFC | 18 | 7 | 5 | 6 | 18 | 22 | −4 | 26 | |
| 7 | Tai Po | 18 | 5 | 5 | 8 | 20 | 27 | −7 | 20 | |
| 8 | Resources Capital | 18 | 5 | 3 | 10 | 15 | 34 | −19 | 18 | |
| 9 | Sham Shui Po | 18 | 2 | 1 | 15 | 4 | 62 | −58 | 7 | |
| 10 | HK U23 | 18 | 0 | 1 | 17 | 6 | 67 | −61 | 1 | |

Updated to match(es) played on unknown. Source: Hong Kong Football Association
Rules for classification: 1) Points; 2) Head-to-head points; 3) Head-to-head goal difference; 4) Head-to-head goals scored; 5) Goal difference; 6) Goals scored; 7) Fair-play points; 8) Drawing lots (Play-off if the winner has to be decided).
(C) Champions

==== Hong Kong First Division League ====
| Pos | Team | Pld | W | D | L | GF | GA | GD | Pts | Promotion or relegation |
|---|---|---|---|---|---|---|---|---|---|---|
| 1 | Central & Western (C) | 26 | 21 | 4 | 1 | 79 | 21 | +58 | 67 | |
| 2 | Kowloon City | 26 | 17 | 6 | 3 | 67 | 28 | +39 | 57 | |
| 3 | North District (P) | 26 | 14 | 4 | 8 | 50 | 27 | +23 | 46 | Promotion to the Premier League |
| 4 | South China | 26 | 12 | 7 | 7 | 62 | 31 | +31 | 43 | |
| 5 | Sha Tin | 26 | 14 | 0 | 12 | 50 | 48 | +2 | 42 | |
| 6 | Yuen Long | 26 | 11 | 8 | 7 | 42 | 35 | +7 | 41 (Note: Head-to-head points: Yuen Long 4, Wing Yee 1.) | |
| 7 | Wing Yee | 26 | 11 | 8 | 7 | 48 | 29 | +19 | 41 | |
| 8 | Hoi King | 26 | 10 | 8 | 8 | 58 | 42 | +16 | 38 | |
| 9 | Eastern District | 26 | 9 | 4 | 13 | 47 | 59 | −12 | 31 | |
| 10 | Citizen | 26 | 8 | 6 | 12 | 44 | 43 | +1 | 30 | |
| 11 | Happy Valley (W) | 26 | 8 | 5 | 13 | 47 | 84 | −37 | 29 | Withdrew from league system |
| 12 | Wong Tai Sin | 26 | 5 | 5 | 16 | 30 | 59 | −29 | 20 | |
| 13 | Leaper MG (R) | 26 | 3 | 3 | 20 | 25 | 70 | −45 | 12 | Relegation to the Second Division |
| 14 | Kwai Tsing (R) | 26 | 3 | 2 | 21 | 27 | 106 | −79 | 11 | Relegation to the Second Division |

Updated to match(es) played on 28 May 2023. Source: Hong Kong Football Association
Rules for classification: 1) Points; 2) Head-to-head points; 3) Head-to-head goal difference; 4) Head-to-head goals scored; 5) Goal difference; 6) Goals scored; 7) Fair-play points; 8) Drawing lots
(C) Champions; (P) Promoted; (R) Relegated; (W) Withdrew

==== Hong Kong Second Division League ====
| Pos | Team | Pld | W | D | L | GF | GA | GD | Pts | Promotion or relegation |
|---|---|---|---|---|---|---|---|---|---|---|
| 1 | 3 Sing (C, P) | 30 | 28 | 2 | 0 | 116 | 17 | +99 | 86 | Promotion to the First Division |
| 2 | Sai Kung (P) | 30 | 22 | 2 | 6 | 86 | 35 | +51 | 68 | Promotion to the First Division |
| 3 | Wing Go | 30 | 18 | 4 | 8 | 78 | 52 | +26 | 58 | |
| 4 | Kowloon Cricket Club | 30 | 17 | 4 | 9 | 63 | 42 | +21 | 55 | |
| 5 | Yau Tsim Mong | 30 | 15 | 8 | 7 | 64 | 43 | +21 | 53 | |
| 6 | Mutual | 30 | 16 | 3 | 11 | 68 | 58 | +10 | 51 | |
| 7 | Lucky Mile | 30 | 15 | 6 | 9 | 59 | 37 | +22 | 51 | |
| 8 | CFCSSHK | 30 | 11 | 6 | 13 | 53 | 52 | +1 | 39 | |
| 9 | Kwun Tong | 30 | 11 | 4 | 15 | 35 | 40 | −5 | 37 | |
| 10 | Kwong Wah | 30 | 11 | 4 | 15 | 39 | 59 | −20 | 37 | |
| 11 | Wan Chai | 30 | 9 | 6 | 15 | 48 | 52 | −4 | 33 | |
| 12 | Tuen Mun | 30 | 8 | 8 | 14 | 41 | 57 | −16 | 32 (Note: Tuen Mun is ahead on goal difference.) | |
| 13 | Fu Moon | 30 | 9 | 5 | 16 | 37 | 69 | −32 | 32 | |
| 14 | Tung Sing | 30 | 10 | 1 | 19 | 48 | 82 | −34 | 31 | |
| 15 | Double Flower (R) | 30 | 4 | 3 | 23 | 30 | 87 | −57 | 15 | Relegation to the Third Division |
| 16 | St. Joseph's (R) | 30 | 1 | 4 | 25 | 24 | 107 | −83 | 7 | Relegation to the Third Division |

Updated to match(es) played on 25 June 2023. Source: Hong Kong Football Association
Rules for classification: 1) Points; 2) Head-to-head points; 3) Head-to-head goal difference; 4) Head-to-head goals scored; 5) Goal difference; 6) Goals scored; 7) Fair-play points; 8) Drawing lots
(C) Champions; (P) Promoted; (R) Relegated

==== Hong Kong Third Division League ====
| Pos | Team | Pld | W | D | L | GF | GA | GD | Pts | Promotion or relegation |
|---|---|---|---|---|---|---|---|---|---|---|
| 1 | WSE (C, P) | 28 | 21 | 7 | 0 | 74 | 16 | +58 | 70 | Promotion to Second Division |
| 2 | Sun Hei (P) | 28 | 18 | 6 | 4 | 70 | 24 | +46 | 60 | Promotion to Second Division |
| 3 | Fukien | 28 | 17 | 7 | 4 | 57 | 29 | +28 | 58 | |
| 4 | Tsun Tat | 28 | 16 | 5 | 7 | 64 | 43 | +21 | 53 | |
| 5 | Islands | 28 | 13 | 9 | 6 | 43 | 33 | +10 | 48 | |
| 6 | Gospel | 28 | 10 | 7 | 11 | 42 | 46 | −4 | 37 | |
| 7 | City | 28 | 10 | 4 | 14 | 42 | 49 | −7 | 34 | |
| 8 | Pegasus | 28 | 10 | 4 | 14 | 41 | 54 | −13 | 34 | |
| 9 | Tsuen Wan | 28 | 9 | 6 | 13 | 40 | 46 | −6 | 33 | |
| 10 | KCDRSC | 28 | 8 | 7 | 13 | 42 | 49 | −7 | 31 | |
| 11 | Lansbury | 28 | 8 | 7 | 13 | 36 | 56 | −20 | 31 | |
| 12 | Ornament | 28 | 7 | 7 | 14 | 51 | 74 | −23 | 28 | |
| 13 | Tuen Mun FC | 28 | 7 | 5 | 16 | 26 | 50 | −24 | 26 | |
| 14 | Kui Tan | 28 | 7 | 3 | 18 | 28 | 62 | −34 | 24 | |
| 15 | Lung Moon (E) | 28 | 2 | 10 | 16 | 18 | 43 | −25 | 16 | Elimination from League System |

Updated to match(es) played on 2 July 2023. Source: Hong Kong Football Association
(C) Champions; (E) Eliminated; (P) Promoted

=== First round ===
| 11 September 2022 | Tai Po | 1–2 | Rangers | Mong Kok Stadium |
| 15:00 UTC+8 | Cividini 90' | Report | Fernando 67'; Juninho 84' | Attendance: 1,202; Referee: Yu Kin Fung |

| 12 September 2022 | HKFC | 0–5 | Kitchee | Mong Kok Stadium |
| 15:00 UTC+8 | | Report | Scott 51'; Mikael 52'; Mingazov 79', 81'; Roberto 87' | Attendance: 1,505; Referee: Tam Ping Wun |

=== Quarter-finals ===
| 22 October 2022 | Southern | 1–4 (a.e.t.) | Kitchee | Mong Kok Stadium |
| 15:00 UTC+8 | Awal 78' | Report | Damjanović 90+6', 96', 120+1'; Mingazow 105' | Attendance: 1,542; Referee: Luk Kin Sun |

| 22 October 2022 | Lee Man | 5–0 | Sham Shui Po | Tseung Kwan O Sports Ground |
| 18:00 UTC+8 | Cheng Siu Kwan 23'; Gavilán 45+2', 52'; Everton 57', 81' | Report | | Attendance: 355; Referee: Lau Fong Hei |

| 23 October 2022 | Resources Capital | 1–3 | Eastern | Tai Po Sports Ground |
| 15:00 UTC+8 | Sá 57' | Report | Bertomeu 2'; Estevez 17'; Sun Ming Him 53' | Attendance: 420; Referee: Tam Ping Wun |

| 23 October 2022 | HK U23 | 0–2 | Rangers | Tseung Kwan O Sports Ground |
| 18:00 UTC+8 | | Report | Kilama 7'; Juninho 63' | Attendance: 263; Referee: Liu Kwok Man |

=== Semi-finals ===
| 25 December 2022 | Kitchee | 4–0 | Lee Man | Mong Kok Stadium |
| 15:00 UTC+8 | Cleiton 17', 24'; Mikael 80'; Damjanović 90+4' | Report | | Attendance: 2,982; Referee: Luk Kin Sun |

| 26 December 2022 | Rangers | 0–1 | Eastern | Mong Kok Stadium |
| 15:00 UTC+8 | | Report | Bertomeu 47' | Attendance: 1,663; Referee: Yu Kin Fung |

=== Final ===
| 22 January 2023 | Eastern | 1–1 (a.e.t.) (2–4 p) | Kitchee | Hong Kong Stadium |
| 16:00 UTC+8 | Bertomeu 78' | Report | Mikael 71' | Attendance: 7,192; Referee: Lau Fong Hei |
| | Penalties |
| | Gondra (penalty scored); Sun Ming Him (penalty missed); Wong Tsz Ho (penalty missed); Leung Kwun Chung (penalty scored) | | (penalty scored) Sartori; (penalty scored) Damjanović; (penalty scored) Scott; (penalty scored) Gerbig |

==== Hong Kong FA Cup ====
Times are in Hong Kong Time (UTC+08:00).

=== First round ===
| 2 October 2022 | Resources Capital | 1–2 (a.e.t.) | HKFC | Mong Kok |
| 15:00 | Harima 87' | Report | Merkies 35'; McMillan 116' | Stadium: Mong Kok Stadium; Attendance: 766; Referee: Yu Kin Fung |

| 8 October 2022 | Southern | 6–1 | HK U23 | Mong Kok |
| 18:00 | Lee Ka Yiu 23'; Chan Yun Tung 34' (o.g.); Awal 53', 73'; Sasaki 62' (pen.), 85' | Report | Law Hiu Chung 41' | Stadium: Mong Kok Stadium; Attendance: 427; Referee: Liu Kwok Man |

=== Quarter-finals ===
| 3 December 2022 | Kitchee | 4–1 | Sham Shui Po | Mong Kok |
| 18:00 | Damjanović 42'; Poon Pui Hin 47'; Fernando 70'; Cleiton 90+4' | Report | Lai Kak Yi 52' | Stadium: Mong Kok Stadium; Attendance: 497; Referee: Luk Kin Sun |

| 10 December 2022 | Lee Man | 0–2 | Southern | Tsing Yi |
| 18:00 | | Report | Pereira 53'; Awal 65' | Stadium: Tsing Yi Sports Ground; Attendance: 431; Referee: Yu Kin Fung |

| 17 December 2022 | Rangers | 1–0 | Tai Po | Tsing Yi |
| 15:00 | Juninho 24' | Report | | Stadium: Tsing Yi Sports Ground; Attendance: 298; Referee: Liu Kwok Man |

| 7 January 2023 | Eastern | 3–0 | HKFC | Mong Kok |
| 18:00 | Sun Ming Him 12'; Kozubayev 41'; Wu Chun Ming 62' | Report | | Stadium: Mong Kok Stadium; Attendance: 644; Referee: Wong Wai Lun |

=== Semi-finals ===
| 29 April 2023 | Southern | 1–2 | Rangers | Mong Kok |
| 15:00 | Pereira 55' | Report | Kim Min-kyu 66'; Juninho 87' (pen.) | Stadium: Mong Kok Stadium; Attendance: 1,251; Referee: Liu Kwok Man |

| 1 May 2023 | Eastern | 1–2 (a.e.t.) | Kitchee | Mong Kok |
| 15:00 | Bertomeu 14' (pen.) | Report | Alex 67'; Mikael 116' (pen.) | Stadium: Mong Kok Stadium; Attendance: 2,780; Referee: Luk Kin Sun |

=== Final ===
| 13 May 2023 | Rangers | 1–7 | Kitchee | Mong Kok |
| 15:00 UTC+8 | Park Jong-bum 42' | Report | Scott 30', 60'; Cleiton 39', 72', 76'; Poon Pui Hin 45+2'; Mikael 58' | Stadium: Mong Kok Stadium; Attendance: 3,083; Referee: Liu Kwok Man |

==== Hong Kong Sapling Cup ====
| Pos | Team | Pld | W | D | L | GF | GA | GD | Pts | Qualification |
|---|---|---|---|---|---|---|---|---|---|---|
| 1 | Southern | 8 | 6 | 1 | 1 | 25 | 8 | +17 | 19 | Advance to Semi-finals |
| 2 | Lee Man | 8 | 5 | 2 | 1 | 18 | 10 | +8 | 17 | Advance to Semi-finals |
| 3 | Tai Po | 8 | 3 | 0 | 5 | 14 | 14 | 0 | 9 | |
| 4 | HKFC | 8 | 2 | 1 | 5 | 14 | 18 | −4 | 7 | |
| 5 | Sham Shui Po | 8 | 1 | 2 | 5 | 6 | 27 | −21 | 5 | |

Source: Hong Kong Football Association
Rules for classification: 1) Points; 2) Head-to-head points; 3) Head-to-head goal difference; 4) Goal difference; 5) Goals scored.

| Pos | Team | Pld | W | D | L | GF | GA | GD | Pts | Qualification |
|---|---|---|---|---|---|---|---|---|---|---|
| 1 | Eastern | 8 | 5 | 2 | 1 | 16 | 8 | +8 | 17 (Note: Head-to-head points: Eastern 4, Rangers 1) | Advance to Semi-finals |
| 2 | Rangers | 8 | 5 | 2 | 1 | 14 | 9 | +5 | 17 | Advance to Semi-finals |
| 3 | Kitchee | 8 | 5 | 1 | 2 | 24 | 7 | +17 | 16 | |
| 4 | HK U23 | 8 | 1 | 1 | 6 | 4 | 14 | −10 | 4 | |
| 5 | Resources Capital | 8 | 0 | 2 | 6 | 9 | 29 | −20 | 2 | |

Source: Hong Kong Football Association
Rules for classification: 1) Points; 2) Head-to-head points; 3) Head-to-head goal difference; 4) Goal difference; 5) Goals scored.

=== Semi-finals ===
| 19 April 2023 SF | Southern | 2–2 (6–5 p) | Rangers | Mong Kok, Kowloon |
| 20:00 | Sasaki 56' (pen.); Moser 76' | Report | Juninho 50'; Park Jong-bum 61' | Stadium: Mong Kok Stadium; Attendance: 985; Referee: Tam Ping Wun |
| | Penalties |
| | Pereira (penalty scored); Kessi (penalty scored); Sasaki (penalty missed); Chen Ngo Hin (penalty scored); Kawase (penalty scored); Khan (penalty missed); Lau Hok Ming (penalty scored); Buddle (penalty scored) | | (penalty scored) Lo Kwan Yee; (penalty missed) Kim Min-kyu; (penalty scored) Juninho; (penalty scored) Lam Ka Wai; (penalty scored) Ibrahim; (penalty missed) Yu Joy Yin; (penalty scored) Kilama; (penalty missed) Lui Cheuk Kan |

| 20 April 2023 SF | Eastern | 0–1 | Lee Man | Mong Kok, Kowloon |
| 20:00 | | Report | Sesay 90' | Stadium: Mong Kok Stadium; Attendance: 1,575; Referee: Luk Kin Sun |

=== Final ===
| 20 May 2023 F | Southern | 2–0 | Lee Man | Mong Kok, Kowloon |
| 15:00 UTC+8 | Pereira 55', 80' | Report | | Stadium: Mong Kok Stadium; Attendance: 2,519; Referee: Ho Wai Sing |

== See also ==
- Hong Kong Football Association
- Hong Kong national football team
- Hong Kong women's national football team
- Hong Kong national under-23 football team
- Hong Kong national under-20 football team
- Hong Kong national under-17 football team
