= 2027 AFC U-20 Asian Cup qualification =

Tournament details
- Host countries: Qualification phase Kyrgyzstan (Group A); Uzbekistan (Group B); Vietnam (Group C); Bahrain (Group D); Qatar (Group E); Thailand (Group F); Cambodia (Group G); Laos (Group H); Development phase Mongolia (Group I); Bhutan (Group J); Myanmar (Group K)
- Dates: 31 August – 6 September 2026
- Teams: 44 (from 1 confederation)
- Venues: 12 (in 11 host cities)

Tournament statistics
- Matches played: 60
- Goals scored: 200 (3.33 per match)
- Top scorer(s): Qualification phase (Japan) Homare Tokuda (5 goals); Development phase (Bhutan) Rinzin Dorji (Myanmar) Kaung Khant Kyaw (4 goals each)

The 2027 AFC U-20 Asian Cup qualification was an international men's under-20 football competition organized by the Asian Football Confederation (AFC). The tournament was held from 31 August to 6 September 2026 to determine the participating teams for the 2027 AFC U-20 Asian Cup.

== Format ==
In January 2026, the AFC introduced a new two-phase format for the AFC U-20 Asian Cup qualifiers, featuring a qualification phase and a development phase with promotion and relegation. Teams were allocated into each phase based on a ranking derived from the results of the three most recent editions of the tournament (2018, 2023 and 2025). In each phase, teams are drawn into groups to play a single round-robin format at centralised venues:

- Qualification phase: Thirty-two teams are divided into eight groups of four. The winners of each group, and the seven best runners-up, qualify for the final tournament. The six lowest ranked fourth-placed teams across all groups are relegated to the development phase for the subsequent edition of the qualifiers.
- Development phase: Twelve teams are divided into three groups of four. The top two teams in each group are promoted to the qualification phase for the subsequent edition of the qualifiers.

== Draw ==
The draw took place on 28 May 2026 at the AFC House in Kuala Lumpur, Malaysia.

Teams are seeded based on the results of the three most recent editions of the tournament (2018, 2023 and 2025). The teams hosting the qualification groups are also allocated to an additional "Hosts Pot", to ensure they are drawn into different groups. Final tournament hosts China will not participate in the qualifiers.

Qualification phase
Pot 1	Pot 2	Pot 3	Pot 4
1. Australia; 2. **South Korea**; 3. **Japan**; 4. **Saudi Arabia**; 5. **Uzbekistan** **(H)**; 6. **Iraq**; 7. **Iran**; 8. **Jordan**	9. Qatar **(H)**; 10. **Indonesia**; 11. Syria; 12. **Thailand** **(H)**; 13. Vietnam **(H)**; 14. Yemen; 15. Kyrgyzstan **(H)**; 16. **Tajikistan**	17. **Oman**; 18. United Arab Emirates; 19. **India**; 20. **North Korea**; 21. Cambodia **(H)**; 22. Bahrain **(H)**; 23. **Malaysia**; 24. Philippines **(W)**	25. Bangladesh; 26. Turkmenistan; 27. Kuwait; 28. **Lebanon**; 29. Palestine; 30. Laos **(H)**; 31. Hong Kong; 32. Afghanistan

Development phase
Pot 1	Pot 2	Pot 3	Pot 4
1. Chinese Taipei; 2. Mongolia **(H)**; 3. Myanmar **(H)**	4. Singapore; 5. Guam; 6. Maldives	7. Nepal **(W)**; 8. Brunei; 9. Bhutan **(H)**	10. Macau; 11. Sri Lanka; 12. Northern Mariana Islands

Did not enter
- Pakistan
- Timor-Leste

Notes

- (H): Qualification group hosts
- (W): Withdrew after the draw
- Teams in **Bold** qualified for the final tournament

== Schedule ==
Round	Date
Matchday 1	31 August 2026
Matchday 2	3 September 2026
Matchday 3	6 September 2026

== Qualification phase ==
The eight group winners and the seven best runners-up qualify for the final tournament.

Tie-breaking criteria
Teams were ranked according to points (3 points for a win, 1 point for a draw, 0 points for a loss), and if tied on points, the following tiebreaking criteria are applied, in the order given, to determine the rankings:
1. Points in head-to-head matches among tied teams;
2. Goal difference in head-to-head matches among tied teams;
3. Goals scored in head-to-head matches among tied teams;
4. If more than two teams are tied, and after applying all head-to-head criteria above, a subset of teams are still tied, all head-to-head criteria above are reapplied exclusively to this subset of teams;
5. Goal difference in all group matches;
6. Goals scored in all group matches;
7. Penalty shoot-out if only two teams are tied and they met in the last round of the group;
8. Disciplinary points (yellow card = 1 point, red card as a result of two yellow cards = 3 points, direct red card = 3 points, yellow card followed by direct red card = 4 points);
9. Drawing of lots.

=== Group A ===
- All matches were held in Kyrgyzstan.
- Times listed are UTC+6.

Pos	Team	Pld	W	D	L	GF	GA	GD	Pts	Qualification or relegation
1	South Korea	2	1	1	0	3	2	+1	4	Qualified for the final tournament
2	Lebanon	2	1	0	1	5	5	0	3	Qualified for the final tournament
3	Kyrgyzstan (H)	2	0	1	1	2	3	−1	1	
4	Philippines	0	0	0	0	0	0	0	0	Withdrew and relegation to development phase

Source: AFC
Rules for classification: Qualification tiebreakers
(H) Hosts
31 August 2026
16:00

Lebanon	2–3	South Korea
Kazan 36'; Saad 88'	Report	Kwon Jun-seong 40'; Kim Min-woo 45+4'; Lee Ho-jin 60'

Dolen Omurzakov Stadium, Bishkek
Referee: Ahmed Khalil (Bahrain)

3 September 2026
20:00

Kyrgyzstan	2–3	Lebanon
Akylbekovich 45+1'; Bondarenko 90+5'	Report	Nicolas 5'; Makhmudzhanov 36' (o.g.); Bassil 90+8' (pen.)

Dolen Omurzakov Stadium, Bishkek
Referee: Ahmed Kadhim Gatea (Iraq)

6 September 2026
20:00

South Korea	0–0	Kyrgyzstan
	Report

Dolen Omurzakov Stadium, Bishkek
Referee: Bijan Heydari (Iran)

=== Group B ===
- All matches were held in Uzbekistan.
- Times listed are UTC+5.

Pos	Team	Pld	W	D	L	GF	GA	GD	Pts	Qualification or relegation
1	Uzbekistan (H)	3	3	0	0	9	0	+9	9	Qualified for the final tournament
2	India	3	2	0	1	4	4	0	6	Qualified for the final tournament
3	Syria	3	1	0	2	3	4	−1	3	
4	Bangladesh	3	0	0	3	0	8	−8	0	Relegation to development phase

Source: AFC
Rules for classification: Qualification tiebreakers
(H) Hosts
31 August 2026
16:00

Syria	0–1	India
	Report	Singamayum 86'

Do'stlik Stadium, Tashkent
Referee: Du Jianxin (China)
31 August 2026
19:00

Uzbekistan	2–0	Bangladesh
Saydaliev 19'; Kuvonchbek 46'	Report

Do'stlik Stadium, Tashkent
Referee: Wiwat Jumpaoon (Thailand)

3 September 2026
16:00

Bangladesh	0–3	Syria
	Report	Alam 44'; Marios 45+1'; Al Najar 90'

Do'stlik Stadium, Tashkent
Referee: Ammar Ashkanani (Kuwait)
3 September 2026
19:00

India	0–4	Uzbekistan
	Report	Maratov 29'; Kuvonchbek 34'; Shorakhmedov 67'; Sersenbaev 90'

Do'stlik Stadium, Tashkent
Referee: Morteza Mansourian (Iran)

6 September 2026
16:00

India	3–0	Bangladesh
Laishram 25'; Yadav 60'; Arbash 79'	Report

Do'stlik Stadium, Tashkent
Referee: Yudi Nurcahya (Indonesia)
6 September 2026
19:00

Uzbekistan	3–0	Syria
Ermanov 10'; Kuvonchbek 81'; Tulaganov 90+5' (pen.)	Report

Do'stlik Stadium, Tashkent
Referee: Du Jianxin (China)

=== Group C ===
- All matches will be held in Vietnam.
- Times listed are UTC+7.

Pos	Team	Pld	W	D	L	GF	GA	GD	Pts	Qualification or relegation
1	North Korea	3	3	0	0	9	1	+8	9	Qualified for the final tournament
2	Iran	3	2	0	1	6	4	+2	6	Qualified for the final tournament
3	Palestine	3	1	0	2	3	7	−4	3	
4	Vietnam (H)	3	0	0	3	2	8	−6	0	Relegation to development phase

Source: AFC
Rules for classification: Qualification tiebreakers
(H) Hosts
31 August 2026
16:00

Iran	2–1	Palestine
Chesmberah 51'; Khodadadian 71'	Report	Abou-Chaker 90+1'

Việt Trì Stadium, Phú Thọ
Referee: Mongkolchai Pechsri (Thailand)
31 August 2026
19:00

Vietnam	0–3	North Korea
	Report	Kim Yu-jin 46', 58'; Ri Hyok-gwang 50'

Việt Trì Stadium, Phú Thọ
Referee: Ismaeel Habib Ali (Bahrain)

3 September 2026
16:00

North Korea	2–1	Iran
Kang Wi-song 90+2'; Kang Myong-bom 90+4'	Report	Jannianavaei 47'

Việt Trì Stadium, Phú Thọ
Referee: Abdullo Davlatov (Tajikistan)
3 September 2026
19:00

Palestine	2–1	Vietnam
Tayem 34'; Hamade 82'	Report	Nguyễn Quốc Khánh 66'

Việt Trì Stadium, Phú Thọ
Referee: Sami Al-Ismail (Saudi Arabia)

6 September 2026
16:00

North Korea	4–0	Palestine
Kim Yu-jin 50'; An Jin-sok 54'; Pak Kwang-song 56'; Ho Myong-ryong 90'	Report

Việt Trì Stadium, Phú Thọ
Referee: Ismaeel Habib Ali (Bahrain)
6 September 2026
19:00

Iran	3–1	Vietnam
Arian 50'; Beheshti 63' (pen.); Zadeh 90+5' (pen.)	Report	Nguyễn Quốc Khánh 41'

Việt Trì Stadium, Phú Thọ
Referee: Harish Kundu (India)

=== Group D ===
- All matches were held in Bahrain.
- Times listed are UTC+3.

Pos	Team	Pld	W	D	L	GF	GA	GD	Pts	Qualification or relegation
1	Tajikistan	3	2	0	1	7	4	+3	6	Qualified for the final tournament
2	Jordan	3	2	0	1	3	2	+1	6	Qualified for the final tournament
3	Afghanistan	3	1	0	2	4	6	−2	3	
4	Bahrain (H)	3	1	0	2	5	7	−2	3	

Source: AFC
Rules for classification: Qualification tiebreakers
(H) Hosts
31 August 2026
17:00

Jordan	1–0	Afghanistan
Ramadan 41'	Report

Khalifa Sports City Stadium, Isa Town
Referee: Said Al-Mezeini (Oman)
31 August 2026
20:30

Tajikistan	2–3	Bahrain
Murotov 14'; Ahmed 90+1' (o.g.)	Report	Mahran 6', 44', 90'

Khalifa Sports City Stadium, Isa Town
Referee: Ali Al Ashkar (Lebanon)

3 September 2026
17:00

Afghanistan	1–4	Tajikistan
Hotak 30'	Report	Sharopov 19'; Kamolov 22'; Odilzoda 37'; Makhtomov 88'

Khalifa Sports City Stadium, Isa Town
Referee: Amir Arab Baraghi (Iran)
3 September 2026
20:30

Bahrain	1–2	Jordan
Al Asam 76'	Report	Al-Dajani 58'; Abu Zaid 90+4'

Khalifa Sports City Stadium, Isa Town
Referee: Clifford Daypuyat (Philippines)

6 September 2026
17:00

Jordan	0–1	Tajikistan
	Report	Isakov 55'

Khalifa Sports City Stadium, Isa Town
Referee: Zhang Lei (China)
6 September 2026
20:30

Bahrain	1–3	Afghanistan
Ebrahim 59'	Report	Hotak 6'; Safi 70'; Farzad 84'

Khalifa Sports City Stadium, Isa Town
Referee: Ali Al Ashkar (Lebanon)

=== Group E ===
- All matches were held in Qatar.
- Times listed are UTC+3.

Pos	Team	Pld	W	D	L	GF	GA	GD	Pts	Qualification or relegation
1	Saudi Arabia	3	3	0	0	6	2	+4	9	Qualified for the final tournament
2	Oman	3	1	1	1	5	5	0	4	Qualified for the final tournament
3	Qatar (H)	3	1	0	2	4	3	+1	3	
4	Hong Kong	3	0	1	2	1	6	−5	1	Relegation to development phase

Source: AFC
Rules for classification: Qualification tiebreakers
(H) Hosts
31 August 2026
19:00

Saudi Arabia	2–0	Hong Kong
Suhayb 26'; Al Obeidi 45+1' (pen.)	Report

Hamad bin Khalifa Stadium, Doha
Referee: Ammar Abo Alo (Syria)
31 August 2026
19:00

Qatar	1–2	Oman
Jamil 26'	Report	Al Alawi 64', 73'

Abdullah bin Khalifa Stadium, Doha
Referee: Koki Nagamine (Japan)

3 September 2026
19:00

Oman	2–3	Saudi Arabia
Al Qassmi 23'; Al Samin 69'	Report	Abdullah 18' (o.g.); Abu Bakr 47'; Yousef 66'

Hamad bin Khalifa Stadium, Doha
Referee: Ben Abraham (Australia)
3 September 2026
19:00

Hong Kong	0–3	Qatar
	Report	Al Sayed 10'; Ali 17'; Mohamed 45+1'

Abdullah bin Khalifa Stadium, Doha
Referee: Ngô Duy Lân (Vietnam)

6 September 2026
19:00

Oman	1–1	Hong Kong
Al Alawi 84'	Report	Cheung Yiu Hin 58'

Hamad bin Khalifa Stadium, Doha
Referee: Seyed Vahid Kazemi (Iran)
6 September 2026
19:00

Saudi Arabia	1–0	Qatar
Ibrahim 81'	Report

Abdullah bin Khalifa Stadium, Doha
Referee: Koki Nagamine (Japan)

=== Group F ===
- All matches were held in Thailand.
- Times listed are UTC+7.

Pos	Team	Pld	W	D	L	GF	GA	GD	Pts	Qualification or relegation
1	Iraq	3	2	0	1	6	4	+2	6	Qualified for the final tournament
2	Thailand (H)	3	2	0	1	3	3	0	6	Qualified for the final tournament
3	United Arab Emirates	3	1	0	2	4	5	−1	3	
4	Turkmenistan	3	1	0	2	4	5	−1	3	

Source: AFC
Rules for classification: Qualification tiebreakers
(H) Hosts
31 August 2026
15:30

Iraq	1–2	Turkmenistan
Malik 59'	Report	Gowşudow 15'; Orazdurdyýew 77'

Chonburi Stadium, Chonburi
Referee: Ahmad Alaeddin (Lebanon)
31 August 2026
19:30

Thailand	1–0	United Arab Emirates
Siwakorn 45+1'	Report

Chonburi Stadium, Chonburi
Referee: Feras Taweel (Syria)

3 September 2026
15:30

United Arab Emirates	1–2	Iraq
Muller 15'	Report	Malik 45'; Al Zeyadi 68'

Chonburi Stadium, Chonburi
Referee: Akhrol Riskullaev (Uzbekistan)
3 September 2026
19:30

Turkmenistan	0–1	Thailand
	Report	Siwa 57'

Chonburi Stadium, Chonburi
Referee: Aditya Purkayastha (India)

6 September 2026
15:30

United Arab Emirates	3–2	Turkmenistan
Muller 62', 81'; Al Jneibi 84'	Report	Gowşudow 8'; Charryev 19'

Chonburi Stadium, Chonburi
Referee: Sanzhar Zhakypbekov (Kyrgyzstan)
6 September 2026
19:30

Iraq	3–1	Thailand
Malik 10', 45'; Hasan 19'	Report	Chantawat 86'

Chonburi Stadium, Chonburi
Referee: Ahmad Alaeddin (Lebanon)

=== Group G ===
- All matches were held in Cambodia.
- Times listed are UTC+7.

Pos	Team	Pld	W	D	L	GF	GA	GD	Pts	Qualification or relegation
1	Japan	3	3	0	0	16	0	+16	9	Qualified for the final tournament
2	Kuwait	3	1	0	2	6	7	−1	3 (Note: Head-to-head goal differences: Kuwait +3, Yemen +1, Cambodia –4.)	
3	Yemen	3	1	0	2	4	7	−3	3	
4	Cambodia (H)	3	1	0	2	2	14	−12	3	Relegation to development phase

Source: AFC
Rules for classification: Qualification tiebreakers
(H) Hosts
Notes:
31 August 2026
16:00

Japan	4–0	Kuwait
Fuji 15'; Hamasaki 35' (pen.); Tokuda 40', 42'	Report

Olympic Stadium, Phnom Penh
Referee: Resul Mämmedow (Turkmenistan)
31 August 2026
19:00

Yemen	1–2	Cambodia
Mokhtar 24'	Report	Menghong 15'; David 56' (pen.)

Olympic Stadium, Phnom Penh
Referee: Mohamad Issa (Lebanon)

3 September 2026
16:00

Kuwait	1–3	Yemen
Al-Adwani 69'	Report	Saleh 24', 71'; Zaid 85'

Olympic Stadium, Phnom Penh
Referee: Akobirxuja Shukurullaev (Uzbekistan)
3 September 2026
19:00

Cambodia	0–8	Japan
	Report	Schmidt 26'; Tokuda 44'; Kidera 68'; Tokumura 74'; Fujita 78'; Vattana 80' (o.g.); Osa 89'; Phan 90+3' (o.g.)

Olympic Stadium, Phnom Penh
Referee: Hasan Akrami (Iran)

6 September 2026
16:00

Japan	4–0	Yemen
Tokuda 10', 30'; Asada 27'; Tokumura 87'	Report

Olympic Stadium, Phnom Penh
Referee: Resul Mämmedow (Turkmenistan)
6 September 2026
19:00

Cambodia	0–5	Kuwait
	Report	Allanqawi 12'; Al-Azemi 26'; Al-Adwani 40', 64'; Al-Qarzaei 55' (pen.)

Olympic Stadium, Phnom Penh
Referee: Yousif Saeed Hasan (Iraq)

=== Group H ===
- All matches were held in Laos.
- Times listed are UTC+7.

Pos	Team	Pld	W	D	L	GF	GA	GD	Pts	Qualification or relegation
1	Indonesia	3	2	1	0	5	0	+5	7	Qualified for the final tournament
2	Malaysia	3	1	2	0	4	3	+1	5	Qualified for the final tournament
3	Australia	3	1	1	1	4	4	0	4	
4	Laos (H)	3	0	0	3	1	7	−6	0	Relegation to development phase

Source: AFC
Rules for classification: Qualification tiebreakers
(H) Hosts
31 August 2026
16:00

Indonesia	0–0	Malaysia
	Report

New Laos National Stadium, Vientiane
Referee: Mohamed Khaled (Bahrain)
31 August 2026
19:00

Australia	2–0	Laos
Neill 13' (pen.); Marinucci 49'	Report

New Laos National Stadium, Vientiane
Referee: Omar Al-Yaqoubi (Oman)

3 September 2026
16:00

Malaysia	2–2	Australia
Fadhlul Hadi 50'; Izzuddin Afif 70'	Report	Neill 4'; Abdul-Rahman 82'

New Laos National Stadium, Vientiane
Referee: Zayniddin Alimov (Kyrgyzstan)
3 September 2026
21:00

Laos	0–3	Indonesia
	Report	Fabio 5'; Gholy 40', 63'

New Laos National Stadium, Vientiane
Referee: Wissam Rabie (Syria)

6 September 2026
16:00

Australia	0–2	Indonesia
	Report	Leeming 28'; Brkić 90'

New Laos National Stadium, Vientiane
Referee: Omar Al-Yaqoubi (Oman)
6 September 2026
19:00

Malaysia	2–1	Laos
Haziq 7'; Fadhlul Hadi 76'	Report	Odin 60'

New Laos National Stadium, Vientiane
Referee: Songkran Bunmeekiart (Thailand)

=== Ranking of second-placed teams ===
Group A contained only three teams, as opposed to four teams in all other groups, after the Philippines' withdrawal. Therefore, the results against the fourth-placed team were not counted when determining the ranking of the runner-up teams.

Pos	Grp	Team	Pld	W	D	L	GF	GA	GD	Pts	Qualification
1	A	Lebanon	2	1	0	1	5	5	0	3	Qualified for the final tournament
2	E	Oman	2	1	0	1	4	4	0	3	Qualified for the final tournament
3	C	Iran	2	1	0	1	3	3	0	3	Qualified for the final tournament
4	D	Jordan	2	1	0	1	2	2	0	3	Qualified for the final tournament
5	F	Thailand	2	1	0	1	2	3	−1	3	Qualified for the final tournament
6	B	India	2	1	0	1	1	4	−3	3	Qualified for the final tournament
7	H	Malaysia	2	0	2	0	2	2	0	2	Qualified for the final tournament
8	G	Kuwait	2	0	0	2	1	7	−6	0	

Source: AFC
Rules for classification: 1) Points; 2) Goal difference; 3) Goals scored; 4) Disciplinary points; 5) Drawing of lots.

=== Ranking of fourth-placed teams ===
Pos	Grp	Team	Pld	W	D	L	GF	GA	GD	Pts	Relegation
1	F	Turkmenistan	3	1	0	2	4	5	−1	3	
2	D	Bahrain	3	1	0	2	5	7	−2	3	
3	G	Cambodia	3	1	0	2	2	14	−12	3	Relegated to the development phase
4	E	Hong Kong	3	0	1	2	1	6	−5	1	Relegated to the development phase
5	C	Vietnam	3	0	0	3	2	8	−6	0	Relegated to the development phase
6	H	Laos	3	0	0	3	1	7	−6	0	Relegated to the development phase
7	B	Bangladesh	3	0	0	3	0	8	−8	0	Relegated to the development phase
8	A	Philippines	0	0	0	0	0	0	0	0	Relegated to the development phase

Source: AFC
Rules for classification: 1) points; 2) goal difference; 3) goals scored; 4) disciplinary points; 5) drawing of lots.

== Development phase ==
=== Group I ===
- All matches were held in Mongolia.
- Times listed are UTC+8.

Pos	Team	Pld	W	D	L	GF	GA	GD	Pts	Promotion
1	Mongolia (H)	2	2	0	0	10	0	+10	6	Promotion to qualification phase
2	Guam	2	1	0	1	3	3	0	3	Promotion to qualification phase
3	Northern Mariana Islands	2	0	0	2	0	10	−10	0	
4	Nepal	0	0	0	0	0	0	0	0	Suspended by FIFA

Source: AFC
Rules for classification: Qualification tiebreakers
(H) Hosts
31 August 2026
13:00

Northern Mariana Islands	0–7	Mongolia
	Report	Erdenebaatar 14', 86'; Dayan 35'; Enkhbayar 51', 59'; Erkhes 90+3'; Mendjargal 90+4'

MFF Football Centre, Ulaanbaatar
Referee: Lakmal Weerakkody (Sri Lanka)

3 September 2026
13:00

Guam	3–0	Northern Mariana Islands
Solomon 29', 50'; Isaac 82'	Report

MFF Football Centre, Ulanbaatar
Referee: Virendha Rai (Bhutan)

6 September 2026
13:00

Mongolia	3–0	Guam
Erdenebaatar 16'; Mendjargal 34'; Khabul 66'	Report

MFF Football Centre, Ulanbaatar
Referee: Wong Wai Lun (Hong Kong)

=== Group J ===
- All matches were held in Bhutan.
- Times listed are UTC+6.

Pos	Team	Pld	W	D	L	GF	GA	GD	Pts	Promotion
1	Chinese Taipei	3	3	0	0	9	1	+8	9	Promotion to qualification phase
2	Singapore	3	2	0	1	4	3	+1	6	Promotion to qualification phase
3	Bhutan (H)	3	1	0	2	9	5	+4	3	
4	Macau	3	0	0	3	0	13	−13	0	

Source: AFC
Rules for classification: Qualification tiebreakers
(H) Hosts
31 August 2026
15:00

Chinese Taipei	5–0	Macau
Wang Hong-Ruei 17', 53'; Lai Yi-Chiao 47'; Finotti 67' (pen.), 89'	Report

Changlimithang Stadium, Thimphu
Referee: Mohamed Saad (Bahrain)
31 August 2026
18:00

Singapore	3–1	Bhutan
Jaden Heng 11'; Jadon Quah 34'; Lukyan Tan 81'	Report	Kelden 55'

Changlimithang Stadium, Thimphu
Referee: Baraa Aisha (Palestine)

3 September 2026
15:00

Macau	0–1	Singapore
	Report	Sarrvin Raj 28'

Changlimithang Stadium, Thimphu
Referee: Yahya Al-Balushi (Oman)
3 September 2026
18:00

Bhutan	1–2	Chinese Taipei
Kelden 66'	Report	Finotti 8'; Cheng Yu-Chen 81'

Changlimithang Stadium, Thimphu
Referee: Nurzatbek Abdıkadırov (Kyrgyzstan)

6 September 2026
15:00

Chinese Taipei	2–0	Singapore
Sung Chi-Chan 63', 82'	Report

Changlimithang Stadium, Thimphu
Referee: Mohamed Saad (Bahrain)
6 September 2026
18:00

Bhutan	7–0	Macau
Rinzin 1', 6', 31', 66'; Kelden 4'; Tshewang 35'; Yezer 80'	Report

Changlimithang Stadium, Thimphu
Referee: Baraa Aisha (Palestine)

=== Group K ===
- All matches were held in Myanmar.
- Times listed are UTC+6:30.

Pos	Team	Pld	W	D	L	GF	GA	GD	Pts	Promotion
1	Myanmar (H)	3	3	0	0	17	0	+17	9	Promotion to qualification phase
2	Maldives	3	2	0	1	6	6	0	6	Promotion to qualification phase
3	Sri Lanka	3	1	0	2	2	8	−6	3	
4	Brunei	3	0	0	3	0	11	−11	0	

Source: AFC
Rules for classification: Qualification tiebreakers
(H) Hosts
31 August 2026
16:00

Myanmar	4–0	Sri Lanka
Sai Bo Bo Kyaw 18'; Kaung Khant Kyaw 27', 39'; Sai Zom Shang 86'	Report

Thuwunna Stadium, Yangon
Referee: Venkatesh Ramachandran (India)
31 August 2026
19:00

Maldives	2–0	Brunei
Zaki 18'; Imran 31'	Report

Thuwunna Stadium, Yangon
Referee: Muath Owfi (Palestine)

3 September 2026
16:00

Brunei	0–7	Myanmar
	Report	Aung Thi Ha 24'; Thura Min Thant 37'; Danial 72' (o.g.); Thaw Zin Ko 74', 84'; Sai Bo Bo Kyaw 81'; Kyaw Nyi Nyi 82'

Thuwunna Stadium, Yangon
Referee: Ahmad Yacoub Ibrahim (Jordan)
3 September 2026
19:00

Sri Lanka	0–4	Maldives
	Report	Imran 45+3'; Shamhaan 60'; Nasir 78', 80'

Thuwunna Stadium, Yangon
Referee: Hussein Abo Yehia (Lebanon)

6 September 2026
16:00

Myanmar	6–0	Maldives
Thaw Zin Ko 10'; Thura Min Thant 21', 53'; Kaung Khant Kyaw 57', 71'; Swan Zar Ni 86'	Report

Thuwunna Stadium, Yangon
Referee: Venkatesh Ramachandran (India)
6 September 2026
19:00

Brunei	0–2	Sri Lanka
	Report	Katheem 46'; Maleek 67'

Thuwunna Stadium, Yangon
Referee: Khash-Erdene Bold (Mongolia)

== Summary ==
=== Qualified teams ===
A total of 16 teams, including the hosts, will qualify for the final tournament.

Team	Qualified as	Appearance	Previous best performance
China	Hosts	21st	Champions (1985)
South Korea	Group A winners	38th	Champions (Twelve times) (Note: South Korea has won in 1959, 1960, 1963, 1978, 1980, 1982, 1990, 1996, 1998, 2002, 2004 and 2012.)
Uzbekistan	Group B winners	10th	Champions (2023)
North Korea	Group C winners	14th	Champions (1976, 2006, 2010)
Tajikistan	Group D winners	6th	Quarter-finalists (2016, 2018)
Saudi Arabia	Group E winners	16th	Champions (1986, 1992, 2018)
Iraq	Group F winners	20th	Champions (Five times) (Note: Iraq has won in 1975, 1977, 1978, 1988 and 2000.)
Japan	Group G winners	39th	Champions (2016)
Indonesia	Group H winners	21st	Champions (1961)
Lebanon	Best runners-up	3rd	Quarter-finalists (1973)
Oman	2nd-best runners-up	4th	Group stage (2000, 2014, 2023)
Iran	3rd-best runners-up	22nd	Champions (Four times) (Note: Iran has won in 1973, 1974 (Title shared with India), 1975 and 1976.)
Jordan	4th-best runners-up	10th	Fourth place (2006)
Thailand	5th-best runners-up	35th	Champions (1962, 1969)
India	6th-best runners-up	22nd	Champions (1974 (Note: title shared with Iran.))
Malaysia	7th-best runners-up	24th	Runners-up (1959, 1960, 1968)

=== Promotion ===
A total of six teams from the development phase will be promoted to the 2029 AFC U-20 Asian Cup qualification phase.

Team	Qualified as	Appearance	Previous best performance
Mongolia	Group I winners	1st	Debut
Chinese Taipei	Group J winners	1st	Debut
Myanmar	Group K winners	1st	Debut
Guam	Group I runners-up	1st	Debut
Singapore	Group J runners-up	1st	Debut
Maldives	Group K runners-up	1st	Debut

=== Relegation ===
The six lowest-ranked fourth-placed teams from the qualification phase will be relegated to the 2029 AFC U-20 Asian Cup development phase.

Team	Qualified as	Appearance	Previous best performance
Philippines	Lowest fourth-place	1st	Debut
Bangladesh	Second-lowest Fourth-place	1st	Debut
Laos	Third-lowest Fourth-place	1st	Debut
Vietnam	Fourth-lowest Fourth-place	1st	Debut
Hong Kong	Fifth-lowest Fourth-place	1st	Debut
Cambodia	Sixth-lowest Fourth-place	1st	Debut

== Goalscorers ==
=== Qualification phase ===
There were 140 goals scored in 45 matches, for an average of 3.11 goals per match.

5 goals

- (Japan) Homare Tokuda

4 goals

- (Iraq) Moamel Malik

3 goals

- (Kuwait) Mesfer Al-Adwani
- (Uzbekistan) Abraev Kuvonchbek
- (North Korea) Kim Yu-jin
- (United Arab Emirates) Yannick Muller
- (Bahrain) Ali Mahran
- (Oman) Aly Al Alawi

2 goals

- (Afghanistan) Habibullah Hotak
- (Vietnam) Nguyễn Quốc Khánh
- (Malaysia) Fadhlul Hadi
- (Japan) Futa Tokumura
- (Turkmenistan) Ýakupmuhammet Gowşudow
- (Australia) Marcus Neill
- (Indonesia) Zahaby Gholy
- (Yemen) Md Ahmed Saleh Shams Al Dain

1 goal

- (Australia) Alaat Abdul-Rahman
- (Australia) Lewis Marinucci
- (Afghanistan) Farzad Tajik
- (Afghanistan) Yaser Safi
- (Bahrain) Bader Al Asam
- (Bahrain) Abdulla Ebrahim
- (Hong Kong) Cheung Yiu Hin
- (Kuwait) Talal Ibrahim
- (Kuwait) Abdullah Al-Qarzaei
- (Kuwait) Omar Al-Azemi
- (Kuwait) Yousef Allanqawi
- (Laos) Odin Siphanit
- (Indonesia) Amar Brkić
- (Indonesia) Theodore Leeming
- (Indonesia) Fabio Azkairawan
- (North Korea) Ho Myong-ryong
- (North Korea) Pak Kwang-song
- (North Korea) An Jin-sok
- (United Arab Emirates) Butti Khamis Al Jneibi
- (Oman) Hassan Al Qassmi
- (Oman) Ghanim Al Samin
- (Cambodia) David Chhoeun
- (Cambodia) Sou Menghong
- (India) Shami Singamayum
- (India) Mohammad Arbash
- (India) Vishav Yadav
- (India) Danny Laishram
- (Iran) Erfan Khodadadian
- (Iran) Mohammadmahdi Jannianavaei
- (Iran) Mahdi Chesmberah
- (Iran) Arian Maali
- (Iran) Mahan Beheshti
- (Iran) Abolfazl Zadeh Attar
- (Iraq) Sajjad Hussein Al Zayedi
- (Iraq) Ghazi Hasan
- (Japan) Shota Fuji
- (Japan) Asuto Fujita
- (Japan) Kento Hamasaki
- (Japan) Sunao Kidera
- (Japan) Ryuki Osa
- (Japan) Nick Schmidt
- (Japan) Hiroto Asada
- (Jordan) Adeeb Ramadan
- (Jordan) Saoud Abu Zaid
- (Jordan) Naser Al-Dajani
- (South Korea) Kim Min-woo
- (South Korea) Kwon Jun-seong
- (South Korea) Lee Ho-jin
- (Saudi Arabia) Suhayb Al Hawsawi
- (Saudi Arabia) Louay Al Obeidi
- (Saudi Arabia) Elyas Abu Bakr
- (Saudi Arabia) Faris Yousef
- (Kyrgyzstan) Aktan Abdikalilov Akylbekovich
- (Kyrgyzstan) Ilia Bondarenko
- (Lebanon) Gabriel Bassil
- (Lebanon) Marc Nicolas
- (Lebanon) Mohamad Saad
- (Lebanon) Jimmy Kazan
- (Malaysia) Izzuddin Afif
- (Malaysia) Haziq Aziz Ahyok
- (North Korea) Kang Wi-song
- (North Korea) Kang Myong-bom
- (North Korea) Ri Hyok-gwang
- (Palestine) Jasin Abou-Chaker
- (Palestine) Zaki Hamade
- (Palestine) Laieth Tayem
- (Qatar) Ahmad Al Sayed
- (Qatar) Mohannad Babli
- (Qatar) Omar Ali
- (Qatar) Yazan Mohamed
- (Syria) Alam Mamo
- (Syria) Marios Al Herek
- (Syria) Abdullah Al Najar
- (Tajikistan) Asadbek Makhtomov
- (Tajikistan) Abdulloh Sharopov
- (Tajikistan) Azizbek Murotov
- (Tajikistan) Muhammadjon Isakov
- (Tajikistan) Mehrubon Odilzoda
- (Tajikistan) Rustam Kamolov
- (Thailand) Chantawat Katip
- (Thailand) Siwakorn Ponsan
- (Thailand) Siwa Pikulhom
- (Turkmenistan) Medetgeldi Charryev
- (Turkmenistan) Weýisgeldi Orazdurdyýew
- (Uzbekistan) Davron Tulaganov
- (Uzbekistan) Diyor Ermanov
- (Uzbekistan) Kuvanishbek Saydaliev
- (Uzbekistan) Ulugbek Maratov
- (Uzbekistan) Nurbek Sersenbaev
- (Uzbekistan) Shorakhim Shorakhmedov
- (Yemen) Mokhtar Moqbel
- (Yemen) Gehad Zaid

1 own goal

- (Bahrain) Khalid Ahmed Salem (against Tajikistan)
- (Cambodia) Loem Vattana (against Japan)
- (Cambodia) Vreak Phan (against Japan)
- (Kyrgyzstan) Mukhammadi Usuf Makhmudzhanov (against Lebanon)
- (Oman) Fahad Abdullah (against Saudi Arabia)

=== Development phase ===
There were 60 goals scored in 15 matches, for an average of 4 goals per match.

4 goals

- (Bhutan) Rinzin Dorji
- (Myanmar) Kaung Khant Kyaw

3 goals

- (Bhutan) Kelden Dorji
- (Myanmar) Thura Min Thant
- (Myanmar) Thaw Zin Ko
- (Chinese Taipei) Diego Finotti
- (Mongolia) Nyamdorj Erdenebaatar

2 goals

- (Myanmar) Sai Bo Bo Kyaw
- (Guam) Levi Solomon Berg
- (Chinese Taipei) Sung Chi-Chan
- (Chinese Taipei) Wang Hong-Ruei
- (Mongolia) Jason Yondonjamts Mendjargal
- (Mongolia) Enkhbayar Molor
- (Maldives) Mohamed Ilan Imran
- (Maldives) Nassah Nasir

1 goal

- (Sri Lanka) Mohamed Maleek
- (Sri Lanka) Kaleelullah Katheem
- (Bhutan) Thinley Yezer
- (Bhutan) Tandin Tshewang
- (Mongolia) Khabul Baatar
- (Mongolia) Hodges Dantel Dayan
- (Mongolia) Erkhes Enerel
- (Singapore) Jaden Heng
- (Singapore) Sarrvin Raj
- (Singapore) Jadon Quah
- (Singapore) Lukyan Tan
- (Guam) Kian Isaac Aquon Rivera
- (Chinese Taipei) Lai Yi-Chia
- (Chinese Taipei) Cheng Yu-Chen
- (Myanmar) Sai Zom Shang
- (Myanmar) Swan Zar Ni
- (Myanmar) Aung Thi Ha
- (Myanmar) Kyaw Nyi Nyi
- (Maldives) Mohamed Shamhaan
- (Maldives) Ethan Ibrahim Zaki

1 own goal

- (Brunei) Azri Danial (against Myanmar)

== See also ==
- 2027 AFC U-20 Asian Cup
- FIFA U-20 World Cup
- 2027 AFC U-17 Asian Cup qualification
