= Vietnam national under-20 football team =

Vietnam Under-20
- Nickname(s): Những chiến binh Sao Vàng (Golden Star Warriors)
- Association: Vietnam Football Federation (VFF)
- Confederation: AFC (Asia)
- Sub-confederation: AFF (Southeast Asia)
- Head coach: Hoàng Anh Tuấn
- Captain: Nguyễn Quốc Khánh
- Home stadium: Various
- FIFA code: VIE
First colours	Second colours

First international
- as South Vietnam: Indonesia 2–0 South Vietnam (Bangkok, Thailand; 11 April 1961) as Vietnam: Indonesia 7–1 Vietnam (Baoding, China; 19 June 1996)

Biggest win
- Vietnam 18–0 Guam (Ho Chi Minh City, Vietnam; 14 November 2007)

Biggest defeat
- China 9–0 Vietnam (Baoding, China; 21 June 1996)

FIFA U-20 World Cup
- Appearances: 1 (first in 2017)
- Best result: Group stage (2017)

AFC U-20 Asian Cup
- Appearances: 20 (first in 1961 as South Vietnam; 2002 as Vietnam)
- Best result: Fourth place (1961 as South Vietnam); Semi-finals (2016 as Vietnam)

The Vietnam national under-18, under-19 and under-20 football team represents Vietnam at international youth association football competitions for age under-18, under-19, and under-20. It is administered by the Vietnam Football Federation (VFF).

The predecessor of the under-20 national team, South Vietnam, participated AFC Youth Championship from 1961 to 1974 just before the reunification in 1975 (officially in 1976), the football associations merged into the Vietnam Football Federation, with the unified team inheriting South Vietnam's FIFA membership.

== History ==
In 2016, they qualified for the 2017 FIFA U-20 World Cup by advanced to the semi-finals of the 2016 AFC U-19 Championship. They drew their opening game, the first Southeast Asian country to earned a point at a FIFA men's football tournament.

== Competitive records ==
=== FIFA U-20 World Cup ===
Year	Result	GP	W	D	L	GS	GA	Squad
(Tunisia) 1977	Did not enter							
(Japan) 1979	Did not enter							
(Australia) 1981	Did not enter							
(Mexico) 1983	Did not enter							
(Soviet Union) 1985	Did not enter							
(Chile) 1987	Did not enter							
(Saudi Arabia) 1989	Did not enter							
(Portugal) 1991	Did not enter							
(Australia) 1993	Did not enter							
(Qatar) 1995	Did not enter							
(Malaysia) 1997	Did not qualify							
(Nigeria) 1999	Did not qualify							
(Argentina) 2001	Did not qualify							
(United Arab Emirates) 2003	Did not qualify							
(Netherlands) 2005	Did not qualify							
(Canada) 2007	Did not qualify							
(Egypt) 2009	Did not qualify							
(Colombia) 2011	Did not qualify							
(Turkey) 2013	Did not qualify							
(New Zealand) 2015	Did not qualify							
(South Korea) 2017	Group stage	3	0	1	2	0	6	Squad
(Poland) 2019	Did not qualify							
~~2021~~	Canceled due to COVID-19 pandemic							
(Argentina) 2023	Did not qualify							
(Chile) 2025	Did not qualify							
(Azerbaijan) (Uzbekistan) 2027	Did not qualify							
(Armenia) (Georgia (country)) 2029	Did not enter							
Total	1/25	3	0	1	2	0	6	–

FIFA U-20 World Cup history
Season	Round	Opponent	Scores	Result	Venue
2017	Group stage	New Zealand	0–0	Draw	Cheonan, South Korea
2017	Group stage	France	0–4	Loss	Cheonan, South Korea
2017	Group stage	Honduras	0–2	Loss	Jeonju, South Korea

=== AFC U-20 Asian Cup ===
Year	Result	GP	W	D	L	GS	GA
1959–1975	See South Vietnam national under-20 football team						
(Thailand) 1976	Did not enter						
(Iran) 1977	Did not enter						
(Bangladesh) 1978	Did not enter						
(China) ~~1979~~	Canceled						
(Thailand) 1980	Did not enter						
(Thailand) 1982	Did not enter						
(United Arab Emirates) 1985	Did not enter						
(Saudi Arabia) 1986	Did not enter						
(Qatar) 1988	Did not enter						
(Indonesia) 1990	Did not enter						
(United Arab Emirates) 1992	Did not enter						
(Indonesia) 1994	Did not enter						
(South Korea) 1996	Did not qualify						
(Thailand) 1998	Did not qualify						
(Iran) 2000	Did not qualify						
(Qatar) 2002	Group stage	3	0	1	2	3	8
(Malaysia) 2004	Group stage	3	0	0	3	0	3
(India) 2006	Group stage	3	1	0	2	3	6
(Saudi Arabia) 2008	Did not qualify						
(China) 2010	Group stage	3	1	0	2	2	9
(United Arab Emirates) 2012	Group stage	3	0	0	3	2	14
(Myanmar) 2014	Group stage	3	0	1	2	2	10
(Bahrain) 2016	Semi-finals	5	2	2	1	4	5
(Indonesia) 2018	Group stage	3	0	0	3	3	7
(Uzbekistan) ~~2020~~	Qualified but canceled						
(Uzbekistan) 2023	Group stage	3	2	0	1	4	4
(China) 2025	Did not qualify						
(China) 2027	Did not qualify						
(China) 2029	Did not enter						
Total	20/45	29	6	4	19	23	66

Vietnam's AFC U-20 Asian Cup results history
Season	Round	Opponent	Scores	Result	Venue
2002	Group Stage	United Arab Emirates	0–2	Loss	Doha, Qatar
2002	Group Stage	China	2–2	Draw	Doha, Qatar
2002	Group Stage	Syria	1–4	Loss	Doha, Qatar
2004	Group Stage	Malaysia	0–1	Loss	Johor Bahru, Malaysia
2004	Group Stage	Nepal	0–1	Loss	Johor Bahru, Malaysia
2004	Group Stage	Japan	0–1	Loss	Johor Bahru, Malaysia
2006	Group Stage	Malaysia	2–1	Won	Bangalore, India
2006	Group Stage	Iraq	1–3	Loss	Bangalore, India
2006	Group Stage	Saudi Arabia	0–2	Loss	Bangalore, India
2010	Group Stage	Jordan	2–1	Won	Zibo, China
2010	Group Stage	Japan	0–4	Loss	Zibo, China
2010	Group Stage	United Arab Emirates	0–4	Loss	Zibo, China
2012	Group Stage	Uzbekistan	0–4	Loss	Ras al-Khaimah, United Arab Emirates
2012	Group Stage	North Korea	0–5	Loss	Ras al-Khaimah, United Arab Emirates
2012	Group Stage	Jordan	2–5	Loss	Fujairah, United Arab Emirates
2014	Group Stage	South Korea	0–6	Loss	Nay Pyi Taw, Myanmar
2014	Group Stage	Japan	1–3	Loss	Nay Pyi Taw, Myanmar
2014	Group Stage	China	1–1	Draw	Yangon, Myanmar
2016	Group Stage	North Korea	2–1	Won	Isa Town, Bahrain
2016	Group Stage	United Arab Emirates	1–1	Draw	Isa Town, Bahrain
2016	Group Stage	Iraq	0–0	Draw	Riffa, Bahrain
2016	Quarter-finals	Bahrain	1–0	Won	Riffa, Bahrain
2016	Semi-finals	Japan	0–3	Loss	Riffa, Bahrain
2018	Group Stage	Jordan	1–2	Loss	Bekasi, Indonesia
2018	Group Stage	Australia	1–2	Loss	Bekasi, Indonesia
2018	Group Stage	South Korea	1–3	Loss	Bekasi, Indonesia
2023	Group Stage	Australia	1–0	Won	Fergana, Uzbekistan
2023	Group Stage	Qatar	2–1	Won	Fergana, Uzbekistan
2023	Group Stage	Iran	1–3	Loss	Fergana, Uzbekistan

=== ASEAN U-19 Boys Championship ===
ASEAN U-19 Boys Championship
Year	Result	GP	W	D	L	GF	GA
(Thailand) (Cambodia) 2002	4th Place	6	3	0	3	17	6
(Indonesia) 2005	4th Place	6	2	3	1	13	8
(Malaysia) 2006	4th Place	3	0	1	2	3	8
(Vietnam) 2007	Champions	5	4	1	0	16	2
(Thailand) 2008	Did not enter						
(Vietnam) 2009	Third place	5	4	0	1	12	6
(Vietnam) 2010	4th Place	4	0	3	1	4	7
(Myanmar) 2011	Runner-up	6	4	2	0	21	4
(Vietnam) 2012	4th Place	4	0	0	4	1	14
(Indonesia) 2013	Runner-up	7	6	1	0	16	5
(Vietnam) 2014	Runner-up	4	2	0	2	7	5
(Laos) 2015	Runner-up	6	4	1	1	14	6
(Vietnam) 2016	Third place	6	4	1	1	17	10
(Myanmar) 2017	Group stage	4	3	0	1	17	3
(Indonesia) 2018	Group stage	5	2	2	1	11	4
(Vietnam) 2019	Group stage	5	2	1	2	6	6
(Indonesia) 2022	Third place	7	3	3	1	13	7
(Indonesia) 2024	Group stage	3	1	1	1	7	8
(Indonesia) 2026	Group stage	3	2	0	1	9	2
Total	1 Trophy	89	46	20	23	204	111

AFF Youth Championship History
Season	Round	Opponent	Scores	Result	Venue
2002	Group Stage	Cambodia	3–1	Won	Phnom Penh, Cambodia
2002	Group Stage	Philippines	6–0	Won	Phnom Penh, Cambodia
2002	Group Stage	Laos	0–1	Loss	Phnom Penh, Cambodia
2002	Group Stage	Brunei	4–0	Won	Phnom Penh, Cambodia
2002	Semi-finals	Thailand	2–3	Loss	Bangkok, Thailand
2002	Third place play-off	Laos	1–2	Loss	Bangkok, Thailand
2005	Group Stage	Laos	1–1	Draw	Palembang, Indonesia
2005	Group Stage	Singapore	0–0	Draw	Palembang, Indonesia
2005	Group Stage	Timor-Leste	6–2	Won	Palembang, Indonesia
2005	Group Stage	Maldives	4–0	Won	Palembang, Indonesia
2005	Semi-finals	Myanmar	1–1 a.e.t (pens. 5–4)	Loss	Palembang, Indonesia
2005	Third place play-off	Laos	1–4	Loss	Palembang, Indonesia
2006	Group Stage	Malaysia	2–2	Draw	Kuantan, Malaysia
2006	Group Stage	Australia	0–4	Loss	Kuantan, Malaysia
2006	Group Stage	Thailand	1–2	Loss	Kuantan, Malaysia
2007	Group Stage	Cambodia	5–0	Won	Ho Chi Minh City, Vietnam
2007	Group Stage	Thailand	1–1	Draw	Ho Chi Minh City, Vietnam
2007	Group Stage	Brunei	6–0	Won	Ho Chi Minh City, Vietnam
2007	Semi-finals	Myanmar	3–1	Won	Ho Chi Minh City, Vietnam
2007	Final	Malaysia	1–0	Won	Ho Chi Minh City, Vietnam
2009	Group Stage	Malaysia	2–0	Won	Ho Chi Minh City, Vietnam
2009	Group Stage	Myanmar	3–1	Won	Ho Chi Minh City, Vietnam
2009	Group Stage	Timor-Leste	3–1	Won	Ho Chi Minh City, Vietnam
2009	Semi-finals	Australia	1–4	Loss	Ho Chi Minh City, Vietnam
2009	Third place play-off	Malaysia	3–0	Won	Ho Chi Minh City, Vietnam
2010	Group Stage	Thailand	1–1	Draw	Ho Chi Minh City, Vietnam
2010	Group Stage	South Korea	1–1	Draw	Ho Chi Minh City, Vietnam
2010	Group Stage	Australia	1–4	Loss	Ho Chi Minh City, Vietnam
2010	Third place play-off	South Korea	1–1 a.e.t (pens. 6–7)	Loss	Ho Chi Minh City, Vietnam
2011	Group Stage	Brunei	7–0	Won	Yangon, Myanmar
2011	Group Stage	Myanmar	1–1	Draw	Yangon, Myanmar
2011	Group Stage	Indonesia	6–1	Won	Yangon, Myanmar
2011	Group Stage	Laos	4–0	Won	Yangon, Myanmar
2011	Semi-finals	Malaysia	2–1	Won	Yangon, Myanmar
2011	Final	Thailand	1–1 a.e.t (pens. 4–5)	Loss	Yangon, Myanmar
2012	Group Stage	Iran	1–2	Loss	Ho Chi Minh City, Vietnam
2012	Group Stage	Australia	0–4	Loss	Ho Chi Minh City, Vietnam
2012	Group Stage	Uzbekistan	0–4	Loss	Ho Chi Minh City, Vietnam
2012	Third place play-off	Australia	0–4	Loss	Ho Chi Minh City, Vietnam
2013	Group Stage	Thailand	3–2	Won	Gresik, Indonesia
2013	Group Stage	Malaysia	1–0	Won	Sidoarjo, Indonesia
2013	Group Stage	Indonesia	2–1	Won	Gresik, Indonesia
2013	Group Stage	Myanmar	3–1	Won	Gresik, Indonesia
2013	Group Stage	Brunei	6–1	Won	Gresik, Indonesia
2013	Semi-finals	Laos	1–0	Won	Gresik, Indonesia
2013	Final	Indonesia	0–0 a.e.t (pens. 6–7)	Loss	Sidoarjo, Indonesia
2014	Group Stage	Australia	1–0	Won	Hanoi, Vietnam
2014	Group Stage	Japan	2–3	Loss	Hanoi, Vietnam
2014	Semi-finals	Myanmar	4–1	Won	Hanoi, Vietnam
2014	Final	Japan	0–1	Loss	Hanoi, Vietnam
2015	Group Stage	Timor-Leste	2–0	Won	Vientiane, Laos
2015	Group Stage	Malaysia	0–0	Draw	Vientiane, Laos
2015	Group Stage	Singapore	6–0	Won	Vientiane, Laos
2015	Group Stage	Myanmar	2–0	Won	Vientiane, Laos
2015	Semi-finals	Laos	4–0	Won	Vientiane, Laos
2015	Final	Thailand	0–6	Loss	Vientiane, Laos
2016	Group Stage	Singapore	0–0	Draw	Hanoi, Vietnam
2016	Group Stage	Timor-Leste	4–1	Won	Hanoi, Vietnam
2016	Group Stage	Philippines	4–3	Won	Hanoi, Vietnam
2016	Group Stage	Malaysia	3–1	Won	Hanoi, Vietnam
2016	Semi-finals	Australia	2–5	Loss	Hanoi, Vietnam
2016	Third place match	Timor-Leste	4–0	Won	Hanoi, Vietnam
2017	Group Stage	Brunei	8–1	Won	Yangon, Myanmar
2017	Group Stage	Philippines	3–1	Won	Yangon, Myanmar
2017	Group Stage	Indonesia	5–0	Won	Yangon, Myanmar
2017	Group Stage	Myanmar	1–2	Loss	Yangon, Myanmar
2018	Group Stage	Thailand	0–0	Draw	Gresik, Indonesia
2018	Group Stage	Philippines	5–0	Won	Sidoarjo, Indonesia
2018	Group Stage	Laos	4–1	Won	Gresik, Indonesia
2018	Group Stage	Indonesia	0–1	Loss	Sidoarjo, Indonesia
2018	Group Stage	Singapore	2–2	Draw	Gresik, Indonesia
2019	Group Stage	Malaysia	1–0	Won	Ho Chi Minh City, Vietnam
2019	Group Stage	Australia	1–4	Loss	Ho Chi Minh City, Vietnam
2019	Group Stage	Singapore	3–0	Won	Thủ Dầu Một, Vietnam
2019	Group Stage	Thailand	0–0	Draw	Ho Chi Minh City, Vietnam
2019	Group Stage	Cambodia	1–2	Loss	Ho Chi Minh City, Vietnam
2022	Group Stage	Indonesia	0–0	Draw	Bekasi, Indonesia
2022	Group Stage	Philippines	4–1	Won	Jakarta, Indonesia
2022	Group Stage	Brunei	4–0	Won	Bekasi, Indonesia
2022	Group Stage	Myanmar	3–1	Won	Jakarta, Indonesia
2022	Group Stage	Thailand	1–1	Draw	Jakarta, Indonesia
2022	Semi-finals	Malaysia	0–3	Loss	Bekasi, Indonesia
2022	Third place play-off	Thailand	1–1 (pens. 5–3)	Won	Bekasi, Indonesia
2024	Group Stage	Myanmar	1–1	Draw	Surabaya, Indonesia
2024	Group Stage	Australia	2–6	Loss	Surabaya, Indonesia
2024	Group Stage	Laos	4–1	Won	Surabaya, Indonesia
2026	Group Stage	Timor-Leste	3–0	Won	Deli Serdang, Indonesia
2026	Group Stage	Myanmar	5–0	Won	Deli Serdang, Indonesia
2026	Group Stage	Indonesia	1–2	Loss	Deli Serdang, Indonesia

=== Youth Football Games of the Socialist Countries ===
A U-18 Vietnam team participated in at least one edition of this tournament, but its position in any final standings is unknown.

== Results and fixtures ==
Win Draw Lose

=== 2026 ===
16 May 2026 Friendly	Shizuoka Sangyo University (Japan)	1–2	Vietnam	Nagoya, Japan
--:-- UTC+9			Nguyễn Trọng Đức Vũ; Nguyễn Thành Vinh

17 May 2026 Friendly	Shizuoka Sangyo University (Japan)	2–3	Vietnam	Nagoya, Japan
--:-- UTC+9			Nguyễn Thiên Phú; Nguyễn Quốc Khánh; Nguyễn Văn Bách

19 May 2026 Friendly	Tokai Gakuen University (Japan)	Unknown	Vietnam	Nagoya, Japan
--:-- UTC+9

21 May 2026 Friendly	Shimizu S-Pulse U-21 (Japan)	Unknown	Vietnam	Nagoya, Japan
--:-- UTC+9

1 June 2026 ASEAN U-19 Championship GS	Vietnam	3–0	Timor-Leste	Deli Serdang, Indonesia
16:00 UTC+7	Hoàng Công Hậu 2', 83', 90+1'	Report		Stadium: North Sumatra Stadium; Referee: Alongkorn Khonwai (Thailand)

4 June 2026 ASEAN U-19 Championship GS	Myanmar	0–5	Vietnam	Deli Serdang, Indonesia
16:00 UTC+7		Report	Lê Tấn Dũng 28'; Hoàng Công Hậu 45+1'; Nguyễn Văn Bách 49'; Hoàng Trọng Duy Khang 53' (pen.)	Stadium: North Sumatra Stadium; Referee: Zakaria Ismail (Malaysia)

7 June 2026 ASEAN U-19 Championship GS	Indonesia	2–1	Vietnam	Deli Serdang, Indonesia
20:00 UTC+7	Reno 22'; Evandra 90+1' (pen.)	Report	Nguyễn Quốc Khánh 74'	Stadium: North Sumatra Stadium; Referee: Ryo Tanimoto (Japan)

31 August 2026 AFC U-20 Asian Cup qualifiers	Vietnam	0–3	North Korea	Phú Thọ, Vietnam
19:00 UTC+7		Report	Kim Yu-jin 46', 58'; Ri Hyok-gwang 50'	Stadium: Việt Trì Stadium; Referee: Ismaeel Habib Ali (Bahrain)

3 September 2026 AFC U-20 Asian Cup qualifiers	Palestine	2–1	Vietnam	Phú Thọ, Vietnam
19:00 UTC+7	Tayem 34'; Hamade 82'	Report	Nguyễn Quốc Khánh 66'	Stadium: Việt Trì Stadium; Referee: Sami Al-Ismail (Saudi Arabia)

6 September 2026 AFC U-20 Asian Cup qualifiers	Iran	3–1	Vietnam	Phú Thọ, Vietnam
19:00 UTC+7	Arian 50'; Beheshti 63' (pen.); Zadeh 90+5' (pen.)	Report	Nguyễn Quốc Khánh 41'	Stadium: Việt Trì Stadium; Referee: Harish Kundu (India)

11 November 2026 Panda Cup	China	3–1	Vietnam	Chengdu, China
18:35 UTC+8				Stadium: Shuangliu Sports Centre

14 November 2026 Panda Cup	Vietnam	v	South Korea	Chengdu, China
14:30 UTC+8				Stadium: Shuangliu Sports Centre

17 November 2026 Panda Cup	Tajikistan	v	Vietnam	Chengdu, China
14:30 UTC+8				Stadium: Shuangliu Sports Centre

== Players ==
=== Current squad ===
The following 24 players were called up for the 2026 Panda Cup.

Caps and goals as of 14 November 2026 after the match against South Korea.

No.	Pos.	Player	Date of birth (age)	Caps	Goals	Club
1	GK	Lê Hoàng Gia Bảo	8 January 2010 (age 16)	0	0	(Vietnam Football Federation) PVF
22	GK	Lương Anh Chiến	2008 (age 17-18)	1	0	(Vietnam Football Federation) Thể Công–Viettel
24	GK	Nguyễn Bảo Ngọc	28 March 2007 (age 19)	2	0	(Vietnam Football Federation) Sông Lam Nghệ An
2	DF	Nguyễn Quốc Khánh (captain)	15 June 2007 (age 19)	13	3	(Vietnam Football Federation) Ninh Bình
3	DF	Ngô Hoàng Anh	3 May 2008 (age 18)	2	0	(Vietnam Football Federation) SHB Đà Nẵng
4	DF	Lê Huy Việt Anh	21 January 2008 (age 18)	4	0	(Vietnam Football Federation) PVF
5	DF	Nguyễn Ngọc Đô	2008 (age 17-18)	0	0	(Vietnam Football Federation) Khánh Hòa
17	DF	Lê Minh Nhật	15 February 2007 (age 19)	3	0	(Vietnam Football Federation) Quy Nhơn United
18	DF	Nguyễn Tấn Minh	27 July 2007 (age 19)	5	0	(Vietnam Football Federation) Xuân Thiện Phú Thọ
21	DF	Lê Khả Đức	18 September 2007 (age 19)	9	0	(Vietnam Football Federation) Hồ Chí Minh City
6	MF	Hồ Tuấn Minh	2008 (age 17-18)	0	0	(Vietnam Football Federation) Khánh Hòa
8	MF	Nguyễn Văn Khánh	28 November 2008 (age 17)	8	0	(Vietnam Football Federation) Hồng Lĩnh Hà Tĩnh
9	MF	Hoàng Trọng Duy Khang	12 August 2008 (age 18)	8	1	(Vietnam Football Federation) Hải Phòng
10	MF	Thomas Veeren	2008 (age 17-18)	2	0	(French Football Federation) Dunkerque
12	MF	Phạm Tuấn Kiệt	4 June 2010 (age 16)	2	0	(Vietnam Football Federation) PVF
13	MF	Đậu Hồng Phong	6 September 2008 (age 18)	7	0	(Vietnam Football Federation) Hà Nội
14	MF	Lê Toàn	2008 (age 17-18)	0	0	(Vietnam Football Federation) Khánh Hòa
15	MF	Trần Hoàng Khanh	11 January 2008 (age 18)	5	0	(Vietnam Football Federation) PVF
20	MF	Nguyễn Quốc Khánh	22 January 2008 (age 18)	0	0	(Vietnam Football Federation) Phù Đổng
7	FW	Antonio Moric	11 May 2008 (age 18)	2	1	(Croatian Football Federation) Rudeš
11	FW	Hoàng Trung Anh	6 April 2010 (age 16)	0	0	(Vietnam Football Federation) PVF
16	FW	Trần Quốc Hòa	1 August 2007 (age 19)	2	0	(Vietnam Football Federation) Sông Lam Nghệ An
19	FW	Nguyễn Văn Bách	8 February 2008 (age 18)	7	2	(Vietnam Football Federation) PVF
23	FW	Hoàng Công Hậu	27 June 2007 (age 19)	6	4	(Vietnam Football Federation) Huê

=== Recent call-ups ===
The following players have been called up for the team within the last 12 months and are still available for selection.

Pos.	Player	Date of birth (age)	Caps	Goals	Club	Latest call-up
GK	Hoa Xuân Tín	29 January 2008 (age 18)	5	0	(Vietnam) Công An Hồ Chí Minh City	2027 AFC U-20 Asian Cup qualification
GK	Phan Đình Bách	2 January 2008 (age 18)	1	0	(Vietnam) PVF	2027 AFC U-20 Asian Cup qualification
GK	Trần Văn Đạt	25 April 2008 (age 18)	0	0	(Vietnam) Sông Lam Nghệ An	2027 AFC U-20 Asian Cup qualification
GK	Phạm Huy Hoàng	27 February 2007 (age 19)	0	0	(Vietnam) Ninh Bình	2026 ASEAN U-19 Boys' Championship
GK	Nguyễn Thành Lợi	15 November 2009 (age 16)	0	0	(Vietnam) Hoàng Anh Gia Lai	2026 ASEAN U-19 Boys' Championship ^{PRE}
GK	Nguyễn Bá Nhật Ka	20 April 2007 (age 19)	0	0	(Japan) Ryutsu Keizai University	Centralized training camp, May 2026
GK	Aaron Napierala	2007 (age 18-19)	0	0	(Vietnam) Bắc Ninh	Centralized training camp, March 2026
GK	Cù Lưu Hậu	4 June 2008 (age 18)	0	0	(Vietnam) Hồ Chí Minh City	Centralized training camp, March 2026
GK	Đặng Thiện Quang		0	0	(Vietnam) Hải Phỏng	Centralized training camp, March 2026
GK	Trương Lê Anh Vũ		0	0	(Vietnam) Đắk Lắk	Centralized training camp, March 2026
DF	Lê Tấn Dũng	8 January 2008 (age 18)	6	1	(Vietnam) Hưng Yên	2027 AFC U-20 Asian Cup qualification
DF	Đinh Quang Kiệt	16 July 2007 (age 19)	5	0	(Vietnam) Công An Hồ Chí Minh City	2027 AFC U-20 Asian Cup qualification
DF	Đinh Xuân Khải	24 June 2007 (age 19)	3	0	(Vietnam) Xuân Thiện Phú Thọ	2027 AFC U-20 Asian Cup qualification
DF	Bùi Duy Đăng	22 January 2008 (age 18)	2	0	(Vietnam) PVF	2027 AFC U-20 Asian Cup qualification
DF	Nguyễn Hoàng Nam	7 October 2007 (age 19)	0	0	(Vietnam) Vạn Xuân Đan Phượng	2026 ASEAN U-19 Boys' Championship
DF	Hoàng Minh Hợi	5 August 2007 (age 19)	6	0	(Vietnam) Sông Lam Nghệ An	2026 ASEAN U-19 Boys' Championship
DF	Lương Văn Phương	17 October 2007 (age 19)	0	0	(Vietnam) Quy Nhơn United	2026 ASEAN U-19 Boys' Championship ^{PRE}
DF	Lê Nam Long	12 April 2007 (age 19)	0	0	(Vietnam) An Giang	Centralized training camp, May 2026
DF	Trần Đông Thức	30 September 2008 (age 18)	0	0	(Vietnam) Sông Lam Nghệ An	Centralized training camp, May 2026
DF	Chử Ngọc Diệp	28 July 2007 (age 19)	0	0	(Vietnam) Thái Nguyên	Centralized training camp, March 2026
DF	Nguyễn Văn Quân	21 January 2008 (age 18)	0	0	(Vietnam) Hà Nội	Centralized training camp, March 2026
DF	Nguyễn Công Vi Nhân	2007 (age 18-19)	0	0	(Vietnam) SHB Đà Nẵng	Centralized training camp, March 2026
DF	Phùng Bá Đức Anh	2008 (age 17-18)	0	0	(Vietnam) SHB Đà Nẵng	Centralized training camp, March 2026
MF	Nguyễn Lê Phát	12 January 2007 (age 19)	6	1	(Vietnam) Ninh Bình	2027 AFC U-20 Asian Cup qualification
MF	Trần Gia Hưng	24 August 2007 (age 19)	5	0	(Vietnam) Hải Phòng	2027 AFC U-20 Asian Cup qualification
MF	Đào Quang Anh	18 May 2007 (age 19)	3	0	(Vietnam) PVF	2027 AFC U-20 Asian Cup qualification
MF	Trương Gia Khôi	2008 (age 17-18)	0	0	(Spain) Huesca	2026 ASEAN U-19 Boys' Championship
MF	Nguyễn Thành Vinh	3 April 2007 (age 19)	1	0	(Vietnam) SHB Đà Nẵng	2026 ASEAN U-19 Boys' Championship
MF	Bạch Trọng Dương	28 February 2008 (age 18)	0	0	(Vietnam) Sông Lam Nghệ An	2026 ASEAN U-19 Boys' Championship ^{PRE}
MF	Hoàng Văn Thái	28 November 2008 (age 17)	0	0	(Vietnam) Thể Công–Viettel	2026 ASEAN U-19 Boys' Championship ^{PRE}
MF	Lê Nguyễn Phương Nam	21 April 2007 (age 19)	0	0	(Vietnam) Quy Nhơn United	2026 ASEAN U-19 Boys' Championship ^{INJ}
MF	Vương Quốc Dũng	25 April 2007 (age 19)	0	0	(Vietnam) PVF	Centralized training camp, May 2026
MF	Đặng Đình Chiến Thắng	2007 (age 18-19)	0	0	(Vietnam) Hồng Lĩnh Hà Tĩnh	Centralized training camp, May 2026
MF	Khuất Đốn Tùng	11 December 2008 (age 17)	0	0	(Vietnam) PVF	Centralized training camp, May 2026
MF	Đoàn Huy Long	16 October 2007 (age 19)	0	0	(Vietnam) PVF	Centralized training camp, March 2026
MF	Ngô Hoàng Gia Huy	28 March 2008 (age 18)	0	0	(Vietnam) Hồ Chí Minh City	Centralized training camp, March 2026
MF	Nguyễn Đức Nhật	29 March 2008 (age 18)	0	0	(Vietnam) PVF	Centralized training camp, March 2026
MF	Nguyễn Chí Hướng	21 February 2008 (age 18)	0	0	(Vietnam) Hoàng Anh Gia Lai	Centralized training camp, March 2026
FW	Nguyễn Thiên Phú	25 January 2008 (age 18)	4	1	(Vietnam) Thái Nguyên	2027 AFC U-20 Asian Cup qualification
FW	Nguyễn Trọng Đức Vũ	17 October 2007 (age 19)	3	0	(Vietnam) Hưng Yên	2027 AFC U-20 Asian Cup qualification
FW	Trần Gia Bảo	3 January 2008 (age 18)	3	0	(Vietnam) Hoàng Anh Gia Lai	2027 AFC U-20 Asian Cup qualification
FW	Phạm Anh Khôi	22 August 2007 (age 19)	0	0	(Belgium) Royal Antwerp	2026 ASEAN U-19 Boys' Championship ^{INJ}
FW	Nguyễn Sỹ Mạnh Dũng	16 September 2007 (age 19)	0	0	(Vietnam) PVF	2026 ASEAN U-19 Boys' Championship ^{PRE}
FW	Lê Văn Hoàn	4 February 2007 (age 19)	0	0	(Vietnam) Thanh Hóa	Centralized training camp, May 2026
FW	Nguyễn Anh Minh	2007	0	0	(Vietnam) Thống Nhất Sports Center	Centralized training camp, May 2026
FW	Nguyễn Hữu Thiện	2007	0	0	(Vietnam) Đồng Tháp	Centralized training camp, May 2026
FW	Nguyễn Doãn Mạnh		0	0	(Vietnam) Hồng Lĩnh Hà Tĩnh	Centralized training camp, March 2026
^{PRE} Preliminary squad; ^{INJ} Player withdrew from the squad due to an injury.; ^{WD} Player withdrew from the squad due to other reason.; ^{SUS} Serving suspension.

== Coaching staff ==
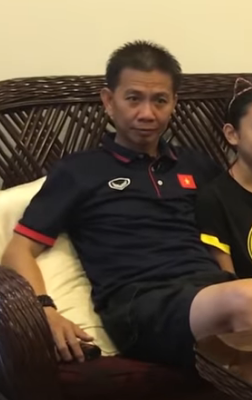
Hoàng Anh Tuấn is the current head coach and considered the best coach in the history of under 20 Vietnamese football.

Position	Name
Head coach	Hoàng Anh Tuấn
Assistant Coach	Âu Văn Hoàn
Assistant Coach	Nguyễn Hồng Phong
Assistant Coach	Tạ Bạch Sơn
Goalkeeping coach	Nguyễn Bá Minh Hiếu
Fitness coach	Lê Tấn Tài
Video analyst	(Vietnam) Giáp Tùng Linh
Kit manager	(Vietnam) Nguyễn Đức Mạnh
Doctor	(Vietnam) Nguyễn Văn Nu
Doctor	(Vietnam) Trương Hoài Nam

=== Head coach history ===
Head coaches by years (1999–present)

Years	Name	Nationality	Achievements
1999	Nguyễn Văn Vinh	Vietnam	
2000	Quản Trọng Hùng	Vietnam	
2002–2003	Nguyễn Văn Thịnh	Vietnam	2002 AFF U-20 Youth Championship: Fourth Place
2004	Đoàn Minh Xương	Vietnam	
2005	Nguyễn Hữu Thắng	Vietnam	2005 AFF U-20 Youth Championship: Fourth Place
2006	Lê Tuấn Long	Vietnam	2006 AFF U-20 Youth Championship: Fourth Place
2007	Nguyễn Mạnh Cường	Vietnam	2007 AFF U-20 Youth Championship: Champions
2009	Võ Hoàng Bửu	Vietnam	2009 AFF U-19 Youth Championship: Third Place
2010–2011	Triệu Quang Hà	Vietnam	2010 AFF U-19 Youth Championship: Fourth Place; 2011 AFF U-19 Youth Championship Runner-up
2012	Mai Đức Chung	Vietnam	2012 AFF U-19 Youth Championship: Fourth Place
2013–2014	Guillaume Graechen	France	2013 AFF U-19 Youth Championship: Runner-up; 2014 AFF U-19 Youth Championship: Runner-up
2015–2019	Hoàng Anh Tuấn	Vietnam	2015 AFF U-19 Youth Championship: Runner-up; 2016 AFF U-19 Youth Championship: Third Place; 2016 AFC U-19 Championship: Semi-finalist; 2017 FIFA U-20 World Cup: Group Stage
2019–2021	Philippe Troussier	France	
2022	Đinh Thế Nam	Vietnam	2022 AFF U-19 Youth Championship: Third Place
2022–2024	Hoàng Anh Tuấn	Vietnam	
2024	Hứa Hiền Vinh	Vietnam	
2025–2026	Yutaka Ikeuchi	Japan	
2026–present	Hoàng Anh Tuấn	Vietnam	

== Honours ==
=== Regional ===
AFF U-19 Youth Championship

Winners (1): 2007
(silver) Runner-up (4): 2011, 2013, 2014, 2015
(bronze) Third place (3): 2009, 2016, 2022

=== Friendly ===
- KBZ Bank Cup:

Winners: 2016

- International Thanh Niên Newspaper Cup:

Winners: 2022

== See also ==
- Vietnam national football team
- South Vietnam national under-20 football team (predecessor)
- Vietnam national under-23 football team
- Vietnam national under-17 football team
