= Hoàng Anh Tuấn (footballer) =

Vietnamese footballer & manager

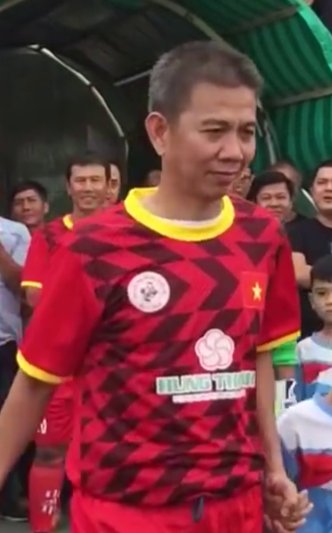
- Hoang Anh Tuan in 2019

Personal information
- Date of birth: 2 August 1968 (age 58)
- Place of birth: Khánh Hòa, South Vietnam
- Height: 1.70 m (5 ft 7 in)
- Positions: Left winger; left back

Team information
- Current team: Vietnam U16 (interim)

Youth career
- 1982–1986: Khánh Hòa

Senior career*
Years	Team	Apps	(Gls)
1987–2003	Khánh Hòa	173	(16)

Managerial career
- 2007–2012: Khatoco Khánh Hòa
- 2013–2014: Xi măng Vicem Hải Phòng
- 2015–2019: Vietnam U19
- 2022–2024: Vietnam U20
- 2023–2024: Vietnam U17
- 2023: Vietnam U23 (caretaker)
- 2024: Vietnam U23 (caretaker)
- 2024: Becamex Bình Dương
- 2025: Bắc Ninh
- 2026–: Vietnam U16
- 2026–: Vietnam U20
Medal record
Men's football
Representing Vietnam
AFF U-23 Championship
Winner	Thailand 2023
- * Club domestic league appearances and goals

Hoàng Anh Tuấn (born 2 August 1968) is a Vietnamese former footballer who played as a left winger and left back, who is the head coach of Vietnam U16 football team. He is considered as one of the best managers in Vietnam.

== Coaching career ==
He is considered one of Vietnam's most well-qualified coaches. He helds the UEFA A Licence and the AFC Pro Licence. He is also the only Vietnamese coach chosen by the German Football Association (DFB) to attend the A-level (senior) training course in August 2009, at the Hennef Sports School.

In the coaching world, Anh Tuấn is good at English and was proposed several times by the Vietnam Football Federation to become the assistant coach for foreign coaches of the Vietnam national team.

On 23 October 2016, he coached Vietnam U19 team that defeats Bahrain U19 in the quarter-finals of the 2016 AFC U-19 Championship to enter the semi-finals of the tournament, earning tickets to the 2017 FIFA U-20 World Cup in South Korea. This is also the first time a team of 11 football player of Vietnam participated in a World Cup tournament of FIFA. On 26 August 2023, he led Vietnam U-23 becoming champions at the 2023 AFF U-23 Championship, winning the first major trophy in his career.

On 4 July 2024, Hoàng Anh Tuấn was appointed as the head coach of V.League 1 side Becamex Bình Dương, making his return to club football after 10 years.

On 5 March 2025, Hoàng Anh Tuấn was appointed as the head coach of Vietnamese Football League Second Division club Bắc Ninh

== Managerial statistics ==
As of 20 April 2024

Managerial record by team and tenure
Team	From	To	Record				
Team	From	To	P	W	D	L	Win %
Khanh Hoa	1 August 2007	31 August 2012	139	54	32	53	38.85
Haiphong	1 February 2013	31 December 2013	22	8	5	9	36.36
Vietnam U23 (caretaker)	8 August 2023	7 October 2023	8	4	2	2	50.00
Vietnam U23 (caretaker)	28 March 2024	28 April 2024	5	2	1	2	40.00
Total			174	68	40	66	39.08

== Honours ==
Vietnam U19

- AFF U-19 Youth Championship runners-up: 2015; third place: 2016
- AFC U-19 Championship fourth place: 2016

Vietnam U23

- AFF U-23 Championship: 2023
