= Mongolia national under-20 football team =

National U-20 association football team

Mongolia Under-20
- Association: MFF
- Head coach: I Otgonbayar
First colours	Second colours

First international
- Mongolia 0–7 South Korea (Ulaanbaatar, Mongolia; 16 September 2022)

Biggest win
- Mongolia 7–0 Northern Mariana Islands (Ulaanbaatar, Mongolia; 31 August 2026)

Biggest defeat
- Mongolia 0–10 Australia (Chengdu, China; 19 November 2024)
Medal record
Men's football
Representing Mongolia
East Asian Youth Games
Bronze medal – third place	2023 Ulaanbaatar	Team

The Mongolia national under-20 football team is a youth football team operated under the auspices of Mongolian Football Federation.

== Results and fixtures ==
=== 2026 ===
31 August 2026 2027 AFC U-20 Asian Cup qualification	Northern Mariana Islands	0–7	Mongolia	MFF Football Centre, Ulaanbaatar
13:00		Report	Erdenebaatar 14', 86'; Dayan 35'; Enkhbayar 51', 59'; Erkhes 90+3'; Jason 90+4'	Referee: Kasun Lakmal Weerakkody (Sri Lanka)

6 September 2026 2027 AFC U-20 Asian Cup qualification	Mongolia	3–0	Guam	MFF Football Centre, Ulaanbaatar
13:00	Erdenebaatar 16'; Mendjargal 34'; Khabul 66'	Report		Referee: Wong Wai Lun (Hong Kong)

== Competitions ==
=== Performance at the AFC U-20 Asian Cup ===
- (Uzbekistan) 2020 AFC U-19 Championship cancelled
- (Uzbekistan) 2023 AFC U-20 Asian Cup did not qualify
- (China) 2025 AFC U-20 Asian Cup did not qualify
- (China) 2027 AFC U-20 Asian Cup did not qualify
- (China) 2029 AFC U-20 Asian Cup to be determined

=== AFC U-20 Asian Cup qualification ===
- (Uzbekistan) 2020 AFC U-19 Championship qualification did not qualify
- (Uzbekistan) 2023 AFC U-20 Asian Cup qualification did not qualify
- (China) 2025 AFC U-20 Championship qualification did not qualify
- (China) 2027 AFC U-20 Asian Cup qualification to be determined

=== Performance at the FIFA U-20 World Cup ===
- (Chile) 2025 did not qualify
- (Azerbaijan) (Uzbekistan) 2027 did not qualify
- (Armenia) (Georgia (country)) 2029 to be determined
