= Football at the 2023 East Asian Youth Games =

International football competition in Mongolia

Tournament details
- Host country: Mongolia
- City: Ulaanbaatar
- Dates: 17–22 August
- Teams: 4(men); 4(women)
- Venue(s): Mongolian Football Federation's Stadium

Football was held at the 2023 East Asian Youth Games during August 17 to 22, 2023, at the Mongolian Football Federation's Stadium in Ulaanbaatar, Mongolia. Only boys born on 2005.01.01 – 2007.12.31 and girls born on 2005.01.01-2008.12.31 were allowed to participate.

== Medal table ==
* Host nation (Mongolia)

Rank	Nation	Gold	Silver	Bronze	Total
1	Chinese Taipei (TPE)	1	0	0	1
1	South Korea (KOR)	1	0	0	1
3	Hong Kong (HKG)	0	1	1	2
4	China (CHN)	0	1	0	1
5	Mongolia (MGL)	0	0	1	1
Totals (5 entries)		2	2	2	6

== Medal summary ==
Event	Gold	Silver	Bronze
Men	Chinese Taipei	Hong Kong	Mongolia
Women	South Korea	China	Hong Kong

== Men`s event ==
Pos	Team	Pld	W	D	L	GF	GA	GD	Pts	Qualification
1	Chinese Taipei	3	3	0	0	21	1	+20	9	Gold Medal
2	Hong Kong	3	2	0	1	5	9	−4	6	Silver Medal
3	Mongolia (H)	3	1	0	2	4	6	−2	3	Bronze Medal
4	Macau	3	0	0	3	1	15	−14	0	

Rules for classification: Group stage tiebreakers
(H) Hosts
18 August 2023
12:30 UTC+8

Hong Kong	3–0	Macau

18 August 2023
17:00 UTC+8

Chinese Taipei	4–0	Mongolia

20 August 2023
12:30 UTC+8

Macau	1–9	Chinese Taipei
Etchi 9'

20 August 2023
17:00 UTC+8

Mongolia	1–2	Hong Kong

22 August 2023
12:30 UTC+8

Hong Kong	0–8	Chinese Taipei

22 August 2023
17:00 UTC+8

Mongolia	3–0	Macau

== Women`s event ==
Pos	Team	Pld	W	D	L	GF	GA	GD	Pts	Qualification
1	South Korea	3	3	0	0	25	0	+25	9	Gold Medal
2	China	3	2	0	1	15	3	+12	6	Silver Medal
3	Hong Kong	3	1	0	2	6	16	−10	3	Bronze Medal
4	Mongolia (H)	3	0	0	3	1	28	−27	0	

Rules for classification: Group stage tiebreakers
(H) Hosts
17 August 2023
12:30 UTC+8

South Korea	11–0	Hong Kong

17 August 2023
17:00 UTC+8

Mongolia	0–11	China

19 August 2023
12:30 UTC+8

China	0–2	South Korea

19 August 2023
17:00 UTC+8

Hong Kong	5–1	Mongolia

21 August 2023
12:30 UTC+8

China	4–1	Hong Kong

21 August 2023
17:00 UTC+8

South Korea	12–0	Mongolia
