= Nguyễn Quốc Khánh =

Vietnamese footballer (born 2007)

Personal information
- Full name: Nguyễn Quốc Khánh
- Date of birth: 15 May 2007 (age 19)
- Place of birth: Thái Nguyên, Vietnam
- Height: 1.80 m (5 ft 11 in)
- Positions: Center-back; right-back

Team information
- Current team: Ninh Bình (on loan from PVF)
- Number: 33

Youth career
- 2018–2023: PVF

Senior career*
Years	Team	Apps	(Gls)
2023–	PVF	18	(1)
2025–2026	→ PVF-CAND B (loan)	9	(1)
2026–	→ Ninh Bình (loan)	0	(0)

International career^{‡}
2023	Vietnam U17	4	(0)
2024–2026	Vietnam U20	11	(3)
- * Club domestic league appearances and goals as of 6 June 2026 ‡ National team caps and goals as of 6 September 2026

Nguyễn Quốc Khánh (born 15 May 2007) is a Vietnamese professional footballer who plays as a center-back or right-back for V.League 1 club Ninh Bình, on loan from PVF.

== Early career ==
Quốc Khánh joined PVF Football Academy in 2018 after being catching the eyes of the team's scouts in the Thái Nguyên province youth football tournament.

== Club career ==
At the age of 17, Quốc Khánh made his senior debut for PVF at the 2023 Vietnamese Second Division. In the 2025–26 season, he moved to PVF-CAND B, and made his professional football debut with the team.

In July 2026, Quốc Khánh joined V.League 1 club Ninh Bình on a three-year loan deal from PVF.

== International career ==
Quốc Khánh participated in the 2023 AFC U-17 Asian Cup, where he started in all three group stage matches as Vietnam U17 advance to the next stage.

Quốc Khánh captained the Vietnam U19 squad during the 2026 ASEAN U-19 Boys' Championship and the 2027 AFC U-20 Asian Cup qualification. Despite his solid performances, Vietnam suffered early exits in both competitions.

== Personal life ==
Quốc Khánh is currently studying International Business Management at British University Vietnam.
