= Mahan Beheshti =

Iranian footballer (born 2009)

Personal information
- Date of birth: 28 February 2009 (age 17)
- Place of birth: Bandar-e Anzali, Iran
- Height: 1.79 m (5 ft 10 in)
- Position: Attacking midfielder

Team information
- Current team: Malavan
- Number: 19

Youth career
- Malavan

Senior career*
Years	Team	Apps	(Gls)
2025–	Malavan	20	(1)

International career
2024–	Iran U17	12	(4)
2026–	Iran U20	4	(1)
- * Club domestic league appearances and goals as of 23:14, 22 May 2025 (UTC)

Mahan Beheshti (Persian: ماهان بهشتی; born 28 February 2009) is an Iranian professional footballer who plays as an attacking midfielder for Malavan.

== Club career ==
Born in Bandar-e Anzali in the Gilan Province of Iran, Beheshti joined the academy of Malavan at a young age. In September 2024 he was called up to the Malavan first-team squad by manager Maziar Zare, alongside fellow youth team players Farhan Jafari, Ilia Imani, and Alireza Ramezani. The following year he made his professional debut at the age of sixteen, starting in Malavan's 1–1 draw with Foolad and playing fifty-four minutes before being replaced by Mohammad Omari.

== International career ==
Beheshti was called up to the Iranian under-17 team for the 2024 CAFA U-17 Championship, but only featured once as Iran finished fourth in the tournament. The following year he was called up to the 2025 AFC U-17 Asian Cup, and scored a free-kick against Oman in Iran's 3–2 group stage loss.

Mahan Beheshti was invited to the Iran national under-20 football team on 10 August 2026 to participate in the 2027 AFC U-20 Asian Cup qualification.

== Career statistics ==
=== Club ===
As of 22 May 2025.

Appearances and goals by club, season and competition
Club	Season	League			Cup		Other		Total	
Club	Season	Division	Apps	Goals	Apps	Goals	Apps	Goals	Apps	Goals
Malavan	2024–25	Persian Gulf Pro League	1	0	0	0	0	0	1	0
Career total			1	0	0	0	0	0	1	0
