= Nick Schmidt =

Japanese footballer (born 2007)

Nick Schmidt ニック・シュミット
Personal information
- Full name: Nick Schmidt
- Date of birth: 12 September 2007 (age 19)
- Place of birth: Kiel, Germany
- Height: 1.80 m (5 ft 11 in)
- Position: Midfielder

Team information
- Current team: FC St. Pauli
- Number: 44

Youth career
- –2025: FC St. Pauli

Senior career*
Years	Team	Apps	(Gls)
2024–	FC St. Pauli II	39	(1)
2025–	FC St. Pauli	0	(0)

International career^{‡}
2024	Japan U18	3	(0)
2024–	Japan U20	2	(0)
- * Club domestic league appearances and goals as of 22 September 2026 ‡ National team caps and goals as of 30 March 2025

Nick Schmidt (ニック・シュミット, Nikku Shumitto; born 12 September 2007) is a professional footballer who plays as a midfielder for FC St. Pauli. Born in Germany, he is a Japan youth international.

== Early life ==
Schmidt was born on 9 March 2005 in Kiel, Germany, to a Japanese mother and a German father. He started playing football at the age of three.

== Club career ==
As a youth player, Schmidt joined the youth academy of German side FC St. Pauli and was promoted to the club's senior team ahead of the 2025–26 season.

== International career ==
Schmidt is a Japan youth international. In February 2025, he played for the Japan national under-20 team at the 2025 AFC U-20 Asian Cup.
