= Hong Kong national under-20 football team =

National youth association football team

Hong Kong Under-20
- Association: Hong Kong Football Association
- Confederation: AFC (Asia)
- FIFA code: HKG
| First colours | Second colours |

AFC U-19 Championship
- Appearances: 16 (first in 1959)
- Best result: 3rd place (1960)

Hong Kong under-20 football team is a regional association football youth team of Hong Kong and is controlled by Football Association of Hong Kong, China.

== Competition history ==
=== AFC U-20 Championship ===
| Year | Result | M | W | D | L | GF | GA |
|---|---|---|---|---|---|---|---|
| (Malaysia) 1959 | Group stage | 4 | 1 | 0 | 3 | 4 | 15 |
| (Malaysia) 1960 | Did not enter | | | | | | |
| (Thailand) 1961 | Did not enter | | | | | | |
| (Thailand) 1962 | Group stage | 4 | 2 | 0 | 2 | 7 | 8 |
| (Malaysia) 1963 | Third place | 6 | 4 | 1 | 1 | 17 | 6 |
| (South Vietnam) 1964 | Did not enter | | | | | | |
| (Japan) 1965 | Fourth place | 6 | 3 | 0 | 3 | 8 | 10 |
| (Philippines) 1966 | Group stage | 4 | 1 | 1 | 2 | 8 | 14 |
| (Thailand) 1967 | Group stage | 3 | 0 | 0 | 3 | 5 | 12 |
| (South Korea) 1968 | Group stage | 3 | 0 | 2 | 1 | 3 | 6 |
| (Thailand) 1969 | Group stage | 3 | 1 | 0 | 2 | 6 | 11 |
| (Philippines) 1970 | Quarter-finals | 4 | 3 | 1 | 0 | 9 | 2 |
| (Japan) 1971 | Group stage | 3 | 0 | 0 | 3 | 1 | 6 |
| (Thailand) 1972 | Group stage | 4 | 1 | 1 | 2 | 15 | 7 |
| (Iran) 1973 | Group stage | 2 | 1 | 0 | 1 | 2 | 4 |
| (Thailand) 1974 | Quarter-finals | 4 | 0 | 3 | 1 | 3 | 6 |
| (Kuwait) 1975 | Quarter-finals | 5 | 2 | 0 | 3 | 5 | 6 |
| (Thailand) 1976 | Group stage | 3 | 1 | 0 | 2 | 2 | 11 |
| (Iran) 1977 | Group stage | 2 | 0 | 0 | 2 | 1 | 8 |
| (South Korea) 1978 | Did not qualify | | | | | | |
| (South Korea) 1980 | Did not qualify | | | | | | |
| (Thailand) 1982 | Did not qualify | | | | | | |
| (United Arab Emirates) 1985 | Did not qualify | | | | | | |
| (Saudi Arabia) 1986 | Did not qualify | | | | | | |
| (Qatar) 1988 | Did not qualify | | | | | | |
| (Indonesia) 1990 | Did not qualify | | | | | | |
| (United Arab Emirates) 1992 | Did not qualify | | | | | | |
| (Indonesia) 1994 | Did not qualify | | | | | | |
| (South Korea) 1996 | Did not qualify | | | | | | |
| (Thailand) 1998 | Did not qualify | | | | | | |
| (Iran) 2000 | Did not qualify | | | | | | |
| (Qatar) 2002 | Did not qualify | | | | | | |
| (Malaysia) 2004 | Did not qualify | | | | | | |
| (India) 2006 | Did not qualify | | | | | | |
| (Saudi Arabia) 2008 | Did not qualify | | | | | | |
| (China) 2010 | Did not qualify | | | | | | |
| (United Arab Emirates) 2012 | Did not qualify | | | | | | |
| (Myanmar) 2014 | Did not qualify | | | | | | |
| (Bahrain) 2016 | Did not qualify | | | | | | |
| (Indonesia) 2018 | Did not qualify | | | | | | |
| (Uzbekistan) 2023 | Did not qualify | | | | | | |
| (China) 2025 | Did not qualify | | | | | | |
| (China) 2027 | Did not qualify | | | | | | |
| Total | 16/42 | 60 | 20 | 9 | 31 | 96 | 132 |

== Recent results and fixtures ==
=== 2026 ===
| 4 July Friendly | Myanmar | 2–0 | Hong Kong | Yangon, Myanmar |
| 16:00 UTC+6:30 | | | | Stadium: Thuwunna Stadium |

| 7 July Friendly | Myanmar | 2–0 | Hong Kong | Yangon, Myanmar |
| 16:00 UTC+6:30 | | | | Stadium: Thuwunna Stadium |

| 31 August 2027 AFC U-20 ACQ | Saudi Arabia | 2–0 | Hong Kong | Doha, Qatar |
| 19:00 UTC+3 | Suhayb 26'; Al Obeidi 45+1' (pen.) | Report | | Stadium: Suheim bin Hamad Stadium; Referee: Ammar Abo Alo (Syria) |

| 3 September 2027 AFC U-20 ACQ | Hong Kong | 0–3 | Qatar | Doha, Qatar |
| 19:00 UTC+3 | | Report | Al Sayed 10'; Ali 17'; Mohamed 45+1' | Stadium: Abdullah bin Khalifa Stadium; Referee: Ngô Duy Lân (Vietnam) |

| 6 September 2027 AFC U-20 ACQ | Oman | 1–1 | Hong Kong | Doha, Qatar |
| 19:00 UTC+3 | Al Alawi 84' | Report | Cheung Yiu Hin 58' | Stadium: Suheim bin Hamad Stadium; Referee: Seyed Vahid Kazemi (Iran) |

== Coaching staff ==
| Position | Name |
|---|---|
| Head coach | |
| Executive Manager | (Hong Kong) Graeme Chan |
| Assistant coach | (South Africa) Chancy Cooke |
| Goalkeeper coach | (Hong Kong) Fan Chun Yip |
| Head of Sports Science | (England) Mathew Pears |
| Head of Performance Analysis | (Republic of Ireland) Christopher Jenkins |
| Team Doctor | (Hong Kong) Wan Hay Man Keith |
| Equipment Team | (Hong Kong) Cheung Tim Ho Andrew |
| Equipment Team | (Hong Kong) Samuel Chow |
| Physiotherapist | (Hong Kong) Lo Ho Cheung |
| Physiotherapist | (Hong Kong) Kwong Hoi Hang Karen |
| Physiotherapist | (Hong Kong) Leung Hok Hin Frankie |

== Current squad ==
The following 23 players were named in the final squad for the AFC U-20 Asian Cup qualifiers held in Qatar from 31 August to 6 September 2026.

Bold denote players who have been capped for the senior team. Names in italics denote players who have been capped by Hong Kong in a higher age group.

| No. | Pos. | Player | Date of birth (age) | Caps | Goals | Club |
|---|---|---|---|---|---|---|
| | GK | James Wright | 29 July 2007 (age 19) | | | (The Football Association) Alfreton Town |
| | GK | Hui Pak Wai | 18 July 2008 (age 18) | | | (Football Association of Hong Kong, China) Southern |
| | GK | Kwong Tin Lok | 4 October 2007 (age 18) | | | (Football Association of Hong Kong, China) Kowloon City |
| | DF | Cheung Ching Wan | 19 January 2007 (age 19) | | | (Football Association of Hong Kong, China) Rangers |
| | DF | Lau Yat Laam | 1 August 2009 (age 17) | | | (Football Association of Hong Kong, China) Rangers |
| | DF | Leung Yik Lai | 12 July 2007 (age 19) | | | (Football Association of Hong Kong, China) Eastern District |
| | DF | Liang Kui Chung | 25 April 2008 (age 18) | | | (Football Association of Hong Kong, China) Kitchee |
| | DF | Yu Ching Wai | 25 September 2007 (age 18) | | | (Football Association of Hong Kong, China) Kitchee |
| | DF | Fung Tin Wing | 29 April 2008 (age 18) | | | (Football Association of Hong Kong, China) Kowloon City |
| | DF | Wong Hiu Laam | 13 November 2007 (age 18) | | | (Football Association of Hong Kong, China) Kowloon City |
| | DF | Calum Bloxham | 28 February 2007 (age 19) | | | (Football Association of Hong Kong, China) HKFC |
| | DF | Jim Ho Chun | 2 February 2007 (age 19) | | | (Football Association of Hong Kong, China) HKFC |
| | DF | Lee Ching | 12 June 2007 (age 19) | | | (Football Association of Hong Kong, China) Southern |
| | MF | Chin Yu Ho | 13 February 2008 (age 18) | | | (Portuguese Football Federation) Oriental U19 |
| | MF | Chan Shing Chun | 5 February 2007 (age 19) | | | (Football Association of Hong Kong, China) Kitchee |
| | MF | Lin Long Tik | 21 January 2008 (age 18) | | | (Football Association of Hong Kong, China) Kowloon City |
| | MF | Jing Yung Chun | 3 December 2008 (age 17) | | | (Royal Belgian Football Association) KRC Mechelen |
| | FW | Owen Cheung | 6 September 2007 (age 19) | | | (Football Association of Hong Kong, China) Rangers |
| | FW | Ma Yung Sung | 29 December 2007 (age 18) | | | (Football Association of Hong Kong, China) Rangers |
| | FW | Joshua Baker | 5 October 2009 (age 16) | | | (United States Soccer Federation) Black Rock FC |
| | FW | Cheung Yiu Hin | 18 June 2008 (age 18) | | | (Football Association of Hong Kong, China) Kitchee |
| | FW | Li Siu Hin | 4 January 2008 (age 18) | | | (Football Association of Hong Kong, China) Kitchee |
| | FW | Fok Jun Hei | 27 February 2007 (age 19) | | | (United Arab Emirates Football Association) Dubai Irish |

=== Recent call-ups ===
The following players have been called up for the team within the previous 12 months.

| Pos. | Player | Date of birth (age) | Caps | Goals | Club | Latest call-up |
|---|---|---|---|---|---|---|
| GK | Cheung Lap Hang | 16 December 2008 (age 17) | | | (England) Royal Russell School | |
| GK | Tuscany Shek | 25 December 2007 (age 18) | | | (Hong Kong) Kitchee | |
| GK | Tang Pui Chun | 13 February 2009 (age 17) | | | (Hong Kong) Kitchee | |
| DF | Sin Wai Kiu | 18 March 2008 (age 18) | | | (Hong Kong) Kitchee | |
| DF | Chan Yin Hei | 4 May 2007 (age 19) | | | (Hong Kong) Eastern District | |
| DF | Milos Wong | 26 March 2009 (age 17) | | | (Hong Kong) Rangers | |
| DF | Lam Pak Yin | 4 October 2008 (age 17) | | | (Hong Kong) Kitchee | |
| DF | Siu Ching | 28 April 2008 (age 18) | | | (Hong Kong) Eastern | |
| DF | Uriel Conteiro | 17 November 2009 (age 16) | | | (Hong Kong) Eastern | |
| DF | Fung Tsz Hin | 14 February 2007 (age 19) | | | Free Agent | |
| MF | Emilio Migliorelli | 19 November 2007 (age 18) | | | (Spain) Rayo Ciudad Alcobendas U19 | |
| MF | Lau Yin Hong | 2 January 2007 (age 19) | | | (Hong Kong) Rangers | |
| MF | Jay Marc Chan | 14 September 2009 (age 17) | | | (Spain) CD Libertad Alcorcón U19 | |
| MF | Max Chan | 10 May 2007 (age 19) | | | (Hong Kong) HKFC | |
| MF | Chong Tsun | 7 December 2008 (age 17) | | | (Hong Kong) KC Southern | |
| MF | Hui Siu Chung | 10 May 2007 (age 19) | | | (Hong Kong) Lee Man | |
| MF | Tsui Long | 15 February 2007 (age 19) | | | (Hong Kong) North District | |
| MF | Poson Liu | | | | (England) Queen Ethelburga's Collegiate | |
| FW | Wong To Lam | 13 September 2007 (age 19) | | | (Spain) CD San Roque de Lepe | |
| FW | Pang Hing Hei | 6 March 2007 (age 19) | | | (Hong Kong) Eastern District | |
| FW | Yiu Tsz Leong | 26 September 2008 (age 17) | | | (Hong Kong) Kitchee | |
| FW | Gao Ming Ho | 7 April 2008 (age 18) | | | (Hong Kong) Eastern | |
| FW | Wong Yat Hin | 24 February 2009 (age 17) | | | (Japan) Yamagata Meisei High School | |
| FW | Leung Tsz Yin | 21 January 2009 (age 17) | | | (Hong Kong) Eastern | |
^{INJ} Player withdrew from the squad due to an injury^{PRE} Preliminary squad^{WD} Player withdrawn from the squad.^{RET} Player retired from international football

== See also ==
- Hong Kong national football team
- Hong Kong national under-23 football team
- Hong Kong national under-17 football team
- Football Association of Hong Kong, China
- Football in Hong Kong
- Sport in Hong Kong
- Hong Kong
