= Khabul Baatar =

Mongolian footballer (born 2008)

Khabul Baatar Хабул Баатар
Personal information
- Date of birth: 30 November 2008 (age 17)
- Place of birth: Ulaanbaatar, Mongolia
- Height: 1.77 m (5 ft 10 in)
- Position: Midfielder

Team information
- Current team: Hércules

Youth career
- –2025: SP Falcons
- 2022–2025: Millfield
- 2025–2026: Brooke House College

Senior career*
Years	Team	Apps	(Gls)
2025–2026	SP Falcons		
2026–	Hércules	0	(0)

International career^{‡}
2024–	Mongolia U17	3	(0)
2025–	Mongolia U23	3	(0)
2026–	Mongolia	1	(0)
- * Club domestic league appearances and goals as of 01:52, 9 July 2026 (UTC) ‡ National team caps and goals as of 01:52, 9 July 2026 (UTC)

Khabul Baatar (Mongolian: Хабул Баатар; born 30 November 2008) is a Mongolian footballer who plays as a midfielder for Primera Federación club Hércules CF and the Mongolian national team.

== Club career ==
Born in Ulaanbaatar, Baatar came up through the youth system of SP Falcons. He was granted a global talent visa by the United Kingdom and began attending Millfield in 2022. During school breaks, Baatar continued to play for SP Falcons, making his senior debut for the club on 13 April 2025 in a Mongolian Premier League match against Tuv Azarganuud FC. Following three years at Millfield, the player transferred to Brooke House College Football Academy in 2025. Later that year, he went on a three-week trial with Cruzeiro of Brazil's Campeonato Brasileiro Série A. By summer 2026, Baatar had joined Hércules CF of Spain's Primera Federación.

== International career ==
At the youth level, Baatar represented Mongolia in 2025 AFC U-17 Asian Cup qualification. He appeared in all three of Mongolia's matches. He then competed for the nation in 2026 AFC U-23 Asian Cup qualification. He received his first senior international call-up in May 2026 for friendlies against Singapore and Hong Kong. He went on to debut on 31 May 2026 in the match against Singapore, coming on as a second-half substitute for Dölgöön Amaraa.

== Career statistics ==
=== International ===
As of match played 31 May 2026

Mongolia
Year	Apps	Goals
2026	1	0
Total	1	0
