= 2022 Arab Cup U-20 squads =

The 2022 Arab Cup U-20 is an international youth football tournament held in Saudi Arabia from 20 July to 6 August 2022. The 18 national teams involved in the tournament were required to register a squad of 23 players, including three goalkeepers. Only players in these squads were eligible to take part in the tournament. Players born on or after 1 January 2002 are eligible to participate.

The age listed for each player is on 20 July 2022, the first day of the tournament. The numbers of caps and goals listed for each player do not include any matches played after the start of the tournament. The club listed is the club for which the player last played a competitive match prior to the tournament. (Note: This is the club a player was last able to play for during the previous season in the event a player did not play a competitive match.) The nationality for each club reflects the national association (not the league) to which the club is affiliated. A flag is included for coaches who are of a different nationality than their own national team.

== Group A ==
=== Saudi Arabia ===
Coach: Saleh Al-Mohammadi

No.	Pos.	Player	Date of birth (age)	Club
1	GK	Bilal Al-Dawaa	12 June 2004 (aged 18)	(Saudi Arabian Football Federation) Al-Ettifaq
2	DF	Ahmed Al-Jelidan	8 March 2004 (aged 18)	(Saudi Arabian Football Federation) Al-Fateh
3	DF	Mohammed Al-Dawsari	31 March 2003 (aged 19)	(Saudi Arabian Football Federation) Al-Hilal
4	DF	Mohammed Sulaiman	8 April 2004 (aged 18)	(Saudi Arabian Football Federation) Al-Ahli
5	DF	Waleed Ayash	22 April 2004 (aged 18)	(Saudi Arabian Football Federation) Al-Nassr
6	MF	Faisal Al-Sibyani	7 July 2003 (aged 19)	(Saudi Arabian Football Federation) Al-Ahli
7	MF	Abdulaziz Al-Aliwah	11 February 2004 (aged 18)	(Saudi Arabian Football Federation) Al-Nassr
8	MF	Abdullah Al-Zaid	8 January 2004 (aged 18)	(Saudi Arabian Football Federation) Al-Hilal
9	FW	Abdullah Radif	20 January 2003 (aged 19)	(Saudi Arabian Football Federation) Al-Hilal
10	MF	Musab Al-Juwayr	20 June 2003 (aged 19)	(Saudi Arabian Football Federation) Al-Hilal
11	MF	Yaseen Al-Zubaidi	26 April 2003 (aged 19)	(Saudi Arabian Football Federation) Al-Ahli
12	DF	Salem Al-Najdi	17 January 2003 (aged 19)	(Saudi Arabian Football Federation) Al-Fateh
13	MF	Abdulmalik Al-Oyayari	10 November 2003 (aged 18)	(Saudi Arabian Football Federation) Al-Taawoun
14	DF	Abdulaziz Al-Faraj	23 June 2003 (aged 19)	(Saudi Arabian Football Federation) Al-Nassr
15	MF	Mohammed Al-Marri	14 July 2003 (aged 19)	(Saudi Arabian Football Federation) Al-Qadsiah
17	MF	Saleh Al-Rahmani	3 April 2003 (aged 19)	(Saudi Arabian Football Federation) Al-Faisaly
19	FW	Yazeed Joshan	4 May 2003 (aged 19)	(Saudi Arabian Football Federation) Al-Faisaly
20	FW	Meshari Al-Nemer	5 August 2003 (aged 18)	(Saudi Arabian Football Federation) Al-Nassr
21	GK	Osama Al-Mermesh	6 July 2003 (aged 19)	(Saudi Arabian Football Federation) Al-Ittihad
22	GK	Hamed Al-Shanqiti	26 April 2005 (aged 17)	(Saudi Arabian Football Federation) Al-Shabab
23	MF	Abdullah Al-Enezi	19 January 2003 (aged 19)	(Saudi Arabian Football Federation) Al-Fateh
24	FW	Thamer Al-Shahrani	23 March 2003 (aged 19)	(Saudi Arabian Football Federation) Damac
25	DF	Suwailem Al-Menhali	17 April 2004 (aged 18)	(Saudi Arabian Football Federation) Al-Ittihad

=== Iraq ===
Coach: Emad Mohammed

No.	Pos.	Player	Date of birth (age)	Caps	Goals	Club
		Ali Abbas Mohesin		0	0	(Iraq Football Association) Amanat Baghdad
		Haider Abdulkareem		0	0	(Iraq Football Association) Al-Zawra'a
		Ismail Ahmed		0	0	(Iraq Football Association) Newroz
		Sajjad Alaa	3 May 2003 (age 23)	0	0	(Iraq Football Association) Al-Mina'a
		Hussein Ali Lateef		0	0	(Iraq Football Association) Al-Naft
	FW	Abdulqadir Ayoub		0	0	(Iraq Football Association) Erbil
	MF	Amir Hassan		0	0	(Iraq Football Association) Al-Najaf
	FW	Blnd Hassan	12 August 2003 (age 23)	0	0	(Royal Dutch Football Association) De Graafschap
	GK	Hussein Hassan	15 November 2002 (age 23)	0	0	(Iraq Football Association) Al-Karkh
		Mohammed Jameel		0	0	(Iraq Football Association) Al-Sinaat Al-Kahrabaiya
	GK	Ahmed Khalid		0	0	(Iraq Football Association) Naft Maysan
	DF	Abbas Majid	1 October 2003 (age 22)	0	0	(Iraq Football Association) Al-Talaba
		Abbas Manie		0	0	(Iraq Football Association) Amanat Baghdad
	DF	Sajjad Mohammed		0	0	(Iraq Football Association) Al-Zawra'a
	DF	Sajjad Mohammed Mahdi		0	0	(Iraq Football Association) Naft Maysan
		Muslim Mousa		0	0	(Iraq Football Association) Al-Mina'a
		Ameen Naby		0	0	(Iraq Football Association) Erbil
	MF	Abdul-Razzak Qasim	5 April 2002 (age 24)	0	0	(Iraq Football Association) Al-Shorta
	MF	Kadhem Raad Hatem	28 March 2003 (age 23)	0	0	(Iraq Football Association) Al-Quwa Al-Jawiya
		Abboud Rabah		0	0	(Iraq Football Association) Al-Qasim
	DF	Ali Sadiq		0	0	(Iraq Football Association) Al-Zawra'a
		Ali Shakhwan		0	0	(Iraq Football Association) Erbil
		Omran Zaky		0	0	(Iraq Football Association) Zakho

=== Mauritania ===
Coach:

== Group B ==
=== United Arab Emirates ===
Coach:

=== Jordan ===
Coach:

=== Yemen ===
Coach:

== Group C ==
=== Algeria ===
Coach: Mohamed Lacete

No.	Pos.	Player	Date of birth (age)	Caps	Goals	Club
	GK	Oussama Mellala	29 May 2003 (age 23)	0	0	(Algerian Football Federation) MC Alger
	GK	Chemseddine Radaoui		0	0	(Algerian Football Federation) ES Sétif
		Mohammed Achraf Kaddouri		0	0	(Algerian Football Federation) JS Saoura
	DF	Rafik Messali	28 April 2003 (age 23)	0	0	(French Football Federation) Toulouse FC
	DF	Rayane Dehilis	14 March 2003 (age 23)	0	0	(French Football Federation) O. Marseille
	MF	Abdelkrim Naamani	13 May 2003 (age 23)	0	0	(Algerian Football Federation) USM Alger
		Abdeljalil Ould Amar		0	0	(Algerian Football Federation) JS Kabylie
9	FW	Jorès Raho	2 February 2003 (age 23)	0	0	(French Football Federation) O. Marseille
	DF	Yassine Ben Hamed	24 March 2003 (age 23)	0	0	(Royal Belgian Football Association) Royal Antwerp
		Rayane Gacem		0	0	(Algerian Football Federation) NA Hussein Dey
		Aymene Fellahi		0	0	(Algerian Football Federation) ES Sétif
	FW	Islam Benyezli	16 June 2003 (age 23)	0	0	(Algerian Football Federation) JS Saoura
	FW	Rafik Mohamed Omar	10 January 2004 (age 22)	0	0	(Algerian Football Federation) FAF Academy
	MF	Amine Benkaddour		0	0	(Algerian Football Federation) RC Relizane
	DF	Kamel Charchour	24 January 2003 (age 23)	0	0	(Algerian Football Federation) MC Alger
	DF	Reda Aissaoui	6 August 2003 (age 23)	0	0	(Italian Football Federation) Parma
	DF	Mehdi Touenti	25 March 2003 (age 23)	0	0	(Royal Spanish Football Federation) FC Cartagena
	MF	Stan Berkani	13 August 2003 (age 23)	0	0	(French Football Federation) Clermont
	MF	Oussama Amar	23 August 2003 (age 23)	0	0	(Royal Spanish Football Federation) Valencia CF
	MF	Massil Adjaoudi	11 June 2003 (age 23)	0	0	(Italian Football Federation) Lazio
	MF	Affari Belhadj Chekal	5 March 2003 (age 23)	0	0	(Algerian Football Federation) CS Constantine
	FW	Mohamed Messaoud Salem	3 July 2003 (age 23)	0	0	(Algerian Football Federation) ES Sétif
		Abdessamad Bounacer		0	0	(Algerian Football Federation) USM Alger

=== Libya ===
Coach:

=== Lebanon ===
Coach: Bilal Fleifel

No.	Pos.	Player	Date of birth (age)	Club
	GK	Shareef Azaki		(Lebanese Football Association) Ahed
	GK	Anthony Maassry		(French Football Federation) Sochaux
	GK	Rami Mjalli		
	DF	Ibrahim Chami		(Canadian Soccer Association) FC Laval
	DF	Saad Chweiki		(Lebanese Football Association) Sporting
	DF	Ali Rida Ismail		(Lebanese Football Association) Nejmeh
	DF	Ziad Jamaleddine		(Lebanese Football Association) Ansar
	DF	Mohamad Al Moussawi		(Lebanese Football Association) Ahed
	DF	Hsein Hassan Reda		(Lebanese Football Association) Ahed
	DF	Houssein Abbas Rida		
	MF	Hussein Bajouk		(Lebanese Football Association) Mabarra
	MF	Ali El Fadl		(Lebanese Football Association) Shabab Sahel
	MF	Oscar Ghantous		(Royal Spanish Football Federation) Ciudad de Murcia
	MF	Abbas Karnib		(Football Australia) Northbridge Bulls FC
	MF	Ali Alakbar Mannaa		(Lebanese Football Association) Ahed
	MF	Mohamad Safwan		(Lebanese Football Association) Akhaa Ahli Aley
	MF	Mahmoud Zbib		(Lebanese Football Association) Ahed
	FW	Omar Bahlawan		(Lebanese Football Association) Ansar
	FW	Mohamad Jaafar		(Lebanese Football Association) Shabab Sahel
	FW	Shadi Jouni		(Lebanese Football Association) Ahed
	FW	Ali Kassas		(Lebanese Football Association) Nejmeh
	FW	Mohamad Sadek		(Lebanese Football Association) Bourj
	FW	Mohammad Serdah		(Lebanese Football Association) Chabab Ghazieh

== Group D ==
=== Egypt ===
Coach:

=== Somalia ===
Coach:

=== Oman ===
Coach:

== Group E ==
=== Tunisia ===
Coach:

=== Djibouti ===
Coach:

=== Bahrain ===
Coach:

== Group F ==
=== Morocco ===
Coach: لاعبين باقل من 18 سنة

=== Palestine ===
Coach: Husam Younis

No.	Pos.	Player	Date of birth (age)	Club
	GK	Mahmoud Al-Tibi		(Palestinian Football Association) Khadamat Al Shatea
	GK	Karim Sheikh Qassem		(French Football Federation) Metz
	DF	Khaled Abu Al-Heija	13 November 2005 (age 20)	(German Football Association) Carl Zeiss Jena
	DF	Jamal Al-Badarin	6 June 2003 (age 23)	(Bulgarian Football Union) Botev Plovdiv
	DF	Yousef Al Shubasi		(The Football Association) Brentford
	DF	Amr Rizk		(Palestinian Football Association) Gaza Sporting Club
		Muhannad Abu Lehiya		(Palestinian Football Association)
	MF	Monir Al Badarin	8 July 2005 (age 21)	(Bulgarian Football Union) Botev Plovdiv
	MF	Muayyad Awad		(Palestinian Football Association) Shabab Al Ubeidiya
	MF	Mahdi Fatahi	15 August 2003 (age 23)	(Danish Football Association) Næstved Boldklub
	MF	Qais Al-Hattab		(Palestinian Football Association) Shabab Al-Dhahiriya
	MF	Muhannad Hassanein		(Palestinian Football Association) Khidmat Rafah
	MF	Mohammad Shaltef		(Palestinian Football Association) Al-Bireh Institute
	MF	Yazan Sharhah		(Palestinian Football Association) Thaqafi Tulkarem
	MF	Wael Safi		(Palestinian Football Association) Shabab Al Ubeidiya
	MF	Mohammad Sundoqa		(Palestinian Football Association) Hilal Al-Quds
	MF	Qais Taha		(Palestinian Football Association) Thaqafi Tulkarem
		Esslam Al-Kafafi	5 January 2003 (age 23)	(Swedish Football Association) KSF Prespa Birlik
	FW	Wissam Bakkar		(German Football Association) Berliner AK 07
	FW	Danny Derbas	7 April 2004 (age 22)	(Swedish Football Association) Degerfors IF
	FW	Mohammad Mahmoud	13 February 2005 (age 21)	(German Football Association) VfL Bochum
	FW	Ahmed Shedeed		(Palestinian Football Association) Ahli Al-Khaleel

=== Sudan ===
Coach:
