= 2022 Arab Cup U-20 =

كأس العرب للمنتخبات تحت 20 سنة

Tournament details
- Host country: Saudi Arabia
- Dates: 20 July – 7 August
- Teams: 18 (from 2 confederations)
- Venues: 2 (in 1 host city)

Final positions
- Champions: Saudi Arabia (3rd title)
- Runners-up: Egypt

Tournament statistics
- Matches played: 25
- Goals scored: 72 (2.88 per match)
- Top scorer(s): (Saudi Arabia) Abdullah Radif (6 goals)
- Best player: (Saudi Arabia) Musab Al-Juwayr
- Best goalkeeper: (Egypt) Ahmed Nader

The 2022 Arab Cup U-20 was the eighth edition of the Arab Cup U-20. On 14 April 2022, the Union of Arab Football Associations granted Saudi Arabia the right to host. The tournament took place from 20 July to 7 August.

Saudi Arabia were the defending champions, having won the previous edition in 2021. Saudi Arabia successfully defended their title by beating Egypt in the final.

== Teams ==
The draw took place on 26 June 2022 in Dammam, Saudi Arabia.

Team	Appearance	Last appearance	Previous best performance
Algeria	5th	2021	Runners-up
Bahrain	3rd	2020	Quarter-finals
Djibouti	3rd	2021	Group stage
Egypt	4th	2021	Semi-finals
Iraq	5th	2021	Quarter-finals
Jordan	2nd	2012	Group stage
Lebanon	2nd	2021	Group stage
Libya	3rd	2020	Third-place
Mauritania	3rd	2021	Group stage
Morocco	5th	2021	Winners
Oman	1st	Debut	
Palestine	3rd	2020	Group stage
Saudi Arabia	5th	2021	Winners
Somalia	1st	Debut	
Sudan	4th	2020	Group stage
Tunisia	4th	2021	Winners
United Arab Emirates	2nd	2021	Group stage
Yemen	2nd	2021	Group stage

Comoros, Kuwait, Qatar and Syria did not enter. In addition, there are no invited teams in this edition.

=== Seedings ===
Pot 1	Pot 2	Pot 3
1. Saudi Arabia (hosts); 2. Morocco; 3. Egypt; 4. Tunisia; 5. Algeria; 6. United Arab Emirates	7. Iraq; 8. Oman; 9. Bahrain; 10. Jordan; 11. Lebanon; 12. Palestine	13. Mauritania; 14. Libya; 15. Sudan; 16. Yemen; 17. Djibouti; 18. Somalia

== Venues ==
Cities	Venues	Capacity
Abha	Prince Sultan bin Abdul Aziz Stadium	20,000
Abha	Damac Club Stadium	5,000

== Officiating ==
Referees

- (Algeria) Youssef Qamouh
- (Bahrain) Mohammad Khaled
- (Egypt) Mohamed Maarouf
- (Iraq) Yousif Saeed
- (Jordan) Saddam Amara
- (Kuwait) Abdullah Al-Kandari
- (Lebanon) Sheikh Ahmed Aladdin
- (Libya) Mohamed Al-Shahome
- (Morocco) Jalal Jayed
- (Mauritania) Abdel Aziz Mohamed Bouh
- (Oman) Omar Al-Yaqoubi
- (Qatar) Abdul Hadi Al-Ruwaili
- (Saudi Arabia) Sami Al-Jaris
- (Sudan) Abdulaziz Jaafar
- (Tunisia) Naïm Hosni
- (United Arab Emirates) Sultan Al-Hammadi

Assistant referees

- (Algeria) Ayan Adel
- (Djibouti) Abdullah Sharma
- (Egypt) Sami Helhal
- (Lebanon) Ali Fakih
- (Libya) Mohamed Al-Araibi
- (Mauritania) Mohamed Mahmoud Youssef
- (Morocco) Abdullah Abrat
- (Oman) Abdullah Al-Jerdani
- (Palestine) Ashraf Abu Zubaydah
- (Saudi Arabia) Hisham Al-Rifai
- (Syria) Rami Tohme
- (Tunisia) Faouzi Jeridi
- (United Arab Emirates) Masoud Hassan
- (Yemen) Ibrahim Saleh Hosni

== Squads ==
Players born on or after 1 January 2002 are eligible to participate.

== Group stage ==
The group winners and the two best second-placed teams advance to the quarter-finals.

=== Group A ===
Pos	Team	Pld	W	D	L	GF	GA	GD	Pts	Qualification
1	Saudi Arabia (H)	2	2	0	0	6	1	+5	6	Advance to knockout stage
2	Mauritania	2	1	0	1	1	2	−1	3	
3	Iraq	2	0	0	2	1	5	−4	0	

Source: UAFA
(H) Hosts
20 July 2022
17:00

Saudi Arabia	2–0	Mauritania
Al-Oyayari 5'; Radif 15'	Report

Prince Sultan bin Abdul Aziz Stadium, Abha
Referee: Omar Al-Yaqoubi (Oman)

23 July 2022
21:00

Mauritania	1–0	Iraq
Cissé 67'

Damac Club Stadium, Abha
Referee: Abdulaziz Jaafar (Sudan)

26 July 2022
17:00

Iraq	1–4	Saudi Arabia
Rabah 33'		Radif 9', 80' (pen.) 35'; Al-Juwayr 31'

Prince Sultan bin Abdul Aziz Stadium, Abha
Attendance: 5,107
Referee: Youssef Qamouh (Algeria)

=== Group B ===
Pos	Team	Pld	W	D	L	GF	GA	GD	Pts	Qualification
1	Jordan	2	1	1	0	2	1	+1	4	Advance to knockout stage
2	Yemen	2	1	0	1	3	2	+1	3	Advance to knockout stage
3	United Arab Emirates	2	0	1	1	2	4	−2	1	

Source: UAFA
20 July 2022
21:00

United Arab Emirates	1–1	Jordan
Subait 90+4' (pen.)	Report	Al-Shanaineh 45+1'

Damac Club Stadium, Abha
Referee: Jalal Jayed (Morocco)

23 July 2022
17:00

Jordan	1–0	Yemen
Hassan 64'	Report

Prince Sultan bin Abdul Aziz Stadium, Abha
Attendance: 6,720
Referee: Naim Hosni (Tunisia)

26 July 2022
21:00

Yemen	3–1	United Arab Emirates
Mahrous 44'; Al Shami 59'; Mahdi 80'	Report	Khalil 78'

Damac Club Stadium, Abha
Attendance: 4,053
Referee: Mohamed Maarouf (Egypt)

=== Group C ===
Pos	Team	Pld	W	D	L	GF	GA	GD	Pts	Qualification
1	Algeria	2	2	0	0	5	2	+3	6	Advance to knockout stage
2	Libya	2	1	0	1	3	3	0	3	
3	Lebanon	2	0	0	2	1	4	−3	0	

Source: UAFA
21 July 2022
17:00

Algeria	2–1	Lebanon
Adjaoudi 23'; Ben Hamed 39'	Report	Bahlawan 83'

Prince Sultan bin Abdul Aziz Stadium, Abha
Referee: Sultan Al-Hammadi (United Arab Emirates)

24 July 2022
21:00

Lebanon	0–2	Libya
	Report	Adil 70'; Bouchiba 84'

Damac Club Stadium, Abha
Referee: Mohammad Khaled (Bahrain)

27 July 2022
17:00

Libya	1–3	Algeria
Adil 48' (pen.)		Rahou 25'; Amar 72'; Akhrib 81'

Prince Sultan bin Abdul Aziz Stadium, Abha
Referee: Sami Al-Jaris (Saudi Arabia)

=== Group D ===
Pos	Team	Pld	W	D	L	GF	GA	GD	Pts	Qualification
1	Egypt	2	2	0	0	3	0	+3	6	Advance to knockout stage
2	Oman	2	1	0	1	2	1	+1	3	
3	Somalia	2	0	0	2	0	4	−4	0	

Source: UAFA
21 July 2022
21:00

Egypt	1–0	Oman
Hawash 43'	Report

Damac Club Stadium, Abha
Referee: Abdullah Al-Kandari (Kuwait)

24 July 2022
17:00

Oman	2–0	Somalia
Al-Marzouq 21'; Al-Balochi 90+2'	Report

Prince Sultan bin Abdul Aziz Stadium, Abha
Referee: Abdel Aziz Mohamed Bouh (Mauritania)

27 July 2022
21:00

Somalia	0–2	Egypt
	Report	Hassan 35'; Ibrahim 74'

Damac Club Stadium, Abha
Attendance: 3,715
Referee: Sheikh Ahmed Aladdin (Lebanon)

=== Group E ===
Pos	Team	Pld	W	D	L	GF	GA	GD	Pts	Qualification
1	Tunisia	2	2	0	0	9	0	+9	6	Advance to knockout stage
2	Bahrain	2	1	0	1	2	3	−1	3	
3	Djibouti	2	0	0	2	0	8	−8	0	

Source: UAFA
22 July 2022
17:00

Tunisia	3–0	Bahrain
Senana 45'; Derbali 62'; Abid 86'	Report

Prince Sultan bin Abdul Aziz Stadium, Abha
Referee: Sadam Omara (Jordan)

25 July 2022
21:00

Bahrain	2–0	Djibouti
Muhammed 14' (pen.); Diaa 17'

Damac Club Stadium, Abha
Referee: Yousif Saeed (Iraq)

28 July 2022
17:00

Djibouti	0–6	Tunisia
	Report	Dhaoui 24'; Abid 39', 88'; Sassi 60'; Bouchniba 69', 77'

Prince Sultan bin Abdul Aziz Stadium, Abha
Referee: Sultan Al-Hammadi (United Arab Emirates)

=== Group F ===
Pos	Team	Pld	W	D	L	GF	GA	GD	Pts	Qualification
1	Morocco	2	2	0	0	5	2	+3	6	Advance to knockout stage
2	Palestine	2	1	0	1	5	4	+1	3	Advance to knockout stage
3	Sudan	2	0	0	2	5	9	−4	0	

Source: UAFA
22 July 2022
21:00

Morocco	4–2	Sudan
Khalifi 32'; Soussi 36'; Akharaz 55'; Mimouni 73'		Jibril 18'; Khader 43'

Damac Club Stadium, Abha
Attendance: 4,200
Referee: Sheikh Ahmed Aladdin (Lebanon)

25 July 2022
17:00

Sudan	3–5	Palestine
Awad 41' (o.g.); Abdel Qader 49'; Jibril 68'	Report	Mahmoud 31'; Al Badarin 63' (pen.); Al-Hattab 83'; Sandouqa 90+2'; Derbas 90+7'

Prince Sultan bin Abdul Aziz Stadium, Abha
Referee: Mohamed Alshahome (Libya)

28 July 2022
21:00

Palestine	0–1	Morocco
	Report	Mimouni 84'

Damac Club Stadium, Abha
Referee: Omar Al-Yaqoubi (Oman)

=== Ranking of second-placed teams ===
Pos	Grp	Team	Pld	W	D	L	GF	GA	GD	Pts	Qualification
1	F	Palestine	2	1	0	1	5	4	+1	3	Advance to knockout stage
2	B	Yemen	2	1	0	1	3	2	+1	3	Advance to knockout stage
3	D	Oman	2	1	0	1	2	1	+1	3	
4	C	Libya	2	1	0	1	3	3	0	3	
5	E	Bahrain	2	1	0	1	2	3	−1	3	
6	A	Mauritania	2	1	0	1	1	2	−1	3	

Source: UAFA

== Knockout stage ==
=== Bracket ===
Quarter-finals
31 July — Abha (Prince Sultan bin Abdul Aziz)
Saudi Arabia (p)	0 (3)
Yemen	0 (1)
31 July — Abha (Damac)
Jordan	1 (4)
Palestine (p)	1 (5)
31 July — Abha (Prince Sultan bin Abdul Aziz)
Algeria	1
Tunisia	0
31 July — Abha (Damac)
Egypt	2
Morocco	1

Semi-finals
3 August — Abha (Prince Sultan bin Abdul Aziz)
Saudi Arabia	5
Palestine	0
3 August — Abha (Prince Sultan bin Abdul Aziz)
Algeria	1
Egypt	3

Final
7 August — Abha (Prince Sultan bin Abdul Aziz)
Saudi Arabia (p)	1 (5)
Egypt	1 (3)

=== Quarter-finals ===
31 July 2022
15:00

Jordan	1–1	Palestine
Dayyeh 41' (pen.)	Report	Sandouqa 8'
Penalties
Amro (penalty scored); Al-Mansoori (penalty scored); Raed (penalty scored); Dayyeh (penalty scored); Al-Mubaidin (penalty missed)	4–5	(penalty scored) Sandouqa; (penalty scored) Taha; (penalty scored) Abu Al-Heija; (penalty scored) Shaltaf; (penalty scored) Al Badarin

Damac Club Stadium, Abha
Referee: Abdulaziz Jaafar (Sudan)

31 July 2022
17:00

Saudi Arabia	0–0	Yemen
Penalties
Radif (penalty scored); Al-Juwayr (penalty scored); Al-Nemer (penalty missed); Al-Marri (penalty scored)	3–1	(penalty missed) Al Shami; (penalty missed) Ibrahim; (penalty missed) Balabel; (penalty scored) Mahdi

Prince Sultan bin Abdul Aziz Stadium, Abha
Referee: Jalal Jayed (Morocco)

31 July 2022
19:00

Egypt	2–1	Morocco
Hawash 32'; Basha 61'		Lyakoubi 23'

Damac Club Stadium, Abha
Referee: Sultan Al-Hammadi (United Arab Emirates)

31 July 2022
21:00

Algeria	1–0	Tunisia
Belhadj Chekal 34'

Prince Sultan bin Abdul Aziz Stadium, Abha
Referee: Sami Al-Jaris (Saudi Arabia)

=== Semi-finals ===
3 August 2022
16:30

Saudi Arabia	5–0	Palestine
Baker 36'; Radif 45', 65'; Al-Elewai 67'; Al Rahmani 87'

Prince Sultan bin Abdul Aziz Stadium, Abha
Referee: Mohamed Alshahome (Libya)

3 August 2022
21:00

Algeria	1–3	Egypt
Akhrib 69'		Basha 10'; Rashdan 40'; Ibrahim 76'

Prince Sultan bin Abdul Aziz Stadium, Abha
Referee: Mohammad Khaled (Bahrain)

=== Final ===
The match date was postponed for one day for unspecified reasons.

7 August 2022
19:30

Saudi Arabia	1–1 (a.e.t.)	Egypt
Al Elewai 45'	Report	Basha 49'
Penalties
Radif (penalty scored); Al-Juwayr (penalty scored); Al-Marri (penalty scored); Al-Zubaidi (penalty scored); Al-Oyayari (penalty scored)	5–3	(penalty scored) Hassan; (penalty missed) Fayed; (penalty scored) Rashdan; (penalty scored) El Saaiy

Prince Sultan bin Abdul Aziz Stadium, Abha
Attendance: 16,540
Referee: Jalal Jayed (Morocco)

== Statistics ==
=== Goalscorers ===
There were 72 goals scored in 25 matches, for an average of 2.88 goals per match.

6 goals

- (Saudi Arabia) Abdullah Radif

3 goals

- (Egypt) Salah Basha
- (Tunisia) Aziz Abid

2 goals

- (Algeria) Lahlou Akhrib
- (Egypt) Ahmed Hawash
- (Libya) Mohamed Adil
- (Morocco) Anas Mimouni
- (Palestine) Mohammad Sandouqa
- (Saudi Arabia) Abdulaziz Al-Elewai
- (Sudan) Amjad Issam Jibril
- (Tunisia) Raed Bouchniba

1 goal

- (Algeria) Massil Adjaoudi
- (Algeria) Oussama Amar
- (Algeria) Affari Belhadj Chekal
- (Algeria) Yassine Ben Hamed
- (Algeria) Jorès Rahou
- (Bahrain) Ahmed Diaa
- (Bahrain) Mubarak Muhammed
- (Egypt) Youssef Hassan
- (Egypt) Mohamed Ibrahim
- (Egypt) Omar Ibrahim
- (Egypt) Abdelrahman Rashdan
- (Iraq) Abboud Rabah
- (Jordan) Amin Al-Shanaineh
- (Jordan) Alaa Dayyeh
- (Jordan) Yousef Hassan
- (Lebanon) Omar Bahlawan
- (Libya) Abdel Maysir Bouchiba
- (Mauritania) Aala Houssein Cissé
- (Morocco) Mohammed Akharaz
- (Morocco) Yassine Khalifi
- (Morocco) Oussama Lyakoubi
- (Morocco) Abderahmane Soussi
- (Oman) Ali Al-Balochi
- (Oman) Sultan Badr Al-Marzouq
- (Palestine) Monir Al Badarin
- (Palestine) Qais Al-Hattab
- (Palestine) Danny Derbas
- (Palestine) Mohammad Mahmoud
- (Saudi Arabia) Musab Al-Juwayr
- (Saudi Arabia) Abdulmalik Al-Oyayari
- (Saudi Arabia) Saleh Al Rahmani
- (Saudi Arabia) Mohammed Baker
- (Sudan) Ahmed Ibrahim Abdel Qader
- (Sudan) Hamed Khader
- (Tunisia) Mohamed Wael Derbali
- (Tunisia) Mohamed Dhaoui
- (Tunisia) Zineddine Sassi
- (Tunisia) Youssef Senana
- (United Arab Emirates) Mohamed Khalil
- (United Arab Emirates) Hazza Subait
- (Yemen) Abdul Rahman Al Shami
- (Yemen) Mohmmed Mahdi
- (Yemen) Hamza Mahrous

1 own goal

- (Palestine) Muhammad Muayyad Awad (against Sudan)

== Broadcasting rights ==
Below the list of the broadcasting rights:

Country/Region	Broadcaster
Algeria	EPTV
Egypt	Nile Sport
Egypt	ONTime Sports
Iraq	Al Iraqiya Sports
Iraq	Al Rabiaa TV
Jordan	Jordan TV Sport
Kuwait	Kuwait Sports
Libya	Libya Sports
Mauritania	Mauritania Sports
Morocco	Arryadia
Oman	Oman Sports
Palestine	Palestine Sports
Qatar	Alkass Sports Channels
Saudi Arabia	KSA Sports
Saudi Arabia	Shahid
Sudan	Goan Sports
Sudan	Sudan Sports
Tunisia	Tunisia Sports
United Arab Emirates	AD Sports
United Arab Emirates	Dubai Sports
United Arab Emirates	Sharjah Sports
Yemen	Yemen TV
Yemen	Yemen Today
