= 2019–20 OGC Nice season =

Nice
2019–20 season
- President: Jean-Pierre Rivère
- Head coach: Patrick Vieira
- Stadium: Allianz Riviera
- Ligue 1: 5th
- Coupe de France: Round of 16
- Coupe de la Ligue: Round of 32
- Top goalscorer: League: Kasper Dolberg (11); All: Kasper Dolberg (11)
- Highest home attendance: 32,705 (vs Paris Saint-Germain, 18 October 2019)
- Lowest home attendance: 14,967 (vs Metz, 7 December 2019)
- Average home league attendance: 19,306
- Biggest win: Nice 4–1 Metz
- Biggest defeat: Nice 1–4 Paris Saint-Germain; Saint-Étienne 4–1 Nice
Home colours	Away colours	Third colours

The 2019–20 season was Olympique Gymnaste Club Nice's 93rd season in existence and the club's 18th consecutive season in the top flight of French football. In addition to the domestic league, Nice participated in this season's editions of the Coupe de France, and the Coupe de la Ligue. The season covered the period from 1 July 2019 to 30 June 2020.

== Players ==
=== Squad ===
As of 1 October 2019.

Note: Flags indicate national team as defined under FIFA eligibility rules; some limited exceptions apply. Players may hold more than one non-FIFA nationality.

No.	Pos.	Nation	Player
2	DF	FRA	Stanley Nsoki
3	DF	FRA	Gautier Lloris
4	DF	BRA	Dante (captain)
5	DF	CMR	Adrien Tameze
6	MF	FRA	Rémi Walter
7	FW	FRA	Myziane Maolida
8	MF	FRA	Pierre Lees-Melou
9	FW	DEN	Kasper Dolberg
10	FW	ALG	Adam Ounas (on loan from Napoli)
11	MF	TUN	Bassem Srarfi
12	DF	SEN	Racine Coly
14	FW	CMR	Ignatius Ganago
15	DF	FRA	Patrick Burner

No.	Pos.	Nation	Player
16	GK	FRA	Yannis Clementia
18	MF	FRA	Alexis Claude-Maurice
19	MF	FRA	Khéphren Thuram
20	DF	ALG	Youcef Atal
21	MF	BRA	Danilo Barbosa
22	MF	FRA	Arnaud Lusamba
23	DF	FRA	Malang Sarr
24	DF	FRA	Andy Pelmard
25	MF	FRA	Wylan Cyprien
28	MF	ALG	Hicham Boudaoui
29	DF	FRA	Christophe Hérelle
30	GK	FRA	Yoan Cardinale
40	GK	ARG	Walter Benítez

=== Out on loan ===
Note: Flags indicate national team as defined under FIFA eligibility rules; some limited exceptions apply. Players may hold more than one non-FIFA nationality.

No.	Pos.	Nation	Player
—	DF	FRA	Yanis Hamache (on loan to Red Star)
—	MF	FRA	Jean-Victor Makengo (on loan to Toulouse)

No.	Pos.	Nation	Player
—	MF	FRA	Eddy Sylvestre (on loan to Auxerre)
—	FW	FRA	Ihsan Sacko (on loan to Troyes)

=== Reserve squad ===
As of 23 January 2019

Note: Flags indicate national team as defined under FIFA eligibility rules; some limited exceptions apply. Players may hold more than one non-FIFA nationality.

No.	Pos.	Nation	Player
—	GK	FRA	Teddy Boulhendi
—	GK	FRA	Vicenzo Bezzina
—	DF	FRA	Denilson de Oliveira
—	DF	COM	Ancoub Mze Ali
—	DF	FRA	Yrlès Teoro
—	DF	FRA	Mathias Maurin
—	DF	FRA	Yanis Hamache
—	DF	FRA	Matthew Cox
—	MF	FRA	Jawad Dramé

No.	Pos.	Nation	Player
33	FW	FRA	Hicham Mahou
34	DF	CIV	Ibrahim Cissé
35	MF	TUN	Assil Jaziri
36	FW	FRA	Maxime Pélican
—	MF	FRA	Remi Mestrallet
—	MF	FRA	Paul Wade
—	MF	FRA	Thomas Valtriani
—	MF	FRA	Matéo Leveque
—	FW	FRA	Alexandre Gameiro

== Pre-season and friendlies ==
Win Draw Loss

7 July 2019 Friendly	PSV Eindhoven	2–3	Nice	Vevey, Switzerland
17:00 CEST (UTC+2)	Lammers 11'; Piroe 90+2'	Report	Sacko 37'; Saint-Maximin 42'; Coly 62'	Stadium: Stade de Copet; Attendance: 1,200

13 July 2019 Friendly	Nice	1–3	Thun	Divonne-les-Bains, France
17:00 CEST (UTC+2)	Ganago 18'; Thuram (yellow card) 87'	Report	Sorgić 5', 66'; Rapp 49'	Stadium: Centre sportif à Divonne-les-Bains

21 July 2019 Friendly	Standard Liège	2–1	Nice	Liège, Belgium
15:00 CEST (UTC+2)	Emond 22'; Dante 63' (o.g.)	Report	Sylvestre 53'	Stadium: Stade Maurice Dufrasne

24 July 2019 Friendly	Boavista	0–2	Nice	Porto, Portugal
19:45 WEST (UTC+1)		Report	Danilo 11'; Le Bihan 27'	Stadium: Estádio do Bessa; Referee: Hugo Miguel

27 July 2019 Friendly	Cardiff City	1–0	Nice	Cardiff, Wales
15:00 BST (UTC+1)	Ralls 1'	Report		Stadium: Cardiff City Stadium; Attendance: 6,643; Referee: Iwan Arwel Griffith

30 July 2019 Friendly	Burnley	6–1	Nice	Burnley, England
19:45 BST (UTC+1)	Wood 3', 8', 63'; Hendrick 18'; Guðmundsson 34'; Rodriguez 81'	Report	Saint-Maximin 67'	Stadium: Turf Moor; Attendance: 4,247; Referee: Michael Oliver

3 August 2019 Friendly	VfL Wolfsburg	8–1	Nice	Wolfsburg, Germany
15:00 CEST (UTC+2)	Klaus 7'; Weghorst 30'; Gerhardt 75', 85'; Brekalo 78'; Uduokhai 97'; Steffen 107' (pen.); Bruma 117'	Report	Dante 14'	Stadium: AOK Stadion; Attendance: 3,508; Referee: Johan Pfeifer

== Competitions ==
=== Overview ===
Competition	First match	Last match	Starting round	Final position	Record							
Competition	First match	Last match	Starting round	Final position	Pld	W	D	L	GF	GA	GD	Win %
Ligue 1	10 August 2019	7 March 2020	Matchday 1	5th	28	11	8	9	41	38	+3	39.29
Coupe de France	5 January 2020	30 January 2020	Round of 64	Round of 16	3	2	0	1	5	3	+2	66.67
Coupe de la Ligue	30 October 2019	30 October 2019	Round of 32	Round of 32	1	0	0	1	2	3	−1	0.00
Total					32	13	8	11	48	44	+4	40.63

Source: Soccerway

=== Ligue 1 ===
==== League table ====
Pos	Team	Pld	W	D	L	GF	GA	GD	Pts	PPG	Qualification or relegation
3	Rennes	28	15	5	8	38	24	+14	50	1.79	Qualification for the Champions League group stage
4	Lille	28	15	4	9	35	27	+8	49	1.75	Qualification for the Europa League group stage (Note: Since the winners of the Coupe de France and the Coupe de la Ligue, Paris Saint-Germain, qualified for the Champions League, the spot given to the Coupe de France winners (Europa League group stage) was passed to the fifth-placed team and the spot given to the Coupe de la Ligue winners (Europa League second qualifying round) was passed to the sixth-placed team.)
5	Nice	28	11	8	9	41	38	+3	41 (Note: Nice finished ahead of Reims on head-to-head points: Nice 2–0 Reims, Reims 1–1 Nice.)	1.46	Qualification for the Europa League group stage
6	Reims	28	10	11	7	26	21	+5	41	1.46	Qualification for the Europa League second qualifying round
7	Lyon	28	11	7	10	42	27	+15	40	1.43	

Source: Ligue 1
Rules for classification: 1) Points per game; 2) Head-to-head points; 3) Head-to-head goal difference; 4) Goal difference; 5) Goals scored; 6) Fairplay ranking.

==== Results summary ====
Overall								Home						Away					
Pld	W	D	L	GF	GA	GD	Pts	W	D	L	GF	GA	GD	W	D	L	GF	GA	GD
28	11	8	9	41	38	+3	41	8	4	3	28	20	+8	3	4	6	13	18	−5

Source: Ligue 1

==== Results by round ====
Round	1	2	3	4	5	6	7	8	9	10	11	12	13	14	15	16	17	18	19	20	21	22	23	24	25	26	27	28	29	30	31	32	33	34	35	36	37	38
Ground	H	A	H	A	A	H	A	H	A	H	A	H	H	A	H	A	H	A	H	A	H	H	A	H	A	H	A	H	A	H	A	H	A	A	H	A	H	A
Result	W	W	L	W	L	W	L	D	L	L	L	W	D	L	W	L	W	D	W	D	D	W	D	L	W	D	D	W	C	C	C	C	C	C	C	C	C	C
Position	7	2	5	3	6	3	7	6	8	11	15	13	13	15	12	14	13	13	10	11	12	8	8	11	9	10	9	6	5	5	5	5	5	5	5	5	5	5

Source: Ligue 1
A = Away; H = Home; W = Win; D = Draw; L = Loss; C = Cancelled

==== Matches ====
The Ligue 1 schedule was announced on 14 June 2019. The Ligue 1 matches were suspended by the LFP on 13 March 2020 due to COVID-19 until further notices. On 28 April 2020, it was announced that Ligue 1 and Ligue 2 campaigns would not resume, after the country banned all sporting events until September. On 30 April, The LFP ended officially the 2019–20 season.

10 August 2019 1	Nice	2–1	Amiens	Nice
20:00 CEST (UTC+2)	Hérelle 32'; Le Bihan (yellow card) 77'; Tameze (yellow card) 88'; Dante 90+5', (yellow card) 90+5'	Report	Monconduit (yellow card) 6'; Gnahoré (yellow card) 17' (yellow-red card) 27'; Guirassy (yellow card) 77'; Akolo 81'	Stadium: Allianz Riviera; Attendance: 17,718; Referee: Jérémie Pignard

17 August 2019 2	Nîmes	1–2	Nice	Nîmes
20:00 CEST (UTC+2)	Valls (yellow card) 25'; Ripart 45+1' (pen.); Martinez (yellow card) 71' (yellow-red card) 90+8'; Philippoteaux (yellow card) 89'; Alakouch (yellow card) 90+1'; Briançon (red card) 90+8'	Report	Cyprien 10' (pen.), (yellow card) 43'; Coly (yellow card) 11' (yellow-red card) 51'; Ganago 16'; Hérelle (yellow card) 35'; Tameze (yellow card) 72'	Stadium: Stade des Costières; Attendance: 13,243; Referee: François Letexier

28 August 2019 3	Nice	1–2	Marseille	Nice
21:00 CEST (UTC+2)	Cyprien 66' (pen.); Lees-Melou (yellow card) 90+4'	Report	Benedetto (yellow card) 18', (goal) 31'; Payet 73' (pen.)	Stadium: Allianz Riviera; Attendance: 31,825; Referee: Clément Turpin

1 September 2019 4	Rennes	1–2	Nice	Rennes
15:00 CEST (UTC+2)	Lloris 25' (o.g.); Camavinga (yellow card) 81'; Traoré (yellow card) 88'	Report	Burner (yellow card) 28'; Srarfi (yellow card) 49'; Cyprien 63' (pen.); Lees-Melou (yellow card) 85'; Coly 90+2'	Stadium: Roazhon Park; Attendance: 26,721; Referee: Johan Hamel

14 September 2019 5	Montpellier	2–1	Nice	Montpellier
20:00 CEST (UTC+2)	Delort 37'; Mendes (yellow card) 39'; Mollet 56', (yellow card) 57'	Report	Atal (yellow card) 21'; Tameze 35'; Coly (yellow card) 42'	Stadium: Stade de la Mosson; Attendance: 12,765; Referee: Olivier Thual

21 September 2019 6	Nice	2–1	Dijon	Nice
20:00 CEST (UTC+2)	Dolberg 30'; Atal 47', (yellow card) 61'; Sarr (yellow card) 73'	Report	Tavares 22'; Aguerd (yellow card) 44'; Amalfitano (yellow card) 86'; Lautoa (yellow card) 89'	Stadium: Allianz Riviera; Attendance: 16,255; Referee: Willy Delajod

24 September 2019 7	Monaco	3–1	Nice	Monaco
21:00 CEST (UTC+2)	Gelson (yellow card) 23'; Golovin 29', 74'; Bakayoko (yellow card) 65'; Ben Yedder 79'	Report	Dolberg (yellow card) 24'; Nsoki (yellow card) 26'; Burner 54'; Pelmard (yellow card) 86'	Stadium: Stade Louis II; Attendance: 9,358; Referee: Mikael Lesage

28 September 2019 8	Nice	1–1	Lille	Nice
20:00 CEST (UTC+2)	Dolberg 13'; Lusamba (yellow card) 30'; Danilo (yellow card) 90'	Report	Gabriel (yellow card) 14'; Luiz Araújo 24'; André (yellow card) 58'	Stadium: Allianz Riviera; Attendance: 18,295; Referee: Clément Turpin

5 October 2019 9	Nantes	1–0	Nice	Nantes
20:00 CEST (UTC+2)	Girotto (yellow card) 76'; Simon 86'	Report	Burner (yellow card) 90+5'; Atal (yellow card) 90+5'	Stadium: Stade de la Beaujoire; Attendance: 23,426; Referee: Amaury Delerue

18 October 2019 10	Nice	1–4	Paris Saint-Germain	Nice
20:45 CEST (UTC+2)	Cyprien (yellow card) 24' (yellow-red card) 74'; Ganago 67'; Hérelle (red card) 77'; Dante (yellow card) 90+3'	Report	Di María 15', 21'; Kurzawa (yellow card) 72'; Kimpembe (yellow card) 86'; Mbappé 88'; Icardi 90+2'	Stadium: Allianz Riviera; Attendance: 32,705; Referee: François Letexier

26 October 2019 11	Strasbourg	1–0	Nice	Strasbourg
20:00 CEST (UTC+2)	Thomasson 24'; Liénard (yellow card) 36'	Report	Coly (yellow card) 50' (yellow-red card) 56'; Atal (yellow card) 63'	Stadium: Stade de la Meinau; Attendance: 25,007; Referee: Mikael Lesage

3 November 2019 12	Nice	2–0	Reims	Nice
17:00 CET (UTC+1)	Atal (yellow card) 16'; Cyprien 33'; Hérelle 42'	Report	Doumbia (yellow card) 26' (yellow-red card) 26'; Romao (yellow card) 33'	Stadium: Allianz Riviera; Attendance: 15,468; Referee: Jérémy Stinat

8 November 2019 13	Nice	1–1	Bordeaux	Nice
20:45 CET (UTC+1)	Lees-Melou (yellow card) 8', (goal) 27'; Dante (yellow card) 56'	Report	Jovanović (yellow card) 22'; Briand 49' (pen.); Mexer (yellow card) 73'	Stadium: Allianz Riviera; Attendance: 16,173; Referee: Johan Hamel

23 November 2019 14	Lyon	2–1	Nice	Décines-Charpieu
17:30 CET (UTC+1)	Reine-Adélaïde 11', (yellow card) 33'; Dembélé 28' (pen.); Marçal (red card) 34'; T. Mendes (yellow card) 90+4'	Report	Dante (yellow card) 56'; Burner (yellow card) 66' (yellow-red card) 86'; Dolberg 78'; Ounas (yellow card) 90+4'	Stadium: Parc Olympique Lyonnais; Attendance: 49,401; Referee: Amaury Delerue

30 November 2019 15	Nice	3–1	Angers	Nice
20:00 CET (UTC+1)	Dante (yellow card) 7'; Lusamba 39'; Maolida 53'; Dolberg (yellow card) 75', (goal) 90'	Report	Fulgini 22'; Thioub (yellow card) 45+1'	Stadium: Allianz Riviera; Attendance: 15,814; Referee: Antony Gautier

4 December 2019 16	Saint-Étienne	4–1	Nice	Saint-Étienne
19:00 CET (UTC+1)	Bouanga 11' (pen.), 58'; Hamouma 38'; Fofana 40'; Ruffier (yellow card) 49'; Diony (yellow card) 88'	Report	Dolberg 15'; Lees-Melou (yellow card) 24'; Lloris (yellow card) 60'; Burner (yellow card) 82'	Stadium: Stade Geoffroy-Guichard; Attendance: 20,138; Referee: Thomas Leonard

7 December 2019 17	Nice	4–1	Metz	Nice
20:00 CET (UTC+1)	Cyprien 10', 41' (pen.); Ganago 59'; Lees-Melou 76'	Report	Boye (yellow card) 35'; Niane 74'; Centonze (yellow card) 82'	Stadium: Allianz Riviera; Attendance: 14,967; Referee: Jérémie Pignard

14 December 2019 18	Brest	0–0	Nice	Brest
20:00 CET (UTC+1)	Diallo (yellow card) 1'; Castelletto (yellow card) 16'; Battocchio (yellow card) 63'	Report	Burner (yellow card) 30'; Dante (yellow card) 33'	Stadium: Stade Francis-Le Blé; Attendance: 13,042; Referee: Frank Schneider

21 December 2019 19	Nice	3–0	Toulouse	Nice
20:45 CET (UTC+1)	Sarr 16'; Boudaoui 19', (yellow card) 25'; Lees-Melou 40'	Report	Koné (yellow card) 7'; Sangaré (yellow card) 37'; Isimat-Mirin (yellow card) 53'; Adli (yellow card) 89'	Stadium: Allianz Riviera; Attendance: 17,945; Referee: Stéphanie Frappart

11 January 2020 20	Angers	1–1	Nice	Angers
20:00 CET (UTC+1)	Capelle (yellow card) 34'; Thioub 37'	Report	Boudaoui (yellow card) 39'; Cyprien 45+4' (pen.); Claude-Maurice (yellow card) 49'; Lees-Melou (yellow card) 87'	Stadium: Stade Raymond Kopa; Attendance: 9,105; Referee: Willy Delajod

24 January 2020 21	Nice	1–1	Rennes	Nice
20:45 CET (UTC+1)	Dolberg 48'	Report	Léa Siliki (yellow card) 65'; Tait 81'	Stadium: Allianz Riviera; Attendance: 15,199; Referee: Hakim Ben El Hadj

2 February 2020 22	Nice	2–1	Lyon	Nice
15:00 CET (UTC+1)	Dolberg 33', 64'; Ounas (yellow card) 38' (yellow-red card) 45+5'; Claude-Maurice (yellow card) 45+5'; Hérelle (yellow card) 71'	Report	Marçal (red card) 22'; Toko Ekambi 45'; Marcelo (yellow card) 45+5'; Rafael (yellow card) 52'	Stadium: Allianz Riviera; Attendance: 23,553; Referee: Benoît Bastien

5 February 2020 23	Reims	1–1	Nice	Reims
19:00 CET (UTC+1)	Cassamá (yellow card) 72'; Abdelhamid 77'; Chavalerin (yellow card) 78'	Report	Lees-Melou 50'	Stadium: Stade Auguste Delaune; Attendance: 11,384; Referee: Eric Wattellier

8 February 2020 24	Nice	1–3	Nîmes	Nice
20:00 CET (UTC+1)	Claude-Maurice 6'; Nsoki (yellow card) 33'; Boudaoui (red card) 49'; Danilo (yellow card) 53'	Report	Martinez (yellow card) 31'; Landre 43'; Philippoteaux 53'; Benrahou (yellow card) 65'; Paquiez (yellow card) 65'; Sarr (yellow card) 75'; Koné 90+1'	Stadium: Allianz Riviera; Attendance: 15,603; Referee: Antony Gautier

15 February 2020 25	Toulouse	0–2	Nice	Toulouse
20:00 CET (UTC+1)	Gabrielsen (red card) 27'; Gradel (yellow card) 58'; Moreira (red card) 77'; Sangaré (yellow card) 84'	Report	Lees-Melou 12'; Hérelle 90+6'	Stadium: Stadium de Toulouse; Attendance: 12,903; Referee: Jérôme Miguelgorry

21 February 2020 26	Nice	2–2	Brest	Nice
19:00 CET (UTC+1)	Danilo (yellow card) 6'; Hérelle (yellow card) 19'; Ounas 23'; Dolberg 33'; Nsoki (yellow card) 60'	Report	Grandsir 45'; Dante 53' (o.g.)	Stadium: Allianz Riviera; Attendance: 15,856; Referee: Jérémie Pignard

1 March 2020 27	Bordeaux	1–1	Nice	Bordeaux
17:00 CET (UTC+1)	Kalu (yellow card) 16'; De Préville 21'; Kwateng (yellow card) 57'; Bašić (yellow card) 85'	Report	Thuram (yellow card) 32'; Dante (yellow card) 39'; Ounas 57'; Sarr (yellow card) 90+3'	Stadium: Matmut Atlantique; Attendance: 15,799; Referee: Benoît Millot

7 March 2020 28	Nice	2–1	Monaco	Nice
20:00 CET (UTC+1)	Danilo (yellow card) 51'; Dolberg 59', 90+2'	Report	Glik (yellow card) 24'; Ben Yedder 32'; Fàbregas (yellow card) 71'; Slimani (yellow card) 82'; Jovetić (red card) 86'	Stadium: Allianz Riviera; Referee: Amaury Delerue

29	Paris Saint-Germain	Cancelled	Nice	Paris
--:-- CEST (UTC+2)				Stadium: Parc des Princes; Attendance: 0

30	Nice	Cancelled	Montpellier	Nice
--:-- CEST (UTC+2)				Stadium: Allianz Riviera; Attendance: 0

31	Dijon	Cancelled	Nice	Dijon
--:-- CEST (UTC+2)				Stadium: Stade Gaston Gérard; Attendance: 0

32	Nice	Cancelled	Strasbourg	Nice
--:-- CEST (UTC+2)				Stadium: Allianz Riviera; Attendance: 0

33	Lille	Cancelled	Nice	Villeneuve-d'Ascq
--:-- CEST (UTC+2)				Stadium: Stade Pierre-Mauroy

34	Marseille	Cancelled	Nice	Marseille
--:-- CEST (UTC+2)				Stadium: Stade Vélodrome

35	Nice	Cancelled	Nantes	Nice
--:-- CEST (UTC+2)				Stadium: Allianz Riviera

36	Metz	Cancelled	Nice	Metz
--:-- CEST (UTC+2)				Stadium: Stade Saint-Symphorien

37	Nice	Cancelled	Saint-Étienne	Nice
--:-- CEST (UTC+2)				Stadium: Allianz Riviera

38	Amiens	Cancelled	Nice	Amiens
--:-- CEST (UTC+2)				Stadium: Stade de la Licorne

=== Coupe de France ===
5 January 2020 Round of 64	Nice	2–0	Étoile Fréjus Saint-Raphaël	Nice
17:15 CET (UTC+1)	Lees-Melou (yellow card) 36'; Boudaoui 55', (yellow card) 73'; Ounas 90+2'	Report	Mouillon (yellow card) 9'; Fachan (red card) 25'; Delvigne (yellow card) 31'	Stadium: Allianz Riviera; Attendance: 8,655; Referee: Nicolas Rainville

18 January 2020 Round of 32	Nice	2–1	Red Star	Nice
13:00 CET (UTC+1)	Danilo 26'; Ganago 29'	Report	Hamache 90+2' (pen.)	Stadium: Allianz Riviera; Attendance: 14,622; Referee: Clément Turpin

30 January 2020 Round of 16	Nice	1–2	Lyon	Nice
20:55 CET (UTC+1)	Thuram (yellow card) 65'; Ounas 89'; Dante (yellow card) 90+1'	Report	Dembélé 15'; Tete (yellow card) 73'; Marcelo (yellow card) 73'; Rafael (yellow card) 76'; Aouar 90+3' (pen.)	Stadium: Allianz Riviera; Attendance: 9,646; Referee: Frank Schneider

=== Coupe de la Ligue ===
30 October 2019 Round of 32	Le Mans	3–2	Nice	Le Mans
18:45 CET (UTC+1)	Créhin 1'; Lemonnier (yellow card) 8', (goal) 13'; Kanté 16'; Diarra (yellow card) 46'; Confais (yellow card) 76'	Report	Cyprien 15' (pen.); Lees-Melou 18'; Atal (yellow card) 20'; Ganago (yellow card) 90+4'	Stadium: MMArena; Attendance: 12,260; Referee: Benoît Millot

== Statistics ==
=== Appearances and goals ===
No.	Pos	Nat	Player	Total		Ligue 1		Coupe de France		Coupe de la Ligue	
No.	Pos	Nat	Player	Apps	Goals	Apps	Goals	Apps	Goals	Apps	Goals
Goalkeepers
16	GK	(France) FRA	Yannis Clementia	3	0	2	0	0	0	1	0
30	GK	(France) FRA	Yoan Cardinale	0	0	0	0	0	0	0	0
40	GK	(Argentina) ARG	Walter Benítez	27	0	26	0	1	0	0	0
Defenders
2	DF	(France) FRA	Stanley Nsoki	18	0	14+3	0	1	0	0	0
3	DF	(France) FRA	Gautier Lloris	3	0	3	0	0	0	0	0
4	DF	(Brazil) BRA	Dante	23	1	21	1	1	0	1	0
5	DF	(France) FRA	Adrien Tameze	9	1	6+2	1	0	0	1	0
12	DF	(Senegal) SEN	Racine Coly	1	0	0	0	0+1	0	0	0
15	DF	(France) FRA	Patrick Burner	22	1	15+5	1	1	0	1	0
20	DF	(Algeria) ALG	Youcef Attal	14	1	12+1	1	0	0	1	0
23	DF	(France) FRA	Malang Sarr	17	1	13+3	1	0	0	1	0
24	DF	(France) FRA	Andy Pelmard	10	0	8+2	0	0	0	0	0
27	DF	(Denmark) DEN	Riza Durmisi	5	0	2+2	0	1	0	0	0
29	DF	(France) FRA	Christophe Hérelle	16	3	13+2	3	0	0	1	0
34	DF	(Ivory Coast) CIV	Ibrahim Cissé	2	0	0+2	0	0	0	0	0
Midfielders
6	MF	(France) FRA	Rémi Walter	1	0	1	0	0	0	0	0
8	MF	(France) FRA	Pierre Lees-Melou	28	6	25+1	5	1	0	1	1
11	MF	(Tunisia) TUN	Bassem Srarfi	4	0	1+2	0	0	0	1	0
18	MF	(France) FRA	Alexis Claude-Maurice	22	1	19+3	1	0	0	0	0
19	MF	(France) FRA	Khéphren Thuram	14	0	7+7	0	0	0	0	0
21	MF	(Brazil) BRA	Danilo Barbosa	18	0	12+4	0	0+1	0	0+1	0
22	MF	(France) FRA	Arnaud Lusamba	15	1	11+4	1	0	0	0	0
25	MF	(France) FRA	Wylan Cyprien	22	8	20	7	1	0	1	1
28	MF	(Algeria) ALG	Hicham Boudaoui	11	2	6+3	1	1	1	0+1	0
Forwards
7	FW	(France) FRA	Myziane Maolida	20	1	7+11	1	1	0	0+1	0
9	FW	(Denmark) DEN	Kasper Dolberg	24	11	22+1	11	1	0	0	0
10	FW	(Algeria) ALG	Adam Ounas	17	3	14+2	2	1	1	0	0
14	FW	(Cameroon) CMR	Ignatius Ganago	27	3	12+14	3	0	0	1	0
	FW	(France) FRA	Evann Guessand	1	0	0	0	0+1	0	0	0
Players transferred out during the season

Last updated: 11 January 2020
Source: Competitions
