= Hazza (name) =

Hazza is an Arabic-origin masculine given name. Notable people with the name are as follows:

== Given name ==
- Hazza Ali (born 1995), Bahraini footballer
- Hazza Al Balushi (born 1995), Omani Quran reciter
- Hazzaa Al-Ghamdi (born 2001), Saudi Arabian footballer
- Hazza' Majali (1917–1960), Jordanian politician
- Hazza Al Mansouri (born 1983), Emirati astronaut
- Hazza bin Sultan Al Nahyan (1905–1958), Emirati royal
- Hazza bin Zayed Al Nahyan (born 1965), Emirati royal and government official
- Hazza Salem (born 1989), Emirati football player
- Hazza Subait (born 2003), Emirati football player

== See also ==
- Hazza (disambiguation)
