= Hazza (disambiguation) =

Hazza is an Australian journalist and musician. It may also refer to:

- Hazza (name), list of people with the name
- Hazza bin Zayed Stadium, multi-purpose stadium in Abu Dhabi, United Arab Emirates
