= 2021 Arab Cup U-20 =

كأس العرب للمنتخبات تحت 20 سنة

Tournament details
- Host country: Egypt
- City: Cairo
- Dates: 20 June – 6 July
- Teams: 16 (from 2 confederations)
- Venues: 5 (in 1 host city)

Final positions
- Champions: Saudi Arabia (2nd title)
- Runners-up: Algeria

Tournament statistics
- Matches played: 31
- Goals scored: 107 (3.45 per match)
- Top scorer(s): (Morocco) Mohamed Radid (6 goals)
- Best goalkeeper: (Saudi Arabia) Osama Al-Mermsh

The 2021 Arab Cup U-20 (Arabic: كأس العرب للمنتخبات تحت 20 سنة) was the seventh edition of the Arab Cup U-20. It was hosted by Egypt from 20 June to 6 July 2021. The tournament included 12 UAFA-member teams and four invited teams. Senegal were the defending champions but were eliminated in the quarter-finals. Saudi Arabia beat Algeria 2–1 in the final to win their second title.

== Teams ==
- Algeria
- Comoros
- Djibouti
- Egypt (hosts)
- Iraq
- Lebanon
- Mauritania
- Morocco
- Niger (invited)
- Saudi Arabia
- Senegal (invited)
- Tajikistan (invited)
- Tunisia
- United Arab Emirates
- Uzbekistan (invited)
- Yemen

== Draw ==
The draw took place on 29 May 2021. The 16 teams were drawn into four groups of four. The match schedule was unveiled on 6 June 2021.

The draw mechanism was in accordance with the seeding of the teams, as follows:

Pot 1	Pot 2	Pot 3	Pot 4
Egypt; Senegal; Tunisia; Morocco	Algeria; Iraq; Saudi Arabia; United Arab Emirates	Mauritania; Djibouti; Lebanon; Uzbekistan (Note: Uzbekistan was not yet invited at the time of the draw.)	Yemen; Comoros; Niger; Tajikistan

== Venues ==
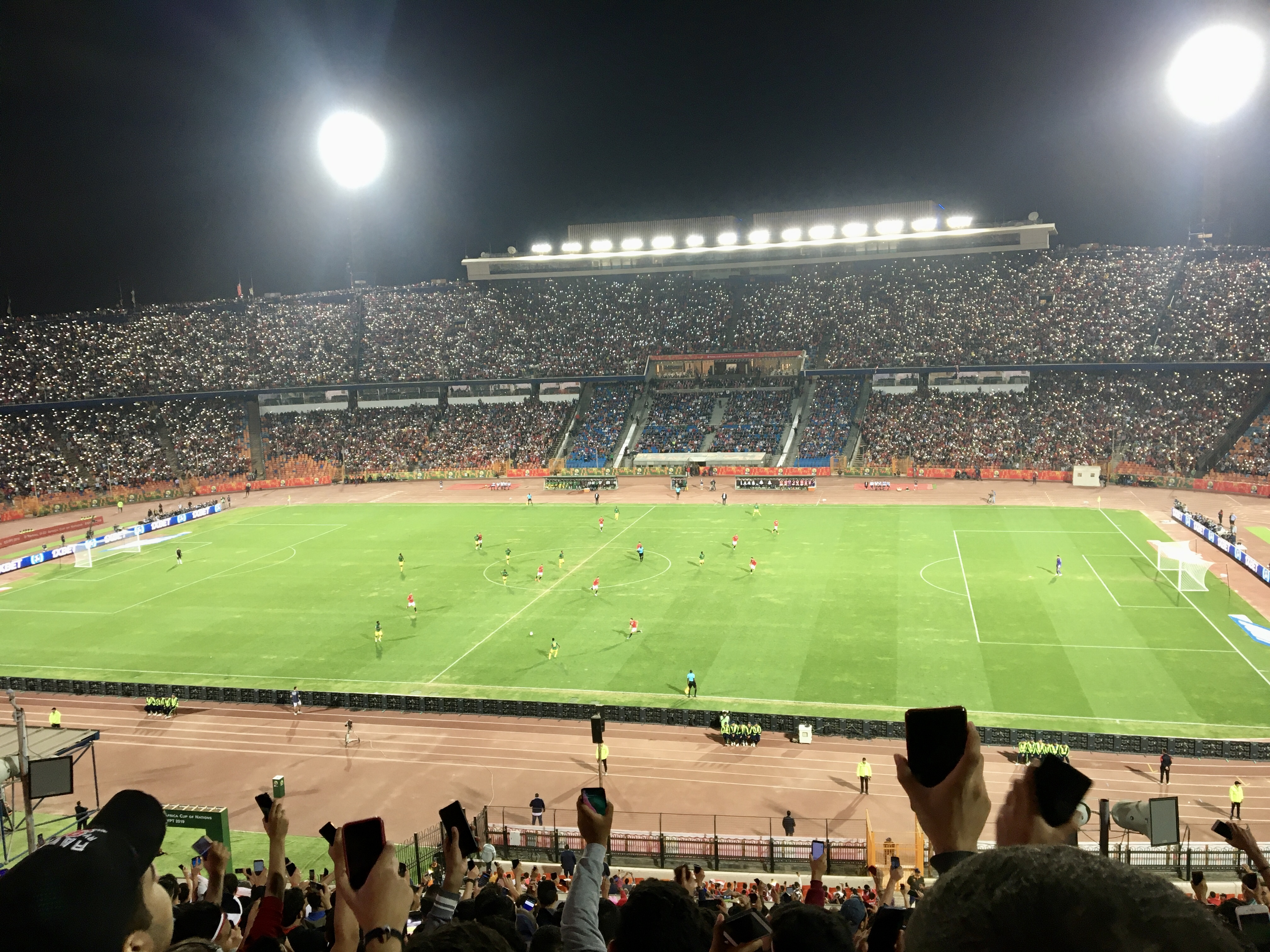
Cairo International Stadium hosted the majority of matches.

The 30 June Stadium was later included as a venue for the Group D matches due to the poor condition of Police Academy Stadium.

Cities	Venues	Capacity
Cairo	Cairo International Stadium	75,000
Cairo	Osman Ahmed Osman Stadium	35,000
Cairo	30 June Stadium	30,000
Cairo	Petro Sport Stadium	16,000
Cairo	~~Police Academy Stadium~~	12,000

== Match officials ==
The following 31 referees were chosen for the tournament.

- (Algeria) Lahlou Benbraham
- (Egypt) Mohamed Maarouf Eid Mansour
- (Iraq) Zaid Thamer Mohammed
- (Jordan) Mohamad Ghabaien
- (Kuwait) Abdullah Al Jamali
- (Libya) Abdul Basit Shahoub
- (Oman) Qassim Al-Hatmi
- (Morocco) Jalal Jayed
- (Palestine) Baraa Abu Aisha
- (Qatar) Abdulhadi Al Ruaile
- (Saudi Arabia) Majid Al Shamrani
- (Tunisia) Amir Loussif
- (United Arab Emirates) Sultan Al-Hammadi

== Squads ==
Players born on or after 1 January 2001 were eligible to compete.

== Group stage ==
The top two teams of each group advanced to the quarter-finals.

All times are local, CAT (UTC+2).

=== Group A ===
Pos	Team	Pld	W	D	L	GF	GA	GD	Pts	Qualification
1	Egypt (H)	3	3	0	0	7	1	+6	9	Advance to knockout phase
2	Algeria	3	1	1	1	3	3	0	4	Advance to knockout phase
3	Niger	3	0	2	1	2	4	−2	2	
4	Mauritania	3	0	1	2	1	5	−4	1	

Source: GSA
Rules for classification: Group stage tiebreakers
(H) Hosts
20 June 2021
16:00

Egypt	2–0	Niger
Smida 25'; Hassan 90+3'	Report

Cairo International Stadium, Cairo
Referee: Amir Loussif (Tunisia)
20 June 2021
19:00

Mauritania	0–1	Algeria
	Report	Bouaoune 90+5'

Cairo International Stadium, Cairo
Referee: Sultan Al-Hammadi (United Arab Emirates)

23 June 2021
16:00

Algeria	0–1	Egypt
	Report	Rashdan 63'

Cairo International Stadium, Cairo
Referee: Majid Al Shamrani (Saudi Arabia)
23 June 2021
19:00

Niger	0–0	Mauritania
	Report

Cairo International Stadium, Cairo
Referee: Abdullah Al Jamali (Kuwait)

26 June 2021
16:00

Egypt	4–1	Mauritania
Hassan 17', 32'; Abdelhamid 41'; Abdeljawad 81'	Report	Mouloud 84'

Cairo International Stadium, Cairo
Referee: Abdullah Al Jamali (Kuwait)
26 June 2021
16:00

Algeria	2–2	Niger
Mustapha 60' (o.g.); Dougui 90+3'	Report	Omar 22'; Samila 37'

Osman Ahmed Osman Stadium, Cairo
Referee: Baraa Abu Aisha (Palestine)

=== Group B ===
Pos	Team	Pld	W	D	L	GF	GA	GD	Pts	Qualification
1	Morocco	3	3	0	0	15	1	+14	9	Advance to knockout phase
2	Tajikistan	3	2	0	1	9	8	+1	6	Advance to knockout phase
3	United Arab Emirates	3	1	0	2	10	8	+2	3	
4	Djibouti	3	0	0	3	0	17	−17	0	

Source: GSA
Rules for classification: Group stage tiebreakers
20 June 2021
16:00

Morocco	6–1	Tajikistan
Sadik 18'; Radid 49', 59'; El Khannous 61'; Akboub 85'; Boughafer 90+1'	Report	Tahirov 66'

Osman Ahmed Osman Stadium, Cairo
Referee: Abdulhadi Al Ruaile (Qatar)
20 June 2021
19:00

United Arab Emirates	8–0	Djibouti
Saeed 16', 81'; Al Yammahi 45'; Khalfan 59'; Adil 76'; Al Wafi 78'; Ahmed 90+4'; Fahad 90+6'	Report

Osman Ahmed Osman Stadium, Cairo
Referee: Abdul Basit Shahoub (Libya)

23 June 2021
16:00

Djibouti	0–4	Morocco
	Report	Boughafer 18'; Sadik 28'; El Khannous 37'; Radid 48'

Osman Ahmed Osman Stadium, Cairo
Referee: Zaid Thamer Mohammed (Iraq)
23 June 2021
19:00

Tajikistan	3–2	United Arab Emirates
Azizboyev 12', 66', 90'	Report	Khalfan 23', 74'

Osman Ahmed Osman Stadium, Cairo
Referee: Qassim Al-Hatmi (Oman)

26 June 2021
19:00

Morocco	5–0	United Arab Emirates
Sadik 8', 20'; Radid 45', 88'; Azrour 70'	Report

Cairo International Stadium, Cairo
Referee: Majid Al Shamrani (Saudi Arabia)
26 June 2021
19:00

Djibouti	0–5	Tajikistan
	Report	Salimshoev 8'; Hudojdodzoda 20', 89'; Ashurmadov 84'; Akhtamov 87'

Osman Ahmed Osman Stadium, Cairo
Referee: Mohamad Ghabaien (Jordan)

=== Group C ===
Pos	Team	Pld	W	D	L	GF	GA	GD	Pts	Qualification
1	Senegal	3	2	1	0	11	3	+8	7	Advance to knockout phase
2	Comoros	3	2	0	1	8	9	−1	6	Advance to knockout phase
3	Iraq	3	1	1	1	6	5	+1	4	
4	Lebanon	3	0	0	3	2	10	−8	0	

Source: GSA
Rules for classification: Group stage tiebreakers
21 June 2021
16:00

Senegal	5–1	Lebanon
S. Faye 9'; Diao 22'; Cissoko 56'; Ndoye 60' (pen.); M. Faye 79'	Report	Ismail 3'

Petro Sport Stadium, Cairo
Referee: Mohamad Ghabaien (Jordan)
21 June 2021
19:00

Iraq	3–4	Comoros
Salam 5'; Abdul Razzaq 39' (pen.); Ayoub 83'	Report	Idris 41'; Mahmoud 45+4' (pen.), 70'; Yassin 53'

Petro Sport Stadium, Cairo
Referee: Jalal Jayed (Morocco)

24 June 2021
16:00

Comoros	1–5	Senegal
Mahmoud 86' (pen.)	Report	S. Faye 4', 36'; Cissoko 57'; M. Faye 90+1'; Gning 90+2'

Petro Sport Stadium, Cairo
Referee: Mohamed Maarouf Eid Mansour (Egypt)
24 June 2021
19:00

Lebanon	0–2	Iraq
	Report	Hassan 16'; Ayoub 83'

Petro Sport Stadium, Cairo
Referee: Amir Loussif (Tunisia)

27 June 2021
16:00

Senegal	1–1	Iraq
S. Faye 72'	Report	Abdul Razzaq 28'

Petro Sport Stadium, Cairo
Referee: Lahlou Benbraham (Algeria)
27 June 2021
16:00

Comoros	3–1	Lebanon
Mahmoud 25'; Yassin 33'; Abtah 69'	Report	Kassas 19'

30 June Stadium, Cairo
Referee: Abdul Basit Shahoub (Libya)

=== Group D ===
Pos	Team	Pld	W	D	L	GF	GA	GD	Pts	Qualification
1	Tunisia	3	3	0	0	5	1	+4	9	Advance to knockout phase
2	Saudi Arabia	3	2	0	1	5	3	+2	6	Advance to knockout phase
3	Yemen	3	1	0	2	4	5	−1	3	
4	Uzbekistan	3	0	0	3	1	6	−5	0	

Source: GSA
Rules for classification: Group stage tiebreakers
21 June 2021
16:00

Tunisia	2–0	Yemen
Senana 24'; Abid 57'	Report

Osman Ahmed Osman Stadium, Cairo
Referee: Baraa Abu Aisha (Palestine)
21 June 2021
19:00

Saudi Arabia	2–0	Uzbekistan
Al-Dawsari 4'; Radif 36'	Report

Osman Ahmed Osman Stadium, Cairo
Referee: Mohamed Maarouf Eid Mansour (Egypt)

24 June 2021
16:00

Uzbekistan	0–1	Tunisia
	Report	Abid 24'

30 June Stadium, Cairo
Referee: Lahlou Benbraham (Algeria)
24 June 2021
19:00

Yemen	1–2	Saudi Arabia
Hazazi 29' (o.g.)	Report	Radif 28'; Al-Nemer 60'

30 June Stadium, Cairo
Referee: Sultan Al-Hammadi (United Arab Emirates)

27 June 2021
19:00

Tunisia	2–1	Saudi Arabia
Jertila 14', 27'	Report	Al-Nemer 47'

30 June Stadium, Cairo
Referee: Jalal Jayed (Morocco)
27 June 2021
19:00

Uzbekistan	1–3	Yemen
Abed Elakh Boldochiv	Report	Gacem Charafi; Ammar Noman; Imed Eljdaima (pen.)

Petro Sport Stadium, Cairo
Referee: Abdulhadi Al Ruaile (Qatar)

== Knockout phase ==
In the knockout stage, penalty shoot-out was used to decide the winner if necessary (no extra time was played).

=== Bracket ===
Quarter-finals
29 June
Egypt	3
Tajikistan	0
30 June
Senegal	1 (2)
Saudi Arabia (p)	1 (3)
29 June
Morocco	1 (3)
Algeria (p)	1 (4)
30 June
Tunisia	1
Comoros	0

Semi-finals
3 July
Egypt	2
Saudi Arabia	3
3 July
Algeria	2
Tunisia	0

Final
6 July
Saudi Arabia	2
Algeria	1

=== Quarter-finals ===
29 June 2021
17:00

Egypt	3–0	Tajikistan
Sherif 29'; Hawash 37'; Hassan 48'	Report

Cairo International Stadium, Cairo
Referee: Abdulhadi Al Ruaile (Qatar)

29 June 2021
20:00

Morocco	1–1	Algeria
Radid 29' (pen.)	Report	Mahour 90+3'
Penalties
Nanah (penalty missed); Sadik (penalty scored); El Hammami (penalty scored); Chraibi (penalty scored); Radid (penalty missed)	3–4	(penalty scored) Mohra; (penalty scored) Belmokthar; (penalty scored) Titraoui; (penalty missed) Namani; (penalty scored) Mahour

Cairo International Stadium, Cairo
Referee: Zaid Thamer Mohammed (Iraq)

30 June 2021
17:00

Senegal	1–1	Saudi Arabia
S. Faye 62'	Report	Radif 43'
Penalties
Diaw (penalty missed); Gueye (penalty missed); Cissoko (penalty scored); Diouf (penalty scored); S. Faye (penalty missed)	2–3	(penalty scored) Radif; (penalty scored) Almari; (penalty missed) Al Dawsari; (penalty scored) Al-Oyayari; (penalty missed) Al-Nemer

Cairo International Stadium, Cairo
Referee: Amir Loussif (Tunisia)

30 June 2021
20:00

Tunisia	1–0	Comoros
Senana 4'	Report

Cairo International Stadium, Cairo
Referee: Mohamed Maarouf Eid Mansour (Egypt)

=== Semi-finals ===
3 July 2021
17:00

Egypt	2–3	Saudi Arabia
Sherif 45+2'; A. Abdelhamid 51'	Report	Radif 26'; Al Aliwa 28'; Al Zaid 69'

Cairo International Stadium, Cairo
Referee: Jalal Jayed (Morocco)

3 July 2021
20:00

Algeria	2–0	Tunisia
Omar 67', 77'	Report

Cairo International Stadium, Cairo
Referee: Zaid Thamer Mohammed (Iraq)

=== Final ===
The final match was initially scheduled to be played at the Cairo International Stadium at 20:00. The UAFA decided to play the game at 17:00 at the 30 June Stadium, also in Cairo.

6 July 2021
17:00

Saudi Arabia	2–1	Algeria
Al-Juwayr 3'; Baker 77'	Report	Boulbina 54'

30 June Stadium, Cairo
Referee: Sultan Al-Hammadi (United Arab Emirates)

== Statistics ==
=== Goalscorers ===
There were 107 goals scored in 31 matches, for an average of 3.45 goals per match.

6 goals

- (Morocco) Mohamed Radid

5 goals

- (Senegal) Souleymane Faye

4 goals

- (Saudi Arabia) Abdullah Radif
- (Egypt) Youssef Hassan
- (Morocco) Omar Sadik
- (Comoros) Mahmoud Adel

3 goals

- (Tajikistan) Muhammadali Azizboyev
- (United Arab Emirates) Eisa Khalfan

2 goals

- (Algeria) Mohamed Omar
- (Iraq) Abdul Qader Ayoub
- (Iraq) Kassem Abdul Razzaq
- (Morocco) Ilyas Boughafer
- (Morocco) Bilal El Khannous
- (Saudi Arabia) Meshari Al-Nemer
- (Senegal) Ibrahima Cissoko
- (Senegal) Mami Faye
- (Tunisia) Aziz Abid
- (Tunisia) Hedi Jertila
- (Tunisia) Youssef Senana
- (United Arab Emirates) Mansoor Saeed
- (Tajikistan) Abdulfattoh Hudojdodzoda
- (Comoros) Fahad Yassin
- (Egypt) Ahmed Abdelhamid
- (Egypt) Ahmed Sherif

1 goal

- (Algeria) Issam Bouaoune
- (Algeria) Adil Boulbina
- (Algeria) Adam Dougui
- (Algeria) Samy Mahour
- (Comoros) Isman Idris
- (Comoros) Haider Abtah
- (Morocco) Abdellah Azrour
- (Egypt) Abdel Rahman Rashdan
- (Egypt) Abd Alrahman Smida
- (Egypt) Abdeljawad Abdeljawad
- (Egypt) Ahmed Hawash
- (Iraq) Blnd Hassan
- (Iraq) Nasr Salam
- (Lebanon) Ali Reda Ismail
- (Lebanon) Ali Kassas
- (Morocco) Hassan Akboub
- (Saudi Arabia) Abdulaziz Al-Elewai
- (Saudi Arabia) Mohammed Al Dawsari
- (Saudi Arabia) Musab Al-Juwayr
- (Saudi Arabia) Suhaib Al Zaid
- (Saudi Arabia) Mohammed Baker
- (Senegal) Mamadou Gning
- (Senegal) Ousmane Diao
- (Senegal) Malick Ndoye
- (Tajikistan) Fakhriddin Akhtamov
- (Tajikistan) Salam Ashurmadov
- (Tajikistan) Kabir Salimshoev
- (Tajikistan) Khosrow Tahirov
- (United Arab Emirates) Mohamad Al Yammahi
- (United Arab Emirates) Sultan Adil
- (United Arab Emirates) Mohamed Al Wafi
- (United Arab Emirates) Mubarak Ahmed
- (United Arab Emirates) Dhari Fahad
- (Mauritania) Bilal Mouloud
- (Niger) Adam Omar
- (Niger) Salah Samila
- (Uzbekistan) Abed Elakh Boldochiv
- (Yemen) Gacem Charafi
- (Yemen) Ammar Noman
- (Yemen) Imed Eljdaima

1 own goal

- (Niger) Ahmed Mustapha (against Algeria)
- (Saudi Arabia) Sulaiman Hazazi (against Yemen)

== See also ==
- 2021 Arab Cup U-17
- 2021 Arab Women's Cup
