= Royal Excelsior Virton =

Association football club in Belgium

Virton
- Full name: Royal Excelsior Virton
- Nicknames: Les Gaumais; Les Verts ("The Greens")
- Short name: RE Virton
- Founded: 14 April 1922; 104 years ago
- Ground: Stade Yvan Georges, Virton
- Capacity: 4,572
- Owner: N'Golo Kanté
- Chairman: Rebeai Khabtane
- Manager: Dražen Brnčić
- League: Challenger Pro League
- 2025–26: Division 1 FFA, 1st of 12 (promoted)
- Website: www.revirton.be
Home colours	Away colours

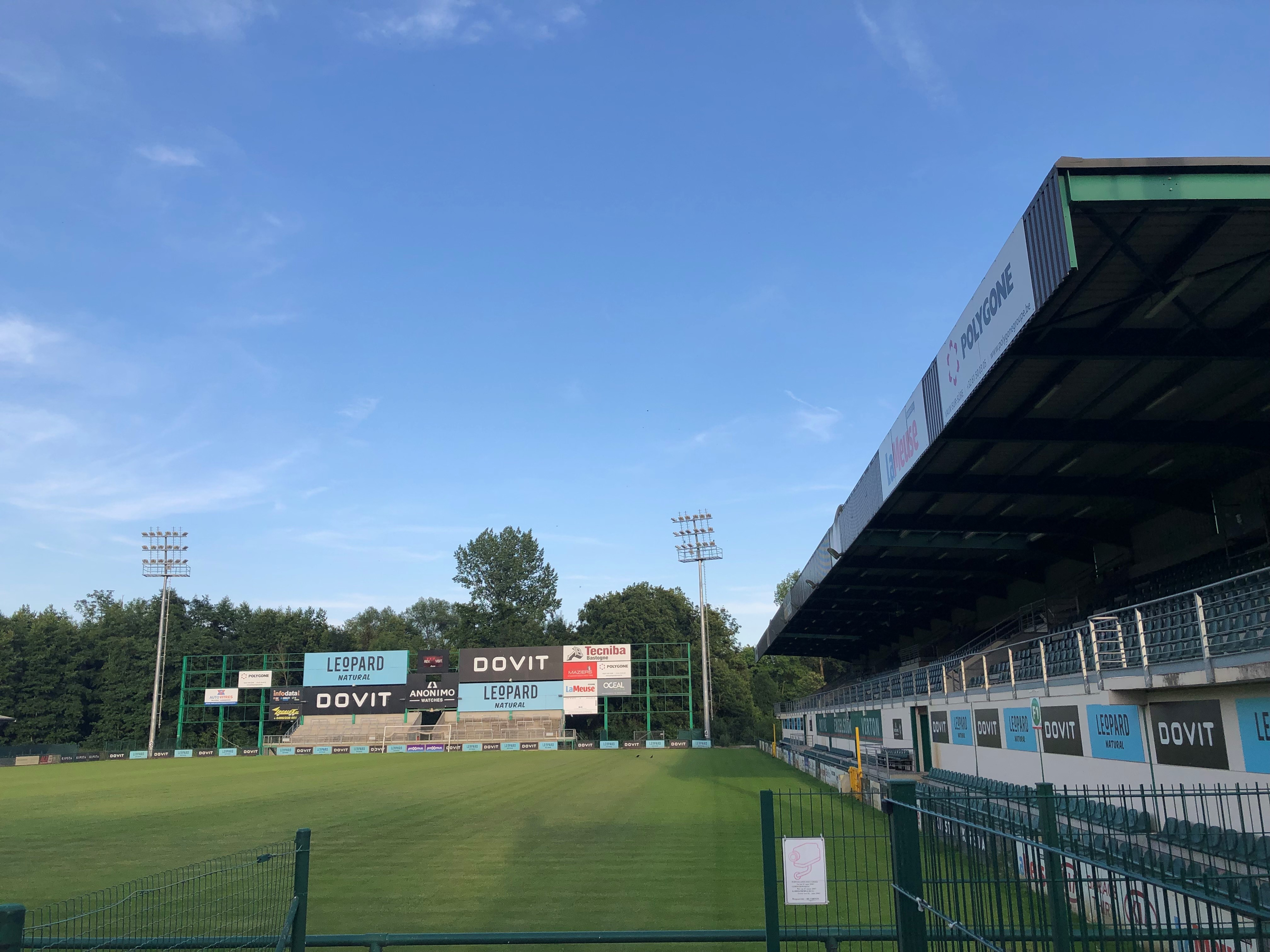
Yvan Georges stadium

Royal Excelsior Virton is a Belgian football club based in Virton, in the Luxembourg province of Belgium. The club plays its home matches at the Stade Yvan Georges and competes in the Challenger Pro League, the second tier of Belgian football.

Founded on 14 April 1922, the club is commonly known as Les Gaumais, a reference to the Gaume region in which it is based, and Les Verts, a reference to their green home colours. Virton spent most of their history in the amateur divisions before winning promotion to the second-tier Challenger Pro League for the 2021–22 and 2022–23 seasons, after which they were relegated. In June 2023, the club was acquired by French professional footballer N'Golo Kanté.

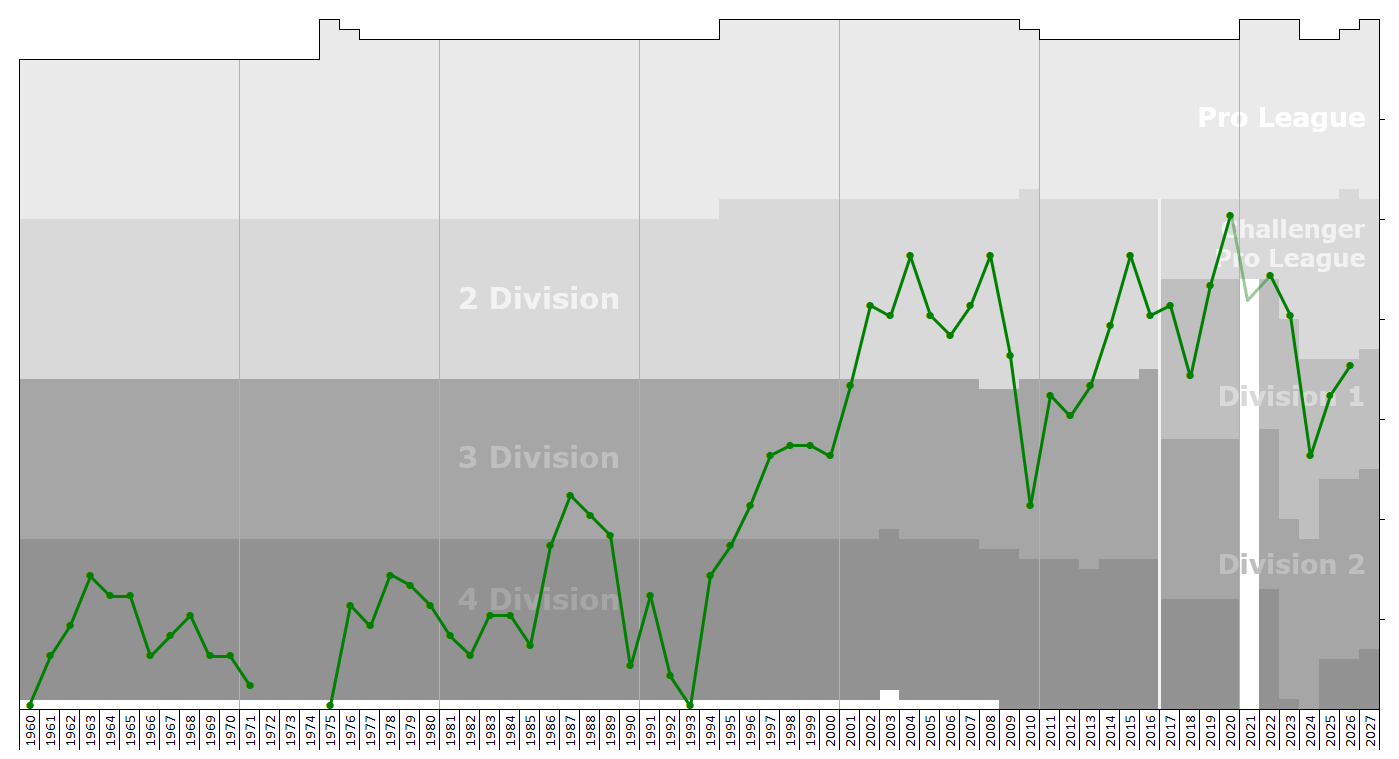
Historical chart of RE Virton league performance

== Current squad ==
As of 3 September 2026

Note: Flags indicate national team as defined under FIFA eligibility rules; some limited exceptions apply. Players may hold more than one non-FIFA nationality.

No.	Pos.	Nation	Player
1	GK	BEL	Célestin De Schrevel
2	DF	GAB	Brad Mantsounga (on loan from Nice)
3	DF	FRA	Allan Tchaptchet
4	DF	MAD	Ehsan Kari
5	DF	FRA	Teddy Mézague
6	MF	BEL	Maxime Guillaume
8	MF	FRA	Gaëtan Arib
9	FW	FRA	Marks Inchaud
10	MF	FRA	Paul Wade
11	FW	FRA	Abdelsamad Hachem (on loan from Red Star)
13	MF	FRA	Alliou Dembélé
14	MF	NOR	Luca Maiorano
16	GK	BEL	Nicolas Closset
17	FW	FRA	Tyrone Tormin

No.	Pos.	Nation	Player
18	DF	FRA	Jean-Claude Ntenda
19	FW	ESP	Ihab Goudani
20	MF	BEL	Lorenzo De Geyndt
21	MF	FRA	Antoine Valério
22	DF	BEL	Steeven Assengue (on loan from Standard Liège)
23	MF	MTN	Adama Diop
24	DF	BEL	Hugo Lambotte (on loan from Sint-Truiden)
25	DF	BEL	William Simba
26	DF	FRA	Valentin Sanson
27	MF	FRA	Yanis Lentini
28	MF	ALG	Yassine Ben Hamed
29	FW	FRA	Nathan Fernandes
30	GK	BDI	Aladin Bizimana
39	FW	BEL	Noah Bailen-Cobo

== Club staff ==
As of 30 June 2023

Position	Name
Chairman	(France) N'Golo Kanté
Chief executive officer	(France) (England) Alex Hayes
Sporting director	(Belgium) Tom Van den Abbeele
Manager	(France) Christian Bracconi
Assistant manager	(Italy) Nicolas Gennarielli
Goalkeeper coach	(France) Jérémy Dumesnil (Belgium) Clément Lommers
Fitness coach	(Belgium) Arnaud Scalco
Video analyst	(Belgium) Grégory Verheyden
Club doctor	(Belgium) Florian Foulon
Physiotherapist	(France) Marc-Antoine Palma (Belgium) Samuel Bodet
Team Manager	(Belgium) Thiebaud Delmelle
Delegate	(Belgium) Georges André
Match equipment and logistics manager	(Belgium) Arnaud Gratia
