= Yassine Khalifi =

Moroccan footballer (born 2005)

Personal information
- Date of birth: 9 August 2005 (age 21)
- Place of birth: Marrakesh, Morocco
- Height: 1.75 m (5 ft 9 in)
- Position: Midfielder

Team information
- Current team: Charleroi
- Number: 40

Youth career
- Marrakech Academy
- Mohammed VI Football Academy
- 2022–2023: → Union Touarga (loan)

Senior career*
Years	Team	Apps	(Gls)
2023	→ Union Touarga (loan)	2	(0)
2023–2025	Lille B	45	(1)
2025–	Charleroi	20	(0)

International career^{‡}
2020–2021	Morocco U17		
2022	Morocco U18	5	(2)
2022–2024	Morocco U20	25	(3)
2023–	Morocco U23	4	(0)
Medal record
Men's football
Representing Morocco
FIFA U-20 World Cup
Winner	2025 Chile
- * Club domestic league appearances and goals as of 1 June 2026 ‡ National team caps and goals as of 14 October 2024

Yassine Khalifi (Arabic: يَاسِين الْخَلِيفِيّ; born 9 August 2005) is a Moroccan professional footballer who plays as a midfielder for Belgian Pro League club Charleroi.

== Club career ==
Khalifi started his career at the Mohammed VI Football Academy, where he featured in various competitions for the side, including the Alkass International Cup. His performances for the youth academy reportedly caught the eye of Spanish side Atlético Madrid. He moved to top-flight Botola side Union Touarga on loan in September 2022. In the same month, he was named by English newspaper The Guardian as one of the best players born in 2005 worldwide.

On 7 September 2023, following two appearances in the Botola for Union Touarga, Khalifi was signed by French Ligue 1 side Lille.

On 14 July 2025, Khalifi signed a contract with Charleroi in Belgium for two years, with an option to extend for two more.

== International career ==
Khalifi was first called up to the Morocco under-17 side in 2020 for a game against Tunisia. This was followed up with another call-up in January 2021, for a training camp. The following year, he was called up by the under-18 side for the Mediterranean Games. He scored a penalty in a 1–1 draw with Spain to send his team through to the semi-finals. He followed this up with another penalty goal in a 2–1 loss to Italy in the semi-final match.

He was called up to the Moroccan under-20 side for the 2022 Arab Cup U-20, and scored in a 4–2 group stage win against Sudan. Later in the same year, he featured in friendly matches against Chile and England. He also featured in the 2022 UNAF U-20 Tournament as Morocco finished third.

== Career statistics ==
As of 5 June 2023.

Appearances and goals by club, season and competition
Club	Season	League			National cup		Other		Total	
Club	Season	Division	Apps	Goals	Apps	Goals	Apps	Goals	Apps	Goals
Union Touarga	2022–23	Botola	2	0	0	0	0	0	2	0
Union Touarga	2023–24	Botola	0	0	0	0	0	0	0	0
Union Touarga	Total		2	0	0	0	0	0	2	0
Lille B	2023–24	Championnat National 2	1	0	—		0	0	1	0
Career total			3	0	0	0	0	0	3	0

== Honours ==
Morocco U20

- FIFA U-20 World Cup: 2025
