= Alex Hayes =

British former sports journalist

Alex Hayes is a former sports journalist who specialised in football reporting in the UK and France. He previously worked for The Independent, TPS/Canal Plus and Sky Sports. He was then a respected football agent, whose clients included Robert Pires and Jérémie Aliadière. He also represented Eric Cantona in the UK. In October 2014, he became executive vice-president of Ligue 1's FC Lorient. He left the role in September 2017. In May 2018, he became the Sporting Director of Royale Union Saint-Gilloise, a Brussels-based football club then owned by Brighton chairman Tony Bloom. Hayes is widely credited for launching the club's incredible success story by finding and totally remodelling the training ground as well as recruiting the then unknown manager Luka Elsner. In 2019, Hayes opted to move to another Belgian club, RE Virton, leading them to their best ever season in 2019-20 when they finished first at the end of the regular season. In 2021, Hayes decided to set up his new sports consultancy, which advises some of the world's biggest clubs as well as one of the game's most exciting young managerial talents, Will Still.

== Biography ==
=== Early career ===
Hayes started his journalistic career in magazines, working for Tatler in London as a features assistant between 1996 and 1998.

=== Newspapers ===
He then joined the Independent on Sunday as a football writer, where he reported on the Premier League, the Champions League, the England national team and European football. During his six years at the paper, he used his great language skills to secure exclusive interviews with world-famous players and managers such as Ronaldinho, Eric Cantona, Thierry Henry, Dennis Bergkamp, Johann Cruyff, Franz Beckenbauer, Serge Blanco, Roger Federer, Pete Sampras, John McEnroe, Didier Drogba, Aime Jacquet and Zinedine Zidane.

=== TV ===
In 2004, Hayes was recruited by the French TV channel TPS Foot (which was bought out by Canal Plus in 2006) to cover the Premier League. During the next three years, he combined his duties as the full-time UK correspondent for TPS and then Canal Plus with match-day presenting, commentating and reporting. He covered more than 250 Barclays Premier League games during his time at TPS/Canal Plus.

After a brief spell at Setanta, during which time he produced as well as directed an exclusive documentary on Didier Drogba, Hayes joined Sky Sports in September 2007 as their Champions League reporter. During his time with Sky, Hayes interviewed such stars as Eric Cantona, Gianfranco Zola, Michel Platini, Karim Benzema, Patrice Evra, Lionel Messi, Gerard Houllier, Didier Drogba and Kaka.

=== Other career highlights ===
Hayes was the UK correspondent for the French sports daily newspaper L'Equipe, as well as the French language radio station RTL.

He was also a regular contributor to The Daily Telegraph newspaper and contributed to the former Icon magazine.

Hayes is the author of two books: The French Revolution, a book about the influence of Gallic footballers in the UK, and Claude Makélélé's "autobiography" Tout Simplement.
