= Ancoub Mze Ali =

French footballer (born 1996)

Personal information
- Full name: Ancoub Mze Ali
- Date of birth: 11 February 1996 (age 30)
- Place of birth: Nice, France
- Height: 1.74 m (5 ft 9 in)
- Position: Midfielder

Team information
- Current team: VSJB

Youth career
- 2003–2008: ES Conque Madeleine
- 2011–2015: Nice

Senior career*
Years	Team	Apps	(Gls)
2015–2019	Nice B	78	(2)
2019–2020	Lens B	16	(0)
2020–	VSJB		

International career^{‡}
2013	France U17	2	(1)
2016–	Comoros	10	(0)
- * Club domestic league appearances and goals as of 19:42, 27 May 2024 (UTC) ‡ National team caps and goals as of 19:42, 27 May 2024 (UTC)

Ancoub Mze Ali (born 11 February 1996) is a footballer who plays for French Régional 1 club VSJB FC and the Comoros national football team.

== International career ==
Mze Ali was born in Nice, France, to Comorian parents. He represented France at the U17 level in 2013.

He debuted for Comoros in a friendly 1–1 draw with Gabon on 15 November 2016.
