= Abdullah Radif =

Saudi Arabian footballer

Personal information
- Full name: Abdullah Hadi Radif
- Date of birth: 20 January 2003 (age 23)
- Place of birth: Riyadh, Saudi Arabia
- Height: 1.87 m (6 ft 2 in)
- Position: Forward

Team information
- Current team: Al-Ahli
- Number: 21

Youth career
- Al-Hilal

Senior career*
Years	Team	Apps	(Gls)
2021–2026	Al-Hilal	5	(0)
2022–2023	→ Al-Taawoun (loan)	15	(2)
2023–2024	→ Al-Shabab (loan)	20	(3)
2024–2025	→ Al-Ettifaq (loan)	28	(3)
2026	→ Al-Fayha (loan)	8	(0)
2026–	Al-Ahli	3	(0)

International career^{‡}
2020–2023	Saudi Arabia U20		
2021–	Saudi Arabia U23		
2021–	Saudi Arabia	23	(2)
- * Club domestic league appearances and goals as of 23 October 2026 ‡ National team caps and goals as of 31 December 2024

Abdullah Hadi Radif (Arabic: عَبْد الله هَادِي رَدِيف; born 20 January 2003) is a Saudi Arabian professional footballer who plays as a forward for Saudi Club Al-Ahli and the Saudi Arabia national team.

== Career ==
Radif began his career at the youth team of Al-Hilal. He signed his first professional contract on 27 January 2021. He made his debut for Al-Hilal on 30 September 2021 in a 1–1 draw against Al-Hazem. On 31 August 2022, Radif joined Al-Taawoun on a one-year loan. He made his debut for Al-Taawoun as well as score his first goal in a 2–0 league win against Al-Wehda. He ended his loan spell at Al-Taawoun making 16 appearances in all competitions and scoring twice. On 6 September 2023, Radif joined Al-Shabab on a one-year loan. On 2 September 2024, Radif joined Al-Ettifaq on a one-year loan. On 2 February 2026, Radif joined Al-Fayha on a six-month loan.

== Career statistics ==
=== Club ===
As of 31 May 2024.

Club	Season	League		Cup		Continental		Other		Total	
Club	Season	Apps	Goals	Apps	Goals	Apps	Goals	Apps	Goals	Apps	Goals
Al-Hilal	2020–21	0	0	0	0	0	0	0	0	0	0
Al-Hilal	2021–22	2	0	0	0	1	0	0	0	3	0
Al-Hilal	2023–24	2	0	0	0	0	0	3 (Note: Appearances in Arab Club Champions Cup)	0	5	0
Al-Hilal	Total	4	0	0	0	1	0	3	0	8	0
Al-Taawoun (loan)	2022–23	15	2	1	0	—		—		16	2
Al Shabab (loan)	2023–24	20	3	2	0	—		—		22	3
Career total		39	5	3	0	1	0	3	0	46	5

=== International ===
No.	Date	Venue	Opponent	Score	Result	Competition
1.	16 November 2023	Prince Abdullah bin Jalawi Stadium, Hofuf, Saudi Arabia	Pakistan	4–0	4–0	2026 FIFA World Cup qualification
2.	30 January 2024	Education City Stadium, Al Rayyan, Qatar	South Korea	1–0	1–1 (a.e.t.)	2023 AFC Asian Cup

== Honours ==
Al-Hilal

- Saudi Pro League: 2021–22
- Saudi Super Cup: 2021
- AFC Champions League: 2021

Saudi Arabia U20

- Arab Cup U-20: 2021, 2022

Saudi Arabia U23

- AFC U-23 Asian Cup: 2022
