= Yassine Ben Hamed =

Association football player (born 2003)

Personal information
- Date of birth: 24 March 2003 (age 23)
- Place of birth: Villeurbanne, France
- Height: 1.75 m (5 ft 9 in)
- Position: Left-back

Team information
- Current team: Virton
- Number: 28

Youth career
- 2009–2015: AS Villeurbanne EL
- 2015–2017: Lyon
- 2017–2021: Lille

Senior career*
Years	Team	Apps	(Gls)
2020–2021	Lille II	3	(0)
2021–2022	Royal Antwerp	1	(0)
2022–2025	Young Reds Antwerp	18	(1)
2025	Aubagne Air Bel	3	(0)
2026	Paradou AC	4	(0)
2026–	Virton	0	(0)

International career^{‡}
2018–2019	France U16	9	(0)
2019	France U17	3	(0)
2021	Algeria U20	4	(1)
- * Club domestic league appearances and goals as of 20 September 2026 ‡ National team caps and goals as of 23:00, 22 July 2022 (UTC)

Yassine Ben Hamed (Arabic: ياسين بن حامد; born 24 March 2003) is a professional footballer who plays as a left-back for Challenger Pro League club Virton in Belgium. Born in France, he initially represented them at youth international level, before switching his allegiance to Algeria.

== Club career ==
Ben Hamed is a youth academy graduate of Lille. On 7 July 2021, he joined Belgian club Royal Antwerp on a four-year deal. He made his professional debut on 25 July in a 3–2 league defeat against Mechelen. On 31 January 2026, he joined Paradou AC. On 13 July 2026, he joined Belgian club Royal Excelsior Virton.

== International career ==
Ben Hamed is a former French youth international. He was part of French squad during 2020 UEFA European Under-17 Championship qualification matches. He played for Algeria U20 at the 2022 Arab Cup U-20.

== Personal life ==
Ben Hamed is of Algerian descent.

== Career statistics ==
=== Club ===
As of 25 July 2021

Appearances and goals by club, season and competition
Club	Season	League			Cup		Continental		Total	
Club	Season	Division	Apps	Goals	Apps	Goals	Apps	Goals	Apps	Goals
Lille II	2020–21	Championnat National 3	3	0	—		—		3	0
Royal Antwerp	2021–22	Belgian First Division A	1	0	0	0	0	0	1	0
Career total			4	0	0	0	0	0	4	0
