= Ali Alrida Ismail =

Lebanese footballer (born 2003)

Personal information
- Full name: Ali Alrida Mohamad Ismail
- Date of birth: 8 July 2003 (age 23)
- Place of birth: Meiss Ej Jabal, Lebanon
- Height: 1.78 m (5 ft 10 in)
- Position: Right-back

Team information
- Current team: Nejmeh
- Number: 2

Youth career
- –2022: Nejmeh

Senior career*
Years	Team	Apps	(Gls)
2022–	Nejmeh	51	(1)
2022	→ AC Sporting (loan)	8	(0)

International career^{‡}
2021	Lebanon U18		(0)
2021–2022	Lebanon U20		(1)
2022–2026	Lebanon U23	14	(0)
2026–	Lebanon	3	(0)
Medal record
Men's football
Representing Lebanon
WAFF U-18 Championship
Silver medal – second place	2021	U-18 Team
- * Club domestic league appearances and goals as of 23 October 2026 ‡ National team caps and goals as of 17 November 2026

Ali Alrida Mohamad Ismail (Arabic: علي الرضا محمد اسماعيل; born 8 July 2003) is a Lebanese footballer who plays as a right-back for Lebanese Premier League club Nejmeh and the Lebanon national team.

== Club career ==
After progressing through Nejmeh's youth system, Ismail moved into senior football during the 2021–22 season, when he was loaned to AC Sporting in February 2022. He made eight appearances in the Lebanese Premier League. Upon his return to Nejmeh in May 2022, Ismail established himself as the club's starting right-back. He scored his first goal for Nejmeh on 3 July 2025, helping the club defeat Ahed 4–1.

== International career ==
Ismail represented Lebanon at various youth levels. In 2021, he was part of the Lebanon national under-18's squad for the WAFF U-18 Championship, where Lebanon reached the final before finishing as runners-up to Iraq. Ismail was called up to the under-20s for the 2021 Arab Cup U-20, scoring against Senegal, and to the under-23s for the 2026 AFC U-23 Asian Cup qualification, where he contributed to the team's first-ever qualification for the final tournament. He was called up for the final tournament, held in Saudi Arabia in January 2026.

Ismail received his first call-up to the senior national team from head coach Madjid Bougherra in September 2026, ahead of friendly matches against the Maldives and Kyrgyzstan in October. He made his debut on 1 October, in a 6–0 win against the Maldives.

== Style of play ==
A full-back, Ismail has played on both sides of the defence. He was described as a left-back early in his senior career and later primarily played as a right-back.

== Personal life ==
Ismail is the son of Mohamad Ali Ismail, the commander of Hezbollah's rocket unit in southern Lebanon, who was killed in September 2024 during the Israel–Hezbollah war.

== Career statistics ==
=== Club ===
As of match played 23 October 2026

Appearances and goals by club, season and competition
Club	Season	League			Lebanon Cup		League cup (Note: Includes Lebanese Elite Cup, Lebanese Federation Cup)		Continental		Other		Total	
Club	Season	Division	Apps	Goals	Apps	Goals	Apps	Goals	Apps	Goals	Apps	Goals	Apps	Goals
Nejmeh	2021–22	Lebanese Premier League	—		—		0	0	—		—		0	0
Nejmeh	2022–23	Lebanese Premier League	18	0	2	0	1	0	2 (Note: Appearances in AFC Cup)	0	—		23	0
Nejmeh	2023–24	Lebanese Premier League	7	0	—		1	0	3	0	1 (Note: Appearance in Lebanese Super Cup)	0	12	0
Nejmeh	2024–25	Lebanese Premier League	18	1	—		—		3 (Note: Appearances in AFC Challenge League)	0	0	0	21	1
Nejmeh	2025–26	Lebanese Premier League	7	0	2	0	—		2 (Note: Appearances in National Solidarity Tournament)	0	—		11	0
Nejmeh	2026–27	Lebanese Premier League	1	0	2	1	—		0	0	—		3	1
Nejmeh	Total		51	1	6	1	2	0	10	0	1	0	70	2
AC Sporting (loan)	2021–22	Lebanese Premier League	8	0	—		—		—		—		8	0
Career total			59	1	6	1	2	0	10	0	1	0	78	2

=== International ===
As of match played 17 November 2026

Appearances and goals by national team and year
National team	Year	Apps	Goals
Lebanon	2026	3	0
Total		3	0

== Honours ==
Nejmeh

- Lebanese Premier League: 2023–24
- Lebanese FA Cup: 2022–23, 2025–26
- Lebanese Super Cup: 2023, 2024

Lebanon U18

- WAFF U-18 Championship runner-up: 2021
