= Paul Wade (footballer, born 2000) =

French footballer (born 2000)

Personal information
- Date of birth: 17 April 2000 (age 26)
- Place of birth: Cagnes-sur-Mer, France
- Height: 1.78 m (5 ft 10 in)
- Position: Midfielder

Team information
- Current team: Virton
- Number: 10

Youth career
- 2005–2013: ASCC Football
- 2013–2019: Nice

Senior career*
Years	Team	Apps	(Gls)
2018–2023	Nice B	80	(28)
2019	Nice	1	(0)
2023–2025	Nîmes	6	(0)
2024–2025	→ Le Puy (loan)	27	(4)
2025–2026	Le Puy	16	(4)
2026	Châteauroux	14	(2)
2026–	Virton	4	(1)
- * Club domestic league appearances and goals as of 20 September 2026

Paul Wade (born 17 April 2000) is a French professional footballer who plays as a midfielder for Challenger Pro League club Virton in Belgium.

== Career ==
Wade is a youth product of Nice, having joined at the age of 13 from ASCC Football. He made his professional debut for Nice in a 1–0 Ligue 1 win against Lyon on 10 February 2019 coming on for Allan Saint-Maximin in the 83rd minute.

On 14 June 2024, Wade moved on loan to Le Puy.

== Career statistics ==
As of match played 10 November 2023

Appearances and goals by club, season and competition
Club	Season	League			Cup		Other		Total	
Club	Season	Division	Apps	Goals	Apps	Goals	Apps	Goals	Apps	Goals
Nice B	2017–18	National 2	1	0	—		—		1	0
Nice B	2018–19	National 2	12	0	—		—		12	0
Nice B	2019–20	National 3	15	3	—		—		15	3
Nice B	2020–21	National 3	5	4	—		—		5	4
Nice B	2021–22	National 3	26	17	—		—		26	17
Nice B	2022–23	National 3	21	4	—		—		21	4
Nice B	Total		80	28	—		—		80	28
Nice	2018–19	Ligue 1	1	0	0	0	0	0	1	0
Nîmes	2023–24	National	5	0	0	0	—		5	0
Career total			86	0	0	0	0	0	86	0
