= Rafik Messali =

Algerian footballer (born 2003)

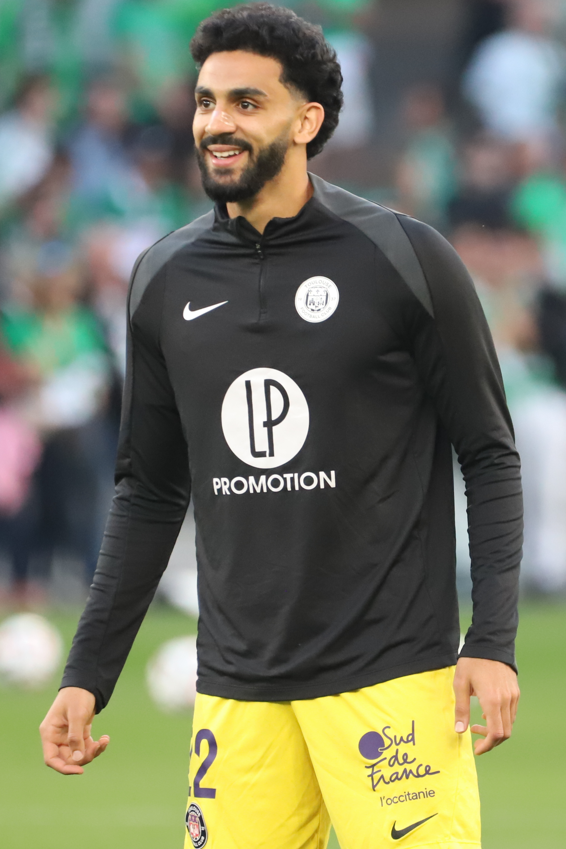
- Messali with Toulouse in 2025

Personal information
- Date of birth: 28 April 2003 (age 23)
- Place of birth: Toulouse, France
- Height: 1.77 m (5 ft 10 in)
- Position: Right-back

Team information
- Current team: Toulouse
- Number: 22

Youth career
- 2009–2010: Miral
- 2010–2011: US Ramonville
- 2011–2013: Castanet-Tolosan
- 2013–2024: Toulouse

Senior career*
Years	Team	Apps	(Gls)
2021–2024	Toulouse II	28	(0)
2024–	Toulouse	25	(0)

International career^{‡}
2021–2023	Algeria U20	12	(1)
- * Club domestic league appearances and goals as of 19 May 2026 ‡ National team caps and goals as of 15:54, 31 January 2025 (UTC)

Rafik Messali (born 28 April 2003) is a professional footballer who plays as a right-back for Ligue 1 club Toulouse. Born in France, he is a youth international for Algeria.

== Career ==
Messali is a product of the youth academies of Miral, US Ramonville and Castanet-Tolosan before joining Toulouse's youth side in 2013. He was promoted to their reserves in 2021. On 12 September 2024, he signed his first professional contract with the club. He made his senior and professional debut for Toulouse as a substitute in a 2–0 Ligue 1 win over Rennes on 10 November 2024.

== International career ==
Born in France, Messali is of Algerian descent. He is a youth international for Algeria, having played for the Algeria U20s at the 2022 UNAF U-20 Tournament.
