= Monir Al Badarin =

Association football player (born 2005)

Personal information
- Date of birth: 8 July 2005 (age 21)
- Place of birth: Stara Zagora, Bulgaria
- Height: 1.65 m (5 ft 5 in)
- Position: Midfielder

Team information
- Current team: Vihren Sandanski
- Number: 7

Youth career
- –2016: Rozova Dolina Kazanlak
- 2016–2020: Beroe Stara Zagora
- 2020–2021: Spartak Pleven
- 2021: Pirin Blagoevgrad
- 2021–2022: Botev Plovdiv

Senior career*
Years	Team	Apps	(Gls)
2022–2023	Botev Plovdiv II	36	(2)
2022–2023	Botev Plovdiv	2	(0)
2023–2024	Shabab Alsamu		
2024	Rozova Dolina		
2024–2025	Spartak Pleven	39	(1)
2026–	Vihren Sandanski	21	(4)

International career^{‡}
2021	Bulgaria U17	2	(0)
2022–2024	Palestine U20	15	(3)
- * Club domestic league appearances and goals as of 12:03, 14 September 2026 (UTC) ‡ National team caps and goals as of 12:05, 14 September 2026 (UTC)

Monir Al Badarin (Arabic: منير البدارين; Bulgarian: Монир Ал Бадарин; born 8 July 2005) is a professional footballer who plays as a midfielder for Vihren Sandanski. Born in Bulgaria, he represents Palestine internationally.

== Club career ==
Al Badarin was born in Stara Zagora, Bulgaria. He started his youth career at an early age at Rozova Dolina Kazanlak, before playing four years for Beroe Stara Zagora and one year for Beroe Stara Zagora. After a short stay at Pirin Blagoevgrad, Al Badarin was signed by Botev Plovdiv.

His performances at the youth level caught the attention of senior head coach Azrudin Valentić, who called him up to the winter camp with the first team. On 1 February 2022, Al Badrin signed his first professional contract with Botev Plovdiv. He became a regular for the reserve team, before making his debut with the first team on 22 May 2022, in the last match of the 2021–22 First League season against Slavia Sofia. Monir left Botev on 5 July 2023 after mutual agreement.

== International career ==
Born in Bulgaria, Monir is also eligible to Palestine at the international level due to his origins. He was called up for Bulgaria U17 team in April 2021. In July 2022, he joined Palestine U20 and made his debut on 17 July, scoring a goal in a friendly match against Oman U20. He scored once again on 26 July, in a match against Sudan U20.

== Style of play ==
Al Badrin can play as either a midfielder or forward.

== Career statistics ==
As of 5 July 2023

Club	Season	League			Bulgarian Cup		Continental		Other		Total	
Club	Season	Division	Apps	Goals	Apps	Goals	Apps	Goals	Apps	Goals	Apps	Goals
Botev Plovdiv II	2021–22	Second League	12	2	—		—		—		12	2
Botev Plovdiv II	2022–23	Second League	24	0	—		—		—		11	0
Botev Plovdiv II	Total		36	2	0	0	0	0	0	0	36	2
Botev Plovdiv	2021–22	First League	1	0	0	0	—		—		1	0
Botev Plovdiv	2022–23	First League	1	0	0	0	—		—		1	0
Botev Plovdiv	Total		2	0	0	0	0	0	0	0	2	0
Career total			38	2	0	0	0	0	0	0	38	2
