= Oussama Amar =

Algerian footballer (born 2003)

Personal information
- Date of birth: August 23, 2003 (age 23)
- Place of birth: Montpellier, France
- Position: Forward

Team information
- Current team: Al-Nahda

Youth career
- –2019: Montpellier
- 2019–2022: Lyon

Senior career*
Years	Team	Apps	(Gls)
2021–2022	Lyon II	5	(0)
2022	Valencia	0	(0)
2022–2024	Al Wasl	2	(0)
2024–	Al-Nahda	7	(2)

International career^{‡}
2022	Algeria U20	5	(1)
- * Club domestic league appearances and goals as of 15:13, 3 February 2025 (UTC) ‡ National team caps and goals as of 15:13, 3 February 2025 (UTC)

Oussama Amar (born August 23, 2003) is a professional footballer who plays as a forward for Oman Professional League club Al-Nahda. Born in France, he represents Algeria at international level.

== Career ==
In January 2022, Amar signed with Valencia.
