= Hazza Subait =

Emirati football player (born 2003)

Hazza Subait هزاع سبيت
Personal information
- Full name: Hazza Subait Khater Al-Junaibi
- Date of birth: 9 March 2003 (age 23)
- Place of birth: United Arab Emirates
- Height: 1.73 m (5 ft 8 in)
- Position: Forward

Team information
- Current team: Baniyas
- Number: 73

Youth career
- –2020: Al-Jazira

Senior career*
Years	Team	Apps	(Gls)
2020–2025	Al-Jazira	3	(0)
2024	→ Al Dhafra (loan)		
2025–	Baniyas	0	(0)

International career
- UAE U20
- * Club domestic league appearances and goals

Hazza Subait (Arabic:هزاع سبيت) (born 9 March 2003) is an Emirati footballer who plays for Baniyas as a forward.

== Career ==
Hazza Subait started his career at Al-Jazira and is a product of the Al-Jazira's youth system, he is among the UAE U20 players. On 2 February 2020, Hazza Subait made his professional debut for Al Jazira against Al-Wahda in the Pro League, replacing Khalifa Al Hammadi .

== Personal life ==
Born in Abu Dhabi, Hazza is the second son of former UAE international footballer and former FC Al Ain player Subait Khater
