= Youssef Hassan (footballer) =

Egyptian footballer

Personal information
- Full name: Youssef Ahmed Hassan Ahmed Mohamed
- Date of birth: 20 June 2003 (age 23)
- Height: 1.78 m (5 ft 10 in)
- Position: Striker

Team information
- Current team: Zamalek SC

Youth career
- –2020: El Mokawloon

Senior career*
Years	Team	Apps	(Gls)
2020–2021	El Mokawloon	6	(0)
2021–2022	Wadi Degla	0	(0)
2022–	Zamalek	4	(0)

International career^{‡}
2023–	Egypt U20	3	(0)
- * Club domestic league appearances and goals as of 23:03, 25 February 2023 (UTC) ‡ National team caps and goals as of 23:03, 25 February 2023 (UTC)

Youssef Ahmed Hassan Ahmed Mohamed (born 20 June 2003) is an Egyptian professional footballer who plays as a striker for Egyptian Premier League club Zamalek SC.

== Career statistics ==
=== Club ===
As of 22 August 2020.

Club	Season	League			Cup		Continental		Other		Total	
Club	Season	Division	Apps	Goals	Apps	Goals	Apps	Goals	Apps	Goals	Apps	Goals
El Mokawloon	2019–20	Egyptian Premier League	1	0	0	0	0	0	0	0	1	0
Career total			1	0	0	0	0	0	0	0	1	0
