= 2002 AFC Youth Championship qualification =

Tournament details
- Host countries: Syria; United Arab Emirates; Kuwait; India; Pakistan; Uzbekistan; Japan; South Korea; Thailand; Malaysia; Singapore
- Dates: 13 March – 31 July 2002
- Teams: 40 (from 1 confederation)
- Venue: (in 11 host cities)

Tournament statistics
- Matches played: 57
- Goals scored: 252 (4.42 per match)

The 2002 AFC Youth Championship qualifying competition is a men's under-19 football competition that determined the eleven teams joining the automatically qualified hosts Qatar in the 2002 AFC Youth Championship final tournament.

A total of 40 AFC member national teams entered the qualifying competition. Players born on or after 1 January 1983 are eligible to participate.

== Format ==
In each group, teams play each other once at a centralised venue. The eleven group winners qualify for the final tournament.

== Teams ==
Zone	Berths	Automatic qualifiers	Teams entering qualification
West Zone	7	**Qatar**	Bahrain; **Bangladesh**; Bhutan; **India**; Iran; Iraq; Jordan; Kuwait; Kyrgyzstan; Lebanon; Maldives; Nepal; Oman; Pakistan; Palestine; **Saudi Arabia**; Sri Lanka; **Syria**; Tajikistan; Turkmenistan; United Arab Emirates; **Uzbekistan**; Yemen
East Zone	5		Brunei; Cambodia; **China**; Chinese Taipei; Guam; Hong Kong; Indonesia; **Japan**; Laos; Macau; Malaysia; Mongolia; Myanmar; Philippines; Singapore; **South Korea**; **Thailand**; **Vietnam**

Notes

- Teams in **bold** qualified for the final tournament.

Did not enter
West Zone	Afghanistan; Lebanon (withdrew)
East Zone	North Korea (withdrew)

== Groups ==
The qualifying round was played by 31 July 2002.

=== Group 1 ===
Pos	Team	Pld	W	D	L	GF	GA	GD	Pts	Qualification
1	Syria (H)	3	2	1	0	9	3	+6	**7**	Final tournament
2	Oman	3	1	1	1	5	8	−3	**4**	
3	Iran	3	1	0	2	6	8	−2	**3**	
4	Yemen	3	0	2	1	6	7	−1	**2**	

Source: AFC
Rules for classification: Qualification tiebreakers
(H) Hosts
19 July 2002

Iran	4–3	Yemen

Aleppo
19 July 2002

Syria	5–1	Oman

Aleppo

21 July 2002

Oman	2–1	Iran

Aleppo
21 July 2002

Syria	1–1	Yemen

Aleppo

23 July 2002

Yemen	2–2	Oman

Aleppo
23 July 2002

Syria	3–1	Iran

Aleppo

=== Group 2 ===
Pos	Team	Pld	W	D	L	GF	GA	GD	Pts	Qualification
1	United Arab Emirates (H)	2	2	0	0	8	2	+6	**6**	Final tournament
2	Iraq	2	1	0	1	3	4	−1	**3**	
3	Palestine	2	0	0	2	3	8	−5	**0**	
4	Lebanon	0	0	0	0	0	0	0	**0**	Withdrew

Source: AFC
Rules for classification: Qualification tiebreakers
(H) Hosts
25 July 2002

United Arab Emirates	3–0	Iraq

Al Ain

28 July 2002

Iraq	3–1	Palestine

Al Ain

31 July 2002

United Arab Emirates	5–2	Palestine

Al Ain

=== Group 3 ===
Pos	Team	Pld	W	D	L	GF	GA	GD	Pts	Qualification
1	Saudi Arabia	3	3	0	0	11	2	+9	**9**	Final tournament
2	Kuwait (H)	3	1	1	1	13	4	+9	**4**	
3	Jordan	3	1	0	2	1	15	−14	**3**	
4	Bahrain	3	0	1	2	1	5	−4	**1**	

Source: AFC
Rules for classification: Qualification tiebreakers
(H) Hosts
18 July 2002

Kuwait	1–1	Bahrain

Kuwait City
19 July 2002

Saudi Arabia	5–0	Jordan

Kuwait City

20 July 2002

Kuwait	10–0	Jordan

Kuwait City
20 July 2002

Saudi Arabia	3–0	Bahrain

Kuwait City

22 July 2002

Jordan	1–0	Bahrain

Kuwait City
22 July 2002

Kuwait	2–3	Saudi Arabia

Kuwait City

=== Group 4 ===
Pos	Team	Pld	W	D	L	GF	GA	GD	Pts	Qualification
1	India (H)	3	2	1	0	8	1	+7	**7**	Final tournament
2	Tajikistan	3	2	1	0	5	0	+5	**7**	
3	Bhutan	3	0	1	2	1	7	−6	**1**	
4	Kyrgyzstan	3	0	1	2	0	6	−6	**1**	

Source: AFC
Rules for classification: Qualification tiebreakers
(H) Hosts
10 July 2002

Kyrgyzstan	0–2	Tajikistan

Kolkata
10 July 2002

India	4–1	Bhutan

Kolkata

12 July 2002

India	0–0	Tajikistan

Kolkata
12 July 2002

Kyrgyzstan	0–0	Bhutan

Kolkata

14 July 2002

Tajikistan	3–0	Bhutan

Kolkata
14 July 2002

India	4–0	Kyrgyzstan

Kolkata

=== Group 5 ===
Pos	Team	Pld	W	D	L	GF	GA	GD	Pts	Qualification
1	Bangladesh	3	2	1	0	8	2	+6	**7**	Final tournament
2	Pakistan (H)	3	2	1	0	8	3	+5	**7**	
3	Sri Lanka	3	1	0	2	4	4	0	**3**	
4	Maldives	3	0	0	3	0	11	−11	**0**	

Source: AFC
Rules for classification: Qualification tiebreakers
(H) Hosts
25 April 2002

Sri Lanka	0–2	Bangladesh

People's Football Stadium, Karachi
25 April 2002

Pakistan	4–0	Maldives

People's Football Stadium, Karachi

27 April 2002

Maldives	0–4	Bangladesh

People's Football Stadium, Karachi
27 April 2002

Pakistan	2–1	Sri Lanka

People's Football Stadium, Karachi

29 April 2002

Maldives	0–3	Sri Lanka
	Report	R. K. Lenard 22', 55'; N. Charaka 43'

People's Football Stadium, Karachi
29 April 2002

Bangladesh	2–2	Pakistan
Aziz 70'; Sowkat Khan 86'	Report	Ahmed 47', 62'

People's Football Stadium, Karachi
Attendance: 15,000

=== Group 6 ===
Pos	Team	Pld	W	D	L	GF	GA	GD	Pts	Qualification
1	Uzbekistan (H)	2	2	0	0	19	0	+19	**6**	Final tournament
2	Turkmenistan	2	1	0	1	1	7	−6	**3**	
3	Nepal	2	0	0	2	0	13	−13	**0**	

Source: AFC
Rules for classification: Qualification tiebreakers
(H) Hosts
6 May 2002

Turkmenistan	1–0	Nepal

Tashkent

8 May 2002

Uzbekistan	7–0	Turkmenistan

Tashkent

10 May 2002

Uzbekistan	12–0	Nepal

Tashkent

=== Group 7 ===
Pos	Team	Pld	W	D	L	GF	GA	GD	Pts	Qualification
1	Japan (H)	3	3	0	0	22	0	+22	**9**	Final tournament
2	Chinese Taipei	3	2	0	1	13	6	+7	**6**	
3	Laos	3	1	0	2	8	7	+1	**3**	
4	Mongolia	3	0	0	3	0	30	−30	**0**	

Source: AFC
Rules for classification: Qualification tiebreakers
(H) Hosts
8 May 2002

Laos	1–2	Chinese Taipei

Tokyo
8 May 2002

Mongolia	0–12	Japan

Tokyo

10 May 2002

Laos	7–0	Mongolia

Tokyo
10 May 2002

Chinese Taipei	0–5	Japan

Tokyo

12 May 2002

Mongolia	0–11	Chinese Taipei

Tokyo
12 May 2002

Laos	0–5	Japan

Tokyo

=== Group 8 ===
Pos	Team	Pld	W	D	L	GF	GA	GD	Pts	Qualification
1	South Korea (H)	2	2	0	0	26	0	+26	**6**	Final tournament
2	Brunei	2	1	0	1	6	9	−3	**3**	
3	Guam	2	0	0	2	0	23	−23	**0**	
4	North Korea	0	0	0	0	0	0	0	**0**	Withdrew

Source: AFC
Rules for classification: Qualification tiebreakers
(H) Hosts
27 March 2002

South Korea	9–0	Brunei

Paju

29 March 2002

Brunei	6–0	Guam

Paju

31 March 2002

South Korea	17–0	Guam

Paju

=== Group 9 ===
Pos	Team	Pld	W	D	L	GF	GA	GD	Pts	Qualification
1	Thailand (H)	3	2	1	0	15	1	+14	**7**	Final tournament
2	Indonesia	3	2	1	0	5	0	+5	**7**	
3	Hong Kong	3	1	0	2	5	6	−1	**3**	
4	Philippines	3	0	0	3	2	20	−18	**0**	

Source: AFC
Rules for classification: Qualification tiebreakers
(H) Hosts
2 April 2002

Hong Kong	0–1	Indonesia

Bangkok
2 April 2002

Thailand	12–0	Philippines

Bangkok

4 April 2002

Hong Kong	4–2	Philippines

Bangkok
4 April 2002

Thailand	0–0	Indonesia

Bangkok

6 April 2002

Philippines	0–4	Indonesia

Bangkok
6 April 2002

Thailand	3–1	Hong Kong

Bangkok

=== Group 10 ===
Pos	Team	Pld	W	D	L	GF	GA	GD	Pts	Qualification
1	Vietnam	3	3	0	0	15	2	+13	**9**	Final tournament
2	Malaysia (H)	3	1	1	1	7	3	+4	**4**	
3	Cambodia	3	1	1	1	2	5	−3	**4**	
4	Macau	3	0	0	3	1	15	−14	**0**	

Source: AFC
Rules for classification: Qualification tiebreakers
(H) Hosts
4 May 2002

Cambodia	0–5	Vietnam

Kelana Jaya
4 May 2002

Malaysia	6–0	Macau

Kelana Jaya

6 May 2002

Vietnam	7–1	Macau

Kelana Jaya
6 May 2002

Cambodia	0–0	Malaysia

Kelana Jaya

8 May 2002

Cambodia	2–0	Macau

Kelana Jaya
8 May 2002

Malaysia	1–3	Vietnam

Kelana Jaya

=== Group 11 ===
Pos	Team	Pld	W	D	L	GF	GA	GD	Pts	Qualification
1	China	2	1	1	0	3	1	+2	**4**	Final tournament
2	Myanmar	2	1	1	0	2	1	+1	**4**	
3	Singapore (H)	2	0	0	2	0	3	−3	**0**	

Source: AFC
Rules for classification: Qualification tiebreakers
(H) Hosts
13 March 2002

Singapore	0–1	Myanmar

Singapore

15 March 2002

China	1–1	Myanmar

Singapore

17 March 2002

Singapore	0–2	China

Singapore

== Qualified teams ==
The following twelve teams qualify for the final tournament.

Team	Qualified as	Qualified on	Previous appearances in AFC Youth Championship^{1}
Qatar	Hosts	2002	8 (1980, 1986, 1988, 1990, 1992, 1994, 1996, 1998)
Syria	Group 1 winners	23 July 2002	5 (1975, 1988, 1990, **1994**, 1996)
United Arab Emirates	Group 2 winners	31 July 2002	6 (1982, 1985, 1988, 1992, 1996, 2000)
Saudi Arabia	Group 3 winners	22 July 2002	7 (1973, 1977, 1978, 1985, **1986**, **1992**, 1998)
India	Group 4 winners	14 July 2002	19 (1963, 1964, 1965, 1966, 1967, 1968, 1971, 1972, 1973, **1974**, 1975, 1976, 1977, 1978, 1978, 1986, 1990, 1992, 1996, 1998)
Bangladesh	Group 5 winners	29 April 2002	5 (1975, 1977, 1978, 1980, 1996)
Uzbekistan	Group 6 winners	10 May 2002	0 (debut)
Japan	Group 7 winners	12 May 2002	28 (1959, 1960, 1961, 1962, 1963, 1964, 1965, 1966, 1967, 1968, 1969, 1970, 1971, 1972, 1973, 1974, 1975, 1976, 1977, 1978, 1980, 1988, 1990, 1992, 1994, 1996, 1998, 2000)
South Korea	Group 8 winners	31 March 2002	29 (**1959**, **1960**, 1961, 1962, **1963**, 1964, 1965, 1966, 1967, 1968, 1969, 1970, 1971, 1972, 1973, 1974, 1976, 1977, **1978**, **1980**, **1982**, 1986, 1988, **1990**, 1992, 1994, **1996**, **1998**, 2000)
Thailand	Group 9 winners	6 April 2002	24 (1959, 1960, 1961, 1962, 1963, 1964, 1965, 1966, 1967, 1968, 1969, 1970, 1971, 1972, 1973, 1974, 1976, 1980, 1985, 1992, 1994, 1996, 1998, 2000)
Vietnam	Group 10 winners	8 May 2002	11 (1961, 1962, 1963, 1964, 1965, 1967, 1968, 1969, 1970, 1971, 1974)
China	Group 11 winners	17 March 2002	9 (1975, 1976, 1978, 1982, 1985, 1988, 1996, 1998, 2000)

^{1} Bold indicates champions for that year. Italic indicates hosts for that year.
