= Macau national under-20 football team =

Special Administrative Region U-20 association football team

Macau
- Nickname: Verdes (The Greens)
- Association: Associação de Futebol de Macau-China
- Confederation: AFC (Asia)
- Sub-confederation: EAFF (East Asia)
- Head coach: Emmanuel Noruega (caretaker)
- Home stadium: Estádio Campo Desportivo
- FIFA code: MAC
First colours	Second colours

First international
- Hong Kong 5–1 Macau (Qingdao, China; 1 August 1986)

Biggest win
- Northern Mariana Islands 0–4 Macau (Dededo, Guam; 12 August 2013); Macau 2–0 Guam (Macau; 25 November 2005); Macau 4–3 Laos (Bangkok, Thailand; 6 November 2009); Macau 2–1 São Tomé and Príncipe (Vasco da Gama, India; 23 January 2014); Macau 1–0 Laos (Zhubei, Taiwan; 6 November 2017)

Biggest defeat
- North Korea 18–0 Macau (Kunming, China; 26 April 1990); Thailand 18–0 Macau (Bangkok, Thailand; 13 May 1996)

The Macau national under-20 football team is the under-20 association football team of Macau. It is controlled by the Football Association of Macau, China.

== Competitive record ==
=== FIFA U-20 World Cup ===
FIFA U-20 World Cup
Year	Round	Pld	W	D	L	GF	GA	GD
(Tunisia) 1977	Did not enter							
(Japan) 1979	Did not enter							
(Australia) 1981	Did not enter							
(Mexico) 1983	Did not enter							
(Soviet Union) 1985	Did not enter							
(Chile) 1987	Did not qualify							
(Saudi Arabia) 1989	Did not qualify							
(Portugal) 1991	Did not qualify							
(Australia) 1993	Did not qualify							
(Qatar) 1995	Did not qualify							
(Malaysia) 1997	Did not qualify							
(Nigeria) 1999	Did not qualify							
(Argentina) 2001	Did not qualify							
(United Arab Emirates) 2003	Did not qualify							
(Netherlands) 2005	Did not qualify							
(Canada) 2007	Did not qualify							
(Egypt) 2009	Did not qualify							
(Colombia) 2011	Did not qualify							
(Turkey) 2013	Did not qualify							
(New Zealand) 2015	Did not qualify							
(South Korea) 2017	Did not qualify							
(Poland) 2019	Did not qualify							
(Indonesia) 2021	Cancelled							
(Argentina) 2023	Did not qualify							
(Chile) 2025	Did not qualify							
(Azerbaijan) (Uzbekistan) 2027	Did not qualify							
(Georgia (country)) (Armenia) 2029	To be determined							
Total	–	0/25	0	0	0	0	0	0

=== AFC U-20 Asian Cup ===
AFC U-20 Asian Cup record									Qualification record					
Year	Round	Pos	Pld	W	D	L	GF	GA	Pld	W	D	L	GF	GA
(Malaysia) 1959	Did not enter								Did not enter					
(Malaysia) 1960	Did not enter								Did not enter					
(Thailand) 1961	Did not enter								Did not enter					
(Thailand) 1962	Did not enter								Did not enter					
(Malaysia) 1963	Did not enter								Did not enter					
(South Vietnam) 1964	Did not enter								Did not enter					
(Japan) 1965	Did not enter								Did not enter					
(Philippines) 1966	Did not enter								Did not enter					
(Thailand) 1967	Did not enter								Did not enter					
(South Korea) 1968	Did not enter								Did not enter					
(Thailand) 1969	Did not enter								Did not enter					
(Philippines) 1970	Did not enter								Did not enter					
(Japan) 1971	Did not enter								Did not enter					
(Thailand) 1972	Did not enter								Did not enter					
(Iran) 1973	Did not enter								Did not enter					
(Thailand) 1974	Did not enter								Did not enter					
(Kuwait) 1975	Did not enter								Did not enter					
(Thailand) 1976	Did not enter								Did not enter					
(Iran) 1977	Did not enter								Did not enter					
(Bangladesh) 1978	Did not enter								Did not enter					
(Thailand) 1980	Did not enter								Did not enter					
(Thailand) 1982	Did not enter								Did not enter					
(United Arab Emirates) 1985	Did not enter								Did not enter					
(Saudi Arabia) 1986	Did not qualify								3	0	0	3	1	24
(Qatar) 1988	Did not qualify								6	0	0	6	1	39
(Indonesia) 1990	Did not qualify								3	0	0	3	0	39
(United Arab Emirates) 1992	Did not qualify								3	0	0	3	3	15
(Indonesia) 1994	Did not enter								Did not enter					
(South Korea) 1996	Did not qualify								3	0	0	3	0	22
(Thailand) 1998	Did not qualify								Unknown					
(Iran) 2000	Did not qualify								4	0	0	4	1	29
(Qatar) 2002	Did not qualify								3	0	0	3	1	15
(Malaysia) 2004	Did not qualify								2	0	0	2	0	10
(India) 2006	Did not qualify								2	1	0	1	3	9
(Saudi Arabia) 2008	Did not qualify								4	0	0	4	0	25
(China) 2010	Did not qualify								5	1	0	4	7	17
(United Arab Emirates) 2012	Did not qualify								4	0	1	3	0	20
(Myanmar) 2014	Did not qualify								3	0	0	3	0	14
(Bahrain) 2016	Did not qualify								3	0	0	3	1	17
(Indonesia) 2018	Did not qualify								3	1	0	2	1	4
(Uzbekistan) 2020	Cancelled								3	0	0	3	0	20
(Uzbekistan) 2023	Did not enter								Did not enter					
Total	–	0/41	–	–	–	–	–	–	54	3	1	50	19	319

== See also ==
- Sports in Macau
