= Oman national under-20 football team =

Oman U-20
- Nickname: The Red Warriors
- Association: Oman Football Association
- Confederation: AFC (Asia)
- Sub-confederation: WAFF (West Asia)
- Head coach: (Oman) Rasheed Jaber
- Captain: Hasan Al-Saadi
- Home stadium: Sultan Qaboos Sports Complex
- FIFA code: OMA
First colours	Second colours

AFC U-20 Asian Cup
- Appearances: 3 (first in 2000)
- Best result: Group Stage (2000, 2014, 2023)

The Oman national under-20 football team is controlled by Oman Football Association and represents Oman in international under-20 football competitions.

== History ==
On 2 February 2014, Oman Football Association appointed former Oman national football team manager Rasheed Jaber Al-Yafai as the head manager of the Oman national under-20 football team. His immediate task was to prepare the team for the 2014 AFC U-19 Championship to be held from October 9–23 in Myanmar.

== Current squad ==
Oman announced their final squad of 23 players on 22 February 2023.

Head coach: (Spain) David Gordo

No.	Pos.	Player	Date of birth (age)	Club
1	GK	Mazin Saleh Zayid	29 January 2003 (aged 20)	(Oman Football Association) Muscat
2	DF	Ayman Karim Al-Nabhani	27 July 2003 (aged 19)	(Oman Football Association) Al-Hamra
3	DF	Said Ghasib Al-Ghanboosi	4 February 2005 (aged 18)	(Oman Football Association) Al-Orouba
4	DF	Turki Abdullah Bait Rabia	1 April 2004 (aged 18)	(Oman Football Association) Al-Ittihad
5	DF	Salim Sulaiman Al-Abdali (captain)	14 February 2004 (aged 19)	(Oman Football Association) Al-Seeb
6	MF	Ali Hassan Al-Bulushi	2 May 2004 (aged 18)	(Oman Football Association) Oman
7	MF	Al-Moatasim Amar Jid		(Oman Football Association) Dhofar
8	MF	Mohammed Hamed Al-Aufi	13 October 2003 (aged 19)	(Oman Football Association) Al-Hamra
9	FW	Khalid Ibrahim Al-Sulaimi	12 September 2003 (aged 19)	(Royal Spanish Football Federation) Celta de Vigo
10	MF	Abdul Mageed Al-Balushi	15 January 2004 (aged 19)	(Oman Football Association) Oman
11	FW	Mamoon Said Al-Araimi	22 July 2004 (aged 18)	(Oman Football Association) Al-Orouba
12	GK	Al Muhtadi Al-Abri	19 September 2003 (aged 19)	(Oman Football Association) Bahla
13	DF	Usama Mohamed Al-Mahruqi	7 March 2003 (aged 19)	(Oman Football Association) Al-Seeb
14	DF	Jabran Khalil Al-Amri	23 August 2004 (aged 18)	(Oman Football Association) Bawshar
15	MF	Sultan Badar Al-Marzuq	23 October 2004 (aged 18)	(Oman Football Association) Dhofar
16	DF	Abdullah Mohammed Al-Afifi	5 January 2005 (aged 18)	(Oman Football Association) Al-Hamra
17	FW	Abdallah Juma Al-Rajhi	1 April 2003 (aged 19)	(Oman Football Association) Bawshar
18	MF	Mohammed Bait Subeea	9 November 2004 (aged 18)	(Oman Football Association) Al-Nasr
19	FW	Salah Waleed Al-Jadeedi	26 February 2003 (aged 20)	(Oman Football Association) Al-Hamra
20	MF	Nasser Ali Al-Saqri	9 February 2004 (aged 19)	(Royal Spanish Football Federation) Celta de Vigo
21	MF	Ahad Al-Mashaikhi	30 May 2003 (aged 19)	(Oman Football Association) Muscat
22	GK	Usama Faraj Al-Rawahi	9 March 2003 (aged 19)	(Oman Football Association) Al-Seeb
23	DF	Musab Said Al-Shamsi	19 September 2003 (aged 19)	(Oman Football Association) Fanja

== Tournament Records ==
=== FIFA U-20 World Cup ===
Year	Result	Pld	W	D	L	GF	GA
(Tunisia) 1977	Did not play						
(Japan) 1979	Did not qualify						
(Australia) 1981	Did not qualify						
(Mexico) 1983	Did not qualify						
(Soviet Union) 1985	Did not qualify						
(Chile) 1987	Did not qualify						
(Saudi Arabia) 1989	Did not qualify						
(Portugal) 1991	Did not qualify						
(Australia) 1993	Did not qualify						
(Qatar) 1995	Did not qualify						
(Malaysia) 1997	Did not qualify						
(Nigeria) 1999	Did not qualify						
(Argentina) 2001	Did not qualify						
(United Arab Emirates) 2003	Did not qualify						
(Netherlands) 2005	Did not qualify						
(Canada) 2007	Did not qualify						
(Egypt) 2009	Did not qualify						
(Colombia) 2011	Did not qualify						
(Turkey) 2013	Did not qualify						
(New Zealand) 2015	Did not qualify						
(South Korea) 2017	Did not qualify						
(Poland) 2019	Did not qualify						
(Indonesia) ~~2021~~	Cancelled						
(Argentina) 2023	Did not qualify						
(Chile) 2025	Did not qualify						
(Azerbaijan) (Uzbekistan) 2027	To be determined						
Total	0	0	0	0	0	0	0

=== AFC U-20 Asian Cup ===
Host nation(s) and year	Round	Pos	Pld	W	D	L	GF	GA
(Malaysia) 1959	Did not qualify							
(Malaysia) 1960	Did not qualify							
(Thailand) 1961	Did not qualify							
(Thailand) 1962	Did not qualify							
(Malaysia) 1963	Did not qualify							
(South Vietnam) 1964	Did not qualify							
(Japan) 1965	Did not qualify							
(Philippines) 1966	Did not qualify							
(Thailand) 1967	Did not qualify							
(South Korea) 1968	Did not qualify							
(Thailand) 1969	Did not qualify							
(Philippines) 1970	Did not qualify							
(Japan) 1971	Did not qualify							
(Thailand) 1972	Did not qualify							
(Iran) 1973	Did not qualify							
(Thailand) 1974	Did not qualify							
(Kuwait) 1975	Did not qualify							
(Thailand) 1976	Did not qualify							
(Iran) 1977	Did not qualify							
(Bangladesh) 1978	Did not qualify							
(Thailand) 1980	Did not qualify							
(Thailand) 1982	Did not qualify							
(United Arab Emirates) 1985	Did not qualify							
(Saudi Arabia) 1986	Did not qualify							
(Qatar) 1988	Did not qualify							
(Indonesia) 1990	Did not qualify							
(United Arab Emirates) 1992	Did not qualify							
(Indonesia) 1994	Did not qualify							
(South Korea) 1996	Did not qualify							
(Thailand) 1998	Did not qualify							
(Iran) 2000	Group Stage	8th	4	0	2	2	2	6
(Qatar) 2002	Did not qualify							
(Malaysia) 2004	Did not qualify							
(India) 2006	Did not qualify							
(Saudi Arabia) 2008	Did not qualify							
(China) 2010	Did not qualify							
(United Arab Emirates) 2012	Did not qualify							
(Myanmar) 2014	Group Stage	15th	3	0	1	2	1	9
(Bahrain) 2016	Did not qualify							
(Indonesia) 2018	Did not qualify							
(Uzbekistan) ~~2020~~	Cancelled							
(Uzbekistan) 2023	Group Stage	15th	3	0	1	2	0	5
(China) 2025	Did not qualify							
Total	3/42		10	0	4	6	3	20

== Kits and sponsors ==
On February 3, 2014, Oman Football Association is currently confirmed tie-up with Italian sports apparel manufacturer Kappa. A joint venture agreement was signed by sportswear giant Kappa and the OFA's apparel brand Taj Oman. In a 4-year deal, Kappa will produce the kit worn by all the Oman National football teams bearing the Taj mark, and will provide Oman with a large range of sportswear specific for the country. The deal will see both the names (Kappa & Taj) on the kit worn by the National teams and on all retail items. Oman Air also renewed its deal on the same day with the OFA till the end of the 2013-14 season.

== Head-to-head record ==
The following table shows Oman's head-to-head record in the AFC U-20 Asian Cup.

Opponent	Pld	W	D	L	GF	GA	GD	Win %
Iran	1	0	0	1	0	3	−3	0.00
Iraq	1	0	0	1	0	6	−6	0.00
Japan	1	0	1	0	2	2	+0	0.00
Jordan	1	0	1	0	0	0	+0	0.00
Kuwait	1	0	0	1	0	1	−1	0.00
North Korea	1	0	1	0	1	1	+0	0.00
Qatar	1	0	0	1	0	2	−2	0.00
South Korea	1	0	0	1	0	4	−4	0.00
Tajikistan	1	0	0	1	0	1	−1	0.00
Thailand	1	0	1	0	0	0	+0	0.00
Total	10	0	4	6	3	20	−17	0.00

== See also ==
- Oman national football team
- Oman women's national football team
