= Iran national under-20 football team =

National association football team

Iran under-20
- Nickname(s): Team Melli Javanan ("The Youth National Team")
- Association: FFIRI
- Confederation: AFC (Asia)
- Head coach: Ghasem Haddadifar
- Captain: Erfan Darvishaali
- FIFA code: IRN
First colours	Second colours

FIFA U-20 World Cup
- Appearances: 3 (first in 1977)
- Best result: Group Stage (1977, 2001, 2017)

AFC U-20 Asian Cup
- Appearances: 22 (first in 1969)
- Best result: Champions: 1973, 1974, 1975, 1976

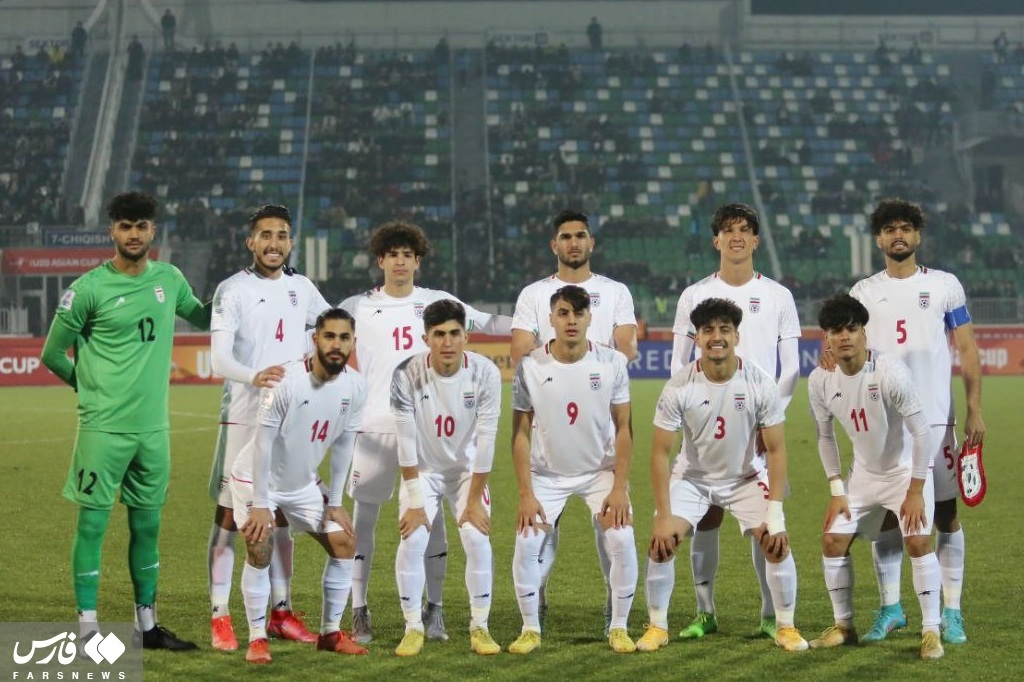
Iran v Qatar, 1 March 2023

Iran national under-20 football team (also known as Iran Under-20, Iran U-20 or Iran Youth Team) represents Iran in international Association football competitions in AFC U-20 Asian Cup and FIFA U-20 World Cup, as well as any other under-20 international football tournaments. It is controlled by the Iran Football Federation.

== Tournament records ==
=== FIFA U-20 World Cup ===
FIFA U-20 World Cup record
Year	Round	M	W	D	L	GF	GA	GD
(Tunisia) 1977	Group Stage	3	1	1	1	4	5	-1
(Japan) 1979	did not qualify							
(Australia) 1981	did not qualify							
(Mexico) 1983	did not qualify							
(Soviet Union) 1985	did not qualify							
(Chile) 1987	did not qualify							
(Saudi Arabia) 1989	did not qualify							
(Portugal) 1991	did not qualify							
(Australia) 1993	did not qualify							
(Qatar) 1995	did not qualify							
(Malaysia) 1997	did not qualify							
(Nigeria) 1999	did not qualify							
(Argentina) 2001	Group Stage	3	0	0	3	0	8	-8
(United Arab Emirates) 2003	did not qualify							
(Netherlands) 2005	did not qualify							
(Canada) 2007	did not qualify							
(Egypt) 2009	did not qualify							
(Colombia) 2011	did not qualify							
(Turkey) 2013	did not qualify							
(New Zealand) 2015	did not qualify							
(South Korea) 2017	Group Stage	3	1	0	2	4	6	-2
(Poland) 2019	did not qualify							
(Indonesia) ~~2021~~	Cancelled							
(Argentina) 2023	did not qualify							
(Chile) 2025	did not qualify							
(Azerbaijan) (Uzbekistan) 2027	To be determined							
Total	3/24	9	2	1	6	8	19	-11

=== AFC U-19 Championship ===
AFC U-19 Championship record									Qualifications							
Year	Round	M	W	D	L	GF	GA	GD	M	W	D	L	GF	GA	GD	Link
(Malaysia) 1959	did not enter								No qualification							
(Malaysia) 1960	did not enter								No qualification							
(Thailand) 1961	did not enter								No qualification							
(Thailand) 1962	did not enter								No qualification							
(Malaysia) 1963	did not enter								No qualification							
(Vietnam) 1964	did not enter								No qualification							
(Japan) 1965	did not enter								No qualification							
(Philippines) 1966	did not enter								No qualification							
(Thailand) 1967	did not enter								No qualification							
(South Korea) 1968	did not enter								No qualification							
(Thailand) 1969	Third place	6	4	1	1	13	4	+9	No qualification							
(Philippines) 1970	Quarterfinals	4	3	0	1	15	2	+13	No qualification							
(Japan) 1971	Quarterfinals	4	2	2	0	7	1	+8	No qualification							
(Thailand) 1972	Third place	6	4	0	2	11	2	+9	No qualification							
(Iran) 1973	Champions	4	4	0	0	10	1	+9	No qualification							
(Thailand) 1974	Champions	6	5	1	0	18	2	+16	No qualification							
(Kuwait) 1975	Champions	6	4	2	0	16	1	+15	No qualification							
(Thailand) 1976	Champions	6	5	1	0	11	2	+9	No qualification							
(Iran) 1977	Runners-up	5	4	0	1	19	5	+14	No qualification							
(Bangladesh) 1978	Quarterfinals	4	2	1	1	6	3	+3	No qualification							
(Thailand) 1980	did not enter								did not enter							Link
(Thailand) 1982	Qualified but withdraw								-	-	-	-	-	-	-	Link
(United Arab Emirates) 1985	did not enter								did not enter							Link
(Saudi Arabia) 1986	did not enter								did not enter							Link
(Qatar) 1988	did not qualify								4	1	2	1	2	4	-2	Link
(Indonesia) 1990	did not qualify								2	0	1	1	1	2	-1	Link
(United Arab Emirates) 1992	Round 1	3	1	1	1	2	2	0	-	-	-	-	-	-	-	Link
(Indonesia) 1994	did not qualify								-	-	-	-	-	-	-	Link
(South Korea) 1996	Round 1	4	0	3	1	1	2	-1	3	2	1	0	9	1	+8	Link
(Thailand) 1998	did not qualify								-	-	-	-	-	-	-	Link
(Iran) 2000	Fourth place	6	4	2	0	13	5	+8	Qualified as hosts							Link
(Qatar) 2002	did not qualify								3	1	0	2	6	8	-2	Link
(Malaysia) 2004	Round 1	3	1	1	1	7	4	+3	2	2	0	0	8	1	+7	Link
(India) 2006	Round 1	3	2	0	1	5	7	-2	2	2	0	0	7	0	+7	Link
(Saudi Arabia) 2008	Round 1	3	1	0	2	5	6	-1	5	4	1	0	20	0	+20	Link
(China) 2010	Round 1	3	1	0	2	2	5	-3	2	1	1	0	5	1	+4	Link
(United Arab Emirates) 2012	Quarterfinals	4	2	1	1	10	5	+5	3	3	0	0	12	0	+12	Link
(Myanmar) 2014	Round 1	3	1	0	2	3	3	0	3	3	0	0	9	1	+8	Link
(Bahrain) 2016	Semifinals	5	2	2	1	9	7	+2	3	3	0	0	15	0	+15	Link
(Indonesia) 2018	did not qualify								3	1	2	0	5	1	+4	Link
(Uzbekistan) ~~2020~~	Qualified but cancelled								3	3	0	0	9	0	+9	Link
(Uzbekistan) 2023	Quarterfinals	4	2	0	2	6	5	+1	3	3	0	0	11	0	+11	Link
(China) 2025	Quarterfinals	4	3	1	0	12	2	+10	3	3	0	0	17	0	+17	Link
(China) 2027	To Be Determined															
Total	22/42	96	57	19	20	201	76	+125	44	32	8	4	136	19	+117	_

=== CAFA U-19 Championship ===
CAFA Junior Championship record
Year	Round	Pld	W	D	L	GS	GA
(Uzbekistan) 2016	Withdrew	-	-	-	-	-	-
(Tajikistan) 2019	Champions	4	3	1	0	9	1
(Tajikistan) 2022	Champions	4	2	2	0	12	4
Total	2/3	8	5	3	0	21	5

=== Toulon Tournament ===
- 2012 AFF U-19 Youth ChampionshipChampions
- 1978 Toulon Tournament 7th place (out of 8)

=== Panda Cup ===
- 2017 Panda Cup 3rd place (out of 4)

== Results and fixtures ==
Win Draw Loss

== Coaching staff ==
Position	Name
Head coach	(Iran) Hossein Abdi
Team manager	Faraz Fatemi

== Players ==
=== Current squad ===
The final list for the 2027 AFC U-20 Asian Cup qualification was announced on August 10, 2026.

No.	Pos.	Player	Date of birth (age)	Club
	GK	Amir Mahdi Maghsoudi		(Football Federation Islamic Republic of Iran) Sepahan
	DF	Mohammad Amin Hosseini		(Football Federation Islamic Republic of Iran) Foolad
	DF	Mohammad Akbari		(Football Federation Islamic Republic of Iran) Sepahan
	DF	Amir Mohammad Karimi		(Football Federation Islamic Republic of Iran) Aluminium Arak
	DF	Ali Mastani		(Football Federation Islamic Republic of Iran) Zob Ahan
	MF	Arian Moali		(Football Federation Islamic Republic of Iran) Kheybar
	FW	Mahan Alipour		(Football Federation Islamic Republic of Iran) Bargh Shiraz
	MF	Mohammad Mahdi Jannia		(Football Federation Islamic Republic of Iran) Tractor
	FW	Erfan Khodadadian		(Football Federation Islamic Republic of Iran) Aluminium Arak
	MF	Mahan Beheshti		(Football Federation Islamic Republic of Iran) Malavan
	FW	Abolfazl Zadeh Attar		(Football Federation Islamic Republic of Iran) Foolad
	GK	Abolfazl Khalilian		(Football Federation Islamic Republic of Iran) Sepahan
	DF	Mohammad Ali Sahneh		(Football Federation Islamic Republic of Iran) Shahin Tehran
	MF	Mahdi Cheshm berah		(Football Federation Islamic Republic of Iran) Persepolis
	MF	Morteza Farkhani		(Football Federation Islamic Republic of Iran) Zob Ahan
	MF	Amir Mahdi Yahyaei		(Football Federation Islamic Republic of Iran) Aluminium Arak
	DF	Abolfazl Kazemi		(Football Federation Islamic Republic of Iran) Nassaji
	DF	Pouya Esmi		(Football Federation Islamic Republic of Iran) Persepolis
	FW	Benyamin Alipour		(Football Federation Islamic Republic of Iran) Gol Gohar
	FW	Amir Hossein Farsi		(Football Federation Islamic Republic of Iran) Kheybar
	FW	Jafar Asadi		(Football Federation Islamic Republic of Iran) Paykan
	GK	Mohammad Ali Moshabeh		(Football Federation Islamic Republic of Iran) Paykan
	FW	Mohammad Reza Abbasi		(Football Federation Islamic Republic of Iran) Gol Gohar

=== Previous squads ===
==== FIFA U-20 World Cups ====
- FIFA World Youth Championship 1977 squad
- FIFA World Youth Championship 2001 squad
- FIFA U-20 World Cup 2017 squad

== Head-to-head record ==
The following table shows Iran's head-to-head record in the FIFA U-20 World Cup.

Opponent	Pld	W	D	L	GF	GA	GD	Win %
Brazil	1	0	0	1	1	5	−4	0.00
Costa Rica	1	1	0	0	1	0	+1	100.00
France	1	0	0	1	0	5	−5	0.00
Ghana	1	0	0	1	0	1	−1	0.00
Italy	1	0	1	0	0	0	+0	0.00
Ivory Coast	1	1	0	0	3	0	+3	100.00
Paraguay	1	0	0	1	0	2	−2	0.00
Portugal	1	0	0	1	1	2	−1	0.00
Zambia	1	0	0	1	2	4	−2	0.00
Total	9	2	1	6	8	19	−11	22.22

== See also ==
- Iran national football team
- Iran national under-23 football team
- Iran national under-17 football team
