= Sri Lanka national under-20 football team =

National association football team

Sri Lanka
- Association: Football Federation of Sri Lanka
- Confederation: AFC(Asia)
- Head coach: Imran Mohamed
- FIFA code: SRI
First colours	Second colours

First international
- Ceylon 0-12 Malaysia (Kuala Lumpur, Malaysia; 18 April 1959)

AFC U-19 Championship
- Appearances: 8 (first in 1959)
- Best result: Quarter Finals (1967)

The Sri Lanka national under-20 football team represents Sri Lanka in International Youth Football tournaments. Sri Lanka U-20 football team has a long history dating back to the 1960s. The Sri Lanka U-20 football team has yet to qualify for the FIFA U-20 World Cup. The team has qualified for the Quarter Finals of the 1967 AFC Youth Championship.

== History ==
Sri Lanka U-20 football team has a long history back to late 1960s. Sri Lanka U-20 Team was a competitor in the first AFC Youth Championship. Sri Lanka qualified for the Quarter Finals in 1967 AFC Youth Championship.

== Tournament Records ==
=== FIFA U-20 World Cup ===
World Cup finals									World Cup qualifications					
Hosts/Year	Result	Position	GP	W	D	L	GS	GA	GP	W	D*	L	GS	GA
(Tunisia) 1977 to (Canada) 2007	Did not Qualify								6	1	0	5	2	24
(Egypt) 2009 to (New Zealand) 2015	Did not Enter								Did not Enter					
(South Korea) 2017 to (Chile) 2025	Did not Qualify								10	2	1	9	3	40
(Azerbaijan) (Uzbekistan) 2027	To be determined								To be determined					
Total	0/25	-	-	-	-	-	-	-	9	2	0	7	4	29

=== AFC U-19 Championship ===
Championship finals									Championship qualifications					
Hosts/Year	Result	Position	GP	W	D	L	GS	GA	GP	W	D*	L	GS	GA
(Malaysia) 1959			5	1	0	4	10	33						
(Malaysia) 1960	Did not Enter								Did not Enter					
(Thailand) 1961	Group Stage	7/10	4	1	0	3	9	13	No Qualify Round					
(Thailand) 1962	Did not Enter								Did not Enter					
(Malaysia) 1963	Group Stage	11/12	5	0	0	5	3	18	No Qualify Round					
1964 to 1965	Did not Enter								No Qualify Round					
(Philippines) 1966	Group Stage	9/12	3	1	0	2	4	9	No Qualify Round					
(Thailand) 1967	Quarter Finals	8/14	3	1	0	2	3	12	No Qualify Round					
(South Korea) 1968	Did not Enter								No Qualify Round					
(Thailand) 1969	Group Stage	12/15	3	0	2	1	2	5	No Qualify Round					
(Philippines) 1970			3	0	0	3	1	12	No Qualify Round					
1962 to 1975	Did not Enter								No Qualify Round					
(Thailand) 1976	Group Stage	16/16	3	0	0	3	2	13	No Qualify Round					
(Iran) 1977	Did not Enter								No Qualify Round					
(Bangladesh) 1978	Group Stage	18/18	4	0	0	4	1	19	No Qualify Round					
1980 to 1985	Did not Qualify								No Qualify Round					
(Saudi Arabia) 1986	Group Stage	8/8	3	0	0	3	0	18	No Qualify Round					
1988 to 2004	Did not Qualify													
(India) 2006	Did not Qualify								2	1	0	1	2	5
(Saudi Arabia) 2008	Did not Enter								Did not Enter					
(China) 2010	Did not Qualify								4	0	0	4	0	19
2012 to 2014	Did not Enter								Did not Enter					
2016 to 2025	Did not Qualify								2	0	0	2	0	5
Total	10 year	Quarter Final	36	4	2	30	35	152	13	2	0	11	14	60

=== SAFF U-20 Championship ===
SAFF U-20 Championship records
Hosts / Year	Result	Position	GP	W	D*	L	GS	GA
(Nepal) 2015	Did not participate							
(Bhutan) 2017	Did not participate							
(Nepal) 2019	Group-stage	6/6	2	0	0	2	0	6
(India) 2022	Round-robin	5/5	4	0	1	3	1	9
(Nepal) 2023	Did not participate							
(Nepal) 2024	Group-stage	6/6	2	0	0	2	0	3
(India) 2025	Group-stage	6/6	2	0	0	2	0	13
(Maldives) 2026	Group-stage	5/7	3	1	0	2	3	4
Total	5/8	0 Titles	13	1	1	9	4	35

== Fixtures and results ==
=== 2026 ===
23 March 2026 SAFF U-20 2026	Maldives	2–3	Sri Lanka	Malé, Maldives
20:30 MVT	Imran 28', 45+12'		Mohamed 46'; Hijaazy 63'; Hussain 88' (pen.)	Stadium: National Football Stadium; Attendance: 1,664; Referee: Jatinder Singh (India)

25 March 2026 SAFF U-20 2026	Sri Lanka	0–1	Nepal	Malé, Maldives
15:45 MVT			S. Bam 24'	Stadium: National Football Stadium; Attendance: 451; Referee: Raeef Rauf (Maldives)

27 March 2026 SAFF U-20 2026	Bhutan	1–0	Sri Lanka	Malé, Maldives
20:30 MVT	Dhendup 90+2'			Stadium: National Football Stadium, Malé; Attendance: 714; Referee: Jatinder Singh (India)

31 August 2027 AFC U-20 Asian Cup qualification	Myanmar	4–0	Sri Lanka	Yangon, Myanmar
	Sai Bo Bo Kyaw 18'; Kaung Khant Kyaw 27', 39'; Sai Zom Shang 86'	Report		Stadium: Thuwunna Stadium; Referee: Venkatesh Ramachandran (India)

3 September 2026 2027 AFC U-20 Asian Cup qualification	Sri Lanka	0–4	Maldives	Yangon, Myanmar
		Report	Imran 45+3'; Shamhaan 60'; Nasir 78', 80'	Stadium: Thuwunna Stadium; Referee: Hussein Abo Yehia (Lebanon)

6 September 2026 2027 AFC U-20 Asian Cup qualification	Brunei	0–2	Sri Lanka	Yangon, Myanmar
		Report	Katheem 46'; Maleek 67'	Stadium: Thuwunna Stadium; Referee: Khash-Erdene Bold (Mongolia)

== Coaching staff ==
Position	Name
Head coach	(Maldives) Imran Mohamed
Assistant coach	(Sri Lanka) Mohamad Fawmy
Goalkeeping coach	(Sri Lanka) Priyantha Edirisinghe
Performance analyst	(Sri Lanka) Sanka Jayamina
Team doctor	(Sri Lanka) Chathura Akalanka Edirisinghe
Physiotherapist	(Sri Lanka) Saman Dayawansa
Masseur	(Sri Lanka) Ruwan Jayasuriya
Kitman	(Sri Lanka) Shabeer Perera
Media officer	(Sri Lanka) Isuru Maduwantha
Team staff	(Sri Lanka) Hiran Rathnayaka

== Honours ==
- Lusofonia Games:
  - Bronze Medal : 2014

== See also ==
- Sri Lanka national football team
- Sri Lanka women's national football team
- Sri Lanka national under-23 football team
- Sri Lanka national under-17 football team
