= 1994 AFC Youth Championship qualification =

The Qualifiers for the 1994 AFC Youth Championship were the qualifying stage for the youth tournament that determined the Asian representatives for the 1995 FIFA World Youth Championship to be held in Qatar.

== Group 1 ==
Kazakhstan won the group against Tajikistan, Turkmenistan and Uzbekistan, but the results are unknown.

== Group 2 ==
Qatar qualified by eliminating Lebanon, Jordan and Palestine, but the results are unknown.

== Group 3 ==
Syria and Bahrain eliminated Iran and Oman, but the results are unknown.

== Group 4 ==
Kuwait eliminated the United Arab Emirates and Pakistan in Dubai, with the curious fact that Pakistan sent two teams due to a disagreement between the president and the secretary general of the Pakistan Football Federation. As a result of the incident, Pakistan was suspended by the AFC and FIFA for five weeks.

== Group 5 ==
Originally, three teams were scheduled to participate, but Yemen withdrew from the tournament and an elimination match was played in Colombo, Sri Lanka.

Team 1	Score	Team 2
Sri Lanka	1–4	Iraq

== Group 6 ==
The matches were played in Kuala Lumpur, Malaysia from 30 May to 3 June.

Country	Pld	W	D	L	GF	GA	Pts
South Korea	3	3	0	0	12	0	9
Malaysia	3	1	1	1	11	3	4
Singapore	3	1	1	1	4	4	4
Brunei	3	0	0	3	2	22	0

30 May 1994

Singapore	3–1	Brunei

30 May 1994

Malaysia	0–1	South Korea

1 June 1994

South Korea	9–0	Brunei

1 June 1994

Malaysia	1–1	Singapore

3 June 1994

Singapore	0–2	South Korea

3 June 1994

Brunei	1–10	Malaysia

== Group 7 ==
The matches were played in Bangkok, Thailand from 1 to 5 May.

Country	Pld	W	D	L	GF	GA	Pts
Thailand	2	2	0	0	10	0	6
China	2	1	0	1	2	2	3
Myanmar	2	0	0	2	0	10	0

1 May 1994

Thailand	2–0	China

3 May 1994

China	2–0	Myanmar

5 May 1994

Myanmar	0–8	Thailand

== Group 8 ==
The matches were played in IAI Stadium Nihondaira, Shizuoka, Japan from 11 to 15 May.

Country	Pld	W	D	L	GF	GA	Pts
Japan	2	2	0	0	26	0	6
Chinese Taipei	2	1	0	1	7	12	3
Guam	2	0	0	2	0	21	0

11 May 1994

Guam	0–14	Japan

IAI Stadium Nihondaira, Shizuoka
13 May 1994

Chinese Taipei	7–0	Guam

IAI Stadium Nihondaira, Shizuoka
15 May 1994

Japan	12–0	Chinese Taipei

IAI Stadium Nihondaira, Shizuoka

== Qualified teams ==
Total 10 teams qualified for 1994 AFC Youth Championship.

- Indonesia (host)
- Kazakhstan
- Qatar
- Syria
- Kuwait
- Iraq
- South Korea
- Thailand
- Japan
- Bahrain
