= South Vietnam national under-20 football team =

National U-20 association football team

South Vietnam U-20
- Nickname(s): Rồng vàng (Golden Dragon)
- Association: Vietnam Football Association
- Confederation: AFC (Asia)
- Head coach: -
- FIFA code: VSO

First international
- Indonesia 2–0 South Vietnam (Bangkok, Thailand; 11 April 1961)

Last international
- Singapore 4–0 South Vietnam (Bangkok, Thailand; 22 April 1974)

Biggest win
- South Vietnam 7–0 Philippines (Tokyo, Japan; 28 April 1965)

Biggest defeat
- Burma 7–1 South Vietnam (Bangkok, Thailand; 23 April 1969); Burma 6–0 South Vietnam (Manila, Philippines; 19 April 1970)

AFC Youth Championship
- Appearances: 11 (first in 1961)
- Best result: Fourth place, 1961

The South Vietnam national under-20 football team (Vietnamese: Đội tuyển bóng đá quốc gia U-20 Việt Nam Cộng hòa) was the under-20 team that represented the Republic of Vietnam designated specifically for the AFC Youth Championship (today AFC U-20 Asian Cup). It ceased to exist on the Fall of Saigon.

The South Vietnam team played their last games at 1974 AFC Youth Championship, and ceased to exist 1 year later after the Fall of Saigon in April. The North and South regions combined into the unified Vietnam in 1975, with the Vietnam national team replacing both the North and South teams. Like their senior teams, the unified republic was allowed to keep South Vietnam's membership of FIFA and the AFC, resulting in the South Vietnam team's historical record usually being counted as part of the overall record of the Vietnam national under-20 team.

== History ==
South Vietnam under-20 had appeared at 11 AFC Youth Championships throughout their existence. Their first appearance came at the 1961 tournament held in Thailand, where they were defeated by Indonesia 2–0 on their first match, but managed to won two matches against Singapore 5–0 and unexpectedly, Japan 4–2. South Vietnam later managed to hold a 1–1 draw against South Korea, advancing them to third place match. They lost Thailand 2–1, finishing fourth as their best result.

3 years later, South Vietnam hosted their tournament in Saigon, and was drawn in Group B, against Burma, Malaysia and India. They started their matches by losing 3–0 to Malaysia, then managed to hold a 0–0 draw against India and finally winning 1–0 against Burma. Finishing 3rd on the group table and was eliminated on the group stage as the result of goal difference.

The team played their last games on the 1974 AFC Youth Championship, where they won 1–0 against the Filipinos on 16 April 1974, their last winning match. They later played their final matches against Iran and Singapore, losing 2 matches with a score of 4–0 on 20 and 22 April 1974, finishing 3rd on the group table. The team ceased to exist 1 year later after the Fall of Saigon in April, when the Vietnam War ended.

== Tournament record ==
=== AFC Youth Championship ===
AFC Youth Championship record
Year	Result	Pld	W	D	L	GF	GA
(Federation of Malaya) 1959	Did not enter						
(Federation of Malaya) 1960	Did not enter						
(Thailand) 1961	Fourth place	5	2	1	2	11	7
(Thailand) 1962	Group stage	4	1	2	1	6	5
(Federation of Malaya) 1963	Group stage	5	2	2	1	10	7
(South Vietnam) 1964	Group stage	3	1	1	1	6	6
(Japan) 1965	Group stage	4	1	0	3	9	8
(Philippines) 1966	Did not enter						
(Thailand) 1967	Quarter-finals	4	1	2	1	3	5
(South Korea) 1968	Group stage	3	1	0	2	2	7
(Thailand) 1969	Quarter-finals	4	1	1	2	6	13
(Philippines) 1970	Group stage	3	1	0	2	1	7
(Japan) 1971	Group stage	3	1	0	2	2	8
(Thailand) 1972	Withdrew						
(Iran) 1973	Did not enter						
(Thailand) 1974	Group stage	3	1	0	2	1	8
(Kuwait) 1975	Did not enter						
Total	Fourth place	38	12	8	17	56	73

== Match results ==
Keynotes
Win
Draw
Defeat

=== 1961 ===
11 April 1961 AFC Youth Championship GS	Indonesia	2–0	South Vietnam	Bangkok, Thailand
	Kuswanadji 15'; Andjiek Alinurdin 25'

12 April 1961 AFC Youth Championship GS	South Vietnam	5–0	Singapore	Bangkok, Thailand

April 1961 AFC Youth Championship GS	South Vietnam	4–2	Japan	Bangkok, Thailand

18 April 1961 AFC Youth Championship GS	South Korea	1–1	South Vietnam	Bangkok, Thailand

April 1961 AFC Youth Championship third place play-off	Thailand	2–1	South Vietnam	Bangkok, Thailand

=== 1962 ===
15 April 1962 AFC Youth Championship GS	Malaya	2–2	South Vietnam	Bangkok, Thailand

18 April 1962 AFC Youth Championship GS	Burma	1–0	South Vietnam	Bangkok, Thailand

21 April 1962 AFC Youth Championship GS	South Vietnam	1–1	Thailand	Bangkok, Thailand

23 April 1962 AFC Youth Championship GS	Japan	1–3	South Vietnam	Bangkok, Thailand

=== 1963 ===
19 April 1963 AFC Youth Championship GS	South Vietnam	0–2	Hong Kong	Penang, Malaya

21 April 1963 AFC Youth Championship GS	Singapore	2–3	South Vietnam	Penang, Malaya

24 April 1963 AFC Youth Championship GS	South Vietnam	4–0	Ceylon	Penang, Malaya

25 April 1963 AFC Youth Championship GS	South Korea	1–1	South Vietnam	Penang, Malaya

27 April 1963 AFC Youth Championship GS	Japan	2–2	South Vietnam	Penang, Malaya

=== 1964 ===
18 April 1964 AFC Youth Championship GS	South Vietnam	0–3	Malaysia	Saigon, South Vietnam
				Stadium: Cộng Hòa Stadium

22 April 1964 AFC Youth Championship GS	South Vietnam	0–0	India	Saigon, South Vietnam
				Stadium: Cộng Hòa Stadium

25 April 1964 AFC Youth Championship GS	South Vietnam	1–0	Burma	Saigon, South Vietnam
				Stadium: Cộng Hòa Stadium

=== 1965 ===
25 April 1965 AFC Youth Championship GS	Israel	5–1	South Vietnam	Tokyo, Japan

28 April 1965 AFC Youth Championship GS	South Vietnam	7–0	Philippines	Tokyo, Japan

29 April 1965 AFC Youth Championship GS	Hong Kong	1–0	South Vietnam	Tokyo, Japan

1 May 1965 AFC Youth Championship GS	Japan	2–1	South Vietnam	Tokyo, Japan

=== 1967 ===
15 April 1967 AFC Youth Championship GS	South Korea	1–1	South Vietnam	Bangkok, Thailand

18 April 1967 AFC Youth Championship GS	South Vietnam	1–0	Hong Kong	Bangkok, Thailand

21 April 1967 AFC Youth Championship GS	Indonesia	1–1	South Vietnam	Bangkok, Thailand

23 April 1964 AFC Youth Championship QF	Israel	3–0	South Vietnam	Bangkok, Thailand

=== 1968 ===
3 May 1968 AFC Youth Championship GS	Burma	4–0	South Vietnam	Seoul, South Korea

5 May 1968 AFC Youth Championship GS	South Vietnam	1–0	Philippines	Seoul, South Korea

8 May 1968 AFC Youth Championship GS	Singapore	3–1	South Vietnam	Seoul, South Korea

=== 1969 ===
16 April 1969 AFC Youth Championship GS	Hong Kong	2–3	South Vietnam	Bangkok, Thailand

20 April 1969 AFC Youth Championship GS	Taiwan	1–1	South Vietnam	Bangkok, Thailand

23 April 1969 AFC Youth Championship GS	Burma	7–1	South Vietnam	Bangkok, Thailand

25 April 1969 AFC Youth Championship QF	Thailand	3–1	South Vietnam	Bangkok, Thailand

=== 1970 ===
18 April 1970 AFC Youth Championship GS	South Vietnam	1–0	Taiwan	Manila, Philippines
	Tran Van Nam 21'

19 April 1970 AFC Youth Championship GS	Burma	6–0	South Vietnam	Manila, Philippines

26 April 1970 AFC Youth Championship GS	Indonesia	1–0	South Vietnam	Manila, Philippines
	Budi Santoso 7'

=== 1971 ===
25 April 1971 AFC Youth Championship GS	South Korea	3–1	South Vietnam	Tokyo, Japan

27 April 1971 AFC Youth Championship GS	Israel	5–0	South Vietnam	Tokyo, Japan

29 April 1971 AFC Youth Championship GS	South Vietnam	1–0	Hong Kong	Tokyo, Japan

=== 1974 ===
16 April 1974 AFC Youth Championship GS	South Vietnam	1–0	Philippines	Bangkok, Thailand

20 April 1974 AFC Youth Championship GS	Iran	4–0	South Vietnam	Bangkok, Thailand
	Hassan Rowshan; Parviz Mazloumi; Hadi Naraghi

29 April 1974 AFC Youth Championship GS	Singapore	4–0	South Vietnam	Bangkok, Thailand
			Sharon Rahmat; Ramli Haron; Mohammed Noh; Jacob Chacko

== Honours ==
=== Continental ===
- AFC Youth Championship
  - Fourth place (1): 1961

== See also ==
- South Vietnam national football team
- Vietnam national under-20 football team
