= Dali Omar =

Malaysian footballer

Personal information
- Full name: Dali bin Omar
- Date of birth: 19 May 1946 (age 80)
- Place of birth: Kuala Krai, Kelantan, Malaysia
- Height: 1.68 m (5 ft 6 in)
- Position: Forward

Team information
- Current team: Kelantan

Youth career
- 1962: Kelantan Youth

Senior career*
Years	Team	Apps	(Gls)
1963–1966	ATM		
1967–1971	Kelantan		
1972–1977	Perth Azzuri		

International career
1963	Malaysia U-19		
1966–1967	Malaysia		
- * Club domestic league appearances and goals

Dali Omar is a former Malaysian footballer. He played for the Armed Forces and Kelantan in the Malaysia Cup. In 1972, he moved to Australia and played for Perth Azzuri.

== Honours ==
=== Club ===
ATM

- Malaysia Cup

Runners up: 1966

Kelantan

- Malaysia Cup

Runners up: 1970

- Malaysia FAM Cup

Runners up: 1971

=== International ===
Malaysia U-19

- Asian Schools Football Championship: 1963
- AFC U-19 Championship: Third Place 1964

=== Individual ===
- Asian Schools Football Championship Top Scorer: 1963
- Malaysia Cup Top Scorer: 1966
