= Emmanuel Noruega =

Macau football coach and former player

Emmanuel Noruega 羅維加
Personal information
- Full name: Emmanuel Libano Noruega
- Date of birth: 23 August 1983 (age 43)
- Place of birth: Macau
- Height: 1.72 m (5 ft 7 1/2 in)
- Position: Right back

Team information
- Current team: Macau (caretaker)

Youth career
- Tim Iec
- Benfica Macau
- Enfermagem
- Kei Lun
- Son Lun

Senior career*
Years	Team	Apps	(Gls)
2001–2002	CD Odiáxere		
2002–2003	Monte Carlo		
2003–2013	Lam Pak	32	(1)
2013–2014	Lam Ieng	21	(0)
2016–2017	Artilheiros		
2017–2023	MUST CPK	31	(0)
Total		84	(1)

International career
2003–2007	Macau	7	(0)

Managerial career
- 2024: MUST CPK (player coach)
- ????–2024: MUST CPK (assistant coach)
- 2024: MUST CPK
- 2024–2025: Macau (assistant coach)
- 2024–2025: Macau U-23 (assistant coach)
- 2024–2025: Macau U-20 (assistant coach)
- 2026–: Macau (caretaker)
- 2026–: Macau U-20 (caretaker)
- 2026–: Macau U-23 (caretaker)
- * Club domestic league appearances and goals

Emmanuel Libano Noruega (born 23 August 1983) is a Macau football coach and former player, who is currently caretaker manager for Macau national team and the youth teams. He was a defender who has been capped by the Macau national team.

== Club career ==
He began his club career in 2001 with Odiáxere . He moved to Macau the following year to play for Monte Carlo for one season. He achieved prominence playing for Lam Pak between 2003 and 2012. His last club was MUST CPK.

Also called up to the Macau national team since 2003 until 2007, Noruega made seven appearances, without scoring any goals.

== Managerial career ==
Noruega began his transition into coaching while still registered as a player at MUST CPK, briefly serving as a player-coach and assistant coach before taking over as the club's manager in 2024.

Later that year, he entered the international setup for the Macau Football Association, working concurrently as an assistant coach for the senior national team, the under-23 team, and the under-20 team through 2025.

On 1 January 2026, Noruega was appointed as the caretaker manager for the Macau senior national team, as well as the caretaker head coach for both the Macau U-23 and Macau U-20 squads. He led the senior team during the 2026 FIFA Series, which included international fixtures against sides like Aruba.

== Honours ==
=== Player ===
GD Lam Pak

Liga de Elite 2006, 2007, 2009

Taça de Macau 2012

CD Monte Carlo

Liga de Elite 2003

MUST Chao Pak Kei

Liga de Elite 2019, 2021, 2022

Taça de Macau 2018, 2021
