= AFC U-20 Asian Cup =

Asian football tournament

- Organiser(s): AFC
- Founded: 1959; 67 years ago
- Region: Asia (including Australia)
- Teams: 16
- Related competitions: AFC U-20 Women's Asian Cup
- Current champions: Australia (1st title)
- Most championships: South Korea (12 titles)
- Website: the-afc.com
- 2027 AFC U-20 Asian Cup

The AFC U-20 Asian Cup, formerly known as the AFC Youth Championship and AFC U-19 Championship, is a biennial international association football competition organised by the Asian Football Confederation (AFC) for the men's under-20 national teams of Asia that also serves as a qualification tournament for the FIFA U-20 World Cup. The competition has been held since 1959. Between 1959 and 1978, the tournament was held annually (without qualification); since 1980, it has been held every two years. The 1980 AFC Youth Championship had a qualification stage for first time.

The tournament has been played in a number of different formats during its existence. Currently, it consists of two stages, similar to the AFC's other Asian Championship competitions. The qualifying stage is open to all AFC members and the final stage is contested between 16 teams. The most recent edition, the 42nd, was held in China. The AFC switched the tournament from under-19 to under-20 starting from 2023. Moreover, the tournament was also rebranded from the "AFC U-19 Championship" to the "AFC U-20 Asian Cup".

== Results ==
Host nations of the tournaments as of 2023
- Coordinate is based on the capital of the country.

Tournament names

- 1959–2006: AFC Youth Championship
- 2008–2020: AFC U-19 Championship
- 2023–present: AFC U-20 Asian Cup

Ed.	Year	Hosts	Final			Third place match		
Ed.	Year	Hosts	Champions	Score	Runners-up	Third place	Score	Fourth place
1	1959	Malaya	South Korea	^{3}	Malaya	Japan	^{3}	Hong Kong
2	1960	Malaya	South Korea	4–0	Malaya	Japan	3–2	Indonesia
3	1961	Thailand	Indonesia; Burma	0–0^{1}		Thailand	2–1	South Vietnam
4	1962	Thailand	Thailand	2–1	South Korea	Indonesia	3–0	Malaya
5	1963	Malaya	South Korea; Burma	2–2^{1}		Thailand; Hong Kong	2–2^{2}	
6	1964	South Vietnam	Burma; Israel	0–0^{1}		Malaysia	5–1	South Korea
7	1965	Japan	Israel	5–0	Burma	Malaysia	4–1	Hong Kong
8	1966	Philippines	Israel; Burma	1–1^{1}		Taiwan; Thailand	0–0^{2}	
9	1967	Thailand	Israel	3–0	Indonesia	Burma	4–0	Singapore
10	1968	South Korea	Burma	4–0	Malaysia	South Korea; Israel	0–0^{2}	
11	1969	Thailand	Burma; Thailand	2–2^{1}		Iran	2–1	Israel
12	1970	Philippines	Burma	3–0	Indonesia	South Korea	5–0	Japan
13	1971	Japan	Israel	1–0	South Korea	Burma	2–0	Japan
14	1972	Thailand	Israel	1–0	South Korea	Iran	3–0	Thailand
15	1973	Iran	Iran	2–0	Japan	South Korea	3–0	Saudi Arabia
16	1974	Thailand	India; Iran	2–2^{1}		South Korea	2–1	Thailand
17	1975	Kuwait	Iraq; Iran	0–0^{1}		Kuwait; North Korea	2–2^{2}	
18	1976	Thailand	Iran; North Korea	0–0^{1}		South Korea	2–1	Thailand
19	1977	Iran	Iraq	4–3	Iran	Bahrain	3–1	Japan
20	1978	Bangladesh	Iraq; South Korea	1–1^{1}		North Korea; Kuwait	1–1^{2}	
—	1979	China	Canceled due to problems with the South Korean national team's entry into China					
21	1980	Thailand	South Korea	^{3}	Qatar	Japan	^{3}	Thailand
22	1982	Thailand	South Korea	^{3}	China	Iraq	^{3}	United Arab Emirates
23	1985	United Arab Emirates	China	^{3}	Saudi Arabia	United Arab Emirates	^{3}	Thailand
24	1986	Saudi Arabia	Saudi Arabia	2–0	Bahrain	North Korea	1–0	Qatar
25	1988	Qatar	Iraq	1–1 (5–4 p)	Syria	Qatar	2–0	United Arab Emirates
26	1990	Indonesia	South Korea	0–0 (4–3 p)	North Korea	Syria	1–0	Qatar
27	1992	United Arab Emirates	Saudi Arabia	2–0	South Korea	Japan	3–0	United Arab Emirates
28	1994	Indonesia	Syria	2–1	Japan	Thailand	1–1 (3–2 p)	Iraq
29	1996	South Korea	South Korea	3–0	China	United Arab Emirates	2–2 (4–3 p)	Japan
30	1998	Thailand	South Korea	2–1	Japan	Saudi Arabia	3–1	Kazakhstan
31	2000	Iran	Iraq	2–1 (a.e.t.)	Japan	China	2–2 (a.e.t.) (6–5 p)	Iran
32	2002	Qatar	South Korea	1–0 (a.e.t.)	Japan	Saudi Arabia	4–0	Uzbekistan
33	2004	Malaysia	South Korea	2–0	China	Japan	1–1 (4–3 p)	Syria
34	2006	India	North Korea	1–1 (a.e.t.) (5–3 p)	Japan	South Korea	2–0	Jordan
Ed.	Year	Hosts	Final			Losing semi-finalists^{4}		
Ed.	Year	Hosts	Champions	Score	Runners-up	Losing semi-finalists^{4}		
35	2008	Saudi Arabia	United Arab Emirates	2–1	Uzbekistan	Australia and South Korea		
36	2010	China	North Korea	3–2	Australia	Saudi Arabia and South Korea		
37	2012	United Arab Emirates	South Korea	1–1 (4–1 p)	Iraq	Australia and Uzbekistan		
38	2014	Myanmar	Qatar	1–0	North Korea	Myanmar and Uzbekistan		
39	2016	Bahrain	Japan	0–0 (a.e.t.) (5–3 p)	Saudi Arabia	Iran and Vietnam		
40	2018	Indonesia	Saudi Arabia	2–1	South Korea	Japan and Qatar		
—	2020	Uzbekistan	Cancelled due to COVID-19 pandemic					
41	2023	Uzbekistan	Uzbekistan	1–0	Iraq	Japan and South Korea		
42	2025	China	Australia	1–1 (a.e.t.) (5–4 p)	Saudi Arabia	Japan and South Korea		
43	2027	China		–				
44	2029	China		–				

Notes

^{1} Title shared.
^{2} Third place shared.
^{3} Final tournaments in round-robin format.
^{4} No third place match played since 2008; losing semi-finalists are listed in alphabetical order.

== Teams reaching the top four ==
Team	Champions	Runners-up	Third place	Fourth place	Semi-finalists	Total (top 4)
South Korea	12 (1959, 1960, 1963, 1978, 1980, 1982, 1990, 1996, 1998, 2002, 2004, 2012)	5 (1962, 1971, 1972, 1992, 2018)	6 (1968, 1970, 1973, 1974, 1976, 2006)	1 (1964)	4 (2008, 2010, 2023, 2025)	28
Myanmar	7 (1961, 1963, 1964, 1966, 1968, 1969, 1970)	1 (1965)	2 (1967, 1971)	–	1 (2014)	11
Israel	6 (1964, 1965, 1966, 1967, 1971, 1972)	–	1 (1968)	1 (1969)	–	8
Iraq	5 (1975, 1977, 1978, 1988, 2000)	2 (2012, 2023)	1 (1982)	1 (1994)	–	9
Iran	4 (1973, 1974, 1975, 1976)	1 (1977)	2 (1969, 1972)	1 (2000)	1 (2016)	9
Saudi Arabia	3 (1986, 1992, 2018)	3 (1985, 2016, 2025)	2 (1998, 2002)	1 (1973)	1 (2010)	10
North Korea	3 (1976, 2006, 2010)	2 (1990, 2014)	3 (1975, 1978, 1986)	–	–	8
Thailand	2 (1962, 1969)	–	4 (1961, 1963, 1966, 1994)	5 (1972, 1974, 1976, 1980, 1985)	–	11
Japan	1 (2016)	6 (1973, 1994, 1998, 2000, 2002, 2006)	5 (1959, 1960, 1980, 1992, 2004)	4 (1970, 1971, 1977, 1996)	3 (2018, 2023, 2025)	19
China	1 (1985)	3 (1982, 1996, 2004)	1 (2000)	–	–	5
Indonesia	1 (1961)	2 (1967, 1970)	1 (1962)	1 (1960)	–	5
Qatar	1 (2014)	1 (1980)	1 (1988)	2 (1986, 1990)	1 (2018)	6
Syria	1 (1994)	1 (1988)	1 (1990)	1 (2004)	–	4
Uzbekistan	1 (2023)	1 (2008)	–	1 (2002)	2 (2012, 2014)	5
Australia	1 (2025)	1 (2010)	–	–	2 (2008, 2012)	4
United Arab Emirates	1 (2008)	–	2 (1985, 1996)	3 (1982, 1988, 1992)	–	6
India	1 (1974)	–	–	–	–	1
Malaysia	–	3 (1959, 1960, 1968)	2 (1964, 1965)	1 (1962)	–	6
Bahrain	–	1 (1986)	1 (1977)	–	–	2
Kuwait	–	–	2 (1975, 1978)	–	–	2
Hong Kong	–	–	1 (1963)	2 (1959, 1965)	–	3
Chinese Taipei	–	–	1 (1966)	–	–	1
Vietnam	–	–	–	1 (1961)	1 (2016)	2
Singapore	–	–	–	1 (1967)	–	1
Kazakhstan	–	–	–	1 (1998)	–	1
Jordan	–	–	–	1 (2006)	–	1
Total (as of 2025)	51	33	39	29	16	168

Notes:

- Bold Italic indicates hosts for that year.
- Total (42 editions): Nine editions shared champions, five editions shared third place, and eight editions with no third place match.

== Awards ==
Tournament	Most Valuable Player	Top goalscorer	Goals	Fair play award
1978 Bangladesh	Unknown	(Iraq) Haris Mohammed	7	Unknown
1980 Thailand	(South Korea) Choi Soon-ho	(South Korea) Choi Soon-ho	4	Unknown
1996 South Korea	(South Korea) Kim Do-kyun	(China) Wang Peng	6	Unknown
1998 Thailand	(Japan) Shinji Ono	(South Korea) Lee Dong-gook (Japan) Masashi Motoyama	5	Unknown
2000 Iran	Unknown	(Iraq) Emad Mohammed	4	Unknown
2002 Qatar	(South Korea) Kim Dong-hyun	Unknown		South Korea
2004 Malaysia	(South Korea) Park Chu-young	(South Korea) Park Chu-young	6	Unknown
2006 India	(North Korea) Kim Kum-il	(South Korea) Shim Young-sung	5	North Korea
2008 Saudi Arabia	(United Arab Emirates) Ahmed Khalil	(United Arab Emirates) Ahmed Khalil (Japan) Kensuke Nagai	4	Uzbekistan
2010 China	(North Korea) Jong Il-gwan	(Australia) Kerem Bulut	7	Unknown
2012 United Arab Emirates	(Iraq) Mohannad Abdul-Raheem	(Uzbekistan) Igor Sergeev	7	Iraq
2014 Myanmar	(Qatar) Ahmed Moein	(Qatar) Ahmed Al Saadi	5	North Korea
2016 Bahrain	(Japan) Ritsu Dōan	(Saudi Arabia) Sami Al-Najei	4	Japan
2018 Indonesia	(Saudi Arabia) Turki Al-Ammar	(Qatar) Abdulrasheed Umaru	7	Saudi Arabia
2023 Uzbekistan	(Uzbekistan) Abbosbek Fayzullaev	(Japan) Naoki Kumata	5	Uzbekistan
2025 China	(Australia) Alexander Badolato	(Uzbekistan) Mukhammadali Urinboev	4	Australia

== Comprehensive team results by tournament ==
Legend:

- 1st – Champions
- 2nd – Runners-up
- 3rd – Third place
- 4th – Fourth place
- SF – Semi-finalists
- QF – Quarter-finals
- GS – Group stage
- q – Qualified for upcoming tournament
- DQ – Disqualified
- •• – Qualified but withdrew
- • – Did not qualify
- × – Did not enter/(2026-present) Relegated to the qualifiers’ development phase
- × – Withdrew / Banned / Entry not accepted by FIFA
- — Country not affiliated to AFC at that time
- — Country did not exist or national team was inactive
- – Hosts
- – Not affiliated to FIFA

=== 1959–1978 ===
Nation	(Federation of Malaya) 1959	(Federation of Malaya) 1960	(Thailand) 1961	(Thailand) 1962	(Federation of Malaya) 1963	(South Vietnam) 1964	(Japan) 1965	(Philippines) 1966	(Thailand) 1967	(South Korea) 1968	(Thailand) 1969	(Philippines) 1970	(Japan) 1971	(Thailand) 1972	(Iran) 1973	(Thailand) 1974	(Kuwait) 1975	(Thailand) 1976	(Iran) 1977	(Bangladesh) 1978
Afghanistan	×	×	×	×	×	×	×	×	×	×	×	×	×	×	×	×	GS	×	QF	GS
Australia																				
Bahrain	×	×	×	×	×	×	×	×	×	×	×	×	×	×	GS	×	QF	×	3rd	QF
Bangladesh	×	×	×	×	×	×	×	×	×	×	×	×	×	×	×	×	GS	×	GS	GS
Bhutan	×	×	×	×	×	×	×	×	×	×	×	×	×	×	×	×	×	×	×	×
Brunei	×	×	×	×	×	×	×	×	×	×	×	GS	×	GS	×	GS	GS	×	×	×
Cambodia	×	×	×	×	GS	×	×	×	×	×	×	×	×	GS	×	GS	×	×	×	×
China	×	×	×	×	×	×	×	×	×	×	×	×	×	×	×	×	QF	QF	×	GS
Chinese Taipei	×	×	GS	×	×	×	×	3rd	GS	GS	GS	GS	GS	GS	×	GS	×	×	×	×
Guam	×	×	×	×	×	×	×	×	×	×	×	×	×	×	×	×	×	×	×	×
Hong Kong	4th	×	×	GS	3rd	×	4th	QF	GS	GS	GS	QF	GS	GS	GS	QF	QF	GS	GS	×
India	×	×	×	×	GS	GS	GS	QF	QF	GS	×	×	QF	GS	GS	1st	GS	GS	QF	GS
Indonesia	×	4th	1st	3rd	×	×	×	×	2nd	×	GS	2nd	GS	QF	GS	×	GS	QF	×	QF
Iran	×	×	×	×	×	×	×	×	×	×	3rd	QF	QF	3rd	1st	1st	1st	1st	2nd	QF
Iraq	×	×	×	×	×	×	×	×	×	×	×	×	×	×	×	×	1st	QF	1st	1st
Israel	×	×	×	×	×	1st	1st	1st	1st	3rd	4th	QF	1st	1st	×	×	×	×	×	×
Japan	3rd	3rd	GS	GS	GS	GS	GS	GS	GS	GS	QF	4th	4th	QF	2nd	QF	GS	GS	4th	GS
Jordan	×	×	×	×	×	×	×	×	×	×	×	×	×	×	×	×	×	×	GS	GS
Kazakhstan																				
Kuwait	×	×	×	×	×	×	×	×	×	×	×	×	QF	×	×	×	3rd	GS	×	3rd
Kyrgyzstan																				
Laos	×	×	×	×	×	×	×	×	×	×	GS	QF	×	GS	×	GS	×	×	×	×
Lebanon	×	×	×	×	×	×	×	×	×	×	×	×	×	×	QF	×	×	×	×	×
Macau	×	×	×	×	×	×	×	×	×	×	×	×	×	×	×	×	×	×	×	×
Malaysia	2nd	2nd	GS	4th	GS	3rd	3rd	QF	GS	2nd	QF	GS	QF	GS	GS	QF	GS	GS	GS	GS
Maldives	×	×	×	×	×	×	×	×	×	×	×	×	×	×	×	×	×	×	×	×
Mongolia	×	×	×	×	×	×	×	×	×	×	×	×	×	×	×	×	×	×	×	×
Myanmar	6th	GS	1st	GS	1st	1st	2nd	1st	3rd	1st	1st	1st	3rd	QF	QF	GS	GS	QF	×	×
Nepal	×	×	×	×	×	×	×	×	×	×	×	×	GS	GS	×	GS	×	×	×	×
North Korea	×	×	×	×	×	×	×	×	×	×	×	×	×	×	×	×	3rd	1st	×	3rd
Oman	×	×	×	×	×	×	×	×	×	×	×	×	×	×	×	×	×	×	×	×
Pakistan	×	×	×	GS	×	×	×	×	×	×	×	×	×	×	GS	×	×	×	×	×
Palestine	×	×	×	×	×	×	×	×	×	×	×	×	×	×	×	×	×	×	×	×
Philippines	9th	GS	×	×	GS	×	GS	GS	GS	R2	GS	GS	GS	GS	×	GS	GS	×	×	×
Qatar	×	×	×	×	×	×	×	×	×	×	×	×	×	×	×	×	×	×	×	×
Saudi Arabia	×	×	×	×	×	×	×	×	×	×	×	×	×	×	4th	×	×	×	QF	QF
Singapore	7th	GS	GS	GS	GS	×	×	GS	4th	GS	GS	GS	GS	QF	QF	QF	GS	GS	GS	GS
South Korea	1st	1st	GS	2nd	1st	4th	GS	QF	GS	3rd	QF	3rd	2nd	2nd	3rd	3rd	×	3rd	QF	1st
South Yemen							×	×	×	×	×	×	×	×	×	×	QF	×	×	×
Sri Lanka	8th	×	GS	×	GS	×	×	GS	QF	×	GS	GS	×	×	×	×	×	GS	×	GS
Syria	×	×	×	×	×	×	×	×	×	×	×	×	×	×	×	×	GS	×	×	×
Tajikistan																				
Thailand	5th	GS	3rd	1st	3rd	GS	GS	3rd	QF	R2	1st	GS	GS	4th	QF	4th	×	4th	×	×
Timor-Leste																				
Turkmenistan																				
United Arab Emirates	×	×	×	×	×	×	×	×	×	×	×	×	×	×	×	×	×	×	×	×
Uzbekistan																				
Vietnam	×	×	4th	GS	GS	GS	GS	×	QF	GS	QF	GS	GS	×	×	GS	×	×	×	×
Yemen	×	×	×	×	×	×	×	×	×	×	×	×	×	×	×	×	×	×	×	GS

=== 1980–2018 ===
Nation	(Thailand) 1980	(Thailand) 1982	(United Arab Emirates) 1985	(Saudi Arabia) 1986	(Qatar) 1988	(Indonesia) 1990	(United Arab Emirates) 1992	(Indonesia) 1994	(South Korea) 1996	(Thailand) 1998	(Iran) 2000	(Qatar) 2002	(Malaysia) 2004	(India) 2006	(Saudi Arabia) 2008	(China) 2010	(United Arab Emirates) 2012	(Myanmar) 2014	(Bahrain) 2016	(Indonesia) 2018
Afghanistan	×	×	×	•	×	×	×	×	×	×	×	×	•	×	DQ	•	×	•	•	×
Australia	Part of OFC													QF	SF	2nd	SF	GS	GS	QF
Bahrain	×	•	•	2nd	•	GS	•	GS	•	•	•	•	•	•	•	GS	•	•	QF	•
Bangladesh	5th	×	•	×	•	•	•	×	GS	•	•	GS	•	•	×	•	•	•	•	•
Bhutan	×	×	×	×	×	×	×	×	×	•	×	×	•	•	•	×	•	×	•	×
Brunei	•	×	×	×	×	×	×	•	×	•	•	•	•	•	×	×	×	•	•	•
Cambodia	×	×	×	×	×	×	×	×	×	×	•	•	•	×	×	×	×	×	×	•
China	•	2nd	1st	•	GS	•	•	•	2nd	GS	3rd	QF	2nd	QF	QF	QF	GS	QF	GS	GS
Chinese Taipei	×	×	Part of OFC			•	•	•	•	•	•	•	•	•	•	•	•	•	•	GS
Guam	×	×	×	×	×	×	×	•	×	×	•	•	•	•	•	•	•	×	×	×
Hong Kong	•	•	•	•	×	•	•	×	•	×	•	•	•	•	×	•	×	•	•	•
India	•	•	•	GS	×	GS	GS	×	GS	GS	•	QF	GS	GS	•	•	•	•	•	•
Indonesia	•	•	•	GS	×	GS	•	GS	•	×	•	•	GS	•	•	•	•	GS	×	QF
Iran	×	×	×	×	•	×	GS	×	GS	•	4th	•	GS	GS	GS	GS	QF	GS	SF	•
Iraq	×	3rd	•	•	1st	×	×	4th	×	GS	1st	•	QF	QF	GS	GS	2nd	GS	QF	GS
Israel	Part of OFC and later UEFA																			
Japan	3rd	•	•	•	GS	GS	3rd	2nd	4th	2nd	2nd	2nd	3rd	2nd	QF	QF	QF	QF	1st	SF
Jordan	×	×	×	×	×	×	×	×	•	×	•	•	•	4th	GS	GS	QF	•	•	GS
Kazakhstan							×	GS	•	4th	•	Part of UEFA								
Kuwait	×	•	•	•	•	×	•	GS	•	GS	GS	•	•	•	•	•	GS	•	•	×
Kyrgyzstan							×	×	•	•	•	•	•	GS	×	•	×	×	•	•
Laos	×	×	×	×	×	×	×	×	×	•	•	•	GS	•	•	•	•	•	•	•
Lebanon	×	×	×	×	•	×	•	×	•	×	•	×	•	•	GS	×	•	•	•	•
Macau	×	×	×	•	•	•	•	×	•	•	•	•	•	•	•	•	•	•	•	•
Malaysia	•	•	×	•	×	•	•	•	•	•	•	•	QF	GS	•	•	•	•	•	GS
Maldives	×	×	×	•	•	•	•	×	•	•	•	•	•	•	•	×	•	•	•	•
Mongolia	×	×	×	×	×	×	×	×	×	×	•	•	•	•	×	×	×	×	×	×
Myanmar	×	×	×	×	×	×	×	•	×	×	•	•	•	×	•	•	•	SF	•	•
Nepal	•	•	×	•	×	•	•	×	•	•	•	•	GS	•	•	•	×	•	•	•
New Zealand	OFC member						GS	OFC member												
North Korea	×	DQ	×	3rd	GS	2nd	×	×	×	•	×	×	×	1st	QF	1st	GS	2nd	GS	GS
Northern Mariana Islands	Not member of AFC															×	×	×	•	×
Oman	•	•	×	•	•	•	•	×	•	×	GS	•	•	•	•	•	•	GS	•	•
Pakistan	×	•	•	•	•	•	•	×	•	•	GS	•	•	•	•	•	•	×	×	×
Palestine	×	×	×	×	×	×	×	×	×	×	×	•	•	•	DQ	•	•	•	•	•
Philippines	•	•	×	×	×	×	•	×	×	•	•	•	•	•	×	•	×	•	•	•
Qatar	2nd	×	•	4th	3rd	4th	GS	GS	GS	GS	•	GS	QF	•	•	•	GS	1st	GS	SF
Saudi Arabia	×	•	2nd	1st	×	•	1st	×	•	3rd	•	3rd	•	QF	QF	SF	GS	•	2nd	1st
Singapore	•	•	•	•	×	×	•	•	•	•	•	•	•	•	•	•	•	•	•	•
South Korea	1st	1st	•	GS	GS	1st	2nd	GS	1st	1st	GS	1st	1st	3rd	SF	SF	1st	GS	GS	2nd
South Yemen	×	•	•	×	•	×														
Sri Lanka	×	×	×	GS	×	•	×	•	•	×	•	•	•	•	×	•	×	×	•	•
Syria	×	•	•	•	2nd	3rd	•	1st	GS	•	•	QF	4th	•	GS	GS	QF	×	•	•
Tajikistan							×	×	•	•	•	•	•	GS	GS	•	•	•	QF	QF
Thailand	4th	•	4th	•	•	•	GS	3rd	GS	GS	GS	GS	GS	GS	GS	GS	GS	QF	GS	QF
Timor-Leste														×	×	DQ	×	×	×	•
Turkmenistan							×	×	•	•	•	•	••	•	•	×	•	•	•	•
United Arab Emirates	×	4th	3rd	•	4th	•	4th	•	3rd	•	GS	QF	•	GS	1st	QF	GS	QF	GS	GS
Uzbekistan							×	×	•	•	•	4th	QF	•	2nd	QF	SF	SF	QF	•
Vietnam	×	×	×	×	×	×	×	×	•	•	•	GS	GS	GS	•	GS	GS	GS	SF	GS
Yemen	×	•	×	×	×	•	•	×	×	•	•	•	GS	•	GS	GS	•	GS	GS	•

=== 2023–present ===
Nation	2023	2025	2027	2029	Total
Afghanistan	•	•	•		3
Australia	QF	1st	•		9
Bahrain	•	•	•		9
Bangladesh	•	•	•	×	6
Bhutan	•	•	×	×	0
Brunei	•	•	×	×	4
Cambodia	•	•	•	×	3
China	QF	QF	Q	Q	21
Chinese Taipei	•	•	×		10
Guam	•	•	×	×	0
Hong Kong	•	•	•	×	16
India	•	•	Q		22
Indonesia	GS	GS	Q		20
Iran	QF	QF	Q		22
Iraq	2nd	QF	Q		19
Japan	SF	SF	Q		39
Jordan	QF	GS	Q		9
Kuwait	•	•	•		8
Kyrgyzstan	GS	GS	•		3
Laos	•	•	•	×	5
Lebanon	•	•	Q		2
Macau	×	•	×	×	0
Malaysia	•	•	Q		23
Maldives	•	•	×		0
Mongolia	•	•	×		0
Myanmar	•	•	×		19
Nepal	•	•	×	×	4
North Korea	×	GS	Q		14
Northern Mariana Islands	•	•	×	×	0
Oman	GS	•	Q		3
Pakistan	×	×	×	×	3
Palestine	•	•	•		0
Philippines	•	•	×	×	13
Qatar	GS	GS	•		16
Saudi Arabia	GS	2nd	Q		16
Singapore	•	•	×		18
South Korea	SF	SF	Q		40
Sri Lanka	•	•	×	×	10
Syria	GS	GS	•		12
Tajikistan	GS	•	Q		5
Thailand	•	GS	Q		34
Timor-Leste	•	•	×	×	0
Turkmenistan	•	•	•		0
United Arab Emirates	•	•	•		14
Uzbekistan	1st	QF	Q		9
Vietnam	GS	•	•	×	20
Yemen	•	GS	•		7

== Overall team records ==
In this ranking 3 points are awarded for a win, 1 for a draw and 0 for a loss. As per statistical convention in football, matches decided in extra time are counted as wins and losses, while matches decided by penalty shoot-outs are counted as draws. Teams are ranked by total points, then by goal difference, then by goals scored.

As of 2025 AFC U-20 Asian Cup

Rank	Team	Part	M	W	D	L	GF	GA	GD	Points
1	South Korea	40	195	114	49	32	386	156	+230	391
2	Japan	39	178	75	36	67	311	242	+69	261
3	Myanmar	19	94	60	15	19	242	84	+158	195
4	Iran	22	96	58	18	20	201	76	+125	192
5	Thailand	34	141	52	25	64	230	223	+7	181
6	Saudi Arabia	16	78	46	15	17	151	82	+69	152
7	Iraq	19	85	42	23	20	160	84	+76	149
8	Israel^{1}	9	49	37	8	4	138	14	+124	119
9	China	20	80	33	19	28	117	101	+16	118
10	Malaysia	23	88	35	13	41	159	161	−2	118
11	North Korea	14	68	31	16	21	101	66	+35	109
12	Qatar	16	65	29	9	27	104	104	0	96
13	Indonesia	19	76	27	15	34	116	129	−13	96
14	India	22	80	22	16	42	95	145	−50	82
15	Uzbekistan	9	44	22	13	9	70	51	+19	79
16	Syria	12	50	22	11	17	76	56	+20	77
17	Australia	9	40	21	11	8	73	42	+31	74
18	Vietnam^{2}	20	69	19	13	37	74	142	−68	70
19	United Arab Emirates	14	56	18	15	23	83	80	+3	69
20	Hong Kong	16	60	20	9	31	96	132	−36	69
21	Singapore	18	67	16	7	44	79	190	−111	55
22	Bahrain	9	37	14	10	13	47	44	+3	52
23	Kuwait	8	36	12	15	9	49	44	+5	51
24	Jordan	9	32	6	8	18	26	58	−32	26
25	Chinese Taipei	10	35	5	6	24	30	98	−68	21
26	Philippines	13	46	5	3	38	32	161	−129	18
27	Laos	5	16	4	4	8	20	29	−9	16
28	Tajikistan	5	17	4	4	9	15	30	−15	16
29	Yemen^{3}	8	27	4	4	19	19	52	−33	16
30	Sri Lanka	10	36	4	2	30	35	152	−117	14
31	Cambodia	3	11	3	1	7	14	26	−12	10
32	Pakistan	3	11	3	0	8	12	35	−23	9
33	Kazakhstan	2	10	2	2	6	15	25	−10	8
34	Bangladesh	6	21	1	5	15	10	53	−43	8
35	Lebanon	2	7	1	3	3	5	13	−8	6
36	Oman	3	10	0	4	6	3	20	−17	4
37	Kyrgyzstan	3	9	0	3	6	5	27	−22	3
38	Nepal	4	12	1	0	11	6	47	−41	3
39	Afghanistan	3	10	0	2	8	4	31	−27	2
40	New Zealand^{4}	1	4	0	0	4	2	13	−11	0
41	Brunei	4	13	0	0	13	3	94	−91	0

^{1} No AFC member currently.
^{2} Represented South Vietnam from 1959 to 1974.
^{3} Representing South Yemen in 1975 and North Yemen in 1978.
^{4} Not an AFC member: participated in tournament as part of intercontinental play-off to qualify for the 1993 FIFA World Youth Championship.

== FIFA U-20 World Cup performances ==
Legend

- 1st – Champions
- 2nd – Runners-up
- 3rd – Third place
- 4th – Fourth place
- QF – Quarter-finals
- R2 – Round 2
- R1 – Round 1
- – Hosts
- – Not affiliated to AFC
- q – Qualified for upcoming tournament

=== 1977–2019 ===
Team	(Tunisia) 1977	(Japan) 1979	(Australia) 1981	(Mexico) 1983	(Soviet Union) 1985	(Chile) 1987	(Saudi Arabia) 1989	(Portugal) 1991	(Australia) 1993	(Qatar) 1995	(Malaysia) 1997	(Nigeria) 1999	(Argentina) 2001	(United Arab Emirates) 2003	(Netherlands) 2005	(Canada) 2007	(Egypt) 2009	(Colombia) 2011	(Turkey) 2013	(New Zealand) 2015	(South Korea) 2017	(Poland) 2019	Total
Australia	OFC member																R1	R1	R1				3
Bahrain						R1																	1
China				R1	QF						R1		R2		R2								5
Indonesia		R1																					1
Iran	R1												R1								R1		3
Iraq	R1						QF						R1						4th				4
Japan		R1								QF	QF	2nd	R1	QF	R2	R2					R2	R2	10
Jordan																R1							1
Kazakhstan	Part of Soviet Union											R1		UEFA member									1
Malaysia											R1												1
Myanmar																				R1			1
North Korea																R1		R1		R1			3
Qatar			2nd							R1										R1		R1	4
Saudi Arabia					R1	R1	R1		R1			R1		R1				R2			R2	R1	9
South Korea		R1	R1	4th				QF	R1		R1	R1		R2	R1	R1	QF	R2	QF		R2	2nd	15
Syria							R1	QF		R1					R2								4
UAE											R2			QF			QF						3
Uzbekistan	Part of Soviet Union													R1			R1		QF	QF			4
Vietnam																					R1		1

=== 2023–present ===
Team	(Argentina) 2023	(Chile) 2025	(Azerbaijan) (Uzbekistan) 2027	(Armenia) (Georgia (country)) 2029	Total
Australia		R1			4
Iraq	R1				5
Japan	R1	R2			12
Saudi Arabia		R1			10
South Korea	4th	R2			17
Uzbekistan	R2		q		6

== See also ==
- FIFA U-20 World Cup
- AFC U-17 Asian Cup
- AFC U-20 Women's Asian Cup
- AFC U-23 Asian Cup
