= 2021 FIFA U-20 World Cup =

Piala Dunia U-20 FIFA 2021

Tournament details
- Host country: Indonesia
- Dates: Cancelled (originally 21 May – 12 June)
- Teams: 24 (from 6 confederations)
- Venues: 6 (in 6 host cities)

The 2021 FIFA U-20 World Cup was the planned 23rd edition of the biennial international men's youth football championship organized by FIFA for national teams under the age of 20. It was scheduled to take place in Indonesia from 21 May to 12 June 2021, which would have marked the country's first time hosting a FIFA tournament. The event was cancelled on 24 December 2020 due to the COVID-19 pandemic, and Indonesia was subsequently awarded hosting rights for the 2023 FIFA U-20 World Cup; however, those rights were revoked on 29 March 2023 after Indonesia refused to host Israel.

Ukraine were the defending champions but failed to qualify after the 2020 UEFA European Under-19 Championship was cancelled. The 2021 edition would have been the second U-20 World Cup held in Southeast Asia, following the 1997 tournament, and the first FIFA event in the region since the 2012 FIFA Futsal World Cup.

== Host selection ==
The bidding procedure to host the 2021 FIFA U-20 World Cup was launched by FIFA on 23 April 2019, with the following timeline:

- 23 April 2019 – FIFA opens bidding process.
- 21 May 2019 – Deadline for national associations to declare interest of hosting to FIFA.
- 24 May 2019 – FIFA sends bidding and hosting documents to those national associations that have declared an interest.
- 21 June 2019 – Deadline for national associations to confirm their interest submitting the signed terms and conditions.
- 30 August 2019 – Deadline for national associations to submit their definitive bids with all signed bidding and hosting documents.
- 24 October 2019 – Appointment of the host by the FIFA Council.

Five bids to host the tournament were submitted per 23 May 2019, which were confirmed in July 2019. On 4 September 2019 there were three active bids under consideration. On 23 October 2019 it was reported that Brazil withdrew their bid due to low winning chances. The next day, Indonesia was announced as the winning bidder after the FIFA Council meeting in Shanghai, China.

- Indonesia (AFC)

Indonesia had never hosted any FIFA tournament before, however had co-hosted the 2007 AFC Asian Cup with Malaysia, Thailand and Vietnam, and solely hosted the 1962 and 2018 Asian Games.

- Peru (CONMEBOL)

Peru had hosted one FIFA tournament, the 2005 FIFA U-17 World Championship. They originally won the bid to host the 2019 FIFA U-17 World Cup but later withdrawn by FIFA.

=== Withdrawn bids ===
- Myanmar / Thailand (AFC)

Thailand had hosted the 2004 FIFA U-19 Women's World Championship and the 2012 FIFA Futsal World Cup while Myanmar had never hosted any FIFA tournament.

The joint bid of Myanmar and Thailand was withdrawn in favor of the Indonesian bid on 27 August 2019.

- Bahrain / Saudi Arabia / United Arab Emirates (AFC)

Bahrain had never hosted any FIFA tournament. Saudi Arabia had hosted four FIFA tournaments, the last three were the first three editions of the FIFA Confederations Cup, originally King Fahd Cup, named after the then-Saudi king. United Arab Emirates had held seven FIFA tournaments, namely the 2009 FIFA Beach Soccer World Cup, the 2013 FIFA U-17 World Cup, and four FIFA Club World Cups (2009, 2010, 2017, and 2018). Saudi and UAE were also the only countries in the bidding process to have hosted the U-20 World Cup before, in 1989 and 2003 respectively.

The joint bid of Bahrain, Saudi Arabia, and UAE was left out from the list of FIFA U-20 World Cup bidders on 4 September 2019.

- Brazil (CONMEBOL)

Brazil had the most impressive record of hosting FIFA tournaments among the bidding countries individually; it had hosted two men's senior FIFA World Cups (1950 and 2014), the 2016 Summer Olympics men's and women's football tournaments, the 2000 FIFA Club World Championship, the 2013 FIFA Confederations Cup, and was about to host the 2019 FIFA U-17 World Cup during the bidding process. It also hosted the 2008 FIFA Futsal World Cup and the first three editions of the FIFA-organized Beach Soccer World Cup (2005, 2006, and 2007), to make a total of 11 FIFA tournaments hosted.

Brazil withdrew on 23 October 2019 due to expectations of low winning chances according to Brazilian network Rede Globo. Had they won this bid, they would have become the first country to host all categories of FIFA-organized men's tournament (senior, U-20, U-17, Futsal, Club, and Beach Soccer).

== Qualified teams ==
A total of 24 teams would have qualified for the final tournament. In addition to Indonesia which automatically qualified as hosts, 23 other teams would have qualified from six separate continental competitions. Only teams from UEFA had secured qualification to the tournament prior to its cancellation.

Confederation	Qualifying tournament	Team	Appearance	Last appearance	Previous best performance
AFC (Asia)	Host nation	Indonesia	2nd	1979	Group stage (1979)
UEFA (Europe) (5 teams)	2020 UEFA European Under-19 Championship (cancelled due to COVID-19 pandemic in Europe, teams were nominated by UEFA)	England	12th	2017	Champions (2017)
UEFA (Europe) (5 teams)	2020 UEFA European Under-19 Championship (cancelled due to COVID-19 pandemic in Europe, teams were nominated by UEFA)	France	8th	2019	Champions (2013)
UEFA (Europe) (5 teams)	2020 UEFA European Under-19 Championship (cancelled due to COVID-19 pandemic in Europe, teams were nominated by UEFA)	Italy	8th	2019	Third place (2017)
UEFA (Europe) (5 teams)	2020 UEFA European Under-19 Championship (cancelled due to COVID-19 pandemic in Europe, teams were nominated by UEFA)	Netherlands	5th	2005	Quarter-finals (1983, 2001, 2005)
UEFA (Europe) (5 teams)	2020 UEFA European Under-19 Championship (cancelled due to COVID-19 pandemic in Europe, teams were nominated by UEFA)	Portugal	13th	2019	Champions (1989, 1991)
