= 2002 AFC Youth Championship =

Tournament details
- Host country: Qatar
- Dates: 15–31 October
- Teams: 12 (from 1 confederation)
- Venues: 2 (in 1 host city)

Final positions
- Champions: South Korea (10th title)
- Runners-up: Japan
- Third place: Saudi Arabia
- Fourth place: Uzbekistan

Tournament statistics
- Matches played: 26
- Goals scored: 94 (3.62 per match)
- Best player: (South Korea) Kim Dong-hyun
- Fair play award: South Korea

The 2002 AFC Youth Championship was the 32nd edition of the AFC Youth Championship, the biennial international youth football championship organised by the Asian Football Confederation (AFC) for the men's under-19 national teams of Asia. The tournament took place in Qatar, between 15 and 31 October 2002. A total of 12 teams played in the championship which included Uzbekistan who was competing in their first AFC tournament.

The 12 teams were separated into three groups of four teams with the top two teams and the best two of the third place teams qualifying through to the knockout-stage with the winners of the quarter-finals qualifying through to the 2003 FIFA World Youth Championship in United Arab Emirates. After they finished top of Group A with seven points, South Korea would go on to claim their tenth continental youth title with a 1–0 win over Japan. Saudi Arabia and Uzbekistan also qualified for the 2003 World Youth Championship after they made it to the semi-finals defeating Syria and China in the quarter-finals.

== Venues ==
The tournament was held in two stadiums located in the city of Doha.

Doha		Location of the host city of the 2002 AFC Youth Championship.
Grand Hamad Stadium	Hamad bin Khalifa Stadium	Location of the host city of the 2002 AFC Youth Championship.
Capacity: 13,000	Capacity: 12,000	Location of the host city of the 2002 AFC Youth Championship.

== Qualification competition ==
40 teams entered qualifying for the 2002 edition of the youth championship with the qualifying phase being played from the 13 March to 23 July 2002 with the teams being separated into the east and west zone. Before the draw was announced, Afghanistan withdrew with Lebanon and North Korea withdrawing after the draw was announced which meant that their groups only had three teams competing.

The first qualifying match was played on the 13 March in Group 11 when Singapore took on Myanmar in Singapore with Myanmar winning the match 1–0. Four teams who competed in the previous edition didn't qualify for the 2002 edition with them being replaced by Syria, Saudi Arabia, Bangladesh and India. With the tournament expanding to 12 teams for the 2002 edition, Vietnam made their first appearance in the Asian competition since 1974 while Uzbekistan was making their debut in the tournament after finishing top of their group ahead of Turkmenistan and Nepal.

- Bangladesh
- China
- India
- Japan
- South Korea
- Saudi Arabia
- Syria
- Thailand
- United Arab Emirates
- Uzbekistan
- Vietnam
- Qatar (Host)

== Group stage ==
=== Group A ===
Team	Pts	Pld	W	D	L	GF	GA	GD
South Korea	7	3	2	1	0	3	0	+3
Uzbekistan	6	3	2	0	1	9	6	+3
Qatar	3	3	1	0	2	7	8	-–1
Thailand	1	3	0	1	2	2	7	–5

October 15 – Grand Hamad Stadium, Doha

Qatar	0 - 1	South Korea

Uzbekistan	4 - 0	Thailand

October 18 – Hamad bin Khalifa Stadium, Doha

Qatar	3 - 2	Thailand

South Korea	2 - 0	Uzbekistan

October 21 – Grand Hamad Stadium, Doha

Qatar	4 - 5	Uzbekistan

Thailand	0 - 0	South Korea

=== Group B ===
Team	Pts	Pld	W	D	L	GF	GA	GD
Japan	9	3	3	0	0	7	2	+5
Saudi Arabia	6	3	2	0	1	9	2	+7
India	3	3	1	0	2	7	6	+1
Bangladesh	0	3	0	0	3	0	13	–13

October 16 – Hamad bin Khalifa Stadium, Doha

Japan	2 - 1	Saudi Arabia

India	6 - 0	Bangladesh

October 19 – Grand Hamad Stadium, Doha

Saudi Arabia	4 - 0	Bangladesh

India	1 - 2	Japan

October 22 – Hamad bin Khalifa Stadium, Doha

Bangladesh	0 - 3	Japan

Saudi Arabia	4 - 0	India

=== Group C ===
Team	Pts	Pld	W	D	L	GF	GA	GD
Syria	7	3	2	1	0	9	4	+5
China	4	3	1	1	1	6	6	0
United Arab Emirates	4	3	1	1	1	3	3	0
Vietnam	1	3	0	1	2	3	8	–5

October 17 – Grand Hamad Stadium, Doha

United Arab Emirates	2 - 0	Vietnam

China	2 - 4	Syria

October 20 – Hamad bin Khalifa Stadium, Doha

United Arab Emirates	1 - 1	Syria

Vietnam	2 - 2	China

October 23 – Grand Hamad Stadium, Doha

United Arab Emirates	0 - 2	China

Syria	4 - 1	Vietnam

=== Third-placed qualifiers ===
At the end of the first stage, a comparison was made between the third placed teams of each group. The two best third-placed teams advanced to the quarter-finals.

Team	Pts	Pld	W	D	L	GF	GA	GD
United Arab Emirates	4	3	1	1	1	3	3	0
India	3	3	1	0	2	7	6	+1
Qatar	3	3	1	0	2	7	8	–1

UAE (best third-place) and India (second best third-place) qualified for the quarter-finals.

== Knockout stages ==
=== Bracket ===
Quarter-finals
25 October – Doha (GHS)
Japan	3
United Arab Emirates	0
26 October – Doha (GHS)
Syria	0
Uzbekistan	4
25 October – Doha (GHS)
South Korea	7
India	0
26 October – Doha (GHS)
Saudi Arabia	4
China	1

Semi-finals
29 October – Doha (GHS)
Japan (p)	1 (4)
Uzbekistan	1 (2)
29 October – Doha (GHS)
South Korea	2
Saudi Arabia	1

Final
31 October – Doha (GHS)
Japan	0
South Korea (a.e.t.)	1
Third place
31 October – Doha (GHS)
Uzbekistan	0
Saudi Arabia	4

=== Quarter-finals ===
25 October 2002

Japan	3 – 0	United Arab Emirates

Grand Hamad Stadium, Doha

25 October 2002

South Korea	7 – 0	India

Grand Hamad Stadium, Doha

26 October 2002

Saudi Arabia	4 – 1	China

Grand Hamad Stadium, Doha

26 October 2002

Syria	0 – 4	Uzbekistan

Grand Hamad Stadium, Doha

=== Semi finals ===
29 October 2002

Japan	1 – 1	Uzbekistan
Penalties
	4 – 2

Grand Hamad Stadium, Doha

29 October 2002

South Korea	2 – 1	Saudi Arabia

Grand Hamad Stadium, Doha

=== Third-place match ===
31 October 2002

Uzbekistan	0 – 4	Saudi Arabia

Grand Hamad Stadium, Doha

=== Final ===
31 October 2002

Japan	0 – 1 (a.e.t.)	South Korea

Grand Hamad Stadium, Doha

== Winners ==
2002 AFC Youth Championship winners

South Korea
10th title

== Qualified teams for the 2003 FIFA World Youth Championship ==
The following four teams from AFC qualified for the 2003 FIFA World Youth Championship in United Arab Emirates.

Team	Qualified on	Previous appearances in FIFA U-20 World Cup^{1}
Japan	25 October 2002	5 (1979, 1995, 1997, 1999, 2001)
South Korea	25 October 2002	7 (1979, 1981, 1983, 1991, 1993, 1997, 1999)
Saudi Arabia	26 October 2002	5 (1985, 1987, 1989, 1993, 1999)
Uzbekistan	26 October 2002	Debut

^{1} Bold indicates champions for that year. Italic indicates hosts for that year.
