= 1978 AFC Youth Championship =

Tournament details
- Host country: Bangladesh
- Dates: 5–28 October
- Teams: 18 (from 1 confederation)
- Venue: 1 (in 1 host city)

Final positions
- Champions: South Korea (4th title); Iraq (3rd title)
- Third place: Kuwait; North Korea

Tournament statistics
- Matches played: 40
- Goals scored: 122 (3.05 per match)
- Top scorer: (Iraq) Haris Mohammed (7 goals)

The 1978 AFC Youth Championship was held in Dhaka, Bangladesh from 5 October to 28 October 1978. It also served as qualification for the 1979 FIFA World Youth Championship.

== Teams ==
- Afghanistan
- Bahrain
- Bangladesh
- China
- India
- Indonesia
- Iran
- Iraq
- Japan
- Jordan
- North Korea
- South Korea
- Kuwait
- Malaysia
- North Yemen
- Saudi Arabia
- Singapore
- Sri Lanka

== Venue ==
Dhaka	Dhaka is located in Bangladesh
Bangabandhu National Stadium	Dhaka is located in Bangladesh
Capacity: 55,000	Dhaka is located in Bangladesh

== Group stage ==
=== Group A ===
Team	Pld	W	D	L	GF	GA	GD	Pts
Iraq	3	3	0	0	17	0	+17	6
Indonesia	3	2	0	1	6	4	+2	4
Malaysia	3	1	0	2	3	9	−6	2
Jordan	3	0	0	3	0	13	−13	0

5 October 1978

Indonesia	0–4	Iraq

Dhaka

6 October 1978

Malaysia	3–0	Jordan

Dhaka

8 October 1978

Iraq	6–0	Jordan

Dhaka

9 October 1978

Malaysia	0–2	Indonesia

Dhaka

12 October 1978

Indonesia	4–0	Jordan

Dhaka

13 October 1978

Malaysia	0–7	Iraq

Dhaka

=== Group B ===
Team	Pld	W	D	L	GF	GA	GD	Pts
North Korea	4	3	1	0	10	1	+9	7
Saudi Arabia	4	2	2	0	11	3	+8	6
Japan	4	1	2	1	8	6	+2	4
India	4	1	1	2	7	8	−1	3
Sri Lanka	4	0	0	4	1	19	−18	0

6 October 1978

Sri Lanka	1–5	Japan

Dhaka

7 October 1978

India	0–2	(North Korea) Korea DPR

Dhaka

9 October 1978

Saudi Arabia	5–0	Sri Lanka

Dhaka

10 October 1978

Japan	2–2	India

Dhaka

11 October 1978

Sri Lanka	0–5	(North Korea) Korea DPR

Dhaka

13 October 1978

Saudi Arabia	1–1	(North Korea) Korea DPR

Dhaka

14 October 1978

India	4–0	Sri Lanka

Dhaka

16 October 1978

Saudi Arabia	4–1	India

Dhaka
16 October 1978

Japan	0–2	(North Korea) Korea DPR

Dhaka

19 October 1978

Saudi Arabia	1–1	Japan

Dhaka

=== Group C ===
Team	Pld	W	D	L	GF	GA	GD	Pts
Kuwait	4	3	1	0	10	3	+7	7
Bahrain	4	2	1	1	6	3	+3	5
Bangladesh	4	1	2	1	4	5	−1	4
North Yemen	4	1	1	2	6	3	+3	3
Singapore	4	0	1	3	3	15	−12	1

7 October 1978

Bangladesh	2–2	Singapore

Dhaka

8 October 1978

Kuwait	1–1	North Yemen

Dhaka

10 October 1978

Bahrain	3–0	Singapore

Dhaka
10 October 1978

Bangladesh	1–0	North Yemen

Dhaka

12 October 1978

Kuwait	5–1	Singapore

Dhaka

14 October 1978

Bahrain	1–0	North Yemen

Dhaka

15 October 1978

Bangladesh	0–2	Kuwait

Dhaka

17 October 1978

Singapore	0–5	North Yemen

Dhaka

18 October 1978

Kuwait	2–1	Bahrain

Dhaka

20 October 1978

Bangladesh	1–1	Bahrain

Dhaka

=== Group D ===
Team	Pld	W	D	L	GF	GA	GD	Pts
South Korea	3	2	1	0	10	2	+8	5
Iran	3	2	1	0	6	2	+4	5
China	3	1	0	2	3	4	–1	2
Afghanistan	3	0	0	3	0	11	−11	0

7 October 1978

Iran	3–0	Afghanistan

Dhaka

9 October 1978

Korea Republic (South Korea)	2–1	China

Dhaka

11 October 1978

Iran	1–1	(South Korea) Korea Republic

Dhaka
11 October 1978

China	1–0	Afghanistan

Dhaka

16 October 1978

Korea Republic (South Korea)	7–0	Afghanistan

Dhaka

17 October 1978

Iran	2–1	China

Dhaka

== Knockout stage ==
=== Quarter-finals ===
21 October 1978

Kuwait	1–0 Awarded	Iran

Dhaka
21 October 1978

Iraq	2–1	Saudi Arabia

Dhaka
22 October 1978

North Korea	2–0	Indonesia

Dhaka
23 October 1978

South Korea	1–0	Bahrain

Dhaka

Note: Iran had originally won 1–0 against Kuwait, but they were found to have fielded an over-age player; the result was reversed and Iran were ejected from the competition.

=== Semi-finals ===
25 October 1978

Iraq	0–0	Kuwait
Penalties
	6–5

Dhaka

26 October 1978

South Korea	0–0	North Korea
Penalties
	6–5

Dhaka

=== Third place play-off ===
27 October 1978

Kuwait	1–1 Third place shared	North Korea

Dhaka

=== Final ===
28 October 1978

South Korea	1–1 Title shared	Iraq

Dhaka

== Results ==
1978 AFC Youth Championship

South Korea
Fourth title

1978 AFC Youth Championship

Iraq
Third title

== Qualification to the World Youth Championship ==
The following teams qualified for the 1979 FIFA World Youth Championship.

- Indonesia, replacing semi-finalists Iraq, Kuwait, North Korea.
- Japan, as host country
- South Korea, as champions
