= 1971 AFC Youth Championship =

Tournament details
- Host country: Japan
- Dates: 24 April – 5 May
- Teams: 16

Final positions
- Champions: Israel (5th title)
- Runners-up: South Korea
- Third place: Burma
- Fourth place: Japan

Tournament statistics
- Matches played: 31
- Goals scored: 75 (2.42 per match)

The 1971 AFC Youth Championship was held in Tokyo, Japan.

== Teams ==
The following teams entered the tournament:

- Burma
- Hong Kong
- India
- Indonesia
- Iran
- Israel
- Japan (host)
- Kuwait
- Malaysia
- Nepal
- Philippines
- Singapore
- South Korea
- South Vietnam
- Taiwan
- Thailand

== Group stage ==
=== Group A ===
Teams	Pld	W	D	L	GF	GA	GD	Pts
Burma	3	2	1	0	13	1	+12	5
India	3	2	1	0	5	2	+3	5
Philippines	3	1	0	2	1	9	–8	2
Nepal	3	0	0	3	1	8	–7	0

25 April	India	2–0	Philippines
	Burma	5–0	Nepal
27 April	Philippines	0–7	Burma
	India	2–1	Nepal
29 April	Nepal	0–1	Philippines
	Burma	1–1	India

=== Group B ===
Teams	Pld	W	D	L	GF	GA	GD	Pts
Japan	3	3	0	0	10	0	+10	6
Malaysia	3	2	0	1	3	5	–2	4
Taiwan	3	1	0	2	3	6	–3	2
Singapore	3	0	0	3	1	6	–5	0

24 April	Japan	3–0	Taiwan
25 April	Malaysia	1–0	Singapore
27 April	Taiwan	1–2	Malaysia
	Japan	3–0	Singapore
29 April	Singapore	1–2	Taiwan
	Malaysia	0–4	Japan

=== Group C ===
Teams	Pld	W	D	L	GF	GA	GD	Pts
Israel	3	2	1	0	8	1	+7	5
South Korea	3	2	1	0	7	3	+4	5
South Vietnam	3	1	0	2	2	8	–6	2
Hong Kong	3	0	0	3	1	6	–5	0

25 April	Israel	2–0	Hong Kong
	South Korea	3–1	South Vietnam
27 April	Israel	5–0	South Vietnam
	Hong Kong	1–3	South Korea
29 April	South Vietnam	1–0	Hong Kong
	South Korea	1–1	Israel

=== Group D ===
Teams	Pld	W	D	L	GF	GA	GD	Pts
Iran	3	2	1	0	6	0	+6	5
Kuwait	3	2	1	0	2	0	+2	5
Indonesia	3	0	1	2	1	4	–3	1
Thailand	3	0	1	2	1	6	–5	1

25 April	Thailand	0–4	Iran
	Indonesia	0–1	Kuwait
27 April	Iran	0–0	Kuwait
	Indonesia	1–1	Thailand
29 April	Thailand	0–1	Kuwait
	Indonesia	0–2	Iran

== Quarterfinals ==
1 May 1971

Burma	1 – 0	Malaysia

Tokyo
1 May 1971

Japan	3 – 0	India

Tokyo
1 May 1971

Israel	2 – 0 ^{1}	Kuwait

1 May 1971

Iran	1 – 1 (4–5 pen.)	South Korea

Tokyo

^{1} Kuwait refused to play Israel for political reasons; Israel were awarded a 2–0 victory.

== Semifinals ==
3 May 1971

Israel	1 – 0	Burma

Tokyo
3 May 1971

Japan	0 – 0 (3–5 pen.)	South Korea

Tokyo

== Third place match ==
5 May 1971

Burma	2 – 0	Japan

Tokyo

== Final ==
5 May 1971

Israel	1 – 0	South Korea

Tokyo

1971 AFC Youth Championship

Israel
Fifth title
