= 1961 AFC Youth Championship =

Tournament details
- Host country: Thailand
- Dates: 10–20 April
- Teams: 10

Final positions
- Champions: Indonesia; Burma (joint title holders)
- Third place: Thailand
- Fourth place: South Vietnam

Tournament statistics
- Matches played: 22
- Goals scored: 87 (3.95 per match)

The 1961 AFC Youth Championship was held in Bangkok, Thailand. Burma and Indonesia drew in the final and shared the title.

== Teams ==
The following teams entered the tournament:

- Burma
- Ceylon
- Indonesia
- Japan
- Malaya
- Singapore
- South Korea
- Taiwan
- Thailand (host)
- South Vietnam

== Group stage ==
=== Group A ===
| Pos | Team | Pld | W | D | L | GF | GA | GD | Pts | Qualification |
|---|---|---|---|---|---|---|---|---|---|---|
| 1 | Indonesia | 4 | 2 | 2 | 0 | 7 | 4 | +3 | 6 | Advanced to final |
| 2 | South Vietnam | 4 | 2 | 1 | 1 | 10 | 5 | +5 | 5 | Advanced to third place match |
| 3 | South Korea | 4 | 1 | 3 | 0 | 8 | 4 | +4 | 5 | |
| 4 | Singapore | 4 | 1 | 1 | 2 | 2 | 10 | −8 | 3 | |
| 5 | Japan | 4 | 0 | 1 | 3 | 4 | 8 | −4 | 1 | |

Source: AFC

| Japan | 0–1 | Singapore |

Bangkok
11 April 1961

| Indonesia | 2–0 | South Vietnam |
|---|---|---|
| Kuswanadji 15'; Andjiek Alinurdin 25' |

Bangkok

12 April 1961

| Japan | 1–1 | South Korea |
|---|---|---|
| Kenpei Tanaka 63' | | Lee Woo-jin 4' |

Bangkok

| South Vietnam | 5–0 | Singapore |

Bangkok

| Indonesia | 2–2 | South Korea |

Bangkok

| South Vietnam | 4–2 | Japan |

Bangkok

16 April 1961

| South Korea | 4–0 | Singapore |

Bangkok
16 April 1961

| Indonesia | 2–1 | Japan |
|---|---|---|
| Agam 47' 75' | | Tanaka 30' |

Bangkok

18 April 1961

| Singapore | 1–1 | Indonesia |
|---|---|---|
| Quah Kim Siak 30' | | Bob Hippy 73' |

Bangkok
18 April 1961

| South Korea | 1–1 | South Vietnam |

Bangkok

=== Group B ===
| Pos | Team | Pld | W | D | L | GF | GA | GD | Pts | Qualification |
|---|---|---|---|---|---|---|---|---|---|---|
| 1 | Burma | 4 | 3 | 1 | 0 | 13 | 8 | +5 | 7 | Advanced to final |
| 2 | Thailand | 4 | 3 | 0 | 1 | 12 | 5 | +7 | 6 | Advanced to third place match |
| 3 | Malaya | 4 | 2 | 1 | 1 | 15 | 7 | +8 | 5 | |
| 4 | Ceylon | 4 | 1 | 0 | 3 | 9 | 13 | −4 | 2 | |
| 5 | Taiwan | 4 | 0 | 0 | 4 | 4 | 20 | −16 | 0 | |

Source: AFC

| Thailand | 4–1 | Taiwan |

Bangkok

| Malaya | 3–1 | Ceylon |

Bangkok

12 April 1961

| Burma | 3–2 | Taiwan |
|---|---|---|
| Toe Aung 18' 36'; Aye Myint 72' | | Cheung Che Wai 36' 65' |

Bangkok
12 April 1961

| Thailand | 4–1 | Ceylon |
|---|---|---|
| Tawee Pongsiniwong 54'; Yanyong Nanongkhai 65'; Genong Thephasdin 73'; Vichai Chumchindap 80' | | Aluvihare 20' |

Bangkok

| Malaya | 3–3 | Burma |

Bangkok

| Ceylon | 5–1 | Taiwan |

Bangkok

| Burma | 2–1 | Thailand |

Bangkok

| Malaya | 8–0 | Taiwan |

Bangkok

| Burma | 5–2 | Ceylon |

Bangkok

| Thailand | 3–1 | Malaya |

Bangkok

== Third place match ==
| Thailand | 2–1 | South Vietnam |

Bangkok

== Final ==
20 April 1961

| Indonesia | 0–0 (aet) Title shared | Burma |

Bangkok

1961 AFC Youth Championship

Burma
First title

1961 AFC Youth Championship

Indonesia
First title
