= 1969 AFC Youth Championship =

Tournament details
- Host country: Thailand
- Dates: 15–30 April
- Teams: 15

The 1969 AFC Youth Championship was held in Bangkok, Thailand.

== Teams ==
The following teams entered the tournament:

- Burma
- Ceylon
- Hong Kong
- Indonesia
- Iran
- Israel
- Japan
- Laos
- Malaysia
- Philippines
- Singapore
- South Korea
- South Vietnam
- Taiwan
- Thailand (host)

== Group stage ==
=== Group A ===
Teams	Pld	W	D	L	GF	GA	GD	Pts
Thailand	2	2	0	0	12	1	+11	4
Japan	2	1	0	1	4	6	–2	2
Singapore	2	0	0	2	2	11	–9	0

15 April	Japan	1–4	Thailand
18 April	Japan	3–2	Singapore
21 April	Singapore	0–8	Thailand

=== Group B ===
Teams	Pld	W	D	L	GF	GA	GD	Pts
Iran	3	2	1	0	9	2	+7	5
Malaysia	3	1	1	1	4	7	–3	3
Indonesia	3	0	2	1	5	6	–1	2
Ceylon	3	0	2	1	2	5	–3	2

15 April 1969

Sri Lanka	2–2	Indonesia
Cruzz 60' 66'		Waskito 12' 67'

19 April 1969

Iran	3–2	Indonesia
Bahanlu 8' 30'; Hazlumi 60'		Waskito 12' 65'

22 April 1969

Malaysia	1–1	Indonesia
Wan Zawawi 2'		Suparjono 67'

15 April	Ceylon	2–2	Indonesia
16 April	Malaysia	0–6	Iran
18 April	Ceylon	0–3	Malaysia
21 April	Ceylon	0–0	Iran

=== Group C ===
Teams	Pld	W	D	L	GF	GA	GD	Pts
Israel	3	3	0	0	6	0	+6	6
South Korea	3	2	0	1	9	2	+7	4
Laos	3	1	0	2	3	5	–2	2
Philippines	3	0	0	3	1	12	–11	0

16 April	Laos	2–1	Philippines
17 April	Israel	1–0	South Korea
19 April	Laos	0–2	Israel
20 April	Philippines	0–7	South Korea
22 April	Laos	1–2	South Korea
23 April	Philippines	0–3	Israel

=== Group D ===
Teams	Pld	W	D	L	GF	GA	GD	Pts
Burma	3	2	1	0	14	3	+11	5
South Vietnam	3	1	1	1	5	10	–5	3
Taiwan	3	0	2	1	6	7	–1	2
Hong Kong	3	1	0	2	6	11	–5	2

16 April	Hong Kong	2–3	South Vietnam
	Burma	2–2	Taiwan
20 April	Taiwan	1–1	South Vietnam
	Burma	5–0	Hong Kong
22 April	Hong Kong	4–3	Taiwan
23 April	Burma	7–1	South Vietnam

== Quarterfinals ==
25 April 1969

Iran	2 – 0	South Korea

Bangkok
25 April 1969

Thailand	3 – 1	South Vietnam

Bangkok
26 April 1969

Israel	1 – 0	Malaysia

Bangkok
26 April 1969

Burma	5 – 1	Japan

Bangkok

== Semifinals ==
28 April 1969

Burma	1 – 0	Israel

Bangkok
28 April 1969

Iran	0 – 1	Thailand

Bangkok

== Third place match ==
30 April 1969

Iran	2 – 1 (aet)	Israel

Bangkok

== Final ==
30 April 1969

Burma	2 – 2 title shared	Thailand
Tin Aung Moe 76'; Ye Nyunt 80'		Niwat Srisawat 22'; Sahas Pornsawan 85'

Bangkok
Attendance: 34.000

1969 AFC Youth Championship

Burma
Sixth title

1969 AFC Youth Championship

Thailand
Second title
