= 1970 AFC Youth Championship =

Tournament details
- Host country: Philippines
- Dates: 15 April – 2 May
- Teams: 16
- Venue: 1 (in 1 host city)

Final positions
- Champions: Burma
- Runners-up: Indonesia
- Third place: South Korea
- Fourth place: Japan

Tournament statistics
- Matches played: 32
- Goals scored: 103 (3.22 per match)

The 1970 AFC Youth Championship was held in Manila, Philippines.

== Teams ==
The following teams entered the tournament:

- Brunei
- Burma
- Ceylon
- Hong Kong
- Indonesia
- Iran
- Israel
- Japan
- Laos
- Malaysia
- Philippines (host)
- Singapore
- South Vietnam
- South Korea
- Taiwan
- Thailand

Note: India also entered, but withdrew before the draw due to internal dissent.

== Group stage ==
=== Group A ===
Teams	Pld	W	D	L	GF	GA	GD	Pts
Hong Kong	3	3	0	0	9	2	+7	6
South Korea	3	2	0	1	5	2	+3	4
Thailand	3	1	0	2	12	4	+8	2
Brunei	3	0	0	3	1	19	–18	0

15 April 1970

South Korea	2–1	Thailand
Cho Han-hung 27' (pen.) 45+1'		Suchin Kawisat 30' (pen.)

16 April 1970

Hong Kong	6–1	Brunei

18 April 1970

Hong Kong	2–1	Thailand

19 April 1970

South Korea	3–0	Brunei
Lee Hi-sung 5'; Cho Han-hung; Cho Sung-kun

23 April 1970

Thailand	10–0	Brunei
Sudtha Sudsarat; Songthai Sahavacharat; Kajongsuk Vermelaste; Chatchai Paholpat

25 April 1970

Hong Kong	1–0	South Korea

=== Group B ===
Teams	Pld	W	D	L	GF	GA	GD	Pts
Iran	3	3	0	0	15	1	+14	6
Japan	3	2	0	1	5	6	–1	4
Malaysia	3	1	0	2	3	5	–2	2
Ceylon	3	0	0	3	1	12	–11	0

17 April 1970

Iran	8–0	Ceylon
Gholam Mazloumi; Ali Parvin; Mehdi Veisi

17 April 1970

Japan	2–1	Malaysia

20 April 1970

Malaysia	2–0	Ceylon

21 April 1970

Iran	4–1	Japan
Ali Parvin 7'; Hadimana 22'; Mehdi Veisi 36'; V. Musami		Yoshikazu Nagai 3'

24 April 1970

Iran	3–0	Malaysia

24 April 1970

Japan	2–1	Ceylon

=== Group C ===
Teams	Pld	W	D	L	GF	GA	GD	Pts
Israel	3	2	1	0	10	0	+10	5
Laos	3	1	2	0	6	4	+2	4
Philippines	3	1	1	1	4	5	–1	3
Singapore	3	0	0	3	2	13	–11	0

15 April 1970

Philippines	2–2	Laos
? Martinez 86'		? Pengswvanh 85'

17 April 1970

Israel	7–0	Singapore
Saleem Yechiel 36'; Gidi Damti 66' 70'; Itzhak Rogak 67'; Shalom Schwarz 76' 79'; Ben Nathan David 83'

19 April 1970

Philippines	2–0	Singapore
Ben Veloso 51'; Eddie Bunnan 73'

21 April 1970

Laos	0–0	Israel

25 April 1970

Laos	4–2	Singapore

26 April 1970

Philippines	0–3	Israel

=== Group D ===
Teams	Pld	W	D	L	GF	GA	GD	Pts
Indonesia	3	3	0	0	3	0	+3	6
Burma	3	2	0	1	9	1	+8	4
South Vietnam	3	1	0	2	1	7	–6	2
Taiwan	3	0	0	3	0	5	–5	0

16 April 1970

Indonesia	1–0	Burma
Anwar Ramang 55'

18 April 1970

South Vietnam	1–0	Taiwan
Tran Van Nam 21'

19 April 1970

Burma	6–0	South Vietnam

23 April 1970

Indonesia	1–0	Taiwan
Karno Wahid 30'

26 April 1970

Indonesia	1–0	South Vietnam
Budi Santoso 7'

26 April 1970

Burma	3–0	Taiwan

== Knockout stage ==
Quarter-finals
27 April
Hong Kong	0 (4)
Japan	0 (5)
28 April
Israel	0
Burma	1
27 April
Iran	0
South Korea	1
28 April
Indonesia	3
Laos	1

Semi-finals
30 April
Japan	0
Burma	2
30 April
South Korea	0
Indonesia	1

Final
2 May
Burma	3
Indonesia	0
Third Place Match
2 May
South Korea	5
Japan	0

=== Quarter-finals ===
27 April 1970

Iran	0–1	South Korea

Rizal Stadium, Manila
27 April 1970

Hong Kong	0–0 (a.e.t.)	Japan
Penalties
	4–5

Rizal Stadium, Manila
28 April 1970

Israel	0–1	Burma
Topolansky (red card) 57'		Soe Than (red card) 57'; Kyu Myint 72'

Rizal Stadium, Manila
28 April 1970

Indonesia	3–1	Laos
Levi Doom; Lukman Santoso

Rizal Stadium, Manila

=== Semi-finals ===
30 April 1970

South Korea	0–1	Indonesia
		Karno Wahid 79'

Rizal Stadium, Manila
30 April 1970

Japan	0–2	Burma

Rizal Stadium, Manila

== Third place match ==
2 May 1970

South Korea	5–0	Japan
Cho Han-hung 44' 72'; Lee Cha-man 48' 68'; Kim Hak-ki 54'

Rizal Stadium, Manila
Attendance: 23.000

== Final ==
2 May 1970

Indonesia	0–3	Burma
Rachman Halim (red card) 68'; Budi Santoso (red card) 68'		? 24'; Ye Nyunt (red card) 68'; Aye Maung 75'; Nyi Nyunt 78'

Rizal Stadium, Manila
Attendance: 25.000
Referee: Eriberto Cruz (Philippines)

1970 AFC Youth Championship

Burma
Seventh title

== Notes ==
1. The match was abandoned in the 47th minute after Thai player Sahus Pormswarn, who had been sent off, refused to leave the pitch.
