= 1974 AFC Youth Championship =

Tournament details
- Host country: Thailand
- Dates: 14–30 April
- Teams: 16

Final positions
- Champions: India; Iran; (Title shared)
- Third place: South Korea
- Fourth place: Thailand

The 1974 AFC Youth Championship was held in Bangkok, Thailand. India and Iran shared the title after the final ended in a 2–2 Draw. This was also the last tournament South Vietnam participated, one year later on 30 April 1975 South Vietnam was annexed by North Vietnam.

== Group stage ==
=== Group A ===
Pos	Team	Pld	W	D	L	GF	GA	GD	Pts	Qualification
1	Iran	3	3	0	0	10	0	+10	6	Advance to knockout stage.
2	Singapore	3	2	0	1	5	1	+4	4	Advance to knockout stage.
3	South Vietnam	3	1	0	2	1	8	−7	2	
4	Philippines	3	0	0	3	0	7	−7	0	

Source: RSSSF
14 April 1974

Iran	1–0	Singapore
Kamal Khalilian

16 April 1974

South Vietnam	1–0	Philippines

18 April 1974

Iran	5–0	Philippines
Kamal Khalilian; Karim Ghiazi; Hassan Rowshan; Parviz Mazloumi; Mohammad Dastjerdi

20 April 1974

Singapore	1–0	Philippines
Jacob Chacko	Report

20 April 1974

Iran	4–0	South Vietnam
Hassan Rowshan; Parviz Mazloumi; Hadi Naraghi

22 April 1974

Singapore	4–0	South Vietnam
Sharon Rahmat; Ramli Haron; Mohammed Noh; Jacob Chacko	Report

=== Group B ===
Pos	Team	Pld	W	D	L	GF	GA	GD	Pts	Qualification
1	India	3	2	1	0	4	2	+2	5	Advance to knockout stage.
2	Hong Kong	3	0	3	0	3	3	0	3	Advance to knockout stage.
3	Burma	3	1	1	1	2	2	0	3	
4	Laos	3	0	1	2	2	4	−2	1	

Source: RSSSF
15 April 1974

Hong Kong	1–1	Laos

17 April 1974

India	1–0	Laos
Habib Virji	Report

17 April 1974

Hong Kong	0–0	Burma

19 April 1974

India	1–0	Burma
Shabbir Ali

21 April 1974

India	2–2	Hong Kong
Mohammed Yaqoob

21 April 1974

Burma	2–1	Laos

=== Group C ===
Pos	Team	Pld	W	D	L	GF	GA	GD	Pts	Qualification
1	South Korea	3	3	0	0	7	2	+5	6	Advance to knockout stage.
2	Malaysia	3	2	0	1	5	5	0	4	Advance to knockout stage.
3	Khmer Republic	3	1	0	2	7	6	+1	2	
4	Nepal	3	0	0	3	4	10	−6	0	

Source: RSSSF
15 April 1974

Malaysia	2–1	Khmer Republic
Marzuki Ismaun		Sok Sitha

15 April 1974

South Korea	2–1	Nepal

17 April 1974

Khmer Republic	6–2	Nepal
Taing You Khan; Hun Chanky		Ruk Bahadur; Rupak Sharma

19 April 1974

South Korea	2–0	Khmer Republic
Yoo Dong-Choon; Park Min-Jae

19 April 1974

Malaysia	2–1	Nepal
Mohammed Alif; Niraj Pun	Report	Prashad Pradhan

21 April 1974

South Korea	3–1	Malaysia

=== Group D ===
Pos	Team	Pld	W	D	L	GF	GA	GD	Pts	Qualification
1	Thailand	3	3	0	0	11	0	+11	6	Advance to knockout stage.
2	Japan	3	2	0	1	8	2	+6	4	Advance to knockout stage.
3	Taiwan	3	1	0	2	3	4	−1	2	
4	Brunei	3	0	0	3	1	17	−16	0	

Source: RSSSF
14 April 1974

Thailand	7–0	Brunei
Mantapol; Chaiwatana Soontornkoon; Nat Thamrongvej; Manas Rattanatisoi; Razak Tahir (o.g.); Danai Mongkolsiri

16 April 1974

Japan	1–0	Taiwan
Yuichi Kotaki	Report

18 April 1974

Thailand	3–0	Taiwan
Cherdsak Chaiyabutr; Chaiwatana Soontornkoon	Report

20 April 1974

Japan	7–1	Brunei
Yuichi Kotaki; K.Kawachi		Damit

22 April 1974

Thailand	1–0	Japan
Nat Thamrongvej

22 April 1974

Taiwan	3–0	Brunei

== Knockout stage ==
Quarter-finals
24 April
India	1 (4)
Singapore	1 (1)
25 April
Thailand	2
Malaysia	0
24 April
Iran	3
Hong Kong	0
25 April
South Korea	2
Japan	1

Semi-finals
28 April
India	2
Thailand	1
28 April
Iran	3
South Korea	0

Final
30 April
India	2
Iran	2
Third place
30 April
Thailand	1
South Korea	2

=== Quarter-finals ===
24 April 1974

India	1–1	Singapore
Shabbir Ali		Jacob Chacko
Penalties
	4–1

24 April 1974

Iran	3–0	Hong Kong
Hassan Rowshan; Ma Tin-Hung (o.g.)

25 April 1974

South Korea	2–1	Japan

25 April 1974

Thailand	2–0	Malaysia

=== Semi-finals ===
28 April 1974

Iran	3–0	South Korea

28 April 1974

Thailand	1–2	India
		Shabbir Ali; Mohammad Yaqoob

=== Third place playoff ===
30 April 1974

Thailand	1–2	South Korea
Nat Thamrongvej		Huh Jung-Moo; Park Byung-Chul

=== Final ===
30 April 1974

India	2–2 Joint Champions	Iran
S. Latifuddin; Shabbir Ali	AIFF; Report	Mohammad Dastjerdi; Karim Ghiazi

Attendance: 15,000

== Champion ==
1974 AFC Youth Championship

India
First title

1974 AFC Youth Championship

Iran
Second title
