= 1962 AFC Youth Championship =

Tournament details
- Host country: Thailand
- Dates: 14–26 April
- Teams: 10

Final positions
- Champions: Thailand (1st title)
- Runners-up: South Korea
- Third place: Indonesia
- Fourth place: Malaya

The 1962 AFC Youth Championship was held in Bangkok, Thailand.

== Teams ==
The following teams entered the tournament:

- Burma
- Hong Kong
- Indonesia
- Japan
- Malaya
- Pakistan
- Singapore
- South Korea
- Thailand (host)
- South Vietnam

== Group stage ==
=== Group A ===
Teams	Pld	W	D	L	GF	GA	GD	Pts
Thailand	4	2	2	0	5	2	+3	6
Malaya	4	2	2	0	11	3	+8	6
South Vietnam	4	1	2	1	6	5	+1	4
Japan	4	1	0	3	4	9	–5	2
Burma	4	1	0	3	1	8	–7	2

14 April	Japan	0–2	Thailand
15 April	Malaya	2–2	South Vietnam
16 April	Burma	0–1	Thailand
17 April	Japan	0–4	Malaya
18 April	Burma	1–0	South Vietnam
19 April	Malaya	1–1	Thailand
20 April	Burma	0–3	Japan
21 April	South Vietnam	1–1	Thailand
22 April	Burma	0–4	Malaya
23 April	Japan	1–3	South Vietnam

==== First-place play-off ====
24 April 1962

Thailand	3 – 0	Malaya

Bangkok

=== Group B ===
Teams	Pld	W	D	L	GF	GA	GD	Pts
South Korea	4	3	1	0	13	0	+13	7
Indonesia	4	2	1	1	6	4	+2	5
Pakistan	4	2	0	2	9	8	+1	4
Hong Kong	4	2	0	2	7	8	–1	4
Singapore	4	0	0	4	1	16	–15	0

14 April	Hong Kong	0–4	South Korea
15 April	Indonesia	4–1	Singapore
16 April	Hong Kong	4–2	Pakistan
17 April	Indonesia	0–0	South Korea
18 April	Pakistan	4–0	Singapore
19 April	Hong Kong	0–2	Indonesia
20 April	South Korea	5–0	Singapore
21 April	Indonesia	0–3	Pakistan
22 April	Hong Kong	3–0	Singapore
23 April	South Korea	4–0	Pakistan

== Third place match ==
26 April 1962

Indonesia	3 – 0	Malaya

Bangkok

== Final ==
26 April 1962

Thailand	2 – 1	South Korea

Bangkok

1962 AFC Youth Championship

Thailand
First title
