= 1963 AFC Youth Championship =

Tournament details
- Host country: Malaya
- Dates: 18–28 April
- Teams: 12

The 1963 AFC Youth Championship was held in the Federation of Malaya.

== Teams ==
The following teams entered the tournament:

- Burma
- Cambodia
- Ceylon
- Hong Kong
- India
- Japan
- Malaya (host)
- Philippines
- Singapore
- South Korea
- Thailand
- South Vietnam

== Group stage ==
=== Group A ===
Teams	Pld	W	D	L	GF	GA	GD	Pts
Burma	5	4	1	0	15	3	+12	9
Thailand	5	3	0	2	13	6	+7	6
Malaya	5	3	0	2	10	6	+4	6
India	5	2	1	2	6	5	+1	5
Cambodia	5	2	0	3	7	12	–5	4
Philippines	5	0	0	5	3	22	–19	0

18 April	Malaya	5–1	Philippines
19 April	Thailand	4–0	Cambodia
	India	1–1	Burma
20 April	Malaya	2–1	India
	Burma	4–0	Philippines
21 April	Philippines	0–5	Thailand
	Malaya	0–1	Cambodia
23 April	Malaya	1–2	Burma
	Thailand	2–0	India
24 April	Cambodia	6–2	Philippines
25 April	India	2–0	Cambodia
	Burma	4–1	Thailand
26 April	Philippines	0–2	India
	Malaya	2–1	Thailand
27 April	Burma	4–0	Cambodia

=== Group B ===
Teams	Pld	W	D	L	GF	GA	GD	Pts
South Korea	5	4	1	0	14	4	+10	9
Hong Kong	5	4	0	1	15	4	+11	8
South Vietnam	5	2	2	1	10	7	+3	6
Singapore	5	2	0	3	10	14	–4	4
Japan	5	1	1	3	8	13	–5	3
Ceylon	5	0	0	5	3	18	–15	0

18 April	Singapore	4–1	Ceylon
19 April	Japan	1–4	South Korea
	South Vietnam	0–2	Hong Kong
20 April	Hong Kong	5–0	Ceylon
	Singapore	1–3	South Korea
21 April	Singapore	2–3	South Vietnam
	Ceylon	1–2	Japan
23 April	South Korea	3–0	Hong Kong
24 April	South Vietnam	4–0	Ceylon
	Japan	2–3	Singapore
25 April	South Korea	1–1	South Vietnam
	Hong Kong	3–1	Japan
26 April	Ceylon	1–3	South Korea
	Hong Kong	5–0	Singapore
27 April	Japan	2–2	South Vietnam

== Third place match ==
28 April 1963

Thailand	2 – 2 Third place shared	Hong Kong

== Final ==
28 April 1963

Burma	2 – 2 Title shared	South Korea

1963 AFC Youth Championship

South Korea
Third title

1963 AFC Youth Championship

Burma
Second title
