= 1964 AFC Youth Championship =

Tournament details
- Host country: South Vietnam
- Dates: 18–28 April
- Teams: 8
- Venue: 1 (in 1 host city)

Tournament statistics
- Matches played: 14
- Goals scored: 38 (2.71 per match)

The 1964 AFC Youth Championship was held in Saigon, South Vietnam.

== Teams ==
The following teams entered the tournament:

- Burma
- India
- Israel
- Japan
- Malaysia
- South Korea
- Thailand
- South Vietnam (host)

== Group stage ==
=== Group A ===
Team	Pld	W	D	L	GF	GA	GD	Pts
Israel	3	3	0	0	10	0	+10	6
South Korea	3	2	0	1	3	4	−1	4
Japan	3	0	1	2	1	4	−3	1
Thailand	3	0	1	2	1	7	−6	1

Source: AFC

Results:

19 April	South Korea	1–0	Japan
	Israel	4–0	Thailand
23 April	Japan	1–1	Thailand
	Israel	4–0	South Korea
26 April	South Korea	2–0	Thailand
	Israel	2–0	Japan

=== Group B ===
Pos	Team	Pld	W	D	L	GF	GA	GD	Pts
1	Burma	3	2	0	1	8	3	+5	4
2	Malaysia	3	1	1	1	6	6	0	3
3	South Vietnam	3	1	1	1	1	3	−2	3
4	India	3	0	2	1	1	4	−3	2

Source: AFC

Results:

18 April	South Vietnam	0–3	Malaysia
	Burma	3–0	India
22 April	Burma	5–2	Malaysia
	South Vietnam	0–0	India
25 April	India	1–1	Malaysia
	South Vietnam	1–0	Burma

== Third place match ==
28 April 1964

Malaysia	5–1	South Korea
Looi Loon Teik; S.Karathu; Dali Omar		Cheung Dong-Soo

Cộng Hòa Stadium

== Final ==
28 April 1964

Burma	0–0 Title shared	Israel

Cộng Hòa Stadium
Attendance: 40,000

1964 AFC Youth Championship

Burma
Third title

1964 AFC Youth Championship

Israel
First title
