= 1967 AFC Youth Championship =

Tournament details
- Host country: Thailand
- Dates: 15–27 April
- Teams: 14

Final positions
- Champions: Israel (4th title)
- Runners-up: Indonesia
- Third place: Burma
- Fourth place: Singapore

The 1967 AFC Youth Championship was held in Bangkok, Thailand.

== Teams ==
The following teams entered the tournament:

- Burma
- Ceylon
- Hong Kong
- India
- Indonesia
- Israel
- Japan
- Malaysia
- Philippines
- Singapore
- South Korea
- South Vietnam
- Taiwan
- Thailand (host)

== Group stage ==
=== Group A ===
Teams	Pld	W	D	L	GF	GA	GD	Pts
Thailand	2	2	0	0	12	0	+12	4
Ceylon	2	1	0	1	3	7	–4	2
Philippines	2	0	0	2	2	10	–8	0

15 April	Thailand	7–0	Philippines
17 April	Ceylon	3–2	Philippines
20 April	Thailand	5–0	Ceylon

=== Group B ===
Teams	Pld	W	D	L	GF	GA	GD	Pts
Indonesia	3	2	1	0	8	3	+5	5
South Vietnam	3	1	2	0	3	2	+1	4
South Korea	3	1	1	1	8	7	+1	3
Hong Kong	3	0	0	3	5	12	–7	0

15 April 1967

South Korea	1–1	South Vietnam

16 April 1967

Indonesia	4–2	Hong Kong
Abdul Kadir 2'; Waskito 50' 59'; Gede Rai 70'		Ip Sheung Wah 57'; Wai Hong 62' (pen.)

18 April 1967

South Vietnam	1–0	Hong Kong

18 April 1967

Indonesia	3–0	South Korea
Abdul Kadir 20'; Waskito 24' 53'

Suphachalasai Stadium
20 April 1967

South Korea	7–3	Hong Kong

21 April 1967

Indonesia	1–1	South Vietnam

=== Group C ===
Teams	Pld	W	D	L	GF	GA	GD	Pts
Burma	3	3	0	0	5	0	+5	6
Singapore	3	2	0	1	5	3	+2	4
Taiwan	3	1	0	2	4	7	–3	2
Japan	3	0	0	3	2	6	–4	0

16 April 1967

Burma	1–0	Japan
Han Thein 23'

16 April 1967

Singapore	3–1	Taiwan
Vernon Lim 44'; Ow Siew Kong 57'; Kadir Sulaiman 88'		Lee Mui-lam 17'

Attendance: 10.000
18 April 1967

Taiwan	3–2	Japan

19 April 1967

Burma	3–1	Singapore

22 April 1967

Singapore	2–0	Japan

22 April 1967

Burma	2–0	Taiwan

=== Group D ===
Teams	Pld	W	D	L	GF	GA	GD	Pts
Israel	2	1	1	0	7	1	+6	3
India	2	1	1	0	5	2	+3	3
Malaysia	2	0	0	2	1	10	–9	0

17 April	India	1–1	Israel
19 April	Israel	6–0	Malaysia
21 April	India	4–1	Malaysia

== Quarterfinals ==
23 April 1967

Thailand	0 – 1	Singapore

Bangkok
23 April 1967

Israel	3 – 0	South Vietnam

Bangkok
24 April 1967

Burma	5 – 0	Ceylon

Bangkok
24 April 1967

Indonesia	6 – 2	India
Tjan Peng Hong 20'; Abdul Kadir 46' (pen.) 52'; Mochtar 48'; Waskito 68'		Kanaan 12'; Mohammed Habib 28'

Bangkok

== Semifinals ==
25 April 1967

Indonesia	3 – 0	Singapore
Tjan Peng Hong 40' 52'; Djunaedi Abdillah 60'

Bangkok
25 April 1967

Israel	1 – 0	Burma

Bangkok

== Third place match ==
27 April 1967

Burma	4 – 0	Singapore

Bangkok

== Final ==
27 April 1967

Israel	3 – 0	Indonesia

Bangkok

1967 AFC Youth Championship

Israel
Fourth title
