= 1965 AFC Youth Championship =

1965 AFC U-19 Championship
Tournament details
- Host country: Japan
- Dates: 24 April – 5 May
- Teams: 10 (from 1 confederation)
- Venue: (in 1 host city)

Final positions
- Champions: Israel (2nd title)
- Runners-up: Burma
- Third place: Malaysia
- Fourth place: Hong Kong

Tournament statistics
- Matches played: 24
- Goals scored: 86 (3.58 per match)

The 1965 AFC Youth Championship was held in Tokyo, Japan. Israel defeated Burma to clinch the title.

== Participants ==
- Burma
- Hong Kong
- India
- Israel
- Japan
- Malaysia
- Philippines
- South Korea
- South Vietnam
- Thailand

== Tournament ==
=== Group stage ===
==== Group A ====
Team	Pld	W	D	L	GF	GA	GD	Pts
Israel	4	4	0	0	18	4	+14	8
Hong Kong	4	3	0	1	7	4	+3	6
Japan	4	2	0	2	8	4	+4	4
South Vietnam	4	1	0	3	9	8	+1	2
Philippines	4	0	0	4	2	24	–22	0

April 24, 1965

Japan	5 – 0	Philippines

Tokyo

April 25, 1965

Israel	5 – 1	South Vietnam

Tokyo

April 26, 1965

Hong Kong	1 – 0	Japan

Tokyo
April 26, 1965

Israel	8 – 1	Philippines

Tokyo

April 28, 1965

South Vietnam	7 – 0	Philippines

Tokyo
April 28, 1965

Israel	3 – 1	Hong Kong

Tokyo

April 29, 1965

Japan	1 – 2	Israel

Tokyo
April 29, 1965

Hong Kong	1 – 0	South Vietnam

Tokyo

May 1, 1965

Hong Kong	4 – 1	Philippines

Tokyo
May 1, 1965

Japan	2 – 1	South Vietnam

Tokyo

==== Group B ====
Team	Pld	W	D	L	GF	GA	GD	Pts
Burma	4	4	0	0	11	1	+14	8
Malaysia	4	2	0	2	2	6	–4	4
Thailand	4	1	1	2	1	3	–2	3
India	4	1	1	2	3	6	–3	3
South Korea	4	1	0	3	4	5	–1	2

April 25, 1965

Thailand	1 – 0	South Korea

Tokyo
April 25, 1965

Burma	2 – 1	India

Tokyo

April 26, 1965

Thailand	0 – 0	India

Tokyo
April 26, 1965

Burma	5 – 0	Malaysia

Tokyo

April 28, 1965

Burma	2 – 0	South Korea

Tokyo
April 28, 1965

India	1 – 0	Malaysia

Tokyo

April 29, 1965

South Korea	4 – 1	India

Tokyo
April 29, 1965

Malaysia	1 – 0	Thailand

Tokyo

May 1, 1965

Malaysia	1 – 0	South Korea

Tokyo
May 1, 1965

Burma	2 – 0	Thailand

Tokyo

=== Knockout stages ===
Semi-finals
May 3 – Tokyo
Israel	9
Malaysia	0
May 3 – Tokyo
Burma	2
Hong Kong	0

Final
May 5 – Tokyo
Israel	5
Burma	0
Third place
May 5 – Tokyo
Hong Kong	1
Malaysia	4

==== Semi-finals ====
May 3, 1965

Israel	9 – 0	Malaysia

Tokyo

May 3, 1965

Burma	2 – 0	Hong Kong

Tokyo

==== Third place play-off ====
May 5, 1965

Hong Kong	1 – 4	Malaysia

Tokyo

==== Finals ====
May 5, 1965

Israel	5 – 0	Burma

Tokyo

== Winners ==
AFC Youth Championship 1965 winners

Israel
Second title
