= 1990 AFC Youth Championship qualification =

International football competition

Qualification for the 1990 AFC Youth Championship. The main sources for information are RSSSF.com and FIFA Technical Report 1991 (see external links). In cases where the two sources disagree, FIFA's report is documented here.

Indonesia qualified as hosts.

== Groups ==
Winners of each group qualified for the final tournament.

=== Group 1 ===
Matches were played in Taif, Saudi Arabia.

Pos	Team	Pld	W	D	L	GF	GA	GD	Pts	Qualification
1	Bahrain	2	1	1	0	3	2	+1	3	Final tournament
2	Saudi Arabia	2	1	1	0	2	1	+1	3	
3	Oman	2	0	0	2	1	3	−2	0	

August 3, 1990

Bahrain	2–1	Oman

August 5, 1990

Saudi Arabia	1–1	Bahrain

August 7, 1990

Saudi Arabia	1–0	Oman

=== Group 2 ===
The group consisted of Kuwait and Qatar. Kuwait withdrew due to the Gulf War, so Qatar qualified automatically.

=== Group 3 ===
Matches were played in Aleppo, Syria.

Pos	Team	Pld	W	D	L	GF	GA	GD	Pts	Qualification
1	Syria	2	1	1	0	2	1	+1	3	Final tournament
2	Yemen	2	1	0	1	1	1	0	2	
3	Iran	2	0	1	1	1	2	−1	1	

March 9, 1990

Syria	1–0	Yemen

March 11, 1990

Iran	0–1	Yemen

March 13, 1990

Syria	1–1	Iran

=== Group 4 ===
Matches were played in Calicut, India.

Pos	Team	Pld	W	D	L	GF	GA	GD	Pts	Qualification
1	India	3	2	1	0	7	1	+6	5	Final tournament
2	Nepal	3	2	1	0	2	0	+2	5	
3	Maldives	3	1	0	2	2	3	−1	2	
4	Sri Lanka	3	0	0	3	0	7	−7	0	

May 17, 1990

Nepal	1–0	Maldives

May 18, 1990

India	5–0	Sri Lanka

May 20, 1990

India	2–1	Maldives

May 21, 1990

Sri Lanka	0–1	Nepal

May 23, 1990

Sri Lanka	0–1	Maldives

May 25, 1990

India	0–0	Nepal

=== Group 5 ===
Matches were played in Dhaka, Bangladesh.

Pos	Team	Pld	W	D	L	GF	GA	GD	Pts	Qualification
1	South Korea	4	3	1	0	11	1	+10	7	Final tournament
2	Thailand	4	3	0	1	11	5	+6	6	
3	Bangladesh	4	1	2	1	5	3	+2	4	
4	Malaysia	4	1	1	2	4	7	−3	3	
5	Pakistan	4	0	0	4	2	17	−15	0	

May 25, 1990

Bangladesh	0–1	Thailand

May 25, 1990

South Korea	3–0	Malaysia

May 27, 1990

Bangladesh	0–0	Malaysia

May 27, 1990

Pakistan	0–4	South Korea

May 29, 1990

South Korea	3–0	Thailand

May 29, 1990

Malaysia	3–0	Pakistan

May 31, 1990

Bangladesh	1–1	South Korea

May 31, 1990

Thailand	6–1	Pakistan

June 2, 1990

Bangladesh	4–1	Pakistan

June 2, 1990

Thailand	4–1	Malaysia

=== Group 6 ===
Matches were played in Kunming, China.

Pos	Team	Pld	W	D	L	GF	GA	GD	Pts	Qualification
1	North Korea	3	2	1	0	22	2	+20	5	Final tournament
2	China	3	2	1	0	20	1	+19	5	
3	Hong Kong	3	1	0	2	11	11	0	2	
4	Macau	3	0	0	3	0	39	−39	0	

April 22, 1990

North Korea	3–1	Hong Kong

April 22, 1990

China	11–0	Macau

April 24, 1990

China	1–1	North Korea

April 24, 1990

Hong Kong	10–0	Macau

April 26, 1990

North Korea	18–0	Macau

April 26, 1990

China	8–0	Hong Kong

=== Group 7 ===
April 30, 1990

Japan	2–0	Chinese Taipei

Kochi, Japan
May 3, 1990

Chinese Taipei	1–6	Japan

Kochi, Japan

Japan qualified for the final tournament.
