= India national under-20 football team =

Men's under-20 national association football team representing India

India U-20
- Nickname: The Blue Colts
- Association: All India Football Federation
- Confederation: AFC (Asia)
- Sub-confederation: SAFF (South Asia)
- Head coach: Mahesh Gawli
- Captain: Sumit Sharma Brahmacharimayum
- FIFA code: IND
First colours	Second colours

First international
- Myanmar 1–1 India (Malaya; 19 April 1963)

Biggest win
- India 8–0 Nepal (Bhubaneshwar, India; 31 July 2022); India 8–0 Sri Lanka (Yupia, India; 9 May 2025)

Biggest defeat
- India 0–7 Israel (Bangkok, Thailand; 16 April 1972); India 0–7 South Korea (Qatar; 25 October 2002); India 0–7 United Arab Emirates (Qatar; 4 October 2015)

Asian Cup
- Appearances: 23 (first in 1963)
- Best result: Champions (1974)

SAFF Championship
- Appearances: 7 (first in 2015)
- Best result: Champions (2019, 2022, 2023, 2025)
Medal record
Asian Cup
Gold medal – first place	1974 Thailand
OFC Youth Development Tournament
Gold medal – first place	2019 Vanuatu
SAFF Championship
Gold medal – first place	2025 India
Gold medal – first place	2023 Nepal
Gold medal – first place	2019 Nepal
Gold medal – first place	2022 India
Silver medal – second place	2015 Nepal
Silver medal – second place	2026 Maldives
Bronze medal – third place	2017 Bhutan

The India national under-20 football team represents India at all international under-20 tournaments. They act as the main feeder team for the India U-23 and the senior Indian football team.

This team is for Indian players aged under 19 at the start of the calendar year in which a two-year AFC U-19 Championship campaign begins, and as such, some players can remain with the squad until the age of 21. The team competes for the Asian Championship, with the finals every even-numbered year, formerly odd-numbered years. It is also eligible to participate in the SAFF U-20 Championship and the FIFA U-20 World Cup held every two years.

Beginning from 2024–25 I-league season, the team is also eligible to participate in the I-league, the second division of Indian Football League System. Previously, the team has participated in the I-league, then the first and now second division of Indian football league system, since 2010 under the names of AIFF XI, Pailan Arrows and Indian Arrows. The team was disbanded in 2021 and revived as India U-20 in 2024.

== History ==
=== 1959−1970 ===
For the first four seasons of AFC U-19 Championship, from 1959 to 1962 the Indian team did not enter into the tournament though there was no qualification round. India first participated in the AFC U-19 Championships in 1963 but did not move ahead from the group stage. In 1964, the first Kabui player, Basanta Kumar Kabui represented Manipur in an International event.

The first notable result came at the 1966 edition where the team entered the quarter finals with 3 wins against Burma, Japan and Singapore and a defeat by China but in the quarter final they lost to Israel by 4−0. In the next edition at 1967 AFC Youth Championship, India again reached the quarter final, with a 1−1 draw against Israel and by defeating Malaysia 4−1. But in the quarter final, India lost 2−6 to Indonesia. In 1968, the team didn't move beyond group stage, and in the next two editions of 1969 and 1970, India did not enter the championships.

=== 1971−1979 ===
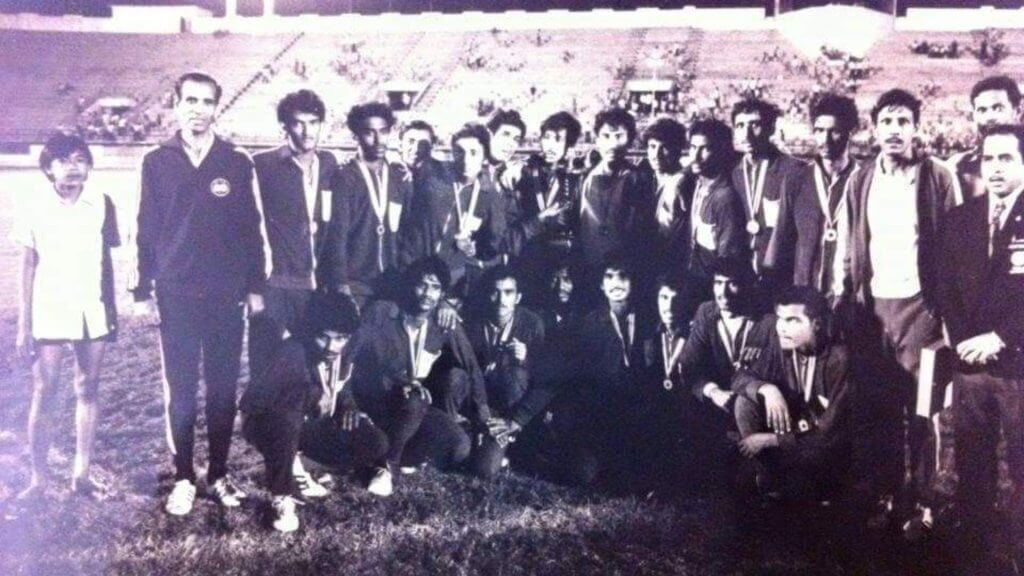
India team, the Asian Youth Champion, in Bangkok on 30 April 1974.

In 1971, they again reached the quarter final for the third time in AFC championships, but the fate was same as again saw a defeat, now against Japan by 0−3. But, after a gap of two more edition, it was 1974 AFC Youth Championship, where India saw the golden moment after becoming the champions of Asia. First in group stage India defeated both Laos and Burma by 1−0 and a draw against Hong Kong by 2−2. Then entering in the quarter final they defeated Singapore in a penalty shootout and reached semi-finals where defeating Thailand by 2−1, for the first time India reached the final of the championship. But the final was a 2−2 draw against Iran, with both teams being declared the champions. In 1975 and 1976 edition, India didn't do much well but at 1977 AFC Youth Championship they reached the quarter final but the opponent was Iran, the defending champion who defeated India by 3−0, thus failed to qualify for the first FIFA World Youth Championship in 1977 which later came to be known as FIFA U-20 World Cup and also failed to qualify at the 1979 edition.

=== 1980−2000, the decline ===
These two decades saw a decline in the performance of the Indian team. A qualification round was introduced at the 1980 AFC Youth Championship. India failed to qualify in 6 out of 11 editions of the championships and in the other 5 editions, they failed to move beyond the group stage, thus also failing to qualify for the FIFA U-20 World Cup, as the finalists were only to be qualified for the competition.

=== 2002−2017, rise and fall ===
In the 2002, at the AFC U-19 Championship, India reached the quarter final for the 6th time, by virtue of being third-place qualifiers, but was heavily defeated by South Korea, where the Korean scored 7 goals. Next two editions they ended their competition in group stages and next 7 editions from 2008 to 2018, India failed to qualify again for the championships and so for the FIFA U20 Worldcup.

In the meanwhile, SAFF started SAFF U-20 Championship from 2015 to develop the youth teams of South Asian countries as they continuously failed to qualify for AFC U-20 championships. In the 2015 inaugural edition, India became runners-up facing a defeat from Nepal through a penalty shoot out. In the next edition in 2017, the tournament was a round robin, where India saw two wins against Bhutan and Maldives and two defeats from Bangladesh and Nepal, achieving the third place in the tournament.

=== 2018−present ===
The AIFF finally acted with the international exposure to the youth and under 17 teams. India's U-20 team was invited to participate in the Cotif Tournament, where clubs and national and autonomous teams participate every year since 1984, held at Valencia, Spain. 2018 Cotif was 35th Anniversary of the tournament. Though India lost two consecutive matches against Spanish club Murcia then against Mauritania, they managed a 0–0 draw against a stronger Latin American side of Venezuela, but on the final group match on 5 August 2018, the Indian side wrote a piece of history when they defeated the most successful U-20 Worldcup winning nation Argentina. The match was historic in many ways, when Indian defender Deepak Tangri headed a corner kick into the net of the Argentinian side, it was the first goal against them by any Indian side, then with a second goal by Anwar Ali with a fabulous free kick helped India to win the match with a score of 2−1 against the stronger Argentine side, made history as it is the first time that any Indian team defeated any Argentina side or any South American national team. Argentina national team manager Scaloni and Argentine great Pablo Aimar praised the young colts performances and said the future of the team was bright if there is continued perseverance. AIFF called it as one of the "biggest days for Indian Football".

Just after the Cotif experience, AIFF announced the team was invited to play in a four-nation tournament between the under-20 national teams of France, Croatia and Slovenia and two friendlies against Serbia. This was the first time India was playing in a 4-nations tournament in which all the opponents are European nations. In the first match the team faced a big defeat against a mightier Croatian team by 0−5. The second match was against Slovenia, where they played very well within 90 minutes but failed to convert various chances and on the last minute of injury time the Slovenian side found the net, match ended in 0−1 defeat. Third match was against France, which India lost by 2−0. In the friendlies against Serbia India saw defeat in both the matches, first by 2−0 and second by 3−1 where Rahim Ali managed to find the net once.

At the South Asian level India won their first U-20 SAFF title in 2019. They defeated Bangladesh 2–1 in the final. Team India also won the inaugural OFC Youth Development Tournament in 2019, after beating Tahiti 2–0. India defended their SAFF title in 2022 by defeating Bangladesh again in the final, this time by an even bigger score of 5–2. It was also in the same tournament that the team recorded their biggest ever victory when they dismantled Nepal 8–0. India won their third title in a row by defeating arch-rivals Pakistan in the final of the SAFF championship in 2023 by a margin of 3–0.

In 2024, India faced Bhutan and Maldives in SAFF U-20 Championship in Nepal. They won their two group games by 1 goal each against Bhutan and Maldives but got drubbed by Bangladesh in the semi-finals during penalty-shootouts. India once again failed to qualify for 2025 AFC U-20 Asian Cup in China. The team won 4–1 over Mongolia and 2–0 over Laos but fell to Iran by 0–1 in the qualifiers.

India participated in 2025 U-20 Challenge Series in Indonesia, with Syria, Jordan and hosts Indonesia. The team lost all their matches with scoring only one goal against Syria. After the tournament former Bengaluru FC and India Under-17 coach Bibiano Fernandes was called to lead the team. India had a dominant run in 2025 SAFF Under-19 Championship, beating Sri Lanka and Nepal by the score of 8–0 and 4–0 respectively. India then defeated Maldives by 3–0 in the semi-finals. The team faced Bangladesh in the final and beat them at penalty-shootouts after the game ended 1–1 in regular time. India has qualified for the 2027 AFC U-20 Asian Cup after 20 years of hiatus since the last time they played in 2006 edition as hosts.

== Results and fixtures ==
For past match results of the under-20 team, see the results in Indian football seasons.

Matches in the last 12 months, and future scheduled matches

Legend

Win Draw Loss Fixture

=== 2026 ===
26 March 2026 2026 SAFF U-20 GS	India	3–0	Pakistan	Malé, Maldives
16:15 IST	V. Yadav 3'; Dodum 64', 88' (pen.)	Report		Stadium: National Football Stadium; Attendance: 334; Referee: Virendha Rai (Bhutan)

28 March 2026 2026 SAFF U-20 GS	Bangladesh	1–1	India	Malé, Maldives
16:15 IST	Riyad 45+10'	Report	V. Yadav 17'	Stadium: National Football Stadium; Attendance: 3,932; Referee: Raeef Rauf (Maldives)

1 April 2026 2026 SAFF U-20 SF	India	5–0	Bhutan	Malé, Maldives
21:00 IST	Dodum 4'; Arbash 44'; Chaphamayum 56', 57'; Thokchom 90+2'	Report		Stadium: National Football Stadium; Attendance: 726; Referee: Mohamed Rideewita Withana Chirantha (Sri Lanka)

3 April 2026 2026 SAFF U-20 F	Bangladesh	0–0 (4–3 p)	India	Malé, Maldives
21:00 IST		Report		Stadium: National Football Stadium; Attendance: 4,100; Referee: Umesh Bidari (Nepal)
	Penalties
	Murshed (penalty scored); Chandon (penalty scored); Fahim (penalty scored); Raksam (penalty missed); R. Sullivan (penalty scored)		(penalty missed) Rishi; (penalty scored) Arbash; (penalty scored) Samson; (penalty scored) Vishal; (penalty missed) Dodum

3 August 2026 Closed Door	India	3–0	Singapore	Bengaluru, India
		Report		Stadium: Centre For Sports Excellence

6 August 2026 Closed Door	India	1–0	Singapore	Bengaluru, India
		Report		Stadium: Centre For Sports Excellence

20 August 2026 Friendly	India	0–0	Yemen	Bengaluru, India
		Report		Stadium: Centre for Sports Excellence

23 August 2026 Friendly	India	1–0	Yemen	Bengaluru, India
		Report		Stadium: Centre for Sports Excellence

31 August 2026 2027 AFC U20 Qualifiers	Syria	0–1	India	Tashkent, Uzbekistan
16:30 IST		Report	Singamayum 86'	Stadium: Do'stlik Stadium; Referee: Du Jianxin (China)

3 September 2026 2027 AFC U20 Qualifiers	India	0–4	Uzbekistan	Tashkent, Uzbekistan
19:30 IST		Report	Maratov 29'; Abraev 34'; Shorakhmedov 67'; Sersenbaev 90'	Stadium: Do'stlik Stadium; Referee: Morteza Mansourian (Iran)

6 September 2026 2027 AFC U20 Qualifiers	India	3–0	Bangladesh	Tashkent, Uzbekistan
16:30 IST	Laishram 25'; Yadav 60'; Arbash 79'	Report		Stadium: Do'stlik Stadium; Referee: Yudi Nurcahya (Indonesia)

2027 AFC U-20 Asian Cup	India	v	To be determined

2027 AFC U-20 Asian Cup	India	v	To be determined

2027 AFC U-20 Asian Cup	India	v	To be determined

== Current staff ==
Position	Name
Head coach	(India) Mahesh Gawli
Assistant coach	(India) Mileswamy Govindaraju; Ramachandran
Goalkeeper coach	(India) Parshuram Salwadi
Strength and conditioning coach	(India) Anugrah Suresh
Team analyst	(India) Prajval V Chakravarthy
Physiotherapist	(India) Syed Shameer Mukhtar
Doctor	(India) Shervin Sheriff
Masseur	(India) Deepak Ravi
Media Officer	(India) Akhil Rawat
Team Manager	(India) Nikhil Shetty

== Players ==
=== Current squad ===
The following 23 players were called up for the friendlies against 2027 AFC U-20 Asian Cup Qualifiers.

Caps and goals are correct as of 6 September 2026, after the match against Bangladesh.

No.	Pos.	Player	Date of birth (age)	Caps	Goals	Club
	GK	Suraj Singh Aheibam	18 February 2008 (age 18)	12	0	(All India Football Federation) Bengaluru
	GK	Jaskaran Dub	25 May 2007 (age 19)	0	0	(All India Football Federation) Punjab
	GK	Pranav Sundarraman	21 January 2007 (age 19)	0	0	(All India Football Federation) Kerala Blasters
	DF	Bungson Singh Takhellambam	5 March 2007 (age 19)	6	0	(All India Football Federation) Bengaluru
	DF	Malemngamba Singh Thokchom	15 October 2007 (age 19)	19	1	(All India Football Federation) Kerala Blasters
	DF	Sumit Sharma Brahmacharimayum (captain)	5 March 2007 (age 19)	10	0	(All India Football Federation) Kerala Blasters
	DF	Yaipharemba Chingakham	6 February 2008 (age 18)	9	0	(All India Football Federation) Bengaluru
	DF	Asher Rebello	11 April 2008 (age 18)	0	0	(All India Football Federation) Goa
	DF	Karish Soram	8 February 2008 (age 18)	1	0	(All India Football Federation) Punjab
	MF	Danny Meitei Laishram	20 November 2007 (age 18)	10	6	(All India Football Federation) NorthEast United
	MF	Md Arbash	29 September 2008 (age 18)	13	3	(All India Football Federation) Bengaluru
	MF	Rishi Singh Ningthoukhongjam	23 March 2008 (age 18)	11	0	(All India Football Federation) Bengaluru
	MF	Rishikanta Meitei Laishram	1 May 2007 (age 19)	7	0	(All India Football Federation) Punjab
	MF	Shami Singamayum	18 April 2007 (age 19)	7	3	(All India Football Federation) Punjab
	MF	Samson Ahongshangbam	23 December 2008 (age 17)	8	0	(All India Football Federation) Bengaluru
	MF	Aniket Yadav	19 November 2008 (age 17)	3	0	(All India Football Federation) Punjab
	FW	Gunleiba Wangkheirakpam	11 September 2009 (age 17)	2	0	(All India Football Federation) NorthEast United
	FW	Hateem Ali	29 December 2007 (age 18)	3	0	(United Arab Emirates Football Association) Shabab Al-Ahli
	FW	Omang Dodum	7 July 2007 (age 19)	11	6	(All India Football Federation) Punjab
	FW	Prashan Jajo	22 February 2007 (age 19)	11	3	(All India Football Federation) Sudeva Delhi
	FW	Vishal Yadav	15 January 2008 (age 18)	6	3	(All India Football Federation) Punjab
	FW	Rohen Singh Chaphamayum	22 April 2007 (age 19)	10	4	(All India Football Federation) Bengaluru
	FW	Daniyal Makakmayum	3 March 2007 (age 19)	1	0	(All India Football Federation) South United

=== Recent callups ===
The following footballers were part of national selection in the past twelve months, but are not part of the current call-up.

Pos.	Player	Date of birth (age)	Caps	Goals	Club	Latest call-up
GK	Shuhaid Koya Thangal	16 February 2007 (age 19)	0	0	(India) Sreenidi Deccan	Singapore, August 2026
GK	Alsabith Sulaiman Thekkekaramel	1 July 2007 (age 19)	0	0	(India) Kerala Blasters	2026 SAFF U-20 Championship
DF	Arshvir Singh	13 April 2007 (age 19)	0	0	(India) Punjab	Singapore, August 2026
DF	Ashik Adhikari	17 January 2007 (age 19)	0	0	(India) Bengaluru	Singapore, August 2026
DF	Jodric Abranches	12 July 2008 (age 18)	10	0	(India) Dempo	2026 SAFF U-20 Championship
DF	Mohammed Kaif	26 May 2008 (age 18)	2	0	(India) SC Delhi	2026 SAFF U-20 Championship
DF	Usham Singh Thoungamba	24 June 2008 (age 18)	1	0	(India) Punjab	2026 SAFF U-20 Championship
DF	Roshan Singh Thangjam	2 January 2007 (age 19)	6	0	(India) Mohun Bagan SG	2026 SAFF U-20 Championship
MF	Dallalmuon Gangte	11 July 2010 (age 16)	0	0	(India) NorthEast United	Singapore, August 2026
MF	Levis Zangminlun	7 January 2008 (age 18)	3	0	(India) Sreenidi Deccan	Singapore, August 2026
MF	Gurnaj Singh Grewal	9 January 2007 (age 19)	8	0	(India) Mohun Bagan SG	2026 SAFF U-20 Championship
FW	Agastya Bhat		0	0	(Spain) Atlético Marbella	Singapore, August 2026
FW	Nirupam Gowda H		0	0	(India) South United	Singapore, August 2026
FW	Yohaan Benjamin	29 August 2007 (age 19)	4	0	(Slovenia) NK Bravo	Singapore, August 2026
FW	Tanbir Dey	4 January 2008 (age 18)	1	0	(India) NorthEast United	2026 SAFF U-20 Championship

== Competitive record ==
*Denotes draws includes knockout matches decided on penalty kicks. Red border indicates that the tournament was hosted on home soil. Gold, silver, bronze backgrounds indicates 1st, 2nd and 3rd finishes respectively. Bold text indicates best finish in tournament.

=== FIFA U-20 World Cup ===
FIFA U-20 World Cup record
Host/Year	Result	Position	Pld	W	D*	L	GF	GA	GD
FIFA World Youth Championship
(Tunisia) 1977 to (Netherlands) 2005	Did not qualify								
FIFA U-20 World Cup
(Canada) 2007 to (Chile) 2025	Did not qualify								
(Azerbaijan) (Uzbekistan) 2027	To be determined								
Total	0/25	0 titles	–	–	–	–	–	–	–

=== AFC U-20 Asian Cup ===
AFC U-20 Asian Cup record										Qualification record							
Host/Year	Result	Position	Pld	W	D*	L	GF	GA	GD	Pld	W	D*	L	GF	GA	GD	Ref
(Malaysia) 1959 to (Thailand) 1962	Did not enter									No Qualifiers							
(Malaysia) 1963	Group stage	7th	5	2	1	2	6	5	+1	No Qualifiers							
(South Vietnam) 1964	Group stage	6th	3	0	2	1	1	4	−3	No Qualifiers							
(Japan) 1965	Group stage	7th	4	1	1	2	3	6	−3	No Qualifiers							
(Philippines) 1966	**Quarter final**	5th	5	3	0	2	9	7	+2	No Qualifiers							
(Thailand) 1967	**Quarter final**	7th	3	1	1	1	7	8	−1	No Qualifiers							
(South Korea) 1968	Group stage	11th	3	1	0	2	4	4	0	No Qualifiers							
(Thailand) 1969	Did not enter									No Qualifiers							
(Philippines) 1970	Did not enter									No Qualifiers							
(Japan) 1971	**Quarter final**	6th	4	2	1	1	5	5	0	No Qualifiers							
(Thailand) 1972	Group stage	11th	3	1	0	2	8	11	−3	No Qualifiers							
(Iran) 1973	Group stage	10th	3	0	2	1	1	2	−1	No Qualifiers							
(Thailand) **1974**	**Champions**	**1st**	**6**	**3**	**3**	**0**	**9**	**6**	**+3**	No Qualifiers							
(Kuwait) 1975	Group stage	13th	4	1	1	2	5	6	−1	No Qualifiers							
(Thailand) 1976	Group stage	9th	3	1	1	1	4	3	+1	No Qualifiers							
(Iran) 1977	**Quarter final**	5th	3	1	0	2	4	7	−3	No Qualifiers							
(Bangladesh) 1978	Group stage	6th	4	1	1	2	7	8	−1	No Qualifiers							
(Thailand) 1980 to (Thailand) 1982	Did not qualify									8	1	1	6	5	12	-7	
(United Arab Emirates) 1985	Did not enter									Did not enter							
(Saudi Arabia) 1986	Group stage	6th	3	0	1	2	2	8	−6	2	1	1	0	1	0	+1	
(Qatar) 1988	Did not enter									Did not enter							
(Indonesia) 1990	Group stage	6th	3	1	0	2	3	7	−4	3	2	1	0	7	1	+6	
(United Arab Emirates) 1992	Group stage	8th	3	0	0	3	0	7	−7	4	3	1	0	4	0	+4	
(Indonesia) 1994	Did not enter									Did not enter							
(South Korea) 1996	Group stage	8th	4	0	1	3	2	6	−4	2	2	0	0	12	1	+11	
(Thailand) 1998	Group stage	10th	4	0	1	3	3	10	−7	4	4	0	0	13	1	+12	
(Iran) 2000	Did not qualify									2	1	0	1	2	2	0	
(Qatar) 2002	**Quarter final**	8th	4	1	0	3	7	13	−6	3	2	1	0	8	1	+7	
(Malaysia) 2004	Group stage	13th	3	0	0	3	2	5	−3	2	0	1	1	0	2	-2	
(India) 2006	Group stage	13th	3	0	1	2	3	7	−4	Qualified as Hosts							
(Saudi Arabia) 2008	Did not qualify									5	1	1	3	8	6	+2	
(China) 2010	Did not qualify									5	2	0	3	11	13	-2	
(United Arab Emirates) 2012	Did not qualify									4	1	0	3	5	8	-3	
(Myanmar) 2014	Did not qualify									4	1	1	2	3	7	-4	
(Bahrain) 2016	Did not qualify									3	0	0	3	0	10	-10	
(Indonesia) 2018	Did not qualify									3	1	1	1	3	5	-2	
(Uzbekistan) 2020	Did not qualify									3	0	0	3	0	9	-9	—N/a
(Uzbekistan) 2023	Did not qualify									3	1	0	2	5	9	-4	
(China) 2025	Did not qualify									3	2	0	1	6	2	+4	
(China) 2027	Qualified									3	2	0	1	4	4	0	
Total	23/43	1 Title	80	20	18	42	95	145	−50	66	27	9	30	97	93	+4	–

AFC U-20 Asian Cup history
Year	Round	Score	Result
1963	Group A	India **1–1** Burma	Draw
1963	Group A	India **1–2** Malaysia	Loss
1963	Group A	India **0–2** Thailand	Loss
1963	Group A	India **2–0** Cambodia	Win
1963	Group A	India **2–0** Philippines	Win
1964	Group B	India **0–3** Burma	Loss
1964	Group B	India **0–0** Vietnam	Draw
1964	Group B	India **1–1** Malaysia	Draw
1965	Group B	India **1–2** Burma	Loss
1965	Group B	India **0–0** Thailand	Draw
1965	Group B	India **0–1** Malaysia	Loss
1965	Group B	India **1–4** South Korea	Loss
1966	Group B	India **2–0** Burma	Win
1966	Group B	India **2–0** Japan	Win
1966	Group B	India **4–1** Singapore	Win
1966	Group B	India **1–2** Taiwan	Loss
1966	Quarterfinals	India **0–4** Israel	Loss
1967	Group D	India **1–1** Israel	Draw
1967	Group D	India **4–1** Malaysia	Win
1967	Quarterfinals	India **2–6** Indonesia	Loss
1968	Group C	India **1–2** Malaysia	Loss
1968	Group C	India **3–0** Taiwan	Win
1968	Group C	India **0–2** Israel	Loss
1971	Group A	India **2–0** Philippines	Win
1971	Group A	India **2–1** Nepal	Win
1971	Group A	India **1–1** Burma	Draw
1971	Quarterfinals	India **0–3** Japan	Loss
1972	Group A	India **0–7** Israel	Loss
1972	Group A	India **1–4** Thailand	Loss
1972	Group A	India **7–0** Nepal	Win
1973	Group A	India **0–0** Lebanon	Draw
1973	Group A	India **1–1** Bahrain	Draw
1973	Group A	India **0–1** South Korea	Loss
1974	Group B	India **1–0** Laos	Win
1974	Group B	India **1–0** Burma	Win
1974	Group B	India **2–2** Hong Kong	Draw
1974	Quarterfinals	India **1–1** Singapore (4–1) P	Draw
1974	Semifinals	India **2–1** Thailand	Win
1974	Final	India **2–2** Iran (Title shared)	Draw
1975	Group D	India **1–1** Malaysia	Draw
1975	Group D	India **1–2** Yemen	Loss
1975	Group D	India **1–2** Burma	Loss
1975	Group D	India **2–1** North Korea	Win
1976	Group A	India **0–2** Iran	Loss
1976	Group A	India **1–1** South Korea	Draw
1976	Group A	India **3–0** Malaysia	Win
1977	Group B	India **0–4** Iraq	Loss
1977	Group B	India **4–0** Bangladesh	Win
1977	Quarterfinals	India **0–3** Iran	Loss
1978	Group B	India **0–2** North Korea	Loss
1978	Group B	India **2–2** Japan	Draw
1978	Group B	India **4–0** Sri Lanka	Win
1978	Group B	India **1–4** Saudi Arabia	Loss
1986	Group A	India **0–4** Saudi Arabia	Loss
1986	Group A	India **1–3** Qatar	Loss
1986	Group A	India **1–1** Indonesia	Draw
1990	Group A	India **1–4** North Korea	Loss
1990	Group A	India **0–2** Qatar	Loss
1990	Group A	India **2–1** Indonesia	Win
1992	Group A	India **0–2** Japan	Loss
1992	Group A	India **0–3** United Arab Emirates	Loss
1992	Group A	India **0–2** Iran	Loss
1996	Group B	India **1–1** Qatar	Draw
1996	Group B	India **1–2** China	Loss
1996	Group B	India **0–1** Syria	Loss
1996	Group B	India **0–2** Japan	Loss
1998	Group A	India **2–3** Kazakhstan	Loss
1998	Group A	India **0–4** Thailand	Loss
1998	Group A	India **0–2** Saudi Arabia	Loss
1998	Group A	India **1–1** Kuwait	Draw
2002	Group B	India **6–0** Bangladesh	Win
2002	Group B	India **1–2** Japan	Loss
2002	Group B	India **0–4** Saudi Arabia	Loss
2002	Quarterfinals	India **0–7** South Korea	Loss
2004	Group C	India **1–2** Syria	Loss
2004	Group C	India **1–2** Uzbekistan	Loss
2004	Group C	India **0–1** Laos	Loss
2006	Group A	India **1–1** Kyrgyzstan	Draw
2006	Group A	India **2–3** Jordan	Loss
2006	Group A	India **0–3** South Korea	Loss

AFC U-20 Asian Cup Qualification history
Year	Round	Score	Result
1980	Group 1	India **2–1** Nepal	Win
1980	Group 1	India **1–1** Oman	Draw
1980	Group 1	India **0–1** Qatar	Loss
1980	Group 1	India **0–1** Bangladesh	Loss
1982	Group A	India **1–2** Iran	Loss
1982	Group A	India **n/a** Nepal	Loss
1982	Group A	India **1–3** Oman	Loss
1982	Group A	India **0–3** Saudi Arabia	Loss
1986	Group 5	India **0–0** Nepal	Draw
1986	Group 5	India **1–0** Pakistan	Win
1990	Group 4	India **5–0** Sri Lanka	Win
1990	Group 4	India **2–1** Maldives	Win
1990	Group 4	India **0–0** Nepal	Draw
1992	Group 3	India **2–0** Pakistan	Win
1992	Group 3	India **1–0** Nepal	Win
1992	Group 3	India **0–0** Bangladesh	Draw
1992	Group 3	India **1–0** Maldives	Win
1996	Group 5	India **6–1** Pakistan	Win
1996	Group 5	India **6–0** Sri Lanka	Win
1998	Group 6	India **1–0** Maldives	Win
1998	Group 6	India **3–0** Kyrgyzstan	Win
1998	Group 6	India **2–0** Pakistan	Win
1998	Group 6	India **7–1** Bhutan	Win
2000	Group 5	India **2–0** Sri Lanka	Win
2000	Group 5	India **0–2** Pakistan	Loss
2002	Group 4	India **4–1** Bhutan	Win
2002	Group 4	India **0–0** Tajikistan	Draw
2002	Group 4	India **4–0** Kyrgyzstan	Win
2004	Group 8	India **0–0** Kyrgyzstan	Draw
2004	Group 8	India **0–2** Turkmenistan	Loss
2008	Group B	India **2–3** Lebanon	Loss
2008	Group B	India **0–1** Bahrain	Loss
2008	Group B	India **5–0** Pakistan	Win
2008	Group B	India **1–1** Oman	Draw
2008	Group B	India **0–1** Iran	Loss
2010	Group C	India **0–5** Iraq	Loss
2010	Group C	India **1–3** Saudi Arabia	Loss
2010	Group C	India **3–4** Oman	Loss
2010	Group C	India **4–1** Afghanistan	Win
2010	Group C	India **3–0** Kuwait	Win
2012	Group C	India **3–1** Turkmenistan	Win
2012	Group C	India **0–3** Iran	Loss
2012	Group C	India **1–2** Uzbekistan	Loss
2012	Group C	India **1–2** Pakistan	Loss
2014	Group A	India **0–2** Qatar	Loss
2014	Group A	India **1–0** Nepal	Win
2014	Group A	India **0–3** Uzbekistan	Loss
2014	Group A	India **2–2** Turkmenistan	Draw
2016	Group C	India **0–7** United Arab Emirates	Loss
2016	Group C	India **0–1** Palestine	Loss
2016	Group C	India **0–2** Afghanistan	Loss
2018	Group D	India **0–5** Saudi Arabia	Loss
2018	Group D	India **0–0** Palestine	Draw
2018	Group D	India **3–0** Turkmenistan	Win
2020	Group F	India **0–2** Uzbekistan	Loss
2020	Group F	India **0–4** Saudi Arabia	Loss
2020	Group F	India **0–3** Afghanistan	Loss
2023	Group H	India **2–4** Iraq	Loss
2023	Group H	India **1–4** Australia	Loss
2023	Group H	India **2–1** Kuwait	Win
2025	Group G	India **4–1** Mongolia	Win
2025	Group G	India **0–1** Iran	Loss
2025	Group G	India **2–0** Laos	Win
2027	Group B	India **1–0** Syria	Win
2027	Group B	India **0–4** Uzbekistan	Loss
2027	Group B	India **3–0** Bangladesh	Win

=== SAFF U-18/U-19/U-20 Championship ===
SAFF U-18/U-19/U-20 Championship record
Host/Year	Result	Position	Pld	W	D*	L	GF	GA	GD
(Nepal) 2015	Runners-up	2nd	4	2	2	0	6	1	+5
(Bhutan) 2017	Third place	3rd	4	2	0	2	8	7	+1
(Nepal) 2019	Champions	1st	4	3	1	0	9	1	+8
(India) 2022	Champions	1st	5	4	0	1	19	4	+15
(Nepal) 2023	Champions	1st	4	3	1	0	9	2	+7
(Nepal) 2024	Semi-final	3rd	3	2	1	0	3	1	+2
(India) 2025	Champions	1st	4	3	1	0	16	1	+15
(Maldives) 2026	Runners-up	2nd	4	2	2	0	9	1	+8
Total	8/8	4 Titles	32	21	8	3	79	18	+61

SAFF U-20 Championship history
Year	Round	Score	Result
2015	Group B	India **2–0** Afghanistan	Win
2015	Group B	India **3–0** Maldives	Win
2015	Semi-final	India **0–0** Bangladesh (4–3) P	Draw
2015	Final	India **1–1** Nepal (4–5) P	Draw
2017	Round robin	India **3–4** Bangladesh	Loss
2017	Round robin	India **3–0** Bhutan	Win
2017	Round robin	India **2–1** Maldives	Win
2017	Round robin	India **0–2** Nepal	Loss
2019	Group B	India **0–0** Bangladesh	Draw
2019	Group B	India **3–0** Sri Lanka	Win
2019	Semi-final	India **4–0** Maldives	Win
2019	Final	India **2–1** Bangladesh	Win
2022	Round Robin	India **1–2** Bangladesh	Loss
2022	Round Robin	India **4–0** Sri Lanka	Win
2022	Round Robin	India **8–0** Nepal	Win
2022	Round Robin	India **1–0** Maldives	Win
2022	Final	India **5–2** Bangladesh	Win
2023	Group B	India **3–0** Bangladesh	Win
2023	Group B	India **2–1** Bhutan	Win
2023	Semi-final	India **1–1** Nepal (5–4) P	Draw
2023	Final	India **3–0** Pakistan	Win
2024	Group B	India **1–0** Bhutan	Win
2024	Group B	India **1–0** Maldives	Win
2024	Semi-final	India **1–1** Bangladesh (3–4) P	Draw
2025	Group B	India **8–0** Sri Lanka	Win
2025	Group B	India **4–0** Nepal	Win
2025	Semi-final	India **3–0** Maldives	Win
2025	Final	India **1–1** Bangladesh (4–3) P	Draw
2026	Group B	India **3–0** Pakistan	Win
2026	Group B	India **1–1** Bangladesh	Draw
2026	Semi-final	India **5–0** Bhutan	Win
2026	Final	India **0–0** Bangladesh (3–4) P	Draw

=== South Asian Games ===
South Asian Games record
Year	Result	Position	Pld	W	T	L	GF	GA	Ref.
1984–1999	See India national football team								
(Pakistan) 2004	**Runners–up**	**2nd**	**5**	**3**	**1**	**1**	**7**	**2**	
(Sri Lanka) 2006	**Semi–finals**	**4th**	**5**	**1**	**3**	**1**	**4**	**5**	
(Bangladesh) 2010	**Semi-finals**	**4th**	**5**	**1**	**2**	**2**	**5**	**3**	
2016–present	Played by India national under-23 football team								
Total	3 Editions	0 Titles	15	5	6	4	16	10	—

== Overall competitive records ==
As of 6 September 2026 vs Bangladesh (excluding friendlies & minor tournaments)

Competition	Pld	W	D	L	GF	GA	GD	Win%
FIFA U-20 World Cup	0	0	0	0	0	0	+0	—
AFC U-20 Asian Cup	80	20	18	42	95	145	−50	25.00
AFC U-20 Asian Cup Qualification	66	27	9	30	97	93	+4	40.91
SAFF U-20 Championship	32	21	8	3	79	18	+61	65.63
South Asian Games	15	5	6	4	16	10	+6	33.33
Total	193	72	41	80	286	267	+19	37.31

== Head-to-head record ==
As of 6 September 2026 vs Bangladesh (excluding friendlies & minor tournaments)

The following table shows India's head-to-head record in the official tournaments of the AFC U-20 Asian Cup (including qualifiers), the SAFF U-20 Championship and the South Asian Games

Positive Record Neutral Record Negative Record

Opponent	Pld	W	D	L	GF	GA	GD	Win %
Afghanistan	7	3	1	3	8	7	+1	42.86
Australia	1	0	0	1	1	4	−3	0.00
Bahrain	2	0	1	1	1	2	−1	0.00
Bangladesh	19	7	8	4	32	15	+17	36.84
Bhutan	7	7	0	0	26	4	+22	100.00
Cambodia	1	1	0	0	2	0	+2	100.00
China	1	0	0	1	1	2	−1	0.00
Chinese Taipei	2	1	0	1	4	2	+2	50.00
Hong Kong	1	0	1	0	2	2	+0	0.00
Indonesia	3	1	1	1	5	8	−3	33.33
Iran	8	0	1	7	3	16	−13	0.00
Iraq	3	0	0	3	2	13	−11	0.00
Israel	4	0	1	3	1	14	−13	0.00
Japan	6	1	1	4	5	11	−6	16.67
Jordan	1	0	0	1	2	3	−1	0.00
Kazakhstan	1	0	0	1	2	3	−1	0.00
Kuwait	3	2	1	0	6	2	+4	66.67
Kyrgyzstan	4	2	2	0	8	1	+7	50.00
Laos	3	2	0	1	3	1	+2	66.67
Lebanon	2	0	1	1	2	3	−1	0.00
Malaysia	7	2	2	3	11	8	+3	28.57
Maldives	10	9	1	0	18	2	+16	90.00
Mongolia	1	1	0	0	4	1	+3	100.00
Myanmar	7	2	2	3	7	9	−2	28.57
North Korea	3	1	0	2	3	7	−4	33.33
Nepal	15	7	5	3	28	11	+17	46.67
Oman	4	0	2	2	6	9	−3	0.00
Pakistan	12	9	0	3	29	7	+22	75.00
Palestine	2	0	1	1	0	1	−1	0.00
Philippines	2	2	0	0	4	0	+4	100.00
Qatar	5	0	1	4	2	9	−7	0.00
Saudi Arabia	8	0	0	8	2	29	−27	0.00
Singapore	2	1	1	0	5	2	+3	50.00
South Korea	5	0	1	4	2	16	−14	0.00
Sri Lanka	9	7	2	0	33	1	+32	77.78
Syria	3	1	0	2	2	3	−1	33.33
Tajikistan	1	0	1	0	0	0	+0	0.00
Thailand	5	1	1	3	3	11	−8	20.00
Turkmenistan	4	2	1	1	8	5	+3	50.00
United Arab Emirates	2	0	0	2	0	10	−10	0.00
Uzbekistan	5	0	0	5	2	13	−11	0.00
Vietnam	1	0	1	0	0	0	+0	0.00
Yemen	1	0	0	1	1	2	−1	0.00
Total	193	72	41	80	286	267	+19	37.31

== Other honours ==
- POMIS Cup
  - Champions (1): 1990
- Lusofonia Games:
  - Gold Medal (1): 2014 (as Goa India)
- OFC Youth Development Tournament
  - Champions (1): 2019

== See also ==
- India national football team
- India women's national football team
- Sport in India
- Football in India
- Women's football in India
- India women's national football team
- India national futsal team
- India women's national futsal team
- India national beach soccer team
- Football at the Asian Games
- Football at the Summer Olympics
- List of India national football team hat-tricks
- List of India national football team captains
- AIFF Player of the Year Awards
- FPAI Indian Player of the Year

Awards and achievements
Preceded by 1973 Iran	Asian Champions; 1974 (first title)	Succeeded by 1975 Iran & Iraq
