= 2004 AFC Youth Championship qualification =

The AFC Youth Championship 2004 qualification was held in 15 places in 2003, Malaysia with 15 qualified teams advanced to the final phase.

== Qualification Stage ==
=== Group A ===
| Team | Pld | W | D | L | GF | GA | GD | Pts |
|---|---|---|---|---|---|---|---|---|
| Qatar (H) | 2 | 1 | 1 | 0 | 2 | 1 | +1 | 4 |
| United Arab Emirates | 2 | 0 | 2 | 0 | 2 | 2 | 0 | 2 |
| Lebanon | 2 | 0 | 1 | 1 | 1 | 2 | −1 | 1 |

Source: RSSSF

All matches played in Qatar.

19 October 2003

| United Arab Emirates | 1–1 | Qatar |

21 October 2003

| Qatar | 1–0 | Lebanon |

23 October 2003

| Lebanon | 1–1 | United Arab Emirates |

=== Group B ===
| Team | Pld | W | D | L | GF | GA | GD | Pts |
|---|---|---|---|---|---|---|---|---|
| Iraq | 2 | 2 | 0 | 0 | 3 | 0 | +3 | 6 |
| Bahrain | 2 | 1 | 0 | 1 | 1 | 1 | 0 | 3 |
| Jordan (H) | 2 | 0 | 0 | 2 | 0 | 3 | −3 | 0 |

Source: RSSSF

All matches played in Jordan.

19 October 2003

| Iraq | 1–0 | Bahrain |

21 October 2003

| Bahrain | 1–0 | Jordan |

23 October 2003

| Jordan | 0–2 | Iraq |

=== Group C ===
| Team | Pld | W | D | L | GF | GA | GD | Pts |
|---|---|---|---|---|---|---|---|---|
| Syria | 2 | 2 | 0 | 0 | 10 | 2 | +8 | 6 |
| Kuwait | 2 | 1 | 0 | 1 | 8 | 5 | +3 | 3 |
| Palestine | 2 | 0 | 0 | 2 | 2 | 13 | −11 | 0 |

Source: RSSSF

All matches played in Syria.

19 October 2003

| Syria | 4–1 | Kuwait |

21 October 2003

| Kuwait | 7–1 | Palestine |

23 October 2003

| Palestine | 1–6 | Syria |

=== Group D ===
| Team | Pld | W | D | L | GF | GA | GD | Pts |
|---|---|---|---|---|---|---|---|---|
| Yemen | 2 | 2 | 0 | 0 | 3 | 0 | +3 | 6 |
| Oman | 2 | 1 | 0 | 1 | 1 | 1 | 0 | 3 |
| Saudi Arabia | 2 | 0 | 0 | 2 | 0 | 3 | −3 | 0 |

Source: RSSSF

All matches played in Yemen.

19 October 2003

| Saudi Arabia | 0–1 | Oman |

21 October 2003

| Oman | 0–1 | Yemen |

23 October 2003

| Yemen | 2–0 | Saudi Arabia |

=== Group E ===
| Team | Pld | W | D | L | GF | GA | GD | Pts |
|---|---|---|---|---|---|---|---|---|
| Nepal | 2 | 1 | 1 | 0 | 4 | 1 | +3 | 4 |
| Bangladesh | 2 | 1 | 1 | 0 | 2 | 1 | +1 | 4 |
| Pakistan | 2 | 0 | 0 | 2 | 0 | 4 | −4 | 0 |

Source: RSSSF

All matches played in Bangladesh.

1 December 2003

| Bangladesh | 1–0 | Pakistan |

3 December 2003

| Pakistan | 0–3 | Nepal |

5 December 2003

| Nepal | 1–1 | Bangladesh |

=== Group F ===
| Team | Pld | W | D | L | GF | GA | GD | Pts |
|---|---|---|---|---|---|---|---|---|
| Uzbekistan | 2 | 2 | 0 | 0 | 8 | 0 | +8 | 6 |
| Sri Lanka | 2 | 0 | 1 | 1 | 0 | 3 | −3 | 1 |
| Bhutan | 2 | 0 | 1 | 1 | 0 | 5 | −5 | 1 |

Source: RSSSF

All matches played in Uzbekistan.

19 October 2003

| Uzbekistan | 3–0 | Sri Lanka |

21 October 2003

| Sri Lanka | 0–0 | Bhutan |

23 October 2003

| Bhutan | 0–5 | Uzbekistan |

=== Group G ===
| Team | Pld | W | D | L | GF | GA | GD | Pts |
|---|---|---|---|---|---|---|---|---|
| Iran | 2 | 2 | 0 | 0 | 8 | 1 | +7 | 6 |
| Tajikistan | 2 | 1 | 0 | 1 | 4 | 3 | +1 | 3 |
| Afghanistan | 2 | 0 | 0 | 2 | 1 | 9 | −8 | 0 |

Source: RSSSF

All matches played in Iran.

19 October 2003

| Iran | 2–1 | Tajikistan |

21 October 2003

| Tajikistan | 3–1 | Afghanistan |

23 October 2003

| Afghanistan | 0–6 | Iran |

=== Group H ===
| Team | Pld | W | D | L | GF | GA | GD | Pts |
|---|---|---|---|---|---|---|---|---|
| Turkmenistan | 2 | 2 | 0 | 0 | 4 | 0 | +4 | 6 |
| India | 2 | 0 | 1 | 1 | 0 | 2 | −2 | 1 |
| Kyrgyzstan | 2 | 0 | 1 | 1 | 0 | 2 | −2 | 1 |

Source: RSSSF

All matches played in Turkmenistan.

19 October 2003

| India | 0–0 | Kyrgyzstan |

21 October 2003

| Kyrgyzstan | 0–2 | Turkmenistan |

23 October 2003

| Turkmenistan | 2–0 | India |

- Turkmenistan qualified, but later withdrew, India replaced.

=== Group I ===
| Team | Pld | W | D | L | GF | GA | GD | Pts |
|---|---|---|---|---|---|---|---|---|
| Vietnam | 2 | 2 | 0 | 0 | 9 | 2 | +7 | 6 |
| Myanmar | 2 | 1 | 0 | 1 | 5 | 2 | +3 | 3 |
| Brunei | 2 | 0 | 0 | 2 | 3 | 13 | −10 | 0 |

Source: RSSSF

All matches played in Vietnam.

19 October 2003

| Vietnam | 1–0 | Myanmar |

21 October 2003

| Myanmar | 5–1 | Brunei |

23 October 2003

| Brunei | 2–8 | Vietnam |

=== Group J ===
| Team | Pld | W | D | L | GF | GA | GD | Pts |
|---|---|---|---|---|---|---|---|---|
| Laos | 2 | 2 | 0 | 0 | 6 | 0 | +6 | 6 |
| Cambodia | 2 | 0 | 0 | 2 | 0 | 6 | −6 | 0 |

Source: RSSSF

All matches played in Laos.

25 October 2003

| Laos | 1–0 | Cambodia |

27 October 2003

| Cambodia | 0–5 | Laos |

=== Group K ===
| Team | Pld | W | D | L | GF | GA | GD | Pts |
|---|---|---|---|---|---|---|---|---|
| Indonesia | 2 | 2 | 0 | 0 | 7 | 0 | +7 | 6 |
| Philippines | 2 | 1 | 0 | 1 | 2 | 4 | −2 | 3 |
| Maldives | 2 | 0 | 0 | 2 | 0 | 5 | −5 | 0 |

Source: RSSSF

All matches played in Indonesia.

10 December 2003

| Indonesia | 3–0 | Maldives |

12 December 2003

| Maldives | 0–2 | Philippines |

14 December 2003

| Philippines | 0–4 | Indonesia |

=== Group L ===
| Team | Pld | W | D | L | GF | GA | GD | Pts |
|---|---|---|---|---|---|---|---|---|
| Thailand | 2 | 2 | 0 | 0 | 4 | 0 | +4 | 6 |
| Singapore | 2 | 0 | 0 | 2 | 0 | 4 | −4 | 0 |

Source: RSSSF

All matches played in Singapore.

21 October 2003

| Thailand | 2–0 | Singapore |

23 October 2003

| Singapore | 0–2 | Thailand |

=== Group M ===
| Team | Pld | W | D | L | GF | GA | GD | Pts |
|---|---|---|---|---|---|---|---|---|
| Japan | 2 | 2 | 0 | 0 | 14 | 0 | +14 | 6 |
| Chinese Taipei | 2 | 1 | 0 | 1 | 3 | 7 | −4 | 3 |
| Macau | 2 | 0 | 0 | 2 | 0 | 10 | −10 | 0 |

Source: RSSSF

All matches played in Japan.

19 October 2003

| Japan | 7–0 | Chinese Taipei |

21 October 2003

| Chinese Taipei | 3–0 | Macau |

23 October 2003

| Macau | 0–7 | Japan |

=== Group N ===
| Team | Pld | W | D | L | GF | GA | GD | Pts |
|---|---|---|---|---|---|---|---|---|
| South Korea | 2 | 2 | 0 | 0 | 22 | 0 | +22 | 6 |
| Mongolia | 2 | 0 | 0 | 2 | 0 | 22 | −22 | 0 |

Source: RSSSF

All matches played in South Korea.

21 October 2003

| South Korea | 12–0 | Mongolia |

23 October 2003

| Mongolia | 0–10 | South Korea |

=== Group O ===
| Team | Pld | W | D | L | GF | GA | GD | Pts |
|---|---|---|---|---|---|---|---|---|
| China | 2 | 2 | 0 | 0 | 10 | 0 | +10 | 6 |
| Hong Kong | 2 | 1 | 0 | 1 | 9 | 2 | +7 | 3 |
| Guam | 2 | 0 | 0 | 2 | 0 | 17 | −17 | 0 |

Source: RSSSF

All matches played in China.

19 October 2003

| China | 2–0 | Hong Kong |

21 October 2003

| Hong Kong | 9–0 | Guam |

23 October 2003

| Guam | 0–8 | China |
