= 1996 AFC Youth Championship qualification =

The qualification of AFC Youth Championship 1996 was held from 13 May to 28 August.

== Group 1 ==
All match played in Al-Ain, United Arab Emirates from 24 to 28 August.

Team	Pld	W	D	L	GF	GA	GD	Pts
United Arab Emirates	3	3	0	0	8	2	+6	9
Uzbekistan	3	2	0	1	10	5	+5	6
Kuwait	3	1	0	2	5	6	−1	3
Kyrgyzstan	3	0	0	3	2	12	−10	0

== Group 2 ==
All match played in Doha, Qatar from 25 to 29 July.

Team	Pld	W	D	L	GF	GA	GD	Pts
Qatar	3	3	0	0	5	2	+3	9
Oman	3	2	0	1	10	5	+5	6
Turkmenistan	3	1	0	2	5	7	−2	3
Lebanon	3	0	0	3	1	7	−6	0

== Group 3 ==
All matches played in Al-Hasa, Saudi Arabia from 15 to 19 May.

Team	Pld	W	D	L	GF	GA	GD	Pts
Iran	3	2	1	0	9	1	+8	7
Saudi Arabia	3	2	1	0	8	3	+5	7
Kazakhstan	3	1	0	2	2	7	−5	3
Tajikistan	3	0	0	3	1	9	−8	0

== Group 4 ==
All match played in Damascus, Syria from 24 to 28 April.

Team	Pld	W	D	L	GF	GA	GD	Pts
Syria	2	2	0	0	5	0	+5	6
Bahrain	2	1	0	1	2	2	0	3
Jordan	2	0	0	2	0	5	−5	0

== Group 5 ==
All match played in Kannur, India from 9 to 13 July.

Team	Pld	W	D	L	GF	GA	GD	Pts
India	2	2	0	0	12	1	+11	6
Sri Lanka	2	1	0	1	2	7	−5	3
Pakistan	2	0	0	2	2	8	−6	0

== Group 6 ==
Both match played in Malé, Maldives from 27 to 29 July.

Team	Pld	W	D	L	GF	GA	GD	Pts
Bangladesh	2	2	0	0	8	0	+8	6
Maldives	2	0	0	2	0	8	−8	0

== Group 7 ==
All match played in Bangkok, Thailand from 13 to 17 May.

Team	Pld	W	D	L	GF	GA	GD	Pts
Thailand	3	3	0	0	24	1	+23	9
Malaysia	3	2	0	1	8	2	+6	6
Nepal	3	1	0	2	1	8	−7	3
Macau	3	0	0	3	0	22	−22	0

== Group 8 ==
All match played in Baoding, China from 19 to 22 June.

Team	Pld	W	D	L	GF	GA	GD	Pts
China	3	3	0	0	17	0	+17	9
Indonesia	3	1	1	1	8	5	+3	4
Hong Kong	3	1	1	1	4	6	−2	4
Vietnam	3	0	0	3	1	19	−18	0

== Group 9 ==
All match played in Bandar Seri Begawan, Brunei from 21 to 25 June.

Team	Pld	W	D	L	GF	GA	GD	Pts
Japan	3	3	0	0	19	0	+19	9
Singapore	3	1	1	1	3	5	−2	4
Brunei	3	0	2	1	1	12	−11	2
Chinese Taipei	3	0	1	2	1	7	−6	1

== Qualified teams ==
Total 10 teams qualified for 1996 AFC Youth Championship.

- South Korea (host nation)
- United Arab Emirates
- Qatar
- Iran
- Syria
- India
- Bangladesh
- Thailand
- China
- Japan
