= 2000 AFC Youth Championship qualification =

2000 AFC Youth Championship Qualifiers
Tournament details
- Host countries: Lebanon; Kuwait; Saudi Arabia; Bangladesh; Sri Lanka; China; Thailand; Guam; Malaysia
- Dates: 9 April – 23 August 2000
- Teams: 39 (from 1 confederation)
- Venue: (in 9 host cities)

The 2000 AFC Youth Championship qualifying competition is a men's under-19 football competition that determined the nine teams joining the automatically qualified hosts Iran in the 2000 AFC Youth Championship final tournament.

A total of 39 AFC member national teams entered the qualifying competition. Players born on or after 1 January 1981 were eligible to participate.

== Group stage ==
=== Group 1 ===
Pos	Team	Pld	W	D	L	GF	GA	GD	Pts	Qualification
1	Oman (Q)	4	3	1	0	8	1	+7	10	Final tournament
2	Syria	4	3	1	0	8	2	+6	10	
3	Qatar	4	2	0	2	6	5	+1	6	
4	Lebanon (H)	4	1	0	3	5	9	−4	3	
5	Tajikistan	4	0	0	4	1	11	−10	0	

Source: AFC
Rules for classification: Qualification tiebreakers
(H) Hosts; (Q) Qualified for the phase indicated
9 April 2000

Qatar	1-2	Oman

Beirut
9 April 2000

Lebanon	4–1	Tajikistan

Beirut

11 April 2000

Syria	3–0	Tajikistan

Aleppo
11 April 2000

Qatar	3–0	Lebanon

Beirut

13 April 2000

Syria	3–1	Qatar

Beirut
13 April 2000

Oman	3–0	Lebanon

Beirut

15 April 2000

Tajikistan	0-1	Qatar

Beirut
15 April 2000

Oman	0-0	Syria

Beirut

17 April 2000

Tajikistan	0-3	Oman

Beirut
17 April 2000

Lebanon	1-2	Syria

Beirut

=== Group 2 ===
Pos	Team	Pld	W	D	L	GF	GA	GD	Pts	Qualification
1	Kuwait (H, Q)	4	4	0	0	12	4	+8	12	Final tournament
2	Bahrain	4	2	1	1	9	5	+4	7	
3	Kazakhstan	4	1	2	1	5	6	−1	5	
4	Jordan	4	1	1	2	5	6	−1	4	
5	Turkmenistan	4	0	0	4	0	10	−10	0	

Source: AFC
Rules for classification: Qualification tiebreakers
(H) Hosts; (Q) Qualified for the phase indicated
10 July 2000

Bahrain	2-2	Kazakhstan

Kuwait
10 July 2000

Kuwait	4-0	Turkmenistan

Kuwait

12 July 2000

Jordan	2-2	Kazakhstan

Kuwait
12 July 2000

Kuwait	3-2	Bahrain

Kuwait

14 July 2000

Bahrain	1-0	Jordan

Kuwait
14 July 2000

Bahrain	1-0	Jordan

Kuwait

16 July 2000

Kuwait	2-0	Kazakhstan

Kuwait
16 July 2000

Jordan	1-0	Turkmenistan

Kuwait

18 July 2000

Bahrain	4-0	Turkmenistan

Kuwait
18 July 2000

Kuwait	3-2	Jordan

Kuwait

=== Group 2 ===
Pos	Team	Pld	W	D	L	GF	GA	GD	Pts	Qualification
1	United Arab Emirates (Q)	4	4	0	0	12	4	+8	12	Final tournament
2	Saudi Arabia (H)	4	2	1	1	9	5	+4	7	
3	Uzbekistan	4	1	2	1	5	6	−1	5	
4	Yemen	4	1	1	2	5	6	−1	4	
5	Kyrgyzstan	4	0	0	4	0	10	−10	0	

Source: AFC
Rules for classification: Qualification tiebreakers
(H) Hosts; (Q) Qualified for the phase indicated
15 August 2000

Saudi Arabia	2-0	Kyrgyzstan

Saudi Arabia
15 August 2000

Yemen	1-2	United Arab Emirates

Saudi Arabia

17 August 2000

Saudi Arabia	3-3	United Arab Emirates

Saudi Arabia
17 August 2000

Kyrgyzstan	1-3	Uzbekistan

Saudi Arabia

19 August 2000

Yemen	2-3	Uzbekistan

Saudi Arabia
19 August 2000

United Arab Emirates	6-1	Kyrgyzstan

Saudi Arabia
