= Philippines national under-20 football team =

Philippines U-20
- Association: Philippine Football Federation
- Confederation: AFC (Asia)
- Sub-confederation: AFF (South-East Asia)
- Head coach: Dimas Delgado
- FIFA code: PHI

Biggest win
- Philippines 4–0 Brunei (Buriram, Thailand; September 29, 2024)

Biggest defeat
- Thailand 12–0 Philippines (Bangkok, Thailand; April 2, 2002)

FIFA U-20 World Cup
- Appearances: 0

AFC U-20 Asian Cup
- Appearances: 13 (first in 1959)
- Best result: Second stage (1968)

ASEAN U-19 Boys' Championship
- Appearances: 12 (first in 2002)
- Best result: Group stage (2002)

The Philippines national under-20 football team is the national football team of the Philippines and represents in international football competitions such as AFC U-20 Asian Cup, ASEAN U-19 Boys' Championship and any other under-20 international football tournaments. The Philippine Youth National Team or PYNT is controlled by the Philippine Football Federation (PFF), the governing body of football in the Philippines.

== Club participation ==
The team participated as the PFF Youth National Team at the 2024–25 Philippines Football League.

== Results and fixtures ==
The following is a list of match results in the last 12 months, as well as any future matches that have been scheduled.

Win Draw Lose Void

=== 2026 ===
June 3 2026 ASEAN U-19 Boys Championship	Philippines	0–10	Australia	Central Jakarta, Indonesia
20:00 UTC+7		Report	Memeti 7' (pen.), 26', 41', 65', 71'; L. Wong 58', 61'; A. Nunes 64' (pen.); Macallister 70', 82'	Stadium: Gelora Bung Karno Madya Stadium; Referee: Ryo Tanimoto (Japan)

June 6 2026 ASEAN U-19 Boys Championship	Cambodia	3–0	Philippines	Medan, Indonesia
20:00 UTC+7	Seth 4', 14'; Sitha 39'	Report		Stadium: Stadion Madya Atletik Sumatera Utara

August 31 2027 AFC U-20 Asian Cup qualification	Kyrgyzstan	v	Philippines	Bishkek, Kyrgyzstan
--:-- UTC+6

September 3 2027 AFC U-20 Asian Cup qualification	Philippines	v	South Korea	Bishkek, Kyrgyzstan
--:-- UTC+6

September 6 2027 AFC U-20 Asian Cup qualification	Philippines	v	Lebanon	Bishkek, Kyrgyzstan
--:-- UTC+6

== Coaching staff ==
=== Current coaching staff ===
Updated as of May 25, 2026

Position	Name	Ref.
Head coach	(Spain) Dimas Delgado	
Assistant coaches	(Philippines) Bryan Capistrano	
Assistant coaches	(Spain) Sergi Mascarell	
Assistant coaches	(Philippines) Tomasito Glenn Ramos	
Assistant coaches	(Philippines) Vincent Santos	
Goalkeeping coach	(Spain) Joan Drets	

=== Coaching history ===
List of head coaches of the Philippines U-19
Country	Name	Period	Ref.
Philippines	Noel Marcaida	2009	
Philippines	Marlon Maro	2013	
Philippines	Dan Padernal	2015−2016	
Philippines	Noel Marcaida	2016	
Philippines	Jose Maria Aberasturi	2017	
Japan	Reiji Hirata	2018	
Philippines	Christopher Pedimonte	2018−2022	
Spain	Josep Ferré	2024−2025	
Spain	Dimas Delgado	2026−Present	

== Players ==
=== Current squad ===
The following are included in the 24-man squad for the 2025 AFC U-20 Asian Cup qualifiers.
Caps and goals updated as of 29 September 2024, after the match against Brunei.

No.	Pos.	Player	Date of birth (age)	Caps	Goals	Club
1	GK	Iñigo Castro III	July 2, 2006 (aged 18)	7	0	(United States Soccer Federation) Combine Rush Soccer
15	GK	Luc Narido	August 9, 2007 (aged 17)	1	0	(United States Soccer Federation) Santa Cruz Breakers
16	GK	Edcel Lauron	September 11, 2006 (aged 18)	0	0	(Philippine Football Federation) University of Santo Tomas
2	DF	Caleb Santos	October 4, 2005 (aged 18)	1	0	(Royal Spanish Football Federation) Odisea
4	DF	Jian Caraig	August 6, 2005 (aged 19)	5	0	(Royal Spanish Football Federation) Odisea
6	DF	Bryan Villanueva	July 30, 2006 (aged 18)	4	0	(Philippine Football Federation) Tuloy
8	DF	Alexander Sabatin	January 27, 2006 (aged 18)	3	0	(Canadian Soccer Association) Sigma
9	DF	Ichiro Koyama	December 5, 2006 (aged 17)	5	0	(German Football Association) 08 Homburg
14	DF	Bacchus Ekberg	August 16, 2006 (aged 18)	3	1	(Philippine Football Federation) De La Salle University
17	DF	Justin Oğur	January 2, 2006 (aged 18)	5	0	(Turkish Football Federation) Gaziantep
21	DF	Timofey Abenoya	August 6, 2005 (aged 19)	1	0	Unattached
3	MF	Javier Bengson	February 9, 2006 (aged 18)	4	0	(Philippine Football Federation) Ateneo de Manila University
5	MF	Joshua Meriño	February 11, 2005 (aged 19)	9	1	(Royal Spanish Football Federation) Alicante City
10	MF	Cyrelle Saut	September 3, 2005 (aged 19)	12	1	(Philippine Football Federation) Tuloy
11	MF	Jhon Diaz	October 24, 2006 (aged 17)	5	0	(Philippine Football Federation) Tuloy
18	MF	Manolo Veneracion	March 14, 2005 (aged 19)	4	0	(Football Australia) Sorrento
19	MF	Sylver Pormento	March 18, 2005 (aged 19)	5	0	(Philippine Football Federation) Tuloy
20	MF	Yuan Maniscan	October 1, 2005 (aged 18)	4	0	(Philippine Football Federation) University of Santo Tomas
22	MF	Bryan Bandara	May 10, 2006 (aged 18)	2	0	(Portuguese Football Federation) Mirandela
7	FW	Otu Bisong	November 11, 2006 (aged 17)	6	3	(United States Soccer Federation) D.C. United
12	FW	Ethan Smith	July 2, 2006 (aged 18)	2	0	(The Football Association) Notts County
13	FW	Trez Mariñas	January 31, 2005 (aged 19)	3	1	(Philippine Football Federation) University of Santo Tomas
23	FW	Levis Sajor	February 2, 2005 (aged 19)	3	0	(Philippine Football Federation) Tuloy
24	FW	Rocket Ritarita	April 16, 2007 (aged 17)	0	0	(United States Soccer Federation) Charlotte FC

=== Recent call-ups ===
The following players have been called up for the team for the last 12 months.

Pos.	Player	Date of birth (age)	Caps	Goals	Club	Latest call-up

== Competitive records ==
=== FIFA U-20 World Cup ===
The Philippines' FIFA U-20 World Cup Record
Year	Round	Position	GP	W	D	L	GS	GA
(Tunisia) 1977	Did not qualify							
(Japan) 1979	Did not qualify							
(Australia) 1981	Did not qualify							
(Mexico) 1983	Did not qualify							
(Soviet Union) 1985	Did not qualify							
(Chile) 1987	Did not qualify							
(Saudi Arabia) 1989	Did not qualify							
(Portugal) 1991	Did not qualify							
(Australia) 1993	Did not qualify							
(Qatar) 1995	Did not qualify							
(Malaysia) 1997	Did not qualify							
(Nigeria) 1999	Did not qualify							
(Argentina) 2001	Did not qualify							
(United Arab Emirates) 2003	Did not qualify							
(Netherlands) 2005	Did not qualify							
(Canada) 2007	Did not qualify							
(Egypt) 2009	Did not qualify							
(Colombia) 2011	Did not qualify							
(Turkey) 2013	Did not qualify							
(New Zealand) 2015	Did not qualify							
(South Korea) 2017	Did not qualify							
(Poland) 2019	Did not qualify							
(Indonesia) 2021	Cancelled due to COVID-19 Pandemic							
(Indonesia) 2023	Did not qualify							
(Chile) 2025	Did not qualify							
(Azerbaijan) (Uzbekistan) 2027	Withdrew							
(Armenia) (Georgia (country)) 2029	Disqualified							
2031	Did not enter							
2033	To be determined							

=== AFC U-20 Asian Cup ===
The Philippines' AFC U-20 Asian Cup
Year	Round	Position	GP	W	D	L	GS	GA
(Malaysia) 1959	Round 1	9th Place	5	0	1	4	6	20
(Malaysia) 1960	Round 1	7th Place	3	0	1	2	3	18
(Thailand) 1961	Did not qualify							
(Thailand) 1962	Did not qualify							
(Malaysia) 1963	Round 1	12th Place	5	0	0	5	3	22
(South Vietnam) 1964	Did not qualify							
(Japan) 1965	Round 1	10th Place	4	0	0	4	2	24
(Philippines) 1966	Round 1	9th Place	3	0	0	3	0	8
(Thailand) 1967	Round 1	13th Place	2	0	0	2	2	10
(South Korea) 1968	Round 2	5th Place	5	1	0	4	5	12
(Thailand) 1969	Round 1	15th Place	3	0	0	3	1	12
(Philippines) 1970	Round 1	9th Place	3	1	1	1	4	5
(Japan) 1971	Round 1	11th Place	3	1	0	2	1	9
(Thailand) 1972	Round 1	15th Place	3	0	0	3	1	10
(Iran) 1973	Did not qualify							
(Thailand) 1974	Round 1	15th Place	3	0	0	3	0	7
(Kuwait) 1975	Round 1	11th Place	4	2	0	2	4	4
(Thailand) 1976	Withdrew							
(Iran) 1977	Withdrew							
(Bangladesh) 1978	Withdrew							
(Thailand) 1980	Did not qualify							
(Thailand) 1982	Did not qualify							
(United Arab Emirates) 1985	Did not qualify							
(Saudi Arabia) 1986	Did not qualify							
(Qatar) 1988	Did not qualify							
(Indonesia) 1990	Did not qualify							
(United Arab Emirates) 1992	Did not qualify							
(Indonesia) 1994	Did not qualify							
(South Korea) 1996	Did not qualify							
(Thailand) 1998	Did not qualify							
(Iran) 2000	Did not qualify							
(Qatar) 2002	Did not qualify							
(Malaysia) 2004	Did not qualify							
(India) 2006	Did not enter							
(Saudi Arabia) 2008	Did not enter							
(China) 2010	Did not qualify							
(United Arab Emirates) 2012	Did not enter							
(Myanmar) 2014	Did not qualify							
(Bahrain) 2016	Did not qualify							
(Indonesia) 2018	Did not qualify							
(Uzbekistan) 2020	Cancelled due to COVID-19 Pandemic							
(Uzbekistan) 2023	Did not qualify							
(China) 2025	Did not qualify							
(China) 2027	Withdrew							
(China) 2029	Disqualified							
2031	Did not enter							
2033	To be determined							
Total		13/42	46	5	3	38	32	161
Notes:
**Red border colour indicates tournament was held on home soil.

=== ASEAN U-19 Boys Championship ===
The Philippines' ASEAN U-19 Boys Championship Record
Year	Round	Position	GP	W	D	L	GS	GA
(Thailand) (Cambodia) 2002	Group stage	8th Place	4	1	0	3	1	11
(Myanmar) (Vietnam) 2003	Group stage	9th Place	4	0	0	4	1	16
(Indonesia) 2005	Withdrew							
(Malaysia) 2006	Withdrew							
(Vietnam) 2007	Withdrew							
(Thailand) 2008	Withdrew							
(Vietnam) 2009	Withdrew							
(Vietnam) 2010	Withdrew							
(Myanmar) 2011	Group stage	9th Place	4	0	1	3	4	17
(Vietnam) 2012	Withdrew							
(Indonesia) 2013	Group stage	9th Place	4	0	0	4	4	12
(Vietnam) 2014	Withdrew							
(Laos) 2015	Group stage	7th Place	4	1	0	3	4	9
(Vietnam) 2016	Group stage	11th Place	4	0	0	4	5	15
(Myanmar) 2017	Group stage	10th Place	4	0	0	4	2	24
(Indonesia) 2018	Group stage	9th Place	5	1	0	4	5	22
(Vietnam) 2019	Group stage	10th Place	5	1	0	4	8	18
(Indonesia) 2022	Group stage	9th Place	5	1	0	4	8	13
(Indonesia) 2024	Group stage	9th Place	3	1	0	2	2	7
(Indonesia) 2026	Group stage	TBD	2	0	0	2	0	13
Total		12/19	52	6	1	41	44	177
Notes:
Football at the AFF Youth Championship was an under-20 tournament in 2002 to 2007.

== See also ==
- Azkals Development Academy
- Football in the Philippines
- Philippines national football team
- Philippines national under-23 football team
- Philippines national under-21 football team
- Philippines national under-17 football team
- Philippines women's national football team
- Philippines women's national under-20 football team
- Philippines Football League
