= 2018 COTIF Tournament =

2018 L'Alcúdia International Football Tournament
Tournament details
- Host country: Spain
- Dates: 28 July 2018 – 8 August 2018
- Teams: 10 (from 4 confederations)
- Venue: 1 (in 1 host city)

Final positions
- Champions: Argentina (2nd title)
- Runners-up: Russia
- Third place: Uruguay
- Fourth place: Venezuela

Tournament statistics
- Matches played: 23
- Goals scored: 58 (2.52 per match)

The 2018 L'Alcúdia International Football Tournament was a football competition that took place in July and August 2018. The 2018 edition was the third to feature only international youth teams. Previous editions have contained a mix of national selections and club selections.

== Teams ==
The participating teams were:

- Argentina
- India
- Mauritania
- Morocco
- Murcia
- Qatar
- Russia
- Uruguay
- Valenciana
- Venezuela

== Group stage ==
=== Group A ===
Pos	Team	Pld	W	D	L	GF	GA	GD	Pts	Qualification
1	Argentina	4	3	0	1	9	2	+7	9	Semi-finals
2	Venezuela	4	2	1	1	5	5	0	7	Semi-finals
3	Mauritania	4	1	1	2	5	5	0	4	
4	Murcia (H)	4	1	1	2	3	6	−3	4	
5	India	4	1	1	2	2	6	−4	4	

(H) Hosts
29 July 2018
13:00 CEST

India	0–2	Murcia
	Report

Estadi Municipal Els Arcs, Alcúdia
29 July 2018
17:15 CEST

Venezuela	0–4	Argentina
	Report

Estadi Municipal Els Arcs, Alcúdia
30 July 2018
15:15 CEST

Mauritania	1–2	Venezuela
	Report

Estadi Municipal Els Arcs, Alcúdia
31 July 2018
13:00 CEST

Mauritania	3–0	India
	Report

Estadi Municipal Els Arcs, Alcúdia
31 July 2018
17:15 CEST

Murcia	0–2	Argentina
	Report

Estadi Municipal Els Arcs, Alcúdia
1 August 2018
17:15 CEST

Venezuela	3–0	Murcia
	Report

Estadi Municipal Els Arcs, Alcúdia
3 August 2018
15:15 CEST

India	0–0	Venezuela
	Report

Estadi Municipal Els Arcs, Alcúdia
3 August 2018
17:15 CEST

Argentina	2–0	Mauritania
	Report

Estadi Municipal Els Arcs, Alcúdia
5 August 2018
15:15 CEST

Murcia	1–1	Mauritania
	Report

Estadi Municipal Els Arcs, Alcúdia
5 August 2018
17:15 CEST

Argentina	1–2	India
	Report

Estadi Municipal Els Arcs, Alcúdia

=== Group B ===
Pos	Team	Pld	W	D	L	GF	GA	GD	Pts	Qualification
1	Russia	4	3	1	0	13	3	+10	10	Semi-finals
2	Uruguay	4	3	1	0	6	2	+4	10	Semi-finals
3	Morocco	4	1	1	2	6	7	−1	4	
4	Qatar	4	1	0	3	2	6	−4	3	
5	Valenciana (H)	4	0	1	3	1	10	−9	1	

(H) Hosts
28 July 2018
16:30 CEST

Qatar	1–0	Valenciana
	Report

Estadi Municipal Els Arcs, Alcúdia
29 July 2018
15:15 CEST

Morocco	3–4	Russia
	Report

Estadi Municipal Els Arcs, Alcúdia
30 July 2018
13:00 CEST

Qatar	0–1	Uruguay
	Report

Estadi Municipal Els Arcs, Alcúdia
30 July 2018
17:15 CEST

Russia	6–0	Valenciana
	Report

Estadi Municipal Els Arcs, Alcúdia
31 July 2018
15:15 CEST

Morocco	2–1	Qatar
	Report

Estadi Municipal Els Arcs, Alcúdia
1 August 2018
15:15 CEST

Uruguay	2–1	Morocco
	Report

Estadi Municipal Els Arcs, Alcúdia
2 August 2018
15:15 CEST

Russia	3–0	Qatar
	Report

Estadi Municipal Els Arcs, Alcúdia
2 August 2018
17:15 CEST

Valenciana	1–3	Uruguay
	Report

Estadi Municipal Els Arcs, Alcúdia
4 August 2018
15:15 CEST

Uruguay	0–0	Russia
	Report

Estadi Municipal Els Arcs, Alcúdia
4 August 2018
17:15 CEST

Valenciana	0–0	Morocco
	Report

Estadi Municipal Els Arcs, Alcúdia

== Knockout stage ==
=== Bracket ===
Semi-finals
6 August – Estadi Municipal Els Arcs
Argentina	0 (3)
Uruguay (p)	0 (1)
6 August – Estadi Municipal Els Arcs
Russia	2
Venezuela	0

Final
8 August – Estadi Municipal Els Arcs
Argentina	2
Russia (a.e.t.)	1

=== Semi-finals ===
6 August 2018
17:15 CEST

Argentina	0–0 (a.e.t.)	Uruguay
	Report
Penalties
	3–1

Estadi Municipal Els Arcs, Alcúdia
6 August 2018
15:15 CEST

Russia	2–0	Venezuela
	Report

Estadi Municipal Els Arcs, Alcúdia

=== Final ===
8 August 2018
16:30 CEST

Argentina	2–1 (a.e.t.)	Russia
	Report

Estadi Municipal Els Arcs, Alcúdia
