= North Korea national under-20 football team =

National association football team

North Korea Under-20
- Association: DPR Korea Football Association
- Confederation: AFC (Asia)
- Head coach: (North Korea) Jon Chol
- FIFA code: PRK
| First colours | Second colours |

The North Korea national under-20 football team is the youth association football team representing North Korea in youth competitions and it is controlled by DPR Korea Football Association.

== Participation in tournaments ==
=== FIFA U-20 World Cup ===
| Year | Result | Pld | W | D | L | GF | GA |
|---|---|---|---|---|---|---|---|
| (Tunisia) 1977 | did not participate | | | | | | |
| (Japan) 1979 | did not qualify | | | | | | |
| (Australia) 1981 | did not participate | | | | | | |
| (Mexico) 1983 | Banned | | | | | | |
| (Soviet Union) 1985 | did not participate | | | | | | |
| (Chile) 1987 | did not qualify | | | | | | |
| (Saudi Arabia) 1989 | did not qualify | | | | | | |
| (Portugal) 1991 | Participated as Korea unified team. | | | | | | |
| (Portugal) 1991 | Quarterfinals | 4 | 1 | 1 | 2 | 3 | 7 |
| (Australia) 1993 | did not participate | | | | | | |
| (Qatar) 1995 | did not participate | | | | | | |
| (Malaysia) 1997 | did not participate | | | | | | |
| (Nigeria) 1999 | did not qualify | | | | | | |
| (Argentina) 2001 | did not participate | | | | | | |
| (United Arab Emirates) 2003 | Withdrew | | | | | | |
| (Netherlands) 2005 | Withdrew | | | | | | |
| (Canada) 2007 | Round 1 | 3 | 0 | 2 | 1 | 2 | 3 |
| (Egypt) 2009 | did not qualify | | | | | | |
| (Colombia) 2011 | Round 1 | 3 | 0 | 1 | 2 | 0 | 6 |
| (Turkey) 2013 | did not qualify | | | | | | |
| (New Zealand) 2015 | Round 1 | 3 | 0 | 0 | 3 | 1 | 12 |
| (South Korea) 2017 | did not qualify | | | | | | |
| (Poland) 2019 | did not qualify | | | | | | |
| (Argentina) 2023 | did not participate | | | | | | |
| (Chile) 2025 | did not qualify | | | | | | |
| (Azerbaijan) (Uzbekistan) 2027 | To be determined | | | | | | |
| (Armenia) (Georgia (country)) 2029 | To be determined | | | | | | |
| Total | 3/26 | 9 | 0 | 3 | 6 | 3 | 21 |
| Incl. 1991 | 4/26 | 13 | 1 | 4 | 8 | 6 | 28 |

=== AFC U-20 Asian Cup ===
| Year | Result | Position | Pld | W | D | L | GF | GA |
|---|---|---|---|---|---|---|---|---|
| (Kuwait) 1975 | Semi-finals | 3rd | 7 | 4 | 1 | 2 | 9 | 6 |
| (Thailand) 1976 | Champions | 1st | 7 | 2 | 4 | 1 | 6 | 4 |
| (Bangladesh) 1978 | Semi-finals | 3rd | 7 | 4 | 3 | 0 | 13 | 2 |
| (Saudi Arabia) 1986 | Semi-finals | 3rd | 5 | 3 | 0 | 2 | 5 | 3 |
| (Qatar) 1988 | Group stage | 6th | 3 | 1 | 0 | 2 | 4 | 7 |
| (Indonesia) 1990 | Runner-up | 2nd | 5 | 3 | 1 | 1 | 11 | 4 |
| (India) 2006 | Champions | 1st | 6 | 4 | 1 | 1 | 10 | 3 |
| (Saudi Arabia) 2008 | Quarter-finals | 8th | 4 | 1 | 2 | 1 | 6 | 3 |
| (China) 2010 | Champions | 1st | 6 | 5 | 0 | 1 | 12 | 3 |
| (United Arab Emirates) 2012 | Group stage | 9th | 3 | 1 | 1 | 1 | 6 | 3 |
| (Myanmar) 2014 | Runners-up | 2nd | 6 | 2 | 2 | 2 | 10 | 7 |
| (Bahrain) 2016 | Group stage | 16th | 3 | 0 | 0 | 3 | 2 | 9 |
| (Indonesia) 2018 | Group stage | 12th | 3 | 1 | 0 | 2 | 4 | 7 |
| (Uzbekistan) 2023 | did not participate | | | | | | | |
| (China) 2025 | Group stage | 12th | 3 | 0 | 1 | 2 | 3 | 5 |
| Total | 2 titles | 14/42 | 68 | 31 | 16 | 21 | 101 | 66 |

== Current squad ==
The following players were called up to the squad for the 2027 AFC U-20 Asian Cup qualification.

| No. | Pos. | Player | Date of birth (age) | Club |
|---|---|---|---|---|
| 1 | GK | Kim Jong-hun | 19 May 2008 (age 18) | (DPR Korea Football Association) Rimyongsu |
| 18 | GK | Min Chol-gyong | 3 June 2008 (age 18) | (DPR Korea Football Association) Hwaebul |
| 23 | GK | Jon Yong-un | 18 November 2009 (age 17) | (DPR Korea Football Association) April 25 |
| 2 | DF | Ri Kyong-bong | 30 April 2008 (age 18) | (DPR Korea Football Association) April 25 |
| 4 | DF | Sung Hak-myong | 1 February 2007 (age 19) | (DPR Korea Football Association) Hwaebul |
| 14 | DF | Han Il-bok | 30 August 2008 (age 18) | (DPR Korea Football Association) Kigwancha |
| 15 | DF | Kim Se-ung | 1 July 2008 (age 18) | (DPR Korea Football Association) Ryomyong |
| 16 | DF | Jong Un-hyok | 6 January 2007 (age 19) | (DPR Korea Football Association) Wolmido |
| 22 | DF | Pak Ryong-u | 16 November 2008 (age 18) | (DPR Korea Football Association) Wolmido |
| 3 | MF | Choe Chung-hyok | 30 January 2008 (age 18) | (DPR Korea Football Association) April 25 |
| 6 | MF | An Jin-sok | 29 October 2008 (age 18) | (DPR Korea Football Association) Ryomyong |
| 9 | MF | Pak Kwang-song | 9 March 2008 (age 18) | (DPR Korea Football Association) April 25 |
| 12 | MF | Cha Kwang-song | | (DPR Korea Football Association) Unknown |
| 17 | MF | Ri Hyok-gwang | 21 September 2008 (age 18) | (DPR Korea Football Association) Ryomyong |
| 20 | MF | Kim Hyon-jun | 4 January 2007 (age 19) | (DPR Korea Football Association) Kigwancha |
| 5 | FW | Kang Myong-bom | 17 March 2008 (age 18) | (DPR Korea Football Association) Ryomyong |
| 7 | FW | Ho Myong-ryong | 6 January 2007 (age 19) | (DPR Korea Football Association) Kigwancha |
| 8 | FW | So Jin-song | 6 January 2007 (age 19) | (DPR Korea Football Association) Sobaeksu |
| 10 | FW | Kim Yu-jin | 2 April 2008 (age 18) | (DPR Korea Football Association) April 25 |
| 11 | FW | Ri Kang-rim | 22 March 2008 (age 18) | (DPR Korea Football Association) Ryomyong |
| 13 | FW | Kang Wi-song | | (DPR Korea Football Association) Unknown |
| 19 | FW | Paek Kwang-nam | | (DPR Korea Football Association) Unknown |
| 21 | FW | Pak Nam | | (DPR Korea Football Association) Unknown |

== Head-to-head record ==
The following table shows North Korea's head-to-head record in the FIFA U-20 World Cup and AFC U-20 Asian Cup.

=== In FIFA U-20 World Cup ===
| Opponent | Pld | W | D | L | GF | GA | GD | Win % |
|---|---|---|---|---|---|---|---|---|
| Argentina | 2 | 0 | 0 | 2 | 0 | 4 | −4 | 0.00 |
| Brazil | 1 | 0 | 0 | 1 | 0 | 3 | −3 | 0.00 |
| Czech Republic | 1 | 0 | 1 | 0 | 2 | 2 | +0 | 0.00 |
| England | 1 | 0 | 1 | 0 | 0 | 0 | +0 | 0.00 |
| Hungary | 1 | 0 | 0 | 1 | 1 | 5 | −4 | 0.00 |
| Mexico | 1 | 0 | 0 | 1 | 0 | 3 | −3 | 0.00 |
| Nigeria | 1 | 0 | 0 | 1 | 0 | 4 | −4 | 0.00 |
| Panama | 1 | 0 | 1 | 0 | 0 | 0 | +0 | 0.00 |
| Total | 9 | 0 | 3 | 6 | 3 | 21 | −18 | 0.00 |

=== In AFC U-20 Asian Cup ===
| Opponent | Pld | W | D | L | GF | GA | GD | Win % |
|---|---|---|---|---|---|---|---|---|
| Australia | 2 | 1 | 0 | 1 | 4 | 4 | +0 | 50.00 |
| Bahrain | 2 | 1 | 0 | 1 | 2 | 1 | +1 | 50.00 |
| China | 4 | 3 | 1 | 0 | 6 | 1 | +5 | 75.00 |
| India | 3 | 2 | 0 | 1 | 7 | 3 | +4 | 66.67 |
| Indonesia | 2 | 2 | 0 | 0 | 7 | 1 | +6 | 100.00 |
| Iran | 2 | 1 | 1 | 0 | 5 | 0 | +5 | 50.00 |
| Iraq | 8 | 4 | 2 | 2 | 10 | 8 | +2 | 50.00 |
| Japan | 7 | 1 | 3 | 3 | 7 | 11 | −4 | 14.29 |
| Jordan | 3 | 1 | 1 | 1 | 3 | 3 | +0 | 33.33 |
| Kuwait | 2 | 0 | 2 | 0 | 3 | 3 | +0 | 0.00 |
| Lebanon | 1 | 1 | 0 | 0 | 4 | 0 | +4 | 100.00 |
| Malaysia | 1 | 1 | 0 | 0 | 2 | 0 | +2 | 100.00 |
| Myanmar | 1 | 1 | 0 | 0 | 2 | 1 | +1 | 100.00 |
| Oman | 1 | 0 | 1 | 0 | 1 | 1 | +0 | 0.00 |
| Qatar | 5 | 1 | 0 | 4 | 3 | 9 | −6 | 20.00 |
| Saudi Arabia | 3 | 0 | 1 | 2 | 2 | 5 | −3 | 0.00 |
| South Korea | 5 | 3 | 2 | 0 | 4 | 0 | +4 | 60.00 |
| South Yemen | 1 | 1 | 0 | 0 | 1 | 0 | +1 | 100.00 |
| Sri Lanka | 2 | 2 | 0 | 0 | 8 | 0 | +8 | 100.00 |
| Syria | 2 | 1 | 0 | 1 | 2 | 3 | −1 | 50.00 |
| Tajikistan | 2 | 1 | 1 | 0 | 2 | 1 | +1 | 50.00 |
| Thailand | 3 | 1 | 1 | 1 | 4 | 3 | +1 | 33.33 |
| United Arab Emirates | 1 | 0 | 0 | 1 | 1 | 3 | −2 | 0.00 |
| Uzbekistan | 3 | 1 | 0 | 2 | 5 | 3 | +2 | 33.33 |
| Vietnam | 2 | 1 | 0 | 1 | 6 | 2 | +4 | 50.00 |
| Total | 68 | 31 | 16 | 21 | 101 | 66 | +35 | 45.59 |

== See also ==
- North Korea national football team
- North Korea national under-23 football team
- North Korea women's national football team
