= 1975 AFC Youth Championship =

Tournament details
- Host country: Kuwait
- Dates: 4–20 April
- Teams: 19

The 1975 AFC Youth Championship was held in Kuwait.

== Teams ==
The following teams entered the tournament:

- Afghanistan
- Bahrain
- Bangladesh
- Brunei
- Burma
- China
- Hong Kong
- India
- Indonesia
- Iran
- Iraq
- Japan
- Kuwait (host)
- Malaysia
- North Korea
- Philippines
- Singapore
- South Yemen
- Syria

Note: Sri Lanka withdrew before the draw.

== Group stage ==
=== Group A ===
Teams	Pld	W	D	L	GF	GA	GD	Pts
Iran	3	3	0	0	14	1	+13	6
Iraq	3	2	0	1	15	2	+13	4
Indonesia	3	1	0	2	2	7	–5	2
Brunei	3	0	0	3	1	22	–21	0

6 April	Iraq	10–0	Brunei
	Iran	2–0	Indonesia
8 April	Iran	10–0	Brunei
	Iraq	4–0	Indonesia
10 April	Indonesia	2–1	Brunei
12 April	Iraq	1–2	Iran

=== Group B ===
Teams	Pld	W	D	L	GF	GA	GD	Pts
Bahrain	4	4	0	0	6	0	+6	8
Hong Kong	4	2	0	2	5	4	+1	4
Syria	4	2	0	2	4	4	0	4
Philippines	4	2	0	2	4	4	0	4
Bangladesh	4	0	0	4	2	9	–7	0

4 April	Hong Kong	0–1	Bahrain
5 April	Bangladesh	0–2	Philippines
7 April	Bahrain	2–0	Philippines
	Syria	0–1	Hong Kong
9 April	Bahrain	1–0	Bangladesh
	Philippines	0–1	Syria
11 April	Syria	3–1	Bangladesh
	Philippines	2–1	Hong Kong
13 April	Bahrain	2–0	Syria
	Hong Kong	3–1	Bangladesh

=== Group C ===
Teams	Pld	W	D	L	GF	GA	GD	Pts
Kuwait	4	3	1	0	10	0	+10	7
China	4	2	2	0	6	2	+4	6
Japan	4	2	0	2	10	5	+5	4
Singapore	4	1	0	3	1	11	–10	2
Afghanistan	4	0	1	3	3	12	–9	1

4 April	Kuwait	0–0	China
	Japan	4–0	Singapore
6 April	Kuwait	3–0	Japan
	Afghanistan	2–2	China
8 April	Kuwait	4–0	Singapore
	Japan	6–1	Afghanistan
10 April	Singapore	1–0	Afghanistan
	Japan	0–1	China
12 April	China	3–0	Singapore
	Kuwait	3–0	Afghanistan

=== Group D ===
Teams	Pld	W	D	L	GF	GA	GD	Pts
North Korea	4	3	0	1	6	3	+3	6
South Yemen	4	2	1	1	7	5	+2	5
Burma	4	1	2	1	4	4	0	4
India	4	1	1	2	5	6	–1	3
Malaysia	4	0	2	2	3	7	–4	2

5 April	North Korea	2–1	Burma
	India	1–1	Malaysia
7 April	India	1–2	South Yemen
	Burma	0–0	Malaysia
9 April	Malaysia	0–2	North Korea
	Burma	1–1	South Yemen
11 April	North Korea	1–0	South Yemen
	India	1–2	Burma
13 April	North Korea	1–2	India
	South Yemen	4–2	Malaysia

== Quarterfinals ==
15 April 1975

Iran	2 – 0	Hong Kong

15 April 1975

Bahrain	0 – 2	Iraq

16 April 1975

Kuwait	3 – 0	South Yemen

16 April 1975

North Korea	1 – 0	China

== Semifinals ==
18 April 1975

Iran	0 – 0	Kuwait
Penalties
	3 – 1

18 April 1975

North Korea	0 – 1	Iraq

== Third place match ==
20 April 1975

Kuwait	2 – 2 third place shared	North Korea

== Final ==
20 April 1975

Iran	0 – 0 title shared	Iraq

1975 AFC Youth Championship

Iraq
First title

1975 AFC Youth Championship

Iran
Third title
