= 1966 AFC Youth Championship =

Tournament details
- Host country: Philippines
- Dates: 30 April – 15 May
- Teams: 12 (from 1 confederation)
- Venue: 1 (in 1 host city)

Final positions
- Champions: Israel (3rd title); Burma (4th title) (Title shared)
- Third place: Taiwan; Thailand (Shared)

Tournament statistics
- Matches played: 28
- Goals scored: 95 (3.39 per match)

The 1966 AFC Youth Championship was held in Manila, Philippines from 30 April to 15 May 1966.

== Teams ==
- Burma
- Ceylon
- Taiwan
- Hong Kong
- India
- Israel
- Japan
- South Korea
- Malaysia
- Philippines
- Singapore
- Thailand

== Tournament ==
=== Group stage ===
==== Group A ====
Team	Pld	W	D	L	GF	GA	GD	Pts
Thailand	3	2	1	0	8	1	+7	5
Malaysia	3	2	1	0	8	2	+6	5
Ceylon	3	1	0	2	4	9	−5	2
Philippines	3	0	0	3	0	8	−8	0

30 April 1966

Philippines	0 – 3	Malaysia

Rizal Memorial Stadium, Manila

2 May 1966

Malaysia	4 – 1	Ceylon

Rizal Memorial Stadium, Manila

3 May 1966

Philippines	0 – 2	Thailand

Rizal Memorial Stadium, Manila

5 May 1966

Thailand	5 – 0	Ceylon

Rizal Memorial Stadium, Manila

7 May 1966

Malaysia	1 – 1	Thailand

Rizal Memorial Stadium, Manila
7 May 1966

Philippines	0 – 3	Ceylon

Rizal Memorial Stadium, Manila

==== Group B ====
Team	Pld	W	D	L	GF	GA	GD	Pts
Burma	4	3	0	1	18	3	+15	6
India	4	3	0	1	9	3	+6	6
Taiwan	4	2	1	1	5	7	−2	5
Singapore	4	1	1	2	5	13	−8	3
Japan	4	0	0	4	2	13	−11	0

30 April 1966

Burma	8 – 0	Singapore

Rizal Memorial Stadium, Manila

1 May 1966

Japan	1 – 2	Taiwan

Rizal Memorial Stadium, Manila

2 May 1966

India	2 – 0	Burma

Rizal Memorial Stadium, Manila

3 May 1966

Singapore	0 – 0	Taiwan

Rizal Memorial Stadium, Manila

4 May 1966

India	2 – 0	Japan

Rizal Memorial Stadium, Manila

5 May 1966

Singapore	4 – 1	Japan

Rizal Memorial Stadium, Manila

6 May 1966

Burma	5 – 1	Taiwan

Rizal Memorial Stadium, Manila

7 May 1966

India	4 – 1	Singapore

Rizal Memorial Stadium, Manila

8 May 1966

Burma	5 – 0	Japan

Rizal Memorial Stadium, Manila
8 May 1966

Taiwan	2 – 1	India

Rizal Memorial Stadium, Manila

==== Group C ====
Team	Pld	W	D	L	GF	GA	GD	Pts
Israel	2	1	1	0	6	1	+5	3
South Korea	2	1	1	0	5	1	+4	3
Hong Kong	2	0	0	2	2	11	−9	0

1 May 1966

Israel	0 – 0	South Korea

Rizal Memorial Stadium, Manila
4 May 1966

Israel	6 – 1	Hong Kong

Rizal Memorial Stadium, Manila
6 May 1966

South Korea	5 – 1	Hong Kong

Rizal Memorial Stadium, Manila

=== Quarter-final berth play-off ===
9 May 1966

Hong Kong	5 – 2	Ceylon

Rizal Memorial Stadium, Manila

=== Knockout stage ===
==== Quarter-finals ====
10 May 1966

Burma	1 – 0	Malaysia

Rizal Memorial Stadium, Manila
10 May 1966

Thailand	1 – 0	South Korea

Rizal Memorial Stadium, Manila

11 May 1966

Israel	4 – 0	India

Rizal Memorial Stadium, Manila
11 May 1966

Taiwan	1 – 1 (Note: China progressed by coin toss.)	Hong Kong

Rizal Memorial Stadium, Manila

==== Semi-finals ====
13 May 1966

Burma	3 – 0	Thailand

Rizal Memorial Stadium, Manila
13 May 1966

Israel	5 – 0	Taiwan

Rizal Memorial Stadium, Manila

==== Third place play-off ====
15 May 1966

Taiwan	0 – 0 Third place shared	Thailand

Rizal Memorial Stadium, Manila

==== Final ====
15 May 1966

Israel	1 – 1 Title shared	Burma

Rizal Memorial Stadium, Manila

1966 AFC Youth Championship

Burma
Fourth title

1966 AFC Youth Championship

Israel
Third title
