= 1986 AFC Youth Championship =

Tournament details
- Host country: Saudi Arabia
- Dates: 1–10 December
- Teams: 8 (from 1 confederation)
- Venue: 1 (in 1 host city)

Final positions
- Champions: Saudi Arabia (1st title)
- Runners-up: Bahrain
- Third place: North Korea
- Fourth place: Qatar

Tournament statistics
- Matches played: 16
- Goals scored: 52 (3.25 per match)

The 1986 AFC Youth Championship was held from 1 to 10 December 1986 in Riyadh, Saudi Arabia. The tournament was won for the first time by Saudi Arabia in the finals against Bahrain.

== Qualification ==
=== Qualified teams ===
- Saudi Arabia (Group 1 winners / hosts)
- Bahrain (Group 2 winners)
- Qatar (Group 3 winners)
- Sri Lanka (Group 4 winners)
- India (Group 5 winners)
- North Korea (Group 6 winners)
- Indonesia (Group 7 winners)
- South Korea (Group 8 winners)

== Group stage ==
=== Group A ===
| Team | Pld | W | D | L | GF | GA | GD | Pts |
|---|---|---|---|---|---|---|---|---|
| Saudi Arabia | 3 | 3 | 0 | 0 | 13 | 1 | +12 | 6 |
| Qatar | 3 | 2 | 0 | 1 | 7 | 3 | +4 | 4 |
| India | 3 | 0 | 1 | 2 | 2 | 8 | −6 | 1 |
| Indonesia | 3 | 0 | 1 | 2 | 1 | 11 | −10 | 1 |

1 December 1986

| Qatar | 3 – 0 | Indonesia |

1 December 1986

| Saudi Arabia | 4 – 0 | India |

3 December 1986

| India | 1 – 3 | Qatar |

3 December 1986

| Saudi Arabia | 7 – 0 | Indonesia |

5 December 1986

| India | 1 – 1 | Indonesia |

5 December 1986

| Saudi Arabia | 2 – 1 | Qatar |

=== Group B ===
| Team | Pld | W | D | L | GF | GA | GD | Pts |
|---|---|---|---|---|---|---|---|---|
| Bahrain | 3 | 2 | 1 | 0 | 9 | 1 | +8 | 5 |
| North Korea | 3 | 2 | 0 | 1 | 4 | 1 | +3 | 4 |
| South Korea | 3 | 1 | 1 | 1 | 9 | 2 | +7 | 3 |
| Sri Lanka | 3 | 0 | 0 | 3 | 0 | 18 | −18 | 0 |

2 December 1986

| Bahrain | 1 – 1 | South Korea |

2 December 1986

| Sri Lanka | 0 – 3 | North Korea |

4 December 1986

| North Korea | 0 – 1 | Bahrain |

4 December 1986

| Sri Lanka | 0 – 8 | South Korea |

6 December 1986

| Bahrain | 7 – 0 | Sri Lanka |

6 December 1986

| North Korea | 1 – 0 | South Korea |

== Knockout stage ==
Semi-finals
8 December
Saudi Arabia | 2
North Korea | 0
8 December
Bahrain | 2
Qatar | 0

Final
10 December
Saudi Arabia | 2
Bahrain | 0
Third place
10 December
North Korea | 1
Qatar | 0

=== Semifinal ===
8 December 1986

| Saudi Arabia | 2 – 0 | North Korea |

Riyadh, Saudi Arabia
8 December 1986

| Bahrain | 2 – 0 | Qatar |

Riyadh, Saudi Arabia

=== Third-place match ===
10 December 1986

| North Korea | 1 – 0 | Qatar |

Riyadh, Saudi Arabia

=== Final ===
10 December 1986

| Saudi Arabia | 2 – 0 | Bahrain |

Riyadh, Saudi Arabia

== Winner ==
AFC Youth Championship 1986 winners

Saudi Arabia
First title

- Saudi Arabia, Bahrain qualified for 1987 FIFA World Youth Championship.
