= 1976 AFC Youth Championship =

Tournament details
- Host country: Thailand
- Dates: 20 April – 8 May
- Teams: 15

The 1976 AFC Youth Championship was held in Bangkok, Thailand.

== Teams ==
The following teams entered the tournament:

- Burma
- China
- Hong Kong
- India
- Indonesia
- Iran
- Iraq
- Japan
- Kuwait
- Malaysia
- North Korea
- Singapore
- South Korea
- Sri Lanka
- Thailand (host)

Brunei withdrew.

== Group stage ==
=== Group A ===
Teams	Pld	W	D	L	GF	GA	GD	Pts
Iran	3	3	0	0	5	0	+5	6
South Korea	3	1	1	1	5	2	+3	3
India	3	1	1	1	4	3	+1	3
Malaysia	3	0	0	3	0	9	–9	0

21 April	South Korea	4–0	Malaysia
23 April	Iran	2–0	India
25 April	Iran	2–0	Malaysia
26 April	India	1–1	South Korea
29 April	India	3–0	Malaysia
	Iran	1–0	South Korea

=== Group B ===
Teams	Pld	W	D	L	GF	GA	GD	Pts
Indonesia	3	1	2	0	5	2	+3	4
China	3	1	2	0	7	5	+2	4
Kuwait	3	0	3	0	6	6	0	3
Singapore	3	0	1	2	3	8	–5	1

22 April	China	1–1	Indonesia
	Kuwait	2–2	Singapore
24 April	China	3–1	Singapore
25 April	Indonesia	1–1	Kuwait
27 April	Indonesia	3–0	Singapore
	China	3–3	Kuwait

=== Group C ===
Teams	Pld	W	D	L	GF	GA	GD	Pts
North Korea	2	0	2	0	2	2	0	2
Japan	2	0	2	0	1	1	0	2
Thailand	2	0	2	0	1	1	0	2

20 April	Japan	0–0	Thailand
23 April	Japan	1–1	North Korea
26 April	North Korea	1–1	Thailand

==== Tie-breaker play-off ====
Teams	Pld	W	D	L	GF	GA	GD	Pts
Thailand	2	1	0	1	3	2	+1	2
North Korea	2	1	0	1	2	1	+1	2
Japan	2	1	0	1	1	3	–2	2

28 April	North Korea	0–1	Japan
30 April	Thailand	3–0	Japan
2 May	North Korea	2–0	Thailand

=== Group D ===
Teams	Pld	W	D	L	GF	GA	GD	Pts
Iraq	3	3	0	0	12	0	+12	6
Burma	3	2	0	1	11	3	+8	4
Hong Kong	3	1	0	2	2	11	–9	2
Sri Lanka	3	0	0	3	2	13	–11	0

21 April	Iraq	5–0	Sri Lanka
	Burma	5–0	Hong Kong
24 April	Burma	6–1	Sri Lanka
	Hong Kong	0–5	Iraq
27 April	Hong Kong	2–1	Sri Lanka
28 April	Burma	0–2	Iraq

== Quarterfinals ==
3 May 1976

Iran	3 – 0	China

Bangkok
3 May 1976

South Korea	1 – 0	Indonesia

Bangkok
4 May 1976

Thailand	1 – 0	Burma

Bangkok
4 May 1976

North Korea	1 – 1	Iraq
Penalties
	4 – 2

Bangkok

== Semifinals ==
6 May 1976

Iran	3 – 2	Thailand

Bangkok
6 May 1976

North Korea	1 – 0	South Korea

Bangkok

== Third place match ==
8 May 1976

South Korea	2 – 1	Thailand

Bangkok

== Final ==
8 May 1976

Iran	0 – 0 title shared	North Korea

Bangkok

1976 AFC Youth Championship

Iran
Fourth title

1976 AFC Youth Championship

North Korea
First title
