= 1988 AFC Youth Championship =

Tournament details
- Host country: َQatar
- Dates: 17–28 October
- Teams: 8 (from 1 confederation)
- Venue: 1 (in 1 host city)

Final positions
- Champions: Iraq (4th title)

Tournament statistics
- Matches played: 16
- Goals scored: 39 (2.44 per match)

The 1988 AFC Youth Championship were held between October 17 and October 28 in Doha, capital of Qatar. Eight teams entered the final tournament, playing for the Asian Youth title and a spot at the 1989 FIFA World Youth Championship in Saudi Arabia.

Iraq won the tournament, beating Syria 4–3 after a penalty shootout. Hosts Qatar grabbed the third place.

The Iraqi team qualified for the World Cup Finals, whereas Syria and Qatar had to enter a play-off round against Australia and New Zealand. Syria won the tournament which was hosted in January 1989 in Aleppo.

== Teams ==
- Qatar
- China
- Iraq
- Japan
- South Korea
- North Korea
- Syria
- United Arab Emirates

== Group stage ==
=== Group A ===
Team	Pts	Pld	W	D	L	GF	GA	GD
Syria	6	3	3	0	0	4	0	+4
Qatar	4	3	2	0	1	9	4	+5
North Korea	2	3	1	0	2	4	7	−3
China	0	3	0	0	3	3	9	−6

17 October 1988

China	0 – 1	Syria

17 October 1988

Qatar	4 – 1	North Korea

19 October 1988

North Korea	0 – 2	Syria

19 October 1988

Qatar	5 – 2	China

21 October 1988

Syria	1 – 0	Qatar

21 October 1988

North Korea	3 – 1	China

=== Group B ===
Team	Pts	Pld	W	D	L	GF	GA	GD
Iraq	5	3	2	1	0	3	1	+2
United Arab Emirates	4	3	1	2	0	2	1	+1
South Korea	3	3	1	1	1	3	2	+1
Japan	0	3	0	0	3	3	7	−4

18 October 1988

Japan	1 – 3	South Korea

18 October 1988

Iraq	0 – 0	United Arab Emirates

20 October 1988

Japan	1 – 2	United Arab Emirates

20 October 1988

South Korea	0 – 1	Iraq

22 October 1988

Iraq	2 – 1	Japan

22 October 1988

United Arab Emirates	0 – 0	South Korea

== Semi finals ==
25 October 1988

Iraq	1 – 1 5–4 (PSO)	Qatar

25 October 1988

Syria	2 – 0	United Arab Emirates

== Third place play-off ==
27 October 1988

Qatar	2 – 0	United Arab Emirates

== Final ==
28 October 1988

Iraq	1 – 1 5–4 (PSO)	Syria

== Qualification to World Youth Championship ==
The following teams qualified for the 1989 FIFA World Youth Championship.

- Iraq
- Syria
- Saudi Arabia (host)
