= 1994 AFC Youth Championship =

Tournament details
- Host country: َ Indonesia
- Dates: 11–25 September
- Teams: 10 (from 1 confederation)
- Venue: 1 (in 1 host city)

Final positions
- Champions: Syria (1st title)
- Runners-up: Japan

Tournament statistics
- Matches played: 24
- Goals scored: 70 (2.92 per match)

The 1994 AFC Youth Championship was held from 11 to 25 September 1994, in Jakarta, Indonesia. The tournament was won by for the first time by Syria in the final against Japan.

== Venues ==
Jakarta
Gelora Bung Karno Stadium
Capacity: 110,000
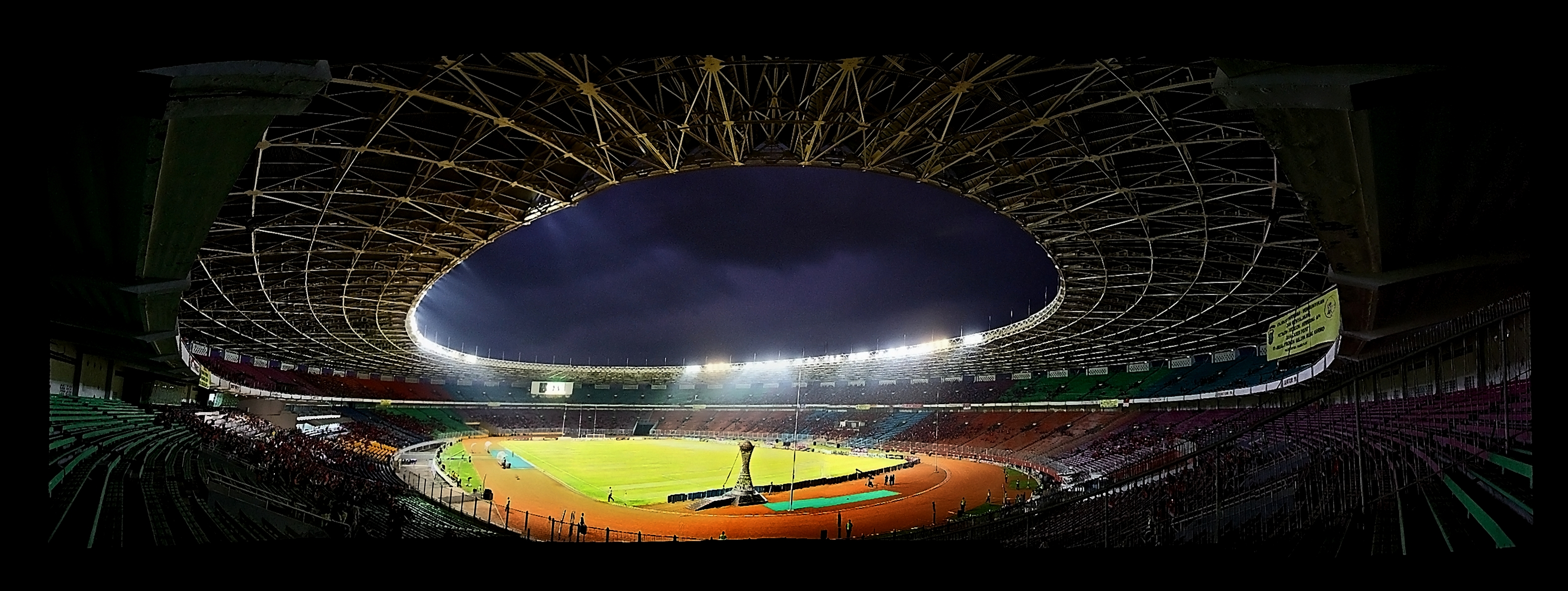
1994 AFC Youth Championship (Indonesia)

== Group stage ==
=== Group A ===
Team	Pld	W	D	L	GF	GA	GD	Pts
Syria	4	3	1	0	13	3	+10	10
Iraq	4	2	1	1	7	4	+3	7
Indonesia	4	1	2	1	4	5	−1	5
Qatar	4	1	2	1	5	7	−2	5
Kazakhstan	4	0	0	4	5	15	−10	0

11 September 1994

Iraq	3–2	Kazakhstan

11 September 1994

Indonesia	1–1	Qatar

13 September 1994

Iraq	1–2	Syria

13 September 1994

Qatar	3–2	Kazakhstan

15 September 1994

Iraq	3–0	Qatar

15 September 1994

Syria	4–0	Indonesia

17 September 1994

Kazakhstan	0–3	Indonesia

17 September 1994

Syria	1–1	Qatar

19 September 1994

Iraq	0–0	Indonesia

19 September 1994

Syria	6–1	Kazakhstan

=== Group B ===
Team	Pld	W	D	L	GF	GA	GD	Pts
Japan	4	3	0	1	5	2	+3	9
Thailand	4	2	1	1	8	4	+4	7
South Korea	4	1	2	1	7	6	+1	5
Bahrain	4	0	3	1	4	6	−2	3
Kuwait	4	0	2	2	3	9	−6	2

12 September 1994

Japan	0–2	Thailand

12 September 1994

Kuwait	1–1	Bahrain

14 September 1994

Bahrain	0–2	Japan

14 September 1994

South Korea	3–1	Thailand

16 September 1994

South Korea	2–2	Kuwait

16 September 1994

Thailand	1–1	Bahrain

18 September 1994

Japan	2–0	Kuwait

18 September 1994

Bahrain	2–2	South Korea

20 September 1994

South Korea	0–1	Japan

20 September 1994

Kuwait	0–4	Thailand

== Knockout stage ==
Semi-finals
23 September
Japan	3
Iraq	0
23 September
Syria	1
Thailand	0

Final
25 September
Syria	2
Japan	1
Third place
25 September
Thailand (pen)	1 (3)
Iraq	1 (2)

=== Semifinal ===
23 September 1994

Japan	3–0	Iraq

Jakarta, Indonesia

23 September 1994

Syria	1–0	Thailand

Jakarta, Indonesia

=== Third-place match ===
25 September 1994

Thailand	1–1 (3 PK 2)	Iraq

Jakarta, Indonesia

=== Final ===
25 September 1994

Syria	2–1	Japan

Gelora Bung Karno Stadium, Jakarta

== Winner ==
1994 AFC Youth Championship winners

Syria
First title

- Syria and Japan qualified for 1995 FIFA World Youth Championship, as well as Qatar, which already qualified as the host.
