= 1990 AFC Youth Championship =

Tournament details
- Host country: َ Indonesia
- Dates: 3–15 November
- Teams: 8 (from 1 confederation)
- Venue: 1 (in 1 host city)

Final positions
- Champions: (South Korea) Korea Republic (7th title)

Tournament statistics
- Matches played: 16
- Goals scored: 40 (2.5 per match)

The 1990 AFC Youth Championship was held in Jakarta, Indonesia in 1990. The tournament was won by for the seventh time by Korea Republic in the final against North Korea.

== Qualification ==
=== Qualified teams ===
- Indonesia (Hosts)
- Bahrain (Group 1 winners)
- Qatar (Group 2 winners)
- Syria (Group 3 winners)
- India (Group 4 winners)
- South Korea (Group 5 winners)
- North Korea (Group 6 winners)
- Japan (Group 7 winners)

== Group stage ==
=== Group A ===
Team	Pld	W	D	L	GF	GA	GD	Pts
Qatar	3	3	0	0	5	1	+4	6
North Korea	3	2	0	1	9	3	+6	4
India	3	1	0	2	3	7	−4	2
Indonesia	3	0	0	3	3	9	−6	0

3 November 1990

India	1–4	North Korea

3 November 1990

Indonesia	1–2	Qatar

6 November 1990

North Korea	5–1	Indonesia

6 November 1990

Qatar	2–0	India

9 November 1990

India	2–1	Indonesia

9 November 1990

North Korea	0–1	Qatar

=== Group B ===
Team	Pld	W	D	L	GF	GA	GD	Pts
Syria	3	1	2	0	7	3	+4	4
South Korea	3	1	2	0	2	1	+1	4
Japan	3	1	1	1	5	4	+1	3
Bahrain	3	0	1	2	1	7	−6	1

4 November 1990

Bahrain	0–4	Syria

4 November 1990

South Korea	1–0	Japan

7 November 1990

Japan	3–1	Bahrain

7 November 1990

Syria	1–1	South Korea

10 November 1990

Japan	2–2	Syria

10 November 1990

South Korea	0–0	Bahrain

== Knockout stage ==
Semi-finals
Qatar	0
South Korea	1
Syria	1
North Korea	2

Final
South Korea (pen)	0 (4)
North Korea	0 (3)
Third place
Syria	1
Qatar	0

=== Semifinal ===
12 November 1990

Qatar	0–1	South Korea

Jakarta, Indonesia

12 November 1990

Syria	1–2	North Korea

Jakarta, Indonesia

=== Third-place match ===
14 November 1990

Syria	1–0	Qatar

Jakarta, Indonesia

=== Final ===
15 November 1990

South Korea	0–0	North Korea
Penalties
	4–3

Jakarta, Indonesia

== Winner ==
AFC Youth Championship 1990 winners

South Korea
Seventh title

- South Korea, North Korea, Syria qualified for 1991 FIFA World Youth Championship. South Korea and North Korea entered as one unified team in the World Cup.
