= 1996 AFC Youth Championship =

Tournament details
- Host country: َ South Korea
- Dates: 17–31 October
- Teams: 10 (from 1 confederation)
- Venues: 2 (in 2 host cities)

Final positions
- Champions: South Korea (8th title)

Tournament statistics
- Matches played: 24
- Goals scored: 75 (3.13 per match)
- Top scorer: (China) Wang Peng (6 goals)
- Best player: (South Korea) Kim Do-kyun

The 1996 AFC Youth Championship was held from 17 to 31 October 1996, in Seoul, South Korea. The tournament was won by for the eighth time by South Korea in the final against China PR.

== Venues ==
Seoul	Suwon
Dongdaemun Stadium	Suwon Sports Complex
Capacity: 22,706	Capacity: 11,808
1996 AFC Youth Championship (South Korea)

== Group stage ==
=== Group A ===
Team	Pld	W	D	L	GF	GA	GD	Pts
South Korea	4	4	0	0	14	3	+11	12
United Arab Emirates	4	2	1	1	9	6	+3	7
Thailand	4	1	1	2	3	7	−4	4
Iran	4	0	3	1	1	2	−1	3
Bangladesh	4	0	1	3	3	12	−9	1

17 October 1996

Bangladesh	1-6	United Arab Emirates

Dongdaemun Stadium, Seoul
17 October 1996

South Korea	4-0	Thailand

Dongdaemun Stadium, Seoul
19 October 1996

Iran	0-0	Thailand

Dongdaemun Stadium, Seoul
19 October 1996

South Korea	3-0	United Arab Emirates

Dongdaemun Stadium, Seoul
21 October 1996

Iran	0-0	Bangladesh

Dongdaemun Stadium, Seoul
21 October 1996

Thailand	2-3	United Arab Emirates

Dongdaemun Stadium, Seoul
23 October 1996

Iran	0-0	United Arab Emirates

Dongdaemun Stadium, Seoul
23 October 1996

South Korea	5-2	Bangladesh

Dongdaemun Stadium, Seoul
25 October 1996

Iran	1-2	South Korea

Dongdaemun Stadium, Seoul
25 October 1996

Thailand	1-0	Bangladesh

Dongdaemun Stadium, Seoul

=== Group B ===
Team	Pld	W	D	L	GF	GA	GD	Pts
China	4	4	0	0	11	5	+6	12
Japan	4	3	0	1	10	3	+7	9
Syria	4	2	0	2	5	5	0	6
India	4	0	1	3	2	6	−4	1
Qatar	4	0	1	3	3	12	−9	1

18 October 1996
India	1 – 1	Qatar	Suwon Sports Complex, Suwon
Syria	1 – 3	Japan	Suwon Sports Complex, Suwon
20 October 1996
China	2 – 1	Japan	Suwon Sports Complex, Suwon
Syria	2 – 0	Qatar	Suwon Sports Complex, Suwon
22 October 1996
China	2 – 1	India	Suwon Sports Complex, Suwon
Japan	4 – 0	Qatar	Suwon Sports Complex, Suwon
24 October 1996
China	5 – 2	Qatar	Suwon Sports Complex, Suwon
Syria	1 – 0	India	Suwon Sports Complex, Suwon
26 October 1996
China	2 – 1	Syria	Suwon Sports Complex, Suwon
Japan	2 – 0	India	Suwon Sports Complex, Suwon

== Knockout stage ==
Semi-finals
29 October - Suwon
South Korea	1
Japan	0
29 October - Suwon
China	5
United Arab Emirates	1

Final
31 October - Seoul
South Korea	3
China	0
Third place
30 October - Seoul
United Arab Emirates (pen)	2 (4)
Japan	2 (3)

=== Semifinal ===
29 October 1996

South Korea	1–0	Japan

Suwon Sports Complex, Suwon

29 October 1996

China	5–1	United Arab Emirates

Suwon Sports Complex, Suwon

=== Third-place match ===
30 October 1996

United Arab Emirates	2 – 2 (4 PK 3)	Japan

Dongdaemun Stadium, Seoul

=== Final ===
31 October 1996

South Korea	3–0	China

Dongdaemun Stadium, Seoul

== Winner ==
AFC Youth Championship 1996 winners

South Korea
Eighth title

- South Korea, China PR, UAE, Japan qualified for 1997 FIFA World Youth Championship.
