= Syria national under-20 football team =

Syria U-20
- Nickname(s): Nosour Qasioun (Arabic: نسور قاسيون, lit. 'The Qasioun Eagles')
- Association: Syrian Football Association
- Confederation: AFC (Asia)
- Sub-confederation: WAFF (West Asia); UAFA (Arab world)
- Head coach: Mohammad Kwid
- FIFA code: SYR
First colours	Second colours

FIFA U-20 World Cup
- Appearances: 4 (first in 1989)
- Best result: Quarter-finals (1991)

AFC U-20 Asian Cup
- Appearances: 10 (first in 1988)
- Best result: Champions (1994)

WAFF U-18 Championship
- Appearances: 3 (first in 2021)
- Best result: Group stage (2021)

The Syria national under-20 football team (Arabic: منتخب سوريا لكرة القدم تحت 20 سنة) is the national youth football team of Syria and is controlled by the Syrian Football Association. It is considered the feeder team for the Syria national football team.

== Results and fixtures ==
=== 2026 ===
31 August 2026 2027 AFC U20 Qualifiers	Syria	0–1	India	Tashkent, Uzbekistan
14:00 EEST		Report	Singamayum 86'	Stadium: Do'stlik Stadium; Referee: Du Jianxin (China)

3 September 2026 2027 AFC U20 Qualifiers	Bangladesh	0–3	Syria	Tashkent, Uzbekistan
14:00 EEST		Report	Alam 44'; Marios 45+1'; Al Najar 90'	Stadium: Do'stlik Stadium

6 September 2026 2027 AFC U20 Qualifiers	Uzbekistan	3–0	Syria	Tashkent, Uzbekistan
17:00 EEST	Ermanov 10'; Kuvonchbek 81'; Tulaganov 90+5' (pen.)	Report		Stadium: Do'stlik Stadium; Referee: Du Jianxin (China)

== Competitive record ==
=== FIFA U-20 World Cup ===
FIFA U-20 World Cup
Year	Round	PLD	W	D*	L	GS	GA
(Tunisia) 1977	Did not enter	-	-	-	-	-	-
(Japan) 1979	Did not enter	-	-	-	-	-	-
(Australia) 1981	Did not enter	-	-	-	-	-	-
(Mexico) 1983	Did not enter	-	-	-	-	-	-
(Soviet Union) 1985	Did not enter	-	-	-	-	-	-
(Chile) 1987	Did not enter	-	-	-	-	-	-
(Saudi Arabia) 1989	Group stage	3	1	0	2	4	6
(Portugal) 1991	Quarter-finals	4	1	3	0	5	4
(Australia) 1993	Did not qualify	-	-	-	-	-	-
(Qatar) 1995	Group stage	3	1	0	2	1	8
(Malaysia) 1997	Did not qualify	-	-	-	-	-	-
(Nigeria) 1999	Did not qualify	-	-	-	-	-	-
(Argentina) 2001	Did not qualify	-	-	-	-	-	-
(United Arab Emirates) 2003	Did not qualify	-	-	-	-	-	-
(Netherlands) 2005	Round of 16	4	1	1	2	3	5
(Canada) 2007	Did not qualify	-	-	-	-	-	-
(Egypt) 2009	Did not qualify	-	-	-	-	-	-
(Colombia) 2011	Did not qualify	-	-	-	-	-	-
(Turkey) 2013	Did not qualify	-	-	-	-	-	-
(New Zealand) 2015	Withdrew	-	-	-	-	-	-
(South Korea) 2017	Did not qualify	-	-	-	-	-	-
(Poland) 2019	Did not qualify	-	-	-	-	-	-
(Argentina) 2023	Did not qualify	-	-	-	-	-	-
(Chile) 2025	Did not qualify	-	-	-	-	-	-
(Azerbaijan) (Uzbekistan) 2027	Did not qualify	-	-	-	-	-	-
(Armenia) (Georgia (country)) 2029	To be determined	-	-	-	-	-	-
Total		14	4	4	6	13	23

FIFA U-20 World Cup History
Year	Round	Score	Result
1989	Round 1	Syria 1 – 3 Soviet Union	Lost
1989	Round 1	Syria 0 – 2 Colombia	Lost
1989	Round 1	Syria 3 – 1 Costa Rica	Won
1991	Round 1	Syria 1 – 0 Uruguay	Won
1991	Round 1	Syria 3 – 3 England	Draw
1991	Round 1	Syria 0 – 0 Spain	Draw
1991	Quarter finals	Syria 1 (4) – 1 (5) Australia	Lost
1995	Round 1	Syria 0 – 6 Brazil	Lost
1995	Round 1	Syria 1 – 0 Qatar	Won
1995	Round 1	Syria 0 – 2 Russia	Lost
2005	Round 1	Syria 1 – 1 Canada	Draw
2005	Round 1	Syria 2 – 1 Italy	Won
2005	Round 1	Syria 0 – 2 Colombia	Lost
2005	Round of 16	Syria 0 – 1 Brazil	Lost

=== AFC U-20 Asian Cup ===
Year	Result	Pld	W	D	L	GF	GA
(Kuwait) 1975	Round 1	4	2	0	2	4	4
(Qatar) 1988	Runner-up	5	4	1	0	7	1
(Indonesia) 1990	3rd Place	5	2	2	1	9	5
(United Arab Emirates) 1992	Did not qualify	-	-	-	-	-	-
(Indonesia) 1994	Champions	6	5	1	0	16	4
(South Korea) 1996	Round 1	4	2	0	2	5	5
(Thailand) 1998	Did not qualify	-	-	-	-	-	-
(Iran) 2000	Did not qualify	-	-	-	-	-	-
(Qatar) 2002	Quarter-finals	4	2	1	1	9	8
(Malaysia) 2004	4th Place	6	3	1	2	9	5
(India) 2006	Did not qualify	-	-	-	-	-	-
(Saudi Arabia) 2008	Round 1	3	0	0	3	1	5
(China) 2010	Round 1	3	1	0	2	1	3
(United Arab Emirates) 2012	Quarter-finals	4	1	2	1	9	6
(Myanmar) 2014	Withdrew	-	-	-	-	-	-
(Bahrain) 2016	Did not qualify	-	-	-	-	-	-
(Indonesia) 2018	Did not qualify	-	-	-	-	-	-
(Uzbekistan) 2020	Cancelled	-	-	-	-	-	-
(Uzbekistan) 2023	Group stage	3	0	1	2	1	4
(China) 2025	Group stage	3	0	2	1	5	6
(China) 2027	Did not qualify	-	-	-	-	-	-
Total		50	22	11	17	76	55

AFC Youth Championship History
Year	Round	Score	Result
1975
1975	Round 1	Syria 0 – 1 Hong Kong	Lost
1975	Round 1	Syria 1 – 0 Philippines	Won
1975	Round 1	Syria 3 – 1 Bangladesh	Won
1975	Round 1	Syria 0 – 2 Bahrain	Lost
1988
1988	Round 1	Syria 1 – 0 China	Won
1988	Round 1	Syria 2 – 0 North Korea	Won
1988	Round 1	Syria 1 – 0 Qatar	Won
1988	Semi-finals	Syria 2 – 0 United Arab Emirates	Won
1988	Final	Syria 1 (4) – 1 (5) Iraq	Lost
1990
1990	Round 1	Syria 4 – 0 Bahrain	Won
1990	Round 1	Syria 1 – 1 South Korea	Draw
1990	Round 1	Syria 2 – 2 Japan	Draw
1990	Semi-finals	Syria 1 – 2 North Korea	Lost
1990	Third place	Syria 1 – 0 Qatar	Won
1994
1994	Round 1	Syria 2 – 1 Iraq	Won
1994	Round 1	Syria 4 – 0 Indonesia	Won
1994	Round 1	Syria 1 – 1 Qatar	Draw
1994	Round 1	Syria 6 – 1 Kazakhstan	Won
1994	Semi-finals	Syria 1 – 0 Thailand	Won
1994	Final	Syria 2 – 1 Japan	Won
1996
1996	Round 1	Syria 1 – 3 Japan	Lost
1996	Round 1	Syria 2 – 0 Qatar	Won
1996	Round 1	Syria 1 – 0 India	Won
1996	Round 1	Syria 1 – 2 China	Lost
2002
2002	Round 1	Syria 4 – 2 China	Won
2002	Round 1	Syria 1 – 1 United Arab Emirates	Draw
2002	Round 1	Syria 4 – 1 Vietnam	Won
2002	Quarter-finals	Syria 0 – 4 Uzbekistan	Lost
2004
2004	Round 1	Syria 2 – 1 India	Won
2004	Round 1	Syria 4 – 1 Laos	Won
2004	Round 1	Syria 1 – 1 Uzbekistan	Draw
2004	Quarter-finals	Syria 1 – 0 Iraq	Won
2004	Semi-finals	Syria 0 – 1 China	Lost
2004	Third place	Syria 1 (3) – 1 (4) Japan	Lost
2008
2008	Round 1	Syria 0 – 1 South Korea	Lost
2008	Round 1	Syria 1 – 2 Iraq	Lost
2008	Round 1	Syria 0 – 2 United Arab Emirates	Lost
2010
2010	Round 1	Syria 1 – 0 Thailand	Won
2010	Round 1	Syria 0 – 2 China	Lost
2010	Round 1	Syria 0 – 1 Saudi Arabia	Lost
2012
2012	Round 1	Syria 5 – 1 Saudi Arabia	Won
2012	Round 1	Syria 1 – 1 Australia	Draw
2012	Round 1	Syria 1 – 2 Qatar	Lost
2012	Quarter-finals	Syria 2 (0) – (3) 2 Uzbekistan	Lost
2023
2023	Round 1	Syria 0 – 2 Uzbekistan	Lost
2023	Round 1	Syria 0 – 1 Indonesia	Lost
2023	Round 1	Syria 1 – 1 Iraq	Draw

== Head-to-head record ==
The following table shows Syria's head-to-head record in FIFA U-20 World Cup.

Opponent	Pld	W	D	L	GF	GA	GD	Win %
Australia	1	0	1	0	1	1	+0	0.00
Brazil	2	0	0	2	0	7	−7	0.00
Canada	1	0	1	0	1	1	+0	0.00
Colombia	2	0	0	2	0	4	−4	0.00
Costa Rica	1	1	0	0	3	1	+2	100.00
England	1	0	1	0	3	3	+0	0.00
Italy	1	1	0	0	2	1	+1	100.00
Qatar	1	1	0	0	1	0	+1	100.00
Russia	1	0	0	1	0	2	−2	0.00
Soviet Union	1	0	0	1	1	3	−2	0.00
Spain	1	0	1	0	0	0	+0	0.00
Uruguay	1	1	0	0	1	0	+1	100.00
Total	14	4	4	6	13	23	−10	28.57

== Current squad ==
The following 23 players were named in the final squad for the 2025 AFC U-20 Asian Cup on 12 February 2025

No.	Pos.	Player	Date of birth (age)	Club
1	GK	Maksim Sarraf	15 March 2005 (aged 19)	(Uzbekistan Football Association) Andijon
2	DF	Omran Khalouf	3 July 2005 (aged 19)	(United Arab Emirates Football Association) Ajman
3	DF	Nabil Al-Omar	10 January 2006 (aged 19)	(Swedish Football Association) Västerås SK
4	DF	Hasan Al-Mahmoud	5 January 2006 (aged 19)	(Syrian Football Association) Al-Jaish
5	DF	Abdulrahman Al-Arjan	10 January 2006 (aged 19)	(Syrian Football Association) Al-Karameh
6	MF	Ahmad Al-Kalou	1 January 2005 (aged 20)	(Syrian Football Association) Ahli Aleppo
7	MF	Anas Dahhan	31 January 2006 (aged 19)	(Syrian Football Association) Ahli Aleppo
8	FW	Gouriye Jacob	20 November 2008 (aged 16)	(Syrian Football Association) Latakia FC
9	FW	Youshaa Knaj	25 November 2005 (aged 19)	(Hellenic Football Federation) MPAM
10	MF	Ahmad Soufi	15 September 2005 (aged 19)	(Syrian Football Association) Hiteen
11	FW	Majd Ramadan	19 May 2005 (aged 19)	(Slovak Football Association) Petržalka
12	MF	Khaled Al-Hamoush	22 February 2005 (aged 19)	(United Arab Emirates Football Association) Al-Wasl
13	FW	Homam Mahmoud	8 April 2006 (aged 18)	(German Football Association) Jahn Regensburg
14	MF	Mahmoud Al-Omar	15 January 2005 (aged 20)	(Syrian Football Association) Ahli Aleppo
15	DF	Hashem Al-Hammami	5 January 2006 (aged 19)	(Syrian Football Association) Al-Jaish
16	FW	Monir Hassan	9 January 2006 (aged 19)	(German Football Association) Borussia Lindenthal-Hohenlind
17	FW	Kawa Issa	10 January 2006 (aged 19)	(Syrian Football Association) Al-Wahda
18	MF	Saadaldin Al-Khleif	27 February 2006 (aged 18)	(German Football Association) Wehen Wiesbaden
19	FW	Mohammad Al-Mustafa	20 January 2005 (aged 20)	(Syrian Football Association) Al-Wathba
20	DF	Mamdouh Warda	15 July 2007 (aged 17)	(Syrian Football Association) Tishreen
21	FW	Ahmad Khalil	11 April 2006 (aged 18)	(Syrian Football Association) Jableh
22	GK	Amr Sweidan	1 April 2004 (aged 20)	(Syrian Football Association) Al-Karameh
23	GK	Zain Alabdin Mahmoud	1 September 2007 (aged 17)	(Syrian Football Association) Tishreen

== Previous squads ==
- 1989 FIFA World Youth Championship squads – Syria
- 1991 FIFA World Youth Championship squads – Syria
- 2005 FIFA World Youth Championship squads – Syria

== Honours ==
- FIFA U-20 World Cup

Sixth place: 1991

- AFC U-20 Asian Cup

Winners (1): 1994
Runners-up (1): 1988
Third place (1): 1990
Fourth place (1): 2004

- Mandiri U20 Challenge Series
  - (gold) Champions (1): 2025

== See also ==
- Syria national football team
- Syria national under-23 football team
- Syria national under-17 football team
- Syrian Football Association
- Football in Syria
