= Qatar national under-20 football team =

Qatar Under-20
- Association: Qatar Football Association
- Confederation: AFC (Asia)
- Sub-confederation: WAFF (West Asia)
- Head coach: Emanuel Mesquita
- Home stadium: Khalifa International Stadium; Jassim bin Hamad Stadium
- FIFA code: QAT
First colours	Second colours

Biggest win
- Qatar 13–0 Bhutan (Doha, Qatar; 8 November 2007)

Biggest defeat
- Qatar 1–9 Australia (Tashkent, Uzbekistan; 7 March 2023)

FIFA U-20 World Cup
- Appearances: 4 (first in 1981)
- Best result: Runners-up (1981)

AFC U-20 Asian Cup
- Appearances: 16 (first in 1980)
- Best result: Champions (2014)

The Qatar national under-20 football team is the national youth team of Qatar and is controlled by the Qatar Football Association. Qatar's U-20 national team played an important role in the development of football in Qatar and gave it one of its first shining moments on the global stage when the youth squad finished second in the 1981 FIFA World Youth Championship in Australia.

== History ==
=== Formation ===
In response to the recently established World Youth Championship, Qatar established its national youth team in 1976. However, they were unable to qualify for the first two World Youth Championships in 1977 in Tunisia and in 1979 in Japan.

=== 1981 World Youth Championship ===
In the 1980 AFC Youth Championship which was held in Thailand, the Qatar U20 team finished as runners-up after losing to South Korea in the final. This granted them a spot in the 1981 FIFA World Youth Championship, which was hosted in Australia. Under the supervision of Brazilian coach Evaristo de Macedo, the championships proved to be a success. Facing Brazil in the quarter-finals, they were able to secure a 3–2 victory by utilizing the offside trap. They went on to face England in the semi-finals, where they earned a 2–1 victory after a fine performance by their goalkeeper.

The team finished second after losing 0–4 to West Germany in the final on a wet pitch which was unfavorable to the Qataris as they were not used to playing in such conditions. As a result of achieving runners-up position, each Qatari player received 100,000 Qatari riyals, a Mercedes Benz, and a bungalow. The population of Qataris was only 120,000 at the time of this achievement.

=== 1995 World Youth Championship ===
Qatar earned its second international U-20 World Cup appearance in 1995 as hosts. While Nigeria was preparing to host the 1995 edition, an Ebola epidemic broke out in West Africa, and as a result, FIFA decided to award the hosting rights to Qatar with only twenty days remaining till the start of the championships.

=== 2014 AFC U-19 Championship ===
Qatar's youth team won the AFC U-19 Championship for the first time in its history after defeating DPR Korea 1–0 in the final of the 2014 edition which took place in Myanmar. Advancing undefeated from a group which included DPR Korea and Iraq, they defeated China 4–2 in the quarter-finals, and earned a 3–2 victory after extra time against the hosts in the semi-finals. In the finals, the Qataris would be victorious against DPR Korea for a second time in the tournament, with super sub Akram Afif scoring the only goal of the match in the second half. The entire squad was composed of Aspire Academy students. As a result of Aspire's HOPE Project (Holistic Overseas Player Experience), most of the squad were European-based.

== Competitive record ==
=== FIFA U-20 World Cup ===
FIFA U-20 World Cup record
Hosts / Year	Result	GP	W	D	L	GS	GA
(Tunisia) 1977	did not qualify						
(Japan) 1979	did not qualify						
(Australia) 1981	Runners-up	6	3	1	2	7	9
(Mexico) 1983	did not qualify						
(Soviet Union) 1985	did not qualify						
(Chile) 1987	did not qualify						
(Saudi Arabia) 1989	did not qualify						
(Portugal) 1991	did not qualify						
(Australia) 1993	did not qualify						
(Qatar) 1995	Group stage	3	0	1	2	1	4
(Malaysia) 1997	did not qualify						
(Nigeria) 1999	did not qualify						
(Argentina) 2001	did not qualify						
(United Arab Emirates) 2003	did not qualify						
(Netherlands) 2005	did not qualify						
(Canada) 2007	did not qualify						
(Egypt) 2009	did not qualify						
(Colombia) 2011	did not qualify						
(Turkey) 2013	did not qualify						
(New Zealand) 2015	Group stage	3	0	0	3	1	7
(South Korea) 2017	did not qualify						
(Poland) 2019	Group stage	3	0	0	3	0	6
(Argentina) 2023	did not qualify						
(Chile) 2025	did not qualify						
(Azerbaijan) (Uzbekistan) 2027	did not qualify						
(Armenia) (Georgia (country)) 2029	To be determined						
Total	4/26	15	3	2	10	9	26

=== AFC U-20 Asian Cup ===
Year	Result	Pld	W	D	L	GF	GA
(Thailand) 1980	Runners-up	4	2	1	1	4	4
(Thailand) 1982	did not qualify						
(United Arab Emirates) 1985	did not qualify						
(Saudi Arabia) 1986	Fourth place	5	2	0	3	7	6
(Qatar) 1988	Third place	5	3	1	1	12	5
(Indonesia) 1990	Fourth place	5	3	0	2	5	3
(United Arab Emirates) 1992	Round 1	4	3	0	1	9	5
(Indonesia) 1994	Round 1	4	1	2	1	5	7
(South Korea) 1996	Round 1	4	0	1	3	3	12
(Thailand) 1998	Round 1	4	1	1	2	2	6
(Iran) 2000	did not qualify						
(Qatar) 2002	Round 1	3	1	0	2	7	8
(Malaysia) 2004	Quarter-finals	4	2	1	1	3	2
(India) 2006	did not qualify						
(Saudi Arabia) 2008	did not qualify						
(China) 2010	did not qualify						
(United Arab Emirates) 2012	Round 1	3	1	0	2	4	6
(Myanmar) 2014	Champions	6	5	1	0	14	6
(Bahrain) 2016	Round 1	3	1	1	1	2	4
(Indonesia) 2018	Semifinals	5	3	0	2	19	13
(Uzbekistan) 2023	Round 1	3	0	0	3	2	12
(China) 2025	Round 1	3	1	0	2	6	5
(China) 2027	did not qualify						
(China) 2029	to be determined						
Total	16/24	65	29	9	27	104	104

== Results and fixtures ==
=== 2026 ===
31 August 2026 2027 AFC U-20 Asian Cup qualification	Qatar	1–2	Oman	Doha, Qatar
19:00	Jamil 26'	Report	Al Alawi 64', 73'	Stadium: Abdullah bin Khalifa Stadium, Doha; Referee: Koki Nagamine (Japan)

3 September 2026 2027 AFC U-20 Asian Cup qualification	Hong Kong	0–3	Qatar	Doha, Qatar
19:00		Report	Al Sayed 10'; Ali 17'; Mohamed 45+1'	Stadium: Abdullah bin Khalifa Stadium, Doha; Referee: Ngô Duy Lân (Vietnam)

6 September 2026 2027 AFC U-20 Asian Cup qualification	Saudi Arabia	1–0	Qatar	Doha, Qatar
19:00	Ibrahim 81'	Report		Stadium: Abdullah bin Khalifa Stadium, Doha; Referee: Koki Nagamine (Japan)

== Managerial history ==
- (Brazil) Evaristo de Macedo (xx)
- (Brazil) José Faria (1979)
- (Brazil) Evaristo de Macedo (xx)
- (Brazil) João Francisco (1986)
- (Brazil) Edison de Souza (1987)
- (Brazil) Celso Roth (1991–92)
- (Brazil) Marcio Maximo (1994)
- (Denmark) Jørgen E. Larsen (1995)
- (Argentina) Alejandro Sabella (1995)
- (Brazil) José Paulo (1995–97)
- (Brazil) Marcelo Buarque (1997)
- (Brazil) José Paulo (1998)
- (Qatar) Obeid Jumaa (1998)
- (Netherlands) Ruud Doctor (2001–03)
- (Netherlands) Tiny Ruys (xx–2005)
- (Italy) Roberto Landi (2005–06)
- (Netherlands) Remco Boere (2007)
- (Netherlands) Tiny Ruys (xx–2011)
- (Netherlands) Marcel van Buuren (2011–2013)
- (Spain) Félix Sánchez (2013–2020)

== Head-to-head record ==
The following table shows Qatar's head-to-head record in the FIFA U-20 World Cup and AFC U-20 Asian Cup.

=== In FIFA U-20 World Cup ===
Opponent	Pld	W	D	L	GF	GA	GD	Win %
Brazil	2	1	0	1	3	4	−1	50.00
Colombia	1	0	0	1	0	1	−1	0.00
England	1	1	0	0	2	1	+1	100.00
Germany	1	0	0	1	0	4	−4	0.00
Nigeria	1	0	0	1	0	4	−4	0.00
Poland	1	1	0	0	1	0	+1	100.00
Portugal	1	0	0	1	0	4	−4	0.00
Russia	1	0	1	0	1	1	+0	0.00
Senegal	1	0	0	1	1	2	−1	0.00
Syria	1	0	0	1	0	1	−1	0.00
Ukraine	1	0	0	1	0	1	−1	0.00
United States	2	0	1	1	1	2	−1	0.00
Uruguay	1	0	0	1	0	1	−1	0.00
Total	15	3	2	10	9	26	−17	20.00

=== In AFC U-20 Asian Cup ===
Opponent	Pld	W	D	L	GF	GA	GD	Win %
Australia	3	0	0	3	2	13	−11	0.00
Bahrain	1	0	0	1	0	2	−2	0.00
Bangladesh	1	0	1	0	0	0	+0	0.00
China	6	2	0	4	12	13	−1	33.33
Chinese Taipei	1	1	0	0	4	0	+4	100.00
India	3	2	1	0	6	2	+4	66.67
Indonesia	5	4	1	0	13	7	+6	80.00
Iran	3	1	1	1	3	3	+0	33.33
Iraq	4	1	2	1	4	6	−2	25.00
Japan	5	1	1	3	1	11	−10	20.00
Kazakhstan	1	1	0	0	3	2	+1	100.00
Kyrgyzstan	1	1	0	0	4	0	+4	100.00
Myanmar	1	1	0	0	3	2	+1	100.00
New Zealand	1	1	0	0	3	0	+3	100.00
North Korea	5	4	0	1	9	3	+6	80.00
Oman	1	1	0	0	2	0	+2	100.00
Saudi Arabia	3	1	0	2	5	6	−1	33.33
South Korea	6	0	1	5	3	12	−9	0.00
Syria	5	1	1	3	3	6	−3	20.00
Thailand	4	4	0	0	15	7	+8	100.00
United Arab Emirates	2	1	0	1	3	2	+1	50.00
Uzbekistan	1	0	0	1	4	5	−1	0.00
Vietnam	1	0	0	1	1	2	−1	0.00
Yemen	1	1	0	0	1	0	+1	100.00
Total	65	29	9	27	104	104	+0	44.62

== See also ==
- Qatar national football team
- Qatar national under-17 football team
- Football in Qatar
