= Kuwait national under-20 football team =

National association football team

Kuwait Under-20
- Association: Kuwait Football Association
- Confederation: AFC (Asia)
- FIFA code: KUW
First colours	Second colours

First international
- Indonesia 0-1 Kuwait (Tokyo, Japan; 25 April 1971)

Biggest win
- Kuwait 10-0 Jordan (Kuwait City, Kuwait; 20 July 2002)

Biggest defeat
- Iran 6-0 Kuwait (United Arab Emirates; 7 November 2012)

World Cup
- Appearances: 0

Asian Championship
- Appearances: 8 (first in 1971)
- Best result: 3rd place in 1975 and 1978

The Kuwait national under-20 football team is the youth association football team representing Kuwait in youth competitions and it is controlled by Kuwait Football Association.

== Results ==
AFC U-20 Asian Cup

Year	Result	M	W	D	L	GF	GA
(Japan) 1971	Quarterfinals	4	2	1	1	2	2
(Kuwait) 1975	3rd place	7	4	3	0	15	2
(Thailand) 1976	Group stage	3	0	3	0	6	6
(Bangladesh) 1978	3rd place	7	4	3	0	12	4
(Indonesia) 1994	Group stage	4	0	2	2	3	9
(Thailand) 1998	Group stage	4	0	2	2	2	5
(Iran) 2000	Group stage	4	2	0	2	8	8
(United Arab Emirates) 2012	Group stage	3	0	1	2	1	8
Total	8/40	36	12	15	9	49	44

== Results and fixtures ==
31 August 2026 2027 AFC U-20 Asian Cup qualification	Japan	4–0	Kuwait	Phnom Penh
	Fuji 15'; Hamasaki 35' (pen.); Tokuda 40', 42'	Report		Stadium: Olympic Stadium; Referee: Resul Mämmedow (Turkmenistan)

3 September 2026 2027 AFC U-20 Asian Cup qualification	Kuwait	1–3	Yemen	Phnom Penh
	Al-Adwani 69'	Report	Saleh 24', 71'; Zaid 85'	Stadium: Olympic Stadium; Referee: Akobirxuja Shukurullaev (Uzbekistan)

6 September 2026 2027 AFC U-20 Asian Cup qualification	Cambodia	0–5	Kuwait	Phnom Penh
		Report	Allanqawi 12'; Al-Azemi 26'; Al-Adwani 40', 64'; Al-Qarzaei 55' (pen.)	Stadium: Olympic Stadium; Referee: Yousif Saeed Hasan (Iraq)

== See also ==
- Kuwait national football team
- Kuwait national under-23 football team
- Kuwait women's national football team
