= Bahrain national under-20 football team =

The Bahrain national under-20 football team, or Bahrain U20, has competed several times in the AFC Youth Championship, and once in the FIFA U-20 World Cup.

== AFC U-19 Championship ==
Year	M	W	D	L	GF	GA
(Iran) 1973	3	0	2	1	1	3
(Kuwait) 1975	5	4	0	1	6	2
(Iran) 1977	5	2	2	1	9	8
(Bangladesh) 1978	5	2	1	2	6	4
(Saudi Arabia) 1986	5	3	1	1	11	3
(Indonesia) 1990	3	0	1	2	1	7
(Indonesia) 1994	4	0	3	1	4	6
(China) 2010	3	1	0	2	2	4
(Bahrain) 2016	4	2	0	2	7	7
(Indonesia) 2018	did not qualify					
(Uzbekistan) 2023	did not qualify					
Total	37	14	10	13	47	44

Bahrain national under-20 football team qualified for the 1987 FIFA World Youth Championship.

== FIFA U-20 World Cup ==
- 1977 to 1985: Did not qualify

- 1987: Group Stage

- 1989 to 2025: Did not Qualify
