= 2026 ASEAN U-19 Boys Championship squads =

The 2026 ASEAN U-19 Boys' Championship (officially the ASEAN U-19 Boys' Bank Sumut Championship) is an international football tournament held in Medan, North Sumatra, Indonesia from 1 to 13 June 2026. The 11 national teams involved in the tournament were required to register a squad of 23 players in which three must be goalkeepers; only players in these squads are eligible to take part in the tournament. Players born on or after 1 January 2007 are eligible to participate.

== Group A ==
=== Indonesia ===
Head coach: Nova Arianto

No.	Pos.	Player	Date of birth (age)	Caps	Goals	Club
1	GK	Rendy Razzaqu	8 January 2008 (age 18)	0	0	(Football Association of Indonesia) Madura United
2	DF	Rafa Abdurahman	20 August 2007 (age 19)	0	0	(Football Association of Indonesia) Persija Jakarta
3	DF	Ibrah Ohorella	20 February 2007 (age 19)	0	0	(Football Association of Indonesia) Persija Jakarta
4	DF	Putu Panji (captain)	2 April 2008 (age 18)	0	0	(Football Association of Indonesia) Bali United
5	DF	Mathew Baker	13 May 2009 (age 17)	0	0	(Football Australia) Melbourne City
6	MF	Evandra Florasta	17 June 2008 (age 18)	4	0	(Football Association of Indonesia) Bhayangkara Presisi Lampung
7	FW	Reno Salampessy	22 June 2007 (age 19)	0	0	(Football Association of Indonesia) Persipura Jayapura
8	MF	Arkhan Kaka	2 September 2007 (age 19)	17	1	(Football Association of Indonesia) Persis Solo
9	FW	Dimas Adi Prasetyo	13 April 2008 (age 18)	0	0	(Football Association of Indonesia) PSM Makassar
10	FW	Theodore Leeming	20 December 2007 (age 18)	0	0	(Football Association of Indonesia) Persija Jakarta
11	MF	Nazriel Alfaro	1 January 2008 (age 18)	0	0	(Football Association of Indonesia) Persib Bandung
12	MF	Welber Jardim	25 April 2007 (age 19)	16	0	(Brazilian Football Confederation) São Paulo
13	DF	Eizar Tanjung	30 August 2008 (age 18)	0	0	(Football Australia) Sydney FC
14	MF	Fabio Azkairawan	29 February 2008 (age 18)	0	0	(Football Association of Indonesia) Persija Jakarta
15	MF	Zinadein Ardiansyah	4 October 2007 (age 18)	0	0	(Football Australia) Sydney FC
16	DF	Algazani Dwi Sugandi	6 January 2008 (age 18)	0	0	(Football Association of Indonesia) Adhyaksa Banten
17	MF	Amar Brkić	11 June 2007 (age 19)	1	0	(German Football Association) Darmstadt 98
18	MF	Isfandyar Abdillah	23 June 2007 (age 19)	0	0	(Football Association of Indonesia) Persiba Balikpapan
19	DF	Raditya Rahardjo	16 May 2007 (age 19)	0	0	(Football Association of Indonesia) Persija Jakarta
20	DF	Timothy Baker	3 May 2007 (age 19)	0	0	(Football Australia) Western United
21	FW	Irpan Siregar	2 June 2007 (age 19)	0	0	(Football Association of Indonesia) Persija Jakarta
22	GK	Er Deva Aulia	2 February 2007 (age 19)	0	0	(Football Association of Indonesia) Persis Solo
23	GK	Dafa Setiawarman	12 February 2008 (age 18)	0	0	(Football Association of Indonesia) Dewa United Banten

=== Vietnam ===
Head coach: (Japan) Yutaka Ikeuchi

No.	Pos.	Player	Date of birth (age)	Caps	Goals	Club
1	GK	Nguyễn Bảo Ngọc	28 March 2007 (age 19)	1	0	(Vietnam Football Federation) Sông Lam Nghệ An
2	DF	Hoàng Minh Hợi	5 August 2007 (age 19)	3	0	(Vietnam Football Federation) Sông Lam Nghệ An
3	DF	Nguyễn Quốc Khánh (captain)	15 June 2007 (age 19)	5	0	(Vietnam Football Federation) PVF-CAND
4	DF	Lê Huy Việt Anh	21 January 2008 (age 18)	0	0	(Vietnam Football Federation) PVF-CAND
5	DF	Lê Tấn Dũng	8 January 2008 (age 18)	0	0	(Vietnam Football Federation) Sông Lam Nghệ An
6	MF	Trần Gia Hưng	24 August 2007 (age 19)	0	0	(Vietnam Football Federation) PVF-CAND
7	FW	Hoàng Trọng Duy Khang	12 August 2008 (age 18)	0	0	(Vietnam Football Federation) PVF
8	MF	Đào Quang Anh	18 May 2007 (age 19)	0	0	(Vietnam Football Federation) PVF-CAND
9	FW	Hoàng Công Hậu	27 June 2007 (age 19)	0	0	(Vietnam Football Federation) Huế
10	FW	Trần Quốc Hòa	1 August 2007 (age 19)	0	0	(Vietnam Football Federation) Quảng Ngãi
11	FW	Nguyễn Văn Bách	8 February 2008 (age 18)	0	0	(Vietnam Football Federation) PVF
12	DF	Nguyễn Hoàng Nam	7 October 2007 (age 18)	0	0	(Vietnam Football Federation) Thể Công–Viettel
13	GK	Phạm Huy Hoàng	27 February 2007 (age 19)	0	0	(Vietnam Football Federation) PVF
14	MF	Nguyễn Văn Khánh	28 November 2008 (age 17)	0	0	(Vietnam Football Federation) Hồng Lĩnh Hà Tĩnh
15	DF	Lê Minh Nhật	15 February 2007 (age 19)	0	0	(Vietnam Football Federation) PVF-CAND
16	MF	Đậu Hồng Phong	6 September 2008 (age 17)	0	0	(Vietnam Football Federation) Hà Nội
17	MF	Trương Gia Khôi	2008 (age 17-18)	0	0	(Royal Spanish Football Federation) Huesca
18	DF	Nguyễn Tấn Minh	27 July 2007 (age 19)	0	0	(Vietnam Football Federation) Sông Lam Nghệ An
19	FW	Nguyễn Thiên Phú	25 January 2008 (age 18)	0	0	(Vietnam Football Federation) Hà Nội
20	MF	Nguyễn Trọng Đức Vũ	17 October 2007 (age 18)	0	0	(Vietnam Football Federation) PVF
21	MF	Nguyễn Thành Vinh	3 April 2007 (age 19)	0	0	(Vietnam Football Federation) SHB Đà Nẵng
22	DF	Đinh Xuân Khải	24 June 2007 (age 19)	0	0	(Vietnam Football Federation) Thép Xanh Nam Định
23	GK	Hoa Xuân Tín	29 January 2008 (age 18)	0	0	(Vietnam Football Federation) Công An Hồ Chí Minh City

=== Myanmar ===
Head coach: TBC

No.	Pos.	Player	Date of birth (age)	Caps	Goals	Club
1	GK	Min Yo Sai Khant				(Myanmar Football Federation) Junior Lions FC
18	GK	Phone Pyae Sone Oo				(Myanmar Football Federation) Junior Lions FC
23	GK	Kaung Kin Kyal				(Myanmar Football Federation) Yangon City FC
2	DF	Swan Zarni				(Myanmar Football Federation) Junior Lions FC
3	DF	Thiha Aung				(Myanmar Football Federation) Junior Lions FC
4	DF	Thet Paing Soe				(Myanmar Football Federation) Junior Lions FC
5	DF	Sai Khan Nyi				(Myanmar Football Federation) Ayeyawady United U19
13	DF	Zaw Lin Aung				(Myanmar Football Federation) Junior Lions FC
14	DF	Sai Zom Shang				(Myanmar Football Federation) Junior Lions FC
16	DF	Myo Khant Kyaw				(Myanmar Football Federation) Falcon FC
20	DF	Sai Mao Han				(Myanmar Football Federation) Junior Lions FC
22	DF	Zay Htet Aung				(Myanmar Football Federation) Junior Lions FC
8	MF	Nyan Soe San				(Myanmar Football Federation) Junior Lions FC
9	MF	Khant Win Aung				(Myanmar Football Federation) Junior Lions FC
10	MF	Thaw Zin Ko				(Myanmar Football Federation) Junior Lions FC
12	MF	Khun Maung Lone				(Myanmar Football Federation) Junior Lions FC
15	MF	Kyaw Nyi Nyi				(Myanmar Football Federation) Junior Lions FC
17	MF	Kyal Yaung Min Lay				(Myanmar Football Federation) Junior Lions FC
6	MF	Kyaw Thiha				(Myanmar Football Federation) Junior Lions FC
11	FW	Kaung Khant Kyaw	26 February 2007 (age 19)			(Myanmar Football Federation) Hantharwady United
7	FW	Sai Bo Bo Kyaw				(Myanmar Football Federation) Junior Lions FC
19	FW	Thura Min Thant				(Myanmar Football Federation) Junior Lions FC
21	FW	La Min Pyae Sone				(Myanmar Football Federation) Yangon United Academy

=== Timor-Leste ===
Head coach: TBC

No.	Pos.	Player	Date of birth (age)	Club
1	GK	Domingos Almeiron		(East Timor Football Federation)
12	GK	Alexandre Lima		(East Timor Football Federation) Emmanuel FC
20	GK	Tristan	5 December 2008 (age 17)	(East Timor Football Federation) Emmanuel FC
2	DF	Rui Juman		(East Timor Football Federation)
3	DF	Carol Waitilia		(East Timor Football Federation)
4	DF	Aureo Viera		(East Timor Football Federation)
6	DF	Fabrizio do Santos		(East Timor Football Federation)
18	DF	Emidio Martins		(East Timor Football Federation) SLB Laulara
19	DF	Francisco Assisi		(East Timor Football Federation)
13	DF	Norbert Jonerson		(East Timor Football Federation)
5	MF	Palomito	14 June 2005 (age 21)	(East Timor Football Federation) Emmanuel FC
14	MF	Edencio Soares	5 October 2005 (age 20)	(East Timor Football Federation) Porto Taibesse
16	MF	Quilton	17 April 2007 (age 19)	(East Timor Football Federation) Ponta Leste
17	MF	Ario Melio		(East Timor Football Federation)
21	MF	Uaitila Aprilio		(East Timor Football Federation)
23	MF	Claudio Faria		(East Timor Football Federation)
8	MF	Luis da Silva	20 May 2006 (age 20)	(East Timor Football Federation) SLB Laulara
22	MF	Marques de Carvalho	25 February 2007 (age 19)	(East Timor Football Federation) SLB Laulara
11	FW	Vabio Canavaro	25 January 2007 (age 19)	(Football Association of Singapore) Tanjong Pagar United
10	FW	Corsino Lemos	1 June 2006 (age 20)	(East Timor Football Federation) Karketu Dili FC
9	FW	Alexandre Vong Guterres		(East Timor Football Federation)

== Group B ==
=== Thailand ===
Head coach: Chakraphan Panpee

No.	Pos.	Player	Date of birth (age)	Caps	Goals	Club
	GK	Poomraphee Siribunyakul	23 July 2008 (age 18)	0	0	(Japan Football Association) Kashima Gakuen High School
	GK	Rangsiman Kemmueang	16 January 2008 (age 18)	0	0	(Football Association of Thailand) Port FC
	GK	Suphakorn Poolphol	25 September 2008 (age 17)	0	0	(Football Association of Thailand) Nongbua Pitchaya
	DF	Wichan Inaram	20 July 2007 (age 19)	0	0	(Football Association of Thailand) Bangkok United
	DF	Phurich Subhensawang	1 February 2007 (age 19)	0	0	(Football Association of Thailand) Bangkok United
	DF	Surachai Booncharee	26 April 2007 (age 19)	0	0	(Football Association of Thailand) Bangkok United
	DF	Jeerapong Chamsakul	4 January 2007 (age 19)	0	0	(Football Association of Thailand) Bangbeung
	DF	Supanat Mahawai	12 April 2007 (age 19)	0	0	(Football Association of Thailand) Buriram United
	DF	Theerathep Thongkham		0	0	(Football Association of Thailand) Hornbill Junior
	DF	Apiwich Laorkhai	22 February 2007 (age 19)	0	0	(Football Association of Thailand) Burapha United
	DF	Punyapop Khunsri		0	0	(Football Association of Thailand) Suankularb Wittayalai School
	MF	Danuphon Buppha	15 January 2008 (age 18)	0	0	(Football Association of Thailand) Muangthong United
	MF	David Songsampao		0	0	(Football Association of Thailand) Hua Hin City
	MF	Ratchanon Kochaseni		0	0	(Football Association of Thailand) Buriram United
	MF	Pichaya Kongsri	3 August 2007 (age 19)	0	0	(Football Association of Thailand) Bangkok United
	MF	Pattaratron Buransuk	24 October 2007 (age 18)	0	0	(Football Association of Thailand) Nongbua Pitchaya
	MF	Pirada Larsawat	9 May 2008 (age 18)	0	0	(Football Association of Thailand) Prime Bangkok
	FW	Witthawat Phraothaisong	21 April 2007 (age 19)	0	0	(Football Association of Thailand) BG Pathum United
	FW	Itthimon Tippanet	30 November 2007 (age 18)	0	0	(Football Association of Thailand) BG Pathum United
	FW	Siwakorn Ponsan	24 January 2008 (age 18)	0	0	(Football Association of Thailand) BG Pathum United
	FW	Kongnat Thuamthongdee	25 January 2007 (age 19)	0	0	(Football Association of Thailand) Chamchuri United
	FW	Natthakit Phosri	8 February 2008 (age 18)	0	0	(Football Association of Thailand) Port FC
	FW	Sirisaran Chanjaemsai		0	0	(Football Association of Thailand) Assumption United

=== Malaysia ===
Head coach: Nafuzi Zain

No.	Pos.	Player	Date of birth (age)	Club
1	GK	Zidan Fazly	17 July 2008 (age 18)	(Football Association of Malaysia) Selangor
2	DF	Ilhaam Azani	12 January 2008 (age 18)	(Football Association of Malaysia) Johor Darul Ta'zim
3	DF	Irfan Aswad	7 August 2007 (age 19)	(Japan Football Association) Shonan Bellmare
4	DF	Aisy Aqasha	5 March 2008 (age 18)	(Football Association of Malaysia) Johor Darul Ta'zim
5	DF	Lutfil Hadi	4 September 2007 (age 18)	(Football Association of Malaysia) Johor Darul Ta'zim
6	MF	Arif Aiman Za'aba	21 April 2007 (age 19)	(Football Association of Malaysia) Johor Darul Ta'zim
7	FW	Izzuddin Afif	1 March 2008 (age 18)	(Football Association of Malaysia) Johor Darul Ta'zim
8	MF	Arsyad Shamsul Aswadi	11 January 2007 (age 19)	(Football Association of Malaysia) Johor Darul Ta'zim
9	FW	Abid Safaraz	6 March 2007 (age 19)	(Football Association of Malaysia) Johor Darul Ta'zim
10	FW	Arayyan Hakeem	19 September 2009 (age 16)	(Football Association of Malaysia) Johor Darul Ta'zim
11	MF	Tengku Hasyri	18 August 2008 (age 18)	(Football Association of Malaysia) Johor Darul Ta'zim
12	MF	Danial Hqzeiry	13 March 2007 (age 19)	(Football Association of Malaysia) Selangor
13	FW	Ierfan Hafizan	12 August 2007 (age 19)	(Football Association of Malaysia) Johor Darul Ta'zim
14	MF	Luka Jordy Hodak	30 September 2008 (age 17)	(Croatian Football Federation) Trnje
15	DF	Amar Imran	30 June 2008 (age 18)	(Football Association of Malaysia) Johor Darul Ta'zim
16	GK	Januwaar Gopal	15 February 2007 (age 19)	(Football Association of Malaysia) Johor Darul Ta'zim
17	DF	Airel Husainy	5 February 2007 (age 19)	(Football Association of Malaysia) Selangor
18	FW	Adib Rashidi	16 February 2008 (age 18)	(Football Association of Malaysia) Selangor
19	DF	Adam Hakimi Zaki	2 July 2008 (age 18)	(Football Association of Malaysia) Johor Darul Ta'zim
20	DF	Syazril Izwan	25 December 2008 (age 17)	(Football Association of Malaysia) Selangor
21	FW	Naqif Firhad	25 January 2008 (age 18)	(Football Association of Malaysia) Johor Darul Ta'zim
22	GK	Faez Iqhwan	3 February 2007 (age 19)	(Football Association of Malaysia) Johor Darul Ta'zim
23	MF	Pravinash Ravindran	23 May 2008 (age 18)	(Football Association of Malaysia) MISC-Touchtronics

=== Singapore ===
Head coach: Syed Azmir

No.	Pos.	Player	Date of birth (age)	Caps	Goals	Club
1	GK	Ilhan Rezal	19 March 2010 (age 16)			(Football Association of Singapore) Lion City Sailors
2	GK	Issac Goh	5 June 2007 (age 19)			(Football Association of Singapore) Young Lions
3	GK	Jarec Ng	25 January 2008 (age 18)			(Football Association of Singapore) BG Tampines Rovers
4	DF	Ilhan Farid	17 September 2008 (age 17)			(Football Association of Singapore) Young Lions
5	DF	Levi Farris	31 May 2007 (age 19)			(Football Association of Singapore) Young Lions
6	DF	Loo Kai Sheng	9 January 2007 (age 19)			(Football Association of Singapore) Young Lions
7	DF	Luth Harith (vice-captain)	19 March 2008 (age 18)			(Football Association of Singapore) Young Lions
8	DF	Nur Muhammad	30 May 2007 (age 19)			(Football Association of Singapore) Young Lions
9	DF	Ryan Vishal	25 January 2007 (age 19)			(Football Association of Singapore) Young Lions
10	DF	Zeeshan Iskandar	3 April 2007 (age 19)			(Football Association of Singapore) BG Tampines Rovers
11	MF	Andy Reefqy (captain)	14 July 2008 (age 18)			(Football Association of Singapore) Young Lions
12	MF	Danial Herwan	19 September 2008 (age 17)			(Football Association of Singapore) Young Lions
13	MF	Ikmal Hazlan	11 January 2007 (age 19)			(Football Association of Singapore) Lion City Sailors
14	MF	Jaden Heng	10 November 2008 (age 17)			(Football Association of Singapore) Albirex Niigata (S)
15	MF	Qylfie Ryan	15 April 2007 (age 19)			(Football Association of Singapore) BG Tampines Rovers
16	MF	Sarrvin Raj	5 April 2008 (age 18)			(Football Association of Singapore) Young Lions
17	MF	Uchenna Eziakor	17 May 2008 (age 18)			(Football Association of Singapore) Young Lions
18	MF	Vedant Raj	5 June 2009 (age 17)			(Football Association of Singapore) Geylang International
19	MF	Zaki Jumlan	6 June 2009 (age 17)			(Football Association of Singapore) Young Lions
20	FW	Liska Haaziq	30 April 2007 (age 19)			(Football Association of Singapore) Albirex Niigata (S)
21	FW	Prince Rio	28 December 2007 (age 18)			(Football Association of Singapore) Geylang International
22	FW	Rae Peh	15 September 2008 (age 17)			(Football Association of Singapore) BG Tampines Rovers
23	FW	Varghese Ethan	25 May 2009 (age 17)			(Football Association of Singapore) Lion City Sailors

=== Brunei Darussalam ===
Head coach: TBC

No.	Pos.	Player	Date of birth (age)	Caps	Goals	Club
1	GK	Akmal Hakeem Shamsuddin		1	0	(Football Association of Brunei Darussalam) DPMM
18	GK	Safwan Aflie Shahrin		0	0	(Football Association of Brunei Darussalam) Kasuka
20	GK	Adrian Daniel Suhaimi		0	0	(Football Association of Brunei Darussalam) Kasuka
2	DF	Adrian Marvel Erni		1	0	(Football Association of Brunei Darussalam) Kasuka
3	DF	Azri Danial Yusra		0	0	(Football Association of Brunei Darussalam) DPMM
5	DF	Mahmud Khalish Zaifulizham		1	0	(Football Association of Brunei Darussalam) DPMM
12	DF	Hazwan Izuddin Noorizam		0	0	(Football Association of Brunei Darussalam) Kasuka
13	DF	Darwishafis Hamzillah		1	0	(Football Association of Brunei Darussalam) DPMM
14	DF	Syahmi Wa'ie Khirol Effendi		1	0	(Football Association of Brunei Darussalam) Kasuka
15	DF	Amirul Umar Saiful Rizal		0	0	(Football Association of Brunei Darussalam) DPMM
17	DF	Khalish Wa'ie Azman	11 April 2009 (age 17)	1	0	(Football Association of Brunei Darussalam) Indera
19	DF	Safwan Ikhwan Safiuddin Jasri		0	0	(Football Association of Brunei Darussalam) DPMM
6	MF	Hadiman Sulaiman		1	0	(Football Association of Brunei Darussalam) Kasuka
10	MF	Ilyas Ilyasa Yahya		1	0	(Football Association of Brunei Darussalam) BSRC
11	MF	Faris Fadillah Saiful Bahari	1 January 2008 (age 18)	1	0	(Football Association of Brunei Darussalam) DPMM
16	MF	Faaiz Zulkeflee		0	0	(Football Association of Brunei Darussalam) Kasuka
21	MF	Danish Saqhwi Razali		0	0	(Football Association of Brunei Darussalam) Gergasi
23	MF	Al-Amin Khairol Norlizam		0	0	(Football Association of Brunei Darussalam) Kasuka
4	FW	Faris Ar-Rayyan Yahya		0	0	(Football Association of Brunei Darussalam) BSRC
7	FW	Shaqeel Qays Wafri Suhardi		1	0	(Football Association of Brunei Darussalam) Kasuka
8	FW	Harith Aqil Azaman		0	0	(Football Association of Brunei Darussalam) DPMM
9	FW	Arshyad Taqiuddin Abdul Rahim		1	0	(Football Association of Brunei Darussalam) Kasuka
22	FW	Daryyl Rafael Edy Asmyra		0	0	(Football Association of Brunei Darussalam) Falcon Sports

== Group C ==
=== Australia ===
Head coach: Trevor Morgan

No.	Pos.	Player	Date of birth (age)	Caps	Goals	Club
	GK	George Plusnin		0	0	(Football Australia) Brisbane Roar
	GK	Daniel Graskoski	28 January 2007 (age 19)	0	0	(Football Australia) Melbourne Victory
	GK	Lachlan Charles		0	0	(Football Australia) Melbourne City
	DF	Alex Bolton		0	0	(Swedish Football Association) AIK
	DF	Delano Cecchi		0	0	(Italian Football Federation) Sampdoria
	DF	Maxwell Cooper		0	0	(Football Australia) Newcastle Jets
	DF	Luka Didulica		0	0	(Japan Football Association) Urawa Red Diamonds
	DF	Mikael Evagorou-Alao		0	0	(Football Australia) Brisbane Roar
	DF	Alexander Garbowski		0	0	(Swedish Football Association) BK Häcken
	DF	Lewis Marinucci		0	0	(Football Australia) Melbourne Victory
	DF	Peter Antoniou		0	0	(Football Australia) Melbourne City
	MF	Nickolas Alfaro		0	0	(Football Australia) Sydney FC
	MF	Beckham Baker		0	0	(Football Australia) Melbourne City
	MF	Harry Crawford		0	0	(Football Australia) Adelaide United
	MF	Oliver Dragicevic		0	0	(Football Australia) Melbourne Victory
	MF	Haine Eames		0	0	(Football Australia) Central Coast Mariners
	MF	Alexandro Nunes		0	0	(Football Australia) Newcastle Jets
	MF	Jai Rose		0	0	(Football Australia) Western Sydney Wanderers
	MF	Lawrence Wong		0	0	(Football Australia) Melbourne City
	FW	Mathias MacAllister		0	0	(Football Australia) Sydney FC
	FW	Medin Memeti	20 July 2007 (age 19)	0	0	(Football Australia) Melbourne City
	FW	Marcus Neill		0	0	(The Football Association) Sunderland
	FW	Amlani Tatu		0	0	(Football Australia) Adelaide United

=== Philippines ===
Head coach: TBC

No.	Pos.	Player	Date of birth (age)	Caps	Goals	Club
	GK	Polo Tansingco	22 February 2007 (age 19)			(Philippine Football Federation) Ateneo Blue Eagles
	GK	Enrique Sunico	16 January 2008 (age 18)			(Philippine Football Federation) UST Golden Booters
	GK	Luc Narido	9 August 2007 (age 19)			(United States Soccer Federation) Santa Cruz Breakers Academy
	DF	Armaan Noorani	5 February 2008 (age 18)			(United Arab Emirates Football Association) Shabab Al-Ahli Youth
	DF	Carlito Vergara	16 October 2007 (age 18)			(Philippine Football Federation) Southridge Admirals
	DF	Peter Mirasol	1 August 2008 (age 18)			(Royal Spanish Football Federation) AD San José
	DF	Jessy Ramasola	9 July 2007 (age 19)			(Philippine Football Federation) UST Golden Booters
	MF	Renz Partosa	29 August 2008 (age 18)			(Philippine Football Federation) DLSU Green Archers
	MF	Ethan Kurpiewski	11 February 2009 (age 17)			(United States Soccer Federation) Inter Miami CF Academy
	MF	Kian Niu	12 April 2007 (age 19)			(Philippine Football Federation) FEU Tamaraws
	MF	Kenzo Chua	11 November 2008 (age 17)			(Philippine Football Federation) One Taguig
	MF	John Lloyd Amita	3 May 2007 (age 19)			(Philippine Football Federation) FEU Tamaraws
	MF	Benz Samaniego	1 September 2007 (age 19)			(Philippine Football Federation) UP Fighting Maroons
	MF	Spencer Webster	10 October 2008 (age 17)			(Football Australia) St. George City FA
	MF	Jeremy Alonso	12 July 2007 (age 19)			(Canadian Soccer Association) Calgary Villains FC
	FW	Rocket Ritarita	16 April 2007 (age 19)			(United States Soccer Federation) Maryland Terrapins
	FW	Liam Ippolito	12 January 2007 (age 19)			(Football Australia) APIA Leichhardt Tigers U20
	FW	William Mahas	11 May 2007 (age 19)			(Swedish Football Association) IFK Stocksund U19
	FW	Jerby Anito	21 January 2007 (age 19)			(Philippine Football Federation) FEU Tamaraws
	FW	Maruelle Tongzon	21 June 2007 (age 19)			(Football Australia) Western United Youth
	FW	Samuel Chesworth	6 December 2007 (age 18)			(Football Association of Wales) FC Wrexham U18
	FW	Jacob Keleghan	7 October 2007 (age 18)			(Philippine Football Federation) FEU Tamaraws
