= Indonesia national under-20 football team =

National association football team

Indonesia U-20
- Nickname(s): Garuda Muda (The Young Garuda); Merah Putih (The Red and White)
- Association: PSSI (Football Association of Indonesia)
- Confederation: AFC (Asia)
- Sub-confederation: AFF (Southeast Asia)
- Head coach: Nova Arianto
- Captain: Putu Panji
- Most caps: Dony Tri Pamungkas (35)
- Top scorer: Egy Maulana Vikri (15)
- Home stadium: Gelora Bung Karno Stadium
- FIFA code: IDN
First colours	Second colours

First international
- Indonesia 9–3 Singapore (Kuala Lumpur, Malaysia; 30 March 1960)

Biggest win
- Guam 0–12 Indonesia (Ho Chi Minh City, Vietnam; 12 November 2008)

Biggest defeat
- Indonesia 0–7 Japan (Bandung, Indonesia; 9 November 2009)

FIFA U-20 World Cup
- Appearances: 1 (first in 1979)
- Best result: Group stage (1979)

AFC U-20 Asian Cup
- Appearances: 20 (first in 1960)
- Best result: Champions (1961)

ASEAN U-19 Boys Championship
- Appearances: 12 (first in 2002)
- Best result: Champions (2013, 2024)

The Indonesia national under-20 football team represents Indonesia at international association football tournaments such as the FIFA U-20 World Cup, AFC U-20 Asian Cup, ASEAN U-19 Boys Championship, and any under-20 tournaments.

== Coaching staff ==
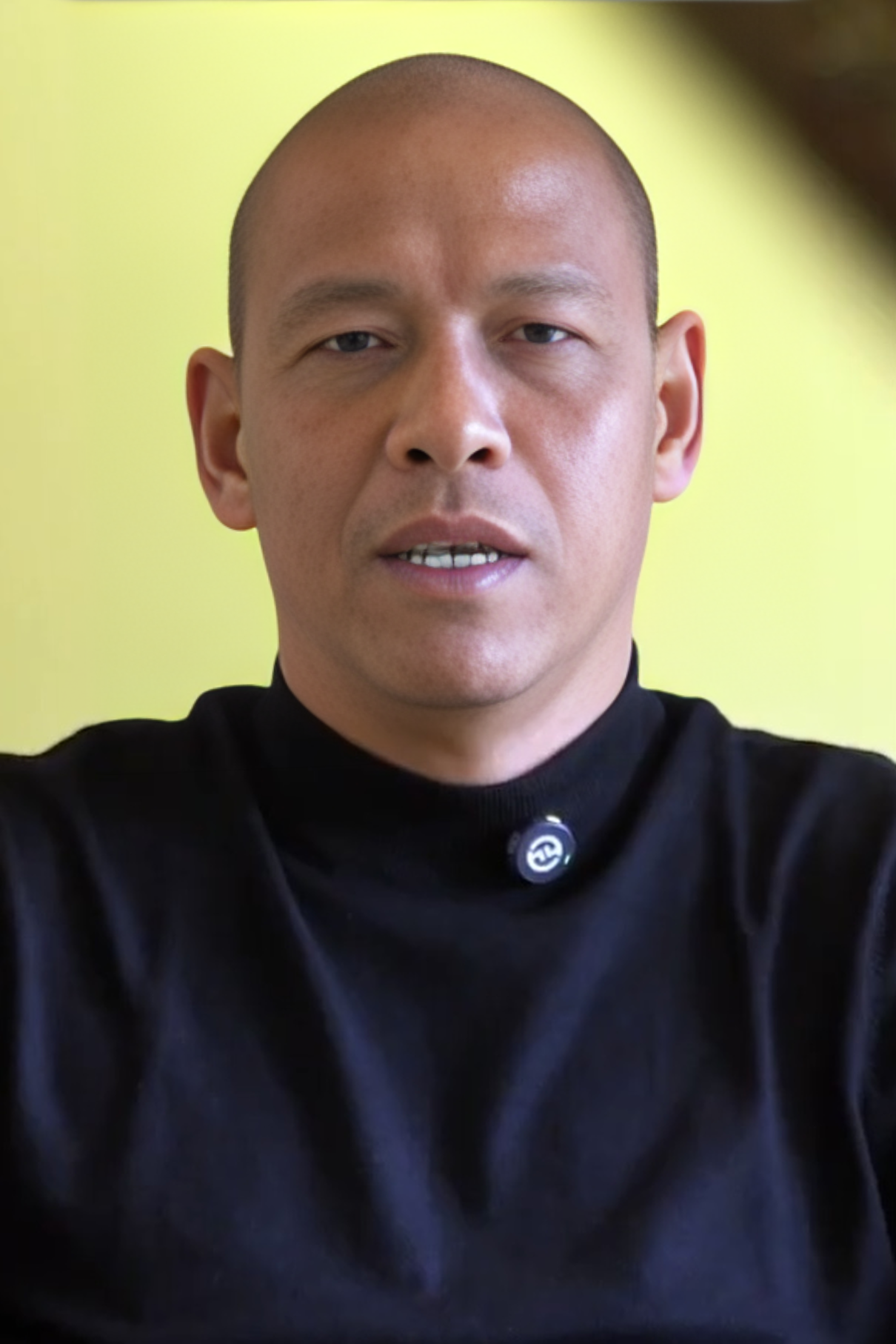
Nova Arianto, the head coach of the Indonesia national under-20 football team

Position	Name
Head coach	Nova Arianto
Assistant coaches	Haryanto Prasetyo
Assistant coaches	Gendut Doni
Goalkeeping coaches	Andreas Kristiyanto
Goalkeeping coaches	Dedy Gusmawan
Fitness coach	Sofie Imam Faisal
Doctor	Agung Santosa
Physiotherapist	Enggar Puridyasmoro

== Players ==
=== Current squad ===
The following 23 players were called up to the squad for the 2027 AFC U-20 Asian Cup qualification phase on 31 August – 6 September 2026.

Caps and goals are corrected as of 6 September 2026 against Australia.

No.	Pos.	Player	Date of birth (age)	Caps	Goals	Club
1	GK	Rendy Razzaqu	8 January 2008 (age 18)	0	0	(Football Association of Indonesia) Adhyaksa Banten
22	GK	Er Deva Aulia	2 February 2007 (age 19)	0	0	(Football Association of Indonesia) Kendal Tornado
23	GK	Dafa Setiawarman	12 February 2008 (age 18)	8	0	(Football Association of Indonesia) Dewa United Banten
2	DF	Ghifari Azhhari	15 September 2007 (age 19)	0	0	(Football Association of Indonesia) Semen Padang
3	DF	Ibrah Ohorella	20 February 2007 (age 19)	5	0	(Football Association of Indonesia) Borneo
4	DF	Putu Panji (captain)	2 April 2008 (age 18)	7	0	(Football Association of Indonesia) Bali United
14	DF	Fabio Azkairawan	29 February 2008 (age 18)	6	1	(Football Association of Indonesia) Persija Jakarta
17	DF	Amar Brkić	11 June 2007 (age 19)	7	1	Free Agent
5	MF	Raditya Rahardjo	16 May 2007 (age 19)	3	0	(Football Association of Indonesia) Persija Jakarta
6	MF	Eizar Tanjung	30 August 2008 (age 18)	4	0	(Football Australia) Sydney FC
11	MF	Gerard Edginataqi	3 April 2007 (age 19)	0	0	(Football Association of Indonesia) Barito Putera
12	MF	Welber Jardim	25 April 2007 (age 19)	23	0	(Brazilian Football Confederation) São Paulo
15	MF	Aleandro Alan	1 November 2007 (age 19)	3	0	(Football Association of Indonesia) Persebaya Surabaya
16	MF	Algazani Dwi Sugandi	6 January 2008 (age 18)	7	1	(Football Association of Indonesia) Adhyaksa Banten
18	MF	Isfandyar Abdillah	23 June 2007 (age 19)	7	0	(Football Association of Indonesia) PSS Sleman
19	MF	Nazriel Alfaro	1 January 2008 (age 18)	8	0	(Football Association of Indonesia) Persib Bandung
20	MF	Ruben Asoka	30 March 2007 (age 19)	0	0	(Football Association of Indonesia) Bhayangkara Presisi Lampung
21	MF	Irpan Siregar	2 June 2007 (age 19)	5	1	(Football Association of Indonesia) Persija Jakarta
7	FW	Reno Salampessy	22 June 2007 (age 19)	8	2	(Football Association of Indonesia) Persipura Jayapura
8	FW	Arkhan Kaka	2 September 2007 (age 19)	24	3	Free Agent
9	FW	Zahaby Gholy	5 December 2008 (age 17)	3	2	(Football Association of Indonesia) Adhyaksa Banten
10	FW	Theodore Leeming	20 December 2007 (age 18)	7	2	(Football Association of Indonesia) Persis Solo
13	FW	Rafi Rasyiq	30 November 2008 (age 17)	3	0	(Football Association of Indonesia) Persib Bandung

=== Recent call-ups ===
The following players have also been called up to the squad within the last 12 months.

Pos.	Player	Date of birth (age)	Caps	Goals	Club	Latest call-up
DF	Mathew Baker	13 May 2009 (age 17)	2	0	(Australia) Melbourne City	2026 ASEAN U-19 Boys' Championship, 1–13 June 2026
DF	Timothy Baker	3 May 2007 (age 19)	2	0	(Australia) Western United	2026 ASEAN U-19 Boys' Championship, 1–13 June 2026
DF	Rafa Abdurahman	20 August 2007 (age 19)	1	0	(Indonesia) Persija Jakarta	2026 ASEAN U-19 Boys' Championship, 1–13 June 2026
MF	Evandra Florasta	17 June 2008 (age 18)	8	1	(Indonesia) Bhayangkara Presisi Lampung	2026 ASEAN U-19 Boys' Championship, 1–13 June 2026
MF	Zinadein Ardiansyah	4 October 2007 (age 19)	2	0	(Australia) Sydney FC	2026 ASEAN U-19 Boys' Championship, 1–13 June 2026
FW	Dimas Adi Prasetyo	13 April 2008 (age 18)	5	2	(Indonesia) Persebaya Surabaya	2026 ASEAN U-19 Boys' Championship, 1–13 June 2026
Notes: ^{PRE} = Preliminary squad; ^{SUS} = Suspended; ^{INJ} = Withdrew from the roster due to an injury; ^{UNF} = Withdrew from the roster due to unfit condition; ^{RET} = Retired from the national team; ^{WD} = Withdrew from the roster for non-injury related reasons

== Results and fixtures ==
The following is a list of match results in the last 12 months, as well as any future matches that have been scheduled.

Win Draw Loss Fixture

=== 2026 ===
1 June 2026 ASEAN U-19 Boys' Championship	Indonesia	3–0	Myanmar	Deli Serdang, Indonesia
20:00 UTC+7	Arkhan 38'; Dimas 78', 87'	Report		Stadium: North Sumatra Stadium; Referee: Alimardon Bainazarov (Kyrgyzstan)

4 June 2026 ASEAN U-19 Boys' Championship	Timor-Leste	0–3	Indonesia	Deli Serdang, Indonesia
20:00 UTC+7		Report	Reno 42'; Irpan 62'; Arkhan 64'	Stadium: North Sumatra Stadium; Referee: Mohd Zulfiqar (Singapore)

7 June 2026 ASEAN U-19 Boys' Championship	Indonesia	2–1	Vietnam	Deli Serdang, Indonesia
20:00 UTC+7	Reno 22'; Evandra 90+1' (pen.)	Report	Nguyễn Quốc Khánh 74'	Stadium: North Sumatra Stadium; Referee: Ryo Tanimoto (Japan)

11 June 2026 ASEAN U-19 Boys' Championship SF	Indonesia	0–1	Australia	Deli Serdang, Indonesia
20:15 UTC+7		Report	Neil 89'	Stadium: North Sumatra Stadium; Referee: Alimardon Bainazarov (Kyrgyzstan)

13 June 2026 ASEAN U-19 Boys' Championship 3rd place	Cambodia	0–1	Indonesia	Deli Serdang, Indonesia
16:00 UTC+7		Report	Algazani 63'	Stadium: North Sumatra Stadium; Referee: Mohd Zulfiqar (Singapore)

21 August Friendly	Indonesia	0–0	United Arab Emirates	Bangkok, Thailand
--:-- UTC+7

22 August Friendly	Indonesia	1–2	Iraq	Bangkok, Thailand
--:-- UTC+7

31 August 2027 AFC U-20 Asian Cup qualification	Indonesia	0–0	Malaysia	Vientiane, Laos
16:00 UTC+7		Report		Stadium: New Laos National Stadium; Referee: Mohamed Deham (Bahrain)

3 September 2027 AFC U-20 Asian Cup qualification	Laos	0–3	Indonesia	Vientiane, Laos
19:00 UTC+7		Report	Fabio 5'; Gholy 40', 63'	Stadium: New Laos National Stadium; Referee: Wissam Rabie (Syria)

6 September 2027 AFC U-20 Asian Cup qualification	Australia	0–2	Indonesia	Vientiane, Laos
16:00 UTC+7		Report	Leeming 28'; Brkić 90'	Stadium: New Laos National Stadium; Referee: Omar Al-Yaqoubi (Oman)

1 October Friendly	China	2–1	Indonesia	Xianghe, China
15:00 UTC+8	Xie 21'; Zhu 48'	Report	Arkhan 37'	Stadium: National Football Training Centre

4 October Friendly	China	1–0	Indonesia	Xianghe, China
15:00 UTC+8	Wen 47'	Report		Stadium: National Football Training Centre

11 November Friendly	Jordan	2–0	Indonesia	Antalya, Türkiye
15:30 UTC+3	Al-Rabie 42'; Abu Mushref 47'	Report		Stadium: Regnum Football Center

17 November Friendly	Indonesia	0–0	United States	Antalya, Türkiye
--:-- UTC+3				Stadium: Regnum Football Center

== Competitive record ==
=== FIFA U-20 World Cup ===
FIFA U-20 World Cup record
Year	Round	Position	Pld	W	D	L	GF	GA
(Tunisia) 1977	Did not enter							
(Japan) 1979	Group stage	16th	3	0	0	3	0	16
(Australia) 1981	Did not qualify							
(Mexico) 1983	Did not qualify							
(Soviet Union) 1985	Did not qualify							
(Chile) 1987	Did not qualify							
(Saudi Arabia) 1989	Withdrew							
(Portugal) 1991	Did not qualify							
(Australia) 1993	Did not qualify							
(Qatar) 1995	Did not qualify							
(Malaysia) 1997	Did not qualify							
(Nigeria) 1999	Did not enter							
(Argentina) 2001	Did not qualify							
(United Arab Emirates) 2003	Did not qualify							
(Netherlands) 2005	Did not qualify							
(Canada) 2007	Did not qualify							
(Egypt) 2009	Did not qualify							
(Colombia) 2011	Did not qualify							
(Turkey) 2013	Did not qualify							
(New Zealand) 2015	Did not qualify							
(South Korea) 2017	Disqualified due to FIFA suspension							
(Poland) 2019	Did not qualify							
(Indonesia) ~~2021~~	Cancelled due to the COVID-19 pandemic							
(Argentina) 2023	Did not qualify							
(Chile) 2025	Did not qualify							
(Azerbaijan) (Uzbekistan) 2027	To be determined							
Total	Best: Group stage	1/25	3	0	0	3	0	16

Matches
Year	Round	Date	Opponent	Result	Stadium
(Japan) 1979	Group stage	26 August	Argentina	L 0–5	Omiya Stadium, Omiya
(Japan) 1979	Group stage	28 August	Poland	L 0–6	Omiya Stadium, Omiya
(Japan) 1979	Group stage	30 August	Yugoslavia	L 0–5	Omiya Stadium, Omiya

=== AFC U-20 Asian Cup ===
AFC U-20 Asian Cup record									Qualification					
Year	Round	Position	Pld	W	D	L	GF	GA	Pld	W	D	L	GF	GA
(Federation of Malaya) 1959	Did not enter								No qualification					
(Federation of Malaya) 1960	Fourth place	4th	4	2	0	2	16	10	No qualification					
(Thailand) 1961	Champions*	1st	5	2	3	0	7	4	No qualification					
(Thailand) 1962	Third place	3rd	5	3	1	1	9	4	No qualification					
(Federation of Malaya) 1963	Did not enter								No qualification					
(South Vietnam) 1964	Did not enter								No qualification					
(Japan) 1965	Did not enter								No qualification					
(Philippines) 1966	Did not enter								No qualification					
(Thailand) 1967	Runners-up	2nd	6	4	1	1	17	8	No qualification					
(South Korea) 1968	Did not enter								No qualification					
(Thailand) 1969	Group stage	10th	3	0	2	1	5	6	No qualification					
(Philippines) 1970	Runners-up	2nd	6	5	0	1	7	4	No qualification					
(Japan) 1971	Group stage	12th	3	0	1	2	1	4	No qualification					
(Thailand) 1972	Quarter-finals	8th	4	2	0	2	7	6	No qualification					
(Iran) 1973	Group stage	9th	3	1	0	2	10	5	No qualification					
(Thailand) 1974	Did not enter								No qualification					
(Kuwait) 1975	Group stage	15th	3	1	0	2	2	7	No qualification					
(Thailand) 1976	Quarter-finals	7th	4	1	2	1	5	3	No qualification					
(Iran) 1977	Did not enter								No qualification					
(Bangladesh) 1978	Quarter-finals	8th	4	2	0	2	6	6	No qualification					
(Thailand) 1980	Did not qualify								4	0	2	2	6	12
(Thailand) 1982	Did not qualify								4	1	0	3	9	13
(United Arab Emirates) 1985	Did not qualify								3	1	0	2	1	9
(Saudi Arabia) 1986	Group stage	7th	3	0	1	2	1	11	3	2	1	0	4	0
(Qatar) 1988	Withdrew								Withdrew					
(Indonesia) 1990	Group stage	8th	3	0	0	3	3	9	Qualified as host					
(United Arab Emirates) 1992	Did not qualify								4	3	0	1	4	2
(Indonesia) 1994	Group stage	6th	4	1	2	1	4	5	Qualified as host					
(South Korea) 1996	Did not qualify								3	1	1	1	8	5
(Thailand) 1998	Did not enter								Did not enter					
(Iran) 2000	Did not qualify								3	0	0	3	1	11
(Qatar) 2002	Did not qualify								3	2	1	0	5	0
(Malaysia) 2004	Group stage	16th	3	0	0	3	3	12	2	2	0	0	7	0
(India) 2006	Did not qualify								2	0	1	1	2	4
(Saudi Arabia) 2008	Did not qualify								4	2	0	2	14	5
(China) 2010	Did not qualify								5	2	1	2	10	9
(United Arab Emirates) 2012	Did not qualify								4	2	1	1	7	4
(Myanmar) 2014	Group stage	16th	3	0	0	3	2	8	3	3	0	0	9	2
(Bahrain) 2016	Disqualified due to FIFA suspension								Disqualified					
(Indonesia) 2018	Quarter-finals	5th	4	2	0	2	9	9	4	2	0	2	11	8
(Uzbekistan) ~~2020~~	Cancelled due to the COVID-19 pandemic								3	2	1	0	8	2
(Uzbekistan) 2023	Group stage	10th	3	1	1	1	1	2	3	3	0	0	12	3
(China) 2025	Group stage	12th	3	0	1	2	1	6	3	2	1	0	8	2
(China) 2027	Qualified								3	2	1	0	5	0
(China) 2029	To be determined								To be determined					
Total	Best: Champions	22/44	75	27	14	34	116	129	60	30	10	20	123	89

- (*): shared title

Other records
First match	Indonesia 9–3 Singapore (30 March 1960; Kuala Lumpur, Malaysia)
Biggest win	Indonesia 9–3 Singapore (30 March 1960; Kuala Lumpur, Malaysia)
Biggest defeat	Saudi Arabia 7–0 Indonesia (3 December 1986; Riyadh, Saudi Arabia)

=== ASEAN U-19 Boys Championship ===
ASEAN U-19 Boys Championship record
Year	Round	Position	Pld	W	D	L	GF	GA
(Cambodia) (Thailand) 2002	Group stage	9th	4	0	1	3	5	11
(Myanmar) (Vietnam) 2003	Group stage	6th	4	2	0	2	3	6
(Indonesia) 2005	Group stage	5th	4	2	1	1	13	8
(Malaysia) 2006	Did not enter							
(Vietnam) 2007	Did not enter							
(Thailand) 2008	Did not enter							
(Vietnam) 2009	Did not enter							
(Vietnam) 2010	Did not enter							
(Myanmar) 2011	Group stage	6th	4	1	1	2	14	10
(Vietnam) 2012	Did not enter							
(Indonesia) 2013	Champions	1st	7	4	2	1	14	5
(Vietnam) 2014	Group stage	6th	2	0	0	2	2	9
(Laos) 2015	Disqualified due to FIFA suspension							
(Vietnam) 2016	Group stage	7th	5	2	0	3	12	13
(Myanmar) 2017	Third place	3rd	6	4	1	1	26	5
(Indonesia) 2018	Third place	3rd	7	5	1	1	14	5
(Vietnam) 2019	Third place	3rd	7	5	1	1	28	7
(Indonesia) 2022	Group stage	5th	5	3	2	0	17	2
(Indonesia) 2024	Champions	1st	5	5	0	0	16	2
(Indonesia) 2026	Third place	3rd	5	4	0	1	9	2
Total	Best: Champions	13/20	65	37	10	18	173	86

Other records
First match	Thailand 3–1 Indonesia (24 January 2002; Bangkok, Thailand)
Biggest win	Brunei 0–10 Indonesia (14 September 2011; Yangon, Myanmar)
Biggest defeat	Indonesia 1–6 Vietnam (12 September 2011; Yangon, Myanmar)

=== Exhibition ===
Exhibition game
Year	Tournament	Round	Position	GP	W	D	L	GS	GA
2013	(Hong Kong) HKFA Int. Youth Football Invitation	Champions	1st	3	1	2	0	4	2
2014	(Brunei) Hassanal Bolkiah Trophy	Group stage	7th	5	1	1	3	9	8
2017	(France) Toulon Tournament	Group stage	11th	3	0	0	3	1	5
2018	(Indonesia) PSSI Invitation 2018	Third place	3rd	2	0	1	1	2	5
2022	(France) Toulon Tournament	Group stage	10th	4	1	1	2	2	4
2023	(Indonesia) 2023 PSSI U-20 Mini Tournament	Third place	3rd	3	1	0	2	5	3
2024	(France) Maurice Revello Tournament	Tenth place	10th	5	0	0	5	2	14

== Honours ==
=== Continental ===
- AFC U-20 Asian Cup
  - (gold) Champions (1): 1961
  - (silver) Runners-up (2): 1967, 1970
  - (bronze) Third place (1): 1962

=== Regional ===
- ASEAN U-19 Boys' Championship
  - (gold) Champions (2): 2013, 2024
  - (bronze) Third place (4): 2017, 2018, 2019, 2026

=== Exhibition tournaments ===
- HKFA International Youth Football Invitation Tournament
  - (gold) Champions (1): 2013
- Seoul Earth On Us Cup
  - Fourth place (1): 2024

== See also ==
- Indonesia national football team
- Indonesia women's national football team
- Indonesia national under-23 football team
- Indonesia national under-21 football team
- Indonesia national under-17 football team
- Indonesia women's national under-20 football team
- Indonesia women's national under-17 football team
