= 1972 AFC Youth Championship =

Tournament details
- Host country: Thailand
- Dates: 14–30 April
- Teams: 17

Final positions
- Champions: Israel (6th title)
- Runners-up: South Korea
- Third place: Iran
- Fourth place: Thailand

The 1972 AFC Youth Championship was held in Bangkok, Thailand.

== Teams ==
The following teams entered the tournament:

- Brunei
- Burma
- Hong Kong
- India
- Indonesia
- Iran
- Israel
- Japan
- Khmer Republic
- Laos
- Malaysia
- Nepal
- Philippines
- Singapore
- South Korea
- Taiwan
- Thailand (host)

== Group stage ==
=== Group A ===
Teams	Pld	W	D	L	GF	GA	GD	Pts
Israel	3	3	0	0	15	0	+15	6
Thailand	3	2	0	1	9	2	+7	4
India	3	1	0	2	8	11	–3	2
Nepal	3	0	0	3	0	19	–19	0

14 April	Thailand	5–0	Nepal
16 April	Israel	7–0	India
19 April	Thailand	4–1	India
20 April	Nepal	0–7	Israel
22 April	Thailand	0–1	Israel
23 April	Nepal	0–7	India

=== Group B ===
Teams	Pld	W	D	L	GF	GA	GD	Pts
Japan	4	2	2	0	11	3	+8	6
Singapore	4	3	0	1	10	3	+7	6
Malaysia	4	2	1	1	16	3	+13	5
Hong Kong	4	1	1	2	15	7	+8	3
Brunei	4	0	0	4	0	36	–36	0

15 April	Japan	3–0	Singapore
	Malaysia	11–0	Brunei
17 April	Singapore	8–0	Brunei
	Hong Kong	2–2	Japan
19 April	Japan	1–1	Malaysia
	Hong Kong	0–1	Singapore
21 April	Malaysia	4–1	Hong Kong
	Japan	5–0	Brunei
23 April	Singapore	1–0	Malaysia
	Hong Kong	12–0	Brunei

=== Group C ===
Teams	Pld	W	D	L	GF	GA	GD	Pts
Burma	3	3	0	0	12	0	+12	6
Indonesia	3	2	0	1	6	4	+2	4
Taiwan	3	0	1	2	1	7	–6	1
Khmer Republic	3	0	1	2	0	8	–8	1

16 April	Burma	5–0	Khmer Republic
	Indonesia	3–1	Taiwan
18 April	Taiwan	0–0	Khmer Republic
20 April	Indonesia	0–3	Burma
22 April	Burma	4–0	Taiwan
24 April	Indonesia	3–0	Khmer Republic

=== Group D ===
Teams	Pld	W	D	L	GF	GA	GD	Pts
South Korea	3	2	1	0	5	1	+4	5
Iran	3	2	0	1	6	1	+5	4
Laos	3	1	1	1	4	4	0	3
Philippines	3	0	0	3	1	10	–9	0

14 April	South Korea	0–0	Laos
15 April	Iran	2–0	Philippines
17 April	Iran	4–0	Laos
19 April	Laos	4–0	Philippines
21 April	Iran	0–1	South Korea
24 April	South Korea	4–1	Philippines

== Quarterfinals ==
25 April 1972

Israel	3–0	Singapore

Bangkok
25 April 1972

Japan	1–2	Thailand

Bangkok
26 April 1972

Burma	0–2 (Note: The match was abandoned in the 50th minute with Burma leading 2–1 after Burma had five players sent off following a brawl; Iran were awarded a 2–0 victory.)	Iran

Bangkok
26 April 1972

Indonesia	1–2	South Korea

Bangkok

== Semifinals ==
28 April 1972

Israel	1–0	Iran

Bangkok
28 April 1972

Thailand	0–1	South Korea

Bangkok

== Third place match ==
30 April 1972

Iran	3–0	Thailand

Bangkok

== Final ==
30 April 1972

Israel	1–0	South Korea
Yoel Massuari 58'

Bangkok

1972 AFC Youth Championship

Israel
Sixth title
