= Salampessy =

Salampessy is a Moluccan surname. Notable people with the surname include:

- Reno Salampessy (born 2007), Indonesian footballer
- Ricardo Salampessy (born 1984), Indonesian footballer
