= Thailand national under-20 football team =

Thailand Under-20
- Nickname(s): ช้างศึก (The War Elephants)
- Association: Football Association of Thailand
- Confederation: AFC (Asia)
- Sub-confederation: AFF (Southeast Asia)
- Head coach: Jukkapant Punpee
- Home stadium: Rajamangala Stadium
- FIFA code: THA
First colours	Second colours	Third colours

Biggest win
- Thailand 21–0 Northern Mariana Islands (Phnom Penh, Cambodia; 6 November 2019)

Biggest defeat
- Thailand 1–8 South Korea (Dubai, United Arab Emirates; 24 September 1992)

AFC U-20 Asian Cup
- Appearances: 24 (first in 1960)
- Best result: Champions (1962, 1969)

The Thailand national under-20 football team (Thai: ฟุตบอลทีมชาติไทยรุ่นอายุไม่เกิน 20 ปี, RTGS: futbon thim chat thai run ayu mai koen yi sip pi) is the national team for the under-20 and 19 level, representing Thailand in international football competitions in the FIFA U-20 World Cup, AFC U-20 Asian Cup and AFF U-19 Youth Championship. It is controlled by the Football Association of Thailand.

Thailand is a two-time AFC champions and four-time AFF champions. Thailand has never managed to qualify for the FIFA U-20 World Cup, but the under-17 national team has done so.

== Results and fixtures ==
Win Draw Lose

=== 2026 ===
2 June 2026 ASEAN U-19 Boys' Championship	Thailand	9–0	Brunei	Medan, Indonesia
20:00 UTC+7	Itthimon 7'; Pattaratron 24', 26', 36'; Pichaya 40' (pen.); Siwakorn 49', 52'; Kongnat 69'; Natthakit 89'	Report		Stadium: Teladan Stadium; Referee: Jon Mick Pineda (Philippines)

5 June 2026 ASEAN U-19 Boys' Championship	Singapore	0–4	Thailand	Medan, Indonesia
20:00 UTC+7		Report	Pirada 27'; Natthakit 40'; Sirisaran 72'; Ratchanon 90+2'	Stadium: Teladan Stadium; Referee: Naufal Adya Fairuski (Indonesia)

8 June 2026 ASEAN U-19 Boys' Championship	Thailand	3–2	Malaysia	Deli Serdang, Indonesia
20:00 UTC+7	Pichaiya 21', 79' (pen.); Pirada 42'		Amar 13'; Arsyad 45+3'	Stadium: Madya North Sumatra Stadium; Referee: Alimardon Bainazarov (Kyrgyzstan)

11 June 2026 ASEAN U-19 Boys' Championship SF	Thailand	4–0	Cambodia	Deli Serdang, Indonesia
16:00	Natthakit 32'; Itthimon 45+1', 80'; Sean 88' (o.g.)			Stadium: North Sumatra Stadium

13 June 2026 ASEAN U-19 Boys' Championship Final	Thailand	0–2	Australia	Deli Serdang, Indonesia
20:15		Report	Garbowski 41'; Baker 90+7'	Stadium: North Sumatra Stadium; Referee: Naufal Adya Fairuski (Indonesia)

19 August Friendly	Thailand	0–2	Iran	Chonburi, Thailand
16:00				Stadium: Chonburi Stadium

31 August 2027 AFC U-20 Asian Cup Q	Thailand	1–0	United Arab Emirates	Chonburi, Thailand
19:30	Siwakorn 45+1'	Report		Stadium: Chonburi Stadium; Referee: Feras Taweel (Syria)

3 September 2027 AFC U-20 Asian Cup Q	Turkmenistan	0–1	Thailand	Chonburi, Thailand
19:30		Report	Siwa 56'	Stadium: Chonburi Stadium; Referee: Aditya Purkayastha (India)

6 September 2027 AFC U-20 Asian Cup Q	Iraq	3–1	Thailand	Chonburi, Thailand
19:30	Malik 10', 45'; Hasan 19'	Report	Chantawat 86'	Stadium: Chonburi Stadium; Referee: Ahmad Alaeddin (Lebanon)

=== Previous squads ===
AFC U-20 Asian Cup

- 2008 AFC U-19 Championship squad
- 2010 AFC U-19 Championship squad
- 2012 AFC U-19 Championship squad
- 2014 AFC U-19 Championship squad
- 2016 AFC U-19 Championship squad
- 2018 AFC U-19 Championship squad
- 2025 AFC U-20 Asian Cup squad

AFF U19 Youth Championship

- 2014 AFF U-19 Youth Championship squad
- 2015 AFF U-19 Youth Championship squad
- 2016 AFF U-19 Youth Championship squad
- 2017 AFF U-18 Youth Championship squad
- 2018 AFF U-19 Youth Championship squad
- 2019 AFF U-18 Youth Championship squad
- 2022 AFF U-19 Youth Championship squad
- 2024 ASEAN U-19 Youth Championship squad
- 2026 ASEAN U-19 Youth Championship squad

== Players ==
=== Current squad ===
The following 23 players for the 2026 ASEAN U-19 Boys' Championship.

No.	Pos.	Player	Date of birth (age)	Caps	Goals	Club
	GK	Poomraphee Siribunyakul	23 July 2008 (age 18)	0	0	(Japan Football Association) Kashima Gakuen High School
	GK	Rangsiman Kemmueang	16 January 2008 (age 18)	0	0	(Football Association of Thailand) Port FC
	GK	Suphakorn Poolphol	25 September 2008 (age 18)	0	0	(Football Association of Thailand) Nongbua Pitchaya
	DF	Wichan Inaram	20 July 2007 (age 19)	0	0	(Football Association of Thailand) Bangkok United
	DF	Phurich Subhensawang	1 February 2007 (age 19)	0	0	(Football Association of Thailand) Bangkok United
	DF	Surachai Booncharee	26 April 2007 (age 19)	0	0	(Football Association of Thailand) Bangkok United
	DF	Jeerapong Chamsakul	4 January 2007 (age 19)	0	0	(Football Association of Thailand) Bangbeung
	DF	Supanat Mahawai	12 April 2007 (age 19)	0	0	(Football Association of Thailand) Buriram United
	DF	Theerathep Thongkham		0	0	(Football Association of Thailand) Hornbill Junior
	DF	Apiwich Laorkhai	22 February 2007 (age 19)	0	0	(Football Association of Thailand) Burapha United
	DF	Punyapop Khunsri		0	0	(Football Association of Thailand) Suankularb Wittayalai School
	MF	Danuphon Buppha	15 January 2008 (age 18)	0	0	(Football Association of Thailand) Muangthong United
	MF	David Songsampao		0	0	(Football Association of Thailand) Hua Hin City
	MF	Ratchanon Kochaseni		0	0	(Football Association of Thailand) Buriram United
	MF	Pichaya Kongsri	3 August 2007 (age 19)	0	0	(Football Association of Thailand) Bangkok United
	MF	Pattaratron Buransuk	24 October 2007 (age 19)	0	0	(Football Association of Thailand) Nongbua Pitchaya
	MF	Pirada Larsawat	9 May 2008 (age 18)	0	0	(Football Association of Thailand) Prime Bangkok
	FW	Witthawat Phraothaisong	21 April 2007 (age 19)	0	0	(Football Association of Thailand) BG Pathum United
	FW	Itthimon Tippanet	30 November 2007 (age 18)	0	0	(Football Association of Thailand) BG Pathum United
	FW	Siwakorn Ponsan	24 January 2008 (age 18)	0	0	(Football Association of Thailand) BG Pathum United
	FW	Kongnat Thuamthongdee	25 January 2007 (age 19)	0	0	(Football Association of Thailand) Chamchuri United
	FW	Natthakit Phosri	8 February 2008 (age 18)	0	0	(Football Association of Thailand) Port FC
	FW	Sirisaran Chanjaemsai		0	0	(Football Association of Thailand) Assumption United

=== Recent call-ups ===
The following players have also been called up in the last 12 months to the Thailand squad.

Pos.	Player	Date of birth (age)	Caps	Goals	Club	Latest call-up
^{INJ} Withdrew from the squad due to injury^{PRE} Included in the Preliminary squad or on standby^{RET} Retired from the national team^{SUS} Serving suspension from the national team^{WD} Withdrew from the squad due to non-injury issue

== Coaching staff ==
Position	Name
Head coach	Jukkapant Punpee
Assistant coach	Sarawut Janthapan
Assistant coach	Sumet Yotoo
Assistant coach	Prasit Taodee
Goalkeeping coach	Songwut Khamfung
Match analyst	Poompat Kotchawat
Kit manager	Chusak Phakdeedamrongrat
Doctor	Keerati Surakarn
Doctor	Phakphon Issarakraisil
Physiotherapists	Suwicha Noradee
Masseur	Songwut Khamfung
Masseur	Amnuay Saklebpradu
Team coordinator	Chonlachart Siripanich

== Managers ==
Thailand national under-20 football team head coaches
Name	Country	Period	Honours
Chatchai Paholpat	Thailand	1994–1996	1994 AFC Youth Championship – Third place 1996 AFC Youth Championship – Group stage
Charnwit Polcheewin	Thailand	1998–2000 and 2002	1998 AFC Youth Championship – Group stage 2000 AFC Youth Championship – Group stage 2002 AFC Youth Championship – Group stage 2002 AFF U-20 Youth Championship – Winners
Carlos Roberto	Brazil	2003	2003 Ho Chi Minh City Football Cup
Charnwit Polcheewin	Thailand	2004	2004 AFC Youth Championship – Group stage
Phayong Khunnaen	Thailand	2005–2006	2006 AFC Youth Championship – Group stage
Kawin Kachendecha	Thailand	2007–2008	2007 AFF U-20 Youth Championship – Third place 2008 AFC U-19 Championship – Group stage
Chalermwoot Sa-ngapol	Thailand	2009–2010	2009 AFF U-19 Youth Championship – Winners; 2010 AFC U-19 Championship – Group stage 2010 AFF U-19 Youth Championship – Runner-up
Somchai Chuayboonchum	Thailand	2011	2011 AFF U-19 Youth Championship – Winners
Arjhan Srong-ngamsub	Thailand	2012	2012 AFC U-19 Championship – Group stage
Jirasak Jaroenchand	Thailand	2013	
Somchai Chuayboonchum	Thailand	2013	
Sasom Pobprasert	Thailand	2014	2014 Hassanal Bolkiah Trophy – Semi-finals; 2014 AFF U-19 Youth Championship – Third place 2014 AFC U-19 Championship – Quarter-finals
Anurak Srikerd	Thailand	2015	2015 AFF U-19 Youth Championship – Winners
Chalermwoot Sa-ngapol	Thailand	2016	
Anurak Srikerd	Thailand	2016	2016 AFF U-19 Youth Championship – Runner-up; 2016 AFC U-19 Championship – Group stage
Jatuporn Pramualban (interim)	Thailand	2017	Jockey Club International Youth Tournament – Winners
Marc Alavedra	Spain	2017–2018	2017 AFF U-18 Youth Championship – Winners
Issara Sritaro	Thailand	2018–2019	2018 AFF U-19 Youth Championship – 4th place 2018 AFC U-19 Championship – Quarter-finals; 2019 AFF U-18 Youth Championship – Group stage
Bamrung Boonprom (interim)	Thailand	2019	GSB Bangkok Cup 2019 – 4th place
Salvador Valero Garcia	Spain	2020–2022	2022 AFF U-19 Youth Championship – 4th place
Milos Velebit	Serbia	2022–2023	
Toshiya Miura	Japan	2023	
Yuki Richard Stalph	Japan	2023–2024	
Emerson Pereira	Brazil	2024–2025	2024 ASEAN U-19 Boys Championship – Runner-up; 2025 AFC U-20 Asian Cup – Group stage
Jukkapant Punpee	Thailand	2026–	2026 ASEAN U-19 Boys Championship – Runner-up

== Achievements ==
=== FIFA U-20 World Cup record ===
FIFA U-20 World Cup finals record										Qualifications record					
Year	Host country	Result	Position	GP	W	D*	L	GS	GA	GP	W	D	L	GS	GA
1977	Tunisia	Did not enter								Did not enter					
1979	Japan	Did not enter								Did not enter					
1981	Australia	Did not qualify								8	3	1	4	17	8
1983	Mexico	Did not qualify								4	3	1	0	20	5
1985	Soviet Union	Did not qualify								6	2	1	3	9	15
1987	Chile	Did not qualify								3	1	1	1	3	2
1989	Saudi Arabia	Did not qualify								6	3	1	2	26	5
1991	Portugal	Did not qualify								N/A					
1993	Australia	Did not qualify								8	4	1	3	11	14
1995	Qatar	Did not qualify								8	4	2	2	19	6
1997	Malaysia	Did not qualify								7	4	1	2	27	8
1999	Nigeria	Did not qualify								4	1	3	0	6	2
2001	Argentina	Did not qualify								7	2	2	3	25	16
2003	United Arab Emirates	Did not qualify								6	2	2	2	17	8
2005	Netherlands	Did not qualify								5	3	1	1	7	4
2007	Canada	Did not qualify								5	3	0	2	8	6
2009	Egypt	Did not qualify								8	5	0	3	15	7
2011	Colombia	Did not qualify								8	4	1	3	10	5
2013	Turkey	Did not qualify								7	4	1	2	18	6
2015	New Zealand	Did not qualify								7	4	0	3	16	10
2017	South Korea	Did not qualify								7	3	0	4	17	12
2019	Poland	Did not qualify								7	3	1	3	18	19
~~2021~~	Indonesia	Did not qualify and cancelled								4	2	0	2	31	3
2023	Argentina	Did not qualify								3	2	0	1	6	3
2025	Chile	Did not qualify								6	2	1	3	21	10
2027	AzerbaijanUzbekistan	To be determined													
Total		0/25		-	-	-	-	-	-	134	64	21	49	347	174

Note

- *: Denotes draws including knockout matches decided on penalty kicks.

=== AFC U-20 Asian Cup record ===
AFC U-20 Asian Cup finals record										Qualification record					
Year	Host country	Result	Position	GP	W	D*	L	GF	GA	GP	W	D	L	GF	GA
1959	Malaya	Consolation group	5th	6	4	1	1	17	8	No qualifications					
1960	Malaya	Group stage	6th	3	1	0	2	4	9	No qualifications					
1961	Thailand	Third place	3rd	5	4	0	1	14	6	No qualifications					
1962	Thailand	Champions	1st	6	4	2	0	7	3	No qualifications					
1963	Malaya	Third place	3rd	6	3	1	2	15	8	No qualifications					
1964	South Vietnam	Group stage	8th	3	0	1	2	1	7	No qualifications					
1965	Japan	Group stage	6th	4	1	1	2	1	3	No qualifications					
1966	Philippines	Third place	3rd	6	3	2	1	9	4	No qualifications					
1967	Thailand	Quarter-finals	5th	3	2	0	1	12	1	No qualifications					
1968	South Korea	Second round	6th	5	1	1	3	7	10	No qualifications					
1969	Thailand	Champions	1st	5	4	1	0	18	4	No qualifications					
1970	Philippines	Group stage	10th	3	1	0	2	12	4	No qualifications					
1971	Japan	Group stage	13th	3	0	1	2	1	6	No qualifications					
1972	Thailand	Fourth place	4th	6	3	0	3	11	7	No qualifications					
1973	Iran	Quarter-finals	6th	3	1	1	1	5	2	No qualifications					
1974	Thailand	Fourth place	4th	6	4	0	2	15	4	No qualifications					
1975	Kuwait	Did not enter								No qualifications					
1976	Thailand	Third place	3rd	7	2	2	3	8	8	No qualifications					
1977	Iran	Did not enter								No qualifications					
1978	Bangladesh	Did not enter								No qualifications					
1980	Thailand	Round-robin	4th	4	1	0	3	6	5	4	2	1	1	11	5
1982	Thailand	Did not qualify								6	3	0	3	21	10
1985	United Arab Emirates	Round-robin	4th	3	0	0	3	3	13	5	2	2	1	7	4
1986	Saudi Arabia	Did not qualify								3	1	1	1	3	2
1988	Qatar	Did not qualify								6	3	1	2	26	5
1990	Indonesia	Did not qualify								N/A					
1992	United Arab Emirates	Group stage	8th	4	1	0	3	5	13	4	3	1	0	6	1
1994	Indonesia	Third place	3rd	6	3	1	2	9	6	2	2	0	0	10	0
1996	South Korea	Group stage	6th	4	1	1	2	3	7	3	3	0	0	24	1
1998	Thailand	Group stage	5th	4	1	3	0	6	2	Qualified as host					
2000	Iran	Group stage	9th	4	0	1	3	4	13	3	2	1	0	21	3
2002	Qatar	Group stage	5th	3	0	1	2	2	7	3	2	1	0	15	1
2004	Malaysia	Group stage	10th	3	1	1	1	3	4	2	2	0	0	4	0
2006	India	Group stage	10th	3	1	0	2	3	5	2	2	0	0	5	1
2008	Saudi Arabia	Group stage	11th	3	1	0	2	3	4	5	4	0	1	12	3
2010	China	Group stage	13th	3	0	1	2	1	3	5	4	0	1	9	2
2012	United Arab Emirates	Group stage	13th	3	1	0	2	3	6	4	3	1	0	15	0
2014	Myanmar	Quarter-finals	6th	4	2	0	2	6	8	3	2	0	1	10	2
2016	Bahrain	Group stage	15th	3	0	0	3	3	10	4	3	0	1	14	2
2018	Indonesia	Quarter-finals	8th	4	1	1	2	9	14	3	2	0	1	9	5
~~2020~~	Uzbekistan	Did not qualify and cancelled								4	2	0	2	31	3
2023	Uzbekistan	Did not qualify								3	2	0	1	6	3
2025	China	Group stage	14th	3	0	1	2	3	9	3	2	0	1	18	1
2027	China	Qualified								3	2	0	1	3	3
Total		32/39	Best: 1st	141	52	25	64	230	223	80	53	9	18	278	57

Note

- *: Denotes draws including knockout matches decided on penalty kicks.

AFC U–20 Asian Cup history
First Match	Philippines 2–3 Thailand (18 April 1959; Kuala Lumpur, Malaysia)
Biggest Win	Thailand 10–0 Brunei (23 April 1970; Manila, Philippines)
Biggest Defeat	South Korea 8–1 Thailand (24 September 1992; Dubai, United Arab Emirates)
Best Result	Champions at the 1962 and 1969
Worst Result	Group stage at the 17 editions

=== AFF U-19 Championship ===
AFF U-19 Youth Championship record
Year	Host country	Result	Position	GP	W	D*	L	GS	GA
2002^{1}	Thailand; Cambodia	Champions	1st	6	5	1	0	24	6
2005^{1}	Indonesia	Group stage	7th	4	2	0	2	13	6
2006^{1}	Malaysia	Third place	3rd	3	1	0	2	3	6
2007^{1}	Vietnam	Third place	3rd	5	3	1	1	18	3
2008	Thailand	Fourth place	4th	4	1	0	3	4	6
2009	Vietnam	Champions	1st	5	3	2	0	8	3
2010	Vietnam	Runners-up	2nd	4	0	3	1	2	3
2011	Myanmar	Champions	1st	6	5	1	0	17	2
2012	Vietnam	Did not enter							
2013	Indonesia	Group stage	9th	5	1	1	3	16	12
2014	Vietnam	Third place	3rd	4	2	0	2	9	6
2015	Laos	Champions	1st	6	6	0	0	29	2
2016	Vietnam	Runners-up	2nd	7	6	0	1	16	12
2017	Myanmar	Champions	1st	7	5	2	0	11	2
2018	Indonesia	Fourth place	4th	7	4	1	2	17	4
2019	Vietnam	Group stage	9th	5	1	2	2	6	8
2022	Indonesia	Fourth place	4th	7	3	3	1	8	4
2024	Indonesia	Runners-up	2nd	5	3	1	1	10	3
2026	Indonesia	Runners-up	2nd	5	4	0	1	20	4
Total		18/19	Best: 1st	95	55	18	22	231	92

Note

- ^{1} : The under-20 national team played at the 2002 to 2007 editions.
- * : Denotes draws including knockout matches decided on penalty kicks.

AFF U-19 Championship history
First Match	Thailand 5–1 Singapore (23 January 2002; Bangkok, Thailand)
Biggest Win	Brunei 1–10 Thailand (11 August 2005; Palembang, Indonesia)
Biggest Defeat	Australia 5–1 Thailand (24 September 2016; Hanoi, Vietnam)
Best Result	Champions at the 2002, 2009, 2011, 2015 and 2017
Worst Result	Group stage at the 2005, 2013 and 2019

== Honours ==
This is a list of honours for the Thailand national under-20 football team.

=== Continental titles ===
- AFC U-19 Championship
  - Winners (2): 1962, 1969
  - Third place (5): 1961, 1963, 1966, 1976, 1994

=== Regional titles ===
- AFF U-19 Youth Championship
  - Winners (5): 2002, 2009, 2011, 2015, 2017
  - Runners-up (3): 2010, 2016, 2024
  - Third place (3): 2006, 2007, 2014

=== Others ===
- Hassanal Bolkiah Trophy
  - Winners (2): 2005, 2007
  - Runners-up (1): 2002
- POMIS Cup
  - Winners (1): 1998
- Jockey Club International Youth Tournament
  - Winners (1): 2017
- International U-19 Thanh Niên Newspaper Cup
  - Third place (3): 2022

== See also ==
- Thailand national football team
- Thailand women's national football team
- Thailand national under-23 football team
- Thailand national under-21 football team
- Thailand national under-17 football team
- Thailand national under-15 football team
