= Azri Danial Yusra =

Bruneian footballer

Azri Danial
Personal information
- Full name: Mohamad Azri Danial bin Haji Mohamad Yusra
- Date of birth: 25 August 2008 (age 18)
- Place of birth: Brunei
- Position: Defender

Team information
- Current team: DPMM FC II
- Number: 55

Youth career
- PIP
- 2023–2025: Sports School
- 2025–: DPMM

Senior career*
| Years | Team | Apps | (Gls) |
| 2026– | DPMM II | 3 | (0) |

International career^{‡}
| 2024 | Brunei U17 | 6 | (0) |
| 2026– | Brunei U20 | 5 | (0) |
| 2026– | Brunei | 2 | (0) |
- * Club domestic league appearances and goals as of 17 November 2026 ‡ National team caps and goals as of 17 November 2026

Mohamad Azri Danial bin Haji Mohamad Yusra (born 25 August 2008) is a Bruneian footballer who plays for Brunei Super League team DPMM FC II and the Brunei national football team as a defender.

== Club career ==
Azri was a trainee with Projek Ikan Pusu, a grassroots academy attended by his elder brothers Azhari and Azrin. In 2023, he represented and captained Brunei Sports School at the 2023 Brunei Under-15 Youth League. He joined the under-18 team of DPMM FC in 2025, and managed to win the 2025–26 Brunei Under-18 Youth League in January 2026.

In August 2026, DPMM reformed their second team in the 2026–27 Brunei Super League season and head coach Subhi Bakir listed Azri as a squad member of the league team, uniting him with brother Azrin.

== International career ==
=== Youth ===
Azri was first involved with Tabuan Muda at the 2024 ASEAN U-16 Boys Championship held in Surakarta, Indonesia. He made his debut in a 15–0 loss against Vietnam on 22 June. He made two further appearances which were heavy losses against Myanmar and Cambodia. The following October, Azri played with the under-17s at the 2025 AFC U-17 Asian Cup qualification, making three appearances in as many defeats.

In June 2026, Azri was selected for the Brunei under-19s competing at the 2026 ASEAN U-19 Boys' Championship hosted by Indonesia. He made his first appearance in Brunei's second group game against Malaysia in a 4–0 loss. He also started the final game for the Young Wasps, which was a 4–0 defeat to Singapore. The following September, Azri was also involved with the Young Wasps at the 2027 AFC U-20 Asian Cup qualification where they were grouped with Maldives, Sri Lanka and the hosts Myanmar, making 3 appearances as vice-captain.

=== Senior ===
In November 2026, Azri joined up with the full international squad to Sisaket, Thailand for the 2026 King's Cup. In the first game against the hosts on the 14th, Azri was brought on by Helme Panjang in the late stages of the game, which finished 6–0 to Thailand. Three days later, he was utilised in the same capacity in a 0–7 hammering by Oman.

== Career statistics ==
As of 17 November 2026

| Club | Season | League | | | Cup | | Other | | Total | |
| Club | Season | Division | Apps | Goals | Apps | Goals | Apps | Goals | Apps | Goals |
|---|---|---|---|---|---|---|---|---|---|---|
| DPMM II | 2026–27 | Brunei Super League | 3 | 0 | 0 | 0 | 0 | 0 | 3 | 0 |
| Career total | | | 3 | 0 | 0 | 0 | 0 | 0 | 3 | 0 |

== Personal life ==
Azri's eldest brother Azhari Danial is a forward who plays for Indera SC. His other brother Azrin Danial is also a defender who is his teammate at DPMM II.
