= Amar Brkić =

Indonesian footballer (born 2007)

Personal information
- Full name: Amar Rayhan Brkić
- Date of birth: 11 June 2007 (age 19)
- Place of birth: Frankfurt, Germany
- Height: 1.66 m (5 ft 5 in)
- Position: Winger

Team information
- Current team: Borneo Samarinda
- Number: 11

Youth career
- Blau-Gelb Frankfurt
- –2021: Rot-Weiss Frankfurt
- 2021–2022: Kickers Offenbach
- 2022–2024: TSG 1899 Hoffenheim
- 2024–2026: Darmstadt 98 U19

Senior career*
Years	Team	Apps	(Gls)
2026–	Borneo Samarinda	3	(0)

International career^{‡}
2023	Indonesia U17	2	(0)
2026–	Indonesia U20	7	(1)
- * Club domestic league appearances and goals as of 7 November 2026 ‡ National team caps and goals as of 6 September 2026

Amar Rayhan Brkić (born 11 June 2007) is a footballer who plays as a winger for Super League club Borneo Samarinda. Born in Germany, he is a youth international for Indonesia.

== Early and personal life ==
Brkić was born in Frankfurt, Germany to a Bosnian father and Indonesian mother from Kebumen. Both of his parents are doctors; his mother is a paediatrician, and serves as chairwoman of the Special Branch of Muhammadiyah in Germany. His brother, Said Aalim, is also a footballer, and plays in the academy of Eintracht Frankfurt.

== Club career ==
Having started his career with local Frankfurt clubs Blau-Gelb Frankfurt and Rot-Weiss Frankfurt, he played for Kickers Offenbach before joining the academy of Hoffenheim in 2022.

On 23 September 2026, Brkić joined the Indonesia Super League club, Borneo Samarinda. On 18 October 2026, Brkić made his first-team debut for Borneo in their AFC Challenge League match against Burmese club Yangon United, coming on as a starter. Three days later, coming on as a substituted, Brkić scored his first professional goal and helped Borneo to a 3–1 victory over Tainan City in the group stage of the AFC Challenge League. At 19 years, 4 months, and 10 days old, the goal broke the 13-year-old record previously held by Hendra Bayauw in 2013, making Brkić the youngest Indonesian player to score in an Asian club competition.

== International career ==
Brkić is eligible to represent Germany, Bosnia and Herzegovina and Indonesia at international level. In October 2023, he was invited by Indonesia under-17 coach Bima Sakti to a training camp in his native Germany. Despite not yet finalising his paperwork, he was quoted as saying that he had "mixed feelings", but he was "happy of course because [he] will be playing in the U-17 World Cup for [his] country, Indonesia." During the training camp, he scored in a 1–1 friendly draw with the under-17 side of SV Meppen.

He was called up to the Indonesia under-17 squad again for the 2023 FIFA U-17 World Cup, being one of two overseas players called up, the other being half-Brazilian Welber Jardim.

== Honours ==
Indonesia U20

- ASEAN U-19 Boys Championship third-place: 2026
