= Luka Jordy Hodak =

Malaysian footballer (born 2008)

Personal information
- Date of birth: 30 September 2008 (age 18)
- Place of birth: Malaysia
- Positions: Midfielder; winger

Team information
- Current team: NK Trnje

Youth career
- –2023: NK Trnje
- 2023–2024: NK Kustošija
- 2024: NK Ponikve
- 2025–: NK Trnje

International career^{‡}
Years	Team	Apps	(Gls)
2026–	Malaysia U19	1	(0)
- ‡ National team caps and goals as of 8 June 2026

Luka Jordy Hodak (born 30 September 2008) is a Malaysian footballer who plays as a midfielder or winger for NK Trnje.

== Early life ==
Hodak was born on 30 September 2008. Born in Malaysia, he was born to Croatian footballer Bojan Hodak and a Malaysian mother. At the age of seven, he moved with his family to Croatia.

== Club career ==
As a youth player, Hodak joined the youth academy of Croatian side NK Trnje. Following his stint there, he joined the youth academy of Croatian side NK Kustošija in 2023. One year later, he joined the youth academy of Croatian side NK Ponikve, before returning to the youth academy of Croatian side NK Trnje in 2025.

== International career ==
Hodak is a Malaysia youth international. During the summer of 2026, he played for the Malaysia national under-19 football team at the 2026 ASEAN U-19 Boys' Championship.
