= Brunei national under-19 football team =

National association football team

Brunei Under-19
- Nickname(s): Tabuan Muda (Young Wasps)
- Association: FABD
- Confederation: AFC
- Sub-confederation: AFF
- Head coach: Aminuddin Jumat
- Home stadium: Hassanal Bolkiah National Stadium
First colours	Second colours

FIFA U-20 World Cup
- Appearances: 0

AFC U-20 Asian Cup
- Appearances: 4 (first in 1970)
- Best result: Group Stage (4 Times)

ASEAN U-19 Boys Championship
- Appearances: 11 (first in 2002)
- Best result: Group Stage (11 Times)

The Brunei national under-19 football team is the under-19 football team of Brunei and is controlled by the Football Association of Brunei Darussalam. The team participates in the ASEAN Under-19 Boys Championship and the AFC U-20 Asian Cup.

== Results and fixtures ==
=== 2026 ===
2026 ASEAN U-19 Boys' Championship

2 June 2026 Group B	Thailand	9–0	Brunei	Medan, Indonesia
16:00 UTC+7	Itthimon 7'; Pattaratron 24', 26', 36'; Pichaya 40' (pen.); Siwakorn 49', 52'; Kongnat 69'; Natthakit 89'	Report		Stadium: Teladan Stadium; Referee: Jon Mick Pineda (Philippines)

5 June 2026 Group B	Brunei	0–4	Malaysia	Medan, Indonesia
16:00 UTC+7		Report	Khalish 22' (o.g.); Arsyad 45+3'; Irfan A. 90+3'; Ierfan H. 90+6'	Stadium: Teladan Stadium; Referee: Iv Tina (Cambodia)

8 June 2026 Group B	Singapore	4–0	Brunei	Medan, Indonesia
20:00 UTC+7	Peh 42'; Eziakor 44'; Andy Reedqy 50'; Liska 64'	Report		Stadium: Teladan Stadium; Referee: Iv Tina (Cambodia)

2027 AFC U-20 Asian Cup qualification

31 August 2026 Group K	Maldives	2–0	Brunei	Yangon, Myanmar
19:00 UTC+6:30	Zaki 19'; Ilan 31'	Report		Stadium: Thuwunna Stadium; Referee: Muath Owfi (Palestine)

3 September 2026 Group K	Brunei	0–7	Myanmar	Yangon, Myanmar
16:00 UTC+6:30		Report	Aung Thi Ha 24'; Thura Min Thant 37'; Azri 72' (o.g.); Thaw Zin Ko 74' (pen.), 83'; Sai Bo Bo Kyaw 81'; Kyaw Nyi Nyi 82'	Stadium: Thuwunna Stadium; Referee: Ahmad Yacoub Ibrahim (Jordan)

6 September 2026 Group K	Brunei	0–2	Sri Lanka	Yangon, Myanmar
19:00 UTC+6:30		Report	Katheem 46'; Maleek 67'	Stadium: Thuwunna Stadium; Referee: Khash-Erdene Bold (Mongolia)

== Current squad ==
- The following players were called up for the 2027 AFC U-20 Asian Cup qualification held in Myanmar in September 2026.
- Match dates: 31 August–6 September 2026
- Caps and goals correct as of: 7 September 2026
- Names in italics denote players who have been capped for the senior team.

No.	Pos.	Player	Date of birth (age)	Caps	Goals	Club
1	GK	Akmal Hakeem Shamsuddin		1	0	(Football Association of Brunei Darussalam) Wijaya
18	GK	Safwan Aflie Shahrin		4	0	(Football Association of Brunei Darussalam) Kasuka
20	GK	Muhsin Yusuf Idham Maswandi		0	0	(Football Association of Brunei Darussalam) BFA Brunei
2	DF	Adrian Marvel Erni		5	0	(Football Association of Brunei Darussalam) Kasuka
3	DF	Mahmud Khalish Zaifulizham		5	0	(Football Association of Brunei Darussalam) Wijaya
5	DF	Azri Danial Yusra		5	0	(Football Association of Brunei Darussalam) DPMM II
13	DF	Darwishafis Hamzillah		6	0	(Football Association of Brunei Darussalam) Wijaya
14	DF	Syahmi Wa'ie Khirol Effendi		4	0	(Football Association of Brunei Darussalam) Kasuka
15	DF	Amirul Umar Saiful Rizal		3	0	(Football Association of Brunei Darussalam) DPMM II
17	DF	Khalish Wa'ie Azman	11 April 2009 (age 17)	6	0	(Football Association of Brunei Darussalam) Indera
19	DF	Safwan Ikhwan Safiuddin Jasri	1 January 2008 (age 18)	0	0	(Football Association of Brunei Darussalam) Panchor Murai
23	DF	Danish Aiman Sahrizul	23 January 2007 (age 19)	3	0	(Football Association of Brunei Darussalam) Indera
4	MF	Abdul Rash Aiman Nazmie Abdul Rashid		0	0	(Football Association of Brunei Darussalam) Rimba Star
6	MF	Hadiman Sulaiman (captain)		4	0	(Football Association of Brunei Darussalam) Kasuka
11	MF	Faris Fadillah Saiful Bahari	1 January 2008 (age 18)	5	0	(Football Association of Brunei Darussalam) DPMM II
16	MF	Faaiz Zulkeflee		4	0	(Football Association of Brunei Darussalam) Kasuka
21	MF	Danish Saqhwi Razali		3	0	(Football Association of Brunei Darussalam) Gergasi
7	FW	Shaqeel Qays Wafri Suhardi		5	0	(Football Association of Brunei Darussalam) Kasuka
8	FW	Harith Aqil Azaman		4	0	(Football Association of Brunei Darussalam) DPMM
9	FW	Arshyad Taqiuddin Abdul Rahim		5	0	(Football Association of Brunei Darussalam) Kasuka
10	FW	Faris Ar-Rayyan Yahya	10 September 2008 (age 18)	5	0	(Football Association of Brunei Darussalam) BSRC
12	FW	Darwish Izzat Keairol		1	0	(Football Association of Brunei Darussalam) Kasuka
22	FW	Daryyl Rafael Edy Asmyra	16 July 2007 (age 19)	2	0	(Football Association of Brunei Darussalam) BSRC

=== Recent call-ups ===
The following players have also been called up to the Brunei under-17 squad in the last twelve months.

Pos.	Player	Date of birth (age)	Caps	Goals	Club	Latest call-up
GK	Adrian Daniel Suhaimi		1	0	(Brunei) Kasuka	2026 ASEAN U-19 Boys' Championship
DF	Hazwan Izuddin Noorizam		1	0	(Brunei) Kasuka	2026 ASEAN U-19 Boys' Championship
MF	Al-Amin Khairol Norlizam		1	0	(Brunei) Kasuka	2026 ASEAN U-19 Boys' Championship
FW	Ilyas Ilyasa Yahya		1	0	(Brunei) BSRC	2026 ASEAN U-19 Boys' Championship

== See also ==
- Brunei national football team
- Brunei national under-23 football team
- Brunei national under-21 football team
- Brunei national under-17 football team
