= Isfandyar Abdillah =

Indonesian footballer (born 2007)

Personal information
- Full name: Muhammad Isfandyar Abdillah
- Date of birth: 23 June 2007 (age 19)
- Place of birth: Bogor, Indonesia
- Height: 1.78 m (5 ft 10 in)
- Position: Central midfielder

Team information
- Current team: PSS Sleman
- Number: 30

Youth career
- 2024–2025: Persikabo 1973 U20

Senior career*
Years	Team	Apps	(Gls)
2024–2025	Persikabo 1973	17	(1)
2025–2026	Persiba Balikpapan	27	(2)
2026–	PSS Sleman	1	(0)

International career^{‡}
2026–	Indonesia U20	7	(0)
- * Club domestic league appearances and goals as of 20 September 2026 ‡ National team caps and goals as of 6 September 2026

Muhammad Isfandyar Abdillah (born 23 June 2007), commonly known as Dyar, is an Indonesian professional footballer who plays as a central midfielder for Super League club PSS Sleman and the Indonesia national under-20 football team.

== Early life ==
Abdillah was born on 23 June 2007 in Bogor Regency, West Java. He grew up in the village of Cicadas, located within the district of Gunung Putri of Bogor Regency, where he began his early football journey.

== Club career ==
=== Early career ===
Abdillah developed his football skills in his hometown at the Persikabo 1973 youth academy.

=== Persikabo 1973 ===
Abdillah was promoted to the Persikabo 1973 first team ahead of the start of the 2024–25 season. He made his professional debut on 15 September 2024, playing as a substitute in a 2–4 home loss to Persiraja Banda Aceh at the Pakansari Stadium. A week later, Abdillah made his first start in a 5–2 win over Dejan. On 30 January 2025, he scored his first professional goal in a 4–3 away loss to Dejan.

=== Persiba Balikpapan ===
In August 2025, Abdillah signed with Championship club Persiba Balikpapan. During the 2025–26 season, he emerged as a crucial young player under coach Mohammad Nasuha, recording the highest minutes played among the squad's under-21 players. He made 17 appearances and scored one goal for Persiba.

=== PSS Sleman ===
On 3 August 2026, Abdillah moved to top-flight side PSS Sleman on a free transfer ahead of the 2026–27 Super League campaign. He made his top-tier league debut on 20 September 2026, coming on as a late substitute in a 1–2 away defeat to Dewa United.

== International career ==
In May 2026, Abdillah was included on Indonesia U-19 23-man list for 2026 ASEAN U-19 Boys' Championship. He made his international debut with U19 national team on the first matchday of the tournament against Myanmar on 1 June 2026.

In August 2026, he was called up by coach Nova Arianto to join the Indonesia national under-20 football team for the 2027 AFC U-20 Asian Cup qualification matches.

== Career statistics ==
=== Club ===
As of 20 September 2026.

Club	Season	League			Cup		Continental		Other		Total	
Club	Season	Division	Apps	Goals	Apps	Goals	Apps	Goals	Apps	Goals	Apps	Goals
Persikabo 1973	2024–25	Liga 2	17	1	0	0	–		0	0	17	1
Persiba Balikpapan	2025–26	Championship	27	2	0	0	–		0	0	27	2
PSS Sleman	2026–27	Super League	1	0	0	0	–		0	0	1	0
Career total			45	3	0	0	0	0	0	0	45	3
