= North Sumatra Stadium =

Association football stadium in North Sumatra, Indonesia

- Stadion Utama Sumatera Utara
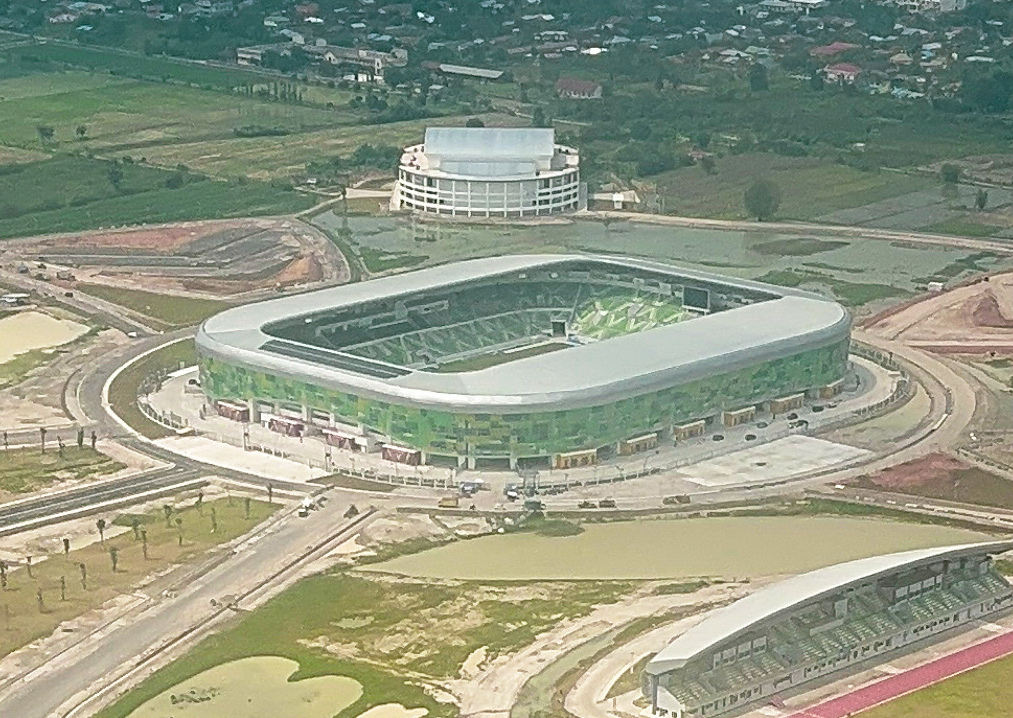
- Interactive map of North Sumatra Stadium
- Location: Deli Serdang Regency, North Sumatra, Indonesia
- Coordinates: 3°36′10.46″N 98°49′20.325″E
- Owner: North Sumatra Government
- Capacity: 25,750
- Surface: Hybrid grass

Construction
- Groundbreaking: 14 August 2020
- Built: September 2023 – September 2024
- Opened: 15 October 2024
- Cost: Rp. 587 Billion (September 2023)
- Project managers: LLC JCM and LLC Ciriajasa
- Main contractor: Adhi Karya

Tenants
- 2024 National Sports Week; PSMS Medan

North Sumatra Stadium (Indonesian: Stadion Utama Sumatera Utara), is an association football stadium in the center of the North Sumatra Sports Center in Deli Serdang Regency, North Sumatra, Indonesia, located about 8.2 km (5.1 miles) southwest of Kualanamu International Airport. It has a capacity of 25,750 people. The stadium was built for the 2024 National Sports Week, where it hosted the closing ceremony. President Joko Widodo opened the stadium officially on 15 October 2024.

== Facilities ==
North Sumatra Stadium is designed specifically for football, without the athletics track commonly found in Indonesian stadiums. This results in a closer proximity between the pitch and the stands. The stadium is built on a 48,420 square meter land area with a building area of 27,452 square meters. It has a capacity of 25,750 spectators with individual seats. There are 365 seats in the VIP and VVIP stands, and 46 seats specifically designed for people with disabilities. North Sumatra Stadium is also equipped with solar panels to generate its own electricity.

== Transport ==
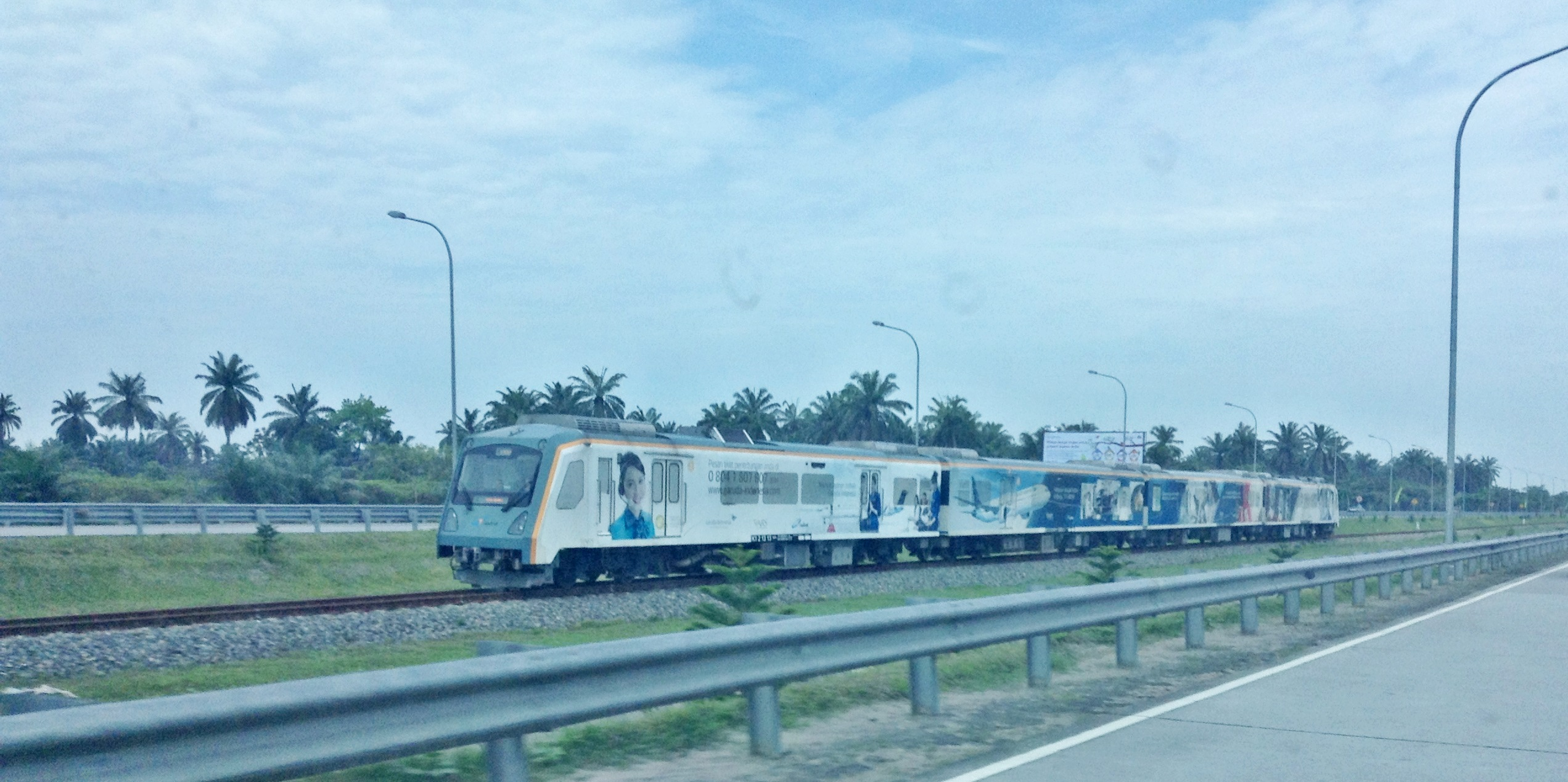
One of the two Kualanamu ARS (Airport Railink Service) trains

The stadium is equipped with direct rail access from Kualanamu International Airport via the airport rail link. There is also electric bus service at Mebidang that provides direct transportation from both the airport and from the direction of Medan. Meanwhile, those using private vehicles can take the Trans Sumatra Toll Road, which can be accessed from various cities.

== Sporting events ==
=== 2024 Pekan Olahraga Nasional ===
In 2024, North Sumatra Stadium served as the venue for the closing ceremony of the 21st National Sports Week (PON XXI), which was co-hosted by the provinces of Aceh and North Sumatra. Although the football tournament took place in different venues, the stadium was chosen as the official site to conclude the country's largest multi-sport event, highlighting its modern facilities and regional significance.

=== Association football ===
In June 2025, PSMS Medan, one of Indonesia’s most historic football clubs, announced that they would temporarily use North Sumatra Stadium as their home ground for the Indonesian Championship competition. This decision was made while their traditional home, Teladan Stadium, underwent major renovations. The record for the highest attendance was broken during the Piala Indonesia match between PSMS Medan and Persija, with 22,158 spectators in attendance.

==== International friendly matches ====
In August 2025, the stadium hosts an international friendly tournament called the Independence Cup (Piala Kemerdekaan), featuring the Indonesia U-17 national team, as part of their preparation for the 2025 FIFA U-17 World Cup in Qatar. These matches marked the first international football fixtures held at the venue, showcasing its readiness to support youth-level international competitions. Indonesia is competing against Tajikistan, Uzbekistan, and Mali.

==== ASEAN U19 Championship ====
The 2026 ASEAN U-19 Boys' Championship will be held at North Sumatra Stadium, Deli Serdang, North Sumatra, from 1–14 June 2026.

==== 2031 AFC Asian Cup bid ====
North Sumatra Stadium is proposed as one of four main stadiums by the Football Association of Indonesia (PSSI) in the country's official bid to host the 2031 AFC Asian Cup. Alongside other major venues across Indonesia, the stadium was highlighted for its compliance with FIFA and AFC infrastructure standards, including seating capacity, accessibility, and energy-efficient features.

== International football matches ==
=== 2025 Indonesian Independence Cup ===
Date	Time (UTC+07)	Team 1	Score	Team 2	Attendance
12 August 2025	15:30	Mali	5–1	Uzbekistan	1,123
12 August 2025	19:30	Indonesia	2–2	Tajikistan	12,517
15 August 2025	15:30	Tajikistan	2–4	Mali	1,067
15 August 2025	19:30	Uzbekistan	0–2	Indonesia	21,537
18 August 2025	16:00	Uzbekistan	3–3	Tajikistan	3,115
18 August 2025	20:30	Indonesia	1–2	Mali	21,991

=== 2026 ASEAN U-19 Boys' Championship ===
Date	Time (UTC+07)	Team 1	Score	Team 2	Attendance
1 June 2026	16:00	Vietnam	3–0	Timor-Leste	
1 June 2026	20:00	Indonesia	3–0	Myanmar	16,398
4 June 2026	16:00	Myanmar	0–5	Vietnam	
4 June 2026	20:00	Timor-Leste	0–3	Indonesia	6,623
7 June 2026	16:00	Indonesia	2–1	Vietnam	22,724
7 June 2026	20:00	Myanmar	3–1	Timor-Leste	
11 June 2026	16:00	Thailand	4–0	Cambodia	
11 June 2026	20:00	Indonesia	0–1	Australia	22,268
13 June 2026	16:00	Cambodia	0–1	Indonesia	12,463
13 June 2026	20:15	Thailand	0–2	Australia	9,854

== Entertainment events ==
Date	Artists	Events	Attendance	Revenue	Ref
2024
20 September	Nidji feat Denada	Closing Ceremony 2024 National Sports Week	11.377	—	
2025
18 August	NTRL	Independence Cup	21,991	—	
