= Singapore national under-20 football team =

National association football team

Singapore U-19
- Nickname: The Cubs
- Association: Football Association of Singapore
- Head coach: Syed Azmir
- Captain: Gareth Low
- Home stadium: Jalan Besar Stadium (Temporary, till April 2014); New Singapore National Stadium (April 2014 onwards)
- FIFA code: SIN
First colours	Second colours

AFC U-20 Asian Cup
- Appearances: 18 (first in 1959)
- Best result: Fourth place (1967)

Youth Olympics
- Appearances: 6
Medal record
Singapore national under-20 football team
Medal record
U-19 Southeast Asian Championship
Bronze medal – third place	2010 Singapore	Team

The Singapore national under-19 football team is the national Under 19 association football team of Singapore. The team comes under the organization of the Football Association of Singapore (FAS).

Players were selected from the nation's National Football Academy Under-17 & 18 and S.League's Prime League squad.

== Results ==
=== AFC U-19 Championship/AFC U-20 Asian Cup ===
Year	Result	M	W	D	L	GF	GA
(Malaysia) 1959	Round 1	5	1	1	3	15	18
(Malaysia) 1960	Group stage	3	0	0	3	6	16
(Thailand) 1961	Group stage	4	1	1	2	2	10
(Thailand) 1962	Group stage	4	0	0	4	1	16
(Malaysia) 1963	Group stage	5	2	0	3	10	14
(South Vietnam) 1964	Did not enter						
(Japan) 1965	Did not enter						
(Philippines) 1966	Group stage	4	1	1	2	5	13
(Thailand) 1967	Fourth place	6	3	0	3	6	10
(South Korea) 1968	Round 1	3	1	0	2	4	9
(Thailand) 1969	Group stage	2	0	0	2	2	11
(Philippines) 1970	Group stage	3	0	0	3	2	13
(Japan) 1971	Group stage	3	0	0	3	1	6
(Thailand) 1972	Quarterfinals	5	3	0	2	10	6
(Iran) 1973	Quarterfinals	3	1	0	2	2	4
(Thailand) 1974	Quarterfinals	4	2	1	1	6	2
(Kuwait) 1975	Group stage	4	1	0	3	1	11
(Thailand) 1976	Group stage	3	0	1	2	3	8
(Iran) 1977	Group stage	2	0	1	1	0	8
(Bangladesh) 1978	Group stage	4	0	1	3	3	15
1980 to 2027	Did not qualify						
Total	18/42	67	16	7	44	79	190

== History ==
The under-19 football team was formed to represent Singapore in the AFF U-19 Youth Championship since 2001. The squad finished 3rd and won Bronze in the 2010 Singapore Youth Olympic Games.

=== 2013 ===
The team is currently coached by Dejan Glusevic, the best youth coach in Singapore with his emphasis on passing and movement.

The Football Association of Singapore entered the team as the 'Singapore Cubs' in the 2014 Prime League in view of the 2015 Southeast Asian Games which Singapore is hosting. They are the third youth age group team to participate in the Prime League, after the NFA U-17 and U-18 teams.

== Honours ==
=== Regional ===
- 2010 Youth Olympic Games
  - Bronze medal (1): 2010

== Recent results ==
Win Draw Lose

=== 2026 ===
13 February 2026 Closed-doors friendly	Singapore	0–2	Jordan	Kallang, Singapore
19:30 UTC+8		Report	Abdulrahman Al-Zaghaiba 54', 68'	Stadium: Kallang Football Hub; Referee: Jansen Foo (Singapore)

16 February 2026 Closed-doors friendly	Singapore	1–2	Jordan	Kallang, Singapore
19:30 UTC+8	Helmi Shahrol 21'	Report	Omar Al-Khatib 42'; Mohammad Hamdomeh 72'	Stadium: Kallang Football Hub

8 March 2026 Closed-doors friendly	Singapore	3–4	Maldives	Choa Chu Kang, Singapore
19:30 UTC+8	Prince Rio 17'; Harith Danish 20'; Levi Farris		Ilan Imran 12'; Ethan Ibrahim 21'; Ahzam Rasheed 52'; Alhaan Faisal 68'	Stadium: Choa Chu Kang Stadium

11 March 2026 Closed-doors friendly	Singapore	6–2	Maldives	Bishan, Singapore
19:30 UTC+8	Harith Danish 52'; Helmi Shahrol; Adam Irfan; Sky Yeo	Report	Nassah Ibrahim 42'; Anoof Abdulla 90+4'	Stadium: Bishan Stadium

21 May 2026 Closed-doors friendly	Singapore	0–4	United Arab Emirates	Jalan Besar, Singapore
19:30 UTC+8				Stadium: Jalan Besar Stadium

24 May 2026 Closed-doors friendly	Singapore	0–4	United Arab Emirates	Jalan Besar, Singapore
19:30 UTC+8				Stadium: Jalan Besar Stadium

2 June 2026 2026 ASEAN U-19 Boys Championship	Malaysia	3–0	Singapore	North Sumatra, Indonesia
20:00 UTC+7	Arif Aiman 21'; Abid Safaraz 39'; Tengku Hasyri 61'	Report		Stadium: Teladan Stadium; Referee: Lê Vũ Linh (Vietnam)

5 June 2026 2026 ASEAN U-19 Boys Championship	Singapore	0–4	Thailand	North Sumatra, Indonesia
20:00 UTC+7		Report	Pirada 27'; Natthakit 40'; Sirisaran 72'; Ratchanon 90+2'	Stadium: Teladan Stadium; Referee: Naufal Adya Fairuski (Indonesia)

8 June 2026 2026 ASEAN U-19 Boys Championship	Singapore	4–0	Brunei	North Sumatra, Indonesia
20:00 UTC+7	Rae Peh 42'; Eziakor 44'; Andy 50'; Liska 64'	Report		Stadium: Teladan Stadium; Referee: Iv Tina (Cambodia)

3 August 2026 Friendly	India	3–0	Singapore	Bengaluru, India
	Rishi Singh 45+3'; Shami Singamayum 63'; (o.g.)	Report		Stadium: Centre For Sports Excellence; Attendance: 0
Note: The match is held behind closed doors.

6 August 2026 Friendly	India	1–0	Singapore	Bengaluru, India
	Sumit Sharma Brahmacharimayum 5'	Report		Stadium: Centre For Sports Excellence; Attendance: 0
Note: The match is held behind closed doors.

31 August 2026 2027 U-20 Asian Cup Q	Singapore	3–1	Bhutan	Thimphu, Bhutan
20:00 UTC+8	Jaden Heng 11'; Jadon Quah 34'; Lukyan Tan 81'	Report	Kelden Dorji 55'	Stadium: Changlimithang Stadium; Attendance: 1,224; Referee: Baraa Aisha (Palestine)
Note: Singapore 24-man squad

3 September 2026 2027 U-20 Asian Cup Q	Macau	0–1	Singapore	Thimphu, Bhutan
17:00 UTC+8		Report	Sarrvin Raj 28'	Stadium: Changlimithang Stadium; Referee: Yahya Al-Balushi (Oman); Player of the Match: Sarrvin Raj
Note: Singapore 24-man squad

6 September 2026 2027 U-20 Asian Cup Q	Chinese Taipei	2–0	Singapore	Thimphu, Bhutan
17:00 UTC+8	Sung Chi-Chan 63', 82'	Report		Stadium: Changlimithang Stadium; Referee: Mohamed Saad (Bahrain)
Note: Singapore 24-man squad

== Coaching staff ==
Position	Name
Team manager	(Singapore) Kevin Huang
Head coach	(Singapore) Syed Azmir
Assistant Coach(es)	(Singapore) Miur Rafik Taha
Goalkeeper Coach	(Singapore) Daniel Ong
Individual Coach	(Singapore) Amirul Singh
Fitness Coach	(Singapore) Hafiz Osman
Match Analyst	(Japan) Satoru Okada
Head Football Science and Medicine	(Malaysia) Firdaus Massar
Senior Sports Trainer	(Singapore) Nasruldin Baharuddin
Sports Trainer	(Singapore) Fazly Hasan (Singapore) Ryan Wang
Masseur	(Singapore) Gurnaya Singh
Sports Scientist	(Singapore) Faizal Khalid Abdul Aziz
Physiotherapist	(Singapore) Imran Khamis
Kit Manager	(Singapore) Omar Mohd
Media Officer	(Singapore) Chia Pui San
Equipment Officer	(Singapore) Vincent Teo

== Players ==
=== Current squad ===
The following 24 players were called up for the AFC U20 Asian Cup China 2027 Qualifiers.

No.	Pos.	Player	Date of birth (age)	Caps	Goals	Club
1	GK	Aniq Matin	11 May 2007 (age 19)	0	0	(Football Association of Singapore) Geylang International
13	GK	Ilhan Hady Rezal	19 March 2010 (age 16)	2	0	(Singapore) Young Lions
22	GK	Kenneth Ng	6 February 2009 (age 17)	0	0	(Singapore) Young Lions
2	DF	Zharfan Zainal Abiddin	10 February 2009 (age 17)	2	0	(Australia) North Eastern MetroStars
3	DF	Luth Harith	19 March 2008 (age 18)	1	0	(Football Association of Singapore) Young Lions
5	DF	Shafrel Ariel	6 April 2008 (age 18)	2	0	(Football Association of Singapore) Geylang International
7	DF	Ikmal Hazlan	11 January 2007 (age 19)	1	0	(Football Association of Singapore) Balestier Khalsa
12	DF	Ryan Vishal	25 January 2007 (age 19)	1	0	(Football Association of Singapore) Young Lions
15	DF	Levi Faris Alfa	31 May 2007 (age 19)	0	0	(Football Association of Singapore) Balestier Khalsa
16	DF	Zaki Jumlan	27 September 2009 (age 17)	0	0	(Singapore) National Development Centre
19	DF	Nur Muhammad Fadly	30 May 2007 (age 19)	2	0	(Football Association of Singapore) Young Lions
20	DF	Sim Jun Yen	28 September 2007 (age 19)	1	0	(Football Association of Singapore) Albirex Niigata (S)
21	DF	Zeeshan Iskandar	3 April 2007 (age 19)	1	0	(Football Association of Singapore) BG Tampines Rovers
4	MF	Danial Herwan	19 September 2008 (age 18)	2	0	(Football Association of Singapore) Young Lions
6	MF	Andy Reefqy	14 July 2008 (age 18)	2	0	(Football Association of Singapore) Young Lions
8	MF	Jaden Heng	10 November 2008 (age 18)	2	1	(Football Association of Singapore) Albirex Niigata (S)
10	MF	Prince Rio Rifae'i	27 January 2008 (age 18)	1	0	(Football Association of Singapore) Geylang International
14	MF	Elijah Srinivasa	9 June 2009 (age 17)	1	0	(Singapore) Young Lions
23	MF	Qylfie Ryan Bin Fazlie	15 April 2007 (age 19)	0	0	(Football Association of Singapore) BG Tampines Rovers
	MF	Rasul Ramli	26 March 2007 (age 19)	0	0	(Football Association of Singapore) Tampines Rovers
9	FW	Lukyan Tan	28 November 2010 (age 15)	2	1	(Football Association of Singapore) Young Lions
11	FW	Sarrvin Raj	5 April 2008 (age 18)	2	0	(Football Association of Singapore) Young Lions
17	FW	Jadon Quah	20 April 2008 (age 18)	1	1	(Singapore) Lion City Sailors
18	FW	Uchenna Eziakor	17 May 2008 (age 18)	4	0	(Singapore) Young Lions

=== Recent call-ups ===
These players are called up for the last 12 months.

Pos.	Player	Date of birth (age)	Caps	Goals	Club	Latest call-up
GK	Jarec Ng	25 January 2008 (age 18)	0	0	(Singapore) BG Tampines Rovers	2026 ASEAN U-19 Boys Championship
GK	Issac Goh Jun Yang	5 June 2007 (age 19)	0	0	(Singapore) Young Lions	2026 ASEAN U-19 Boys Championship
DF	Ilhan Farid		0	0	(Singapore)	2026 ASEAN U-19 Boys Championship
DF	Adly Nufail		0	0	(Singapore) BG Tampines Rovers	v. United Arab Emirates, 21 May 2026
DF	SC Denilson		0	0	(Singapore) Geylang International	v. Maldives, 11 March 2026
DF	Sky Yeo Sze Kai		0	0	(Singapore) BG Tampines Rovers	v. Maldives, 11 March 2026
DF	Aaryan Fikri	5 September 2007 (age 19)	0	0	(Singapore) Lion City Sailors	v. Maldives, 11 March 2026
DF	Sachin Kabilan Chandra	24 January 2007 (age 19)	0	0	(Singapore) Albirex Niigata (S)	v. Maldives, 11 March 2026
DF	Aneeq Fairus	9 June 2007 (age 19)	0	0	(Singapore) Albirex Niigata (S)	v. Maldives, 11 March 2026
MF	Rae Peh Jun Wen	15 September 2008 (age 18)	0	0	(Singapore) BG Tampines Rovers	2026 ASEAN U-19 Boys Championship
MF	Loo Kai Sheng	9 January 2007 (age 19)	0	0	(Singapore) Young Lions	2026 ASEAN U-19 Boys Championship
MF	Erdy Thaqib	18 November 2009 (age 16)	0	0	Singapore Sports School	v. United Arab Emirates, 21 May 2026
MF	Christopher Lee Yee Wen		0	0	(Singapore) Young Lions	v. Maldives, 11 March 2026
MF	Rauf Anaqi	6 March 2008 (age 18)	0	0	(Singapore) Young Lions	v. Maldives, 11 March 2026
MF	Harith Danish	27 November 2008 (age 17)	0	0	(Singapore) Young Lions	v. Maldives, 11 March 2026
FW	Varghese Ethan		0	0	(Singapore) Lion City Sailors U17	v. India,6 August 2026
FW	Liska Haaziq Iskandar	30 April 2007 (age 19)	0	0	(Singapore) Albirex Niigata (S)	2026 ASEAN U-19 Boys Championship
FW	Vedant Raj	12 September 2009 (age 17)	0	0	(Singapore) Geylang International	2026 ASEAN U-19 Boys Championship
FW	Adam Irfan		0	0	(Singapore) Young Lions	v. United Arab Emirates, 21 May 2026
FW	Tyler Matthew Ho		0	0	(Singapore) Young Lions	v. Maldives, 11 March 2026
FW	Nathan Mao Zhi Xuan	26 March 2008 (age 18)	2	0	(Singapore) Young Lions	v. Maldives, 11 March 2026
FW	Helmi Shahrol	31 July 2008 (age 18)	0	0	(Singapore) Albirex Niigata (S)	v. Maldives, 11 March 2026

Notes:

- ^{COV} Player out due to COVID / COVID warning
- ^{INJ} Player withdrew from the squad due to an injury
- ^{PRE} Preliminary squad
- ^{STA} Player on standby
- ^{SUS} Player suspended
- ^{RET} Retired from the national team
- ^{WD} Player withdrew from the s

== See also ==
- Singapore national football team
- Singapore national youth football team
- Young Lions
- Singapore women's national football team
