= Medin Memeti =

Australian soccer player

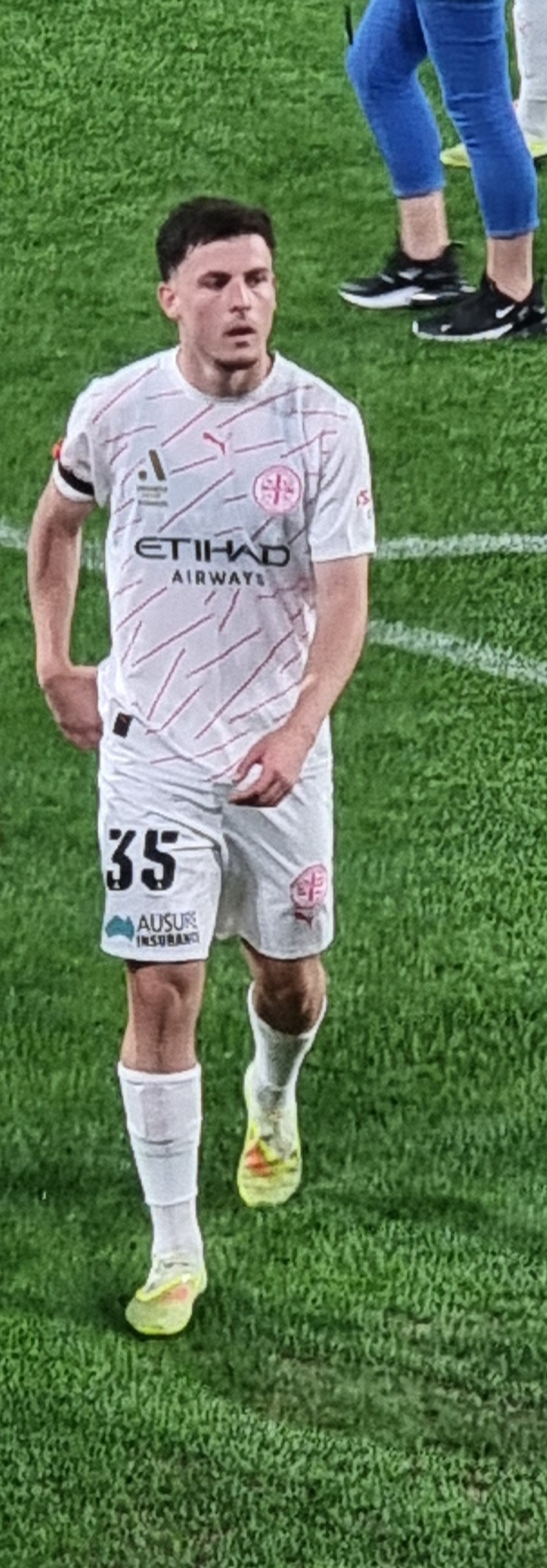
- Memeti playing for Melbourne City in 2026.

Personal information
- Full name: Medin Memeti
- Date of birth: 20 June 2007 (age 19)
- Place of birth: Australia
- Height: 1.84 m (6 ft 0 in)
- Position: Striker

Team information
- Current team: Melbourne City
- Number: 23

Youth career
- Dandenong Thunder
- Melbourne City Youth

Senior career*
Years	Team	Apps	(Gls)
2024–	Melbourne City	42	(10)

International career^{‡}
2025–	Australia U20	2	(1)
- * Club domestic league appearances and goals as of 2 May 2026 ‡ National team caps and goals as of 8 May 2025

Medin Memeti (Albanian: [ˈmɛdin mɛˈmɛti]; born 20 June 2007) is an Albanian Australian professional soccer player who plays as a striker for Melbourne City in the A-League Men.

== Club career ==
Memeti progressed through the Melbourne City Academy and signed a three-year professional contract with the club ahead of the 2024–25 season, with an option for a further year. He made his professional debut at 17 coming on as a substitute on 4 November 2024 against Western United. In the next match, he scored and assisted in a 5–0 win over Perth Glory on 10 November.

Memeti than scored on his 2025–26 AFC Champions League Elite debut against Malaysian club Johor Darul Ta'zim on 25 November 2025 in a 2–0 win.

== International career ==
Memeti was part of the Australia under-20's successful campaign at the 2025 AFC U-20 Asian Cup, where Australia clinched their first major youth title since joining the AFC, overcoming three-time winners Saudi Arabia on penalties. Memeti scored a goal in their group stage match against China.

== Personal life ==
Memeti's parents are ethnic Albanians from Bitola.

== Career statistics ==
As of 8 May 2025

Season	Club	League	Apps	Goals
2024–25	Melbourne City	A-League Men	18	5
Total			18	5

Ref:

== Honours ==
=== Australia U-19 ===
- 2026 ASEAN U-19 Boys Championship

=== Individual ===
- 2026 ASEAN U-19 Boys Championship top scorer
