= Reno Salampessy =

Indonesian footballer

Personal information
- Date of birth: 22 June 2007 (age 19)
- Place of birth: Jakarta, Indonesia
- Height: 1.80 m (5 ft 11 in)
- Position: Forward

Team information
- Current team: Persipura Jayapura
- Number: 7

Youth career
- 2018–2022: SSB Batik Jayapura
- 2023: SSB Heijnes Kotaraja
- 2023–2024: Persemi Mimika
- 2024: PON Papua

Senior career*
Years	Team	Apps	(Gls)
2025–	Persipura Jayapura	37	(9)

International career^{‡}
2023	Indonesia U17	1	(0)
2026–	Indonesia U20	8	(2)
- * Club domestic league appearances and goals as of 26 September 2026 ‡ National team caps and goals as of 6 September 2026

Reno Salampessy (born 22 June 2007) is an Indonesian professional footballer who plays as a forward for Championship club Persipura Jayapura and the Indonesia U20 national team.

== Club career ==
=== Persipura Jayapura ===
Reno began his football career with SSB Batik Jayapura before joining Liga 2 club Persipura Jayapura on 1 January 2025, to prepare for the 2024–25 season.

He made his first-team debut for Persipura on 4 January 2025 in a league match against Persewar Waropen at Mandala Stadium, coming on as a substitute for Anis Nabar in the 61st minute. A week later, he scored his first league goal for Persipura Jayapura in a 0–3 away win against Persipal Palu; this first goal made him the youngest goal scorer on the Persipura's team at 17 years old.

== International career ==
On 30 August 2023, Salampessy made his first cap for the Indonesia U-17 for a friendly match against South Korea U-17 a 0–1 loss.

In May 2023, Salampessy was called up by Nova Arianto to the Indonesia U-20 for the training centre in preparation for 2026 ASEAN U-19 Boys' Championship. On 1 June 2026, he made his debut for the team against Myanmar U-20 in a 3–0 win. Three days later, he scored his first goal for youth national team against Timor-Leste U-20, opening the scoring in a 0–3 win at North Sumatra Stadium.

== Career statistics ==
=== Club ===
As of 26 September 2026.

Club	Season	League			Cup		Continental		Other		Total	
Club	Season	Division	Apps	Goals	Apps	Goals	Apps	Goals	Apps	Goals	Apps	Goals
Persipura Jayapura	2024–25	Liga 2	10	4	0	0	–		0	0	10	4
Persipura Jayapura	2025–26	Championship	24	5	0	0	–		0	0	24	5
Persipura Jayapura	2026–27	Championship	3	0	0	0	–		0	0	3	0
Career total			37	9	0	0	0	0	0	0	37	9

== Personal life ==
Reno was born in Jakarta. He is the son of former Indonesia international footballer Ricardo Salampessy, who played as a defender. Ricardo spent much of his professional career with Persipura Jayapura, and also represented several other Indonesian clubs, including Persiwa Wamena.

== Honours ==
Indonesia U19

- ASEAN U-19 Boys Championship third-place: 2026
