= 2026 ASEAN U-19 Boys' Championship =

International football competition

Kejuaraan Remaja U-19 ASEAN 2026

Tournament details
- Host country: Indonesia
- Dates: 1–13 June 2026
- Teams: 11 (from 1 sub-confederation)
- Venues: 3 (in 2 host cities)

Final positions
- Champions: Australia (6th title)
- Runners-up: Thailand
- Third place: Indonesia
- Fourth place: Cambodia

Tournament statistics
- Matches played: 19
- Goals scored: 75 (3.95 per match)
- Top scorer(s): (Australia) Medin Memeti (5 goals)
- Best player: (Australia) Alexander Garbowski
- Best goalkeeper: (Indonesia) Dafa Setiawarman

The 2026 ASEAN U-19 Boys' Championship (officially the ASEAN U-19 Boys' Bank Sumut Championship 2026 for sponsorship reasons) is the 20th edition of the ASEAN U-19 Boys' Championship, the annual international youth football championship organised by ASEAN Football Federation (AFF) for the men's under-19 national teams of Southeast Asia. A total of 11 teams will play in the tournament, with players born on or after 1 January 2007 eligible to participate.

Indonesia are the defending champions, but then lost to Australia in the semi-finals, and subsequently finished third in the third-place play-off with Cambodia.

== Venues ==
The tournament will be held in three stadiums.

Deli Serdang		Medan
North Sumatra Stadium	Madya North Sumatra Stadium	Teladan Stadium
Capacity: 25,750	Capacity: 2,507	Capacity: 20,000
2026 ASEAN U-19 Boys' Championship is located in North Sumatra

== Participant teams ==
There was no qualification, and all entrants advanced to the final tournament. The following 11 teams from member associations of the ASEAN Football Federation entered the tournament. Laos withdrew from the tournament.

Team	Association	App	Previous best performance
Australia	Football Australia	10th	Winners (2006, 2008, 2010, 2016, 2019)
Brunei	FA Brunei DS	12th	Group stage (10 times)
Cambodia	FF Cambodia	14th	Group stage (12 times)
Indonesia	FA Indonesia	13th	Winners (2013, 2024)
Malaysia	FA Malaysia	16th	Winners (2018, 2022)
Myanmar	Myanmar FF	16th	Winners (2003, 2005)
Philippines	Philippine FF	12th	Group stage (10 times)
Singapore	FA Singapore	15th	Third place (2003)
Thailand	FA Thailand	19th	Winners (2002, 2009, 2011, 2015, 2017)
Timor-Leste	FF Timor-Leste	11th	Third place (2013)
Vietnam	Vietnam FF	19th	Winners (2007)

Did not enter
Laos

== Draw ==
The tournament's official draw was held on 7 May 2026 in Jakarta, Indonesia at 16:00 (GMT+07:00). The pot placements followed each teams progress based on the previous edition.

Pot 1	Pot 2	Pot 3	Pot 4
Indonesia (H); Thailand; Australia	Malaysia; Vietnam; Cambodia	Singapore; Timor-Leste; Philippines	Myanmar; Brunei

- (H): Tournament host

== Referee ==
Referees

- (Cambodia) Iv Tina
- (Indonesia) Naufal Adya Fairuski
- (Japan) Ryo Tanimoto
- (Kyrgyzstan) Alimardon Bainazarov
- (Malaysia) Zakaria Ismail
- (Philippines) Jon Mick Pineda
- (Singapore) Mohd Zulfiqar
- (Thailand) Alongkorn Khonwai
- (Vietnam) Lê Vũ Linh

== Group stage ==
The group winners and best runners-up advanced to the semi-finals.

Tie-breaking criteria for group play
The ranking of teams in the group stage is determined as follows:
1. Points obtained in all group matches;
2. Points in head-to-head matches among tied teams;
3. Goal difference in head-to-head matches among tied teams;
4. Goals scored in head-to-head matches among tied teams;
5. If more than two teams are tied, and after applying all head-to-head criteria above, a subset of teams are still tied, all head-to-head criteria above are reapplied exclusively to this subset of teams;
6. Goal difference in all group matches;
7. Goals scored in all group matches;
8. Penalty shoot-out if only two teams have the same number of points, and they met in the last round of the group and are tied after applying all criteria above (not used if more than two teams have the same number of points, or if their rankings are not relevant for qualification for the next stage);
9. Disciplinary points
  - Yellow card: −1 point;
  - Indirect red card (second yellow card): −3 points;
  - Direct red card: −3 points;
10. Drawing of lots.

=== Group A ===
Pos	Team	Pld	W	D	L	GF	GA	GD	Pts	Qualification
1	Indonesia (H)	3	3	0	0	8	1	+7	9	Knockout stage
2	Vietnam	3	2	0	1	9	2	+7	6	
3	Myanmar	3	1	0	2	3	9	−6	3	
4	Timor-Leste	3	0	0	3	1	9	−8	0	

Source: AFF
Rules for classification: Group stage tiebreakers
(H) Hosts
1 June 2026
16:00

Vietnam	3–0	Timor-Leste
Hoàng Công Hậu 2', 83', 90+1'	Report

North Sumatra Stadium, Deli Serdang
Referee: Alongkorn Khonwai (Thailand)
1 June 2026
20:00

Indonesia	3–0	Myanmar
Arkhan 38'; Dimas 78', 87'	Report

North Sumatra Stadium, Deli Serdang
Referee: Alimardon Bainazarov (Kyrgyzstan)

4 June 2026
16:00

Myanmar	0–5	Vietnam
	Report	Lê Tấn Dũng 28'; Hoàng Công Hậu 45+1'; Nguyễn Văn Bách 49'; Hoàng Trọng Duy Khang 53' (pen.); Nguyễn Thiên Phú 84'

North Sumatra Stadium, Deli Serdang
Referee: Zakaria Ismail (Malaysia)
4 June 2026
20:00

Timor-Leste	0–3	Indonesia
	Report	Reno 42'; Irpan 62'; Arkhan 64'

North Sumatra Stadium, Deli Serdang
Referee: Mohd Zulfiqar (Singapore)

7 June 2026
20:00

Indonesia	2–1	Vietnam
Reno 22'; Evandra 90+1' (pen.)	Report	Nguyễn Quốc Khánh 74'

North Sumatra Stadium, Deli Serdang
Referee: Ryo Tanimoto (Japan)
7 June 2026
20:00

Myanmar	3–1	Timor-Leste
La Min Pyae Sone 50'; Swan Zarni 58'; Sai Bo Bo Kyaw 90'	Report	Da Costa 41'

Teladan Stadium, Medan
Referee: Jon Mick Pineda (Philippines)

=== Group B ===
Pos	Team	Pld	W	D	L	GF	GA	GD	Pts	Qualification
1	Thailand	3	3	0	0	16	2	+14	9	Knockout stage
2	Malaysia	3	2	0	1	9	3	+6	6	
3	Singapore	3	1	0	2	4	7	−3	3	
4	Brunei	3	0	0	3	0	17	−17	0	

Source: AFF
Rules for classification: Group stage tiebreakers
2 June 2026
16:00

Thailand	9–0	Brunei
Itthimon 7'; Pattaratron 24', 26', 36'; Pichaya 40' (pen.); Siwakorn 49', 52'; Kongnat 69'; Natthakit 89'	Report

Teladan Stadium, Medan
Referee: Jon Mick Pineda (Philippines)
2 June 2026
20:00

Malaysia	3–0	Singapore
Arif 21'; Abid 39'; Hasyri 61'	Report

Teladan Stadium, Medan
Referee: Lê Vũ Linh (Vietnam)

5 June 2026
16:00

Brunei	0–4	Malaysia
	Report	Khalish 22' (o.g.); Arsyad 45+3'; Irfan A. 90+3'; Ierfan H. 90+6'

Teladan Stadium, Medan
Referee: Iv Tina (Cambodia)
5 June 2026
20:00

Singapore	0–4	Thailand
	Report	Pirada 27'; Natthakit 40'; Sirisaran 72'; Ratchanon 90+2'

Teladan Stadium, Medan
Referee: Naufal Adya Fairuski (Indonesia)

8 June 2026
20:00

Thailand	3–2	Malaysia
Pichaiya 21', 79' (pen.); Pirada 42'	Report	Amar 13'; Arsyad 45+3'

Madya North Sumatra Stadium, Deli Serdang
Referee: Alimardon Bainazarov (Kyrgyzstan)
8 June 2026
20:00

Singapore	4–0	Brunei
Rae Peh 42'; Eziakor 44'; Andy 50'; Liska 64'	Report

Teladan Stadium, Medan
Referee: Iv Tina (Cambodia)

=== Group C ===
Pos	Team	Pld	W	D	L	GF	GA	GD	Pts	Qualification
1	Australia	2	1	1	0	12	2	+10	4	Knockout stage
2	Cambodia	2	1	1	0	5	2	+3	4	Knockout stage
3	Philippines	2	0	0	2	0	13	−13	0	

Source: AFF
Rules for classification: Group stage tiebreakers
3 June 2026
20:00

Philippines	0–10	Australia
	Report	Memeti 7' (pen.), 26', 41', 65', 71'; Wong 58', 61'; Nunes 64' (pen.); Macallister 70', 82'

Madya North Sumatra Stadium, Deli Serdang
Referee: Ryo Tanimoto (Japan)

6 June 2026
20:00

Cambodia	3–0	Philippines
Seth 4', 14'; Sitha 39'	Report

Madya North Sumatra Stadium, Deli Serdang
Referee: Alongkorn Khonwai (Thailand)

9 June 2026
20:00

Australia	2–2	Cambodia
Neil 3'; Nunes 18'	Report	Sokea 59'; Marinucci 82' (o.g.)

Madya North Sumatra Stadium, Deli Serdang
Referee: Zakaria Ismail (Malaysia)

=== Ranking of second-placed teams ===
Pos	Grp	Team	Pld	W	D	L	GF	GA	GD	Pts	Qualification
1	C	Cambodia	2	1	1	0	5	2	+3	4	Knockout stage
2	A	Vietnam	2	1	0	1	6	2	+4	3	
3	B	Malaysia	2	1	0	1	5	3	+2	3	

Source: AFF
Rules for classification: 1) Points; 2) Goal difference; 3) Goals scored; 4) Disciplinary points; 5) Drawing of lots. Because Group C only has three teams, the results of the second-placed teams in Groups A and B against the bottom team in their groups will not be counted.

== Knockout stage ==
In the knockout stage, extra time and penalty shoot-out were used to decide the winners if necessary.

=== Bracket ===
Semi-finals
11 June
Thailand	4
Cambodia	0
11 June
Indonesia	0
Australia	1

Final
13 June
Thailand	0
Australia	2
Third place play-off
13 June
Cambodia	0
Indonesia	1

=== Semi-finals ===
11 June 2026
16:00

Thailand	4–0	Cambodia
Natthakit 32'; Itthimon 45+1', 80'; Sean 88' (o.g.)	Report

North Sumatra Stadium, Deli Serdang
Referee: Ryo Tanimoto (Japan)

11 June 2026
20:15

Indonesia	0–1	Australia
	Report	Neill 89'

North Sumatra Stadium, Deli Serdang
Referee: Alimardon Bainazarov (Kyrgyzstan)

=== Third place play-off ===
13 June 2026
16:00

Cambodia	0–1	Indonesia
	Report	Algazani 63'

North Sumatra Stadium, Deli Serdang
Referee: Mohd Zulfiqar (Singapore)

=== Final ===
13 June 2026
20:15

Thailand	0–2	Australia
	Report	Garbowski 41'; Baker 90+7'

North Sumatra Stadium, Deli Serdang
Referee: Naufal Adya Fairuski (Indonesia)

== Awards ==
Most Valuable Player	Top Scorer Award	Best Goalkeeper Award
(Australia) Alexander Garbowski	(Australia) Medin Memeti	(Indonesia) Dafa Setiawarman

== Goalscorers ==
There were 75 goals scored in 19 matches, for an average of 3.95 goals per match.

5 goals

- (Australia) Medin Memeti

4 goals

- (Vietnam) Hoàng Công Hậu

3 goals

- (Thailand) Pattaratron Buransuk
- (Thailand) Pichaya Kongsri
- (Thailand) Natthakit Phosri
- (Thailand) Itthimon Tippanet

2 goals

- (Australia) Alex Nunes
- (Australia) Edward Neil
- (Australia) Lawrence Wong
- (Australia) Mathias Macallister
- (Cambodia) Mohamatsorles Seth
- (Indonesia) Arkhan Kaka
- (Indonesia) Dimas Adi Prasetyo
- (Indonesia) Reno Salampessy
- (Malaysia) Arsyad Shamsul Aswadi
- (Thailand) Pirada Larsawat
- (Thailand) Siwakorn Ponsan

1 goal

- (Australia) Alexander Garbowski
- (Australia) Beckham Baker
- (Cambodia) Mathew Sitha
- (Cambodia) Sokea Sreng
- (Indonesia) Irpan Siregar
- (Indonesia) Evandra Florasta
- (Indonesia) Algazani Dwi Sugandi
- (Malaysia) Arif Aiman Za'aba
- (Malaysia) Abid Safaraz Rozaidi
- (Malaysia) Tengku Hasyri Shah Meerza
- (Malaysia) Amar Imran
- (Malaysia) Irfan Aswad Roslan
- (Malaysia) Ierfan Hafizan Hafiz
- (Myanmar) La Min Pyae Sone
- (Myanmar) Swan Zarni
- (Myanmar) Sai Bo Bo Kyaw
- (Singapore) Rae Peh
- (Singapore) Uchenna Eziakor
- (Singapore) Andy Reefqy
- (Singapore) Liska Haaziq
- (Thailand) Kongnat Thuamthongdee
- (Thailand) Sirisaran Chanchaemsai
- (Thailand) Ratchanon Khodchasenee
- (Timor-Leste) Marcio Da Costa
- (Vietnam) Lê Tấn Dũng
- (Vietnam) Nguyễn Văn Bách
- (Vietnam) Nguyễn Quốc Khánh
- (Vietnam) Nguyễn Thiên Phú
- (Vietnam) Hoàng Trọng Duy Khang

1 own goal

- (Brunei) Mahmud Khalish (against Malaysia)
- (Australia) Domenic Marinucci (against Cambodia)
- (Cambodia) Udom Sean (against Thailand)

== Final ranking ==
Pos	Team	Pld	W	D	L	GF	GA	GD	Pts	Final result
1	Australia	4	3	1	0	15	2	+13	10	Champion
2	Thailand	5	4	0	1	20	4	+16	12	Runner up
3	Indonesia (H)	5	4	0	1	9	2	+7	12	Third place
4	Cambodia	4	1	1	2	5	7	−2	4	Fourth place
5	Vietnam	3	2	0	1	9	2	+7	6	Eliminated in group stage
6	Malaysia	3	2	0	1	9	3	+6	6	Eliminated in group stage
7	Singapore	3	1	0	2	4	7	−3	3	Eliminated in group stage
8	Myanmar	3	1	0	2	3	9	−6	3	Eliminated in group stage
9	Timor-Leste	3	0	0	3	1	9	−8	0	Eliminated in group stage
10	Philippines	2	0	0	2	0	13	−13	0	Eliminated in group stage
11	Brunei	3	0	0	3	0	17	−17	0	Eliminated in group stage

Source: Group stage, Knockout stage
(H) Hosts
