= Teladan Stadium =

Stadium in Medan, Indonesia

- Teladan Stadium in 2026

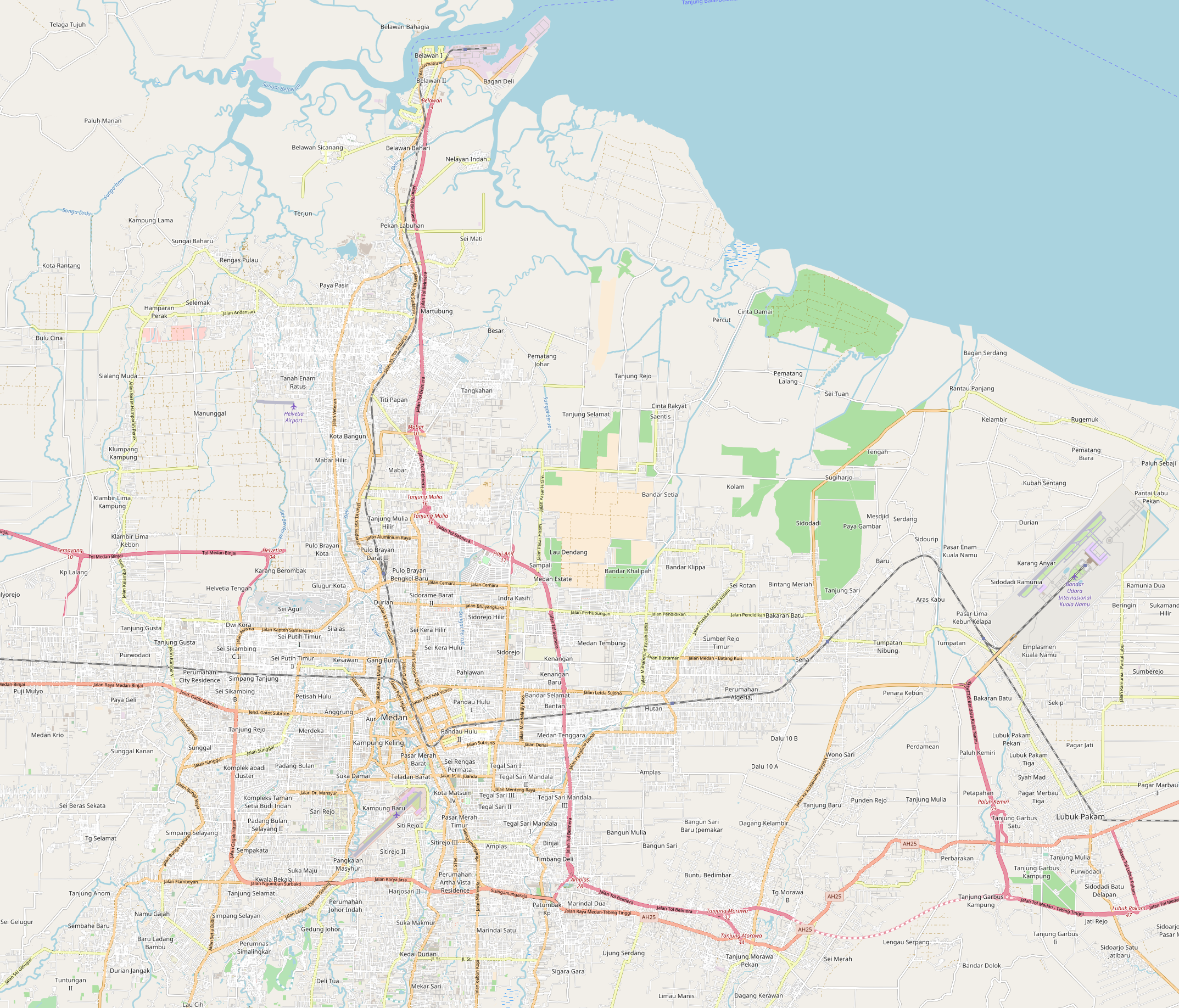
- Location in Medan, Northern Sumatra, Sumatra and Indonesia Teladan Stadium (Northern Sumatra) Teladan Stadium (Sumatra) Teladan Stadium (Indonesia)
- Address: Jalan Stadion, Medan, North Sumatra, 20217; Indonesia
- Location: Medan, North Sumatra
- Coordinates: 3°33′53″N 98°41′44″E
- Owner: Government of Medan City
- Operator: Medan City Department of Parks
- Capacity: 20,000
- Surface: Zeon Zoysia

Construction
- Groundbreaking: 1951
- Opened: 1953
- Renovated: 2023–2026
- Architect: Liem Bwan Tjie

Tenant
- PSMS Medan

Teladan Stadium is a multi-purpose stadium in Medan, Indonesia. It is currently used mostly for football matches. It is the home stadium of PSMS Medan. The stadium holds 20,000 people.
