= South Korea national under-20 football team =

National association football team

Korea Republic U-20
- Nickname(s): Taegeuk Warriors; The Red Devils; Tiger of Asia
- Association: Korea Football Association
- Confederation: AFC (Asia)
- Sub-confederation: EAFF (East Asia)
- Head coach: Kim Jung-soo
- FIFA code: KOR
First colours	Second colours

First international
- South Korea 2–0 Thailand (Kuala Lumpur, Malaya; 19 April 1959)

Biggest win
- South Korea 28–0 Guam (Ho Chi Minh City, Vietnam; 6 November 2007)

Biggest defeat
- Brazil 10–3 South Korea (Kuching, Malaysia; 22 June 1997)

FIFA U-20 World Cup
- Appearances: 17 (first in 1979)
- Best result: Runners-up (2019)

AFC U-20 Asian Cup
- Appearances: 38 (first in 1959)
- Best result: Champions (1959, 1960, 1963, 1978, 1980, 1982, 1990, 1996, 1998, 2002, 2004, 2012)

The South Korea national under-20 football team (Korean: 대한민국 20세 이하 축구 국가대표팀; recognized as Korea Republic by FIFA) represents South Korea in international youth football competitions and also can be managed as under-18 or under-19 team if necessary. South Korean under-20 team won twelve AFC U-20 Asian Cup (AFC Youth Championship) titles and reached the FIFA U-20 World Cup final once, both are the most successful results among Asian teams.

== History ==
=== Red Fury ===
South Korea's under-19 team, which finished third in the qualifying tournament, was initially ineligible to play in the final stage of the 1982 AFC Youth Championship. However, the North Korean FA was punished with a two-year suspension for assaulting a referee at the 1982 Asian Games by the Asian Football Confederation, so South Korea advanced to the final stage instead of North Korea, the runners-up. After winning the tournament, South Korea qualified for the 1983 FIFA World Youth Championship as Asian champions. Manager Park Jong-hwan trained his team with tactics that demanded a lot of endurance and teamwork for the World Youth Championship.

Drawn in a group with Scotland, Australia and the host Mexico, South Korea lost their first game against Scotland, but they advanced to the knockout stage by defeating the other two teams. In the quarter-finals, they faced Uruguay, and won the game 2–1 with two extra time goals by Shin Yon-ho. The news that they reached the semi-finals for the first time in a FIFA competition became a myth in South Korea, a weak country in sports at the time, although it was a youth competition. The foreign press was also interested in South Korea's achievement, describing it as the "Red Fury". South Korea finished the tournament in fourth place after losing to Brazil and Poland, and South Korean defender Kim Pan-keun was named in the official All-Star Team. The name of "Red Devils", the supporters' group for the South Korean national team, was inspired by this story.

=== Korean unified team ===
The Inter-Korean Sports Conferences were held on the recommendation of the International Olympic Committee since 1963, but the conferences always broke down until the 1980s because both sides had not seen eye to eye. In February 1991, however, they decided to make Korean unified teams in table tennis and football. In that same year, both South and North Korea qualified for the FIFA World Youth Championship as winners and runners-up of the 1990 AFC Youth Championship, so they urgently made allied under-20 football team for the world championship despite concerns about communication and teamwork. Their challenge was ended in the quarter-finals.

== Recent results and fixtures ==
The following is a list of match results in the last 12 months, as well as any future matches that have been scheduled.

Win Draw Loss Fixture

=== 2026 ===
31 August 2027 AFC U-20 Asian Cup qualification	Lebanon	2–3	South Korea	Bishkek, Kyrgyzstan
16:00 UTC+6	Kazan 36'; Saad 88'	Report	Kwon Jun-seong 40'; Kim Min-woo 45+4'; Lee Ho-jin 60'	Stadium: Dolen Omurzakov Stadium

6 September 2027 AFC U-20 Asian Cup qualification	South Korea	0–0	Kyrgyzstan	Bishkek, Kyrgyzstan
20:00 UTC+6		Report		Stadium: Dolen Omurzakov Stadium; Referee: Bijan Heydari (Iran)

== All-time results ==
South Korea entered annual AFC Youth Championship from 1959 to 1976 excluding the 1975 tournament and the youth matches of those days were played for 80 minutes.

The FIFA World Youth Championship was founded in 1977 and the AFC Youth Championship became a qualifying tournament of the World Youth Championship. The top two teams (generally finalists) of the AFC Youth Championship could qualify for the World Youth Championship until 1995. The two competitions were held every two years, and introduced 90-minute matches since 1979.

The number of participating teams in the FIFA World Youth Championship was increased from 16 to 24 in 1997, and four Asian countries, generally the semi-finalists in the AFC Youth Championship, has qualified for the competition since then. The FIFA World Youth Championship was renamed the FIFA U-20 World Cup in 2007. The AFC Youth Championship was relaunched as the AFC U-19 Championship in 2008 and the AFC U-20 Asian Cup in 2023.

=== Matches ===
The following is a list of match results in major competitions held by world, continental and regional federations.

Win Draw Loss

Competition	Round	Team scorer(s)	Score	Opponent	Ref.
1959 AFC Youth Championship	Group allocation match	Lee Soon-myung 15'; Cho Yoon-ok 18'	2–0	Thailand	
1959 AFC Youth Championship	Final round	Park Kyung-hwa 1', 13'; Lee Soon-myung 10'	3–2	Japan	
1959 AFC Youth Championship	Final round		1–0	Hong Kong	
1959 AFC Youth Championship	Final round		2–1	Malaya	
1960 AFC Youth Championship	Group B	Chung Sun-cheon 6', 14'; Cho Yoon-ok 8', 34'	4–1	Thailand	
1960 AFC Youth Championship	Group B	Cho Yoon-ok 17'; Chung Sun-cheon 25'; Cha Kyung-bok 34'; Kim Duk-joong 74'	4–2	Indonesia	
1960 AFC Youth Championship	Group B	Cho Yoon-ok 20', 43'; Cha Kyung-bok 29'; Chung Sun-cheon 53'	4–1	Singapore	
1960 AFC Youth Championship	Final	Chung Sun-cheon 1'; Cho Yoon-ok 7', 10'; Cha Kyung-bok 30' (pen.)	4–0	Malaya	
1961 AFC Youth Championship	Group A		1–1	Japan	
1961 AFC Youth Championship	Group A		2–2	Indonesia	
1961 AFC Youth Championship	Group A	Lee Woo-jin 42'; Choi Eun-taek 55'; Lee Poong-gil 62' ? 79'	4–0	Singapore	
1961 AFC Youth Championship	Group A		1–1	South Vietnam	
1961 AFC Youth Championship	Third place match		1–2	Thailand	
1962 AFC Youth Championship	Group B	Joo Min-hwan 30'; Kim Kang-moon 36'; Park In-seon (?); Lim Gook-chan (?)	4–0	Hong Kong	
1962 AFC Youth Championship	Group B	—	0–0	Indonesia	
1962 AFC Youth Championship	Group B	Park In-seon 22', 38', 80'; Joo Min-hwan 51'; Na Yoon-sik 65'	5–0	Singapore	
1962 AFC Youth Championship	Group B	Lim Gook-chan 17', 58', 77'; Na Yoon-sik 72'	4–0	Pakistan	
1962 AFC Youth Championship	Final	Lim Gook-chan 1'	1–2	Thailand	
1963 AFC Youth Championship	Group B	Lee Seung-an 10'; Park In-seon 22', 40'; Bae Kim-su 72'	4–1	Japan	
1963 AFC Youth Championship	Group B	Park In-seon 29' ? 40'; Lee Seung-soo (?)	3–1	Singapore	
1963 AFC Youth Championship	Group B	Han Heung-seon 11'; Park In-seon 49', 70'	3–0	Hong Kong	
1963 AFC Youth Championship	Group B	Chung Kang-ji 13'	1–1	South Vietnam	
1963 AFC Youth Championship	Group B	Kim Chang-eui 20', 24'; Park In-seon 40'	3–1	Ceylon	
1963 AFC Youth Championship	Final	Park In-seon 45', 77'	2–2 (a.e.t.)	Burma	
1964 AFC Youth Championship	Group A	Chung Dong-soo 61'	1–0	Japan	
1964 AFC Youth Championship	Group A	—	0–4	Israel	
1964 AFC Youth Championship	Group A	Kim Ki-bok 22' (pen.); Kim Bak-haeng 48'	2–0	Thailand	
1964 AFC Youth Championship	Third place match	Chung Dong-soo 51'	1–5	Malaysia	
1965 AFC Youth Championship	Group B	—	0–1	Thailand	
1965 AFC Youth Championship	Group B	—	0–2	Burma	
1965 AFC Youth Championship	Group B	Chung Tae-hoon 33'; Hong Kyung-gu 66' ? (?) ? (?)	4–1	India	
1965 AFC Youth Championship	Group B	—	0–1	Malaysia	
1966 AFC Youth Championship	Group C	—	0–0	Israel	
1966 AFC Youth Championship	Group C	Chung Tae-hoon 14'; Kim Young-sik 16'; Choi Sang-cheol (?), 68'; Kim Jae-yong (?)	5–1	Hong Kong	
1966 AFC Youth Championship	Quarter-finals	—	0–1	Thailand	
1967 AFC Youth Championship	Group B	Park Joon-chan 60' (pen.)	1–1	South Vietnam	
1967 AFC Youth Championship	Group B	—	0–3	Indonesia	
1967 AFC Youth Championship	Group B	Park Lee-chun (?) ? (?) ? (?)	7–3	Hong Kong	
1968 AFC Youth Championship	Group A	Kim Byung-chan 11', 17'; Bae Ki-myeon 27'; Park Young-tae 56' (pen.)	4–1	Hong Kong	
1968 AFC Youth Championship	Group A	Kim Byung-chan 41'; Lee Jong-han 67', 74'	3–0	Japan	
1968 AFC Youth Championship	Group A	Cho Jae-deok 13'; Kim In-kwon 22'; Kim Byung-chan 55'	3–1	Thailand	
1968 AFC Youth Championship	Group 2	Cho Jae-deok 17'; Park Young-tae 53'; Yang Sun-kyung 74'	3–1	Philippines	
1968 AFC Youth Championship	Group 2	Kim In-kwon 28'; Lee Kap-soo 33', 68'; Lee Jong-han 36'	4–0	Malaysia	
1968 AFC Youth Championship	Semi-finals	Kim In-kwon 18'	1–1	Burma	
1968 AFC Youth Championship	Third place match	—	0–0	Israel	
1969 AFC Youth Championship	Group C	—	0–1	Israel	
1969 AFC Youth Championship	Group C	Nam Dae-sik 10'; Won Heung-jae 20', 66', 80'; Kim In-kwon 25'; Lim Tae-joo 33'; Cho Kap-rae (?)	7–0	Philippines	
1969 AFC Youth Championship	Group C	Kang Bong-hyun 23'; Lee Jong-han 62'	2–1	Laos	
1969 AFC Youth Championship	Quarter-finals	—	0–2	Iran	
1970 AFC Youth Championship	Group A	Cho Han-heung 23' (pen.); Kwon Yi-tae 40'	2–1	Thailand	
1970 AFC Youth Championship	Group A	Lee Hee-sung 6'; Cho Han-heung 71'; Cho Sung-keun 78'	3–0	Brunei	
1970 AFC Youth Championship	Group A	—	0–1	Hong Kong	
1970 AFC Youth Championship	Quarter-finals	Cho Han-heung 34' (pen.)	1–0	Iran	
1970 AFC Youth Championship	Semi-finals	—	0–1	Indonesia	
1970 AFC Youth Championship	Third place match	Cho Han-heung 44' (?); Lee Hee-sung 48'; Kim Hak-ki 54'; Lee Cha-man (?)	5–0	Japan	
1971 AFC Youth Championship	Group C	Kim Jin-kook 5'; Hwang Nam-seon 7', 20'	3–1	South Vietnam	
1971 AFC Youth Championship	Group C	Cho Han-heung 23'	3–1; Awarded	Hong Kong	
1971 AFC Youth Championship	Group C	Kim Jin-kook 11'	1–1	Israel	
1971 AFC Youth Championship	Quarter-finals	Kim Jin-kook 5'	1–1 (a.e.t.) (3–2 p)	Iran	
1971 AFC Youth Championship	Semi-finals	—	0–0 (a.e.t.) (6–5 p)	Japan	
1971 AFC Youth Championship	Final	—	0–1	Israel	
1972 AFC Youth Championship	Group D		0–0	Laos	
1972 AFC Youth Championship	Group D	Sim Yong-wook 55'	1–0	Iran	
1972 AFC Youth Championship	Group D	Cha Bum-kun 26', 28', 72'; Hong Ho-seon 35'	4–1	Philippines	
1972 AFC Youth Championship	Quarter-finals	Lee Young-moo 50'; Cha Bum-kun 62' (pen.)	2–1	Indonesia	
1972 AFC Youth Championship	Semi-finals	Cha Bum-kun 72'	1–0	Thailand	
1972 AFC Youth Championship	Final	—	0–1	Israel	
1973 AFC Youth Championship	Group A	—	0–0	Bahrain	
1973 AFC Youth Championship	Group A	—	0–0	Lebanon	
1973 AFC Youth Championship	Group A	Yoo Dong-choon 70'	1–0	India	
1973 AFC Youth Championship	Quarter-finals	Song Byung-deok 79'	1–0	Burma	
1973 AFC Youth Championship	Semi-finals	—	0–1	Iran	
1973 AFC Youth Championship	Third place match	Yoo Dong-choon 40'; Park Jong-won 49'; Shin Hyun-ho 59'	3–0	Saudi Arabia	
1974 AFC Youth Championship	Group C	Huh Jung-moo 12' (pen.); Park Min-jae 66'	2–1	Nepal	
1974 AFC Youth Championship	Group C	Yoo Dong-choon 11'; Park Min-jae 38'	2–0	Khmer Republic	
1974 AFC Youth Championship	Group C	Park Jong-won 15', 76'; Park Min-jae 63'	3–1	Malaysia	
1974 AFC Youth Championship	Quarter-finals	Park Byung-chul 53', 75'	2–1	Japan	
1974 AFC Youth Championship	Semi-finals	—	0–3	Iran	
1974 AFC Youth Championship	Third place match	Hyun Jung-woo 27'; Park Byung-chul 68'	2–1	Thailand	
1976 AFC Youth Championship	Group A	Lee Nam-soo 8'; Kim Chang-ho 56'; Oh Gyu-sang 67'; Kim Hyun-chul 73'	4–0	Malaysia	
1976 AFC Youth Championship	Group A	Kim Chang-ho 47'	1–1	India	
1976 AFC Youth Championship	Group A	—	0–1	Iran	
1976 AFC Youth Championship	Quarter-finals	Jang Ki-moon 46' (pen.)	1–0	Indonesia	
1976 AFC Youth Championship	Semi-finals	—	0–1	North Korea	
1976 AFC Youth Championship	Third place match	Kim Chul-ho 17'; Lee Nam-soo 50'	2–1	Thailand	
1977 AFC Youth Championship	Group D	—	0–0	Malaysia	
1977 AFC Youth Championship	Group D	—	0–0	Saudi Arabia	
1977 AFC Youth Championship	Group D	Baek Hyun-young (?) ? (?)	3–0	Jordan	
1977 AFC Youth Championship	Quarter-finals	—	0–0 (a.e.t.) (1–3 p)	Japan	
1978 AFC Youth Championship	Group D	Park Yoon-ki 49'; Lee Tae-ho 75' (pen.)	2–1	China	
1978 AFC Youth Championship	Group D	Chung Hae-won 26'	1–1	Iran	
1978 AFC Youth Championship	Group D	Kim Seok-won 3', 48', 64'; Park Yoon-ki 6', 40'; Chung Hae-won 26'; Park Hang-seo 56' (pen.)	7–0	Afghanistan	
1978 AFC Youth Championship	Quarter-finals	Lee Sang-yong 58'	1–0	Bahrain	
1978 AFC Youth Championship	Semi-finals	—	0–0 (a.e.t.) (6–5 p)	North Korea	
1978 AFC Youth Championship	Final	Kim Seok-won 30'	1–1 (a.e.t.)	Iraq	
1979 FIFA World Youth Championship	Group C	—	0–3	Paraguay	
1979 FIFA World Youth Championship	Group C	Lee Tae-ho 63'	1–0	Canada	
1979 FIFA World Youth Championship	Group C	—	0–0	Portugal	
1980 AFC Youth Championship	Qualification (East); Group B	Choi Soon-ho 13'; Baek Chi-soo 60'	2–0	Thailand	
1980 AFC Youth Championship	Qualification (East); Group B	Kim Kyung-ho 25', 65'; Choi Soon-ho 30', 55'; Lee Won-sik 70'	5–0	Hong Kong	
1980 AFC Youth Championship	Qualification (East); Group B	Choi Soon-ho 24'; Lee Kyung-nam 34', 52', 88'; Yoon Yong-seung 66'	5–0	Indonesia	
1980 AFC Youth Championship	Qualification (East); Group B	Lee Kyung-nam 6', 32'; Ko Eui-seok 36'; Lee Won-sik 53'	4–2	Philippines	
1980 AFC Youth Championship	Qualification (East); Semi-finals	Choi Soon-ho 8', 38'; Lee Kyung-nam 59' (pen.); Baek Chi-soo 69'	4–1	Singapore	
1980 AFC Youth Championship	Qualification (East); Final	Kwak Sung-ho 22'; Choi Soon-ho 54'; Yoon Yong-seung 74'	3–1	Japan	
1980 AFC Youth Championship	—	Kim Seok-won 15'; Choi Soon-ho 32', 72'; Lee Kyung-nam 66'	4–1	Qatar	
1980 AFC Youth Championship	—	Lee Kyung-nam 22'; Baek Chi-soo 42'; Kim Seok-won 78'	3–1	Japan	
1980 AFC Youth Championship	—	Choi Soon-ho 36'	1–1	Bangladesh	
1980 AFC Youth Championship	—	Choi Soon-ho 19'	1–0	Thailand	
1981 FIFA World Youth Championship	Group B	Kwak Sung-ho 7'; Choi Soon-ho 12', 29'; Lee Kyung-nam 88'	4–1	Italy	
1981 FIFA World Youth Championship	Group B	—	0–1	Romania	
1981 FIFA World Youth Championship	Group B	—	0–3	Brazil	
1982 AFC Youth Championship	Qualification (East); Group B	—	0–2	China	
1982 AFC Youth Championship	Qualification (East); Group B	Kim Jun-hyun 28'; Lee Kee-keun 31'; Shin Yon-ho 57'; Kim Jong-min 62'; Kim Heung-kwon (?); Park Guk-chang (?)	6–0	Malaysia	
1982 AFC Youth Championship	Qualification (East); Group B	Kim Jung-eun 2'; Lee Kee-keun 68', 70' (?); No In-woo (?); Lee Seung-hee (?)	6–1	Hong Kong	
1982 AFC Youth Championship	Qualification (East); Group B	Lee Kee-keun 9', 54'; Shin Yon-ho 37', 73'; Lee Tae-hyung 43', 71'	6–0	Singapore	
1982 AFC Youth Championship	Qualification (East); Semi-finals	Lee Kee-keun 3'; Kim Jong-min 10'; Shin Yon-ho 48'	3–5	North Korea	
1982 AFC Youth Championship	Qualification (East); Third place match		4–1	Thailand	
1982 AFC Youth Championship	—	Lee Kee-keun 35'; Kim Heung-kwon 49'; Lee Seung-hee 70'; Kim Jung-eun 79'	4–0	United Arab Emirates	
1982 AFC Youth Championship	—	Lee Kee-keun 66'	1–1	China	
1982 AFC Youth Championship	—	Lee Kee-keun 13'; Shin Yon-ho 15'	2–1	Iraq	
1983 FIFA World Youth Championship	Group A	—	0–2	Scotland	
1983 FIFA World Youth Championship	Group A	No In-woo 29'; Shin Yon-ho 89'	2–1	Mexico	
1983 FIFA World Youth Championship	Group A	Kim Chong-kon 16'; Kim Jong-boo 34'	2–1	Australia	
1983 FIFA World Youth Championship	Quarter-finals	Shin Yon-ho 54', 104'	2–1 (a.e.t.)	Uruguay	
1983 FIFA World Youth Championship	Semi-finals	Kim Jong-boo 14'	1–2	Brazil	
1983 FIFA World Youth Championship	Third place match	Lee Kee-keun 37'	1–2	Poland	
1985 AFC Youth Championship	Qualification (East); Group A	Choo Dae-yeon 10'; Kim Bong-gil (?); Kim Joo-sung 33', 80'	4–0	Hong Kong	
1985 AFC Youth Championship	Qualification (East); Group A	Cha Hee-chul (?); Kim Bong-gil (?); Han Yeon-soo (?)	4–1	Singapore	
1985 AFC Youth Championship	Qualification (East); Group A	—	0–0	Bangladesh	
1985 AFC Youth Championship	Qualification (East); Semi-finals	—	0–0 (a.e.t.) (2–4 p)	Thailand	
1985 AFC Youth Championship	Qualification (East); Third place match		2–0	Bangladesh	
1986 AFC Youth Championship	Qualification; Group 8	Choi Chung-il 54', 112'; Jung Young-jin 74'; Choi Tae-ho 116'	4–2 (a.e.t.)	Japan	
1986 AFC Youth Championship	Group B	Kim Gwang-jin 89'	1–1	Bahrain	
1986 AFC Youth Championship	Group B	Kim Moon-sub 23', 89'; Jung Chul-ho 26', 33', 35'; Kim Jung-hyuk 44'; Choi Chung-il 52', 80'	8–0	Sri Lanka	
1986 AFC Youth Championship	Group B	—	0–1	North Korea	
1988 AFC Youth Championship	Qualification; Group 6	Kim Byung-soo 25'; Kim Do-hoon 50'; Kim Gwi-hwa 65'; Shin Tae-yong 70'	4–0	Burma	
1988 AFC Youth Championship	Qualification; Group 6	Seo Jung-won (?); Shin Tae-yong (?) ? (?) ? (?) ? (?)	7–0	Singapore	
1988 AFC Youth Championship	Group B	Kim Il-gwon 48'; Seo Jung-won 51'; Shin Tae-yong 87'	3–1	Japan	
1988 AFC Youth Championship	Group B	—	0–1	Iraq	
1988 AFC Youth Championship	Group B	—	0–0	United Arab Emirates	
1990 AFC Youth Championship	Qualification; Group 5	Kim Dong-chul 37'; Gwak Kyung-keun 75'; Lim Gi-han (?)	3–0	Malaysia	
1990 AFC Youth Championship	Qualification; Group 5	Lim Gi-han 35'; Lee Tae-hong 37', 55'; Han Sang-ryul 42'	4–0	Pakistan	
1990 AFC Youth Championship	Qualification; Group 5	Lim Gi-han 7'; Moon Sam-jin (?); Kim Dong-chul (?)	3–0	Thailand	
1990 AFC Youth Championship	Qualification; Group 5	Gwak Kyung-keun 14'	1–1	Bangladesh	
1990 AFC Youth Championship	Group B	Cho Jin-ho 90'	1–0	Japan	
1990 AFC Youth Championship	Group B	Cho Jin-ho 72'	1–1	Syria	
1990 AFC Youth Championship	Group B	—	0–0	Bahrain	
1990 AFC Youth Championship	Semi-finals	Seo Dong-won 68'	1–0	Qatar	
1990 AFC Youth Championship	Final	—	0–0 (a.e.t.) (4–3 p)	North Korea	
1991 FIFA World Youth Championship (Participated as Korean unified team.)	Group A	Cho In-chol 88'	1–0	Argentina	
1991 FIFA World Youth Championship (Participated as Korean unified team.)	Group A	Choi Chol 89'	1–1	Republic of Ireland	
1991 FIFA World Youth Championship (Participated as Korean unified team.)	Group A	—	0–1	Portugal	
1991 FIFA World Youth Championship (Participated as Korean unified team.)	Quarter-finals	Choi Chol 40'	1–5	Brazil	
1992 AFC Youth Championship	Qualification; Group 5	—	0–1	Japan	
1992 AFC Youth Championship	Qualification; Group 5	Kim Dae-eui 16'; Choi Yong-soo 50' (pen.)	2–1	China	
1992 AFC Youth Championship	Group B	Woo Sang-gu (?); Cho Hyun (?); Cho Hyun-doo (?); Cha Kwi-hyun (?); Woo Sung-yong (?)	8–1	Thailand	
1992 AFC Youth Championship	Group B	Cho Hyun-doo 2', 10'; Choi Yong-soo 42', 44' (?)	5–1	New Zealand	
1992 AFC Youth Championship	Group B	Cho Hyun-doo (?), 88'; Kim Dae-eui 46'	3–1	Qatar	
1992 AFC Youth Championship	Group B	—	0–4	Saudi Arabia	
1992 AFC Youth Championship	Semi-finals	Lee Ho-sung 40'; Cho Hyun 81'	2–1	Japan	
1992 AFC Youth Championship	Final	—	0–2	Saudi Arabia	
1993 FIFA World Youth Championship	Group C	Watson 32' (o.g.)	1–1	England	
1993 FIFA World Youth Championship	Group C	Cho Jin-ho 32'	1–1	Turkey	
1993 FIFA World Youth Championship	Group C	Lee Ki-hyung 39', 52'	2–2	United States	
1994 AFC Youth Championship	Qualification; Group 6		1–0	Malaysia	
1994 AFC Youth Championship	Qualification; Group 6		9–0	Brunei	
1994 AFC Youth Championship	Qualification; Group 6		2–0	Singapore	
1994 AFC Youth Championship	Group B	Park Sung-bae 6'; Chung Sang-nam 23'; Byun Jae-sub 85'	3–1	Thailand	
1994 AFC Youth Championship	Group B	Park Sung-bae 34'; Kim Sung-il 85'	2–2	Kuwait	
1994 AFC Youth Championship	Group B	Ahn Jung-hwan 62', 87' (pen.)	2–2	Bahrain	
1994 AFC Youth Championship	Group B	—	0–1	Japan	
1996 AFC Youth Championship	Group A	Yang Hyun-jung 2', 81'; Lee Kwan-woo 66', 79'	4–0	Thailand	
1996 AFC Youth Championship	Group A	Seo Ki-bok 55'; Kim Do-kyun 68', 77'	3–0	United Arab Emirates	
1996 AFC Youth Championship	Group A	Park Byung-ju 7'; Seo Ki-bok 34'; Chung Seok-keun 63', 83' (pen.); Back Young-chul 88'	5–2	Bangladesh	
1996 AFC Youth Championship	Group A	Kim Nam-il 47'; Nam Gi-sung 87'	2–1	Iran	
1996 AFC Youth Championship	Semi-finals	Yang Hyun-jung 79'	1–0	Japan	
1996 AFC Youth Championship	Final	Chung Seok-keun 8'; Lee Kwan-woo 49'; Yang Hyun-jung 59'	3–0	China	
1997 FIFA World Youth Championship	Group B	—	0–0	South Africa	
1997 FIFA World Youth Championship	Group B	Park Jin-sub 54', 68' (pen.)	2–4	France	
1997 FIFA World Youth Championship	Group B	Lee Kwan-woo 56'; Chung Seok-keun 73'; Lee Jung-min 89'	3–10	Brazil	
1998 AFC Youth Championship	Qualification; Group 8	Kim Eun-jung 28', 84'; Seol Ki-hyeon 81'	3–2	Indonesia	
1998 AFC Youth Championship	Qualification; Group 8	Kim Eun-jung 10'; Na Hee-geun 47'	2–0	Chinese Taipei	
1998 AFC Youth Championship	Qualification; Group 8	Jung Joo-ha 7', 33', 83'; Na Hee-geun 17'; Seol Ki-hyeon 22', 38', 40', 81'; Kim Gun-hyung 28'; Hong Jung-min 86', 89'	11–0	Philippines	
1998 AFC Youth Championship	Group B	Kim Eun-jung 50', 68'; Lee Dong-gook 75'	3–2	China	
1998 AFC Youth Championship	Group B	—	0–0	Qatar	
1998 AFC Youth Championship	Group B	Lee Dong-gook 3', 63'; Chun Jae-ho 42'	3–0	Iraq	
1998 AFC Youth Championship	Group B	Kim Eun-jung 3'; Lee Dong-gook 21'	2–1	Japan	
1998 AFC Youth Championship	Semi-finals	Na Hee-geun 83'; Lee Beom-jik 90'	2–2 (a.e.t.) (4–3 p)	Kazakhstan	
1998 AFC Youth Championship	Final	Kim Eun-jung 14'; Lee Dong-gook 75'	2–1	Japan	
1999 FIFA World Youth Championship	Group D	Kim Kun-hyung 37'	1–3	Portugal	
1999 FIFA World Youth Championship	Group D	—	0–1	Uruguay	
1999 FIFA World Youth Championship	Group D	Seol Ki-hyeon 3', 35'; Na Hee-geun 22' (pen.); Lee Dong-gook 69'	4–2	Mali	
2000 AFC Youth Championship	Qualification; Group 9	Choi Tae-uk 3', 14', 57'; Park Seung-gwang 18'; Kim Byung-chae 21', 36', 38', 40'; Park Yong-ho 28', 83'; Chun Jae-woon 31'; Kim Hae-chool 88'	12–0	Singapore	
2000 AFC Youth Championship	Qualification; Group 9	Lee Chun-soo (?), 53', 57'; Kim Byung-chae 25'; Kim Hae-chool 58', 60'	7–3	Malaysia	
2000 AFC Youth Championship	Qualification; Group 9	Park Kyu-seon 1', 11', 85'; Ju Kwang-youn 6'; Park Yong-ho 22'; Choi Sung-kuk 57', 68', 90'	8–0	Philippines	
2000 AFC Youth Championship	Qualification; Group 9	Kim Hae-chool 1', 20' (pen.); Ju Kwang-youn 17', 71', 89'; Choi Won-kwon 35'; Kim Wan-soo 39'; Kim Sung-gyu 60'; Choi Sung-kuk 63'; Park Kyu-seon 72'; Cho Byung-kuk 78'; Kim Byung-chae 83'; Kim Young-sam 85'	13–0	Macau	
2000 AFC Youth Championship	Group B	—	0–1	China	
2000 AFC Youth Championship	Group B	Riaz 4' (o.g.); Cho Jae-jin 24', 44'; Kim Byung-chae 32', 86'; Lee Chun-soo 54'; Choi Tae-uk 66'	7–0	Pakistan	
2000 AFC Youth Championship	Group B	Lee Chun-soo 63', 80'; Cho Byung-kuk 82'; Ju Kwang-youn 90'	4–2	United Arab Emirates	
2000 AFC Youth Championship	Group B	—	0–0	Iraq	
2002 AFC Youth Championship	Qualification; Group 8	Choi Sung-kuk 2', 28'; Jung Jo-gook 19', 63', 81' (pen.); Kim Su-hyung 33'; Jung Yoon-sung (?); Park Ju-sung (?)	9–0	Brunei	
2002 AFC Youth Championship	Qualification; Group 8	Jung Yoon-sung (?); Yeo Seung-won (?); Namkung Woong (?); Kim Sung-kil (?); Park Ju-sung (?); Kim Dong-hwan (?); Jang Kyung-jin (?); Lee Jong-min (?) ? (?)	17–0	Guam	
2002 AFC Youth Championship	Group A	Kim Dong-hyun 9'	1–0	Qatar	
2002 AFC Youth Championship	Group A	Kim Dong-hyun 20'; Lee Jong-min 65'	2–0	Uzbekistan	
2002 AFC Youth Championship	Group A	—	0–0	Thailand	
2002 AFC Youth Championship	Quarter-finals	Kim Dong-hyun 47', 84'; Kwon Jip 50'; Jo Sung-yoon 55'; Jung Jo-gook 57'; Kim Su-hyung 76'; Choi Sung-kuk 84'	7–0	India	
2002 AFC Youth Championship	Semi-finals	Jung Jo-gook 15'; Lee Jong-min 88'	2–1	Saudi Arabia	
2002 AFC Youth Championship	Final	Jung Jo-gook 96'	1–0 (a.e.t.)	Japan	
2003 FIFA World Youth Championship	Group F	Lee Ho-jin 51'; Lee Jong-min 70'	2–0	Germany	
2003 FIFA World Youth Championship	Group F	—	0–1	Paraguay	
2003 FIFA World Youth Championship	Group F	—	0–2	United States	
2003 FIFA World Youth Championship	Round of 16	Choi Sung-kuk 38'	1–2 (a.e.t.)	Japan	
2004 AFC Youth Championship	Qualification; Group 14	Lee Sang-hyup 11', 65'; Yoon Chan-gu 12'; Kim Seung-yong 15', 18', 43', 89'; Cho Han-bum 24'; Baek Ji-hoon 26'; Lee Keun-ho 37', 39', 46'	12–0	Mongolia	
2004 AFC Youth Championship	Qualification; Group 14	Cho Won-kwang 6'; Boo Young-tae 9', 40', 57', 73'; Baek Ji-hoon 12'; Lee Sang-suk 55'; Baek Seung-min 61'; Lee Yong-rae 72'; Yoon Chan-gu 77'	10–0	Mongolia	
2004 AFC Youth Championship	Group D	—	0–3	Iraq	
2004 AFC Youth Championship	Group D	Kim Seung-yong 9'; Kim Jin-kyu 13'; Park Chu-young 37', 79'	4–0	Yemen	
2004 AFC Youth Championship	Group D	Park Chu-young 41'	1–1	Thailand	
2004 AFC Youth Championship	Quarter-finals	Kim Seung-yong 39'; Shin Young-rok 105'	2–1 (a.e.t.)	Uzbekistan	
2004 AFC Youth Championship	Semi-finals	Baek Ji-hoon 33'; Park Chu-young 113'	2–2 (a.e.t.) (3–1 p)	Japan	
2004 AFC Youth Championship	Final	Park Chu-young 37', 44'	2–0	China	
2005 FIFA World Youth Championship	Group F	Shin Young-rok 25'	1–2	Switzerland	
2005 FIFA World Youth Championship	Group F	Park Chu-young 89'; Baek Ji-hoon 90+2'	2–1	Nigeria	
2005 FIFA World Youth Championship	Group F	—	0–2	Brazil	
2006 AFC Youth Championship	Qualification; Group 13	Shin Young-rok 2', 25', 26'; Chu Jung-hyun 16'; Kim Myung-woon 29', 80'; Lee Sang-ho 57', 67', 71', 85'; Song Jin-hyung 70', 83'; Lee Sung-jae 87'	13–0	Mongolia	
2006 AFC Youth Championship	Qualification; Group 13	Han Gwan-wook 51'; Chu Jung-hyun 60'	2–0	Hong Kong	
2006 AFC Youth Championship	Group A	Shim Young-sung 14', 61'; Lee Sang-ho 46'	3–0	Jordan	
2006 AFC Youth Championship	Group A	Lee Sang-ho 5', 63'; Shin Young-rok 13', 50', 71' (pen.); Miagkih 20' (o.g.); Park Hyun-beom 84'	7–0	Kyrgyzstan	
2006 AFC Youth Championship	Group A	Shim Young-sung 76'; Song Jin-hyung 84'; Shin Young-rok 90+2'	3–0	India	
2006 AFC Youth Championship	Quarter-finals	Song Jin-hyung 10', 36'	2–1	Australia	
2006 AFC Youth Championship	Semi-finals	Shim Young-sung 1'; Kim Dong-suk 111'	2–2 (a.e.t.) (2–3 p)	Japan	
2006 AFC Youth Championship	Third place match	Shim Young-sung 50'; Lee Chung-yong 76'	2–0	Jordan	
2007 FIFA U-20 World Cup	Group D	Shin Young-rok 38'	1–1	United States	
2007 FIFA U-20 World Cup	Group D	Shim Young-sung 83'; Shin Young-rok 89'	2–3	Brazil	
2007 FIFA U-20 World Cup	Group D	Lee Sang-ho 71'	1–1	Poland	
2008 AFF U-19 Youth Championship	First round	Choi Jung-han 55'	1–0	Thailand	
2008 AFF U-19 Youth Championship	First round	—	0–0	Australia	
2008 AFF U-19 Youth Championship	First round	Ahn Jong-hun 53'	1–0	China	
2008 AFF U-19 Youth Championship	Final	—	0–0 (1–3 p)	Australia	
2008 AFC U-19 Championship	Qualification; Group G	Koo Ja-cheol 3', 19', 57'; Cho Young-cheol 10 goals Lee Seung-yeoul 7', 33', 35'; Seo Yong-duk 8'; Kim Dong-sub 7 goals Hong Jeong-ho 52', 78'; Lee Jong-won 73', 81'	28–0	Guam	
2008 AFC U-19 Championship	Qualification; Group G	Mahendra 71' (o.g.); Lee Seung-yeoul 90+1'; Cho Young-cheol 90+2'	3–0	Indonesia	
2008 AFC U-19 Championship	Qualification; Group G	Lee Seung-yeoul 37'; Lee Jong-won 46'; Cho Young-cheol 56'; Kim Bo-kyung 89'	4–1	Vietnam	
2008 AFC U-19 Championship	Qualification; Group G	Lee Seung-yeoul 2'; Kim Dong-sub 27'; Cho Young-cheol 38'; Park Seung-il 69'	4–0	Australia	
2008 AFC U-19 Championship	Group B	Kim Young-gwon 90+3'	1–0	Syria	
2008 AFC U-19 Championship	Group B	Kim Dong-sub 28'	1–2	United Arab Emirates	
2008 AFC U-19 Championship	Group B	Kim Bo-kyung 23'; Moon Ki-han 87'	2–0	Iraq	
2008 AFC U-19 Championship	Quarter-finals	Yoo Ji-no 21'; Cho Young-cheol 84'; Choi Jung-han 90+2'	3–0	Japan	
2008 AFC U-19 Championship	Semi-finals	—	0–1	Uzbekistan	
2009 FIFA U-20 World Cup	Group C	—	0–2	Cameroon	
2009 FIFA U-20 World Cup	Group C	Kim Min-woo 71'	1–1	Germany	
2009 FIFA U-20 World Cup	Group C	Kim Young-gwon 23'; Kim Bo-kyung 42'; Koo Ja-cheol 75' (pen.)	3–0	United States	
2009 FIFA U-20 World Cup	Round of 16	Kim Bo-kyung 55'; Kim Min-woo 60', 70'	3–0	Paraguay	
2009 FIFA U-20 World Cup	Quarter-finals	Park Hee-seong 31'; Kim Dong-sub 82'	2–3	Ghana	
2010 AFF U-19 Youth Championship	First round	—	0–1	Australia	
2010 AFF U-19 Youth Championship	First round	Lee Ki-je 58'	1–1	Vietnam	
2010 AFF U-19 Youth Championship	First round	—	0–0	Thailand	
2010 AFF U-19 Youth Championship	Third place match	Kim Ryun-do 9'	1–1 (7–6 p)	Vietnam	
2010 AFC U-19 Championship	Qualification; Group E	Lee Jae-gwan 5'; Lee Hak-min 35', 86'; Jang Hyun-soo 58'; Suk Hyun-jun 62'	5–0	Bangladesh	
2010 AFC U-19 Championship	Qualification; Group E	Ji Dong-won 5', 50', 86'; Lim Jin-wook 34'; Baek Sung-dong 45'	5–1	Macau	
2010 AFC U-19 Championship	Qualification; Group E	—	0–1	Vietnam	
2010 AFC U-19 Championship	Qualification; Group E	Lee Jae-gwan 27'; Jang Hyun-soo 46' (pen.); Kim Won-sik 65', 85'; Ji Dong-won 75'; Lim Jin-wook 89'	6–0	Laos	
2010 AFC U-19 Championship	Qualification; Group E	Kim Kyung-jung 62'; Seo Hong-min 88'	2–1	Thailand	
2010 AFC U-19 Championship	Group D	Ji Dong-won 39'; Jung Seung-yong 54'	2–0	Iran	
2010 AFC U-19 Championship	Group D	Ji Dong-won 15'	1–0	Yemen	
2010 AFC U-19 Championship	Group D	—	0–0	Australia	
2010 AFC U-19 Championship	Quarter-finals	Kim Kyung-jung 31'; Hwang Do-yeon 45'; Jung Seung-yong 45+2'	3–2	Japan	
2010 AFC U-19 Championship	Semi-finals	—	0–2	North Korea	
2011 FIFA U-20 World Cup	Group A	Kim Kyung-jung 50'; Jang Hyun-soo 80' (pen.)	2–0	Mali	
2011 FIFA U-20 World Cup	Group A	Kim Young-uk 59'	1–3	France	
2011 FIFA U-20 World Cup	Group A	—	0–1	Colombia	
2011 FIFA U-20 World Cup	Round of 16	—	0–0 (a.e.t.) (6–7 p)	Spain	
2012 AFC U-19 Championship	Qualification; Group E	—	0–1	Thailand	
2012 AFC U-19 Championship	Qualification; Group E	Kim Hyun 9', 11'; Seong Bong-jae 6 goals Do Dong-hyun 24', 37', 66'; Kang Sang-woo 57', 59'; Kim Seung-jun 63', 83'; Choi Jeong-yong 73', 78'; Kim Young-chan 88'	18–0	Guam	
2012 AFC U-19 Championship	Qualification; Group E	Seong Bong-jae 2', 51'; Moon Chang-jin 5', 56'; Heo Yong-joon 50', 87'	6–0	Chinese Taipei	
2012 AFC U-19 Championship	Qualification; Group E	Moon Chang-jin 80'	1–0	Japan	
2012 AFC U-19 Championship	Group B	—	0–0	Iraq	
2012 AFC U-19 Championship	Group B	Heo Yong-joon 22'; Kim Seung-jun 72'	2–1	Thailand	
2012 AFC U-19 Championship	Group B	Moon Chang-jin 80'	1–0	China	
2012 AFC U-19 Championship	Quarter-finals	Moon Chang-jin 2'; Lee Gwang-hoon 49'; Kim Seung-jun 81'; Kwon Chang-hoon 90+5'	4–1	Iran	
2012 AFC U-19 Championship	Semi-finals	Kang Sang-woo 51', 76'; Moon Chang-jin 61' (pen.)	3–1	Uzbekistan	
2012 AFC U-19 Championship	Final	Moon Chang-jin 90+2'	1–1 (a.e.t.) (4–1 p)	Iraq	
2013 FIFA U-20 World Cup	Group B	Kwon Chang-hoon 51' (pen.); Ryu Seung-woo 83'	2–1	Cuba	
2013 FIFA U-20 World Cup	Group B	Ryu Seung-woo 45'; Kim Hyun 76'	2–2	Portugal	
2013 FIFA U-20 World Cup	Group B	—	0–1	Nigeria	
2013 FIFA U-20 World Cup	Round of 16	Song Ju-hun 16'	1–1 (a.e.t.) (8–7 p)	Colombia	
2013 FIFA U-20 World Cup	Quarter-finals	Kwon Chang-hoon 25'; Lee Gwang-hoon 50'; Jung Hyun-cheol 120+2'	3–3 (a.e.t.) (4–5 p)	Iraq	
2014 AFC U-19 Championship	Qualification; Group G	Park In-hyeok 27'; Hwang Hee-chan 50', 71', 77'	4–0	Philippines	
2014 AFC U-19 Championship	Qualification; Group G	Hwang Hee-chan 3' (pen.); Seol Tae-su 18'; Lee Jung-bin 29' (pen.), 76', 90'	5–1	Laos	
2014 AFC U-19 Championship	Qualification; Group G	Seol Tae-su 32' (pen.); Seo Myeong-won 88'	2–3	Indonesia	
2014 AFC U-19 Championship	Group C	Lee Jung-bin 45'; Kim Gun-hee 54', 90+1'; Shim Je-hyeok 60'; Hwang Hee-chan 66' (pen.); Paik Seung-ho 76'	6–0	Vietnam	
2014 AFC U-19 Championship	Group C	—	0–0	China	
2014 AFC U-19 Championship	Group C	Kim Gun-hee 29'	1–2	Japan	
2016 AFC U-19 Championship	Qualification; Group H	Kim Jeong-hwan 23'; Lee Dong-jun 54', 61', 90+1'; Kang Ji-hoon 82'; Kim Si-woo 89'	6–2	Singapore	
2016 AFC U-19 Championship	Qualification; Group H	Kim Dae-won 12', 29'; Kim Seok-jin 21', 79'; Kang Ji-hoon 39', 76'; Lee Dong-jun 73'	7–1	Chinese Taipei	
2016 AFC U-19 Championship	Qualification; Group H	Choi Ik-jin 3', 33', 90+2'; Kim Moo-gun 10'; Kwon Gi-pyo 39'; Jeong Tae-wook 46', 54', 83'; Kim Si-woo 49', 79' (pen.); Kim Geon-ung 68'	11–0	Northern Mariana Islands	
2016 AFC U-19 Championship	Qualification; Group H	Kang Ji-hoon 12'; Kim Moo-gun 90'	2–1	Thailand	
2016 AFC U-19 Championship	Group A	Jeong Tae-wook 13'; Han Chan-hee 41'; Kang Ji-hoon 90+3'	3–1	Thailand	
2016 AFC U-19 Championship	Group A	Cho Young-wook 84', 90+2'	2–1	Bahrain	
2016 AFC U-19 Championship	Group A	Kim Geon-ung 32'	1–2	Saudi Arabia	
2017 FIFA U-20 World Cup	Group A	Lee Seung-woo 36'; Lim Min-hyeok 76'; Paik Seung-ho 81'	3–0	Guinea	
2017 FIFA U-20 World Cup	Group A	Lee Seung-woo 18'; Paik Seung-ho 42' (pen.)	2–1	Argentina	
2017 FIFA U-20 World Cup	Group A	—	0–1	England	
2017 FIFA U-20 World Cup	Round of 16	Lee Sang-heon 81'	1–3	Portugal	
2018 AFC U-19 Championship	Qualification; Group F	Cho Young-wook 10', 51', 61'; Kim Chan 17'; Lee Sang-jun 31', 86'; Lim Jae-hyeok 49', 88'; Lee Kang-in 73' (pen.); Jeong Ho-jin 75'; Kim Hyun-woo 90+3'	11–0	Brunei	
2018 AFC U-19 Championship	Qualification; Group F	Um Won-sang 9', 61'; Oh Se-hun 58'; Lee Jae-ik 77'	4–0	Indonesia	
2018 AFC U-19 Championship	Qualification; Group F	Jeon Se-jin 42'; Cho Young-wook 80', 86'; Lee Kang-in 90+3'	4–0	Timor-Leste	
2018 AFC U-19 Championship	Qualification; Group F	Um Won-sang 11'; Kim Jung-min 38'; Cho Young-wook 45+2' (pen.)	3–0	Malaysia	
2018 AFC U-19 Championship	Group C	Jeon Se-jin 52'	1–1	Australia	
2018 AFC U-19 Championship	Group C	Cho Young-wook 3'; Jeon Se-jin 79'; Choi Jun 90+2'	3–1	Jordan	
2018 AFC U-19 Championship	Group C	Cho Young-wook 45' (pen.), 90+4' (pen.); Kim Hyun-woo 77'	3–1	Vietnam	
2018 AFC U-19 Championship	Quarter-finals	Jeon Se-jin 44'	1–0	Tajikistan	
2018 AFC U-19 Championship	Semi-finals	Jeon Se-jin 23', 33'; Um Won-sang 45+2'	3–1	Qatar	
2018 AFC U-19 Championship	Final	Cho Young-wook 64' (pen.)	1–2	Saudi Arabia	
2019 FIFA U-20 World Cup	Group F	—	0–1	Portugal	
2019 FIFA U-20 World Cup	Group F	Kim Hyun-woo 69'	1–0	South Africa	
2019 FIFA U-20 World Cup	Group F	Oh Se-hun 42'; Cho Young-wook 57'	2–1	Argentina	
2019 FIFA U-20 World Cup	Round of 16	Oh Se-hun 84'	1–0	Japan	
2019 FIFA U-20 World Cup	Quarter-finals	Lee Kang-in 62' (pen.); Lee Ji-sol 90+8'; Cho Young-wook 96'	3–3 (a.e.t.) (3–2 p)	Senegal	
2019 FIFA U-20 World Cup	Semi-finals	Choi Jun 39'	1–0	Ecuador	
2019 FIFA U-20 World Cup	Final	Lee Kang-in 5' (pen.)	1–3	Ukraine	
2020 AFC U-19 Championship	Qualification; Group I	Naufal 23' (o.g.); Kwon Min-jae 27', 58'; Oh Hyeon-gyu 35'; Choi Se-yun 36', 78'; Kwon Hyeok-kyu 40'; Jung Han-min 43'; Lee Kang-hee 47'; An Jae-jun 60'; Kim Sang-jun 83'	11–0	Singapore	
2020 AFC U-19 Championship	Qualification; Group I	Heo Yool 14', 29'; Goh Young-jun 17'	3–0	Myanmar	
2020 AFC U-19 Championship	Qualification; Group I	Hwang Jae-hwan 41' (pen.), 90+4'; Kwon Min-jae 72', 89'	4–1	China	
2020 AFC U-19 Championship	Group B	—	Cancelled	Bahrain	
2020 AFC U-19 Championship	Group B	—	Cancelled	Iraq	
2020 AFC U-19 Championship	Group B	—	Cancelled	Japan	
2023 AFC U-20 Asian Cup	Qualification; Group E	Hussain 1' (o.g.); Lee Young-jun 26'; Lee Seung-won 45+2' (pen.); Lee Jun-sang 47', 69', 76'	6–0	Sri Lanka	
2023 AFC U-20 Asian Cup	Qualification; Group E	Kim Hee-seung 10'; Bae Jun-ho 15'; Lee Young-jun 54', 90+3'; Kim Yong-hak 57' (pen.); Jung Seung-bae 61'; Lee Jun-sang 78'	7–0	Mongolia	
2023 AFC U-20 Asian Cup	Qualification; Group E	Lee Young-jun 34', 74', 82'; Bae Jun-ho 50'; Lee Seung-won 58', 88' (pen.)	6–2	Malaysia	
2023 AFC U-20 Asian Cup	Group C	Kim Yong-hak 30'; Sung Jin-young 34', 58'; Kang Seong-jin 90+1'	4–0	Oman	
2023 AFC U-20 Asian Cup	Group C	Bae Jun-ho 65'; Kang Seong-jin 71'	2–0	Jordan	
2023 AFC U-20 Asian Cup	Group C	—	0–0	Tajikistan	
2023 AFC U-20 Asian Cup	Quarter-finals	Kim Yong-hak 62' (pen.); Sung Jin-young 100'; Choi Seok-hyun 105'	3–1	China	
2023 AFC U-20 Asian Cup	Semi-finals	—	0–0 (a.e.t.) (1–3 p)	Uzbekistan	
2023 FIFA U-20 World Cup	Group F	Lee Seung-won 22'; Lee Young-jun 64'	2–1	France	
2023 FIFA U-20 World Cup	Group F	Kim Yong-hak 58'; Park Seung-ho 62'	2–2	Honduras	
2023 FIFA U-20 World Cup	Group stage	—	0–0	Gambia	
2023 FIFA U-20 World Cup	Round of 16	Lee Young-jun 11'; Bae Jun-ho 19'; Choi Seok-hyun 48'	3–2	Ecuador	
2023 FIFA U-20 World Cup	Quarter-finals	Choi Seok-hyun 95'	1–0 (a.e.t.)	Nigeria	
2023 FIFA U-20 World Cup	Semi-finals	Lee Seung-won 23' (pen.)	1–2	Italy	
2023 FIFA U-20 World Cup	Third place match	Lee Seung-won 24' (pen.)	1–3	Israel	
2025 AFC U-20 Asian Cup	Qualification; Group C	Kim Tae-won 45+1'; Kim Ho-jin 45+5'; Jin Jun-seo 72'	3–0	Kuwait	
2025 AFC U-20 Asian Cup	Qualification; Group C	Kim Myung-jun 3'; Lee Soo-ah 16'; Baek Ga-on 18'; Toves 40' (o.g.); Kim Gyeol 45'; Claridades 50' (o.g.); Baek Min-gyu 51', 88'; Shim Yeon-won 54'; Yoon Do-young 87'	10–0	Northern Mariana Islands	
2025 AFC U-20 Asian Cup	Qualification; Group C	Kim Tae-won 26'; Kim Gyeol 60'; Yoon Do-young 90+2'	3–1	United Arab Emirates	
2025 AFC U-20 Asian Cup	Qualification; Group C	Hong Seok-hyun 15'; Lee Chang-woo 23'	2–1	Lebanon	
2025 AFC U-20 Asian Cup	Group D	Shin Sung 8'; Baek Min-gyu 23'	2–1	Syria	
2025 AFC U-20 Asian Cup	Group D	Yoon Do-young 32'; Kim Tae-won 59', 86'; Park Seung-soo 89'	4–1	Thailand	
2025 AFC U-20 Asian Cup	Group D	Kim Tae-won 90+1'	1–1	Japan	
2025 AFC U-20 Asian Cup	Quarter-finals	Shin Min-ha 26', 56'; Kim Tae-won 61'	3–3 (a.e.t.) (3–1 p)	Uzbekistan	
2025 AFC U-20 Asian Cup	Semi-finals	—	0–0 (a.e.t.) (2–3 p)	Saudi Arabia	
2025 FIFA U-20 World Cup	Group B	Kim Myung-jun 80'	1–2	Ukraine	
2025 FIFA U-20 World Cup	Group B	—	0–0	Paraguay	
2025 FIFA U-20 World Cup	Group B	Kim Hyun-min 24'; Shin Min-ha 58'	2–1	Panama	
2025 FIFA U-20 World Cup	Round of 16	Kim Tae-won 90+6' (pen.)	1–2	Morocco	

=== Results by competition ===
As of 10 October 2025 (after the 2025 FIFA U-20 World Cup)

Competition	Pld	W	D	L	GF	GA	GD	Win %
FIFA U-20 World Cup	71	23	17	31	89	109	−20	32.39
AFC U-20 Asian Cup	195	114	49	32	385	157	+228	58.46
AFC U-20 Asian Cup qualification	76	67	3	6	413	42	+371	88.16
AFF U-19 Youth Championship	8	2	5	1	4	3	+1	25.00
Total	350	206	74	70	891	311	+580	58.86

== Coaching staff ==
Position	Coach
Head coach	(South Korea) Kim Jung-soo
Assistant coach	(South Korea) Kim Geun-chol
Coach	(South Korea) Cho Se-kwon
Goalkeeping coach	(South Korea) Han Il-koo
Fitness coach	(South Korea) Ahn Seung-hyuk

== Players ==
=== Current squad ===
The following players were called up for the 2026 Panda Cup between 11 and 17 November 2026.

No.	Pos.	Player	Date of birth (age)	Club
	GK	Song An-ton	7 December 2007 (age 18)	(Korea Football Association) Busan IPark
	GK	Choi Ju-ho	12 January 2008 (age 18)	(Korea Football Association) Ulsan HD
	GK	Park Do-hun	8 April 2008 (age 18)	(Korea Football Association) Daegu FC
	DF	Go Jeong-min	1 February 2007 (age 19)	(Korea Football Association) Incheon United
	DF	Mo Gyeong-bin	24 March 2007 (age 19)	(Korea Football Association) Suwon Samsung Bluewings
	DF	Hong Sang-won	9 June 2007 (age 19)	(Korea Football Association) Suwon Samsung Bluewings
	DF	Lee Hyo-bin	1 August 2007 (age 19)	(Korea Football Association) Gangwon FC
	DF	Lee Kyung-hyun	9 August 2007 (age 19)	(Danish Football Association) Copenhagen U19
	DF	Lee Jae-hyung	12 September 2007 (age 19)	(Korea Football Association) Yongin FC
	DF	Kim Min-chan	18 October 2007 (age 19)	(German Football Association) VfL Kamen
	DF	Kwon Jun-seong	18 November 2007 (age 18)	(Korea Football Association) Busan IPark
	DF	Cho Young-jun	21 December 2007 (age 18)	(Korea Football Association) Pohang Steelers
	MF	Ko Pil-kwan	1 January 2007 (age 19)	(Korea Football Association) FC Seoul
	MF	Kim Min-woo	7 January 2007 (age 19)	(Korea Football Association) Korea University
	MF	Bae Seung-gyun	22 April 2007 (age 19)	(Royal Dutch Football Association) FC Dordrecht
	MF	An Tae-hoon	8 June 2007 (age 19)	(Korea Football Association) Jeonbuk Hyundai Motors
	MF	Lee Chung-hyun	12 September 2007 (age 19)	(German Football Association) 1. FC Magdeburg
	MF	Lee Yong-jae	2 October 2007 (age 19)	(Korea Football Association) Gangwon FC
	MF	Lee Ji-woo	6 December 2007 (age 18)	(Korea Football Association) Ulsan University
	MF	Kang Dong-hwi	24 December 2007 (age 18)	(Korea Football Association) Jeju SK
	MF	Lee Sung-yun	9 February 2008 (age 18)	(Korea Football Association) Osan High School
	MF	Jeong Hyeon-ung	16 February 2008 (age 18)	(Korea Football Association) FC Seoul
	MF	Kim Ji-hyeok	17 February 2008 (age 18)	(Korea Football Association) Seongnam FC
	FW	Lee Ho-jin	25 March 2007 (age 19)	(Korea Football Association) Busan IPark
	FW	Kim Yun-ho	13 May 2007 (age 19)	(Korea Football Association) Gwangju FC
	FW	Kim Hyeon-oh	12 September 2007 (age 19)	(Korea Football Association) Gyeongnam FC

=== Recent call-ups ===
The following players have also been called up to a South Korea under-20 squad within the last 12 months.

Pos.	Player	Date of birth (age)	Caps	Goals	Club	Latest call-up
GK	Kim Chan-young	9 January 2007 (age 19)			Unattached	Cheonan training camp, June 2026
GK	Lee Han-gyeol	19 July 2007 (age 19)			(South Korea) Jeonbuk Hyundai Motors	Cheonan training camp, June 2026
GK	Sin Jun-seo	6 December 2007 (age 18)			(South Korea) Gyeongnam FC	Jeonnam training camp, March 2026
DF	Lee Jun-woo	31 March 2008 (age 18)			(South Korea) Suwon Samsung Bluewings	Beolgyo training camp, September - October 2026
DF	Kim Gyu-min	27 February 2007 (age 19)			(South Korea) Gyeongnam FC	v. Kyrgyzstan, 6 September 2026
DF	Kim Ju-hyung	20 August 2007 (age 19)			(South Korea) Jeonbuk Hyundai Motors	Cheonan training camp, August 2026
DF	Kim Young-han	15 March 2007 (age 19)			(South Korea) Seongnam FC	Cheonan training camp, July 2026
DF	Jang Seung-woo	14 November 2007 (age 19)			(South Korea) Gyeongnam FC	Cheonan training camp, July 2026
DF	Kong Bae-hyeon	5 March 2007 (age 19)			(South Korea) Gwangju FC	Cheonan training camp, June 2026
DF	Jung Seong-bin	12 May 2007 (age 19)			(South Korea) Ulsan HD	Cheonan training camp, June 2026
DF	Yeo Min-jun	24 October 2007 (age 19)			(South Korea) Suwon Samsung Bluewings	Cheonan training camp, June 2026
DF	Kang Seong-joo	16 February 2007 (age 19)			(South Korea) Yonsei University	Jeonnam training camp, March 2026
DF	Kim Su-hyung	25 June 2007 (age 19)			(South Korea) Jeonbuk Hyundai Motors	Jeonnam training camp, March 2026
DF	Byeon Jeong-woo	19 July 2007 (age 19)			(South Korea) Daegu FC	Jeonnam training camp, March 2026
MF	Lee Jun-seop	30 January 2007 (age 19)			(South Korea) Incheon United	Beolgyo training camp, September - October 2026
MF	Park Seo-bin	10 December 2007 (age 18)			(South Korea) Honam University	Beolgyo training camp, September - October 2026
MF	Kim Ji-sung	11 February 2008 (age 18)			(South Korea) Suwon Samsung Bluewings	Beolgyo training camp, September - October 2026
MF	Kim Bum-jun	25 May 2007 (age 19)			(South Korea) Pohang Steelers	v. Kyrgyzstan, 6 September 2026
MF	Jeong Seong-bin	13 February 2007 (age 19)			(South Korea) Yonsei University	Cheonan training camp, August 2026
MF	Kim Gang	5 July 2007 (age 19)			(South Korea) FC Anyang	Cheonan training camp, August 2026
MF	Yoo Seung-jae	31 March 2008 (age 18)			(United States) Los Angeles FC 2	Cheonan training camp, August 2026
MF	Kim Ye-geon	7 August 2008 (age 18)			(Serbia) Red Star Belgrade	Cheonan training camp, July 2026
MF	Yun Je-hee	19 September 2007 (age 19)			(South Korea) Chungnam Asan	Cheonan training camp, June 2026
MF	Lee Eun-ho	19 January 2008 (age 18)			(South Korea) Gangwon FC	Cheonan training camp, June 2026
MF	Kim Dong-yoon	27 October 2007 (age 19)			(South Korea) Busan IPark	Jeonnam training camp, March 2026
MF	Oh Chang-hwan	1 November 2007 (age 19)			(South Korea) Siheung Citizen	Jeonnam training camp, March 2026
FW	Noh Geon-hee	24 September 2007 (age 19)			(South Korea) Sun Moon University	Beolgyo training camp, September - October 2026
FW	Kim Tae-hyeong	7 February 2007 (age 19)			(South Korea) Korea University	v. Kyrgyzstan, 6 September 2026
FW	Baek Kyung	12 April 2007 (age 19)			(South Korea) Suwon FC	Jeonnam training camp, March 2026
FW	Kim Geon-hee	27 April 2007 (age 19)			(South Korea) Soongsil University	Jeonnam training camp, March 2026
FW	Park Si-hoo	18 August 2007 (age 19)			(Portugal) Arouca	Jeonnam training camp, March 2026
FW	Park Han-sun	20 August 2007 (age 19)			(South Korea) Yonsei University	Jeonnam training camp, March 2026
FW	Han Seok-jin	19 December 2007 (age 18)			(South Korea) Jeonbuk Hyundai Motors	Jeonnam training camp, March 2026
FW	Park Kang-hyun	31 December 2007 (age 18)			(South Korea) Korea University	Jeonnam training camp, March 2026
^{INJ} Withdrew due to injury.^{WD} Player withdrew from the squad due to non-injury issue.^{A} Call up to A team.^{OA} Overage player.

== Competitive record ==
Champions Runners-up Third place Tournament played on home soil

=== FIFA U-20 World Cup ===
FIFA U-20 World Cup record
Year	Round	Pld	W	D	L	GF	GA	Squad
(Tunisia) 1977	Did not qualify							
(Japan) 1979	Group stage	3	1	1	1	1	3	Squad
(Australia) 1981	Group stage	3	1	0	2	4	5	Squad
(Mexico) 1983	Fourth place	6	3	0	3	8	9	Squad
(Soviet Union) 1985	Did not qualify							
(Chile) 1987	Did not qualify							
(Saudi Arabia) 1989	Did not qualify							
(Portugal) 1991	Quarter-finals	4 (Note: Played as Korean unified team.)	1	1	2	3	7	Squad
(Australia) 1993	Group stage	3	0	3	0	4	4	Squad
(Qatar) 1995	Did not qualify							
(Malaysia) 1997	Group stage	3	0	1	2	5	14	Squad
(Nigeria) 1999	Group stage	3	1	0	2	5	6	Squad
(Argentina) 2001	Did not qualify							
(United Arab Emirates) 2003	Round of 16	4	1	0	3	3	5	Squad
(Netherlands) 2005	Group stage	3	1	0	2	3	5	Squad
(Canada) 2007	Group stage	3	0	2	1	4	5	Squad
(Egypt) 2009	Quarter-finals	5	2	1	2	9	6	Squad
(Colombia) 2011	Round of 16	4	1	1	2	3	4	Squad
(Turkey) 2013	Quarter-finals	5	1	3	1	8	8	Squad
(New Zealand) 2015	Did not qualify							
(South Korea) 2017	Round of 16	4	2	0	2	6	5	Squad
(Poland) 2019	Runners-up	7	4	1	2	9	8	Squad
(Argentina) 2023	Fourth place	7	3	2	2	10	10	Squad
(Chile) 2025	Round of 16	4	1	1	2	4	5	Squad
(Azerbaijan) (Uzbekistan) 2027	To be determined							
(Armenia) (Georgia (country)) 2029	To be determined							
Total	Runners-up	71	23	17	31	89	109	17/24

=== AFC U-20 Asian Cup ===
AFC U-20 Asian Cup record								Qualification record					
Year	Round	Pld	W	D	L	GF	GA	Pld	W	D	L	GF	GA
(Malaysia) 1959	Champions	4	4	0	0	8	3	Not held					
(Malaysia) 1960	Champions	4	4	0	0	16	4	Not held					
1961	Fourth place	5	1	3	1	9	6	Not held					
1962	Runners-up	5	3	1	1	14	2	Not held					
(Malaysia) 1963	Champions	6	4	2	0	16	6	Not held					
(South Vietnam) 1964	Fourth place	4	2	0	2	4	9	Not held					
(Japan) 1965	Group stage	4	1	0	3	4	5	Not held					
(Philippines) 1966	Quarter-finals	3	1	1	1	5	2	Not held					
1967	Group stage	3	1	1	1	8	7	Not held					
(South Korea) 1968	Third place	7	5	2	0	18	4	Not held					
1969	Quarter-finals	4	2	0	2	9	4	Not held					
(Philippines) 1970	Third place	6	4	0	2	11	3	Not held					
(Japan) 1971	Runners-up	6	2	3	1	8	5	Not held					
1972	Runners-up	6	4	1	1	8	3	Not held					
(Pahlavi Iran) 1973	Third place	6	3	2	1	5	1	Not held					
1974	Third place	6	5	0	1	11	7	Not held					
(Kuwait) 1975	Did not enter							Not held					
1976	Third place	6	3	1	2	8	4	Not held					
(Pahlavi Iran) 1977	Quarter-finals	4	1	3	0	3	0	Not held					
(Bangladesh) 1978	Champions	6	3	3	0	12	3	Not held					
1980	Champions	4	3	1	0	9	3	6	6	0	0	23	4
1982	Champions	3	2	1	0	7	2	6	4	0	2	25	9
(United Arab Emirates) 1985	Did not qualify							5	3	2	0	10	1
(Saudi Arabia) 1986	Group stage	3	1	1	1	9	2	1	1	0	0	4	2
(Qatar) 1988	Group stage	3	1	1	1	3	2	2	2	0	0	11	0
(Indonesia) 1990	Champions	5	2	3	0	3	1	4	3	1	0	11	1
(United Arab Emirates) 1992	Runners-up	6	4	0	2	18	10	2	1	0	1	2	2
(Indonesia) 1994	Group stage	4	1	2	1	7	6	3	3	0	0	12	0
(South Korea) 1996	Champions	6	6	0	0	18	3	Qualified as hosts					
1998	Champions	6	4	2	0	12	6	3	3	0	0	16	2
(Iran) 2000	Group stage	4	2	1	1	11	3	4	4	0	0	40	3
(Qatar) 2002	Champions	6	5	1	0	13	1	2	2	0	0	26	0
(Malaysia) 2004	Champions	6	3	2	1	11	7	2	2	0	0	22	0
(India) 2006	Third place	6	5	1	0	19	3	2	2	0	0	15	0
(Saudi Arabia) 2008	Semi-finals	5	3	0	2	7	3	4	4	0	0	39	1
(China) 2010	Semi-finals	5	3	1	1	6	4	5	4	0	1	18	3
(United Arab Emirates) 2012	Champions	6	4	2	0	11	4	4	3	0	1	25	1
(Myanmar) 2014	Group stage	3	1	1	1	7	2	3	2	0	1	11	4
(Bahrain) 2016	Group stage	3	2	0	1	6	4	4	4	0	0	26	4
(Indonesia) 2018	Runners-up	6	4	1	1	12	6	4	4	0	0	22	0
(Uzbekistan) ~~2020~~	Cancelled							3	3	0	0	18	1
(Uzbekistan) 2023	Semi-finals	5	3	2	0	9	1	3	3	0	0	19	2
(China) 2025	Semi-finals	5	2	3	0	10	6	4	4	0	0	18	2
Total	12 titles	195	114	49	32	385	157	76	67	3	6	413	42

=== Other competitions ===
Competition	Round	Pld	W	D	L	GF	GA
(Thailand) 2008 AFF U-19 Youth Championship	Runners-up	4	2	2	0	2	0
(Vietnam) 2010 AFF U-19 Youth Championship	Third place	4	0	3	1	2	3

== Head-to-head record ==
The following table shows South Korea's head-to-head record in the FIFA U-20 World Cup, AFC U-20 Asian Cup and AFF U-19 Youth Championship, excluding minor competitions and friendlies, as of 10 October 2025 (after the 2025 FIFA U-20 World Cup).

Opponent	Pld	W	D	L	GF	GA	GD	Win %
Afghanistan	1	1	0	0	7	0	+7	100.00
Argentina	3	3	0	0	5	2	+3	100.00
Australia	8	3	4	1	9	4	+5	37.50
Bahrain	6	2	4	0	6	4	+2	33.33
Bangladesh	6	3	3	0	14	4	+10	50.00
Brazil	6	0	0	6	7	25	−18	0.00
Brunei	4	4	0	0	32	0	+32	100.00
Cameroon	1	0	0	1	0	2	−2	0.00
Canada	1	1	0	0	1	0	+1	100.00
China	13	9	2	2	22	10	+12	69.23
Chinese Taipei	3	3	0	0	15	1	+14	100.00
Colombia	2	0	1	1	1	2	−1	0.00
Cuba	1	1	0	0	2	1	+1	100.00
Ecuador	2	2	0	0	4	2	+2	100.00
England	2	0	1	1	1	2	−1	0.00
France	3	1	0	2	5	8	−3	33.33
Gambia	1	0	1	0	0	0	+0	0.00
Germany	2	1	1	0	3	1	+2	50.00
Ghana	1	0	0	1	2	3	−1	0.00
Guam	3	3	0	0	63	0	+63	100.00
Guinea	1	1	0	0	3	0	+3	100.00
Honduras	1	0	1	0	2	2	+0	0.00
Hong Kong	12	11	0	1	44	8	+36	91.67
India	5	4	1	0	16	2	+14	80.00
Indonesia	12	7	2	3	26	14	+12	58.33
Iran	11	5	2	4	12	11	+1	45.45
Iraq	10	3	5	2	12	10	+2	30.00
Israel	8	0	3	5	2	11	−9	0.00
Italy	2	1	0	1	5	3	+2	50.00
Japan	30	20	6	4	56	26	+30	66.67
Jordan	5	5	0	0	13	1	+12	100.00
Kazakhstan	1	0	1	0	2	2	+0	0.00
Khmer Republic	1	1	0	0	2	0	+2	100.00
Kuwait	2	1	1	0	5	2	+3	50.00
Kyrgyzstan	1	1	0	0	7	0	+7	100.00
Laos	4	3	1	0	13	2	+11	75.00
Lebanon	2	1	1	0	2	1	+1	50.00
Macau	2	2	0	0	18	1	+17	100.00
Malaysia (Note: Including Malaya)	14	11	1	2	44	13	+31	78.57
Mali	2	2	0	0	6	2	+4	100.00
Mexico	1	1	0	0	2	1	+1	100.00
Mongolia	4	4	0	0	42	0	+42	100.00
Morocco	1	0	0	1	1	2	−1	0.00
Myanmar (Note: Including Burma)	6	3	2	1	11	5	+6	50.00
Nepal	1	1	0	0	2	1	+1	100.00
New Zealand	1	1	0	0	5	1	+4	100.00
Nigeria	3	2	0	1	3	2	+1	66.67
North Korea	6	0	2	4	3	9	−6	0.00
Northern Mariana Islands	2	2	0	0	21	0	+21	100.00
Oman	1	1	0	0	4	0	+4	100.00
Pakistan	3	3	0	0	15	0	+15	100.00
Panama	1	1	0	0	2	1	+1	100.00
Paraguay	4	1	1	2	3	4	−1	25.00
Philippines	7	7	0	0	41	4	+37	100.00
Poland	2	0	1	1	2	3	−1	0.00
Portugal	6	0	2	4	4	10	−6	0.00
Qatar	6	5	1	0	12	3	+9	83.33
Republic of Ireland	1	0	1	0	1	1	+0	0.00
Romania	1	0	0	1	0	1	−1	0.00
Saudi Arabia	8	2	2	4	7	11	−4	25.00
Scotland	1	0	0	1	0	2	−2	0.00
Senegal	1	0	1	0	3	3	+0	0.00
Singapore	12	12	0	0	68	6	+62	100.00
South Africa	2	1	1	0	1	0	+1	50.00
Spain	1	0	1	0	0	0	+0	0.00
Sri Lanka (Note: Including Ceylon)	3	3	0	0	17	1	+16	100.00
Switzerland	1	0	0	1	1	2	−1	0.00
Syria	3	2	1	0	4	2	+2	66.67
Tajikistan	2	1	1	0	1	0	+1	50.00
Thailand	30	21	4	5	60	21	+39	70.00
Timor-Leste	1	1	0	0	4	0	+4	100.00
Turkey	1	0	1	0	1	1	+0	0.00
Ukraine	2	0	0	2	2	5	−3	0.00
United Arab Emirates	6	4	1	1	15	5	+10	66.67
United States	4	1	2	1	6	5	+1	25.00
Uruguay	2	1	0	1	2	2	+0	50.00
Uzbekistan	6	3	2	1	10	6	+4	50.00
Vietnam (Note: Including South Vietnam)	10	4	5	1	21	9	+12	40.00
Yemen	2	2	0	0	5	0	+5	100.00
Total	350	206	74	70	891	311	+580	58.86

== See also ==
- Football in South Korea
- Korea Football Association
- South Korea national football team
- South Korea national football B team
- South Korea national under-23 football team
- South Korea national under-17 football team
- South Korea women's national under-20 football team
