= Lee Seung-won (footballer) =

South Korean footballer (born 2003)

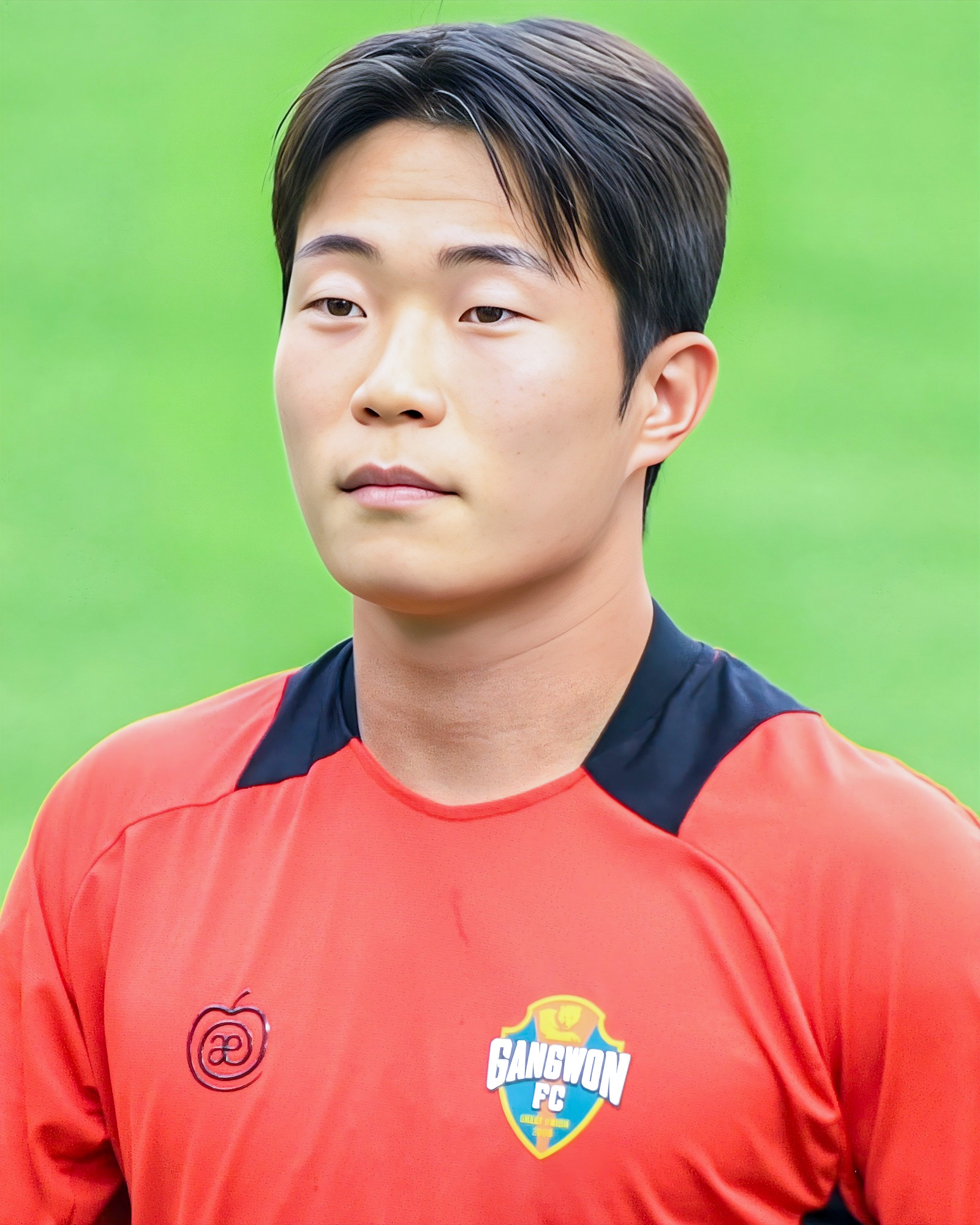
- Lee in 2026

Personal information
- Date of birth: 6 March 2003 (age 23)
- Place of birth: Yongin, South Korea
- Height: 1.74 m (5 ft 9 in)
- Position: Midfielder

Team information
- Current team: Gangwon FC
- Number: 8

Youth career
- 2013–2015: Coerver FC
- 2016–2018: Wonsam Middle School
- 2019: Shingal High School
- 2020–2021: Dukyoung High School

College career
Years	Team	Apps	(Gls)
2022	Dankook University		

Senior career*
Years	Team	Apps	(Gls)
2023	Gangwon FC B	5	(0)
2023–	Gangwon FC	29	(0)
2024–2025	→ Gimcheon Sangmu (draft)	40	(2)

International career^{‡}
2022–2023	South Korea U20	21	(8)
2025–	South Korea U23	15	(2)
2025–	South Korea	2	(0)
Medal record
Men's football
Representing South Korea
Asian Games
Gold medal – first place	2026 Aichi–Nagoya
EAFF Championship
Runner-up	2025 South Korea
- * Club domestic league appearances and goals as of 30 August 2026 ‡ National team caps and goals as of 3 October 2026

- Lee Seung-won
- Hangul: 이승원
- Hanja: 李承原
- RR: I Seungwon
- MR: I Sŭngwŏn

Lee Seung-won (Korean: 이승원; born 6 March 2003) is a South Korean footballer who currently plays as a midfielder for Gangwon FC and the South Korea national team.

== Club career ==
Lee played for a number of teams in Yongin in the Gyeonggi Province of South Korea before his performance at the 2021 National High School Competition, where he won the best player award, caught the attention of a number of professional clubs. However, after breaking his toe during a tournament, he was forced to reconsider his options, and eventually enrolled at the Dankook University in 2022.

After playing at Dankook University in the U-League, a number of scouts from K League 1 side Gangwon FC came to watch Lee, as well as club president Lee Young-pyo. At the end of his first university season, Gangwon announced that they had signed Lee ahead of the 2023 season. He played for the reserve team in three K4 League matches in the first half of his first senior season. He could play for the first-string team after showing good performance in the 2023 FIFA U-20 World Cup.

== International career ==
Lee first started representing South Korea at under-19 level in 2022, where he captained the side at a friendly tournament in Lisbon, Portugal. He was called up to the under-20 side in January 2023, for a training camp in Murcia, Spain. The following month, coach Kim Eun-jung called him to the side for the 2023 AFC U-20 Asian Cup, where he was named captain.

In the first match, a 4–0 win over Oman, Lee dribbled the ball and provided an assist to Kim Yong-hak to make the opening goal after intercepting opponent's misplaced pass. Having progressed from their group, South Korea faced China in the quarter-finals, but this game saw Lee leave the field early due to injury. South Korea qualified for the 2023 FIFA U-20 World Cup by reaching the semi-finals after a win over China. Following his injury in the game against China, Lee absented in the semi-final loss on penalties to the eventual champions Uzbekistan.

Lee retained the captaincy of the under-20 side for the 2023 FIFA U-20 World Cup. He had one goal and one assist in the opening game, a 2–1 win over France. Following two draws against Honduras and the Gambia, including an assist in the former, he notched his third assist of the tournament in a 3–2 win over Ecuador in the round of 16. South Korea then beat Nigeria 1–0 after extra time in the quarter-final, with Lee providing an assist for defender Choi Seok-hyeon to score the winning goal. Lee scored on a penalty kick each in a 2–1 semi-final loss to Italy and a 3–1 third place play-off loss to Israel. Contributing to South Korea's seven goals, he received the Bronze Ball, awarded to the third-best player of the tournament.

Lee made his senior international debut in a 3–0 win over China at the 2025 EAFF E-1 Football Championship.

== Career statistics ==
=== Club ===
As of matches played 30 August 2026

Appearances and goals by club, season and competition
Club	Season	League			Cup		Continental		Other		Total	
Club	Season	Division	Apps	Goals	Apps	Goals	Apps	Goals	Apps	Goals	Apps	Goals
Gangwon FC B	2023	K4 League	5	0	—		—		—		5	0
Gangwon FC	2023	K League 1	13	0	0	0	—		1 (Note: Appearance in K League promotion-relegation play-offs)	0	14	0
Gangwon FC	2025	K League 1	3	0	0	0	2 (Note: Appearance in AFC Champions League Elite)	0	—		5	0
Gangwon FC	2026	K League 1	13	0	1	0	4	0	—		18	0
Gangwon FC	Total		29	0	1	0	6	0	1	0	37	0
Gimcheon Sangmu (draft)	2024	K League 1	8	1	0	0	—		—		8	1
Gimcheon Sangmu (draft)	2025	K League 1	32	1	0	0	—		—		32	1
Gimcheon Sangmu (draft)	Total		40	2	0	0	—		—		40	2
Career total			74	2	1	0	6	0	1	0	82	2

== Honours ==
South Korea

- EAFF Championship runner-up: 2025

South Korea U23

- Asian Games: 2026

Individual

- FIFA U-20 World Cup Bronze Ball: 2023
- K League Young Player of the Month: June 2025, August 2025, September 2025
- K League 1 Young Player of the Year: 2025
