= Cho Hyun =

Cho Hyun may refer to:

- Cho Hyun (footballer) (born 1974), South Korean footballer
- Cho Hyun (diplomat) (born 1957), South Korean diplomat
