= Lee Tae-hong =

South Korean association football player

Lee Tae-hong 이태홍
Personal information
- Full name: Lee Tae-hong
- Date of birth: October 1, 1971 (age 55)
- Place of birth: South Korea
- Height: 1.88 m (6 ft 2 in)
- Position: Forward

Youth career
- 1988–1991: Daegu University

Senior career*
Years	Team	Apps	(Gls)
1992–1997	Ilhwa Chunma; Cheonan Ilhwa Chunma	107	(13)
1997–1999	Bucheon SK	18	(4)

International career
1987	South Korea U-17	4	(1)
1991	South Korea U-20	4	(0)
1991–1992	South Korea U-23	0	(0)
1993–1994	South Korea	1	(0)
- * Club domestic league appearances and goals

- Lee Tae-hong
- Hangul: 이태홍
- Hanja: 李太洪
- RR: I Taehong
- MR: I T'aehong

Lee Tae-hong (Korean: 이태홍; born October 1, 1971) is a South Korean former footballer who played as a forward.

He started professional career at Ilhwa Chunma in 1992 and he transferred to Bucheon SK in April 1997. He was captain of Unified Korea national under-17 football team in 1991 FIFA World Youth Championship.
