= Lim Jin-wook =

South Korean footballer

Personal information
- Full name: Lim Jin-wook
- Date of birth: 22 April 1991 (age 35)
- Place of birth: South Korea
- Height: 1.82 m (5 ft 11 1/2 in)
- Position: Midfielder

Team information
- Current team: Chungju Hummel
- Number: 19

Youth career
- 2010–2013: Dongguk University

Senior career*
Years	Team	Apps	(Gls)
2014–2015	Chungju Hummel	39	(9)
2016	Cheongju City		
2017	Paju Citizen		
2018	Chuncheon		

International career
2010	South Korea U-20		
- * Club domestic league appearances and goals as of 24 December 2015

Lim Jin-wook (Korean: 임진욱; born 22 April 1991) is a South Korean footballer who played as midfielder for Chungju Hummel in K League Challenge.

== Career ==
He was selected by Chungju Hummel in 2014 K League draft. He made his debut goal in the league game against Daegu FC on 8 June.
