= Chung Seok-keun =

South Korean footballer

Chung Seok-Keun 정석근
Personal information
- Full name: Chung Seok-Keun
- Date of birth: November 25, 1977 (age 48)
- Place of birth: South Korea
- Height: 1.78 m (5 ft 10 in)
- Position: Forward

Youth career
- Ajou University

Senior career*
Years	Team	Apps	(Gls)
2000–2001	Busan I'Cons	8	(1)
2002–2003	Gwangju Sangmu Phoenix (Army)	1	(0)
2004–2005	Incheon Korail		
2008–2010	Incheon Korail		

International career
1997	South Korea U-20	3	(0)
1999	South Korea U-23	1	(0)
- * Club domestic league appearances and goals

- Chung Seok-keun
- Hangul: 정석근
- Hanja: 鄭石根
- RR: Jeong Seokgeun
- MR: Chŏng Sŏkkŭn

Chung Seok-Keun (born November 25, 1977) is a South Korean football player who is playing for National League side Incheon Korail. Jung has played in the K-League for two sides, making his professional debut for Busan I'cons in 2000 before joining Gwangju Sangmu Phoenix (army) for the 2002 season. He signed for Incheon Korail in 2004, and was voted league MVP in 2005 as Incheon Korail lifted the K2 League championship. He rejoined Incheon Korail in mid-2008.

== Club career ==
- 2000-2001 Busan I'Cons
- 2002-2003 Gwangju Sangmu Phoenix - Military service
- 2004-2005 Incheon Korail
- 2008–2010 Incheon Korail
