= Choi Seok-hyun =

South Korean footballer (born 2003)

Personal information
- Date of birth: 13 January 2003 (age 23)
- Place of birth: Seoul, South Korea
- Height: 1.78 m (5 ft 10 in)
- Position: Right back

Team information
- Current team: Ulsan HD
- Number: 96

Youth career
- 2019–2021: Hyundai High School

Senior career*
Years	Team	Apps	(Gls)
2024–	Ulsan HD	41	(2)
2024	→ Chungbuk Cheongju (loan)	16	(0)

International career^{‡}
2017	South Korea U14	1	(0)
2022–2023	South Korea U20	16	(3)
2025–	South Korea U23	15	(0)
Medal record
Men's football
Representing South Korea
Asian Games
Gold medal – first place	2026 Aichi–Nagoya
Korean name
Hangul	최석현
RR	Choe Seokhyeon
MR	Ch'oe Sŏkhyŏn
- * Club domestic league appearances and goals as of 17 October 2026 ‡ National team caps and goals as of 3 October 2026

Choi Seok-hyun (Korean: 최석현; born 13 January 2003) is a South Korean footballer who plays as a Right back for Ulsan HD in the K League 1.

== Club career ==
In January 2024, Choi Seok-hyun joined Ulsan HD and was immediately loaned to Chungbuk Cheongju FC.

In December 2024, he returns to Ulsan.

== Career statistics ==
=== Club ===
As of 17 October 2026

Appearances and goals by club, season and competition
Club	Season	League			Cup		Continental		Other		Total	
Club	Season	Division	Apps	Goals	Apps	Goals	Apps	Goals	Apps	Goals	Apps	Goals
Chungbuk Cheongju (loan)	2024	K League 2	16	0	1	0	—		—		17	0
Ulsan HD	2025	K League 1	23	0	0	0	6 (Note: Appearances in AFC Champions League Elite)	0	1 (Note: Appearances in FIFA Club World Cup)	0	30	0
Ulsan HD	2026	K League 1	18	2	1	0	1	0	—		20	2
Ulsan HD	Total		41	2	1	0	7	0	1	0	50	2
Career total			57	2	2	0	7	0	1	0	67	2

== Honours ==
South Korea U23

- Asian Games: 2026
