= An Se-uk =

North Korean footballer

Personal information
- Date of birth: 13 March 1948
- Place of birth: Western District, Pyongyang, North Korea
- Height: 1.68 m (5 ft 6 in)

International career
Years	Team	Apps	(Gls)
1975	North Korea	1	(1)
1976	North Korea		

Managerial career
- 1991: Korea U20

An Se-uk (Korean: 안세욱; born 13 March 1948) is a North Korean footballer and coach. He represented North Korea in the 7th Asian Games, the 8th Asian Games, and the 1976 Summer Olympics. He was also the head coach of the united Korean youth football team during the 1991 FIFA World Youth Championship.

== Early life ==
An Se-wook was born on March 13, 1948, in the Western District of Pyongyang, North Korea. He started playing football at the Inhung Middle School. In 1968, An graduated from the Department of Physical Education at Pyongyang University.

== Career ==
An represented North Korea in the 7th Asian Games, the 8th Asian Games, and the 1976 Summer Olympics in Montreal. He received the title of distinguished athlete for the team's joint victory with South Korea at the 8th Asian Games. An is a midfielder.

An retired from football in 1980 and became a coach for the April 25 Sports Club before becoming the chief coach of the Ordinary Club (Korean: 보통강구락부).

== Personal life ==
An lives in Pyongyang and has a wife and three sons.

== Career statistics ==
=== International ===
National team	Year	Apps	Goals	Ref
North Korea	1975	1	1	
Total		1	1	

=== International goals ===
Scores and results list North Korea's goal tally first, score column indicates score after each North Korea goal.

List of international goals scored by Kim
No.	Date	Venue	Opponent	Score	Result	Competition	Ref
1	17 June 1975	Government Stadium, Hong Kong	Japan	1–0	1–0	1976 AFC Asian Cup qualification	
