= Korea national under-20 football team =

National association football team

Korea
- Association: DPR Korea Football Association; Korea Football Association
- Other affiliation: Inter-Korean Sports Conferences
- Confederation: AFC (Asia)
- Head coach: An Se-uk
- Top scorer: Cho In-chol (2)
| First colours | Second colours |

First international
- Argentina 0–1 Korea (Lisbon, Portugal; 15 June 1991)

Last international
- Brazil 5–1 Korea (Porto, Portugal; 22 June 1991)

Biggest win
- Argentina 0–1 Korea (Lisbon, Portugal; 15 June 1991)

Biggest defeat
- Brazil 5–1 Korea (Porto, Portugal; 22 June 1991)

FIFA U-20 World Cup
- Appearances: 1 (first in 1991)
- Best result: Quarter-finals (1991)

The Korea national under-20 football team, also known as the Korean unified football team, was the national under-20 team of Korea, being a combined representative team representing both South Korea and North Korea. Their only participation in FIFA-sanctioned tournaments was at the 1991 FIFA World Youth Championship.

== History ==
The Inter-Korean Sports Conferences were held on the recommendation of the International Olympic Committee since 1963, but the conferences always broke down until the 1980s because both sides had not seen eye to eye. In February 1991, however, they decided to make Korean unified teams in table tennis and football.

In that same year, both South and North qualified for the FIFA World Youth Championship as winners and runners-up of the 1990 AFC Youth Championship, so they urgently made allied under-20 football team for the world championship despite concerns about communication and teamwork. Ten South Korean players and eight North Korean players formed the unified team, and they were managed by North Korean coach An Se-uk. The Korean Unification Flag, which composed of a blue image of the Korean Peninsula over a white background, was the symbol used by the team which competed under the name "Korea".

Korea began their World Youth Championship run by playing against favorites Argentina. The only goal of the match was a 30-yard strike goal made by North Korean footballer, Cho In-chol in the 88th minute which secured Korea's only win in the group stage. The Korean team would have lost its group stage match against Ireland but North Korean footballer Choi Chol made an equalizer in the 89th minute. They managed to advance to the knockout stage, although they conceded their last group stage match against hosts and eventual champions Portugal by a solitary goal, However, they suffered their worst defeat in the quarter-final match against Brazil.

== Results ==
| 15 June 1991 1991 FIFA World Youth Championship (Group A) | Argentina | 0–1 | Korea | Lisbon, Portugal |
| 19:00 | | Report | Cho In-chol 88' | Stadium: Estádio da Luz; Attendance: 2,000; Referee: Ernesto Filippi (Uruguay) |

| 17 June 1991 1991 FIFA World Youth Championship (Group A) | Republic of Ireland | 1–1 | Korea | Lisbon, Portugal |
| 19:00 | McCarthy 58' | Report | Choi Chol 89' | Stadium: Estádio da Luz; Attendance: 5,500; Referee: Robert Sawtell (Canada) |

| 20 June 1991 1991 FIFA World Youth Championship (Group A) | Portugal | 1–0 | Korea | Lisbon, Portugal |
| 21:30 | Torres 42' | Report | | Stadium: Estádio da Luz; Attendance: 38,000; Referee: Enrique Marín Gallo (Chile) |

| 22 June 1991 1991 FIFA World Youth Championship (Quarter-finals) | Brazil | 5–1 | Korea | Porto, Portugal |
| 21:30 | Marquinhos 15'; Élber 41', 67'; Djair 47', 53' | Report | Choi Chol 40' | Stadium: Estádio das Antas; Attendance: 25,000; Referee: Guy Goethals (Belgium) |

== Coaching staff ==
| Position | Name |
|---|---|
| Manager | (North Korea) An Se-uk |
| Assistant coach | (South Korea) Nam Dae-sik |

== Players ==
| No. | Pos. | Player | Date of birth (age) | Caps | Club |
|---|---|---|---|---|---|
| 1 | GK | Kim Jong-son | 27 August 1972 (aged 18) | | (North Korea) Pyongyang Athletics College |
| 2 | DF | Chong Gang-song | 15 October 1973 (aged 17) | | (North Korea) Pyongyang Athletics Institute |
| 3 | DF | Kang Chul | 2 November 1971 (aged 19) | | (South Korea) Yonsei University |
| 4 | DF | Park Chul | 20 August 1973 (aged 17) | | (South Korea) Daegu University |
| 5 | MF | No Tae-gyeong | 22 April 1972 (aged 19) | | (South Korea) POSCO Atoms |
| 6 | DF | Jang Hyeon-ho | 14 October 1972 (aged 18) | | (South Korea) Korea University |
| 7 | MF | Kim Jong-man | 16 December 1972 (aged 18) | | (North Korea) Pyongyang Athletics College |
| 8 | MF | Cho Jin-ho | 2 August 1973 (aged 17) | | (South Korea) Kyung Hee University |
| 9 | FW | Seo Dong-won | 12 December 1973 (aged 17) | | (South Korea) Jungdong High School |
| 10 | FW | Yun Chol | 27 October 1972 (aged 18) | | (North Korea) Pyongyang College of Education |
| 11 | DF | Cho In-chol | 2 October 1973 (aged 17) | | (North Korea) Pyongyang Athletics College |
| 12 | FW | Han Yeon-cheol | 30 March 1972 (aged 19) | | (South Korea) Korea University |
| 13 | FW | Choi Yong-son | 10 October 1972 (aged 18) | | (North Korea) Pyongyang Athletics College |
| 14 | MF | Ri Chang-ha | 23 August 1972 (aged 18) | | (North Korea) Pyongyang College of Education |
| 15 | FW | Choi Chol | 18 December 1973 (aged 17) | | (North Korea) Pyongyang Athletics College |
| 16 | MF | Lee Tae-hong | 1 October 1971 (aged 19) | | (South Korea) Daegu University |
| 17 | DF | Lee Lim-saeng | 18 November 1971 (aged 19) | | (South Korea) Korea University |
| 18 | GK | Choi Ik-hyeong | 5 August 1973 (aged 17) | | (South Korea) Korea University |

== See also ==
- Korea Team
- North Korea national under-20 football team
- South Korea national under-20 football team
- North Korea–South Korea football rivalry
