= Park Kyu-seon =

South Korean footballer (born 1981)

Park Kyu-Seon 박규선
Personal information
- Full name: Park Kyu-Seon
- Date of birth: 24 September 1981 (age 45)
- Place of birth: Seoul, South Korea
- Height: 1.82 m (5 ft 11 1/2 in)
- Position: Midfielder

Senior career*
Years	Team	Apps	(Gls)
2000–2003	Ulsan Hyundai Horang-i	53	(0)
2004–2005	Jeonbuk Hyundai Motors	32	(2)
2006	Ulsan Hyundai Horang-i	19	(0)
2007–2009	Busan I'Park	15	(0)
2008–2009	→ Gwangju Sangmu (Military service)	25	(3)
Total		144	(5)

International career^{‡}
2003–2004	South Korea U-23	24	(0)
2004–2005	South Korea	8	(0)
Medal record
Representing South Korea
Men's football
Asian Games
Bronze medal – third place	2002 Busan	Team
- * Club domestic league appearances and goals as of 11 October 2009 ‡ National team caps and goals as of 5 October 2008

- Park Kyu-seon
- Hangul: 박규선
- Hanja: 朴圭善
- RR: Bak Gyuseon
- MR: Pak Kyusŏn

Park Kyu-Seon (born 24 September 1981) is a South Korean football player.

He was part of the South Korea football team in 2004 Summer Olympics, who finished second in Group A, making it through to the next round, before being defeated by silver medal winners Paraguay.

== Club career statistics ==
As of end of 2009 season

Club performance			League		Cup		League Cup		Continental		Total	
Season	Club	League	Apps	Goals	Apps	Goals	Apps	Goals	Apps	Goals	Apps	Goals
South Korea			League		KFA Cup		League Cup		Asia		Total	
2000	Ulsan Hyundai	K-League	5	0			6	1	-		11	1
2001	Ulsan Hyundai	K-League	25	0			1	0	-		26	0
2002	Ulsan Hyundai	K-League	15	0			10	0	-		25	0
2003	Ulsan Hyundai	K-League	8	0	3	0	-		-		11	0
2004	Jeonbuk Hyundai	K-League	17	1	2	0	0	0	?	?	19	1
2005	Jeonbuk Hyundai	K-League	15	1	4	0	6	0	-		25	1
2006	Ulsan Hyundai	K-League	19	0	0	0	9	0	?	?	28	0
2007	Busan I'Park	K-League	15	0	3	1	3	0	-		21	1
2008	Gwangju Sangmu	K-League	25	3	3	1	7	1	-		35	5
2009	Gwangju Sangmu	K-League	0	0	0	0	0	0	-		0	0
Total	Ulsan Hyundai		72	0	3	0	26	1			101	1
Total	Jeonbuk Hyundai		32	2	6	0	6	0			44	2
Total	Busan I'Park		15	0	3	1	3	0	-		21	1
Total	Gwangju Sangmu		25	3	3	1	7	1	-		35	5
Career total			144	5	15	2	42	2			201	9

== See also ==
- South Korea national football team
