= Lim Gi-han =

South Korean footballer

Lim Gi-Han
Personal information
- Full name: Lim Gi-Han
- Date of birth: 20 November 1973 (age 52)
- Place of birth: South Korea
- Height: 1.77 m (5 ft 9 1/2 in)
- Position: Midfielder

Youth career
- Daegu University

Senior career*
Years	Team	Apps	(Gls)
1994–1999	Yukong Elephants / Bucheon SK	11	(1)
Total		11	(0)

Managerial career
- 2008–: Daejeon Citizen U-18
- * Club domestic league appearances and goals as of 3 March 2011

- Lim Gi-han
- Hangul: 임기한
- Hanja: 林基漢
- RR: Im Gihan
- MR: Im Kihan

Lim Gi-Han (Korean: 임기한; born 20 October 1973) is a former South Korean footballer. He is currently head coach of Daejeon Citizen U-18 team.

Lim graduated from Daegu University. He was selected for the South Korean olympic team (U-23), but didn't participate in the olympic. Lim played for Bucheon SK until 1999, when he retired from playing football. In 2000, he was the coach for Bucheon FC, and from 2003 to 2007 has coach for Daejeon Citizen FC. In 2008, he was appointed as Daejeon Citizen U-18 head coach.

== Coaching ==
- 2000–2002: Bucheon FC (Coach)
- 2003–2007: Daejeon Citizen (Coach)
- 2008–: Daejeon Citizen U-18 (Head coach)
