= Kim Yong-hak =

South Korean footballer (born 2003)

Personal information
- Date of birth: 20 May 2003 (age 23)
- Place of birth: Gwangmyeong, South Korea
- Height: 1.72 m (5 ft 8 in)
- Position: Winger

Team information
- Current team: Pohang Steelers

Youth career
- 2011–2016: Gwangmyeong FC
- 2016–2018: Pohang Jecheol Middle School (Youth)
- 2019–2021: Pohang Jecheol High School (Youth)

Senior career*
| Years | Team | Apps | (Gls) |
| 2022–2023 | Pohang Steelers | 0 | (0) |
| 2022–2023 | → Portimonense (loan) | 0 | (0) |
| 2023– | Portimonense | 6 | (0) |
| 2026– | → Pohang Steelers (loan) | 9 | (0) |

International career^{‡}
| 2019 | South Korea U16 | 3 | (1) |
| 2019–2020 | South Korea U17 | 10 | (1) |
| 2022 | South Korea U19 | 5 | (1) |
| 2022–2023 | South Korea U20 | 14 | (4) |
| 2025– | South Korea U22 | 4 | (1) |
| 2026– | South Korea U23 | 2 | (0) |
- * Club domestic league appearances and goals as of 21:51, 25 July 2026 (UTC) ‡ National team caps and goals as of 23:58, 15 January 2026 (UTC)

Kim Yong-hak (Korean: 김용학; born 20 May 2003) is a South Korean professional footballer who plays as a winger for K League 1 club Pohang Steelers.

== Club career ==
Kim is a youth product of his local club Gwangmyeong FC, before moving to Pohang Steelers' youth academy in 2016.

On 22 January 2022, Kim joined Portuguese club Portimonense on loan. He made his senior debut as a late substitute in a 2–0 Taça da Liga loss to C.D. Nacional on 19 November 2022.

In January 2026, Kim returned to Pohang Steelers on a one-year loan deal.

== International career ==
Kim is a youth international for South Korea, having played up to the South Korea U20s.
