= Cho Hyun (footballer) =

South Korean footballer

Personal information
- Full name: Cho Hyun
- Date of birth: February 24, 1974 (age 52)
- Place of birth: South Korea
- Position: Midfielder

Team information
- Current team: Yewon Arts University

Youth career
- Dongguk University

Senior career*
Years	Team	Apps	(Gls)
1996–2000	Suwon Samsung Bluewings	57	(4)
2001	Ulsan Hyundai Horang-i	4	(0)
Total		61	(4)

International career
1993	South Korea U-20		
1994–1995	South Korea U-23	5	(2)

Managerial career
- 2002–present: Yewon Arts University
- * Club domestic league appearances and goals as of 10 June 2007

- Cho Hyun
- Hangul: 조현
- RR: Jo Hyeon
- MR: Cho Hyŏn

Cho Hyun (Korean: 조현; born February 24, 1974) is a football player from South Korea.

He was a member of the South Korea U-20 team in early 1990s and went on to play as a professional in the K-League.

== Club career statistics ==
Club performance			League		Cup		League Cup		Continental		Total	
Season	Club	League	Apps	Goals	Apps	Goals	Apps	Goals	Apps	Goals	Apps	Goals
South Korea			League		KFA Cup		League Cup		Asia		Total	
1996	Suwon Samsung Bluewings	K-League	12	0	?	?	4	1	-			
1997	Suwon Samsung Bluewings	K-League	7	1	?	?	5	0	?	?		
1998	Suwon Samsung Bluewings	K-League	2	0	?	?	5	0	?	?		
1999	Suwon Samsung Bluewings	K-League	17	2	?	?	2	0	?	?		
2000	Suwon Samsung Bluewings	K-League	0	0	?	?	3	0	?	?		
2001	Ulsan Hyundai Horang-i	K-League	2	0	?	?	2	0	?	?		
Total	South Korea		40	3			21	1				
Career total			40	3			21	1				
