= Cho In-chol =

North Korean footballer (born 1973)

Personal information
- Date of birth: 2 October 1973 (age 53)
- Height: 1.72 m (5 ft 8 in)
- Position: Defender

Senior career*
Years	Team	Apps	(Gls)
- Pyongyang

International career
1991	Korea U20	3	(1)
1990–1993	North Korea	17	(2)

Managerial career
- 2007–2010: April 25
- 2010–2011: North Korea
- ?: North Korea
- * Club domestic league appearances and goals

- Cho In-chol
- Hangul: 조인철
- RR: Jo Incheol
- MR: Cho Inch'ŏl

Cho In-chol (Korean: 조인철; born 2 October 1973) is a North Korean former footballer. He represented North Korea on at least seventeen occasions between 1990 and 1993, scoring twice. He also represented the unified Korean team at the 1991 FIFA World Youth Championship.

== Managerial career ==
Cho was named manager of the North Korea national football team in 2010.

== Career statistics ==
=== International ===
National team	Year	Apps	Goals
North Korea	1990	1	0
North Korea	1991	1	0
North Korea	1992	3	0
North Korea	1993	12	2
Total		17	2

=== International goals ===
Scores and results list North Korea's goal tally first, score column indicates score after each North Korea goal.

List of international goals scored by Kim
No.	Date	Venue	Opponent	Score	Result	Competition
1	11 April 1993	Khalifa International Stadium, Doha, Qatar	Singapore	1–1	2–1	1994 FIFA World Cup qualification
2	2 May 1993	National Stadium, Kallang, Singapore	Qatar	1–1	2–2	1994 FIFA World Cup qualification
