= Kim Seok-won (footballer) =

South Korean footballer

Personal information
- Full name: 7 November 1960 (age 65)
- Place of birth: South Korea
- Position: Forward

Senior career*
Years	Team	Apps	(Gls)
1983–1985	Yukong Elephants	28	(8)

International career
1984–1985	South Korea	8	(1)
- * Club domestic league appearances and goals

- Kim Seok-won
- Hangul: 김석원
- Hanja: 金錫垣
- RR: Gim Seokwon
- MR: Kim Sŏgwŏn

Kim Seok-won (born 7 November 1960) is a Korean football forward who played for South Korea in the 1984 Asian Cup. He also played for Yukong Elephants.

== International Records ==
Year	Apps	Goal
1984	3	0
1985	5	1
Total	8	1
