= 2016 AFC U-19 Championship squads =

Player names marked in bold went on to earn full international caps.

== Group A ==
=== Bahrain ===
Head coach:Abdulaziz Abdo Omar

=== Thailand ===
Head coach: Anurak Srikerd

No.	Pos.	Player	Date of birth (age)	Caps	Goals	Club
1	GK	Korraphat Nareechan	7 October 1997 (aged 19)			(Football Association of Thailand) Bangkok Glass
2	DF	Meechok Marhasaranukun	12 December 1997 (aged 18)			(Football Association of Thailand) Port
3	DF	Apisit Sorada	28 February 1997 (aged 19)			(Football Association of Thailand) Air Force Central
4	DF	Torsak Sa-ardeiem	30 June 1997 (aged 19)			(Football Association of Thailand) Bangkok Glass
5	DF	Kritsada Kaman	18 March 1999 (aged 17)			(Football Association of Thailand) Phan Thong
6	MF	Saharat Sontisawat	13 January 1998 (aged 18)			(Football Association of Thailand) Chonburi
7	MF	Wisarut Imura	18 October 1997 (aged 19)			(Football Association of Thailand) Bangkok United
8	MF	Suksan Mungpao	5 March 1997 (aged 19)			(Football Association of Thailand) Phrae United
9	FW	Warut Boonsuk	23 August 1997 (aged 19)			(Football Association of Thailand) Bangkok Glass
10	MF	Sansern Limwattana	31 July 1997 (aged 19)			(Football Association of Thailand) Bangkok United
11	MF	**Supachok Sarachat**	22 May 1998 (aged 18)			(Football Association of Thailand) Buriram United
12	MF	Kanarin Thawornsak	27 May 1997 (aged 19)			(Football Association of Thailand) Ratchaburi Mitr Phol
13	MF	**Anon Amornlerdsak**	6 November 1997 (aged 18)			(Football Association of Thailand) Buriram United
14	MF	Sorawit Panthong	20 February 1997 (aged 19)			(Football Association of Thailand) Muangthong United
15	FW	Sittichok Paso	28 January 1999 (aged 17)			(Football Association of Thailand) Chonburi
16	DF	Saringkan Promsupa	29 March 1997 (aged 19)			(Football Association of Thailand) Rayong
17	MF	Jakkit Wechpirom	26 January 1997 (aged 19)			(Football Association of Thailand) Chainat Hornbill
18	GK	Chakhon Philakhlang	8 March 1998 (aged 18)			(Football Association of Thailand) Chonburi
19	FW	Sirimongkhon Jitbanjong	8 August 1997 (aged 19)			(Football Association of Thailand) Simork
20	DF	Tirapon Thanachartkul	23 August 1998 (aged 18)			(Football Association of Thailand) Assumption United
21	FW	**Supachai Chaided**	1 December 1998 (aged 17)			(Football Association of Thailand) Super Power Samut Prakan
22	MF	Worachit Kanitsribampen (Captain)	24 August 1997 (aged 19)			(Football Association of Thailand) Chonburi
23	GK	Taro Prasarnkarn	27 November 1997 (aged 18)			(Football Association of Thailand) Phrae United

=== South Korea ===
Head coach:An Ik-soo

No.	Pos.	Player	Date of birth (age)	Caps	Club
1	GK	Song Bum-keun	15 October 1997 (age 28)		(South Korea) Korea University
21	GK	Lee Jun	14 July 1997 (age 28)		(South Korea) Yonsei University
23	GK	Moon Jung-in	16 March 1998 (age 28)		(South Korea) Ulsan Hyundai U-18
2	DF	Lee Jae-ik	21 May 1999 (age 26)		(South Korea) Boin High School
3	DF	Jeong Tae-wook	16 May 1997 (age 28)		(South Korea) Ajou University
4	DF	Lee You-hyeon	8 February 1997 (age 29)		(South Korea) Dankook University
6	DF	Lee Sang-min	1 January 1998 (age 28)		(South Korea) Soongsil University
12	DF	Choe Ik-jin	3 May 1997 (age 29)		(South Korea) Ajou University
15	DF	Lee Seung-mo	30 March 1998 (age 28)		(South Korea) Pohang Steelers U-18
20	DF	Woo Chan-yang	27 April 1997 (age 29)		(South Korea) Pohang Steelers
22	DF	Kang Yoon-sung	1 July 1997 (age 28)		(South Korea) Daejeon Citizen FC
5	MF	Park Han-bin	21 September 1997 (age 28)		(South Korea) Daegu FC
7	MF	Lee Dong-jun	1 February 1997 (age 29)		(South Korea) Soongsil University
8	MF	Han Chan-hee	17 March 1997 (age 29)		(South Korea) Jeonnam Dragons
11	MF	Kim Geon-ung	29 August 1997 (age 28)		(South Korea) Ulsan Hyundai
16	MF	Lim Min-hyeok	5 March 1997 (age 29)		(South Korea) FC Seoul
17	MF	Kim Si-woo	26 June 1997 (age 28)		(South Korea) Gwangju FC
18	MF	Kim Jeong-hawn	4 January 1997 (age 29)		(South Korea) FC Seoul
19	MF	Eom Won-sang	6 January 1999 (age 27)		(South Korea) Kumho High School
9	FW	Lee Gi-woon	15 February 1997 (age 29)		(South Korea) Dankook University
10	FW	Cho Young-wook	5 February 1999 (age 27)		(South Korea) Eonnam High School
13	FW	Kang Ji-hoon	6 January 1997 (age 29)		(South Korea) Yongin University
14	FW	Paik Seung-ho	17 March 1997 (age 29)		(Spain) FC Barcelona B

=== Saudi Arabia ===
Head coach: Saad Al-Shehri

No.	Pos.	Player	Date of birth (age)	Club
1	GK	Amin Al-Bukhari	2 May 1997 (aged 19)	(Saudi Arabian Football Federation) Al-Ittihad
2	DF	Abdullah Hassoun	19 March 1997 (aged 19)	(Saudi Arabian Football Federation) Al-Ahli
3	MF	Nasser Al-Otaibi		(Saudi Arabian Football Federation) Al-Ahli
4	DF	Awn Al-Saluli	2 September 1998 (aged 18)	(Saudi Arabian Football Federation) Al-Ittihad
5	DF	Abdulelah Al-Amri		(Saudi Arabian Football Federation) Al-Nassr
6	MF	**Sami Al-Najei**	7 February 1997 (aged 19)	(Saudi Arabian Football Federation) Al-Nassr
7	FW	Rakan Al-Shamlan	14 July 1998 (aged 18)	(Saudi Arabian Football Federation) Al-Nassr
8	DF	Anas Zabani	7 April 1997 (aged 19)	(Saudi Arabian Football Federation) Al-Hilal
9	MF	Ammar Al-Najar	24 February 1997 (aged 19)	(Saudi Arabian Football Federation) Al-Ittihad
10	MF	**Ayman Al-Khulaif**	22 May 1997 (aged 19)	(Saudi Arabian Football Federation) Al-Ahli
11	FW	Abdulrahman Al-Yami	19 June 1997 (aged 19)	(Saudi Arabian Football Federation) Al-Hilal
12	DF	Mohammed Al-Zubaidi	25 August 1997 (aged 19)	(Saudi Arabian Football Federation) Al-Ettifaq
13	DF	Khalid Al-Dubaysh		(Saudi Arabian Football Federation) Al-Nassr
14	FW	Ali Al-Asmari	12 January 1997 (aged 19)	(Saudi Arabian Football Federation) Al-Ahli
15	MF	Naif Kariri		(Saudi Arabian Football Federation) Al-Hilal
16	MF	**Abdulrahman Al-Dossari**	25 September 1997 (aged 19)	(Saudi Arabian Football Federation) Al-Nassr
17	MF	Abdulrahman Ghareeb	31 March 1997 (aged 19)	(Saudi Arabian Football Federation) Al-Ahli
18	MF	Nasser Al-Dawsari	19 December 1998 (aged 17)	(Saudi Arabian Football Federation) Al-Hilal
19	DF	Fahad Al-Harbi	25 February 1997 (aged 19)	(Saudi Arabian Football Federation) Al-Ahli
20	FW	Mansour Al-Muwallad		(Saudi Arabian Football Federation) Al-Ahli
21	GK	Mohammed Al-Yami	14 August 1997 (aged 19)	(Saudi Arabian Football Federation) Al-Ahli
22	GK	Zaid Al-Bawardi	26 January 1997 (aged 19)	(Saudi Arabian Football Federation) Al-Nassr
23	MF	Abdullah Majrashi	24 August 1997 (aged 19)	(Saudi Arabian Football Federation) Al-Ahli

== Group B ==
=== North Korea ===
Head coach:Ri song ho

=== United Arab Emirates ===
Head Coach:Jakub Dovalil

=== Iraq ===
Head coach: Abbas Attiya

No.	Pos.	Player	Date of birth (age)	Club
1	GK	Mohammed Abbas Ali	16 September 1998 (aged 18)	(Iraq Football Association) Al-Shorta
2	DF	Kareem Deli Najim	16 April 1998 (aged 18)	(Iraq Football Association) Naft Al-Wasat
3	DF	Mustafa Mohammed Al-Ezairej	15 January 1997 (aged 19)	(Iraq Football Association) Al-Quwa Al-Jawiya
4	DF	Yassir Ammar Sami	31 January 1997 (aged 19)	(Iraq Football Association) Al-Minaa
5	DF	Ahmed Abdul-Ridha	2 April 1997 (aged 19)	(Iraq Football Association) Al-Quwa Al-Jawiya
6	DF	Karrar Falih	3 December 1998 (aged 17)	(Iraq Football Association)
7	MF	Ameer Sabah Khudhair	3 June 1998 (aged 18)	(Iraq Football Association) Naft Al-Wasat
8	MF	Ahmed Jalal	17 March 1998 (aged 18)	(Iraq Football Association) Naft Al-Janoob
9	FW	Sajad Hussein	9 September 1998 (aged 18)	(Iraq Football Association) Amanat Baghdad
10	FW	Alaa Abbas	27 July 1997 (aged 19)	(Iraq Football Association) Naft Al-Wasat
11	FW	Mustafa Ali Neamah	20 March 1998 (aged 18)	(Iraq Football Association) Al-Naft
12	GK	Hasanain Mohammed	8 September 1997 (aged 19)	(Iraq Football Association)
13	MF	Jasim Mohammed Oglah	23 January 1998 (aged 18)	(Iraq Football Association)
14	FW	Mazin Fayyadh	2 April 1997 (aged 19)	(Iraq Football Association) Al-Naft
15	DF	Ayad Kareem	2 April 1997 (aged 19)	(Iraq Football Association) Al-Kahraba
16	MF	Safaa Hadi	14 October 1998 (aged 17)	(Iraq Football Association) Al-Minaa
17	MF	Amjad Attwan	12 March 1997 (aged 19)	(Iraq Football Association) Naft Al-Wasat
18	DF	Ali Hussein Habeeb	27 May 1997 (aged 19)	(Iraq Football Association)
19	DF	Saif Hatem Abbood	25 October 1998 (aged 17)	(Iraq Football Association) Al-Quwa Al-Jawiya
20	DF	Walid Kareem	6 October 1997 (aged 19)	(Iraq Football Association) Al-Naft
21	MF	Murtagi Ahmed Atiyah		(Iraq Football Association)
22	GK	Ali Kadhim Hadi	24 October 1997 (aged 18)	(Iraq Football Association) Naft Al-Wasat
23	DF	Mohammed Kareem	1 September 1997 (aged 19)	(Iraq Football Association)

=== Vietnam ===
Head coach: (Vietnam) Hoàng Anh Tuấn

No.	Pos.	Player	Date of birth (age)	Caps	Goals	Club
1	GK	Bùi Tiến Dũng	February 28, 1997 (aged 19)			(Vietnam Football Federation) FLC Thanh Hóa F.C.
2	DF	Mạc Đức Việt Anh	January 16, 1997 (aged 19)			(Vietnam Football Federation) PVF
3	DF	Huỳnh Tấn Sinh	April 6, 1998 (aged 18)			(Vietnam Football Federation) QNK Quảng Nam F.C.
4	DF	Nguyễn Hữu Lâm	August 16, 1998 (aged 18)			(Vietnam Football Federation) FLC Thanh Hóa F.C.
5	DF	Đoàn Văn Hậu	April 19, 1999 (aged 17)			(Vietnam Football Federation) Hà Nội F.C
6	MF	Bùi Tiến Dụng	November 23, 1998 (aged 17)			(Vietnam Football Federation) PVF
7	DF	Nguyễn Trọng Đại	April 7, 1997 (aged 19)			(Vietnam Football Federation) Viettel F.C.
8	MF	Tống Anh Tỷ	January 24, 1997 (aged 19)			(Vietnam Football Federation) Becamex Bình Dương F.C.
9	FW	Hà Đức Chinh	September 22, 1997 (aged 19)			(Vietnam Football Federation) PVF
10	MF	Triệu Việt Hưng	January 19, 1997 (aged 19)			(Vietnam Football Federation) Hoàng Anh Gia Lai F.C.
11	MF	Hồ Minh Dĩ	February 17, 1998 (aged 18)			(Vietnam Football Federation) PVF
12	MF	Lương Hoàng Nam	March 2, 1997 (aged 19)			(Vietnam Football Federation) Hoàng Anh Gia Lai F.C.
14	MF	Trương Văn Thái Quý	August 22, 1997 (aged 19)			(Vietnam Football Federation) PVF
15	FW	Nguyễn Tiến Linh	October 20, 1997 (aged 18)			(Vietnam Football Federation) Becamex Bình Dương F.C.
16	MF	Phan Thanh Hậu	January 12, 1997 (aged 19)			(Vietnam Football Federation) Hoàng Anh Gia Lai F.C.
17	FW	Trần Thành	February 2, 1997 (aged 19)			(Vietnam Football Federation) Huế F.C.
18	FW	Dương Văn Hào	February 15, 1997 (aged 19)			(Vietnam Football Federation) Viettel F.C.
19	MF	Trương Tiến Anh	April 25, 1999 (aged 17)			(Vietnam Football Federation) Viettel F.C.
20	GK	Nguyễn Bá Minh Hiếu	May 23, 1997 (aged 19)			(Vietnam Football Federation) Hà Nội F.C
21	GK	Đỗ Sỹ Huy	April 16, 1998 (aged 18)			(Vietnam Football Federation) Công An Nhân Dân F.C.
22	DF	Hồ Tấn Tài	November 6, 1997 (aged 18)			(Vietnam Football Federation) Bình Định F.C.
23	MF	Nguyễn Quang Hải	April 12, 1997 (aged 19)			(Vietnam Football Federation) Hà Nội F.C.

== Group C ==
=== Qatar ===
Head coach:Oscar Moreno

=== Japan ===
Head coach:Atsushi Uchiyama

No.	Pos.	Player	Date of birth (age)	Club
1	GK	Ryosuke Kojima	30 January 1997 (aged 19)	(Japan Football Association) Waseda University
2	DF	So Fujitani	28 October 1997 (aged 18)	(Japan Football Association) Vissel Kobe
3	DF	Yuta Nakayama	30 January 1997 (aged 19)	(Japan Football Association) Kashiwa Reysol
4	DF	Koki Machida	25 August 1997 (aged 19)	(Japan Football Association) Kashima Antlers
5	DF	Takehiro Tomiyasu	5 November 1998 (aged 17)	(Japan Football Association) Avispa Fukuoka
6	DF	Ryo Hatsuse	10 July 1997 (aged 19)	(Japan Football Association) Gamba Osaka
7	MF	Yuta Kamiya	24 April 1997 (aged 19)	(Japan Football Association) Shonan Bellmare
8	MF	Koji Miyoshi	26 March 1997 (aged 19)	(Japan Football Association) Kawasaki Frontale
9	FW	Koki Ogawa	30 January 1997 (aged 19)	(Japan Football Association) Jubilo Iwata
10	MF	Daisuke Sakai	18 January 1997 (aged 19)	(Japan Football Association) Oita Trinita
11	MF	Yoichi Naganuma	14 April 1997 (aged 19)	(Japan Football Association) Sanfrecce Hiroshima
12	GK	Riku Hirosue	6 July 1998 (aged 18)	(Japan Football Association) Aomori Yamada High School
13	FW	Takeru Kishimoto	16 July 1997 (aged 19)	(Japan Football Association) Cerezo Osaka
14	FW	Shunta Nakamura	10 May 1999 (aged 17)	(Japan Football Association) Kashiwa Reysol U18
15	MF	Ritsu Doan	16 June 1998 (aged 18)	(Japan Football Association) Gamba Osaka
16	DF	Tomoki Iwata	7 April 1997 (aged 19)	(Japan Football Association) Oita Trinita
17	MF	Mizuki Ichimaru	8 May 1997 (aged 19)	(Japan Football Association) Gamba Osaka
18	MF	Keita Endo	22 November 1997 (aged 18)	(Japan Football Association) Cerezo Osaka
19	DF	Kakeru Funaki	13 April 1998 (aged 18)	(Japan Football Association) Cerezo Osaka
20	FW	Yuto Iwasaki	11 June 1998 (aged 18)	(Japan Football Association) Kyoto Sanga
21	MF	Teruki Hara	30 July 1998 (aged 18)	(Japan Football Association) Albirex Niigata
22	DF	Ko Itakura	27 January 1997 (aged 19)	(Japan Football Association) Kawasaki Frontale
23	GK	Tomoya Wakahara	December 28, 1999 (aged 16)	(Japan Football Association) Kyoto Sanga U-18

=== Yemen ===
Head coach:Mohammed AL-Nufiay

=== Iran ===
Head coach: Amir Hossein Peiravani

No.	Pos.	Player	Date of birth (age)	Club
1	GK	Nima Mirzazad		(Football Federation Islamic Republic of Iran) Malavan
2	DF	Amir Hossein Taheri		(Football Federation Islamic Republic of Iran)
3	DF	Ali Shojaei		(Football Federation Islamic Republic of Iran) Saipa
4	DF	Aref Gholami		(Football Federation Islamic Republic of Iran)
5	DF	Nima Taheri		(Football Federation Islamic Republic of Iran)
6	MF	Mohammad Soltani Mehr		(Football Federation Islamic Republic of Iran) Saipa
7	MF	Reza Shekari		(Football Federation Islamic Republic of Iran) Zob Ahan
8	MF	Mohammad Gholamreza		(Football Federation Islamic Republic of Iran)
9	FW	Mehdi Mehdikhani		(Football Federation Islamic Republic of Iran)
10	FW	Reza Karamolachaab		(Football Federation Islamic Republic of Iran) Persepolis
11	MF	Nima Mokhtari		(Football Federation Islamic Republic of Iran) Gostaresh Foolad
12	GK	Shahab Adeli		(Football Federation Islamic Republic of Iran)
13	MF	Omid Noorafkan		(Football Federation Islamic Republic of Iran) Esteghlal
14	MF	Mojtaba Najjarian		(Football Federation Islamic Republic of Iran) Foolad
15	DF	Aref Aghasi		(Football Federation Islamic Republic of Iran)
16	MF	Ali Taheran		(Football Federation Islamic Republic of Iran)
17	MF	Hossein Saki		(Football Federation Islamic Republic of Iran) Sanat Naft Abadan
18	MF	Mohammad Aghajanpour		(Football Federation Islamic Republic of Iran)
19	FW	Reza Jafari		(Football Federation Islamic Republic of Iran)
20	MF	Shahin Abbasian		(Football Federation Islamic Republic of Iran)
21	DF	Sina Khadempour		(Football Federation Islamic Republic of Iran)
22	GK	Mohammad Amin Bahrami		(Football Federation Islamic Republic of Iran)
23	DF	Abolfazl Razzaghpour		(Football Federation Islamic Republic of Iran)

== Group D ==
=== Uzbekistan ===
Head coach: Jasur Abduraimov

No.	Pos.	Player	Date of birth (age)	Caps	Goals	Club
1	GK	Umidjan Hamroyev	7 October 1997 (aged 19)			(Uzbekistan Football Association) Pakhtakor Tashkent
2	DF	Azizbek Suyunov	12 December 1997 (aged 18)			(Uzbekistan Football Association) Olmaliq
3	MF	Hajiakbar Alijanov	28 February 1997 (aged 19)			(Uzbekistan Football Association) Pakhtakor Tashkent
4	DF	Islamjan Qabilov	30 June 1997 (aged 19)			(Uzbekistan Football Association) Metallurg
5	DF	Khoshnoudbek Avilov	18 March 1999 (aged 17)			(Uzbekistan Football Association) Pakhtakor Tashkent
6	MF	Azizjon Ganiev	22 February 1998 (aged 18)			(Uzbekistan Football Association) Nasaf
7	MF	Sanjar Qadirqulov	18 October 1997 (aged 19)			(Uzbekistan Football Association) Bunyodkor
8	MF	Saidjamal Davlatjanov	5 March 1997 (aged 19)			(Uzbekistan Football Association) Dinamo Samarqand
9	FW	Jasurbek Yakhshiboev	24 June 1997 (aged 19)			(Uzbekistan Football Association) Pakhtakor Tashkent
10	MF	Sohrab Nurullayev	31 July 1997 (aged 19)			(Uzbekistan Football Association) ROZK
11	FW	Babur Abdukhaliqov	22 May 1998 (aged 18)			(Uzbekistan Football Association) Nasaf
12	GK	Umidjan Ergashev	27 May 1997 (aged 19)			(Uzbekistan Football Association) Nasaf
13	FW	Javahir Esanqulov	6 November 1997 (aged 18)			(Uzbekistan Football Association) Metallurg
14	MF	Sharaf Muhiddinov	20 February 1997 (aged 19)			(Uzbekistan Football Association) Nasaf
15	DF	Aybek Rostamov	28 January 1999 (aged 17)			(Uzbekistan Football Association) Kokand 1912
16	MF	Jamshed Yusupov	29 March 1997 (aged 19)			(Uzbekistan Football Association) Pakhtakor Tashkent
18	MF	Shahrukh Mahmudhajiyev	8 March 1998 (aged 18)			(Uzbekistan Football Association) Pakhtakor Tashkent
19	MF	Dastan Ibrahimov	8 August 1997 (aged 19)			(Uzbekistan Football Association) Dinamo Samarqand
20	DF	Husniddin Ghafourov	23 August 1998 (aged 18)			(Uzbekistan Football Association) Neftchi
21	GK	Shahrukhjan Rahimov	1 December 1998 (aged 17)			(Uzbekistan Football Association) Pakhtakor Tashkent
22	FW	Bekzad Ghanijanov	24 August 1997 (aged 19)			(Uzbekistan Football Association) Qizilqum Zarafshon
23	MF	Nourillah Tokhtasinov	27 November 1997 (aged 18)			(Uzbekistan Football Association) Bunyodkor Tashkent

=== China ===
Head coach: Li Ming

No.	Pos.	Player	Date of birth (age)	Caps	Goals	Club
1	GK	Zhang Yan	30 March 1997 (age 29)	0	0	(Chinese Football Association) Beijing Sinobo Guoan F.C.
12	GK	Li Zheng	18 March 1997 (age 29)	0	0	(Portuguese Football Federation) Gondomar S.C.
22	GK	Shi Xiaodong	26 February 1997 (age 29)	0	0	(Chinese Football Association) Shanghai SIPG F.C.
2	DF	Wei Lai	2 January 1997 (age 29)	0	0	(Chinese Football Association) Shanghai SIPG F.C.
3	DF	**Wei Zhen**	12 February 1997 (age 29)	0	0	(Chinese Football Association) Shanghai SIPG F.C.
5	DF	Huang Chuang	28 October 1997 (age 28)	0	0	(Portuguese Football Federation) Gondomar S.C.
15	DF	Yao Daogang	1 September 1997 (age 28)	0	0	(Portuguese Football Federation) Gondomar S.C.
16	DF	Feng Boxuan	18 March 1997 (age 29)	0	0	(Portuguese Football Federation) S.C.U. Torreense
20	DF	**Huang Zhengyu**	24 January 1997 (age 29)	0	0	(Chinese Football Association) Guangzhou R&F F.C.
21	DF	Liu Boyang	18 January 1997 (age 29)	0	0	(Chinese Football Association) Beijing Renhe
6	MF	Cong Zhen	9 February 1997 (age 29)	0	0	(Chinese Football Association) Beijing Renhe
7	MF	Liu Yue	14 September 1997 (age 28)	0	0	(Chinese Football Association) Zhejiang Yiteng
8	MF	Deng Yubiao	8 June 1997 (age 28)	0	0	(Portuguese Football Federation) S.C.U. Torreense
10	MF	Zhang Yuan	28 January 1997 (age 29)	0	0	(Portuguese Football Federation) GS Loures
11	MF	**Lin Liangming**	4 June 1997 (age 28)	0	0	(Royal Spanish Football Federation) Real Madrid CF
13	MF	Huang Cong	6 January 1997 (age 29)	0	0	(Slovak Football Association) AS Trenčín
14	MF	Gao Huaze	20 October 1997 (age 28)	0	0	(Chinese Football Association) Hangzhou Greentown
17	MF	**Yang Liyu**	13 February 1997 (age 29)	0	0	(Portuguese Football Federation) Gondomar S.C.
18	MF	Hu Jinghang	23 March 1997 (age 29)	0	0	(Chinese Football Association) Shanghai SIPG F.C.
19	MF	**Cao Yongjing**	15 February 1997 (age 29)	0	0	(Chinese Football Association) Beijing Renhe
4	FW	Guo Tianyu	5 March 1999 (age 27)	0	0	(Chinese Football Association) Shandong Luneng
23	FW	Ning Weichen	18 March 1997 (age 29)	0	0	(Portuguese Football Federation) C.D. Cova da Piedade

=== Australia ===
Head coach:Ufuk Talay

No.	Pos.	Player	Date of birth (age)	Caps	Goals	Club
1	GK	Daniel Margush	28 November 1997 (age 28)	4	0	(Football Australia) Adelaide United
12	GK	Tom Glover	24 December 1997 (age 28)	9	0	(The Football Association) Tottenham Hotspur
18	GK	Jasko Keranovic	2 March 1998 (age 28)	2	0	(The Football Association) West Bromwich Albion
	GK	Jordan Holmes	8 May 1997 (age 29)	5	0	(The Football Association) Bournemouth
2	DF	William Mutch	27 February 1998 (age 28)	11	0	(Football Australia) Sydney FC
4	DF	**Thomas Deng** (Captain)	20 March 1997 (age 29)	10	0	(Royal Dutch Football Association) Jong PSV
5	DF	Jackson Bandiera	16 April 1998 (age 28)	7	0	(Football Australia) Western Sydney Wanderers
11	DF	Connor O'Toole	1 January 1997 (age 29)	7	0	(Football Australia) Brisbane Roar
15	DF	Patrick Flottmann	19 April 1997 (age 29)	3	0	(Football Australia) Sydney FC
19	DF	George Timotheou	29 July 1997 (age 28)	7	0	(Football Australia) Sydney FC
6	MF	Liam Rose	7 April 1997 (age 29)	15	0	(Football Australia) Central Coast Mariners
10	MF	Anthony Kalik	5 November 1997 (age 28)	4	0	(Croatian Football Federation) Hajduk Split
17	MF	Tariq Maia	11 June 1997 (age 28)	6	1	(Football Australia) Western Sydney Wanderers
20	MF	Josh Hope	7 January 1998 (age 28)	5	0	(Football Australia) Melbourne Victory
21	MF	Jake Brimmer	3 April 1998 (age 28)	2	0	(The Football Association) Liverpool
22	MF	**Keanu Baccus**	7 June 1998 (age 27)	5	1	(Football Australia) Western Sydney Wanderers
23	MF	Liam Youlley	20 February 1997 (age 29)	16	1	(Football Australia) Western Sydney Wanderers
	MF	George Mells	23 May 1997 (age 28)	3	1	(Football Australia) Adelaide United
3	FW	Lachlan Scott	15 April 1997 (age 29)	7	3	(Football Australia) Western Sydney Wanderers
7	FW	Reno Piscopo	27 May 1998 (age 27)	1	0	(Italian Football Federation) Internazionale
8	FW	Mario Shabow	5 May 1998 (age 28)	13	5	(Football Australia) Western Sydney Wanderers
9	FW	Jayden Prasad	5 February 1997 (age 29)	5	1	(Football Australia) Brisbane Roar
13	FW	George Blackwood	4 June 1997 (age 28)	16	7	(Football Australia) Sydney FC
14	FW	Joseph Champness	27 April 1997 (age 29)	7	2	(Football Australia) Brisbane Roar
16	FW	Steve Kuzmanovski	4 January 1997 (age 29)	15	6	(Football Australia) Melbourne City

=== Tajikistan ===
Head coach:Vitaliy Levchenko

No.	Pos.	Player	Date of birth (age)	Club
1	GK	Shahrom Ismoilov	16 October 1998 (aged 17)	(Tajikistan Football Federation) Vakhsh Qurghonteppa
2	DF	Khuseyn Nurmatov	18 September 2000 (aged 16)	(Tajikistan Football Federation) Barkchi
3	DF	Tabrezi Davlatmir	6 June 1998 (aged 18)	(Tajikistan Football Federation) FC Istiklol
4	FW	Munir Davlatbekov	26 December 1998 (aged 17)	(Tajikistan Football Federation)
5	FW	Dorobjon Ergashev	14 December 1997 (aged 18)	(Tajikistan Football Federation)
6	DF	Khotam Alisheri		(Tajikistan Football Federation)
7	MF	Karomatullo Saidov	12 October 1999 (aged 17)	(Tajikistan Football Federation) Barkchi
8	MF	Hojiboy Ziyoev	3 April 1998 (aged 18)	(Tajikistan Football Federation) FK Khujand
9	FW	Muhammadjoni Hasan	15 October 1998 (aged 17)	(Tajikistan Football Federation) Khosilot Farkhor
10	FW	Mukhsinzhon Parpiev	9 April 1997 (aged 19)	(Tajikistan Football Federation) Barkchi
11	FW	Nuriddin Hamroqulov	19 April 1999 (aged 17)	(Tajikistan Football Federation) Barkchi
12	FW	Amirdzhon Safarov	27 May 1997 (aged 19)	(Tajikistan Football Federation)
13	FW	Rustam Tolibov	24 March 1998 (aged 18)	(Tajikistan Football Federation)
14	DF	Vahdat Hanonov	25 July 2000 (aged 16)	(Tajikistan Football Federation) CSKA Pamir Dushanbe
15	MF	Zoir Juraboev	16 September 1998 (aged 18)	(Tajikistan Football Federation) Barkchi
16	GK	Fathullo Boboev	9 October 1997 (aged 19)	(Tajikistan Football Federation) Khosilot Farkhor
17	MF	Panshanbe Ehsoni	12 May 1999 (aged 17)	(Tajikistan Football Federation) Vakhsh Qurghonteppa
18	MF	Daler Yodgorov	1 May 2000 (aged 16)	(Tajikistan Football Federation) Barkchi
19	DF	Azimchon Rakhmonov	7 October 1998 (aged 18)	(Tajikistan Football Federation)
20	DF	Ziyududdin Fuzaylov	7 March 2000 (aged 16)	(Tajikistan Football Federation) FC Istiklol
21	FW	Sheriddin Boboev	21 April 1999 (aged 17)	(Tajikistan Football Federation) FC Istiklol
22	MF	Otabek Karimov		(Tajikistan Football Federation)
23	GK	Behruz Khayriev	1 May 1998 (aged 18)	(Tajikistan Football Federation) Vakhsh Qurghonteppa
