= 2016 AFC U-19 Championship qualification =

Tournament details
- Host countries: Bangladesh (Group A); Saudi Arabia (Group B); Palestine (Group C); Qatar (Group D); Iran (Group E); Tajikistan (Group F); Myanmar (Group G); Thailand (Group H); China (Group I); Laos (Group J)
- Dates: 28 September – 6 October 2015
- Teams: 43 (from 1 confederation)

Tournament statistics
- Matches played: 68
- Goals scored: 282 (4.15 per match)
- Attendance: 102,946 (1,514 per match)
- Top scorer: (United Arab Emirates) Majid Lafi (6 goals)

The 2016 AFC U-19 Championship qualification decided the participating teams of the 2016 AFC U-19 Championship. The tournament is the 39th edition of the AFC U-19 Championship, the biennial international youth football championship organised by the Asian Football Confederation (AFC) for the men's under-19 national teams of Asia.

A total of 16 teams qualified to play in the final tournament, including Bahrain who qualified automatically as hosts but also competed in the qualifying stage.

Same as previous editions, the tournament acts as the AFC qualifiers for the FIFA U-20 World Cup. The top four teams of the final tournament will qualify for the 2017 FIFA U-20 World Cup in South Korea as the AFC representatives, besides South Korea who qualified automatically as hosts. If South Korea are among the top four teams, the fifth-placed team (i.e., the losing quarter-finalist with the best record in the tournament) will also qualify for the 2017 FIFA U-20 World Cup.

== Draw ==
The draw for the qualifiers was held on 5 June 2015 at the AFC House in Kuala Lumpur. A total of 43 teams entered the qualifying stage and were drawn into ten groups.

- West Zone, with 25 entrants from Central Asia, South Asia and West Asia, had one group of five teams and five groups of four teams.
- East Zone, with 18 entrants from ASEAN and East Asia, had two groups of five teams and two groups of four teams.

The teams were seeded according to their performance in the previous season in 2014.

	Pot 1	Pot 2	Pot 3	Pot 4	Pot 5
West Zone (Groups A–F)	Iran Iraq Qatar United Arab Emirates Uzbekistan Yemen	Bahrain Bangladesh Kuwait Oman Palestine Saudi Arabia	India Jordan Lebanon Maldives Pakistan (W) Turkmenistan	Afghanistan Kyrgyzstan Nepal Sri Lanka Syria Tajikistan	Bhutan
East Zone (Groups G–J)	Japan Myanmar North Korea Thailand	Australia China South Korea Vietnam	Hong Kong Malaysia Philippines Singapore	Brunei Chinese Taipei Laos Macau	Northern Mariana^{1} Timor-Leste

Did not enter
West Zone	None
East Zone	Cambodia; Guam; Indonesia (suspended by FIFA); Mongolia

Note:
^{1} Non-FIFA member, ineligible for U-20 World Cup.

== Player eligibility ==
Players born on or after 1 January 1997 are eligible to compete in the tournament.

== Format ==
In each group, teams play each other once at a centralised venue. The ten group winners and the five best runners-up from all groups qualify for the final tournament. If Bahrain are one of the group winners or best runners-up, the sixth-best runner-up also qualifies for the final tournament.

=== Tiebreakers ===
The teams were ranked according to points (3 points for a win, 1 point for a draw, 0 points for a loss). If tied on points, tiebreakers would be applied in the following order:

1. Greater number of points obtained in the group matches between the teams concerned;
2. Goal difference resulting from the group matches between the teams concerned;
3. Greater number of goals scored in the group matches between the teams concerned;
4. If, after applying criteria 1 to 3, teams still have an equal ranking, criteria 1 to 3 are reapplied exclusively to the matches between the teams in question to determine their final rankings. If this procedure does not lead to a decision, criteria 5 to 9 apply;
5. Goal difference in all the group matches;
6. Greater number of goals scored in all the group matches;
7. Penalty shoot-out if only two teams are involved and they are both on the field of play;
8. Fewer score calculated according to the number of yellow and red cards received in the group matches (1 point for a single yellow card, 3 points for a red card as a consequence of two yellow cards, 3 points for a direct red card, 4 points for a yellow card followed by a direct red card);
9. Drawing of lots.

== Groups ==
The matches are played between 28 September – 6 October 2015 for Groups G and H (five-team groups); 2–6 October 2015 for all other groups (four-team groups).

Key to colours in group tables
Group winners and best five runners-up, and Bahrain as hosts, qualify for the finals.
Withdrawn

=== Group A ===
- All matches were held in Bangladesh.
- Times listed are UTC+6.

Pos	Team	Pld	W	D	L	GF	GA	GD	Pts	Qualification
1	Uzbekistan	3	3	0	0	14	0	+14	9	Final tournament
2	Bangladesh (H)	3	1	1	1	3	5	−2	4	
3	Sri Lanka	3	1	0	2	2	5	−3	3	
4	Bhutan	3	0	1	2	1	10	−9	1	
5	Pakistan	0	0	0	0	0	0	0	0	Withdrew

Source: AFC
Rules for classification: Qualification tiebreakers
(H) Hosts
2 October 2015
15:00

Uzbekistan	7–0	Bhutan
Gofurov 42'; Mukhiddinov 45' (pen.); Kodirkulov 55'; Abdixolikov 70', 80'; Davlatjonov 88'; Tukhtasinov 90+3'	Report

Bangabandhu National Stadium, Dhaka
Attendance: 300
Referee: Marai Al-Awaji (Saudi Arabia)
2 October 2015
18:00

Bangladesh	2–0	Sri Lanka
Rabby 67'; Jony 83' (pen.)	Report

Bangabandhu National Stadium, Dhaka
Attendance: 1,500
Referee: Abdullah Al Hilali (Oman)

4 October 2015
15:00

Sri Lanka	0–3	Uzbekistan
	Report	Tukhtasinov 7'; Ibragimov 21'; Kodirkulov 30'

Bangabandhu National Stadium, Dhaka
Attendance: 100
Referee: Marai Al-Awaji (Saudi Arabia)
4 October 2015
18:00

Bhutan	1–1	Bangladesh
Tobgay 6'	Report	Jony 77'

Bangabandhu National Stadium, Dhaka
Attendance: 2,200
Referee: Timur Faizullin (Kyrgyzstan)

6 October 2015
15:00

Sri Lanka	2–0	Bhutan
Akram 13', 85'	Report

Bangabandhu National Stadium, Dhaka
Attendance: 100
Referee: Timur Faizullin (Kyrgyzstan)
6 October 2015
18:00

Uzbekistan	4–0	Bangladesh
Ibragimov 2', 62'; Abdixolikov 79'; Nurulloev 90+2'	Report

Bangabandhu National Stadium, Dhaka
Attendance: 1,300
Referee: Abdullah Al Hilali (Oman)

=== Group B ===
- All matches were held in Saudi Arabia.
- Times listed are UTC+3.

Pos	Team	Pld	W	D	L	GF	GA	GD	Pts	Qualification
1	Saudi Arabia (H)	3	3	0	0	11	1	+10	9	Final tournament
2	Yemen	3	2	0	1	2	2	0	6	Final tournament
3	Turkmenistan	3	1	0	2	4	7	−3	3	
4	Syria	3	0	0	3	2	9	−7	0	

Source: AFC
Rules for classification: Qualification tiebreakers
(H) Hosts
2 October 2015
15:05

Yemen	1–0	Syria
Ahmed 77'	Report

Prince Abdullah bin Jalawi Stadium, Al-Hasa
Attendance: 200
Referee: Ahmed Al-Kaf (Oman)
2 October 2015
18:05

Saudi Arabia	5–0	Turkmenistan
Al-Najar 15'; Al-Khulaif 63'; Al-Kahtani 70'; Al-Yami 82', 90+3'	Report

Prince Abdullah bin Jalawi Stadium, Al-Hasa
Attendance: 100
Referee: Mohamed Al Zarouni (United Arab Emirates)

4 October 2015
15:05

Turkmenistan	0–1	Yemen
	Report	Al-Huthaifi 88'

Prince Abdullah bin Jalawi Stadium, Al-Hasa
Attendance: 150
Referee: Ahmed Al-Kaf (Oman)
4 October 2015
18:05

Syria	1–4	Saudi Arabia
Arafa 88'	Report	Al-Harbi 16'; Al-Khulaif 37'; Al-Yami 41' (pen.); Al-Bassas 86' (pen.)

Prince Abdullah bin Jalawi Stadium, Al-Hasa
Attendance: 200
Referee: Mohanad Qasim Eesee Sarray (Iraq)

6 October 2015
15:05

Turkmenistan	4–1	Syria
Titow 20', 26'; Gurbangulyyev 75'; Akmämmedow 80'	Report	Dali 74' (pen.)

Prince Abdullah bin Jalawi Stadium, Al-Hasa
Attendance: 80
Referee: Mohanad Qasim Eesee Sarray (Iraq)
6 October 2015
18:05

Yemen	0–2	Saudi Arabia
	Report	Al-Najei 61'; Al-Yami 74'

Prince Abdullah bin Jalawi Stadium, Al-Hasa
Attendance: 1,000
Referee: Mohamed Al Zarouni (United Arab Emirates)

=== Group C ===
- All matches were held in Palestine.
- Times listed are UTC+3.

Pos	Team	Pld	W	D	L	GF	GA	GD	Pts	Qualification
1	United Arab Emirates	3	3	0	0	15	0	+15	9	Final tournament
2	Palestine (H)	3	2	0	1	3	5	−2	6	
3	Afghanistan	3	1	0	2	2	5	−3	3	
4	India	3	0	0	3	0	10	−10	0	

Source: AFC
Rules for classification: Qualification tiebreakers
(H) Hosts
2 October 2015
16:00

United Arab Emirates	3–0	Afghanistan
Al-Noobi 7'; Lafi 20', 25'	Report

Faisal Al-Husseini International Stadium, Al-Ram
Attendance: 500
Referee: Aziz Asimov (Uzbekistan)
2 October 2015
19:00

Palestine	1–0	India
Yousef 16'	Report

Faisal Al-Husseini International Stadium, Al-Ram
Attendance: 2,500
Referee: Yousef Al-Marzouq (Kuwait)

4 October 2015
16:00

India	0–7	United Arab Emirates
	Report	Yaqoub 14' (pen.); Lafi 34', 45+1', 88'; Rashed 45+2' (pen.); Al-Noobi 54' (pen.); Rahsid 84'

Faisal Al-Husseini International Stadium, Al-Ram
Attendance: 100
Referee: Khamis Al-Marri (Qatar)
4 October 2015
19:00

Afghanistan	0–2	Palestine
	Report	Obaid 50'; Shobaki 90'

Faisal Al-Husseini International Stadium, Al-Ram
Attendance: 700
Referee: Adham Makhadmeh (Jordan)

6 October 2015
17:00

United Arab Emirates	5–0	Palestine
Lafi 3'; Al-Matroushi 28'; Farawi 35' (o.g.); Yaqoub 90'; Al-Jnebi 90+1'	Report

Arab American University Stadium, Jenin
Attendance: 500
Referee: Yousef Al-Marzouq (Kuwait)
6 October 2015
17:00

India	0–2	Afghanistan
	Report	Kuruniyan 43' (o.g.); Yari 79'

Faisal Al-Husseini International Stadium, Al-Ram
Attendance: 25
Referee: Adham Makhadmeh (Jordan)

=== Group D ===
- All matches were held in Qatar.
- Times listed are UTC+3.

Pos	Team	Pld	W	D	L	GF	GA	GD	Pts	Qualification
1	Qatar (H)	3	3	0	0	13	2	+11	9	Final tournament
2	Oman	3	1	1	1	5	3	+2	4	
3	Lebanon	3	1	1	1	4	5	−1	4	
4	Kyrgyzstan	3	0	0	3	3	15	−12	0	

Source: AFC
Rules for classification: Qualification tiebreakers
(H) Hosts
2 October 2015
18:00

Qatar	7–1	Kyrgyzstan
Issa 12', 82'; Al-Rawai 36'; Moustafa 51'; Al-Ahrak 54'; Shehata 61' (pen.); Muneer 71'	Report	Shaarbekov 58'

Grand Hamad Stadium, Doha
Attendance: 250
Referee: Çarymyrat Gurbanow (Turkmenistan)
2 October 2015
20:30

Oman	0–0	Lebanon
	Report

Grand Hamad Stadium, Doha
Attendance: 150
Referee: Khurram Shahzad (Pakistan)

4 October 2015
18:00

Kyrgyzstan	1–4	Oman
Batyrkanov 19'	Report	A. Al-Awadi 13' (pen.); T. Al-Awadi 54'; Al-Aghbari 63'; Al-Ghassani 75'

Grand Hamad Stadium, Doha
Attendance: 50
Referee: Turki Al-Khudhayr (Saudi Arabia)
4 October 2015
20:30

Lebanon	0–4	Qatar
	Report	Muneer 33'; Al-Ahrak 67' (pen.); Issa 75'; Shehata 90'

Grand Hamad Stadium, Doha
Attendance: 300
Referee: Ammar Al-Jeneibi (United Arab Emirates)

6 October 2015
18:00

Qatar	2–1	Oman
Salman 45+3' (pen.); Muneer 48'	Report	A. Al-Awadi 30' (pen.)

Grand Hamad Stadium, Doha
Attendance: 900
Referee: Çarymyrat Gurbanow (Turkmenistan)
6 October 2015
20:30

Lebanon	4–1	Kyrgyzstan
Bahor 6'; Monzer 45+2'; Boutros 62' (pen.); Lahoud 66'	Report	Yrysbek 63'

Grand Hamad Stadium, Doha
Attendance: 50
Referee: Ammar Al-Jeneibi (United Arab Emirates)

=== Group E ===
- All matches were held in Iran.
- Times listed are UTC+3:30.

Pos	Team	Pld	W	D	L	GF	GA	GD	Pts	Qualification
1	Iran (H)	3	3	0	0	15	0	+15	9	Final tournament
2	Kuwait	3	1	1	1	3	4	−1	4	
3	Jordan	3	1	0	2	4	5	−1	3	
4	Nepal	3	0	1	2	1	14	−13	1	

Source: AFC
Rules for classification: Qualification tiebreakers
(H) Hosts
2 October 2015
16:00

Kuwait	2–1	Jordan
Saeed 20'; Karam 30' (pen.)	Report	Harbi 39'

Samen Al-Aeme Stadium, Mashhad
Attendance: 200
Referee: Fahad Al-Marri (Qatar)
2 October 2015
19:00

Iran	10–0	Nepal
Karamolachaab 1', 13', 84', 90+1'; Mokhtari 2', 44'; Shojaei 32'; Shekari 57' (pen.), 87'; Khorram 79'	Report

Samen Al-Aeme Stadium, Mashhad
Attendance: 653
Referee: Dmitriy Mashentsev (Kyrgyzstan)

4 October 2015
16:00

Nepal	1–1	Kuwait
Magar 61'	Report	Al Enezi 71'

Samen Al-Aeme Stadium, Mashhad
Attendance: 55
Referee: Yaqoob Abdul Baki (Oman)
4 October 2015
19:00

Jordan	0–3	Iran
	Report	Daghestani 45'; Shekari 52'; Mokhtari 63'

Samen Al-Aeme Stadium, Mashhad
Attendance: 573
Referee: Wang Di (China)

6 October 2015
16:00

Jordan	3–0	Nepal
Ahmad 6'; Maher 14'; Ibrahim 90+2'	Report

Samen Al-Aeme Stadium, Mashhad
Attendance: 212
Referee: Yaqoob Abdul Baki (Oman)
6 October 2015
19:00

Iran	2–0	Kuwait
Karamolachaab 45+4'; Noorafkan 62'	Report

Samen Al-Aeme Stadium, Mashhad
Attendance: 1,317
Referee: Wang Di (China)

=== Group F ===
- All matches were held in Tajikistan.
- Times listed are UTC+5.

Pos	Team	Pld	W	D	L	GF	GA	GD	Pts	Qualification
1	Iraq	3	3	0	0	11	1	+10	9	Final tournament
2	Tajikistan (H)	3	2	0	1	11	4	+7	6	Final tournament
3	Bahrain	3	1	0	2	7	7	0	3	Final tournament as hosts
4	Maldives	3	0	0	3	0	17	−17	0	

Source: AFC
Rules for classification: Qualification tiebreakers
(H) Hosts
2 October 2015
15:00

Bahrain	4–0	Maldives
Jasim 25', 81'; Al-Naar 26'; Sayed 88'	Report

Pamir Stadium, Dushanbe
Attendance: 300
Referee: Nivon Robesh Gamini (Sri Lanka)
2 October 2015
18:00

Iraq	2–0	Tajikistan
Abbas 3'; J. Mohammed 79'	Report

Pamir Stadium, Dushanbe
Attendance: 2,500
Referee: Ali Shaban (Kuwait)

4 October 2015
15:00

Maldives	0–5	Iraq
	Report	Abbas 10', 39'; Sabah 14'; Hasan 27', 52'

Pamir Stadium, Dushanbe
Attendance: 500
Referee: Pratap Singh (India)
4 October 2015
18:00

Tajikistan	3–2	Bahrain
Safarov 40', 83'; Ravshanbekov 58'	Report	Ebrahim 42'; Jasim 45'

Pamir Stadium, Dushanbe
Attendance: 3,500
Referee: Nivon Robesh Gamini (Sri Lanka)

6 October 2015
15:00

Iraq	4–1	Bahrain
Attwan 56'; Abbas 62'; Sabah 77'; J. Mohammed 88'	Report	Jasim 90+2'

Pamir Stadium, Dushanbe
Attendance: 1,000
Referee: Ali Shaban (Kuwait)
6 October 2015
18:00

Maldives	0–8	Tajikistan
	Report	Panjshanbe 25', 54'; Khamrokulov 35', 61'; Alisheri 50', 68', 80'; Kholov 87'

Pamir Stadium, Dushanbe
Attendance: 4,000
Referee: Pratap Singh (India)

=== Group G ===
- All matches were held in Myanmar.
- Times listed are UTC+6:30.

Pos	Team	Pld	W	D	L	GF	GA	GD	Pts	Qualification
1	Vietnam	4	4	0	0	11	2	+9	12	Final tournament
2	Myanmar (H)	4	2	1	1	6	2	+4	7	
3	Timor-Leste	4	1	2	1	5	2	+3	5	
4	Hong Kong	4	1	1	2	7	5	+2	4	
5	Brunei	4	0	0	4	0	18	−18	0	

Source: AFC
Rules for classification: Qualification tiebreakers
(H) Hosts
28 September 2015
15:30

Hong Kong	1–3	Vietnam
Ho 42'	Report	Hà Đức Chinh 7', 59'; Nguyễn Tiến Linh 48'

Thuwunna Stadium, Yangon
Attendance: 326
Referee: Sukhbir Singh (Singapore)
28 September 2015
18:30

Timor-Leste	4–0	Brunei
Gama 15'; Viegas 19', 32'; Cruz 28'	Report

Thuwunna Stadium, Yangon
Attendance: 220
Referee: Ma Ning (China)

30 September 2015
15:30

Timor-Leste	0–0	Hong Kong
	Report

Thuwunna Stadium, Yangon
Attendance: 0
Referee: Hiroyuki Kimura (Japan)
30 September 2015
18:30

Brunei	0–4	Myanmar
	Report	Zin Phyo Aung 7' (pen.); Ye Yint Aung 27'; Htoo Kyant Lwin 29'; Aung Zin Phyo 46'

Thuwunna Stadium, Yangon
Attendance: 15
Referee: Ali Sabah Adday Al-Qaysi (Iraq)

2 October 2015
15:30

Vietnam	5–0	Brunei
Hồ Minh Dĩ 2', 45+5'; Lâm Thuận 25'; Trần Duy Khánh 34'; Phạm Trọng Hóa 36'	Report

Thuwunna Stadium, Yangon
Attendance: 221
Referee: Kao Jung-fang (Chinese Taipei)
2 October 2015
18:30

Myanmar	0–0	Timor-Leste
	Report

Thuwunna Stadium, Yangon
Attendance: 3,805
Referee: Ma Ning (China)

4 October 2015
15:30

Vietnam	2–1	Timor-Leste
Nguyễn Trọng Đại 4'; Nguyễn Quang Hải 17'	Report	Cruz 89'

Thuwunna Stadium, Yangon
Attendance: 396
Referee: Hiroyuki Kimura (Japan)
4 October 2015
18:30

Hong Kong	1–2	Myanmar
Ngan Cheuk Pan 73'	Report	Aung Zin Phyo 88'; Aung Moe Thu 90+6'

Thuwunna Stadium, Yangon
Attendance: 4,510
Referee: Sukhbir Singh (Singapore)

6 October 2015
15:30

Brunei	0–5	Hong Kong
	Report	Chan Pak Hei 39'; Ngan Cheuk Pan 41', 58'; Harima 49'; Cheng Chin Lung 73'

Thuwunna Stadium, Yangon
Attendance: 798
Referee: Hiroyuki Kimura (Japan)
6 October 2015
18:30

Myanmar	0–1	Vietnam
	Report	Hà Đức Chinh 19'

Thuwunna Stadium, Yangon
Attendance: 18,070
Referee: Ali Sabah Adday Al-Qaysi (Iraq)

=== Group H ===
- All matches were held in Thailand.
- Times listed are UTC+7.

Pos	Team	Pld	W	D	L	GF	GA	GD	Pts	Qualification
1	South Korea	4	4	0	0	26	4	+22	12	Final tournament
2	Thailand (H)	4	3	0	1	14	2	+12	9	Final tournament
3	Singapore	4	1	1	2	14	11	+3	4	
4	Chinese Taipei	4	1	1	2	13	12	+1	4	
5	Northern Mariana	4	0	0	4	0	38	−38	0	

Source: AFC
Rules for classification: Qualification tiebreakers
(H) Hosts
28 September 2015
15:00

Singapore	2–6	South Korea
Hami 52'; Low 60'	Report	Kim Jeong-hwan 23'; Lee Dong-jun 54', 61', 90+1'; Kang Ji-hoon 82'; Kim Si-woo 89'

Rajamangala Stadium, Bangkok
Attendance: 200
Referee: Fu Ming (China)
28 September 2015
19:00

Northern Mariana	0–10	Chinese Taipei
	Report	Kao Wei-jie 2'; Chen Hung-wei 12', 29'; Yu Chia-huang 17', 64', 79'; Chao Ming-hsiu 47', 61'; Cheng Chun-hsien 73', 90+1'

Rajamangala Stadium, Bangkok
Attendance: 100
Referee: Võ Minh Trí (Vietnam)

30 September 2015
15:00

Northern Mariana	0–10	Singapore
	Report	Hami 10', 36'; Hui 39'; Pereira 56' (pen.); Irfan 61', 90+2'; Ariyan 82'; Raj 83'; Low 87'; Shah 90'

SCG Stadium, Nonthaburi
Attendance: 50
Referee: Jumpei Iida (Japan)
30 September 2015
19:00

Chinese Taipei	0–3	Thailand
	Report	Anon 21'; Suksan 30', 36'

SCG Stadium, Nonthaburi
Attendance: 2,159
Referee: Mohammad Abu Loum (Jordan)

2 October 2015
15:00

South Korea	7–1	Chinese Taipei
Kim Dae-won 12', 29'; Kim Seok-jin 21', 79'; Kang Ji-hoon 39', 76'; Lee Dong-jun 73'	Report	Yu Chia-huang 74'

SCG Stadium, Nonthaburi
Attendance: 200
Referee: Võ Minh Trí (Vietnam)
2 October 2015
19:00

Thailand	7–0	Northern Mariana
Sorawit 2', 45'; Thosert-Belcher 20' (o.g.); Anon 38', 67' (pen.); Wisarut 63'; Ritthidet 72'	Report

SCG Stadium, Nonthaburi
Attendance: 1,000
Referee: Fu Ming (China)

4 October 2015
15:00

South Korea	11–0	Northern Mariana
Choe Ik-jin 3', 33', 90+2'; Kim Moo-gun 10'; Kwon Gi-pyo 39'; Jeong Tae-wook 46', 54', 83'; Kim Si-woo 49', 79' (pen.); Kim Geon-ung 68'	Report

SCG Stadium, Nonthaburi
Attendance: 50
Referee: Mohammad Abu Loum (Jordan)
4 October 2015
19:00

Singapore	0–3	Thailand
	Report	Ritthidet 34'; Suksan 42'; Worachit 51'

SCG Stadium, Nonthaburi
Attendance: 3,284
Referee: Jumpei Iida (Japan)

6 October 2015
15:00

Chinese Taipei	2–2	Singapore
Yu Chia-huang 33'; Wang Li-an 83'	Report	Haiqal 40', 90+1' (pen.)

SCG Stadium, Nonthaburi
Attendance: 100
Referee: Võ Minh Trí (Vietnam)
6 October 2015
19:00

Thailand	1–2	South Korea
Sirimongkhon 69'	Report	Kang Ji-hoon 12'; Kim Moo-gun 90'

SCG Stadium, Nonthaburi
Attendance: 9,120
Referee: Fu Ming (China)

=== Group I ===
- All matches were held in China
- Times listed are UTC+8.

Pos	Team	Pld	W	D	L	GF	GA	GD	Pts	Qualification
1	China (H)	3	3	0	0	16	0	+16	9	Final tournament
2	North Korea	3	2	0	1	7	3	+4	6	Final tournament
3	Malaysia	3	1	0	2	4	8	−4	3	
4	Macau	3	0	0	3	1	17	−16	0	

Source: AFC
Rules for classification: Qualification tiebreakers
(H) Hosts
2 October 2015
15:30

North Korea	6–0	Macau
Han Il-hyok 8', 16', 21' (pen.), 25'; Jon Chung-il 33'; Pak Kwang-chon 88'	Report

Huai’an Sports Centre Stadium, Huai'an
Attendance: 1,815
Referee: Sivakorn Pu-Udom (Thailand)
2 October 2015
19:35

China	6–0	Malaysia
Zhang Yuning 32' (pen.), 34'; Gao Haisheng 48', 53'; Yao Daogang 58'; Shan Huanhuan 87'	Report

Huai’an Sports Centre Stadium, Huai'an
Attendance: 5,188
Referee: Ryuji Sato (Japan)

4 October 2015
15:30

Malaysia	0–1	North Korea
	Report	Han Il-hyok 54'

Huai’an Sports Centre Stadium, Huai'an
Attendance: 1,200
Referee: Sivakorn Pu-Udom (Thailand)
4 October 2015
19:35

Macau	0–7	China
	Report	Gao Huaze 12', 18'; Yang Liyu 25'; Yan Dinghao 51'; Zhang Yuning 72', 74'; Shan Huanhuan 85'

Huai’an Sports Centre Stadium, Huai'an
Attendance: 3,500
Referee: Yudai Yamamoto (Japan)

6 October 2015
15:30

Malaysia	4–1	Macau
Jafri 3', 69', 82'; Danial 63'	Report	Vitorino 49'

Huai’an Sports Centre Stadium, Huai'an
Attendance: 1,800
Referee: Yudai Yamamoto (Japan)
6 October 2015
19:35

North Korea	0–3	China
	Report	Zhang Yuning 37'; Lin Liangming 39', 61'

Huai’an Sports Centre Stadium, Huai'an
Attendance: 12,000
Referee: Ryuji Sato (Japan)

=== Group J ===
- All matches were held in Laos.
- Times listed are UTC+7.

Pos	Team	Pld	W	D	L	GF	GA	GD	Pts	Qualification
1	Japan	3	3	0	0	11	0	+11	9	Final tournament
2	Australia	3	2	0	1	8	3	+5	6	Final tournament
3	Laos (H)	3	1	0	2	2	5	−3	3	
4	Philippines	3	0	0	3	1	14	−13	0	

Source: AFC
Rules for classification: Qualification tiebreakers
(H) Hosts
2 October 2015
16:00

Australia	6–0	Philippines
D'Agostino 8'; Kuzmanovski 14', 39'; Mells 28'; Fofanah 78'; Pandurevic 90+1'	Report

Laos National Stadium, Vientiane
Attendance: 200
Referee: Kim Hee-gon (South Korea)
2 October 2015
19:00

Japan	2–0	Laos
Ogawa 39'; Takagi 62'	Report

Laos National Stadium, Vientiane
Attendance: 1,856
Referee: Tan Hai (China)

4 October 2015
16:00

Philippines	0–6	Japan
	Report	Noda 6'; Yoshihira 26', 88'; Iwasaki 69' (pen.), 71'; Ogawa 81'

Laos National Stadium, Vientiane
Attendance: 98
Referee: Tan Hai (China)
4 October 2015
19:00

Laos	0–2	Australia
	Report	Kuzmanovski 43'; Shabow 46'

Laos National Stadium, Vientiane
Attendance: 1,500
Referee: Kim Hee-gon (South Korea)

6 October 2015
16:00

Japan	3–0	Australia
Takagi 45+1'; Sakai 45+2' (pen.); Ogawa 71' (pen.)	Report

Laos National Stadium, Vientiane
Attendance: 100
Referee: Fahad Al-Mirdasi (Saudi Arabia)
6 October 2015
19:00

Philippines	1–2	Laos
Gayoso 19'	Report	Thanin 5'; Maitee 42'

Laos National Stadium, Vientiane
Attendance: 1,000
Referee: Kim Hee-gon (South Korea)

== Ranking of second-placed teams ==
The ranking among the runner-up team of all groups are determined as follows:

1. Greater number of points obtained in the group matches;
2. Greater goal difference resulting from the group matches;
3. Greater number of goals scored in group matches;
4. Greater number of wins in the group matches;
5. Fewer score calculated according to the number of yellow and red cards received in the group matches (1 point for a single yellow card, 3 points for a red card as a consequence of two yellow cards, 3 points for a direct red card, 4 points for a yellow card followed by a direct red card);
6. Drawing of lots.

In order to ensure equality when comparing the runner-up team of all groups, the results of the matches against the fifth-placed team in the groups having five teams are ignored due to the other groups having only four teams.

Pos	Grp	Team	Pld	W	D	L	GF	GA	GD	Pts	Qualification
1	F	Tajikistan	3	2	0	1	11	4	+7	6	Final tournament
2	J	Australia	3	2	0	1	8	3	+5	6	Final tournament
3	H	Thailand	3	2	0	1	7	2	+5	6	Final tournament
4	I	North Korea	3	2	0	1	7	3	+4	6	Final tournament
5	B	Yemen	3	2	0	1	2	2	0	6	Final tournament
6	C	Palestine	3	2	0	1	3	5	−2	6	
7	D	Oman	3	1	1	1	5	3	+2	4	
8	G	Myanmar	3	1	1	1	2	2	0	4	
9	E	Kuwait	3	1	1	1	3	4	−1	4	
10	A	Bangladesh	3	1	1	1	3	5	−2	4	

Source: AFC

== Qualified teams ==
The following 16 teams qualified for the final tournament.

Team	Qualified as	Qualified on	Previous appearances in tournament^{2}
Bahrain	Hosts	3 June 2015	8 (1973, 1975, 1977, 1978, 1986, 1990, 1994, 2010)
Uzbekistan	Group A winners	6 October 2015	6 (2002, 2004, 2008, 2010, 2012, 2014)
Saudi Arabia	Group B winners	6 October 2015	12 (1973, 1977, 1978, 1985, **1986**, **1992**, 1998, 2002, 2006, 2008, 2010, 2012)
United Arab Emirates	Group C winners	6 October 2015	12 (1982, 1985, 1988, 1992, 1996, 2000, 2002, 2006, **2008**, 2010, 2012, 2014)
Qatar	Group D winners	6 October 2015	12 (1980, 1986, 1988, 1990, 1992, 1994, 1996, 1998, 2002, 2004, 2012, **2014**)
Iran	Group E winners	6 October 2015	19 (1969, 1970, 1971, 1972, **1973**, **1974**, **1975**, **1976**, 1977, 1978, 1992, 1996, 2000, 2004, 2006, 2008, 2010, 2012, 2014)
Iraq	Group F winners	6 October 2015	15 (**1975**, 1976, **1977**, **1978**, 1982, **1988**, 1994, 1998, **2000**, 2004, 2006, 2008, 2010, 2012, 2014)
Vietnam	Group G winners	6 October 2015	17 (1961^{3}, 1962^{3}, 1963^{3}, 1964^{3}, 1965^{3}, 1967^{3}, 1968^{3}, 1969^{3}, 1970^{3}, 1971^{3}, 1974^{3}, 2002, 2004, 2006, 2010, 2012, 2014)
South Korea	Group H winners	6 October 2015	36 (**1959**, **1960**, 1961, 1962, **1963**, 1964, 1965, 1966, 1967, 1968, 1969, 1970, 1971, 1972, 1973, 1974, 1976, 1977, **1978**, **1980**, **1982**, 1986, 1988, **1990**, 1992, 1994, **1996**, **1998**, 2000, **2002**, **2004**, 2006, 2008, 2010, **2012**, 2014)
China	Group I winners	6 October 2015	16 (1975, 1976, 1978, 1982, **1985**, 1988, 1996, 1998, 2000, 2002, 2004, 2006, 2008, 2010, 2012, 2014)
Japan	Group J winners	6 October 2015	35 (1959, 1960, 1961, 1962, 1963, 1964, 1965, 1966, 1967, 1968, 1969, 1970, 1971, 1972, 1973, 1974, 1975, 1976, 1977, 1978, 1980, 1988, 1990, 1992, 1994, 1996, 1998, 2000, 2002, 2004, 2006, 2008, 2010, 2012, 2014)
Tajikistan	1st best runners-up	6 October 2015	2 (2006, 2008)
Australia	2nd best runners-up	6 October 2015	5 (2006, 2008, 2010, 2012, 2014)
Thailand	3rd best runners-up	6 October 2015	31 (1959, 1960, 1961, **1962**, 1963, 1964, 1965, 1966, 1967, 1968, **1969**, 1970, 1971, 1972, 1973, 1974, 1976, 1980, 1985, 1992, 1994, 1996, 1998, 2000, 2002, 2004, 2006, 2008, 2010, 2012, 2014)
North Korea	4th best runners-up	6 October 2015	11 (1975, **1976**, 1978, 1986, 1988, 1990, **2006**, 2008, **2010**, 2012, 2014)
Yemen	5th best runners-up	6 October 2015	5 (1978, 2004, 2008, 2010, 2014)

^{3} As South Vietnam
^{2} Bold indicates champion for that year. Italic indicates host for that year.

== Goalscorers ==
6 goals

- (United Arab Emirates) Majid Lafi

5 goals

- (China) Zhang Yuning
- (Chinese Taipei) Yu Chia-huang
- (Iran) Reza Karamolachaab
- (North Korea) Han Il-hyok

4 goals

- (Bahrain) Jasim Marhoon
- (Iraq) Alaa Abbas
- (Saudi Arabia) Abdulrahman Al-Yami
- (South Korea) Kang Ji-hoon
- (South Korea) Lee Dong-jun

3 goals

- (Australia) Steve Kuzmanovski
- (Hong Kong) Ngan Cheuk Pan
- (Iran) Nima Mokhtari
- (Iran) Reza Shekari
- (Japan) Koki Ogawa
- (Malaysia) Jafri Firdaus Chew
- (Qatar) Sayed Issa
- (Qatar) Khalid Muneer
- (Singapore) Hami Syahin
- (South Korea) Choe Ik-jin
- (South Korea) Jeong Tae-wook
- (South Korea) Kim Si-woo
- (Tajikistan) Khotam Alisheri
- (Thailand) Anon Amornlerdsak
- (Thailand) Suksan Mungpao
- (Uzbekistan) Bobir Abdixolikov
- (Uzbekistan) Doston Ibragimov
- (Vietnam) Hà Đức Chinh

2 goals

- (Bangladesh) Masuk Mia Jony
- (China) Gao Haisheng
- (China) Gao Huaze
- (China) Lin Liangming
- (China) Shan Huanhuan
- (Chinese Taipei) Chao Ming-hsiu
- (Chinese Taipei) Chen Hung-wei
- (Chinese Taipei) Cheng Chun-hsien
- (Iraq) Mohammed Hasan
- (Iraq) Jasim Mohammed
- (Iraq) Ameer Sabah
- (Japan) Yuto Iwasaki
- (Japan) Akito Takagi
- (Japan) Tsubasa Yoshihira
- (Myanmar) Aung Zin Phyo
- (Oman) Asad Al-Awadi
- (Qatar) Abdullah Al-Ahrak
- (Qatar) Hazem Shehata
- (Saudi Arabia) Ayman Al-Khulaif
- (Singapore) Irfan Fandi
- (Singapore) Haiqal Pashia
- (Singapore) Gareth Low
- (South Korea) Kim Dae-won
- (South Korea) Kim Moo-gun
- (South Korea) Kim Seok-jin
- (Sri Lanka) Afam Akram
- (Tajikistan) Nuriddin Khamrokulov
- (Tajikistan) Ehson Panjshanbe
- (Tajikistan) Amirdzhon Safarov
- (Thailand) Sorawit Panthong
- (Thailand) Ritthidet Phensawat
- (Timor-Leste) Henrique Cruz
- (Timor-Leste) Nelson Viegas
- (Turkmenistan) Mihail Titow
- (United Arab Emirates) Hassan Al-Noobi
- (United Arab Emirates) Jassem Yaqoub
- (Uzbekistan) Sanjar Kodirkulov
- (Uzbekistan) Nurillo Tukhtasinov
- (Vietnam) Hồ Minh Dĩ

1 goal

- (Afghanistan) Reza Allah Yari
- (Australia) Nicholas D'Agostino
- (Australia) Alusine Fofanah
- (Australia) George Mells
- (Australia) Dejan Pandurevic
- (Australia) Mario Shabow
- (Bahrain) Sayed Ahmed
- (Bahrain) Talal Ali Al-Naar
- (Bahrain) Sayed Ebrahim
- (Bangladesh) Mannaf Rabby
- (Bhutan) Sonam Tobgay
- (China) Yan Dinghao
- (China) Yang Liyu
- (China) Yao Daogang
- (Chinese Taipei) Kao Wei-jie
- (Chinese Taipei) Wang Li-an
- (Hong Kong) Chan Pak Hei
- (Hong Kong) Cheng Chin Lung
- (Hong Kong) Hirokane Harima
- (Hong Kong) Matthew Ho
- (Iran) Nima Daghestani
- (Iran) Mohammad Khorram
- (Iran) Omid Noorafkan
- (Iran) Ali Shojaei
- (Iraq) Amjad Attwan
- (Japan) Hiroki Noda
- (Japan) Daisuke Sakai
- (Jordan) Ahmad Harbi Abdallah
- (Jordan) Anas Ahmad Mahmoud Hammad
- (Jordan) Hijazi Maher Hijazi
- (Jordan) Abdallah Ibrahim She
- (Kuwait) Abdullah Karam
- (Kuwait) Khaled Al Enezi
- (Kuwait) Naser Saeed
- (Kyrgyzstan) Ernist Batyrkanov
- (Kyrgyzstan) Kadyrbek Shaarbekov
- (Kyrgyzstan) Uulu Yrysbek
- (Laos) Maitee Hatsady
- (Laos) Thanin Phanthavong
- (Lebanon) Alex Boutros
- (Lebanon) Ali Bahor
- (Lebanon) Joseph Michel Lahoud
- (Lebanon) Hussein Monzer
- (Macau) Jorge Marcelo Vitorino
- (Malaysia) Danial Ashraf
- (Myanmar) Aung Moe Thu
- (Myanmar) Htoo Kyant Lwin
- (Myanmar) Ye Yint Aung
- (Myanmar) Zin Phyo Aung
- (Nepal) Bimal Magar
- (North Korea) Jon Chung-il
- (North Korea) Pak Kwang-chon
- (Oman) Zahir Al-Aghbari
- (Oman) Talal Al-Awadi
- (Oman) Mohsin Al-Ghassani
- (Palestine) Mohammed Obaid
- (Palestine) Munther Shobaki
- (Palestine) Mahmoud Yousef
- (Philippines) Javier Gayoso
- (Qatar) Abdelrahman Moustafa
- (Qatar) Bassam Al-Rawai
- (Qatar) Tarek Salman
- (Saudi Arabia) Mohammad Al-Bassas
- (Saudi Arabia) Fahad Al-Harbi
- (Saudi Arabia) Meshari Al-Kahtani
- (Saudi Arabia) Ammar Al-Najar
- (Saudi Arabia) Sami Al-Najei
- (Singapore) Ariyan Malik
- (Singapore) Justin Hui
- (Singapore) Joshua Pereira
- (Singapore) Karthik Raj
- (Singapore) Shah Zulkarnean
- (South Korea) Kim Geon-ung
- (South Korea) Kim Jeong-hwan
- (South Korea) Kwon Gi-pyo
- (Syria) Alaa Edeen Yasin Dali
- (Syria) Yousef Arafa
- (Tajikistan) Sunatullo Kholov
- (Tajikistan) Kuvvatbek Ravshanbekov
- (Thailand) Wisarut Imura
- (Thailand) Sirimongkhon Jitbanjong
- (Thailand) Worachit Kanitsribampen
- (Timor-Leste) Rufino Gama
- (Turkmenistan) Begenç Akmämmedow
- (Turkmenistan) Guvanchmyrat Gurbangulyyev
- (United Arab Emirates) Mohamed Al-Jnebi
- (United Arab Emirates) Faisl Al-Matroushi
- (United Arab Emirates) Ahmed Rashed
- (United Arab Emirates) Mohamed Rahsid
- (Uzbekistan) Husniddin Gofurov
- (Uzbekistan) Sayidjamol Davlatjonov
- (Uzbekistan) Sharof Mukhiddinov
- (Uzbekistan) Sukhrob Nurulloev
- (Vietnam) Lâm Thuận
- (Vietnam) Nguyễn Quang Hải
- (Vietnam) Nguyễn Tiến Linh
- (Vietnam) Nguyễn Trọng Đại
- (Vietnam) Phạm Trọng Hóa
- (Vietnam) Trần Duy Khánh
- (Yemen) Abdulhakim Ahmed
- (Yemen) Mohammed Al-Huthaifi

1 own goal

- (India) Ashique Kuruniyan (against Afghanistan)
- (Northern Mariana Islands) Terrence Thosert-Belcher (against Thailand)
- (Palestine) Basheer Farawi (against United Arab Emirates)

Source: the-afc.com
