= 2016 AFC U-19 Championship =

بطولة آسيا للشباب تحت 19 عاما 2016

Tournament details
- Host country: Bahrain
- Dates: 13–30 October
- Teams: 16 (from 1 confederation)
- Venues: 2 (in 2 host cities)

Final positions
- Champions: Japan (1st title)
- Runners-up: Saudi Arabia

Tournament statistics
- Matches played: 31
- Goals scored: 84 (2.71 per match)
- Attendance: 39,304 (1,268 per match)
- Top scorer(s): (Saudi Arabia) Sami Al-Najei (Saudi Arabia) Abdulrahman Al-Yami (4 goals each)
- Best player: (Japan) Ritsu Dōan
- Fair play award: Japan

The 2016 AFC U-19 Championship was the 39th edition of the AFC U-19 Championship, the biennial international youth football championship organised by the Asian Football Confederation (AFC) for the men's under-19 national teams of Asia. The tournament was hosted by Bahrain, as announced by the AFC on 3 June 2015, and was scheduled to be played between 13–30 October 2016. A total of 16 teams played in the tournament.

Same as previous editions, the tournament acted as the AFC qualifiers for the FIFA U-20 World Cup. The top four teams of the tournament qualified for the 2017 FIFA U-20 World Cup in South Korea as the AFC representatives, besides South Korea who qualified automatically as hosts. If South Korea were among the top four teams, three play-off matches would be played to decide the fifth-placed team which also qualify for the 2017 FIFA U-20 World Cup; however, this was not necessary as South Korea were eliminated in the group stage.

Japan conquered the title for the first time after beating Saudi Arabia in the final's penalty shootout, and also set a record in the competition for being the first team to win the tournament without conceding a single goal.

On 25 October 2016, the AFC President, Salman Al-Khalifa, congratulated Saudi Arabia, Vietnam, IR Iran and Japan on qualifying for the FIFA U-20 World Cup 2017. The four teams will join hosts South Korea to make up Asia's five representatives at the tournament.

== Qualification ==
The draw for the qualifiers was held on 5 June 2015. A total of 43 teams were drawn into ten groups, with the ten group winners and the five best runners-up qualifying for the final tournament, together with Bahrain who qualified automatically as hosts but also competed in the qualifying stage.

The qualifiers were played between 28 September – 6 October 2015.

=== Qualified teams ===
The following 16 teams qualified for the final tournament.

Team	Qualified as	Appearance	Previous best performance
Bahrain	Hosts	9th	Runners-up (1986)
Japan	Group J winners	36th	Runners-up (1973, 1994, 1998, 2000, 2002, 2006)
Iraq	Group F winners	16th	Champions (1975, 1977, 1978, 1988, 2000)
China	Group I winners	17th	Champions (1985)
Vietnam	Group G winners	18th	Quarter-finals (1967^{1}, 1969^{1})
Uzbekistan	Group A winners	7th	Runners-up (2008)
South Korea	Group H winners	37th	Champions (1959, 1960, 1963, 1978, 1980, 1982, 1990, 1996, 1998, 2002, 2004, 2012)
Tajikistan	Group F (1st best) runners-up	3rd	Group stage (2006, 2008)
United Arab Emirates	Group C winners	13th	Champions (2008)
Australia	Group J (2nd best) runners-up	6th	Runners-up (2010)
Qatar	Group D winners	13th	Champions (2014)
Thailand	Group H (3rd best) runners-up	32nd	Champions (1962, 1969)
Saudi Arabia	Group B winners	13th	Champions (1986, 1992)
North Korea	Group I (4th best) runners-up	12th	Champions (1976, 2006, 2010)
Iran	Group E winners	20th	Champions (1973, 1974, 1975, 1976)
Yemen	Group B (5th best) runners-up	6th	Group stage (1978, 2004, 2008, 2010, 2014)

^{1} As South Vietnam

== Venues ==
The tournament is played in two venues:

Riffa	2016 AFC U-19 Championship (Bahrain)
Bahrain National Stadium	2016 AFC U-19 Championship (Bahrain)
Capacity: 30,000	2016 AFC U-19 Championship (Bahrain)
Isa Town	2016 AFC U-19 Championship (Bahrain)
Khalifa Sports City Stadium	2016 AFC U-19 Championship (Bahrain)
Capacity: 20,000	2016 AFC U-19 Championship (Bahrain)

== Draw ==
The draw for the final tournament was held on 30 April 2016, 19:00 AST (UTC+3), in Manama. The 16 teams were drawn into four groups of four teams. The teams were seeded according to their performance in the previous edition in 2014.

Pot 1	Pot 2	Pot 3	Pot 4
Bahrain (hosts; position A1); Qatar; North Korea; Uzbekistan	Japan; Thailand; United Arab Emirates; China	Australia; Iraq; South Korea; Yemen	Iran; Vietnam; Saudi Arabia; Tajikistan

== Squads ==
Players born on or after 1 January 1997 are eligible to compete in the tournament. Each team can register a maximum of 23 players (minimum three of whom must be goalkeepers).

== Group stage ==
The top two teams of each group advance to the quarter-finals.

Tiebreakers

The teams are ranked according to points (3 points for a win, 1 point for a draw, 0 points for a loss). If tied on points, tiebreakers are applied in the following order:

1. Greater number of points obtained in the group matches between the teams concerned;
2. Goal difference resulting from the group matches between the teams concerned;
3. Greater number of goals scored in the group matches between the teams concerned;
4. If, after applying criteria 1 to 3, teams still have an equal ranking, criteria 1 to 3 are reapplied exclusively to the matches between the teams in question to determine their final rankings. If this procedure does not lead to a decision, criteria 5 to 9 apply;
5. Goal difference in all the group matches;
6. Greater number of goals scored in all the group matches;
7. Penalty shoot-out if only two teams are involved and they are both on the field of play;
8. Fewer score calculated according to the number of yellow and red cards received in the group matches (1 point for a single yellow card, 3 points for a red card as a consequence of two yellow cards, 3 points for a direct red card, 4 points for a yellow card followed by a direct red card);
9. Drawing of lots.

All times are local, AST (UTC+3).

=== Group A ===
Pos	Team	Pld	W	D	L	GF	GA	GD	Pts	Qualification
1	Bahrain (H)	3	2	0	1	7	6	+1	6 (Note: Head-to-head results: Bahrain 3–2 Saudi Arabia, South Korea 2–1 Bahrain, South Korea 1–2 Saudi Arabia. Head-to-head standings: Bahrain: 3 pts, 0 GD, 4 GF; Saudi Arabia: 3 pts, 0 GD, 4 GF; South Korea: 3 pts, 0 GD, 3 GF; South Korea are ranked third on head-to-head goals scored. Bahrain are ranked ahead of Saudi Arabia on their own head-to-head result.)	Knockout stage
2	Saudi Arabia	3	2	0	1	8	4	+4	6	Knockout stage
3	South Korea	3	2	0	1	6	4	+2	6	
4	Thailand	3	0	0	3	3	10	−7	0	

Source: AFC
Rules for classification: Group stage tiebreakers
(H) Hosts
Notes:
13 October 2016
16:30

Thailand	1–3	South Korea
Anon 76'	Report	Jeong Tae-wook 13'; Han Chan-hee 41'; Kang Ji-hoon 90+3'

Bahrain National Stadium, Riffa
Attendance: 200
Referee: Muhammad Taqi (Singapore)
13 October 2016
19:30

Bahrain	3–2	Saudi Arabia
Marhoon 41'; Al-Hardan 49' (pen.); Mohamed 90+4'	Report	Al-Shamlan 56'; Al-Najei 80' (pen.)

Khalifa Sports City Stadium, Isa Town
Attendance: 2,500
Referee: Ammar Al-Jeneibi (United Arab Emirates)

16 October 2016
16:30

Saudi Arabia	4–0	Thailand
Al-Shamlan 43'; Al-Muwallad 60'; Al-Khulaif 68'; Ghareeb 90+3'	Report

Bahrain National Stadium, Riffa
Attendance: 185
Referee: Timur Faizullin (Kyrgyzstan)
16 October 2016
19:30

South Korea	2–1	Bahrain
Cho Young-wook 84', 90+2'	Report	Ebrahim 56'

Khalifa Sports City Stadium, Isa Town
Attendance: 6,677
Referee: Mohammad Abu Loum (Jordan)

19 October 2016
19:30

Bahrain	3–2	Thailand
Al-Hardan 12' (pen.); Bughammar 47'; Al-Naar 51'	Report	Sittichok 30'; Supachai 84'

Khalifa Sports City Stadium, Isa Town
Attendance: 8,650
Referee: Jumpei Iida (Japan)
19 October 2016
19:30

South Korea	1–2	Saudi Arabia
Kim Geon-ung 32'	Report	Al-Najei 38'; Al-Amri 64'

Bahrain National Stadium, Riffa
Attendance: 210
Referee: Jarred Gillett (Australia)

=== Group B ===
Pos	Team	Pld	W	D	L	GF	GA	GD	Pts	Qualification
1	Iraq	3	2	1	0	5	0	+5	7	Knockout stage
2	Vietnam	3	1	2	0	3	2	+1	5	Knockout stage
3	United Arab Emirates	3	1	1	1	4	3	+1	4	
4	North Korea	3	0	0	3	2	9	−7	0	

Source: AFC
Rules for classification: Group stage tiebreakers
14 October 2016
16:30

North Korea	1–2	Vietnam
Ryang Hyon-ju 90+2'	Report	Hà Đức Chinh 71'; Đoàn Văn Hậu 90+1'

Khalifa Sports City Stadium, Isa Town
Attendance: 100
Referee: Khamis Al-Marri (Qatar)
14 October 2016
19:30

United Arab Emirates	0–1	Iraq
	Report	Kareem 26'

Khalifa Sports City Stadium, Isa Town
Attendance: 250
Referee: Jarred Gillett (Australia)

17 October 2016
16:30

Vietnam	1–1	United Arab Emirates
Hồ Minh Dĩ 21'	Report	Omar 58' (pen.)

Khalifa Sports City Stadium, Isa Town
Attendance: 50
Referee: Hanna Hattab (Syria)
17 October 2016
19:30

Iraq	4–0	North Korea
Fayyadh 54' (pen.); Kareem 63', 65'; Abbas 79'	Report

Khalifa Sports City Stadium, Isa Town
Attendance: 156
Referee: Turki Al-Khudhayr (Saudi Arabia)

20 October 2016
19:30

North Korea	1–3	United Arab Emirates
Han Kwang-song 8'	Report	Rashed 31'; Al-Matroushi 52'; Yaqoub 77'

Khalifa Sports City Stadium, Isa Town
Attendance: 155
Referee: Muhammad Taqi (Singapore)
20 October 2016
19:30

Iraq	0–0	Vietnam
	Report

Bahrain National Stadium, Riffa
Attendance: 263
Referee: Fu Ming (China)

=== Group C ===
Pos	Team	Pld	W	D	L	GF	GA	GD	Pts	Qualification
1	Japan	3	2	1	0	6	0	+6	7	Knockout stage
2	Iran	3	1	2	0	2	1	+1	5	Knockout stage
3	Qatar	3	1	1	1	2	4	−2	4	
4	Yemen	3	0	0	3	0	5	−5	0	

Source: AFC
Rules for classification: Group stage tiebreakers
14 October 2016
16:30

Japan	3–0	Yemen
Ogawa 47'; Iwasaki 79'; Hara 88'	Report

Bahrain National Stadium, Riffa
Attendance: 500
Referee: Jameel Abdulhusin (Bahrain)
14 October 2016
19:30

Qatar	1–1	Iran
Razzaghpour 38' (o.g.)	Report	Razzaghpour 58'

Bahrain National Stadium, Riffa
Attendance: 1,000
Referee: Fu Ming (China)

17 October 2016
16:30

Iran	0–0	Japan
	Report

Bahrain National Stadium, Riffa
Attendance: 225
Referee: Jarred Gillett (Australia)
17 October 2016
19:30

Yemen	0–1	Qatar
	Report	Umaru 84'

Bahrain National Stadium, Riffa
Attendance: 525
Referee: Nivon Robesh Gamini (Sri Lanka)

20 October 2016
16:30

Qatar	0–3	Japan
	Report	Iwasaki 14'; Miyoshi 45'; Tomiyasu 62'

Bahrain National Stadium, Riffa
Attendance: 120
Referee: Turki Al-Khudhayr (Saudi Arabia)
20 October 2016
16:30

Yemen	0–1	Iran
	Report	Razzaghpour 45'

Khalifa Sports City Stadium, Isa Town
Attendance: 535
Referee: Timur Faizullin (Kyrgyzstan)

=== Group D ===
Pos	Team	Pld	W	D	L	GF	GA	GD	Pts	Qualification
1	Uzbekistan	3	2	1	0	5	3	+2	7	Knockout stage
2	Tajikistan	3	1	1	1	3	2	+1	4	Knockout stage
3	Australia	3	1	1	1	3	3	0	4	
4	China	3	0	1	2	0	3	−3	1	

Source: AFC
Rules for classification: Group stage tiebreakers
15 October 2016
16:30

Uzbekistan	2–1	Tajikistan
Davlatjonov 67'; Yakhshiboev 72'	Report	Saidov 20'

Khalifa Sports City Stadium, Isa Town
Attendance: 100
Referee: Nivon Robesh Gamini (Sri Lanka)
15 October 2016
19:30

China	0–1	Australia
	Report	Shabow 46'

Bahrain National Stadium, Riffa
Attendance: 370
Referee: Jumpei Iida (Japan)

18 October 2016
16:30

Tajikistan	2–0	China
Panjshanbe 3'; Hamroqulov 65'	Report

Bahrain National Stadium, Riffa
Attendance: 82
Referee: Jameel Abdulhusin (Bahrain)
18 October 2016
19:30

Australia	2–3	Uzbekistan
Youlley 63' (pen.); Blackwood 90+3' (pen.)	Report	Abdukhalikov 29'; Ibrokhimov 40', 46'

Khalifa Sports City Stadium, Isa Town
Attendance: 58
Referee: Ammar Al-Jeneibi (United Arab Emirates)

21 October 2016
19:30

Uzbekistan	0–0	China
	Report

Khalifa Sports City Stadium, Isa Town
Attendance: 135
Referee: Jumpei Iida (Japan)
21 October 2016
19:30

Australia	0–0	Tajikistan
	Report

Bahrain National Stadium, Riffa
Attendance: 165
Referee: Khamis Al-Marri (Qatar)

== Knockout stage ==
In the knockout stage, extra time and penalty shoot-out are used to decide the winner if necessary.

=== Bracket ===
Quarter-finals
23 October – Riffa
Bahrain	0
Vietnam	1
24 October – Riffa
Japan	4
Tajikistan	0
23 October – Isa Town
Iraq	2 (5)
Saudi Arabia (p)	2 (6)
24 October – Isa Town
Uzbekistan	0
Iran	2

Semi-finals
27 October – Riffa
Vietnam	0
Japan	3
27 October – Isa Town
Saudi Arabia	6
Iran	5

Final
30 October – Riffa
Japan (p)	0 (5)
Saudi Arabia	0 (3)

=== Quarter-finals ===
Winners qualified for 2017 FIFA U-20 World Cup.

23 October 2016
16:15

Iraq	2–2 (a.e.t.)	Saudi Arabia
Hussein 75'; Fayyadh 79'	Report	Al-Shamlan 65'; A. Al-Yami 69'
Penalties
Habeeb (penalty missed); M. Kareem (penalty scored); Hussein (penalty scored); Fayyadh (penalty scored); Jalal (penalty scored); Abdulnabi (penalty scored); Hadi (penalty missed)	5–6	(penalty scored) Al-Dawsari; (penalty scored) Ghareeb; (penalty scored) A. Al-Yami; (penalty scored) Al-Amri; (penalty missed) Al-Najei; (penalty scored) Zabani; (penalty scored) Al-Saluli

Khalifa Sports City Stadium, Isa Town
Attendance: 338
Referee: Jumpei Iida (Japan)

23 October 2016
19:15

Bahrain	0–1	Vietnam
	Report	Trần Thành 72'

Bahrain National Stadium, Riffa
Attendance: 10,610
Referee: Khamis Al-Marri (Qatar)

24 October 2016
16:15

Japan	4–0	Tajikistan
Ogawa 8', 73'; Dōan 19'; Iwasaki 88'	Report

Bahrain National Stadium, Riffa
Attendance: 135
Referee: Fu Ming (China)

24 October 2016
19:15

Uzbekistan	0–2	Iran
	Report	Jafari 14', 47'

Khalifa Sports City Stadium, Isa Town
Attendance: 160
Referee: Muhammad Taqi (Singapore)

=== Semi-finals ===
27 October 2016
16:15

Saudi Arabia	6–5	Iran
Al-Najei 18' (pen.), 51'; Al-Khulaif 42'; A. Al-Yami 45+1', 64', 76'	Report	Jafari 45'; Aghasi 45+3'; Shekari 62'; Mehdikhani 75'; Karamolachaab 83'

Khalifa Sports City Stadium, Isa Town
Attendance: 1,200
Referee: Fu Ming (China)

27 October 2016
19:15

Vietnam	0–3	Japan
	Report	Kishimoto 6'; Nakamura 10', 51'

Bahrain National Stadium, Riffa
Attendance: 190
Referee: Jarred Gillett (Australia)

=== Final ===
30 October 2016
17:30

Japan	0–0 (a.e.t.)	Saudi Arabia
	Report
Penalties
Sakai (penalty scored); Dōan (penalty scored); Endo (penalty scored); Nakayama (penalty scored); Ogawa (penalty scored)	5–3	(penalty scored) Al-Dawsari; (penalty scored) Kariri; (penalty scored) A. Al-Yami; (penalty missed) Magrashi

Bahrain National Stadium, Riffa
Attendance: 3,460
Referee: Khamis Al-Marri (Qatar)

== Winners ==
AFC U-19 Championship 2016 winners

Japan
First title

== Awards ==
Most Valuable Player

- (Japan) Ritsu Dōan

Top Scorer

- (Saudi Arabia) Sami Al-Najei

Fair Play

- Japan

== Goalscorers ==
4 goals

- (Saudi Arabia) Sami Al-Najei
- (Saudi Arabia) Abdulrahman Al-Yami

3 goals

- (Iran) Reza Jafari
- (Iraq) Waleed Kareem Ali
- (Japan) Yuto Iwasaki
- (Japan) Koki Ogawa
- (Saudi Arabia) Rakan Al-Shamlan

2 goals

- (Bahrain) Mohammed Al-Hardan
- (Iran) Abolfazl Razzaghpour
- (Iraq) Mazin Fayyadh
- (Japan) Shunta Nakamura
- (Saudi Arabia) Ayman Al-Khulaif
- (South Korea) Cho Young-wook
- (Uzbekistan) Doston Ibrokhimov

1 goal

- (Australia) George Blackwood
- (Australia) Mario Shabow
- (Australia) Liam Youlley
- (Bahrain) Ahemd Bughammar
- (Bahrain) Sayed Ebrahim
- (Bahrain) Mohamed Marhoon
- (Bahrain) Ahmed Mohamed
- (Bahrain) Talal Al Naar
- (Iran) Aref Aghasi
- (Iran) Reza Karamolachaab
- (Iran) Mehdi Mehdikhani
- (Iran) Reza Shekari
- (Iraq) Sajad Hussein
- (Iraq) Alaa Abbas Abdulnabi
- (Japan) Ritsu Dōan
- (Japan) Teruki Hara
- (Japan) Takeru Kishimoto
- (Japan) Koji Miyoshi
- (Japan) Takehiro Tomiyasu
- (North Korea) Han Kwang-song
- (North Korea) Ryang Hyon-ju
- (Qatar) Abdulrasheed Umaru
- (Saudi Arabia) Abdulelah Al-Amri
- (Saudi Arabia) Abdulrahman Ghareeb
- (Saudi Arabia) Mansour Al-Muwallad
- (South Korea) Han Chan-hee
- (South Korea) Jeong Tae-wook
- (South Korea) Kang Ji-hoon
- (South Korea) Kim Geon-ung
- (Tajikistan) Nuriddin Hamroqulov
- (Tajikistan) Ehson Panjshanbe
- (Tajikistan) Karomatullo Saidov
- (Thailand) Anon Amornlerdsak
- (Thailand) Supachai Jaided
- (Thailand) Sittichok Phaso
- (United Arab Emirates) Faisal Al Matroushi
- (United Arab Emirates) Husain Abdulla Omar
- (United Arab Emirates) Ahmed Rashed
- (United Arab Emirates) Jassem Yaqoub
- (Uzbekistan) Bobur Abdukhalikov
- (Uzbekistan) Sayidjamol Davlatjonov
- (Uzbekistan) Jasurbek Yakhshiboev
- (Vietnam) Hà Đức Chinh
- (Vietnam) Hồ Minh Dĩ
- (Vietnam) Đoàn Văn Hậu
- (Vietnam) Trần Thành

1 own goal

- (Iran) Abolfazl Razzaghpour (against Qatar)

Source: the-afc.com
