= Kakeru Funaki =

Japanese footballer (born 1998)

Kakeru Funaki 舩木 翔
Personal information
- Full name: Kakeru Funaki
- Date of birth: 13 April 1998 (age 28)
- Place of birth: Ōji, Nara, Japan
- Height: 1.77 m (5 ft 10 in)
- Position: Left back

Team information
- Current team: Albirex Niigata
- Number: 77

Youth career
- 2008–2016: Cerezo Osaka

Senior career*
Years	Team	Apps	(Gls)
2016–2025	Cerezo Osaka	81	(3)
2016–2019	→ Cerezo Osaka U-23 (loan)	63	(2)
2020	→ Júbilo Iwata (loan)	6	(0)
2021	→ SC Sagamihara (loan)	17	(0)
2025–	Albirex Niigata	27	(0)

International career
2015–2016	Japan U-18 / U-19		
2017	Japan U-20	5	(0)
2019	Japan U-22	3	(0)
Medal record
Cerezo Osaka
Winner	J.League Cup	2017
Winner	Emperor's Cup	2017
Representing Japan
AFC U-19 Championship
Gold medal – first place	2016 Bahrain
- * Club domestic league appearances and goals as of 16 August 2026

Kakeru Funaki (舩木 翔, Funaki Kakeru; born April 13, 1998) is a Japanese professional footballer who plays as a left back for J1 League club, Albirex Niigata.

== Club career ==
=== Cerezo Osaka ===
Kakeru Funaki joined Cerezo Osaka in 2016. He made his debut against Yokohama F. Marinos in the J.League Cup on 15 March 2017. Funaki made his J1 league debut on 22 February 2019 against Vissel Kobe. During the training camp held in February 2022, he tried playing in center back, defensive midfielder and attacking midfielder, as the club already had two left backs in Yusuke Maruhashi and Ryosuke Yamanaka. Funaki scored his first league goal against Shimizu S-Pulse on 26 June 2022, scoring in the 76th minute.

=== Cerezo Osaka U-23s ===
Funaki made his Cerezo Osaka U-23s debut in the J3 League against Fujieda MYFC on 20 March 2016. He scored his first league goal against Giravanz Kitakyushu on 22 September 2018, scoring in the 41st minute.

=== Loan to Júbilo Iwata ===
On 29 December 2019, Funaki was announced at Júbilo Iwata on loan. He made his league debut against FC Ryukyu on 29 July 2020.

=== Loan to SC Sagamihara ===
On 8 January 2021, Funaki was announced at SC Sagamihara on loan. He made his league debut against Kyoto Sanga on 28 February 2021. On 12 January 2022, Funaki's loan expired and he returned to Cerezo Osaka.

== National team career ==
In May 2017, Funaki was selected in the Japan U-20 national team for the 2017 U-20 World Cup. At this tournament, he played 2 matches as a left back.

Funaki was initially called up to the Japan U21 squad for the 2018 Asian Games, but had to pull out due to injury, being replaced by Takuma Ominami.

== Career statistics ==
=== Club ===
As of match played 14 February 2025.

Appearances and goals by club, season and competition
Club	Season	League			Cup		League Cup		Continental		Total	
Club	Season	Division	Apps	Goals	Apps	Goals	Apps	Goals	Apps	Goals	Apps	Goals
Japan			League		Emperor's Cup		J.League Cup		AFC		Total	
Cerezo Osaka	2017	J1 League	0	0	1	0	5	0	–		6	0
Cerezo Osaka	2018	J1 League	0	0	0	0	0	0	2	0	2	0
Cerezo Osaka	2019	J1 League	5	0	2	0	7	1	–		14	1
Cerezo Osaka	2022	J1 League	14	2	2	1	7	2	–		24	5
Cerezo Osaka	2023	J1 League	23	0	3	0	4	0	–		30	0
Cerezo Osaka	2024	J1 League	30	1	2	0	4	0	–		36	1
Cerezo Osaka	2025	J1 League	1	0	0	0	0	0	–		1	0
Cerezo Osaka	Total		73	3	10	1	27	1	2	0	112	5
Cerezo Osaka U-23	2016	J3 League	5	0	–		–		–		5	0
Cerezo Osaka U-23	2017	J3 League	12	0	–		–		–		12	0
Cerezo Osaka U-23	2018	J3 League	30	2	–		–		–		30	2
Cerezo Osaka U-23	2019	J3 League	16	0	–		–		–		16	0
Cerezo Osaka U-23	Total		63	2	0	0	0	0	0	0	63	2
Júbilo Iwata (loan)	2020	J2 League	6	0	0	0	–		–		6	0
SC Sagamihara (loan)	2021	J2 League	17	0	1	0	–		–		18	0
Career total			159	5	11	1	27	1	2	0	199	7
