= Yao Wei =

Yao Wei may refer to:

- Yao Wei (footballer) (born 1997), Chinese footballer
- Yao Wei (dancer) (born 1984), Chinese dancer in the Royal Danish Ballet
