= Gao Haisheng =

Chinese footballer (born 1997)

Gao Haisheng 高海生
Personal information
- Full name: Gao Haisheng
- Date of birth: 6 January 1997 (age 29)
- Place of birth: Lu'an, Anhui, China
- Height: 1.83 m (6 ft 0 in)
- Positions: Left winger; attacking midfielder

Team information
- Current team: Ningbo FC
- Number: 19

Youth career
- Shanghai Luckystar
- 2014–2016: Shanghai SIPG

Senior career*
Years	Team	Apps	(Gls)
2017–2021	Shanghai SIPG	3	(0)
2020	→ Guizhou Hengfeng (loan)	11	(1)
2022	Zibo Cuju	11	(1)
2022	→ Dandong Tengyue (loan)	7	(1)
2023	Dandong Tengyue	26	(2)
2024–2025	Liaoning Tieren	44	(1)
2026–	Ningbo FC	0	(0)

International career^{‡}
2015–2016	China U-20	16	(3)
2017	China U-23	6	(0)
- * Club domestic league appearances and goals as of 31 January 2026 ‡ National team caps and goals as of 10 November 2017

Gao Haisheng (Chinese: 高海生; pinyin: Gāo Hǎishēng; born 6 January 1997) is a Chinese footballer who currently plays for Ningbo FC in the China League One.

== Club career ==
Gao Haisheng joined Chinese Super League side Shanghai SIPG's youth academy in November 2014 when Shanghai SIPG bought Shanghai Luckystar's youth team. He was promoted to the first team squad by André Villas-Boas in the 2017 season. On 15 July 2017, Gao made his senior debut in a 3–1 away win against Yanbian Funde. On 11 May 2018, Gao was involved in a car accident while drunk driving. He received an administrative detention on suspicion of dangerous driving. He was excluded from the first team squad in July 2018.

On January 30, 2024, Liaoning Tieren officially announced that Gao Haisheng had joined the team. He made his debut in a league game against Chongqing Tonglianglong on March 09, 2024 in a 1-0 defeat. On 26 October 2025, after a 1–0 victory over Nantong Zhiyun, Liaoning Tieren were promoted to the 2026 Chinese Super League for the first time in their history, being crowned the 2025 China League One champions in the process.

On 27 February 2026, Gao joined China League One club Ningbo FC.

== Career statistics ==
As of 31 January 2026.

Appearances and goals by club, season and competition
Club	Season	League			National Cup		Continental		Other		Total	
Club	Season	Division	Apps	Goals	Apps	Goals	Apps	Goals	Apps	Goals	Apps	Goals
Shanghai SIPG	2017	Chinese Super League	1	0	0	0	0	0	-		1	0
Shanghai SIPG	2018	Chinese Super League	2	0	0	0	0	0	-		2	0
Shanghai SIPG	2019	Chinese Super League	0	0	0	0	0	0	0 (Note: Appearances in Chinese FA Super Cup)	0	0	0
Shanghai SIPG	2021	Chinese Super League	0	0	0	0	1	0	-		1	0
Shanghai SIPG	Total		3	0	0	0	1	0	0	0	4	0
Guizhou Hengfeng (loan)	2020	China League One	11	0	1	0	-		-		12	1
Zibo Cuju	2022	China League One	11	1	0	0	-		-		11	1
Dandong Tengyue (loan)	2022	China League Two	7	1	1	1	-		-		8	2
Dandong Tengyue	2023	China League One	26	2	2	0	-		-		28	2
Liaoning Tieren	2024	China League One	27	0	0	0	-		-		27	0
Liaoning Tieren	2025	China League One	17	1	2	0	-		-		19	1
Liaoning Tieren	Total		44	1	2	0	0	0	0	0	46	1
Career total			102	5	6	1	1	0	0	0	109	6

== Honours ==
=== Club ===
Shanghai SIPG

- Chinese Super League: 2018

Liaoning Tieren

- China League One: 2025
