= Trần Thành =

Vietnamese footballer

Personal information
- Full name: Trần Thành
- Date of birth: 2 February 1997 (age 29)
- Place of birth: Hương Thủy, Thừa Thiên Huế, Vietnam
- Height: 1.77 m (5 ft 10 in)
- Position: Forward

Team information
- Current team: Đồng Tháp
- Number: 29

Youth career
- 2010–2015: Huế

Senior career*
Years	Team	Apps	(Gls)
2016–2022	Huế	102	(32)
2023	Quảng Nam	7	(2)
2023–2024	Huế	20	(2)
2024–	Đồng Tháp	16	(1)

International career^{‡}
2016–2017	Vietnam U19	12	(5)
2017–2018	Vietnam U20	3	(0)
Medal record
Representing Vietnam
AFC U-19 Championship
Third place	2016 Brahrain
AFF U-19 Youth Championship
Third place	2016 Vietnam
- * Club domestic league appearances and goals as of 6 June 2026 ‡ National team caps and goals as of 25 April 2018

Trần Thành (born 2 February 1997) is a Vietnamese professional footballer who plays as a forward for V.League 2 club Đồng Tháp.

Trần Thành began his senior club career playing for Huế, where he made his debut at age 18 in 2016. In 2023, he joined fellow V.League 2 side Quảng Nam on a free transfer.

Trần Thành is a youth international for Vietnam. He represented the Vietnam U20s at the 2017 FIFA U-20 World Cup.

== International career ==
On 23 October 2016, he scored the only goal to help Vietnam U19 beat Bahrain in the quarter-finals of the 2016 AFC U-19 Championship to enter the semi-finals of the continental tournament. Also earning tickets to the 2017 FIFA U-20 World Cup in South Korea. This is also the first time an 11-a-side football team of Vietnam participated in a World Cup tournament of FIFA.

=== International goals ===
Vietnam U19

#	Date	Venue	Opponent	Score	Result	Competition
1	23 October 2016	Bahrain National Stadium, Riffa, Bahrain	Bahrain	1–0	1–0	2016 AFC U-19 Championship

== Honours ==
Quảng Nam

- V.League 2: 2023

Vietnam U19

- AFC U-19 Championship third place: 2016
- AFF U-19 Youth Championship third place: 2016
