= Nguyễn Trọng Đại =

Vietnamese footballer

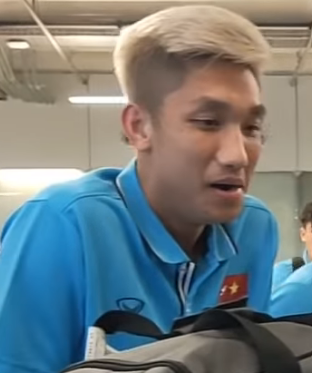
- Trọng Đại in 2020

Personal information
- Full name: Nguyễn Trọng Đại
- Date of birth: 7 April 1997 (age 29)
- Place of birth: Cẩm Giàng, Hải Dương, Vietnam
- Height: 1.84 m (6 ft 0 in)
- Positions: Defensive midfielder; center-back

Youth career
- 2009–2014: Viettel

Senior career*
Years	Team	Apps	(Gls)
2015–2022	Viettel	71	(5)
2022	Hồng Lĩnh Hà Tĩnh	12	(0)
2023	Thép Xanh Nam Định	7	(0)
2024	Hải Phòng	2	(0)
2025	Gia Định	7	(0)
2025–2026	Long An	13	(1)

International career^{‡}
2016–2017	Vietnam U20	18	(2)
2018–2020	Vietnam U23	3	(0)
Medal record
Men's football
Representing Vietnam
AFC U-23 Championship
Runner-up	2018 China	Team
- * Club domestic league appearances and goals as of 6 June 2026 ‡ National team caps and goals as of 08 September 2019

Nguyễn Trọng Đại (born 7 April 1997) is a Vietnamese professional footballer who plays as a defensive midfielder or center-back.

== Club career ==
A product of Viettel football academy, Trọng Đại captained the team in several youth categories, before being promoted to the first team in 2015, at the age of 18. He was part of the team that won the 2020, but didn't have much game time. In the following season, he appeared regularly for the team, taking part of 5 out of 6 games in the 2021 AFC Champions League group stage. However, due to attitude problems, his contract with Viettel was not renewed after it expired at the end of the 2021 season. Trọng Đại then had short spells at other V.League 1 clubs, including Hồng Lĩnh Hà Tĩnh, Thép Xanh Nam Định and Hải Phòng, but only remained at each team for one season.

== International career ==
Trọng Đại captained Vietnam U19 in the 2016 AFC U-19 Championship, a historical tournament for Vietnam as they reached the semi-finals and qualified for the 2017 FIFA U-20 World Cup. In the U-20 World Cup, he was named vice-captain, behind Nguyễn Quang Hải.

In 2018, Trọng Đại featured in Vietnam U23's squad for the AFC U-23 Championship but didn't appear a single minute as the team finish runners-up.

== Honours ==
Viettel

- V.League 1: 2020
- V.League 2: 2018

Vietnam U19

- KBZ Bank Cup: 2016

Vietnam U23

- AFC U-23 Championship runners-up: 2018
