= Sayed Issa =

Qatari footballer (born 1997)

Personal information
- Full name: Sayed Hassan Issa
- Date of birth: 14 September 1997 (age 29)
- Place of birth: Egypt
- Position: Defender

Team information
- Current team: Umm Salal
- Number: 4

Youth career
- Lekhwiya

Senior career*
Years	Team	Apps	(Gls)
2016–2017	Lekhwiya	2	(0)
2017–2020	Al-Khor	5	(0)
2020–2021	Al-Sailiya	0	(0)
2021–	Umm Salal	44	(1)

International career
2016	Qatar U19	3	(0)
- * Club domestic league appearances and goals as of 17 January 2026

Sayed Hassan Issa (Arabic:سيد حسن عيسى) (born 14 September 1997) is a professional footballer who currently plays for Umm Salal. Born in Egypt, he has represented Qatar at youth level.

== Career statistics ==
=== Club ===
As of 1 June 2019.

Club	Season	League			Cup		Continental		Other		Total	
Club	Season	Division	Apps	Goals	Apps	Goals	Apps	Goals	Apps	Goals	Apps	Goals
Al-Khor	2017–18	Qatar Stars League	5	0	3 (Note: Appearances in the Qatar Cup)	0	0	0	0	0	8	0
Al-Khor	2018–19	Qatar Stars League	0	0	2	0	0	0	0	0	2	0
Career total			5	0	5	0	0	0	0	0	10	0
