= Huang Chuang (footballer) =

Chinese association football player

Personal information
- Date of birth: 2 January 1997 (age 29)
- Place of birth: Wuhan, Hubei, China
- Height: 1.85 m (6 ft 1 in)
- Position: Defender

Youth career
- 2013–2015: Wuhan
- 2015–2017: Gondomar

Senior career*
Years	Team	Apps	(Gls)
2017–2019	Gondomar	2	(0)
2017	→ Tianjin TEDA (loan)	0	(0)
2019–2022	Henan Songshan Longmen	3	(0)
2023	Hubei Istar	14	(0)
2024	Guangxi Hengchen	15	(0)

International career^{‡}
2016	China U19	2	(0)
2019	China U23	3	(0)
- * Club domestic league appearances and goals as of 14:01, 31 December 2020 (UTC) ‡ National team caps and goals as of 14:01, 5 March 2020 (UTC)

Huang Chuang (simplified Chinese: 黄闯; traditional Chinese: 黃闖; pinyin: Huáng Chuǎng; born 2 January 1997) is a Chinese footballer who plays as a defender.

== Club career ==
As a youth Huang Chuang was selected to train with Portuguese football club Gondomar as part of a Chinese Football Association sponsored youth development program. He would remain with the club and was promoted to their senior team where he would make his debut on 18 December 2016 in a league game against C.D. Cinfães in a 1-0 victory.

== Career statistics ==
As of 31 December 2020.

Club	Season	League			National Cup		Continental		Other		Total	
Club	Season	Division	Apps	Goals	Apps	Goals	Apps	Goals	Apps	Goals	Apps	Goals
Gondomar	2016–17	Campeonato de Portugal	2	0	0	0	–		–		2	0
Gondomar	2017–18	Campeonato de Portugal	0	0	0	0	–		–		0	0
Gondomar	2018–19	Campeonato de Portugal	0	0	0	0	–		–		0	0
Gondomar	Total		2	0	0	0	0	0	0	0	2	0
Tianjin TEDA (loan)	2017	Chinese Super League	0	0	0	0	–		–		0	0
Henan Jianye	2019	Chinese Super League	0	0	1	0	–		–		1	0
Henan Jianye	2020	Chinese Super League	3	0	1	0	–		–		4	0
Henan Jianye	Total		3	0	2	0	0	0	0	0	5	0
Career total			5	0	2	0	0	0	0	0	7	0
