= Hồ Minh Dĩ =

Vietnamese footballer (born 1998)

Personal information
- Full name: Hồ Minh Dĩ
- Date of birth: February 17, 1998 (age 28)
- Place of birth: Hải Lăng, Quảng Trị, Vietnam
- Height: 1.60 m (5 ft 3 in)
- Position: Winger

Team information
- Current team: Hải Phòng
- Number: 11

Youth career
- 2009–2015: PVF Academy

Senior career*
Years	Team	Apps	(Gls)
2017–2022	Hà Nội	21	(2)
2022	→ Quảng Nam (loan)	19	(2)
2023–	Hải Phòng	69	(3)

International career^{‡}
2015–2018	Vietnam U19	23	(6)
- * Club domestic league appearances and goals as of 7 June 2026 ‡ National team caps and goals as of 22 May 2017

Hồ Minh Dĩ (born 17 February 1998) is a Vietnamese professional footballer who plays as a winger for V.League 1 club Hải Phòng

== Honours ==
Hà Nội

- V.League 1: 2018, 2019; Runner-up: 2020
- Vietnamese National Cup: 2019, 2020
- Vietnamese Super Cup: 2019, 2020, 2021

Vietnam U19

- AFF U-19 Youth Championship Third place : 2016
- AFC U-19 Championship Third place : 2016

== International career ==
=== International goals ===
==== U-19 ====
#	Date	Venue	Opponent	Score	Result	Competition
1	29 August 2015	Vientiane, Laos	Singapore	2–0	6-0	2015 AFF U-19 Youth Championship
2	2 September 2015	Vientiane, Laos	Laos	1–0	4-0	2015 AFF U-19 Youth Championship
3	2 October 2015	Yangon, Myanmar	Brunei	1–0	5-0	2016 AFC U-19 Championship qualification
4	2 October 2015	Yangon, Myanmar	Brunei	5–0	5-0	2016 AFC U-19 Championship qualification
5	22 September 2016	Hanoi, Vietnam	Australia	1–4	2-5	2016 AFF U-19 Youth Championship
6	17 October 2016	Isa Town, Qatar	United Arab Emirates	1–0	1–1	2016 AFC U-19 Championship
