= Sirimongkhon Jitbanjong =

Thai footballer

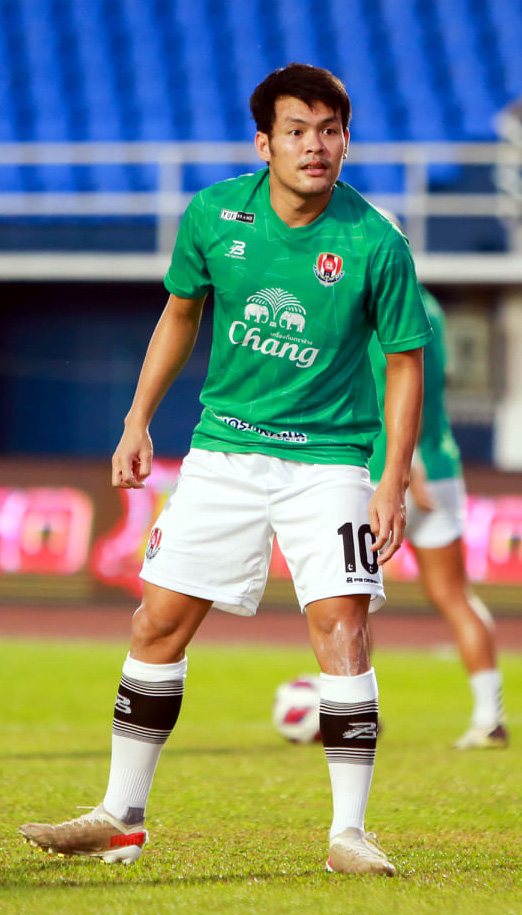

Personal information
- Full name: Sirimongkhon Jitbanjong
- Date of birth: 8 August 1997 (age 29)
- Place of birth: Khon Kaen, Thailand
- Height: 1.64 m (5 ft 4 1/2 in)
- Positions: Winger; attacking midfielder

Team information
- Current team: Marines
- Number: 80

Youth career
- 2012–2014: Khon Kaen Sport School

Senior career*
Years	Team	Apps	(Gls)
2014–2022	Suphanburi	64	(3)
2015	→ Simork (loan)	6	(0)
2016	→ Khon Kaen United (loan)	2	(0)
2016	→ Simork (loan)	3	(1)
2022	→ Navy (loan)	13	(2)
2022–2024	Navy	32	(2)
2025–	Marines	10	(2)

International career^{‡}
2015–2016	Thailand U19	9	(1)
2017–2018	Thailand U21	3	(0)
2018	Thailand U23	3	(0)
- * Club domestic league appearances and goals as of 18 March 2023 ‡ National team caps and goals as of 17 July 2018

Sirimongkhon Jitbanjong (Thai: ศิริมงคล จิตบรรจง, born August 8, 1997) is a Thai professional footballer who plays as a winger or an attacking midfielder for Thai League 3 club Marines.

== International career ==
He also represents for Thailand U-19 national football team in 2016 AFC U-19 Championship qualification.
