= Afam Akram =

Sri Lankan international footballer

Personal information
- Full name: Mohamed Afam Akram
- Date of birth: 11 June 1998 (age 28)
- Place of birth: Colombo, Sri Lanka
- Position: Forward

Senior career*
Years	Team	Apps	(Gls)
2015–2016	Java Lane		
2016–	Renown		

International career^{‡}
2015	Sri Lanka U19	3	(2)
2016–	Sri Lanka	1	(0)
- * Club domestic league appearances and goals as of 20:38, 4 June 2017 (UTC) ‡ National team caps and goals as of 20:38, 4 June 2017 (UTC)

Mohamed Afam Akram (Tamil: அபாம் அக்ரம்; Sinhala:අෆාම් අක්‍රම්ගේ; born 11 June 1998) is a Sri Lankan international footballer who plays as a forward for Renown SC.

== International career ==
Akram made his senior international debut in a 4–0 away defeat to Cambodia. He came on at half time for Subash Madhushan, but was replaced after only 62 minutes by Rathnayake Nawarathna Warakagoda due to injury.

== International statistics ==
As of match played 31 May 2017.

National team	Year	Apps	Goals
Sri Lanka	2016	1	0
Sri Lanka	2017	0	0
Total		1	0
