= Jorge Marcelo Vitorino =

Macanese footballer

Vitorino
Personal information
- Full name: Jorge Marcelo Vitorino
- Date of birth: 7 October 1999 (age 27)
- Place of birth: Sé, Macau
- Position: Forward

Team information
- Current team: Lun Lok

Senior career*
Years	Team	Apps	(Gls)
2017–2019	MFA Development		
2020–	Lun Lok	5	(3)

International career^{‡}
2016–2018	Macau U19	6	(1)
2018–	Macau	1	(0)
- * Club domestic league appearances and goals as of 19:12, 13 March 2021 (UTC) ‡ National team caps and goals as of 19:12, 13 March 2021 (UTC)

Jorge Marcelo Vitorino (born 7 October 1999) is a Macanese footballer who currently plays as a forward for Lun Lok.

== Career statistics ==
=== Club ===
As of 13 March 2021.

Club	Season	League			Cup		Continental		Other		Total	
Club	Season	Division	Apps	Goals	Apps	Goals	Apps	Goals	Apps	Goals	Apps	Goals
MFA Development	2017	Liga de Elite	14	0	0	0	–		0	0	14	0
MFA Development	2019	Liga de Elite	4	0	0	0	–		0	0	4	0
MFA Development	Total		18	0	0	0	0	0	0	0	18	0
Lun Lok	2020	Liga de Elite	4	3	0	0	–		0	0	4	3
Lun Lok	2021	Liga de Elite	1	0	0	0	–		0	0	1	0
Lun Lok	Total		5	3	0	0	0	0	0	0	5	3
Career total			23	3	0	0	0	0	0	0	23	3

=== International ===
As of matches played 14 September 2018.

National team	Year	Apps	Goals
Macau	2018	1	0
Total		1	0
