= Kim Si-woo (footballer) =

South Korean footballer (born 1997)

Personal information
- Full name: Kim Si-woo
- Date of birth: 26 June 1997 (age 29)
- Place of birth: South Korea
- Position: Forward

Team information
- Current team: Gwangju FC
- Number: 27

Senior career*
Years	Team	Apps	(Gls)
2017–	Gwangju FC	3	(0)
- * Club domestic league appearances and goals as of 3 November 2018

Kim Si-woo (born 26 June 1997) is a South Korean footballer who plays for Gwangju FC.
