= Sajad Hussein =

Iraqi footballer

Sajjad Hussein Abed
Personal information
- Date of birth: 9 September 1998 (age 28)
- Position: Forward

Team information
- Current team: Amanat Baghdad

Senior career*
Years	Team	Apps	(Gls)
- Al-Zawraa
- Naft Al-Basra SC
- Amanat Baghdad

International career^{‡}
2012–2013	Iraq U17		
2016	Iraq U20	0	(0)
2017–	Iraq	1	(0)
- * Club domestic league appearances and goals as of 13 November 2017 ‡ National team caps and goals as of 13 November 2017

Sajjad Hussein Abed (born 9 September 1998) is an Iraqi footballer who plays as an attacker for Amanat Baghdad in Iraq Premier League.

== International career ==
On 13 November 2017, Hussein made his first international cap with Iraq against Syria in a friendly match.
