= Reza Karamolachaab =

Iranian footballer

Reza Karmollachaab
Personal information
- Full name: Reza Karmollachaab
- Date of birth: July 12, 1997 (age 29)
- Place of birth: Shoushtar, Iran
- Height: 1.82 m (6 ft 0 in)
- Position: Forward

Team information
- Current team: Van Pars
- Number: 44

Youth career
- 2009–2014: Foolad
- 2014–2015: Naft Masjed Soleyman

Senior career*
| Years | Team | Apps | (Gls) |
| 2014–2015 | Naft Masjed Soleyman | 9 | (1) |
| 2016 | Mafra | 0 | (0) |
| 2016–2018 | Persepolis | 2 | (0) |
| 2017–2018 | → Esteghlal Khuzestan (loan) | 11 | (2) |
| 2018–2019 | KPV | 18 | (4) |
| 2019–2020 | Malavan | 1 | (0) |
| 2021–2022 | Esteghlal Mollasani | 10 | (4) |
| 2022 | Paddideh | 8 | (0) |
| 2022 | Chooka Talesh F.C. | 5 | (2) |
| 2022 | Van Pars Nasghshe Jahan | 0 | (0) |

International career^{‡}
| 2009–2010 | Iran U15 | 27 | (24) |
| 2011–2013 | Iran U17 | 20 | (23) |
| 2014–2017 | Iran U20 | 9 | (19) |
| 2015–2021 | Iran U23 | 8 | (7) |
- * Club domestic league appearances and goals as of 11 February 2022 ‡ National team caps and goals as of 15 December 2016

Reza Karmollachaab (Persian: رضا کرملاچعب) is an Iranian professional footballer who plays for Iranian club Van Pars as a centre forward.

== Foolad ==
Karmollachaab started his career with Foolad academy. He was part of Foolad U19 during the 2013–14 season.

== Naft Masjed Soleyman ==
=== 2014–15 ===
In the summer of 2014, he joined the training camp of Persian Gulf Pro League club Naft Masjed Soleyman and signed with the first team at the age of 17. He made his debut for Naft Masjed Soleyman on 25 September 2014 against Rah Ahan as a substitute for Milad Jafari. Karmollachaab scored his first senior goal on 11 March 2015 in a 2–2 draw against Persepolis after coming on as a substitute in the 83rd minute.

== Mafra ==
On 28 January 2016, Karmollachaab joined the Portuguese Segunda Liga club Mafra. He was previously linked to Vitória de Setúbal and Sporting CP, but chose to join Mafra for more playing time. Karamollachaab left Mafra at the end of the season after not playing a single minute because of ITC issues.

== Persepolis ==
After Karmollachaab departed from Mafra, he signed with Persian Gulf Pro League side Persepolis in June 2016.

== International career ==
=== Youth ===
Karmollachaab scored five goals for the Iran national under-20 football team during 2016 AFC U-19 Championship qualification.

== Club career statistics ==
As of 1 June 2019

| Club | Division | Season | League | | Cup | | Other | | Total | |
| Club | Division | Season | Apps | Goals | Apps | Goals | Apps | Goals | Apps | Goals |
|---|---|---|---|---|---|---|---|---|---|---|
| Naft MIS | Persian Gulf Pro League | 2014–15 | 9 | 1 | 0 | 0 | — | | 9 | 1 |
| Mafra | LigaPro | 2015–16 | 0 | 0 | 0 | 0 | — | | 0 | 0 |
| Persepolis | Persian Gulf Pro League | 2016–17 | 2 | 0 | 0 | 0 | — | | 2 | 0 |
| Persepolis | Persian Gulf Pro League | 2017–18 | 0 | 0 | 0 | 0 | — | | 0 | 0 |
| Persepolis | Total | | 2 | 0 | 0 | 0 | — | | 2 | 0 |
| Esteghlal Khuzestan | Persian Gulf Pro League | 2017–18 | 10 | 2 | 1 | 0 | — | | 11 | 2 |
| KPV | Ykkönen | 2018 | 17 | 4 | 0 | 0 | 1 | 0 | 18 | 4 |
| Career total | | | 38 | 7 | 1 | 0 | 1 | 0 | 40 | 7 |

== Honours ==
Persepolis

- Persian Gulf Pro League (2): 2016–17, 2017–18
