= Gao Huaze =

Chinese footballer (born 1997)

Gao Huaze 高华泽
Personal information
- Date of birth: 20 October 1997 (age 29)
- Place of birth: Jingzhou, Hubei, China
- Height: 1.78 m (5 ft 10 in)
- Position: Forward

Team information
- Current team: Guangdong GZ-Power
- Number: 27

Youth career
- 2008–2015: Hangzhou Greentown

Senior career*
Years	Team	Apps	(Gls)
2016–2017	Hangzhou Greentown	12	(2)
2018–2022	Hebei FC	72	(6)
2023–2024	Tianjin Jinmen Tiger	13	(0)
2025	Shijiazhuang Gongfu	29	(4)
2026–	Guangdong GZ-Power	0	(0)

International career^{‡}
2015–2016	China U19	26	(7)
2018	China U21	8	(0)
- * Club domestic league appearances and goals as of 31 December 2022 ‡ National team caps and goals as of 15 November 2018

Gao Huaze (Chinese: 高华泽; pinyin: Gāo Huázé; born 20 October 1997) is a Chinese footballer who currently plays for China League One side Guangdong GZ-Power.

== Club career ==
Gao Huaze joined Chinese Super League side Hangzhou Greentown's youth academy in 2008. He made a brief trial with Serie A side ChievoVerona in December 2015. Gao was promoted to Hangzhou Greentown's first team squad in 2016. He didn't play for the club in the 2016 season as Hangzhou Greentown struggled at the bottom of the league and relegated to the second tier. On 12 March 2017, he made his senior debut in a 3–2 home win over Nei Mongol Zhongyou. He scored his first senior goal on 6 May 2017 in a 3–2 away win against Beijing Enterprises. He scored the second goal of the season on 11 June 2017 in a 1–1 home draw against Shijiazhuang Ever Bright. Gao made 12 appearances and scored two goals in the first 18 matches of 2017 season. He absented the rest of the season for the 2017 National Games of China.

Gao transferred to Chinese Super League side Hebei China Fortune on 28 February 2018. On 11 March 2018, he made his debut for the club in a 3–2 away win over Guizhou Hengfeng, coming on as a substitute for Xu Tianyuan in the 92nd minute. On 2 August 2018, he scored his first goal for the club in a 6–3 away defeat against Beijing Sinobo Guoan. At the end of the 2022 Chinese Super League season, Hebei were relegated. On 30 March 2023, the club announced that it had dissolved due to financial difficulties. On 4 April 2023 he transferred to fellow top tier club Tianjin Jinmen Tiger.

== Career statistics ==
As of match played 31 December 2025.

Appearances and goals by club, season and competition
Club	Season	League			National Cup		Continental		Other		Total	
Club	Season	Division	Apps	Goals	Apps	Goals	Apps	Goals	Apps	Goals	Apps	Goals
Hangzhou Greentown	2016	Chinese Super League	0	0	0	0	–		–		0	0
Hangzhou Greentown	2017	China League One	12	2	3	0	–		–		15	2
Hangzhou Greentown	Total		12	2	3	0	0	0	0	0	15	0
Hebei China Fortune	2018	Chinese Super League	16	2	2	0	–		–		18	2
Hebei China Fortune	2019	Chinese Super League	8	0	1	0	–		–		9	0
Hebei China Fortune	2020	Chinese Super League	11	1	1	0	–		–		12	1
Hebei China Fortune	2021	Chinese Super League	5	0	1	0	–		–		6	0
Hebei China Fortune	2022	Chinese Super League	32	3	0	0	–		–		32	3
Hebei China Fortune	Total		72	6	5	0	0	0	0	0	77	6
Tianjin Jinmen Tiger	2023	Chinese Super League	7	0	1	0	–		–		8	0
Tianjin Jinmen Tiger	2024	Chinese Super League	6	0	3	0	–		–		9	0
Tianjin Jinmen Tiger	Total		13	0	4	0	0	0	0	0	17	0
Shijiazhuang Gongfu	2025	China League One	29	4	1	0	–		–		30	4
Career total			126	12	13	0	0	0	0	0	139	12

== Honours ==
=== Club ===
Guangdong GZ-Power

- China League One: 2026
