= Mohammad Abu Loum =

Jordanian football referee

- Full name: Mohammad Mousa Abu Loum
- Born: 28 October 1973 (age 52); Jordan

International
| Years | League | Role |
| 2005- | FIFA | Referee |

Mohammad Abu Loum (born 28 October 1973) is a Jordanian football referee who has been a full international referee for FIFA.

Abu Loum became a FIFA referee in 2005. He has served as a referee in competitions including the 2014 FIFA World Cup qualifiers, beginning with the opening-round match between Bangladesh and Pakistan.
