= Yuto Iwasaki =

Japanese footballer (born 1998)

Yuto Iwasaki 岩崎 悠人
Personal information
- Date of birth: 11 June 1998 (age 28)
- Place of birth: Hikone, Shiga, Japan
- Height: 1.73 m (5 ft 8 in)
- Positions: Winger; forward

Team information
- Current team: V-Varen Nagasaki
- Number: 8

Youth career
- Kaneshiro JFC
- JFA Academy Fukushima
- Hikone Chuo Junior High School
- 2014–2016: Kyoto Tachibana High School

Senior career*
Years	Team	Apps	(Gls)
2017–2018	Kyoto Sanga FC	68	(3)
2019–2022	Hokkaido Consadole Sapporo	8	(0)
2020	→ Shonan Bellmare (loan)	16	(0)
2021	→ JEF United Chiba (loan)	16	(0)
2021–2022	→ Sagan Tosu (loan)	45	(3)
2023	Sagan Tosu	31	(0)
2024–2025	Avispa Fukuoka	72	(2)
2026–	V-Varen Nagasaki	12	(1)

International career^{‡}
2015	Japan U-17	1	(0)
2015	Japan U-18		
2016	Japan U-19	5	(3)
2017	Japan U-20	6	(1)
2019	Japan U-22	4	(2)
2018–2019	Japan U-23	11	(4)
2022–	Japan	1	(0)
Medal record
Men's football
Representing Japan
Asian Games
Silver medal – second place	2018 Jakarta-Palembang	Team
EAFF Championship
Winner	2022 Japan	Team
AFC U-19 Championship
Gold medal – first place	2016 Bahrain
- * Club domestic league appearances and goals as of 22:19, 5 August 2026 (UTC) ‡ National team caps and goals as of 19 July 2022

Yuto Iwasaki (岩崎 悠人, Iwasaki Yuto; born 11 June 1998) is a Japanese professional footballer who plays as a winger or a forward for J1 League club V-Varen Nagasaki and the Japan national team.

== Youth career ==
Iwasaki started with junior sides Kaneshiro JFC and JFA Academy Fukushima, before enrolling at the Hikone City Chuo Junior High School and later, Kyoto Tachibana High School.

== Club career ==
=== Kyoto Sanga ===
In August 2016, it was announced that Iwasaki would sign for Kyoto Sanga. He made an assist on his debut against Montedio Yamagata. Iwasaki scored his first league goal against Oita Trinita on 29 April 2017, scoring in the 70th minute.

=== Hokkaido Consadole Sapporo ===
Iwasaki made his league debut against Nagoya Grampus on 30 March 2019.

=== Loan to Shonan Bellmare ===
On 30 December 2019, Iwasaki was announced at Shonan Bellmare. He made his league debut against Urawa Red Diamonds on 21 February 2020.

=== Loan to JEF United Chiba ===
Iwasaki was announced at JEF United Chiba. He made his league debut against Ventforet Kofu on 28 February 2021.

=== Loan to Sagan Tosu ===
On 12 August 2021, Iwasaki was announced at Sagan Tosu. He made his league debut against Urawa Red Diamonds on 14 August 2021. Iwasaki scored his first league goal against Kawasaki Frontale on 7 November 2021, scoring in the 3rd minute.

=== Sagan Tosu ===
On 14 December 2022, Iwasaki was announced at Sagan Tosu. He made his league debut against Shonan Bellmare on 18 February 2023.

=== Avispa Fukuoka ===
On 29 December 2023, Iwasaki was announced at Avispa Fukuoka. He made his league debut against Hokkaido Consadole Sapporo on 24 February 2024. On 25 May 2024, Iwasaki achieved his 200th J League appearance after playing against Albirex Niigata.

=== V-Varen Nagasaki ===
In December 2025, Iwasaki transferred to newly-promoted J1 League club V-Varen Nagasaki.

== National team career ==
In May 2017, Iwasaki was selected in the Japan U-20 national team for the 2017 U-20 World Cup. At this tournament, he played all 4 matches.

On 26 December 2017, Iwasaki was called up to the squad for the Under 23 AFC Asian Cup.

On 17 July 2022, Iwasaki was called up to the Japan squad to replace Yoshinori Muto. He made his debut against Hong Kong on 19 July 2022.

== Career statistics ==
=== Club ===
As of 5 August 2026

Appearances and goals by club, season and competition
Club	Season	League			National cup (Note: Includes Emperors Cup)		League cup (Note: Includes J.League Cup)		Total	
Club	Season	Division	Apps	Goals	Apps	Goals	Apps	Goals	Apps	Goals
Kyoto Sanga	2017	J2 League	35	2	1	0	–		36	2
Kyoto Sanga	2018	J2 League	33	1	1	0	–		34	1
Kyoto Sanga	Total		68	3	2	0	0	0	70	3
Hokkaido Consadole Sapporo	2019	J1 League	8	0	1	0	10	0	19	0
Shonan Bellmare (loan)	2020	J1 League	16	0	–		3	0	19	0
JEF United Chiba (loan)	2021	J2 League	16	0	1	0	–		17	0
Sagan Tosu (loan)	2021	J1 League	13	1	0	0	0	0	13	1
Sagan Tosu (loan)	2022	J1 League	32	2	1	0	2	1	35	3
Sagan Tosu (loan)	Total		45	3	1	0	2	1	48	4
Sagan Tosu	2023	J1 League	31	0	1	0	2	0	34	0
Avispa Fukuoka	2024	J1 League	38	1	2	0	2	0	42	1
Avispa Fukuoka	2025	J1 League	34	1	3	0	4	0	41	1
Avispa Fukuoka	Total		72	2	5	0	6	0	83	2
V-Varen Nagasaki	2026	J1 (100)	12	1	–		–		12	1
Career total			268	9	11	0	23	1	302	10

== Honours ==
=== International ===
- EAFF Championship: 2022

Japan U-19

- AFC U-19 Championship 2016
