= Jassim Yaqoob =

Emirati footballer (born 1997)

Personal information
- Full name: Jassim Yaqoob Salman Al-Blooshi
- Date of birth: 16 March 1997 (age 29)
- Place of birth: Sharjah, United Arab Emirates
- Position: Winger

Youth career
- Al Nasr

Senior career*
Years	Team	Apps	(Gls)
2015–2024	Al Nasr	118	(9)
2021–2022	→ Khor Fakkan (loan)	17	(1)
2023–2024	→ Hatta (loan)	6	(0)

International career
2016	United Arab Emirates U-19	3	(1)
2018–	United Arab Emirates U-23	2	(0)
2017–2019	United Arab Emirates	10	(1)
- * Club domestic league appearances and goals

Jassim Yaqoob (Arabic:جاسم يعقوب) (born 16 March 1997) is an Emirati professional footballer who plays as a winger.

Yaqoob made his international debut for the United Arab Emirates against Haiti in November 2017. He scored his first international goal against the Dominican Republic in August 2019.
