= Karomatullo Saidov =

Tajikistani footballer

Personal information
- Date of birth: 12 October 1999 (age 27)
- Place of birth: Qurghonteppa, Tajikistan
- Position: Midfielder

Team information
- Current team: Khujand

Senior career*
Years	Team	Apps	(Gls)
2017	Barkchi		
2018	Khujand		
2018–2019	Khatlon		
2019	Kuktosh		
2020–2021	Khatlon	13	(2)
2021	Ravshan Kulob		
2021–2022	Khujand		
2023–	Khujand		

International career^{‡}
2018–	Tajikistan	7	(0)
- * Club domestic league appearances and goals as of 12:04, 9 October 2020 (UTC) ‡ National team caps and goals as of 20:34, 10 July 2019 (UTC)

Karomatullo Saidov (born 12 October 1999) is a Tajikistani professional football player who currently plays for Khujand.

== Career ==
=== International ===
Saidov made his senior team debut on 13 December 2018 against Oman.

== Career statistics ==
=== International ===
Tajikistan national team
Year	Apps	Goals
2018	3	0
2019	3	0
Total	6	0

Statistics accurate as of match played 10 July 2019
