= Ahmed Rashed (footballer, born 1997) =

Emirati footballer (born 1997)

Personal information
- Full name: Ahmed Rashed Sultan Al-Khabail Al-Mehrzi
- Date of birth: 19 January 1997 (age 29)
- Place of birth: Al Fujairah, United Arab Emirates
- Height: 1.81 m (5 ft 11 1/2 in)
- Position: Defender

Youth career
- Al-Wahda

Senior career*
Years	Team	Apps	(Gls)
2014–2024	Al-Wahda	121	(1)
2023–2024	→ Al-Nasr (loan)	4	(0)
2024–2025	Dubai United		
- * Club domestic league appearances and goals

Ahmed Rashed Sultan Al-Khabail Al-Mehrzi (Arabic: أحمد راشد; born 19 January 1997) is an Emirati footballer. He currently plays as a defender.
