= Nima Mokhtari =

Footballer

Personal information
- Full name: Nima Mokhtari
- Date of birth: 10 May 1998 (age 28)
- Place of birth: Tonekabon, Iran
- Position: Midfielder

Team information
- Current team: Pars Jonoubi
- Number: 6

Youth career
- 2007–2012: Shamoushak
- 2012–2015: Armin Tonekabon

Senior career*
Years	Team	Apps	(Gls)
2015–2018	Gostaresh Foolad	13	(0)
2018–2019	Nassaji Mazandaran	0	(0)
2020	Golreyhan	0	(0)
2020–	Pars Jonoubi	0	(0)

International career^{‡}
2012–2014	Iran U17		
2015–	Iran U20	2	(0)
- * Club domestic league appearances and goals as of 12 May 2017 ‡ National team caps and goals as of 30 November 2016

Nima Mokhtari (Persian: نیما مختاری; born 10 May 1998 in Tonekabon) is a footballer who plays as a midfielder for Iranian football club in the Persian Gulf Pro League.

== Other websites ==
Nima Mokhtari on Instagram
