= Yao Daogang =

Chinese association football player

Personal information
- Date of birth: 1 September 1997 (age 29)
- Place of birth: Fuyang, Anhui, China
- Height: 1.80 m (5 ft 11 in)
- Positions: Midfielder; full-back

Team information
- Current team: Tai'an Tiankuang
- Number: 2

Youth career
- –2015: Wuhan Zall
- 2016: Gondomar

Senior career*
Years	Team	Apps	(Gls)
2016–2020	Gondomar	29	(0)
2017	→ Chongqing Lifan (loan)	0	(0)
2021–2022	Hebei FC	36	(0)
2023	Meizhou Hakka	0	(0)
2024–	Tai'an Tiankuang	0	(0)

International career^{‡}
2012	China U16	3	(0)
2015–2016	China U19	6	(1)
2017–2019	China U23	7	(0)
- * Club domestic league appearances and goals as of 00:01, 17 January 2024 (UTC) ‡ National team caps and goals as of 00:01, 25 December 2021 (UTC)

Yao Daogang (Chinese: 姚道刚; born 1 September 1997) is a Chinese footballer currently playing as a midfielder or full-back for Tai'an Tiankuang.

== Career ==
Yao Daogang would play for the Wuhan Zall youth team before moving abroad to Portugal where he joined third tier football club Gondomar and would go on to be promoted to their senior team where he made his debut on 11 December 2016 in a league game against F.C. Cesarense in a 1-0 defeat. In the following season he would be loaned out to Chinese club Chongqing Dangdai Lifan on 28 February 2017, however he did not make any appearances for them at all. On his return he would remain with Gondomar for several seasons until he was released by the club and he would return to China where he had a successful trail with top tier club Hebei before officially joining them on 1 March 2021.

On 11 March 2024, Yao Daogang signed for China League Two club Tai'an Tiankuang. On 1 June 2024, in a match against Shandong Taishan B, Yao Daogang was sent off in the 92nd minute by a direct red card. To show dissent, Yao Daogang used verbal abuse and made physical contact towards the face of the referee. Three days later on 4 June, Yao Daogang was handed a 12-month suspension from football, and was fined ¥100,000 CNY.

== Personal life ==
Yao is the twin brother of fellow footballer Yao Wei.

== Career statistics ==
As of 4 October 2022.

Club	Season	League			Cup		Other		Total	
Club	Season	Division	Apps	Goals	Apps	Goals	Apps	Goals	Apps	Goals
Gondomar	2016–17	Campeonato de Portugal	2	0	0	0	0	0	2	0
Gondomar	2017–18	Campeonato de Portugal	6	0	0	0	0	0	6	0
Gondomar	2018–19	Campeonato de Portugal	9	0	0	0	0	0	9	0
Gondomar	2019–20	Campeonato de Portugal	12	0	0	0	0	0	12	0
Gondomar	Total		29	0	0	0	0	0	29	0
Chongqing Dangdai Lifan (loan)	2017	Chinese Super League	0	0	0	0	0	0	0	0
Hebei FC	2021	Chinese Super League	8	0	1 (Note: Appearances in the Chinese FA Cup)	0	0	0	9	0
Hebei FC	2022	Chinese Super League	17	0	0	0	0	0	17	0
Hebei FC	Total		25	0	1	0	0	0	26	0
Career total			54	0	1	0	0	0	55	0
