= Doston Ibragimov =

Uzbek footballer

Personal information
- Full name: Doston Ibragimov
- Date of birth: January 23, 1997 (age 29)
- Place of birth: Navoiy, Uzbekistan
- Position: Midfielder

Team information
- Current team: G'ijduvon
- Number: 17

Youth career
- 2010–2011: Qizilqum
- 2011–2012: Mashal Academy
- 2013–2016: Pakhtakor
- 2016–2017: Samarqand

Senior career*
Years	Team	Apps	(Gls)
2017–2020	Pakhtakor	17	(1)
2019	→ Buxoro (loan)	12	(3)
2019–2020	→ Qizilqum (loan)	18	(0)
2020	→ Chigatoy (loan)	17	(0)
2021–	G'ijduvon	3	(0)

International career^{‡}
2015–2016	Uzbekistan U19	4	(2)
2019–2020	Uzbekistan U23	4	(2)
2019–	Uzbekistan	3	(0)
- * Club domestic league appearances and goals as of 18:18, 13 July 2021 (UTC) ‡ National team caps and goals as of 10 July 2019

Doston Ibragimov (born 23 January 1997) is an Uzbekistani footballer who plays as a midfielder for FC G'ijduvon.

== International career ==
Ibragimov made his professional debut for the Uzbekistan national football team in a friendly 2–0 loss to Turkey on 2 June 2019.
