= Reza Jafari =

Iranian footballer

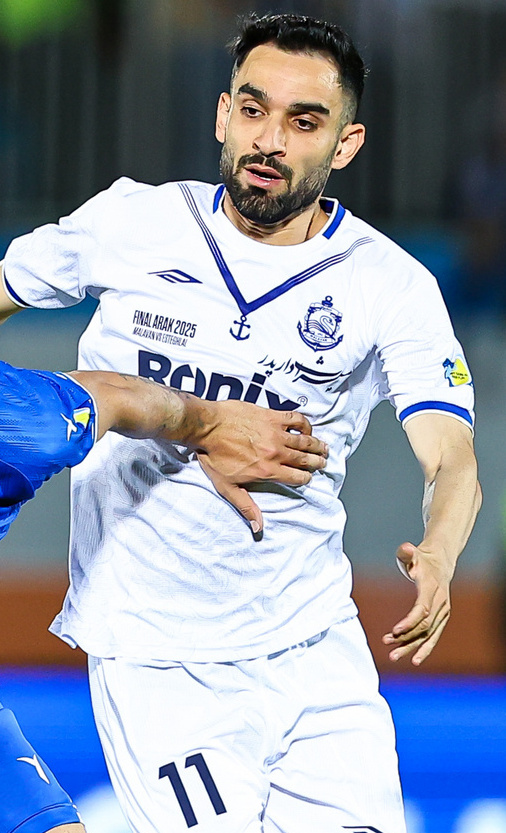

Personal information
- Date of birth: 11 January 1997 (age 29)
- Place of birth: Tehran, Iran
- Height: 1.75 m (5 ft 9 in)
- Position: Forward

Team information
- Current team: Sepahan
- Number: 11

Youth career
- 2010–2015: Fajr Sepasi
- 2015–2016: Saipa

Senior career*
Years	Team	Apps	(Gls)
2015–2016	Saipa B	37	(10)
2016–2021	Saipa	105	(8)
2021–2023	Nassaji	58	(2)
2023–2025	Malavan	57	(14)
2025–2026	Gol Gohar	17	(1)
2026–	Sepahan	5	(0)

International career^{‡}
2012–2014	Iran U17	4	(0)
2015–2017	Iran U20	13	(5)
2017	Iran U23	2	(0)
- * Club domestic league appearances and goals as of 18 April 2025 ‡ National team caps and goals as of 23 July 2017

Reza Jafari (Persian: رضا جعفری; born 11 January 1997) is an Iranian football forward who plays for Sepahan in the Persian Gulf Pro League.
