= Steve Kuzmanovski =

Australian soccer player (born 1997)

Personal information
- Full name: Steve Kuzmanovski
- Date of birth: 4 January 1997 (age 29)
- Place of birth: Sydney, Australia
- Height: 1.85 m (6 ft 1 in)
- Position: Winger

Team information
- Current team: St George City

Youth career
- 2013–2014: AIS
- 2014–2015: Western Sydney Wanderers

Senior career*
Years	Team	Apps	(Gls)
2013	AIS	7	(2)
2014–2015	Western Sydney Wanderers	8	(0)
2015–2017	Melbourne City	6	(0)
2016	Melbourne City NPL	5	(0)
2018–2019	St George City	54	(19)
2021	Altona Magic	2	(0)
2021–	St George City	7	(2)

International career^{‡}
2012	Australia U-17	6	(1)
2015–2016	Australia U-20	15	(6)
Medal record
Men's football
Representing Australia
AFF U-19 Youth Championship
First place	2016 Vietnam	U-20 Team
- * Club domestic league appearances and goals as of 17 June 2021 ‡ National team caps and goals as of 22 October 2016

Steve Kuzmanovski (Macedonian: Стив Кузмановски; born 4 January 1997) is an Australian professional footballer who plays for St George City in the NSW League One.

== Club career ==
As a 16-year-old, Kuzmanovski played seven matches, scoring twice, for the AIS team in the ACT division of the 2013 National Premier Leagues.

A product of Western Sydney Wanderers youth academy, he scored a goal for the club in a youth league match against Perth Glory FC. On 6 January 2015, he made his A-League debut against Melbourne Victory.

On 8 June 2015, Kuzmanovski signed for Melbourne City on a two-year deal.

On 1 May 2017, Melbourne City announced Kuzmanovski would not be offered a new contract, his professional career curtailed by two anterior cruciate ligament injuries and sciatica after a lower back injury. After a two year period of recovery he began playing in the National Premier Leagues state system. He had success with Sydney club St George City, with a brief stint at Altona Magic before returning to St George.

== Honours ==
=== International ===
Australia U20

- AFF U-19 Youth Championship: 2016
