= Kim Geon-woong =

South Korean footballer (born 1997)

Personal information
- Date of birth: 29 August 1997 (age 29)
- Place of birth: South Korea
- Height: 1.88 m (6 ft 2 in)
- Position: Midfielder

Team information
- Current team: Jeju United
- Number: 8

Youth career
- –2015: Hyundai High School

Senior career*
Years	Team	Apps	(Gls)
2016–2020	Ulsan Hyundai	16	(0)
2019	→ Jeonnam Dragons (loan)	33	(3)
2020–2023	Suwon FC	95	(4)
2023	Jeonbuk Hyundai Motors	11	(0)
2023–	Jeju United	51	(2)
2025	→ Incheon (loan)	20	(0)

International career^{‡}
2015–2016	South Korea U-20	19	(2)
2018–	South Korea U-23	3	(0)
Medal record
Representing South Korea
Men's football
Asian Games
Gold medal – first place	2018 Jakarta-Palembang	Team
- * Club domestic league appearances and goals as of 1 August 2026 ‡ National team caps and goals as of 17 August 2018

- Kim Geon-woong
- Hangul: 김건웅
- Hanja: 金健雄
- RR: Gim Geonung
- MR: Kim Kŏnung

Kim Geon-woong (Korean: 김건웅; Hanja: 金健雄; born 29 August 1997) is a South Korean football midfielder who plays for Jeju United and the South Korea national under-23 football team.

== Club career ==
Kim joined Ulsan Hyundai in 2016. On 1 May 2016, Kim made his senior team debut in K League Classic against Incheon United at Incheon Football Stadium, replacing Seo Jung-jin at the 79th minute by the coach Yoon Jong-hwan. On 13 July 2016, he scored his first goal for senior team against Incheon United in 2016 Korean FA Cup quarter-final match at the 15th minute. Ulsan won the game by 4–1.

== International career ==
Kim was a member of the South Korea U-20 national team from 2015 to 2016. He won the gold medal with the South Korea U-23 national team at the 2018 Asian Games.

== Career statistics ==
=== Club ===
As of 22 October 2022

Club performance			League		Cup		Continental		Other		Total	
Season	Club	League	Apps	Goals	Apps	Goals	Apps	Goals	Apps	Goals	Apps	Goals
South Korea			League		KFA Cup		Asia		Other		Total	
2016	Ulsan Hyundai	K League 1	12	0	3	1	—		—		15	1
2017	Ulsan Hyundai	K League 1	2	0	1	0	1	0	—		4	0
2018	Ulsan Hyundai	K League 1	2	0	0	0	2	0	—		4	0
2019	Jeonnam Dragons (loan)	K League 2	33	3	1	0	—		—		34	3
2020	Suwon FC	K League 2	25	1	1	0	—		1	0	27	1
2021	Suwon FC	K League 1	34	1	1	0	—		—		35	1
2022	Suwon FC	K League 1	36	2	0	0	—		—		36	0
2023	Jeonbuk Hyundai Motors	K League 1	0	0	0	0	0	0	—		0	0
Total	South Korea		144	7	7	1	3	0	1	0	155	8
Career total			144	7	7	1	3	0	1	0	155	8
