= Kang Ji-hoon =

South Korean footballer (born 1997)

Personal information
- Full name: Kang Ji-hoon
- Date of birth: 6 January 1997 (age 29)
- Place of birth: South Korea
- Height: 1.77 m (5 ft 10 in)
- Position: Midfielder

Team information
- Current team: FC Anyang
- Number: 17

Youth career
- 2012–2014: Yongho High School
- 2015–2017: Yongin University

Senior career*
Years	Team	Apps	(Gls)
2018–2024	Gangwon FC	68	(3)
2020–2021	→ Sangju / Gimcheon Sangmu (army)	17	(2)
2024	Busan IPark	18	(0)
2025–	FC Anyang	37	(1)

International career^{‡}
2015–2017	South Korea U-20	30	(12)
2017–	South Korea U-23	2	(0)
- * Club domestic league appearances and goals as of August 3, 2026 ‡ National team caps and goals as of March 13, 2018

- Kang Ji-hoon
- Hangul: 강지훈
- RR: Gang Jihun
- MR: Kang Chihun

Kang Ji-hoon (Korean: 강지훈; born 6 January 1997) is a South Korean football midfielder who plays for FC Anyang.
