= 2014 Adelaide United FC (women) season =

Adelaide United WFC
2014 season
- Chairman: Greg Griffin
- Manager: Ross Aloisi
- Stadium: Adelaide Shores Football Centre
- W-League: 7th
- Top goalscorer: Kristy Moore (3)
Home colours	Away colours

The 2014 Adelaide United FC W-League season was the club's seventh participation in the W-League, since the league's formation in 2008.

== Players ==
=== Squad information ===
Note: Flags indicate national team as defined under FIFA eligibility rules; some limited exceptions apply. Players may hold more than one non-FIFA nationality.

No.	Pos.	Nation	Player
1	GK	AUS	Melissa Barbieri
2	MF	AUS	Monique Iannella
4	DF	AUS	Lauren Steer
5	DF	AUS	Jessie Wharepouri
6	MF	AUS	Dylan Holmes
7	MF	DEN	Katrine Pedersen
8	MF	AUS	Emily Condon
9	MF	NOR	Lisa-Marie Woods
10	MF	AUS	Alex Chidiac
11	MF	AUS	Isabel Hodgson

No.	Pos.	Nation	Player
12	DF	AUS	Daila Tais-Borg
14	FW	AUS	Rachel Alonso
15	DF	AUS	Jenna McCormick
16	MF	ENG	Katie Holtham
17	FW	AUS	Tiarn Powell
18	MF	AUS	Georgia Campagnale
19	DF	AUS	Gaby Bentley
20	GK	AUS	Sarah Willacy
23	FW	ENG	Kristy Moore (Captain)

=== Transfers in ===
Note: Flags indicate national team as defined under FIFA eligibility rules; some limited exceptions apply. Players may hold more than one non-FIFA nationality.

No.	Pos.	Nation	Player
10	MF	AUS	Alex Chidiac (from (Australia) FFSA NTC)
6		AUS	Dylan Holmes (from (Australia) FFSA NTC)
4		AUS	Lauren Steer (from (Australia) FFSA NTC)
18		AUS	Georgia Campagnale (from (Australia) Adelaide City)
14	FW	AUS	Rachel Alonso (from (Australia) Bundoora United)
7	MF	DEN	Katrine Pedersen (from (Norway) Stabæk)
16	MF	ENG	Katie Holtham (from (England) Notts County)
—		AUS	Sarah Willacy (from (Australia) Adelaide City)
—		AUS	Gaby Bently (from (Australia) FFSA NTC)

=== Transfers out ===
Note: Flags indicate national team as defined under FIFA eligibility rules; some limited exceptions apply. Players may hold more than one non-FIFA nationality.

No.	Pos.	Nation	Player
2	MF	AUS	Bianca Gray
3	DF	AUS	Alexandra Gummer (to (Australia) Melbourne Victory)
4	MF	AUS	Tegan Riding
6	MF	ENG	Laura Stockdale
7	FW	AUS	Racheal Quigley (to (Australia) Melbourne Victory)
14	MF	AUS	Jayah Brown
16	MF	AUS	Jessica Waterhouse
19	MF	AUS	Daniela Di Bartolo
18	MF	AUS	Jessica Nagel
20	GK	AUS	Kelly Barltrop
21	MF	AUS	Sneź Veljanovska
24	FW	SCO	Louise Mason

== Technical staff ==
Position	Name
Head coach	(Australia) Ross Aloisi
Assistant coach	(Australia) Geoff Hargreaves
Assistant coach	(Australia) Paul Pezos
Assistant coach	(Australia) Joel Porter
Assistant coach	(Australia) Tracey Jenkins
Goalkeeper coach	(Australia) Neil Tate
Conditioning Coach	(Australia) Nik Hagicostas
Doctor	(Australia) James Ilic
Physiotherapist	(Australia) Marieke Cornielissen
Physiotherapist	(Australia) Harry Roesch
Sports Trainer	(Australia) Carol Goddard

== Competitions ==
=== W-League ===
==== League table ====
Pos	Team	Pld	W	D	L	GF	GA	GD	Pts	Qualification
1	Perth Glory	12	10	0	2	39	10	+29	30	Qualification to Finals series
2	Melbourne Victory	12	6	2	4	26	15	+11	20	Qualification to Finals series
3	Canberra United (C)	12	6	2	4	22	18	+4	20	Qualification to Finals series
4	Sydney FC	12	5	3	4	17	16	+1	18	Qualification to Finals series
5	Newcastle Jets	12	5	2	5	25	21	+4	17	
6	Brisbane Roar	12	4	2	6	18	19	−1	14	
7	Adelaide United	12	3	1	8	9	29	−20	10	
8	Western Sydney Wanderers	12	2	2	8	14	42	−28	8	

Source: au.soccerway.com
Rules for classification: 1) points; 2) goal difference; 3) number of goals scored.
(C) Champions

==== Results summary ====
Overall								Home						Away					
Pld	W	D	L	GF	GA	GD	Pts	W	D	L	GF	GA	GD	W	D	L	GF	GA	GD
12	3	1	8	9	29	−20	10	2	1	3	5	13	−8	1	0	5	4	16	−12

Last updated: 29 November 2014.
Source: Competitive Matches

==== Results by round ====
Round	1	2	3	4	5	6	7	8	9	10	11	12
Ground	A	H	A	H	A	A	H	A	A	H	H	H
Result	L	L	L	L	L	W	W	L	L	L	D	W
Position	7	7	7	7	8	7	6	6	6	6	7	7

Updated to match(es) played on 30 November 2014. Source: Competitive Matches
A = Away; H = Home; W = Win; D = Draw; L = Loss

==== Goal scorers ====
Total	Player		Goals per Round											
Total	Player		1	2	3	4	5	6	7	8	9	10	11	12
3	(England)	Kristy Moore						2	1					
2	(Norway)	Lisa-Marie Woods			1									1
2	(Australia)	Tiarn Powell						1						1
1	(Australia)	Emily Condon											1	
1	(Australia)	Alex Chidiac											1	
9	TOTAL		0	0	1	0	0	3	1	0	0	0	2	2

==== Matches ====
14 September 2014 1	Sydney FC	2–0	Adelaide United	Sydney
16:00 AEST	Spencer 39', 70'	Report		Stadium: Lambert Park; Referee: Kiralee Andruschak

21 September 2014 2	Adelaide United	0–1	Canberra United	Adelaide
14:30 ACST		Report	Ochs 60'	Stadium: Adelaide Shores Football Centre

27 September 2014 3	Perth Glory	3–1	Adelaide United	Perth
15:00 AWST	D'Ovidio 45'; Kerr 56'; K. Gill 59'	Report	Woods 46'	Stadium: Ashfield Reserve; Referee: Lara Smith

5 October 2014 4	Adelaide United	0–4	Newcastle Jets	Adelaide
14:30 ACDT		Report	Huster 28' van Egmond 44'; Dobson 48', 74'	Stadium: Adelaide Shores Football Centre; Referee: Kelly Jones

12 October 2014 5	Melbourne Victory	4–0	Adelaide United	Melbourne
15:00 AEDT	Nairn 29'; Jackson 59' 87' 89'	Report		Stadium: Lakeside Stadium; Attendance: 900; Referee: Rachel Mitchenson

19 October 2014 6	Canberra United	2–3	Adelaide United	Canberra
15:00 AEDT	Heyman 47'; Munoz 75'	Report	Moore 43', 60'; Powell 76'	Stadium: McKellar Park; Attendance: 794; Referee: Lara Smith

25 October 2014 7	Adelaide United	1–0	Perth Glory	Adelaide
14:30 ACDT	Moore 61'	Report		Stadium: Adelaide Shores Football Centre; Referee: Kirralee Andruschak

29 November 2014 8	Newcastle Jets	2–0	Adelaide United	Newcastle
15:00 AEDT	Huster 9'; Dobson 64'	Report		Stadium: Wanderers Oval; Referee: Rachel Mitchenson

8 November 2014 9	Brisbane Roar	3–0	Adelaide United	Brisbane
16:30 AEST	Butt 26', 74'; Gielnik 30'	Report		Stadium: Suncorp Stadium; Referee: Kelly Jones

14 November 2014 10	Adelaide United	0–5	Sydney FC	Adelaide
19:30 ACDT		Report	Bolger 22', 53'; Rollason 27'; Price 67'; Spencer 90+3'	Stadium: Adelaide Shores Football Centre; Referee: Casey Reibelt

23 November 2014 11	Adelaide United	2–2	Western Sydney Wanderers	Adelaide
14:30 ACDT	Condon 3'; Chidiac 72'	Report	Winters 27' (pen.), 63' (pen.)	Stadium: Adelaide Shores Football Centre; Referee: Lara Smith

29 October 2014 12	Adelaide United	2–1	Melbourne Victory	Adelaide
19:00 ACDT	Woods 80'; Powell 84'	Report	Barnes 3'	Stadium: Adelaide Shores Football Centre
