= 2013–14 in Australian soccer =

45th season of national competitive soccer in Australia

Soccer in Australia
- Season: 2013–14

Men's soccer
- A-League Premiership: Brisbane Roar
- A-League Championship: Brisbane Roar
- National Premier Leagues: Sydney United 58
- National Youth League Premiership: Sydney FC Youth

Women's soccer
- W-League Premiership: Canberra United
- W-League Championship: Melbourne Victory

The 2013–14 season was the 45th season of national competitive soccer in Australia and 131st overall.

2013 was the inaugural season of the National Premier Leagues, with five member federations participating.

== Domestic leagues ==
=== A-League ===
The 2013–14 A-League regular season began on 11 October 2013 and ended on 13 April 2014.

Pos	Team	Pld	W	D	L	GF	GA	GD	Pts	Qualification
1	Brisbane Roar (C)	27	16	4	7	43	25	+18	52	Qualificaition for 2015 AFC Champions League group stage and finals series
2	Western Sydney Wanderers	27	11	9	7	34	29	+5	42	Qualificaition for 2015 AFC Champions League group stage and finals series
3	Central Coast Mariners	27	12	6	9	33	36	−3	42	Qualification for 2015 AFC Champions League qualifying play-off and finals series (Note: Since the winner of 2014 A-League Grand Final (Brisbane Roar) qualified for the 2015 AFC Champions League group stage, the 2nd and 3rd placed teams qualified for the group stage and the qualifying play-off of 2015 AFC Champions League.)
4	Melbourne Victory	27	11	8	8	42	43	−1	41	Qualification for Finals series
5	Sydney FC	27	12	3	12	40	38	+2	39	Qualification for Finals series
6	Adelaide United	27	10	8	9	45	36	+9	38	Qualification for Finals series
7	Newcastle Jets	27	10	6	11	34	34	0	36	
8	Perth Glory	27	7	7	13	28	37	−9	28	
9	Wellington Phoenix (Note: Wellington Phoenix cannot qualify for the AFC Champions League as they are not recognised as an AFC club.)	27	7	7	13	36	51	−15	28	
10	Melbourne Heart	27	6	8	13	36	42	−6	26	

Updated to match(es) played on 13 April 2014. Source: ultimatealeague.com
Rules for classification: 1) points; 2) goal difference; 3) number of goals scored.
(C) Champions
Notes:

Elimination-finals; 18–19 April
Melbourne Victory	2
Sydney FC	1
Central Coast Mariners	1
Adelaide United	0

Semi-finals; 26–27 April
Brisbane Roar	1
Melbourne Victory	0
Western Sydney Wanderers	2
Central Coast Mariners	0

Grand Final; 4 May
Brisbane Roar (a.e.t.)	2
Western Sydney Wanderers	1

=== W-League ===
The 2013–14 W-League regular season began on 9 November 2013 and ended on 9 February 2014.

Pos	Team	Pld	W	D	L	GF	GA	GD	Pts	Qualification
1	Canberra United	12	9	0	3	28	8	+20	27	Qualification to Finals series
2	Sydney FC	12	8	2	2	37	14	+23	26	Qualification to Finals series
3	Melbourne Victory (C)	12	7	2	3	23	12	+11	23	Qualification to Finals series
4	Brisbane Roar	12	7	2	3	22	16	+6	23	Qualification to Finals series
5	Perth Glory	12	5	0	7	17	31	−14	15	
6	Adelaide United	12	3	4	5	12	15	−3	13	
7	Western Sydney Wanderers	12	2	3	7	17	23	−6	9	
8	Newcastle Jets	12	0	1	11	10	47	−37	1	

Source: au.soccerway.com
Rules for classification: 1) points; 2) goal difference; 3) number of goals scored.
(C) Champions

Semi-finals; 15–16 February
1	Canberra United	1
4	Brisbane Roar	2
3	Sydney FC	2
2	Melbourne Victory	3

Grand final 23 February
Melbourne Victory	2
Brisbane Roar	0

=== National Premier Leagues ===
2013 was the inaugural season of the National Premier Leagues with five member federations participating. The 2013 National Premier Leagues regular season in the states' leagues ran from 22 February 2013 until 1 September 2013 and the states' finals series ran from 24 August 2013 until 21 September 2013.

The National Finals series began on 29 September 2013 and ended with the Grand Final on 13 October 2013.

Quarter-finals; 29 September
(New South Wales) Sydney United 58	2
(Australian Capital Territory) Canberra FC	1

Semi-finals; 5–6 October
(Queensland) Olympic FC	3
(New South Wales) Sydney United 58	4
(Tasmania) South Hobart	3
(South Australia) Campbelltown City	1

Grand final 13 October
(New South Wales) Sydney United 58	2
(Tasmania) South Hobart	0

=== National Youth League ===
The 2013–14 season of the National Youth League (NYL) ran between 26 October 2013 – 2 March 2014.

Pos	Team	Pld	W	D	L	GF	GA	GD	Pts
1	Sydney FC Youth (C)	18	13	2	3	49	29	+20	41
2	Newcastle Jets Youth	18	11	4	3	50	29	+21	37
3	Melbourne Victory Youth	18	9	4	5	50	36	+14	31
4	Adelaide United Youth	18	9	3	6	41	36	+5	30
5	Melbourne Heart Youth	18	8	4	6	40	30	+10	28
6	Western Sydney Wanderers Youth	18	7	2	9	37	33	+4	23
7	Brisbane Roar Youth	18	6	5	7	41	45	−4	23
8	AIS Football Program	18	6	3	9	32	47	−15	21
9	Perth Glory Youth	18	5	0	13	35	67	−32	15
10	Central Coast Mariners Academy	18	1	3	14	20	43	−23	6

Source: au.soccerway.com
Rules for classification: 1) points; 2) goal difference; 3) number of goals scored.
(C) Champions

== International club competitions ==
=== AFC Champions League ===
Western Sydney Wanderers and Central Coast Mariners both entered the competition directly into the group stage, being drawn to Groups H and F respectively. Melbourne Victory entered the competition at Round 3 of the qualifying play-off, and beat Muangthong United 2–1 and were drawn to Group G.

Central Coast Mariners finished the group stage at the bottom of the group, accumulating two wins (against Sanfrecce Hiroshima and Beijing Guoan) and four losses (against Beijing Guoan, Sanfreece Hiroshima and twice against group winner FC Seoul).

Melbourne Victory finished the group stage in the 3rd place, accumulating two wins (against Yokohama F. Marinos and defending champions Guangzhou Evergrande), two draws (both against Jeonbuk Hyundai Motors) and two losses (against Guangzhou Evergrande and Yokohoma F. Marinos).

Western Sydney Wanderers advanced from the group in the first place placing above Kawasaki Frontale based on overall goal difference. They recorded four wins (against Kawasaki Frontale, Ulsan Hyundai and twice against Guizhou Renhe) and two losses (against Ulsan Hyundai and Kawasaki Frontale). In the knock-out stage Round of 16 against Sanfrecce Hiroshima they lost the first leg 3–1, but then managed to win the second leg at home 2–0 and advanced with the away goals rule. They drew defending champions Guangzhou Evergrand for the quarter-finals.

Western Sydney Wanderers faced defending champions Guangzhou Evergrande from China in the quarter-finals and advanced again on the away goals rule with a 2–2 score line over two legs. They faced South Korean FC Seoul in the semi-finals, drawing the first leg 0–0, but then managed to win 2–0 in the second leg at Parramatta Stadium. Wanderers went on to win the Champions League 1–0 on aggregate defeating Saudi Arabian club Al-Hilal with a 1–0 win in the 1st leg, and a 0–0 draw in the second leg in the final.

=== International Women's Club Championship ===
The W-League was represented in the second edition of the International Women's Club Championship, known for sponsorship reasons as the Mobcast Cup.

Sydney FC (the winners of the 2012–13 season) participated in the tournament, which took place from 30 November until 8 December 2013, and finished in third place (out of 5 teams).

== National teams ==
=== Men's senior ===
==== Friendlies ====
8 September 2013	Brazil	6–0	Australia	Brasília, Brazil
05:15 AEST	Jô 8', 34'; Neymar 36'; Ramires 58'; Pato 73'; Luiz Gustavo 84'	Report		Stadium: Estádio Nacional Mané Garrincha; Attendance: 40,996; Referee: Enrique Cáceres (Paraguay)

12 October 2013	France	6–0	Australia	Paris, France
	Ribéry 8' (pen.); Giroud 16', 27'; Cabaye 29'; Debuchy 47'; Benzema 51'	Report		Stadium: Parc des Princes; Attendance: 30,000; Referee: Artur Soares Dias (Portugal)

16 October 2013	Australia	3–0	Canada	London, England
	Kennedy 1'; Vidošić 52'; Leckie 79'	Report		Stadium: Craven Cottage; Attendance: 3,741; Referee: Michael Dean (England)

19 November 2013	Australia	1–0	Costa Rica	Sydney, Australia
19:30 AEDT	Cahill 69'	Report		Stadium: Sydney Football Stadium; Attendance: 20,165; Referee: Hiroyoshi Takayama (Japan)

5 March 2014	Australia	3–4	Ecuador	London, England
20:00	Cahill 8', 31'; Jedinak 15' (pen.); Langerak (red card) 58'	Report	Martínez 56'; Castillo 60' (pen.); E. Valencia 76'; Méndez 90+1'	Stadium: The Den; Attendance: 7,133; Referee: Lee Probert (England)

26 May 2014	Australia	1–1	South Africa	Sydney, Australia
19:30	Cahill 14'	Report	Patosi 13'	Stadium: ANZ Stadium; Attendance: 50,468; Referee: Kim Jong-hyeok (South Korea)

6 June 2014	Australia	0–1	Croatia	Salvador, Brazil
		Report	Jelavić 58'	Stadium: Estádio de Pituaçu; Referee: Francisco Carlos do Nascimento (Brazil)

==== EAFF East Asian Cup ====
20 July 2013	South Korea	0–0	Australia	Seoul, South Korea
19:00 UTC+9		Report		Stadium: Olympic Stadium; Attendance: 31,571; Referee: Yuichi Nishimura (Japan)

25 July 2013	Japan	3–2	Australia	Hwaseong, South Korea
20:00 UTC+9	Saito 26'; Osako 56' 79'	Report	Duke 76'; Juric 78'	Stadium: Hwaseong Stadium; Referee: Kim Jong-Hyeok (South Korea)

28 July 2013	Australia	3–4	China	Seoul, South Korea
17:15 UTC+9	Mooy 30'; Taggart 89'; Duke 90+3'	Report	Yu Dabao 5'; Sun Ke 56'; Yang Xu 87'; Wu Lei 88'	Stadium: Olympic Stadium; Referee: Liu Kwok Man (Hong Kong)

==== FIFA World Cup ====
13 June 2014 Group Stage	Chile	3–1	Australia	Cuiabá, Brazil
19:00	Sánchez 12'; Valdivia 14'; Beausejour 90+2'	Report	Cahill 35'	Stadium: Arena Pantanal; Attendance: 40,275; Referee: Noumandiez Doué (Ivory Coast)

18 June 2014 Group Stage	Australia	2–3	Netherlands	Porto Alegre, Brazil
13:00	Cahill 21'; Jedinak 54' (pen.)	Report	Robben 20' van Persie 58'; Memphis 68'	Stadium: Estádio Beira-Rio; Attendance: 42,877; Referee: Djamel Haimoudi (Algeria)

23 June 2014 Group Stage	Australia	0–3	Spain	Curitiba, Brazil
13:00		Report	Villa 36'; Torres 69'; Mata 82'	Stadium: Arena da Baixada; Attendance: 39,375; Referee: Nawaf Shukralla (Bahrain)

=== Men's under 23 ===
==== AFC U-22 Championship ====
12 January 2014 Group Stage	Australia	1–0	Kuwait	Muscat, Oman
17:00 PGST	Kitto 70'	Report		Stadium: Royal Oman Police Stadium; Attendance: 500; Referee: Ma Ning (China)

14 January 2014 Group Stage	Australia	0–1	Iran	Muscat, Oman
17:00 PGST		Report	Skapetis 56'	Stadium: Royal Oman Police Stadium; Attendance: 250; Referee: Kim Jong Hyeok (South Korea)

1 January 2014 Group Stage	Australia	0–4	Japan	Muscat, Oman
17:00 PGST		Report	Nakajima 18', 48' (pen.); Yajima 24'; Brown 45' (o.g.)	Stadium: Royal Oman Police Stadium; Attendance: 150; Referee: Abdulla Hassan Mohamed (United Arab Emirates)

20 January 2014 Quarter-final	Australia	1–2	Saudi Arabia	Muscat, Oman
17:00 PGST	Skapetis 77' (pen.)	Report	Assiri 58'; Al Ammar 62'	Stadium: Royal Oman Police Stadium; Attendance: 200; Referee: Iida Jumpei (Japan)

=== Men's under 20 ===
==== Friendlies ====
August 2013 COTIF International Tournament	Australia	0–1	Qatar	L'Alcúdia, Spain
		Report	Hassan 9'	Stadium: Estadio Municipal Els Arcs De L'Alcúdia; Attendance: 1,000; Referee: Oscar Ruiz Garcia (Spain)

13 August 2013 COTIF International Tournament	Mexico	4–2	Australia	L'Alcúdia, Spain
21:00	Almeida 6', 21'; Ramirez 54'; Martínez 70'	Report	Jimenez 24'; Cowburn 56'	Stadium: Estadio Municipal Els Arcs De L'Alcúdia; Referee: Jonathan Bernabeu (Spain)

15 August 2013 COTIF International Tournament	Australia	3–1	Saudi Arabia	L'Alcúdia, Spain
	Cristaldo 8'; Skapetis 57', 90'	Report	Mohammed 56'	Stadium: Estadio Municipal Els Arcs De L'Alcúdia

16 August 2013 COTIF International Tournament	Spain	3–2	Australia	L'Alcúdia, Spain
	Pino 11'; López 46'; Hermoso 70'	Report	Skapetis 4', 65'	Stadium: Estadio Municipal Els Arcs De L'Alcúdia; Attendance: 6,000; Referee: Abraham Abad (Spain)

30 April 2014	Manly United (Australia)	v	Australia	Sydney, Australia
19:00 AEST				Stadium: Cromer Park

9 May 2014	Oman	1–3	Australia	Dubai, United Arab Emirates
	Goal	Report	Ikonomidis (?); Brady (?)

11 May 2014	Oman	v	Australia	United Arab Emirates

14 May 2014	United Arab Emirates	v	Australia	United Arab Emirates

14 May 2014	Al Shabab U-20 (Saudi Arabia)	0–2	Australia
		Report	Skapetis (?); Ikonomidis (?)

16 May 2014	United Arab Emirates	v	Australia	United Arab Emirates

==== AFC U-19 Championship qualification ====
3 October 2013 Group Stage	Australia	7–0	Hong Kong	Kuala Lumpur, Malaysia
17:00 MST	Skapetis 12', 48', 55' (pen.), 87'; Cristaldo 52', 68'; Oxborrow 71'	Report		Stadium: Kuala Lumpur Stadium; Attendance: 98; Referee: Jumpei Iida (Japan)

5 October 2013 Group Stage	Chinese Taipei	0–3	Australia	Kuala Lumpur, Malaysia
20:00 MST		Report	Olsen 20'; Ikonomidis 21', 47'	Stadium: Kuala Lumpur Stadium; Attendance: 76; Referee: Banjar Al-Dosari (Qatar)

7 October 2013 Group Stage	Australia	1–5	Vietnam	Kuala Lumpur, Malaysia
17:00 MST	Skapetis 45+3'	Report	Phượng 8', 54'; Tùng 17'; Toàn 44'; Sơn 70' (pen.)	Stadium: Kuala Lumpur Stadium; Attendance: 300; Referee: Jumpei Iida (Japan)

=== Men's under 17 ===
==== AFF U-16 Youth Championship ====
20 August 2013 Group Stage	Australia	4–0	Cambodia	Naypyidaw, Myanmar
16:00 MST	Bandiera 4', 34'; Dimitroff 15'; Maskin 83'	Report		Stadium: Wunna Theikdi Stadium; Referee: Steve Supresencia (Philippines)

22 August 2013 Group Stage	Australia	2–0	Myanmar	Naypyidaw, Myanmar
16:00 MST	Maskin 29'; Mendez 62'	Report		Stadium: Wunna Theikdi Stadium; Referee: Xaypaseuth Phongsanit (Laos)

24 August 2013 Group Stage	Brunei	0–19	Australia	Naypyidaw, Myanmar
16:00 MST		Report	Petratos 9', 88', 89'; McGree 11', 19', 82'; Bandiera 23' de Godoy 26'; Dimitroff 33'; Joice 38', 51', 57', 78', 83', 90+1'; Mendez 65', 70', 73'; Verbi 90'	Stadium: Wunna Theikdi Stadium; Referee: Steve Supresencia (Philippines)

26 August 2013 Group Stage	Australia	3–0	Vietnam	Naypyidaw, Myanmar
16:00 MST	Maskin 19'; Bandiera 65', 85'	Report		Stadium: Wunna Theikdi Stadium; Referee: Mongkolchai Pechsri (Thailand)

31 August 2013 Semi-final	Australia	2–2 (4–5 p)	Indonesia	Naypyidaw, Myanmar
16:00 MST	Reiners 31'; Petratos 67'	Report	Gatot 56'; Reksa 80'	Stadium: Wunna Theikdi Stadium; Referee: Win Htut (Myanmar)
	Penalties
	Petratos (penalty scored); Reiners (penalty missed); Maskin (penalty scored); Kim (penalty scored); Verbi (penalty scored)		(penalty scored) Radja; (penalty scored) Samuel; (penalty scored) Anang; (penalty scored) Reksa; (penalty scored) Asnawi

2 September 2013 Third place play-off	Australia	0–0 (7–6 p)	Vietnam	Naypyidaw, Myanmar
16:00 MST		Report		Stadium: Wunna Theikdi Stadium; Referee: Vichhika Tuy (Cambodia)
	Penalties
	Dimitroff (penalty scored); Petratos (penalty scored); Bandiera (penalty scored); Caletti (penalty scored); Maskin (penalty scored); Panetta (penalty scored); Fotakopoulos (penalty scored); Verbi (penalty missed)		(penalty scored) Phong; (penalty scored) Hóa; (penalty scored) Anh; (penalty scored) Hân; (penalty scored) Danh; (penalty scored) Huy; (penalty missed) Tài; (penalty missed) Dũng

==== AFC U-16 Championship qualification ====
24 September 2013 Group Stage	Chinese Taipei	0–7	Australia	Happy Valley, Hong Kong
10:30 HKT		Report	Panetta 20'; Bandiera 23', 39', 61', 76'; Fotakopoulos 31'; Dimitroff 35'	Stadium: Hong Kong Football Club Stadium; Attendance: 150; Referee: Nivon Robesh Gamini (Sri Lanka)

25 September 2013 Group Stage	Australia	14–1	Macau	Happy Valley, Hong Kong
10:30 HKT	Reiners 4', 51'; D'Agostino 5', 31' (pen.); Devereux 15'; Stokes 17' de Godoy 19', 43'; Petratos 22', 82'; Kim 63'; Mendez 70'; Caletti 76'; Maskin 90+1'	Report	Vong Chak Man 56'	Stadium: Hong Kong Football Club Stadium; Attendance: 100; Referee: Thong Chanketya (Cambodia)

27 September 2013 Group Stage	Hong Kong	0–2	Australia	Happy Valley, Hong Kong
14:30 HKT		Report	D'Agostino 33'; Brimmer 39'	Stadium: Hong Kong Football Club Stadium; Attendance: 230; Referee: Yudai Yamamoto (Japan)

29 September 2013 Group Stage	Australia	3–1	Singapore	Happy Valley, Hong Kong
10:30 HKT	Devereux 13'; Panetta 16'; Bandiera 52' (pen.)	Report	Anugerah 39'	Stadium: Hong Kong Football Club Stadium; Attendance: 50; Referee: Yudai Yamamoto (Japan)

=== Women's senior ===
==== Friendlies ====
6 July 2013	France	0–2	Australia	Angers, France
20:30 CEST		Report	Butt 35'; Gorry 70'	Stadium: Stade Jean-Bouin

20 October 2013	United States	4–0	Australia	San Antonio, United States
18:00 CST	Holiday 6'; Lloyd 14'; Wambach 56'; Press 90+2'	Report		Stadium: Alamodome; Attendance: 19,109; Referee: Kari Seitz (United States)

24 November 2013	Australia	2–0	China	Wollongong, Australia
15:00 AEDT	Gorry 34'; Butt 39'	Report		Stadium: WIN Stadium; Referee: Fusako Kajiyama (Japan)

27 November 2013	Australia	2–1	China	Parramatta, Australia
19:00 AEDT	De Vanna 30' van Egmond 57'	Report	Li 73' (pen.)	Stadium: Pirtek Stadium; Referee: Nami Sato (Japan)

6 April 2014	Australia	0–1	Brazil	Brisbane, Australia
15:00 AEST		Report	Debinha 68'	Stadium: QSAC; Attendance: 2,583; Referee: Nami Inazumi (Japan)

9 April 2014	Australia	2–1	Brazil	Brisbane, Australia
16:30 AEST	Gill 37'; Heyman 81'	Report	Gomes 53'	Stadium: QSAC; Referee: Rikako Kawahara (Japan)

==== Cyprus Cup ====
5 March 2014 Group Stage	Netherlands	2–2	Australia	Larnaca, Cyprus
14:30 EET	Miedema 12' van der Gragt 34'	Report	Gorry 54'; Heyman 59'	Stadium: GSZ Stadium; Referee: Linn Andersson (Sweden)

7 March 2014 Group Stage	France	3–2	Australia	Nicosia, Cyprus
17:30 EET	Delie 9'; Thomis 24'; Nécib 37'	Report	Kerr 52' van Egmond 62' (pen.)	Stadium: GSP Stadium

10 March 2014 Group Stage	Australia	2–4	Scotland	Larnaca, Cyprus
17:30 EET	Carroll (yellow card) 28' (red card) 90+1'; Heyman 64', 74'	Report	Evans 12'; J. Ross 28', 30', 70'	Stadium: GSZ Stadium; Referee: Jenny Palmqvist (Sweden)

12 March 2014 Seventh place match	Australia	5–2	Italy	Paralimni, Cyprus
14:00 EET	Kerr 17' van Egmond 22', 38'; Gorry 56'; Raso 79'	Report	Tuttino 86'; Panico 90+1'	Stadium: Tasos Markos Stadium

==== AFC Women's Asian Cup ====
14 May 2014 Group Stage	Australia	2–2	Japan	Ho Chi Minh City, Vietnam
20:15 ICT	Foord 21'; De Vanna 64'	Report	Polkinghorne 71' (o.g.); Ōgimi 84'	Stadium: Thống Nhất Stadium; Attendance: 2,000; Referee: Qin Liang (China)

16 May 2014 Group Stage	Jordan	1–3	Australia	Ho Chi Minh City, Vietnam
17:15 ICT	Al-Naber 71'	Report	Gill 36', 51'; Gorry 67'	Stadium: Thống Nhất Stadium; Attendance: 1,200; Referee: Ri Hyang-Ok (North Korea)

18 May 2014 Group Stage	Vietnam	0–2	Australia	Ho Chi Minh City, Vietnam
19:15 ICT		Report	Thương 42' (o.g.); Gorry 90'	Stadium: Thống Nhất Stadium; Attendance: 3,000; Referee: Pannipar Kamnueng (Thailand)

22 May 2014 Semi-final	South Korea	1–2	Australia	Ho Chi Minh City, Vietnam
20:45 ICT	Park 53' (pen.)	Report	Gorry 47'; Kellond-Knight 77'	Stadium: Thống Nhất Stadium; Attendance: 700; Referee: Rita Gani (Malaysia)

25 May 2014 Final	Japan	1–0	Australia	Ho Chi Minh City, Vietnam
20:15 ICT	Iwashimizu 28'	Report		Stadium: Thống Nhất Stadium; Attendance: 10,000; Referee: Qin Liang (China)

=== Women's under 20 ===
==== Friendlies ====
25 July 2013	New Zealand	2–1	Australia	Auckland, New Zealand
15:00 NZST	Lee 1' (?)	Report	Whitfield 85'	Stadium: Kristin School; Attendance: 0 (Behind closed doors)

27 July 2013	New Zealand	0–4	Australia	Auckland, New Zealand
14:30 NZST		Report	Caceras 5'; Merrin 9' (o.g.); Andrews 60'; Bass 90'	Stadium: Kiwitea Street

29 July 2013	New Zealand	0–0	Australia	Auckland, New Zealand
14:30 NZST		Report		Stadium: Seddon Fields

==== AFF Women's Championship ====
11 September 2013 Group Stage	Malaysia	0–1	Australia	Yangon, Myanmar
15:30 MST		Report	Whitfield 76'	Stadium: Thuwunna Stadium; Referee: Law Bik Chi (Hong Kong)

13 September 2013 Group Stage	Australia	5–1	Jordan	Yangon, Myanmar
15:30 MST	Raso 5', 65'; Andrews 10', 20'; Logarzo 78'	Report	Jebreen 21'	Stadium: Thuwunna Stadium; Referee: Sein Hlaing (Myanmar)

15 September 2013 Group Stage	Thailand	2–3	Australia	Yangon, Myanmar
19:30 MST	Wilaiporn 43'; Taneekarn 48'	Report	Raso 27', 57'; Harrison 41'	Stadium: Thuwunna Stadium; Referee: Thein Thein Aye (Myanmar)

17 September 2013 Group Stage	Vietnam	0–0	Australia	Yangon, Myanmar
16:00 MST		Report		Stadium: Thuwunna Stadium; Referee: Rita Gani (Malaysia)

September 2013 Semi-final	Australia	2–1	Myanmar	Yangon, Myanmar
15:30 MST	Tobin 15'; Yeoman-Dale 77'	Report	Khin Moe Wai 1'	Stadium: Thuwunna Stadium; Attendance: 3,000; Referee: Mai Hoang Trang (Vietnam)

22 September 2013 Final	Australia	1–1 (a.e.t.) (3–5 p)	Japan	Yangon, Myanmar
18:45 MST	Tobin 21'	Report	Saga 49'	Stadium: Thuwunna Stadium; Referee: Mai Hoang Trang (Vietnam)
	Penalties
	Yeoman-Dale (penalty scored); Carroll (penalty scored); Caceres (penalty scored); Wheeler (penalty missed)		(penalty scored) Takahashi; (penalty scored) Saga; (penalty scored) Tanaka; (penalty scored) Mitsuhashi; (penalty scored) Imai

==== AFC U-19 Women's Championship ====
11 October 2013	North Korea	6–2	Australia	Nanjing, China
16:30 CST	P. H. Kim 2'; S. H. Kim 13', 52'; Ri 67', 70', 84'	Report	Logarzo 39'; Raso 77'	Stadium: Jiangsu Football Training Base Stadium; Attendance: 81; Referee: Qin Liang (China)

13 October 2013	Australia	0–2	Japan	Nanjing, China
14:00 CST		Report	Hasegawa 49'; Sumida 80'	Stadium: Jiangning Sports Center; Attendance: 120; Referee: Ri Hyang Ok (North Korea)

15 October 2013	Australia	1–2	China	Nanjing, China
16:30 CST	Raso 47'	Report	Wang Shuang 78', 79'	Stadium: Jiangning Sports Center; Attendance: 130; Referee: Pannipar Kamnueng (Thailand)

18 October 2013	Myanmar	0–2	Australia	Nanjing, China
14:00 CST		Report	Harrison 50'; Whitfield 51'	Stadium: Jiangsu Football Training Base Stadium; Attendance: 61; Referee: Maria Rebello (India)

20 October 2013	Australia	1–2	South Korea	Nanjing, China
14:00 CST	Yeoman-Dale 33'	Report	Jang 20'; Lee 41' (pen.)	Stadium: Jiangsu Football Training Base Stadium; Attendance: 60; Referee: Qin Liang (China)

=== Women's under 17 ===
==== Friendlies ====
11 August 2013	Australia	2–1	New Zealand	Canberra, Australia
	Franco (?); Waterhouse (?)	Report	(?)	Stadium: Australian Institute of Sport; Attendance: 0 (Behind closed doors)

14 August 2013	Australia	0–0	New Zealand	Canberra, Australia
		Report		Stadium: AIS Athletics Arena

17 August 2013	Australia	6–0	New Zealand	Canberra, Australia
	McGladrigan 11'; Franco 28', 50'; Beard 45'; Chidiac 60'; Waterhouse (?)	Report		Stadium: Australian Institute of Sport

==== AFC U-16 Women's Championship ====
28 September 2013 Group Stage	Australia	8–0	Australia	Nanjing, China
16:30 CST	Pollicina 19'; Stockdale 22'; Pitts 24'; Mcgladrigan 35'; Franco 64', 74', 85'; Chidiac 83'	Report		Stadium: Jiangning Sports Center; Attendance: 100; Referee: Kim Sookhee (South Korea)

30 September 2013 Group Stage	China	2–0	Australia	Nanjing, China
16:30 CST	Cui 31'; Fan 35'	Report		Stadium: Jiangning Sports Center; Attendance: 126; Referee: Fusako Kajiyama (Japan)
