= 2013–14 Adelaide United FC (women) season =

Adelaide United (W-League)
2013–14 season
- Chairman: Greg Griffin
- Head Coach: Ross Aloisi
- W-League: 6th
- W-League Finals: DNQ
- Top goalscorer: Kristy Moore (3)
- Biggest win: 3–1 vs. Newcastle Jets (H) (30 November 2013); W-League; 2–0 vs. Canberra United (H) (5 January 2014); W-League
- Biggest defeat: 0–3 vs. Canberra United (A) (19 January 2024); W-League
Home colours	Away colours

The 2013–14 season was Adelaide United Football Club's sixth season in the W-League. Adelaide United finished 6th in their W-League season.

== Players ==
Note: Flags indicate national team as defined under FIFA eligibility rules; some limited exceptions apply. Players may hold more than one non-FIFA nationality.

No.	Pos.	Nation	Player
1	GK	AUS	Melissa Barbieri
2	MF	AUS	Bianca Gray
3	DF	AUS	Alexandra Gummer
4	MF	AUS	Tegan Riding
5	DF	AUS	Jessie Wharepouri
6	MF	ENG	Laura Stockdale
7	FW	AUS	Racheal Quigley
8	MF	AUS	Emily Condon
9	MF	NOR	Lisa-Marie Woods
10	MF	AUS	Monique Iannella
11	MF	AUS	Isabel Hodgson

No.	Pos.	Nation	Player
12	DF	AUS	Daila Tais-Borg
14	MF	AUS	Jayah Brown
15	DF	AUS	Jenna McCormick
16	MF	AUS	Jessica Waterhouse
17	FW	AUS	Tiarn Powell
18	MF	AUS	Jessica Nagel
19	MF	AUS	Daniela Di Bartolo
20	GK	AUS	Kelly Barltrop
21	MF	AUS	Sneź Veljanovska
23	FW	ENG	Kristy Moore (Captain)
24	FW	SCO	Louise Mason

=== Transfers in ===
Note: Flags indicate national team as defined under FIFA eligibility rules; some limited exceptions apply. Players may hold more than one non-FIFA nationality.

No.	Pos.	Nation	Player
1	GK	AUS	Melissa Barbieri (from (Australia) Newcastle Jets)
2	MF	AUS	Bianca Gray (from (Australia) Sturt Marion WSC)
3	DF	AUS	Alexandra Gummer (from (Australia) Casey Comets)
4	MF	AUS	Tegan Riding (from (Australia) Redlands United)
6	MF	ENG	Laura Stockdale (from (United States) LA Strikers)
8	MF	AUS	Emily Condon (from (Australia) FFSA U14/15 Girls)
10	MF	AUS	Monique Iannella (from (Australia) Adelaide City)
11	MF	AUS	Isabel Hodgson (from (Australia) Fulham United)
12	DF	AUS	Daila Tais-Borg (from (Australia) North West Sydney Koalas)
14	MF	AUS	Jayah Brown (from (Australia) QAS)
17	FW	AUS	Tiarn Powell (from (Australia) Manly United)
18	MF	AUS	Jessica Nagel (from (Australia) Adelaide City)
9	MF	NOR	Lisa-Marie Woods (from (Norway) LSK Kvinner)
19	MF	AUS	Daniela Di Bartolo (from (Australia) Adelaide City)
21	MF	AUS	Sneź Veljanovska (from (United States) Santa Clarita Blue Heat)
24	FW	SCO	Louise Mason (from (Scotland) Spartans)

=== Transfers out ===
Note: Flags indicate national team as defined under FIFA eligibility rules; some limited exceptions apply. Players may hold more than one non-FIFA nationality.

No.	Pos.	Nation	Player
1	GK	AUS	Kristi Harvey (to (Australia) Metro United Women's Football Club)
2	DF	AUS	Ruth Wallace
3	DF	AUS	Alex Natoli (to (Australia) Melbourne Victory)
5	DF	NZL	Abby Erceg (to (Germany) FF USV Jena)
6	MF	AUS	Cassie Tsoumbris (to (Australia) Box Hill United)
8	MF	NZL	Sarah McLaughlin (to (New Zealand) Claudelands Rovers)
9	FW	AUS	Marijana Rajcic (to (Australia) Box Hill United)
11	DF	AUS	Grace Henry (to (Australia) Sydney University)
12	DF	AUS	Elise Whorlow
13	MF	AUS	Ann Mayo (to (Australia) Tuggeranong United)
14	MF	AUS	Lorena Maggio
15	DF	AUS	Emma Checker (to (Australia) Melbourne Victory)
17	MF	AUS	Laura Johns (to (Australia) Adelaide University)
18	MF	AUS	Georgia Macri (to (Australia) Fulham United)
19	MF	NZL	Holly Patterson (to (United States) Dartmouth College)

== Technical staff ==
Position	Name
Head coach	(Australia) Ross Aloisi
Assistant coach	(Australia) Geoff Hargreaves
Assistant coach	(Australia) Paul Pezos
Assistant coach	(Australia) Joel Porter
Assistant coach	(Australia) Tracey Jenkins
Goalkeeper coach	(Australia) Neil Tate
Conditioning Coach	(Australia) Nik Hagicostas
Doctor	(Australia) James Ilic
Physiotherapist	(Australia) Marieke Cornielissen
Physiotherapist	(Australia) Harry Roesch
Sports trainer	(Australia) Carol Goddard

== Squad statistics ==
=== Disciplinary record ===
N	Pos.	Nat.	Name	Yellow card	Second yellow card	Red card	Notes
1	GK	(Australia)	Melissa Barbieri	2	0	0	
2	MF	(Australia)	Bianca Gray	0	0	0	
3	DF	(Australia)	Alexandra Gummer	0	0	0	
4	MF	(Australia)	Tegan Riding	0	0	0	
5	DF	(Australia)	Jessie Wharepouri	0	0	0	
6	MF	(England)	Laura Stockdale	2	0	0	
7	FW	(Australia)	Racheal Quigley	0	0	0	
8	MF	(Australia)	Emily Condon	0	0	0	
9	MF	(Norway)	Lisa-Marie Woods	3	0	0	
10	MF	(Australia)	Monique Iannella	0	0	0	
11	MF	(Australia)	Isabel Hodgson	0	0	0	
12	DF	(Australia)	Daila Tais-Borg	1	0	0	
14	MF	(Australia)	Jayah Brown	0	0	0	
15	DF	(Australia)	Jenna McCormick	1	0	0	
16	MF	(Australia)	Jessica Waterhouse	1	0	0	
17	FW	(Australia)	Tiarn Powell	0	0	0	
18	MF	(Australia)	Jessica Nagel	0	0	0	
19	MF	(Australia)	Daniela Di Bartolo	0	0	0	
20	GK	(Australia)	Kelly Barltrop	0	0	0	
21	MF	(Australia)	Sneź Veljanovska	2	0	0	
23	FW	(England)	Kristy Moore	1	0	0	
24	FW	(Scotland)	Louis3 Mason	1	0	0	

Last updated: 10 February 2014
Source: Competitive matches
Only competitive matches
(yellow card) = Number of bookings; (second yellow card) = Number of sending offs after a second yellow card; (red card) = Number of sending offs by a direct red card.

=== Goal scorers ===
Total	Player		Goals per Round											
Total	Player		1	2	3	4	5	6	7	8	9	10	11	12
3	(England)	Kristy Moore										1		2
2	(Australia)	Alexandra Gummer	1		1									
2	(Australia)	Tiarn Powell			2									
2	(Australia)	Emily Condon								1			1	
1	(Australia)	Daniela Di Bartolo					1							
1	(Norway)	Lisa-Marie Woods							1					
1	(Australia)	Racheal Quigley							1					
12	TOTAL		1	0	3	0	1	0	2	1	0	1	1	2

== Competitions ==
=== Overall record ===
Competition	First match	Last match	Starting round	Final position	Record							
Competition	First match	Last match	Starting round	Final position	Pld	W	D	L	GF	GA	GD	Win %
W-League	10 November 2013	8 February 2014	Matchday 1	6th	12	3	4	5	12	15	−3	25.00
Total					12	3	4	5	12	15	−3	25.00

Source: Competitions

=== W-League ===
==== League table ====
Pos	Team	Pld	W	D	L	GF	GA	GD	Pts	Qualification
1	Canberra United	12	9	0	3	28	8	+20	27	Qualification to Finals series
2	Sydney FC	12	8	2	2	37	14	+23	26	Qualification to Finals series
3	Melbourne Victory (C)	12	7	2	3	23	12	+11	23	Qualification to Finals series
4	Brisbane Roar	12	7	2	3	22	16	+6	23	Qualification to Finals series
5	Perth Glory	12	5	0	7	17	31	−14	15	
6	Adelaide United	12	3	4	5	12	15	−3	13	
7	Western Sydney Wanderers	12	2	3	7	17	23	−6	9	
8	Newcastle Jets	12	0	1	11	10	47	−37	1	

Source: au.soccerway.com
Rules for classification: 1) points; 2) goal difference; 3) number of goals scored.
(C) Champions

==== Results summary ====
Overall								Home						Away					
Pld	W	D	L	GF	GA	GD	Pts	W	D	L	GF	GA	GD	W	D	L	GF	GA	GD
12	3	4	5	12	15	−3	13	2	2	2	8	7	+1	1	2	3	4	8	−4

Source: worldfootball.net

==== Results by round ====
Round	1	2	3	4	5	6	7	8	9	10	11	12
Ground	A	H	H	A	A	A	H	H	A	H	H	A
Result	D	L	W	L	W	L	W	D	L	L	D	D
Position	4	6	5	6	5	6	5	5	5	5	5	6
Points	1	1	4	4	7	7	10	11	11	11	12	13

Source: worldfootball.net
A = Away; H = Home; W = Win; D = Draw; L = Loss

==== Matches ====
The league fixtures were announced on 2 September 2013.

Win Draw Loss

10 November 2013 1	Western Sydney Wanderers	1–1	Adelaide United	Sydney
14:00 AEDT	Cannuli 90+2'	Report	Gummer 31'	Stadium: Marconi Stadium; Referee: Rebecca Durcau

16 November 2013 2	Adelaide United	0–2	Melbourne Victory	Adelaide
14:00 ACDT		Report	De Vanna 40' (pen.); Friend 59'	Stadium: Burton Park; Referee: Kelly Jones

30 November 2013 3	Adelaide United	3–1	Newcastle Jets	Adelaide
15:00 ACDT	Powell 25', 32'; Gummer 30'	Report	Courtenay 90'	Stadium: Burton Park; Referee: Lara Lee

7 December 2013 4	Perth Glory	1–0	Adelaide United	Perth
17:00 AWST	Sutton 89'	Report		Stadium: Percy Doyle Reserve; Referee: Rebecca Durcau

15 December 2013 5	Brisbane Roar	0–1	Adelaide United	Brisbane
14:00 AEST		Report	Di Bartolo 73'	Stadium: Queensland Sport and Athletics Centre; Referee: Kate Jacewicz

21 December 2013 6	Melbourne Victory	1–0	Adelaide United	Melbourne
15:00 AEDT	De Vanna 83'	Report		Stadium: Kingston Heath Soccer Complex; Referee: Katie Patterson

5 January 2014 7	Adelaide United	2–0	Canberra United	Adelaide
15:00 ACDT	Woods 10'; Quigley 13' (pen.)	Report		Stadium: Burton Park; Referee: Casey Reibelt

11 January 2014 8	Adelaide United	1–1	Western Sydney Wanderers	Adelaide
14:30 ACDT	Condon 70'	Report	Carney 90+6'	Stadium: Burton Park; Referee: Rebecca Durcau

19 January 2014 9	Canberra United	3–0	Adelaide United	Canberra
15:00 AEDT	Heyman 16'; Ochs 32'; Sykes 61'	Report		Stadium: McKellar Park; Attendance: 724; Referee: Casey Reibelt

24 January 2014 10	Adelaide United	1–2	Sydney FC	Adelaide
20:00 ACDT	Moore 52'	Report	Taylor 24'; Harrison 90+5'	Stadium: Adelaide Shores Football Centre; Attendance: 1,006; Referee: Lara Lee

1 February 2014 11	Adelaide United	1–1	Brisbane Roar	Adelaide
19:30 ACDT	Condon 87'	Report	Gielnik 64'	Stadium: Adelaide Shores Football Centre; Referee: Kirralee Andruschak
Note: Match originally scheduled for 14:00 ACDT, but delayed due to scheduling of matches ahead of the W-League Finals. It was rescheduled for 19:30 ACDT.

8 February 2014 12	Newcastle Jets	2–2	Adelaide United	Newcastle
15:00 AEDT	Beard 32'; Simon 90+1'	Report	Moore 10', 29'	Stadium: Wanderers Oval; Referee: Katie Patterson

== Awards ==
- Player of the Week (Round 5) – Lisa-Marie Woods
- W-League keeper of the year – Melissa Barbieri
