= 2013 AFF U-16 Youth Championship =

2013 AFF U-16 Youth Championship ၂၀၁၃ အာဆီယံ လူငယ်ချန်ပီယံရှစ် (U-16)
Tournament details
- Host country: Myanmar
- City: Naypyidaw
- Dates: 20 August – 2 September
- Teams: 10 (from 1 sub-confederation)
- Venue: 1 (in 1 host city)

Final positions
- Champions: Malaysia (1st title)
- Runners-up: Indonesia
- Third place: Australia
- Fourth place: Vietnam

Tournament statistics
- Matches played: 24
- Goals scored: 102 (4.25 per match)
- Top scorer(s): (Australia) Cameron Joice (Vietnam) Bạch Hồng Hân (6 goals)

The 2013 AFF U-16 Youth Championship is the 9th edition of the AFF U-16 Youth Championship, organised by the ASEAN Football Federation for the men's under-16 national teams of Southeast Asia. It was hosted in Myanmar, and was played between 20 August to 2 September 2013. A total of 10 teams will play in the tournament.

Malaysia beat Indonesia 3–2 through penalty shoot-out in the final for their first title in the championship.

== Participant teams ==
All eleven member associations of the ASEAN Football Federation were set to take part in the tournament but Thailand and Timor-Leste withdrew. Australia was invited by the AFF, they were omitted and the AFF reverted to two groups featuring five teams.

== Venues ==
Naypyidaw
Wunna Theikdi Stadium
Capacity: 30,000
(new stadium)
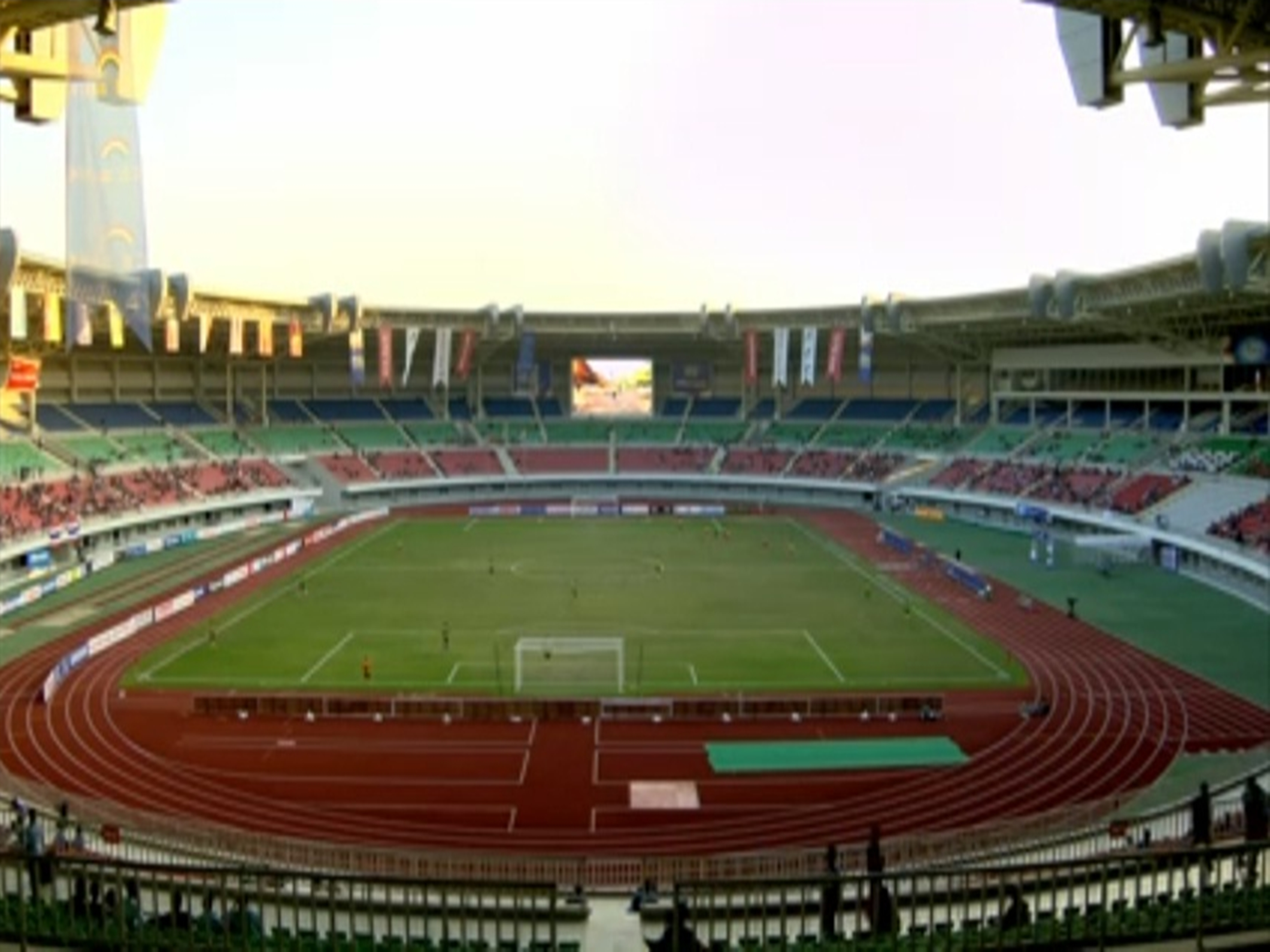

== Group stage ==
The official draw was made on the twenty-seventh of February 2013. Thailand and Timor-Leste withdrew. Australia was invited by the AFF. The group stage consisted of 2 groups of 5 teams with the top 2 of each group qualifying for the semi-finals.

=== Group A ===
Team	Pld	W	D	L	GF	GA	GD	Pts
Australia	4	4	0	0	28	0	+28	12
Vietnam	4	3	0	1	21	3	+18	9
Myanmar	4	2	0	2	7	7	0	6
Cambodia	4	1	0	3	9	12	−3	3
Brunei	4	0	0	4	0	43	−43	0

20 August 2013
16:00

Australia	4 – 0	Cambodia
Bandiera 4', 34'; Dimitroff 15'; Maskin 83'	Report

Wunna Theikdi Stadium, Naypyidaw
Referee: Steve Supresencia (Philippines)
20 August 2013
18:45

Myanmar	0 – 4	Vietnam
	Report	Phạm Trọng Hóa 3'; Bạch Hồng Hân 28', 48', 90'

Wunna Theikdi Stadium, Naypyidaw
Referee: Mongkolchai Pechsri (Thailand)

22 August 2013
16:00

Cambodia	8 – 0	Brunei
Senteang 3', 44', 47', 89'; Syakirin 32' (o.g.); Ravan 45+1', 57'; Phearat 78'	Report

Wunna Theikdi Stadium, Naypyidaw
Referee: Mongkolchai Pechsri (Thailand)
22 August 2013
18:45

Australia	2 – 0	Myanmar
Maskin 30'; Mendez 63'	Report

Wunna Theikdi Stadium, Naypyidaw
Referee: Xaypaseuth Phongsanit (Laos)

24 August 2013
16:00

Brunei	0 – 19	Australia
	Report	Petratos 9', 88', 89'; McGree 12', 19', 82'; Bandiera 22'; De Godoy 26'; Dimitroff 33'; Joice 38', 51', 57', 78', 84', 90+1'; Mendez 65', 70', 73'; Verbi 90'

Wunna Theikdi Stadium, Naypyidaw
Referee: Steve Supresencia (Philippines)
24 August 2013
18:45

Vietnam	6 – 0	Cambodia
Bạch Hồng Hân 39', 48', 88'; Hoàng Thế Tài 54'; Lê Tiến Anh 70'; Nguyễn Đoàn Trung Nhân 90+3'	Report

Wunna Theikdi Stadium, Naypyidaw
Referee: Xaypaseuth Phongsanit (Laos)

26 August 2013
16:00

Australia	3 – 0	Vietnam
Maskin 18'; Bandiera 66', 86'	Report

Wunna Theikdi Stadium, Naypyidaw
Referee: Mongkolchai Pechsri (Thailand)
26 August 2013
18:45

Myanmar	5 – 0	Brunei
Ye Yint Aung 8'; Ye Yint Ko 18'; Min Thu 35'; Yuzlin 45+2' (o.g.); Oakkar Bo 85'	Report

Wunna Theikdi Stadium, Naypyidaw
Referee: Steve Supresencia (Philippines)

28 August 2013
16:00

Vietnam	11 – 0	Brunei
Hoàng Thế Tài 7', 90+3'; Nguyễn Đoàn Trung Nhân 8', 90'; Nguyễn Văn Huy 10', 40', 70', 82'; Bùi Tiến Dụng 26'; Đặng Văn Danh 72'; Nguyễn Hữu Tuân 89'	Report

Wunna Theikdi Stadium, Naypyidaw
Referee: Xaypaseuth Phongsanit (Laos)
28 August 2013
18:45

Cambodia	1 – 2	Myanmar
Sovann 90+3'	Report	Sa Aung Pyea Ko 11'; Nquet 81' (o.g.)

Wunna Theikdi Stadium, Naypyidaw
Referee: Steve Supresencia (Philippines)

=== Group B ===
Team	Pld	W	D	L	GF	GA	GD	Pts
Malaysia	4	2	2	0	11	2	+9	8
Indonesia	4	2	2	0	7	1	+6	8
Singapore	4	1	2	1	6	6	0	5
Laos	4	1	0	3	5	11	−6	3
Philippines	4	1	0	3	1	10	−9	3

21 August 2013
16:00

Indonesia	4 – 0	Laos
Riyanto 29'; Gatot 36'; Dimas 51'; Habel 71'	Report

Wunna Theikdi Stadium, Naypyidaw
Referee: Duc Vu Nguyen (Vietnam)
21 August 2013
18:45

Philippines	0 – 6	Malaysia
	Report	Kogi 13', 85'; Hafiy 28'; Shahrul Akmal 51', 78'; Dinesh 90+2'

Wunna Theikdi Stadium, Naypyidaw
Referee: Vichhika Tuy (Cambodia)

23 August 2013
16:00

Malaysia	1 – 1	Singapore
Nur-firman 22'	Report	Zulqarnaen 42'

Wunna Theikdi Stadium, Naypyidaw
Referee: Hla Min (Myanmar)
23 August 2013
18:45

Philippines	0 – 2	Indonesia
	Report	Gatot 33'; Riyanto 76'

Wunna Theikdi Stadium, Naypyidaw
Referee: Win Htut (Myanmar)

25 August 2013
16:00

Singapore	2 – 0	Philippines
Zulqarnaen 45'; Syukri 60'	Report

Wunna Theikdi Stadium, Naypyidaw
Referee: Duc Vu Nguyen (Vietnam)
25 August 2013
18:45

Laos	1 – 4	Malaysia
Phanvongsa 45'	Report	Firdaus 48'; Najmuddin 57', 74', 90+1'

Wunna Theikdi Stadium, Naypyidaw
Referee: Vichhika Tuy (Cambodia)

27 August 2013
16:00

Philippines	1 – 0	Laos
Borlongan 88'	Report

Wunna Theikdi Stadium, Naypyidaw
Referee: Hla Min (Myanmar)
27 August 2013
18:45

Indonesia	1 – 1	Singapore
Arif 55'	Report	Zulqarnaen 23'

Wunna Theikdi Stadium, Naypyidaw
Referee: Win Htut (Myanmar)

29 August 2013
16:00

Malaysia	0 – 0	Indonesia
	Report

Wunna Theikdi Stadium, Naypyidaw
Referee: Hla Min (Myanmar)
29 August 2013
16:00

Laos	4 – 2	Singapore
Phanvongsa 35', 70'; Keohanam 44'; Sisongkham 80'	Report	Syukri 9'; Ameer 88'

Zeyar Thiri Stadium, Naypyidaw
Referee: Duc Vu Nguyen (Vietnam)

== Knockout stage ==
=== Bracket ===
Semi-finals
31 August – Naypyidaw (Wunna Theikdi)
Australia	2 (4)
Indonesia (p)	2 (5)
31 August – Naypyidaw (Wunna Theikdi)
Malaysia	1
Vietnam	0

Final
2 September – Naypyidaw (Wunna Theikdi)
Indonesia	1 (2)
Malaysia (p)	1 (3)
Third place
2 September – Naypyidaw (Wunna Theikdi)
Australia (p)	0 (7)
Vietnam	0 (6)

=== Semi-finals ===
31 August 2013
16:00

Australia	2 – 2	Indonesia
Reiners 31'; Petratos 67'	Report	Gatot 56'; Reksa 80'
Penalties
Petratos (penalty scored); Reiners (penalty missed); Maskin (penalty scored); Kim (penalty scored); Verbi (penalty scored)	4 – 5	(penalty scored) Radja; (penalty scored) Samuel; (penalty scored) Anang; (penalty scored) Reksa; (penalty scored) Asnawi

Wunna Theikdi Stadium, Naypyidaw
Referee: Win Htut (Myanmar)
31 August 2013
18:45

Malaysia	1 – 0	Vietnam
Dinesh 70'	Report

Wunna Theikdi Stadium, Naypyidaw
Referee: Vichhika Tuy (Cambodia)

=== Third place play-off ===
2 September 2013
16:00

Australia	0 – 0	Vietnam
	Report
Penalties
Dimitroff (penalty scored); Petratos (penalty scored); Bandiera (penalty scored); Caletti (penalty scored); Maskin (penalty scored); Panetta (penalty scored); Fotakopoulos (penalty scored); Verbi (penalty missed)	(this list not in chronological order) 7 – 6	(penalty scored) Lê Thanh Phong; (penalty scored) Phạm Trọng Hóa; (penalty scored) Lê Tiến Anh; (penalty scored) Bạch Hồng Hân; (penalty scored) Đặng Văn Danh; (penalty scored) Nguyễn Văn Huy; (penalty missed) Hoàng Thế Tài; (penalty missed) Bùi Tiến Dụng

Wunna Theikdi Stadium, Naypyidaw
Referee: Vichhika Tuy (Cambodia)

=== Final ===
2 September 2013
18:45

Indonesia	1 – 1	Malaysia
Gatot 28'	Report	Shahrul Adnan 89' (pen.)
Penalties
Radja (penalty missed); Samuel (penalty scored); Anang (penalty scored); Reksa (penalty missed); Asnawi (penalty missed); Gatot (penalty missed)	2 – 3	(penalty missed) Hafiy; (penalty missed) Ghaffar; (penalty missed) Ali Imran; (penalty scored) Dinesh; (penalty scored) Shahrul Adnan; (penalty scored) Haziq

Wunna Theikdi Stadium, Naypyidaw
Referee: Mongkolchai Pechsri (Thailand)

== Winner ==
2013 AFF U-16 Youth Championship Winners
(Malaysia)
Malaysia
First title

== Goalscorers ==
6 goals

- (Australia) Cameron Joice
- (Vietnam) Bach Hong Han

5 goals

- (Australia) Jackson Bandiera

4 goals

- (Australia) Gian Mendez
- (Australia) Kosta Petratos
- (Cambodia) Chhuot Senteang
- (Indonesia) Gatot Wahyudi
- (Vietnam) Nguyen Van Huy

3 goals

- (Australia) Daniel Maskin
- (Australia) Riley McGree
- (Laos) Sinthanong Phanvongsa
- (Malaysia) M. Kogilaswaran
- (Malaysia) Muhammad Najmuddin Samat
- (Singapore) Muhammad Zulqarnaen Suzliman
- (Vietnam) Hoang The Thai
- (Vietnam) Nguyen Doan Trung Nhan

2 goals

- (Australia) Jamie Dimitroff
- (Cambodia) Kunthea Ravan
- (Indonesia) Riyanto
- (Malaysia) Dinesh Rajasingam
- (Malaysia) Muhamad Shahrul Akmal
- (Singapore) Muhammad Syukri Mohd Bashir

1 goal

- (Australia) Caio de Godoy
- (Australia) Christian Verbi
- (Australia) Jamal Reiners
- (Cambodia) Long Phearat
- (Cambodia) Ouk Sovann
- (Indonesia) Dimas Ahmad
- (Indonesia) Habel Siegers
- (Indonesia) Habib Arif Fadhilla
- (Indonesia) Reksa Maulana
- (Laos) Laithaya Sisongkham
- (Laos) Somxay Keohanam
- (Malaysia) Abang Nur-firman Abang Norazman
- (Malaysia) Ahmad Firdaus Ismail
- (Malaysia) Muhammad Hafiy Haikal
- (Malaysia) Muhammad Shahrul Adnan
- (Myanmar) Min Thu
- (Myanmar) Oakkar Bo
- (Myanmar) Sa Aung Pyea Ko
- (Myanmar) Ye Yint Aung
- (Myanmar) Ye Yint Ko
- (Philippines) Jeremiah Borlongan
- (Singapore) Ameer Hakeen
- (Vietnam) Bùi Tiến Dụng
- (Vietnam) Dang Van Danh
- (Vietnam) Le Tien Anh
- (Vietnam) Nguyen Huu Tuan
- (Vietnam) Pham Trong Hoa

1 own goal

- (Brunei) Mohammad Syakirin Misli (playing against Cambodia)
- (Brunei) Muhammad Yuzlin Ishak (playing against Myanmar)
- (Cambodia) Suon Nquet (playing against Myanmar)
