= Bùi Tiến Dũng (footballer, born 1997) =

Vietnamese footballer

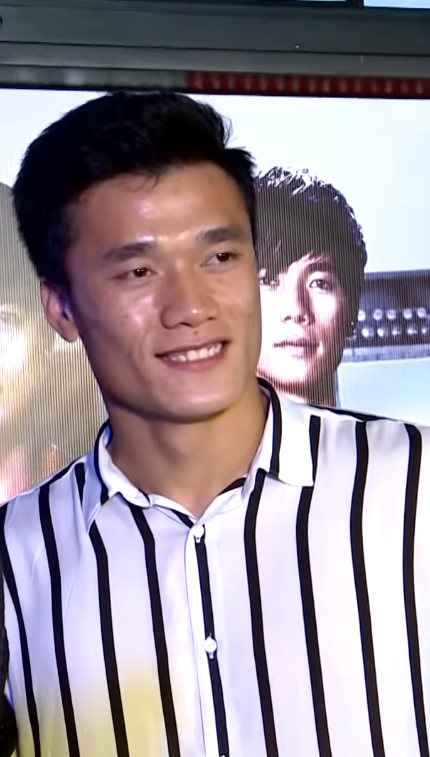
- Bùi Tiến Dũng in 2018

Personal information
- Full name: Bùi Tiến Dũng
- Date of birth: 28 February 1997 (age 29)
- Place of birth: Ngọc Lặc, Thanh Hóa, Vietnam
- Height: 1.81 m (5 ft 11 in)
- Position: Goalkeeper

Team information
- Current team: SHB Đà Nẵng
- Number: 91

Youth career
- 2013–2017: Thanh Hóa
- 2017: → Becamex Binh Duong (loan)

Senior career*
Years	Team	Apps	(Gls)
2017–2018	FLC Thanh Hóa	19	(0)
2019	Hà Nội	3	(0)
2020–2022	Hồ Chí Minh City	22	(0)
2023–2024	Công An Hà Nội	3	(0)
2024	→ Hoàng Anh Gia Lai (loan)	8	(0)
2024	Hồ Chí Minh City	1	(0)
2025–	SHB Đà Nẵng	20	(1)

International career
2016–2017	Vietnam U20	14	(0)
2017–2020	Vietnam U23	21	(0)
2018	Vietnam	1	(0)
Medal record
Men's football
Representing Vietnam
AFF Championship
Winner	2018 ASEAN
AFC U-23 Championship
Runner-up	2018 China
SEA Games
Gold medal – first place	2019 Philippines
- * Club domestic league appearances and goals as of 20 October 2025

Bùi Tiến Dũng (born 28 February 1997) is a Vietnamese professional footballer who plays as a goalkeeper for V.League 1 club SHB Đà Nẵng. Dũng was domestically regarded as one of the best goalkeepers in the country at his peak.

== Club career ==
Born in Thanh Hoá Province, Tiến Dũng is a youth product of his local team Thanh Hóa FC. He was promoted to the first team in 2017 and made his professional debut in the 2017 V.League 1.

In 2019, he joined Hà Nội FC, where he was the back up goalkeeper for Nguyễn Văn Công. In his only season with the team, he made five appearances including three in V.League 1 matches and two in the AFC Cup, winning the league title and the national cup with his team.

In January 2020, Tiến Dũng signed for Hồ Chí Minh City, signing a three-year contract. In December 2022, he terminated his contract with the club to search for game time.

In January 2023, Tiến Dũng joined Công An Hà Nội. He only made one appearance during the 2023 V.League 1 season as his team won the league title.

In February 2024, in search for more game time, Tiến Dũng joined V.League 1 fellow LPBank HAGL on a loan deal until the end of the season.

On 26 December 2024, SHB Đà Nẵng announced the arrival of Tiến Dũng to the team with a contract until June 2026.

On 10 May 2025, just one week after conceding 6 goals against The Cong-Viettel, he made a crucial impact by scoring in the 97th minute to put SHB Đà Nẵng 2–1 ahead of Bình Định. His goal helped secure a 3–1 victory, boosting the team's hopes of avoiding relegation.

== International career ==
Tiến Dũng was part of the Vietnam U19 squad that reached the semi-finals in the 2016 AFC U-19 Championship, thus qualified for the 2017 FIFA U-20 World Cup.

In 2017, he was named in Vietnam U20's squad for the 2017 FIFA U-20 World Cup. He started in all three group stage games, kept one clean sheet in the goalless draw against New Zealand and saved a penalty from Jean-Kévin Augustin in the 0–4 defeat against France, as Vietnam failed to reach the knockout stage and got eliminated from the group stage.

In January 2018, Tiến Dũng was included in Vietnam U23's 23-men squad for the 2018 AFC U-23 Championship. In the opening match against South Korea, he saved a panenka penalty shot by the opponent but failed to save the team from a 1–2 loss. In the next two group stage matches, he kept two clean sheets against Australia and Syria, playing an important role to help Vietnam qualify for the first time in their history to the tournament's quarter-finals. At the quarter-finals game against Iraq, Tiến Dũng saved Bashar Resan's attempt in the penalty shoot-out, helping Vietnam reach the semi-finals after the game had ended in a 3–3 draw after extra time. In the semi-final game against Qatar, U-23 Vietnam excelled in a 2-2 draw after extra time and sent the match to a penalty shootout. Tiến Dũng was once again the hero of his team after saving two penalties from Qatar players, helping the home team win 4-3 in the penalty shootout and advance to the final. However, in the final, Vietnam lost to Uzbekistan after conceding a last minute goal in the extra time and finished as runner-up. Aftermath, Tiến Dũng was considered a national hero by Vietnamese media and gained big popularity in Vietnam thanks to his outstanding performance and good penalty saving ability during Vietnam U23's historical campaign.

In November 2018, Tiến Dũng was part of Vietnam national team squad that won the 2018 AFF Championship, Vietnam's first title after 10 years. He was the team's third choice goalkeeper, thus didn't make any appearance during the tournament.

He made his international debut in a friendly game against North Korea on 25 December 2018 which ended in a 1–1 draw. Later, he was named in the squad for the 2019 AFC Asian Cup but didn't appear in any match.

== Personal life ==
Bùi Tiến Dũng has a younger brother named Bùi Tiến Dụng, who plays for Công An Hà Nội. Both participated in the 2018 AFC U-23 Championship. They were both hailed from a middle-class family of Muong ethnicity.

In July 2018, he traveled to Russia to award the "Man of the Match" prize to Croatia's international Ivan Perišić amidst the 2018 FIFA World Cup where Croatia beat England 2–1 in the semi-finals. He became the first ever Vietnamese to award this prize, based on his impressive performance in the U-23 Asian Cup held earlier.

On 22 May 2022, Bùi Tiến Dũng married Ukrainian model Dianka Zakhidova, and they have a son named Danil.

== Career statistics ==
=== Club ===
As of 20 September 2026

Appearances and goals by club, season and competition
Club	Season	League			National cup		Continental		Other		Total	
Club	Season	Division	Apps	Goals	Apps	Goals	Apps	Goals	Apps	Goals	Apps	Goals
FLC Thanh Hóa	2018	V.League 1	4	0	0	0	3 (Note: Appearances in AFC Cup)	0	–		7	0
Hà Nội	2019	V.League 1	3	0	0	0	2	0	–		5	0
Hồ Chí Minh City	2020	V.League 1	7	0	0	0	1	0	1 (Note: Appearance in Vietnamese Super Cup)	0	9	0
Hồ Chí Minh City	2021	V.League 1	2	0	0	0	–		–		2	0
Hồ Chí Minh City	2022	V.League 1	13	0	0	0	–		–		13	0
Hồ Chí Minh City	Total		22	0	0	0	1	0	1	0	24	0
Công An Hà Nội	2023	V.League 1	3	0	0	0	–		–		3	0
Công An Hà Nội	2023–24	V.League 1	15	0	0	0	–		0	0	15	0
Công An Hà Nội	Total		18	0	0	0	0	0	0	0	18	0
SHB Đà Nẵng	2024–25	V.League 1	16	1	0	0	–		1 (Note: Appearance in V.League 1 relegation play-offs)	0	17	1
SHB Đà Nẵng	2025–26	V.League 1	4	0	1	0	–		–		5	0
SHB Đà Nẵng	2026–27	V.League 1	0	0	1	0	–		–		1	0
SHB Đà Nẵng	Total		20	1	2	0	0	0	1	0	23	1
Career total			67	1	2	0	6	0	2	0	77	1

=== International ===
Appearances and goals by national team and year
National team	Year	Apps	Goals
Vietnam	2018	1	0
Total		1	0

== Honours ==
FLC Thanh Hóa

- Vietnamese National Cup runner-up: 2018

Hà Nội

- V.League 1: 2019
- Vietnamese National Cup: 2019
- Vietnamese Super Cup: 2019

Hồ Chí Minh City

- Vietnamese Super Cup runner-up: 2020

Công An Hà Nội

- V.League 1: 2023

Vietnam

- AFF Championship: 2018

Vietnam U23

- AFC U-23 Championship runner-up: 2018
- SEA Games gold medal: 2019
