= Bùi Tiến Dụng =

Vietnamese footballer (born 1998)

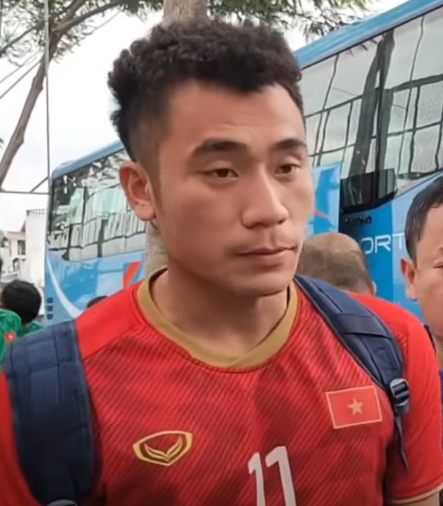
- Tiến Dụng in 2019

Personal information
- Full name: Bùi Tiến Dụng
- Date of birth: November 23, 1998 (age 27)
- Place of birth: Ngọc Lặc, Thanh Hóa, Vietnam
- Height: 1.80 m (5 ft 11 in)
- Position: Centre back

Team information
- Current team: Đồng Nai City
- Number: 68

Youth career
- 2012–2016: PVF Football Academy

Senior career*
Years	Team	Apps	(Gls)
2016–2017	→ Than Quảng Ninh (loan)	14	(0)
2017–2021	SHB Đà Nẵng	58	(1)
2022	Hải Phòng	23	(0)
2023–2024	Công An Hà Nội	36	(0)
2024–2026	Hải Phòng	43	(2)
2026–	Đồng Nai City	2	(0)

International career^{‡}
2015–2017	Vietnam U19	13	(1)
2017–2020	Vietnam U23	6	(0)
Medal record
Men's football
Representing Vietnam
AFC U-23 Championship
Runner-up	2018 China	Team
- * Club domestic league appearances and goals as of 12 September 2026 ‡ National team caps and goals as of 8 September 2019

Bùi Tiến Dụng (born 23 November 1998) is a Vietnamese professional footballer who plays as a centre back for V.League 1 club Đồng Nai City.

== Career ==
A graduate of the PVF Football Academy, Tiến Dụng began his career at Than Quảng Ninh, before joining SHB Đà Nẵng, where he remained for three seasons. He then moved to Hải Phòng, before signing for Công An Hà Nội, where he won the 2023 V.League 1. In 2024, he came back to Hải Phòng.

In July 2026, Tiến Dụng moved to newly promoted V.League 1 club Đồng Nai City.

== Personal life ==
He is younger brother of goalkeeper Bùi Tiến Dũng, who was his teammate at Cong An Hanoi.

== Honours ==
Than Quảng Ninh

- Vietnamese National Cup: 2016
- Vietnamese Super Cup: 2016

Công An Hà Nội

- V.League 1: 2023

Vietnam U23

- AFC U-23 Championship runners-up: 2018
- SEA Games gold medal: 2019
