= Nguyễn Thị Mai Hưng =

Vietnamese chess player (born 1994)

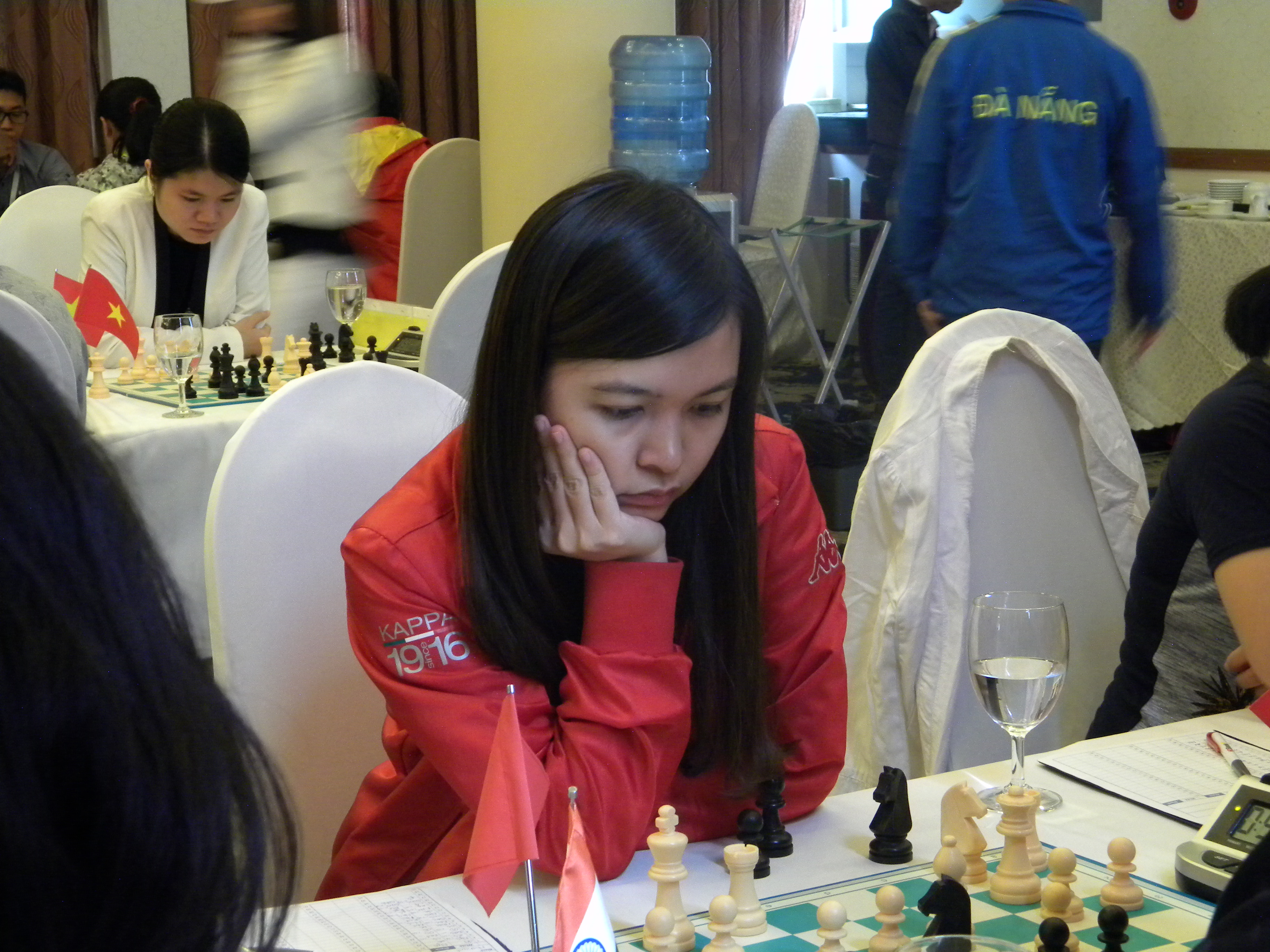
- Nguyễn Thị Mai Hưng in 2017

Personal information
- Born: 28 January 1994 (age 32) Bắc Giang, Vietnam

Chess career
- Country: Vietnam
- Title: Woman Grandmaster (2014)
- Peak rating: 2357 (October 2016)

Nguyễn Thị Mai Hưng (born 28 January 1994) is a Vietnamese chess player who holds the FIDE title of Woman Grandmaster (WGM, 2014). She is a Vietnamese Women's Chess Championship winner (2013), Women's Asian Team Chess Championship team gold winner (2009), World Women's Team Chess Championships individual gold winner (2011), and Asian Games bronze medalist (2010).

== Biography ==
Nguyễn Thị Mai Hưng is the youngest of three sisters in the family. She came to chess from the age of 7. In 2005, she won the Asian Youth Chess Championship in the U12 girl's age group. In 2007, Nguyễn Thị Mai Hưng won the Asian Youth Chess Championship in the U14 girl's age group. In 2010, she won the Asian Youth Chess Championship in the U16 girl's age group and ranked second in World Youth Chess Championship in the U16 girl's age group. In April 2013, Nguyễn Thị Mai Hưng won the Asian Junior Chess Championship in the U20 girl's age group. In 2013, she won Vietnamese Women's Chess Championship.

Nguyễn Thị Mai Hưng played for Vietnam in the Women's Chess Olympiads:

- In 2010, at third board in the 39th Chess Olympiad (women) in Khanty-Mansiysk (+3, =3, -2),
- In 2012, at second board in the 40th Chess Olympiad (women) in Istanbul (+6, =2, -3),
- In 2014, at first board in the 41st Chess Olympiad (women) in Tromsø (+2, =5, -3),
- In 2016, at third board in the 42nd Chess Olympiad (women) in Baku (+6, =4, -1),
- In 2018, at fourth board in the 43rd Chess Olympiad (women) in Batumi (+6, =3, -0).

Nguyễn Thị Mai Hưng played for Vietnam in the World Women's Team Chess Championships:

- In 2011, at third board in the 3rd Women's World Team Chess Championship in Mardin (+2, =3, -1) and won individual bronze medal,
- In 2017, at fourth board in the 5th Women's World Team Chess Championship in Khanty-Mansiysk (+3, =2, -3).

Nguyễn Thị Mai Hưng played for Vietnam in the Women's Asian Team Chess Championships:

- In 2009, at fourth board in the 6th Asian Team Chess Championship (women) in Kolkata (+4, =0, -1) and won team and individual gold medals,
- In 2012, at fourth board in the 5th Asian Team Chess Championship (women) in Zaozhuang (+3, =2, -2) and won team bronze medal,
- In 2014, at first board in the 8th Asian Women's Nations Chess Cup in Tabriz (+0, =2, -2),
- In 2016, at third board in the 9th Asian Women's Nations Chess Cup in Abu Dhabi (+4, =1, -3).

Nguyễn Thị Mai Hưng played for Vietnam in the Asian Games:

- In 2010, at fourth board in the 16th Asian Games (chess - women) in Guangzhou (+4, =1, -2) and won team bronze medal.

In 2010, she was awarded the FIDE Woman International Master (WIM) title and received the FIDE Woman Grandmaster (WGM) title the four years later.
