= Nguyễn Anh Khôi =

Vietnamese chess grandmaster (born 2002)

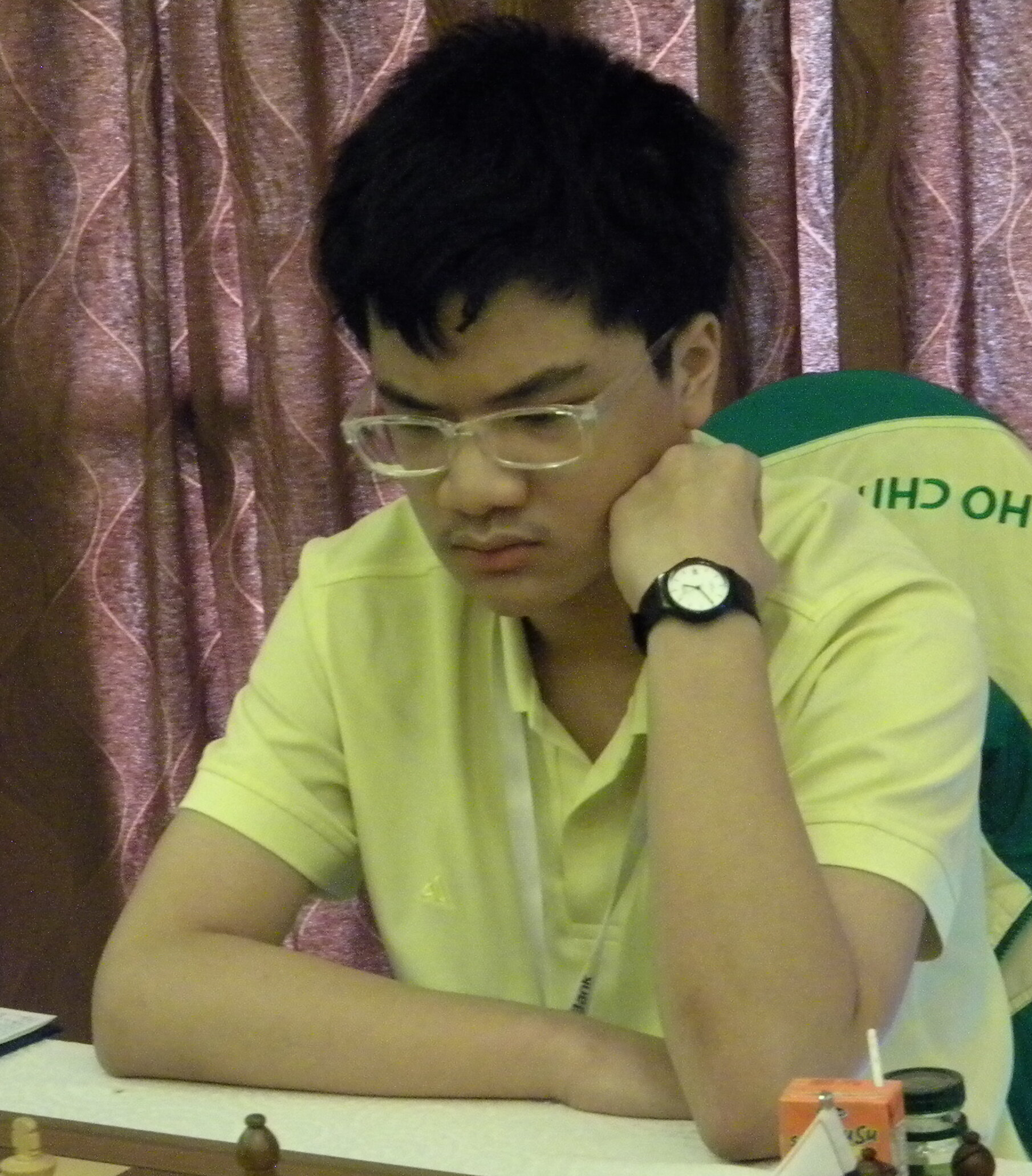
- Nguyễn Anh Khôi in 2016

Personal information
- Born: 11 January 2002 (age 24) Ho Chi Minh City, Vietnam

Chess career
- Country: Vietnam
- Title: Grandmaster (2019)
- FIDE rating: 2520 (July 2026)
- Peak rating: 2529 (August 2019)

Nguyễn Anh Khôi (born 11 January 2002) is a Vietnamese chess Grandmaster (GM) (2019), two-times Vietnamese Chess Championships winner (2016, 2019).

== Biography ==
Nguyễn Anh Khôi won Asian Youth Championship in U10 (2012) and U12 (2014) age groups. Also he won World Youth Chess Championship in U10 (2012) and U12 (2014) age groups. In 2019, Nguyễn Anh Khôi won the Asian Junior Chess Championship.

Nguyễn Anh Khôi twice won Vietnamese Chess Championships in 2016 and 2019.

Nguyễn Anh Khôi played for Vietnam in the Chess Olympiads:

- In 2016, at fourth board in the 42nd Chess Olympiad in Baku (+4, =4, -3),
- In 2018, at fourth board in the 43rd Chess Olympiad in Batumi (+4, =6, -1).

In 2017, he was awarded the FIDE International Master (IM) title and received the FIDE Grandmaster (GM) title two years later.
