= Vietnamese Chess Championship =

Annual chess tournament

The Vietnamese Chess Championship has been held annually since 1980 by the Vietnam Chess Federation (Vietnamese: Liên đoàn Cờ Việt Nam), which joined FIDE in 1988. The federation has also organized an annual Vietnamese Women's Chess Championship since 1983.

== National championship winners ==
| Year | Champion | Women's Champion |
|---|---|---|
| 1980 | Lưu Đức Hải | – |
| 1981 | Đặng Tất Thắng | – |
| 1982 | Đặng Vũ Dũng | – |
| 1983 | Đặng Tất Thắng | Phạm Thị Hòa |
| 1984 | Đặng Tất Thắng | Lê Thị Phương Ngọc |
| 1985 | Đặng Vũ Dũng | Lê Thị Phương Ngọc |
| 1986 | Từ Hoàng Thông | Ngô Huyền Châu |
| 1987 | Từ Hoàng Thông | Phạm Ngọc Thanh |
| 1988 | Hồ Văn Huỳnh | Ngô Huyền Châu |
| 1990 | Hồ Văn Huỳnh | Phạm Ngọc Thanh |
| 1991 | Từ Hoàng Thông | Khương Thị Hồng Nhung |
| 1992 | Đào Thiên Hải | Phan Huỳnh Băng Ngân |
| 1993 | Nguyễn Anh Dũng | Nguyễn Thị Thuận Hóa |
| 1994 | Tô Quốc Khanh | Hoàng Mỹ Thu Giang |
| 1995 | Nguyễn Anh Dũng | Mai Thanh Hương |
| 1996 | Từ Hoàng Thái | Trần Thị Kim Loan |
| 1997 | Nguyễn Anh Dũng | Nguyễn Thị Thuận Hóa |
| 1998 | Từ Hoàng Thông | Lê Kiều Thiên Kim |
| 1999 | Đào Thiên Hải | Lê Thị Phương Liên |
| 2000 | Từ Hoàng Thông | Võ Hồng Phượng |
| 2001 | Đào Thiên Hải | Nguyễn Thị Thanh An |
| 2002 | Đào Thiên Hải | Lê Kiều Thiên Kim |
| 2003 | Bùi Vinh | Nguyễn Thị Thanh An |
| 2004 | Đào Thiên Hải | Hoàng Xuân Thanh Khiết |
| 2005 | Nguyễn Anh Dũng | Nguyễn Thị Thanh An |
| 2006 | Nguyễn Anh Dũng | Lê Kiều Thiên Kim |
| 2007 | Lê Quang Liêm | Lê Kiều Thiên Kim |
| 2008 | Nguyễn Văn Huy | Phạm Lê Thảo Nguyên |
| 2009 | Bùi Vinh | Lê Thanh Tú |
| 2010 | Lê Quang Liêm | Hoàng Thị Bảo Trâm |
| 2011 | Đào Thiên Hải | Nguyễn Thị Mai Hưng |
| 2012 | Nguyễn Đức Hòa | Phạm Lê Thảo Nguyên |
| 2013 | Nguyễn Đức Hòa | Nguyễn Thị Mai Hưng |
| 2014 | Nguyễn Đức Hòa | Hoàng Thị Như Ý |
| 2015 | Nguyễn Văn Huy | Hoàng Thị Bảo Trâm |
| 2016 | Nguyễn Anh Khôi | Hoàng Thị Bảo Trâm |
| 2017 | Trần Tuấn Minh | Hoàng Thị Bảo Trâm |
| 2018 | Trần Tuấn Minh | Hoàng Thị Bảo Trâm |
| 2019 | Nguyễn Anh Khôi | Phạm Lê Thảo Nguyên |
| 2020 | Lê Tuấn Minh | Lương Phương Hạnh |
