= Jamie Dimitroff =

Australian soccer player

Personal information
- Full name: Jamie Thomas Dimitroff
- Date of birth: July 11, 1998 (age 28)
- Place of birth: Los Angeles, California, United States
- Height: 1.75 m (5 ft 9 in)
- Position: Midfielder

Team information
- Current team: MSV Neuruppin
- Number: 17

Youth career
- 2004–2005: TAS FC Cairns
- 2006–2009: Leichhardt FC Cairns
- 2010–2012: FNQ Centre of Excellence
- 2013–2014: QLD Academy of Sport
- 2014–2015: FFA CoE
- 2016: Brisbane Roar

Senior career*
| Years | Team | Apps | (Gls) |
| 2014–2015 | FFA CoE | 27 | (4) |
| 2016–2017 | Seattle Sounders FC 2 | 7 | (0) |
| 2018–2019 | Brisbane City | 6 | (1) |
| 2020–2022 | Eastern Suburbs | 38 | (3) |
| 2022– | MSV Neuruppin | 5 | (0) |

International career^{‡}
| 2013–2014 | Australia U16 | 10 | (3) |
| 2013–2016 | Australia U17 | 14 | (0) |
Medal record
Men's football
Representing Australia
AFF U-16 Youth Championship
| Third place | 2013 Myanmar | U-17 Team |
- * Club domestic league appearances and goals as of 11 November 2022 ‡ National team caps and goals as of 20:33, 11 June 2017 (UTC)

Jamie Thomas Dimitroff (born July 11, 1998) is an Australian soccer player who plays as a midfielder for German club MSV Neuruppin.

== Club career ==
Dimitroff started his career in Cairns, Australia playing club football and representing Cairns with the Cairns Marlins before his selection in the FNQ Centre of Excellence Academy program (U12-U14). During this time he represented Queensland Country at the Australian National Youth Championships and was selected as a 2012 Australian All-Star. In 2012 he was called up to both QAS and AIS training camps. He spent the 2013 season with the Brisbane Roar youth team, playing 8 games and scoring once.

At the end of 2013, Dimitroff was selected for the 2-year residency with the U17 National Team at the Australian Institute of Sport in Canberra. The FFA Centre of Excellence U17 National team (known as the "Joeys") participated in international FIFA tournaments, and also competed in the Australian National Premier League and National Youth League competitions. Dimitroff played 27 games in the National Premier Leagues Capital Football, scoring 4 goals. Dimitroff was named #6 in the 2014 NPL Top 10 Goals of the Year by Capital Football.

He returned to Brisbane Roar for the 2016 season, before moving to the United States, the country of his birth, to join the Seattle Sounders second team. He made his professional debut in a 1–0 away loss to San Antonio FC, replacing Zach Mathers in the 77th minute.

After two seasons spent in the United Soccer League with the Seattle Sounders 2, Dimitroff returned to Australia to sign with NPL Queensland side Brisbane City. On his debut, he contributed both a goal and an assist in a 4–0 victory over North QLD United.

== International career ==
In 2013, Dimitroff was called up to the Australia side for the 2013 AFF U-16 Youth Championship. Dimitroff assisted a goal against Malaysia in the 2014 AFC U-16 Championship in Bangkok, which qualified Australia for the U17 World Cup in Chile. Including FIFA tournaments and international friendlies, Dimitroff played 24 games for the U16 and U17 national teams as an attacking midfielder, scoring 3 goals and 4 assists.

== Career statistics ==
=== Club ===
As of 7 June 2018.

| Club | Season | League | | | Cup | | Continental | | Other | | Total | |
| Club | Season | Division | Apps | Goals | Apps | Goals | Apps | Goals | Apps | Goals | Apps | Goals |
|---|---|---|---|---|---|---|---|---|---|---|---|---|
| FFA CoE | 2014 | NPL Capital Football | 14 | 2 | 0 | 0 | – | | 0 | 0 | 14 | 2 |
| FFA CoE | 2015 | NPL Capital Football | 13 | 2 | 0 | 0 | – | | 0 | 0 | 13 | 2 |
| FFA CoE | Total | | 27 | 4 | 0 | 0 | – | | 0 | 0 | 27 | 4 |
| Seattle Sounders FC 2 | 2016 | United Soccer League | 2 | 0 | 0 | 0 | – | | 0 | 0 | 2 | 0 |
| Seattle Sounders FC 2 | 2017 | United Soccer League | 5 | 0 | 0 | 0 | – | | 0 | 0 | 5 | 0 |
| Seattle Sounders FC 2 | Total | | 7 | 0 | 0 | 0 | – | | 0 | 0 | 7 | 0 |
| Brisbane City | 2018 | NPL Queensland | 6 | 1 | 0 | 0 | – | | 0 | 0 | 6 | 1 |
| Career total | | | 40 | 5 | 0 | 0 | – | | 0 | 0 | 40 | 5 |
