= Reksa Maulana =

Indonesian footballer

Personal information
- Full name: Reksa Maulana
- Date of birth: 20 March 1998 (age 28)
- Place of birth: Jakarta, Indonesia
- Height: 1.71 m (5 ft 7 in)
- Position: Defensive midfielder

Team information
- Current team: Persikota Tangerang
- Number: 8

Youth career
- Villa 2000

Senior career*
Years	Team	Apps	(Gls)
2017	Persikad Depok	3	(0)
2018–2021	Bhayangkara	7	(0)
2020	→ Persik Kediri (loan)	1	(0)
2021–2023	Dewa United	7	(0)
2023–2024	PSKC Cimahi	11	(2)
2024–	Persikota Tangerang	30	(0)

International career
2013	Indonesia U16	12	(1)
Medal record
Men's football
Representing Indonesia
AFF U-16 Youth Championship
Runner-up	2013 Myanmar
- * Club domestic league appearances and goals as of 13 November 2026

Reksa Maulana (born 20 March 1998) is an Indonesian professional footballer who plays as a defensive midfielder for Liga Nusantara club Persikota Tangerang.

== Honours ==
=== Club ===
Dewa United

- Liga 2 third place (play-offs): 2021

=== International ===
Indonesia U16

- AFF U-16 Youth Championship runner-up: 2013
