= Danny Kim =

Australian soccer player

Personal information
- Full name: Danny Kim
- Date of birth: 28 May 1998 (age 28)
- Place of birth: Australia
- Height: 1.78 m (5 ft 10 in)
- Position: Defensive midfielder

Team information
- Current team: Green Gully
- Number: 8

Senior career*
Years	Team	Apps	(Gls)
2014–2015	FFA CoE	11	(0)
2016–2017	Brisbane Roar NPL	12	(0)
2017–2018	Hume City		
2019–2020	Lions FC	44	(3)
2020	→ Brisbane Roar (loan)	5	(0)
2020–2021	Brisbane Roar	3	(0)
2021	Brisbane Roar NPL	6	(0)
2021	Geylang International	10	(1)
2022	Bentleigh Greens	26	(0)
2023	South Melbourne	5	(0)
2023	Green Gully	8	(0)
2024–	Dandenong City	2	(0)

International career^{‡}
2013–2015	Australia U-17	8	(1)
Medal record
Men's football
Representing Australia
AFF U-16 Youth Championship
Third place	2013 Myanmar	U-17 Team
- * Club domestic league appearances and goals as of 20 February 2024 ‡ National team caps and goals as of 20 July 2020

- Danny Kim
- Hangul: 김형준
- RR: Gim Hyeongjun
- MR: Kim Hyŏngjun

Danny Hyungjun Kim (born 28 May 1998) is an Australian professional soccer player who plays as a defensive midfielder for Dandenong City.

== Early life ==
Kim is the son of South Korean international defender Kim Pan-keun.

== Playing career ==
=== Club ===
Kim signed a short-term loan deal for Brisbane Roar from Lions FC for the Roar's final games of the 2019–20 A-League season, following delays caused by the coronavirus pandemic in Australia. Kim previously played for Brisbane Roar FC Youth prior to signing for Hume City in 2017. Kim returned to Lions FC at the end of the A-League season.

=== Geylang International ===
On 16 July 2021, Danny Kim embarks his move to Southeast Asia by signing for the Singapore Premier League side, Geylang International FC. The 23-year-old midfielder will join Geylang International FC's vacant slot of the foreign players for the 2021 season. On 25 August 2021, Kim scored his 1st goal for Geylang International FC, scoring with a powerful shot from just outside the penalty box against Tampines Rovers. On 11 November 2021, he leaves Geylang International FC.

=== International ===
Kim has represented the Australian under-17 national side, and scored a long-range goal for the team in a win over Macau in 2014 AFC U-16 Championship qualification.

== Career statistics ==
=== Club ===
As of 10 Oct 2021.

Club	Season	League			FA Cup		League Cup		AFC Cup		Total	
Club	Season	Division	Apps	Goals	Apps	Goals	Apps	Goals	Apps	Goals	Apps	Goals
Queensland Lions FC	2019	National Premier Leagues Queensland	29	1	0	0	0	0	0	0	29	1
Queensland Lions FC	2020	National Premier Leagues Queensland	15	2	0	0	0	0	0	0	15	2
Queensland Lions FC	Total		44	3	0	0	0	0	0	0	44	3
Brisbane Roar FC	2019–20	A-League	5	0	0	0	0	0	0	0	5	0
Brisbane Roar FC	2020–21	A-League	3	0	0	0	0	0	0	0	3	0
Brisbane Roar FC	Total		8	0	0	0	0	0	0	0	8	0
Brisbane Roar FC Youth	2021	National Premier Leagues Queensland	6	0	0	0	0	0	0	0	6	0
Brisbane Roar FC Youth	Total		6	0	0	0	0	0	0	0	6	0
Geylang International	2021	Singapore Premier League	10	1	0	0	0	0	0	0	10	1
Geylang International	Total		10	1	0	0	0	0	0	0	10	1
Career total			68	4	0	0	0	0	0	0	68	4
