= Jamal Reiners =

South African-born Australian soccer player

Personal information
- Full name: Jamal Reiners
- Date of birth: 19 May 1998 (age 28)
- Place of birth: South Africa
- Position: Striker

Youth career
- Mandurah City
- FW NTC
- 2015–2017: Perth Glory

Senior career*
Years	Team	Apps	(Gls)
2014–2015	FFA CoE	18	(9)
2015–2017	Perth Glory	17	(0)
2016–2017	Perth Glory NPL	6	(0)
2019	Floreat Athena	5	(0)
2019	ECU Joondalup	4	(1)

International career^{‡}
2013–2014	Australia U-17	10	(4)
Medal record
Men's football
Representing Australia
AFF U-16 Youth Championship
Third place	2013 Myanmar	U-17 Team
- * Club domestic league appearances and goals as of 15 September 2019 ‡ National team caps and goals as of 16 November 2015

Jamal Damain Reiners (born 19 May 1998) is an Australian professional footballer who played as a striker for Perth Glory.

== Playing career ==
He came through Western Australia's National Training Centre and he has featured in Australian under 16 and under 17 tours and tournaments in Italy and Hong Kong. In 2014, he was one of 24 scholars accepted at Football Federation of Australia's (FFA) Centre of Excellence at the Australian Institute of Sport (AIS).

=== Perth Glory ===
Reiners signed with Perth Glory on 25 October 2015 at the age of 17. Reiners earned his starting debut for Perth Glory on 16 December 2015 against defending champions, Melbourne Victory. He set up Diego Castro for the winner in the 74th minute of that game.
