= Ngọc Lặc =

Ngọc Lặc Xã Ngọc Lặc
- Commune
- Ngọc Lặc commune
- Location within Vietnam
- Coordinates: 20°05′26″N 105°22′26″E
- Country: Vietnam
- Region: North Central Coast
- Province: Thanh Hóa
- Time zone: UTC+7 (UTC + 7)

Ngọc Lặc is a commune (xã) of Thanh Hóa Province, Vietnam.
