= Ngọc Lặc district =

Coordinates: 20.083°N 105.383°E

Ngọc Lặc district Huyện Ngọc Lặc
- District
- Interactive map of Ngọc Lặc district
- Country: Vietnam
- Region: North Central Coast
- Province: Thanh Hóa province
- Capital: Ngọc Lặc

Area
  - Total: 195 sq mi (504 km^{2})

Population (2018)
  - Total: 136,210
- Time zone: UTC+7 (UTC + 7)

Ngọc Lặc is a district (huyện) of Thanh Hóa province in the North Central Coast region of Vietnam.

As of 2003 the district had a population of 132,191. The district covers an area of 504 km^{2} (195 sq mi). The district capital lies at Ngọc Lặc.
