= Jenna McCormick =

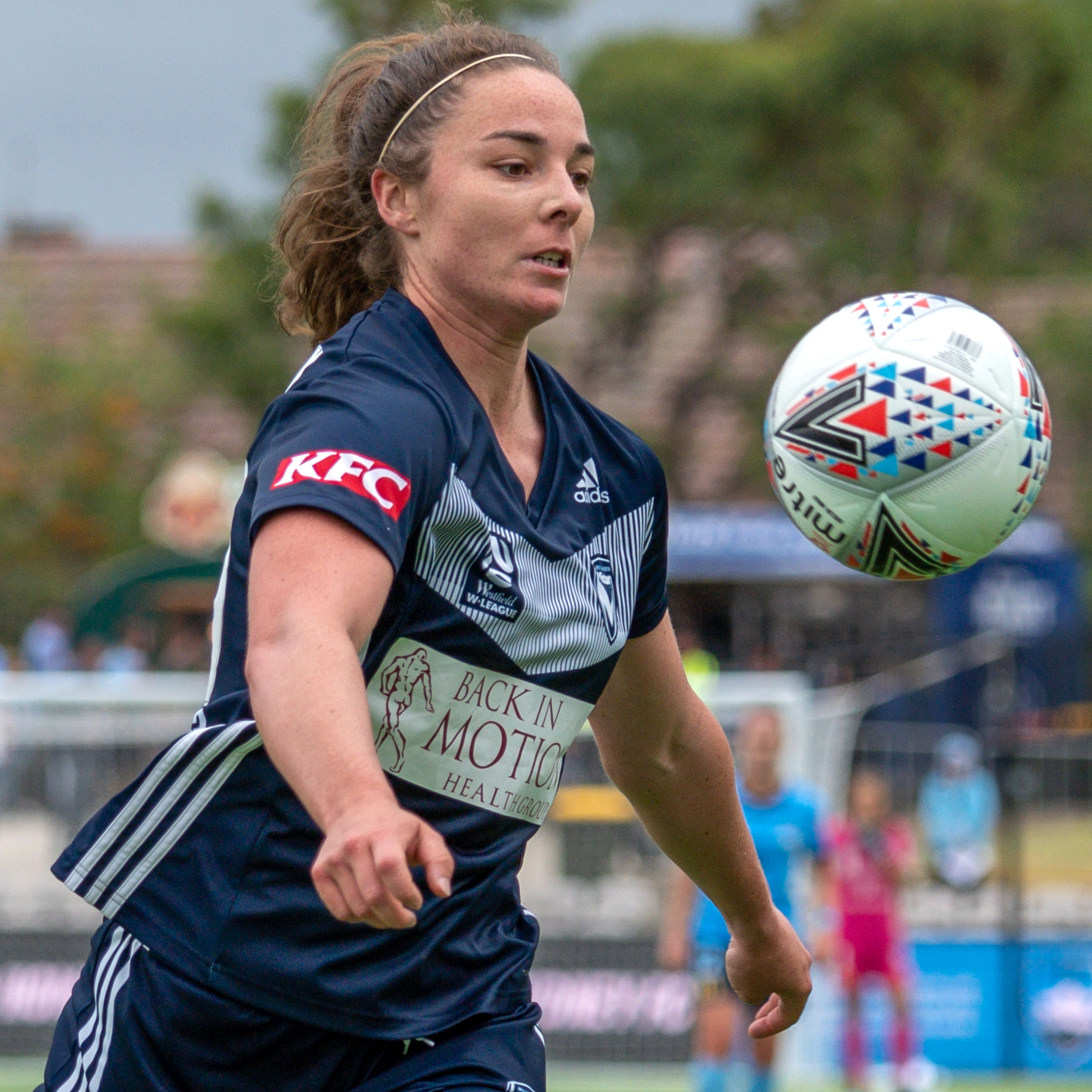
- McCormick playing W-League for Melbourne Victory in November 2019
- Born: 7 September 1994 (age 32); Mount Gambier, South Australia, Australia
Association football career
- Height: 1.71 m (5 ft 7 1/2 in)
- Positions: Centre-back; attacking midfielder
Youth career
- Blue Lake SC
Senior career*
Years	Team	Apps	(Gls)
2012–2015	Adelaide United	26	(0)
2015–2017	Canberra United	24	(3)
2016	Stjarnan	20	(1)
2017	Medkila	9	(1)
2017–2018	Adelaide United	12	(1)
2018–2019	Brisbane Roar	12	(0)
2019–2020	Melbourne Victory	12	(0)
2020	Real Betis	1	(0)
2020–2021	Melbourne City	10	(1)
2021–2022	AGF	20	(2)
2022–2023	Adelaide United	15	(0)
2023–2024	Brisbane Roar	22	(3)
Total		183	(12)
International career^{‡}
2019–	Australia	4	(0)
- * Club domestic league appearances and goals as of 22 August 2023 ‡ National team caps and goals as of 11 March 2020
Australian rules football career
Personal information
- Draft: No. 23, 2016 AFL Women's draft
- Height: 171 cm (5 ft 7 in)
- Position: Midfield/Forward
Playing career^{1}
Years	Club	Games (Goals)
2017–2019	Adelaide	20 (9)
- ^{1} Playing statistics correct to the end of the 2019 season.
Career highlights
- 2× AFL Women's premiership player: 2017, 2019

Jenna McCormick (born 7 September 1994) is a professional Australian sportswoman who last played soccer for Australian A-League Women's club Brisbane Roar and has played Australian rules football for the Adelaide Football Club in the AFL Women's (AFLW) competition.

== Early life ==
McCormick was born and raised in Mount Gambier, South Australia, before moving to Adelaide in 2011. She played junior soccer for Blue Lake SC in Mount Gambier. In Mount Gambier, Jenna attended Tenison Woods College and in Adelaide, McCormick attended Walford Anglican School for Girls and played soccer, cricket and Australian rules football at high levels.

== Soccer career ==
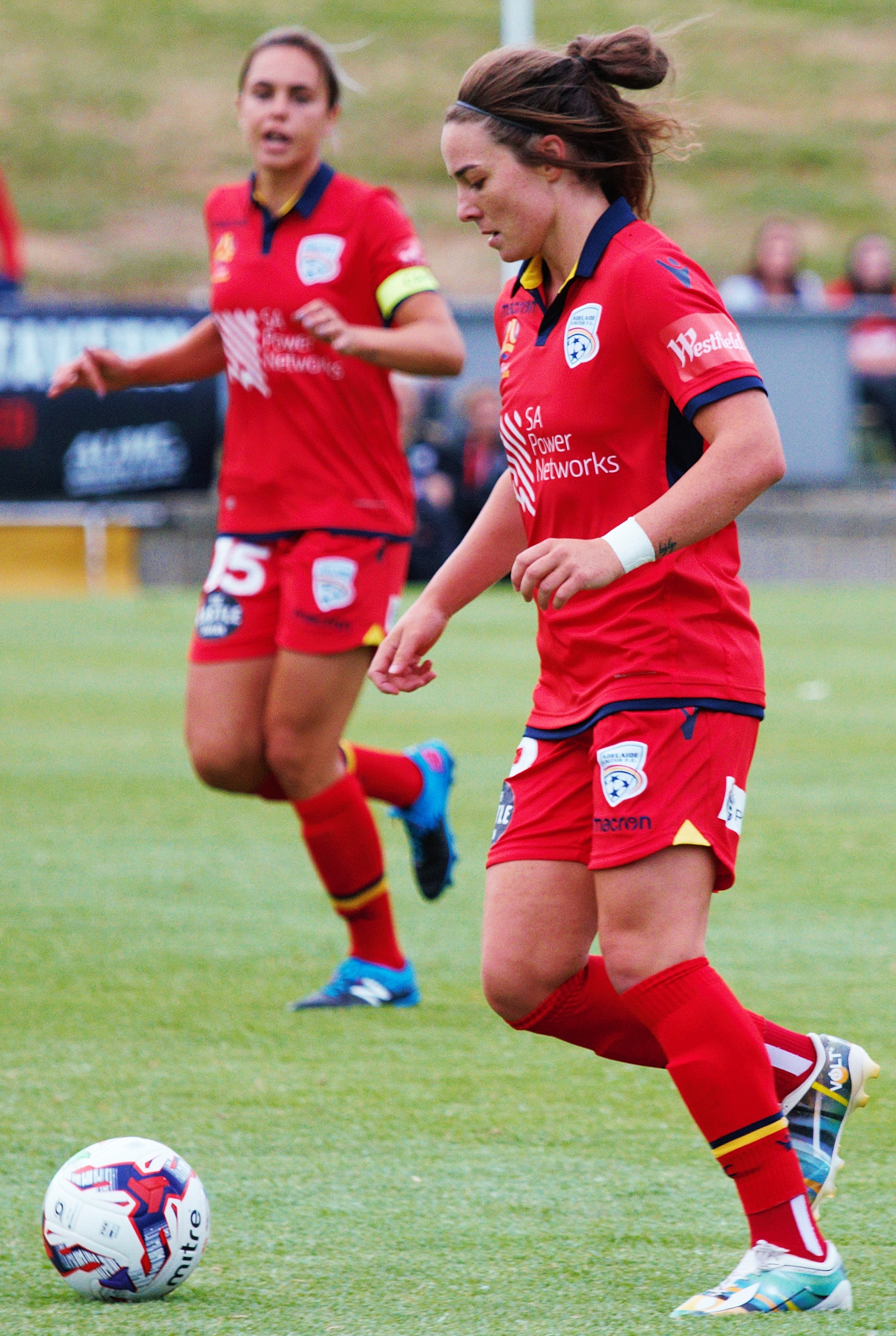
McCormick playing soccer for Adelaide United in 2017

McCormick made her debut in the W-League for Adelaide United in December 2012 in a loss to Melbourne Victory. She usually plays as a midfielder, but was used as a defender by Adelaide in the 2013–14 W-League. McCormick was included in an Australian Schoolgirls team to tour South America in 2013, and was named player of the tournament.

McCormick joined Canberra United Football Club in 2015. In 2016, she moved to Iceland to play for Stjarnan in the Úrvalsdeild; making her debut as a substitute in a win over Selfoss. Jenna returned to Canberra United for the 2016–17 season.

In July 2017, McCormick signed to play the second half of the 2017 season with Medkila IL in the Toppserien, the top tier of women's soccer in Norway.

In September 2017, McCormick committed to returning to Adelaide United for the 2017–18 W-League season.

In October 2018, McCormick signed to play for Brisbane Roar for the 2018–19 W-League season.

In October 2019, McCormick quit AFLW and joined Melbourne Victory FC on a one-year deal. In November 2019, McCormick made her debut for the National team – the Matildas. She was in the starting XI in a Friendly against Chile. The Matildas won the match 2–1.

In July 2020, McCormick inked a deal with Spanish club Real Betis based in Seville on a two-year deal. Only five months later, it was announced that Real Betis and McCormick mutually agreed to terminate her contract, having played only one game.

A week after being released by Real Betis, McCormick signed with Melbourne City.

In August 2021, McCormick joined Danish club AGF Fodbold. Playing 25 games overall, 20 in the Danish Women's League and 5 in the Danish Women's Cup.

September 2022 saw McCormick rejoin Adelaide United for the 2022–23 A-League Women season. This club is where her professional career began.

In August 2023, McCormick returned to Brisbane Roar. At the end of the season, in September 2024, the club updated that McCormick had departed.

== Australian rules career ==
In April 2016, McCormick declared her interest in playing in the newly formed AFL Women's competition, the first professional women's Australian rules football league. She was drafted by Adelaide in the 2016 AFL Women's draft. McCormick missed round 1 of the 2017 season to play for Canberra United in the W-League semi-final on 5 February 2017. She debuted in round 2 of the 2017 season against the Western Bulldogs, and played seven games including the grand final in the Adelaide team that won the inaugural AFLW Premiership in 2017.

Adelaide signed McCormick for the 2018 season during the trade period in May 2017, and she again missed the opening round of the season due to W-League commitments, joining the team for their round 2 match against Melbourne. She signed with the Crows for the 2019 season in May 2018.

=== AFL Women's statistics ===
Statistics are correct to the end of the 2019 season

Legend
G	Goals	K	Kicks	D	Disposals	T	Tackles
B	Behinds	H	Handballs	M	Marks

Season	Team	No.	Games	Totals							Averages (per game)						
Season	Team	No.	Games	G	B	K	H	D	M	T	G	B	K	H	D	M	T
2017^{#}	Adelaide	5	7	4	2	29	14	43	6	13	0.6	0.3	4.1	2.0	6.1	0.9	1.9
2018	Adelaide	5	6	5	7	31	6	37	10	15	0.8	1.2	5.2	1.0	6.2	1.7	2.5
2019^{#}	Adelaide	5	7	0	1	48	16	64	13	13	0.0	0.1	6.9	2.3	9.1	1.9	1.9
Career			20	9	10	108	36	144	29	41	0.5	0.5	5.4	1.8	7.7	1.5	2.1

== Honours ==
=== Soccer ===
==== Club ====
Stjarnan

- Úrvalsdeild: 2016

Canberra United

- W-League Premiership: 2016–17

==== Individual ====
- Adelaide United Player of the Year: 2013–14

=== Australian rules football ===
==== Club ====
Adelaide

- AFL Women's: 2017, 2019
- Key to the City of Adelaide: 28 April 2017 to the Inaugural Premiership Team

== See also ==
- List of players who have converted from one football code to another
