= Alexandra Gummer =

Australian soccer player

Personal information
- Full name: Alexandra Gummer
- Date of birth: 10 September 1992 (age 34)
- Place of birth: Australia
- Height: 1.65 m (5 ft 5 in)
- Positions: Left back; centre back

Team information
- Current team: BSC Young Boys
- Number: 3

Youth career
- 1997–2005: Drouin Dragons
- 2005–2013: Casey Comets

Senior career*
Years	Team	Apps	(Gls)
2013–2014	Adelaide United	7	(2)
2014–2015	Melbourne Victory	0	(0)
2015–2016	Adelaide United	11	(1)
2016	Doncaster Rovers Belles	1	(0)
2016–2020	Melbourne Victory	14	(0)
2020–	BSC Young Boys	1	(0)
- * Club domestic league appearances and goals as of 20 February 2018

Alexandra Gummer (born 10 September 1992) is an Australian former soccer player who last played for BSC Young Boys in the Swiss Nationalliga A. She previously played in the Australian W-League for Melbourne Victory and Adelaide United and in the English FA WSL for Doncaster Rovers Belles. Gummer has also been involved with WNPL Victoria side South Melbourne FC during the W-League off-season since 2017.
