= Nguyễn Văn Huy =

Vietnamese chess grandmaster (born 1985)

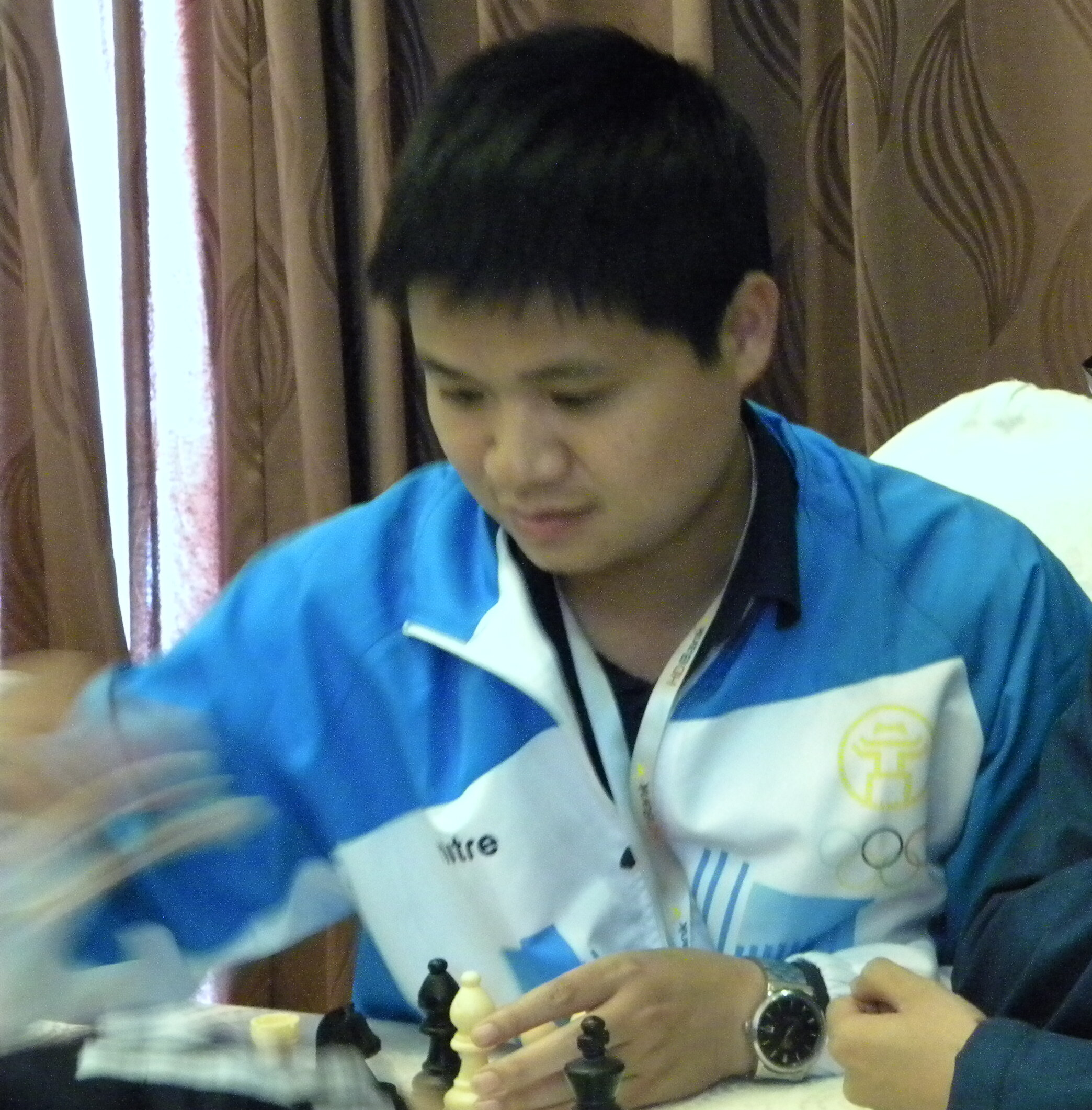
- Nguyễn Văn Huy in 2016

Personal information
- Born: 14 March 1985 (age 41) Bắc Ninh, Vietnam

Chess career
- Country: Vietnam
- Title: Grandmaster (2020)
- Peak rating: 2517 (October 2012)

Nguyễn Văn Huy (born 14 March 1985) is a Vietnamese chess Grandmaster (GM) (2019), two-times Vietnamese Chess Championships winner (2008, 2015), Asian Team Chess Championship team bronze medal winner (2012).

== Biography ==
Nguyễn Văn Huy twice won Vietnamese Chess Championships in 2008 and 2015. In 2012, he won silver medal in Asian Individual Blitz Chess Championship 2012 (behind winner Wesley So).

Nguyễn Văn Huy played for Vietnam in the Chess Olympiad:

- In 2004, at second reserve board in the 36th Chess Olympiad in Calvià (+3, =2, -4),
- In 2008, at fourth board in the 38th Chess Olympiad in Dresden (+2, =2, -2),
- In 2012, at third board in the 40th Chess Olympiad in Istanbul (+3, =6, -0),
- In 2014, at fourth board in the 41st Chess Olympiad in Tromsø (+2, =2, -2).

Nguyễn Văn Huy played for Vietnam in the Men's Asian Team Chess Championship:

- In 2012, at fourth board in the 17th Asian Team Chess Championship in Zaozhuang (+2, =2, -2) and won team bronze medal.

In 2009, he was awarded the FIDE International Master (IM) title and received the FIDE Grandmaster (GM) title ten years later.
