= Lisa-Marie Woods =

Norwegian footballer (born 1984)

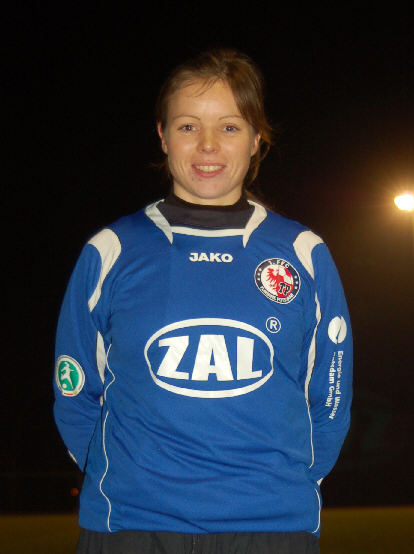

Personal information
- Full name: Lisa-Marie Woods
- Date of birth: 23 May 1984 (age 42)
- Place of birth: Tønsberg, Norway
- Height: 1.56 m (5 ft 1 in)
- Position: Midfielder

Team information
- Current team: Asheville City SC

Youth career
- Lindeberg
- Trosterud
- Vålerenga

College career
Years	Team	Apps	(Gls)
2003	Oakland Golden Grizzlies		
2004	Middle Tennessee Blue Raiders		

Senior career*
Years	Team	Apps	(Gls)
2000–2008	Asker SK		
2008	Stabæk		
2009	1. FFC Turbine Potsdam		
2009	FC Indiana		
2009	Kolbotn IL	4	(1)
2010	Stabæk	22	(13)
2011	Fortuna Hjørring	4	(1)
2011	Perth Glory	1	(0)
2012	Ottawa Fury		
2012	Fortuna Hjørring	2	(0)
2013	Boston Breakers	4	(0)
2013	LSK Kvinner	7	(1)
2013–2015	Adelaide United	23	(3)
2014	→ Ottawa Fury (loan)		
2015	BIIK Kazygurt		
2017	Avaldsnes IL	9	(0)
2018	Asheville City SC	5	(1)

International career^{‡}
2000	Norway U17	6	(2)
2001	Norway U18	7	(4)
2002–2003	Norway U19	19	(5)
2003–2006	Norway U21	15	(1)
2007	Norway U23	7	(1)
2009–2011	Norway	23	(6)

Managerial career
- 2018–: Creighton University (assistant)
- * Club domestic league appearances and goals as of 10 October 2015 ‡ National team caps and goals as of 29 February 2012

Lisa-Marie Woods (born 23 May 1984) is a Norwegian retired professional football midfielder and current assistant coach at Creighton University. She last played at Asheville City SC of the Women's Premier Soccer League as a forward. She has previously played for Asker SK and LSK Kvinner in the Toppserien FC Indiana & Ottawa Fury in North America's USL W-League as well as Kolbotn, Stabæk, and Fortuna Hjørring in Denmark's Elitedivisionen, BIIK Kazygurt in the Kazakhstani women's football championship, and Perth Glory in Australia's W-League.

== Early life ==
=== University ===
Woods played for Oakland University in Rochester, Michigan during her freshman year in 2003. She later transferred to Middle Tennessee State University, where she played in 2004. These periods were alternated with summer seasons in Norway with Asker FK in Toppserien. In 2008, she played for Ottawa Fury during the summer break for the Beijing Olympics.

== Playing career ==
=== Club ===
Woods began her career at Trosterud and later joined Lindeberg; she then transferred to Vålerenga, and in July 2001 joined Asker SK on loan. She scored in her first match on 21 July 2001 when Asker beat Røa 8–0. Asker was a successful Toppserien team that in 2005 won the Norwegian Cup. She also played on the losing side of the Cup Final in 2006 and 2007 with Asker.

On 23 January 2009 Woods joined the German club 1. FFC Turbine Potsdam, signing a contract up to 30 June 2010. Woods stayed for 2 months at the club and then joined the American club FC Indiana as a forward. After a successful American season with many goals scored, she transferred back to Norway and the elite Toppserien club Kolbotn in August 2009.

In January 2010 Woods signed to play for Stabæk, Oslo. 2010 was a successful year for Woods, playing as a defensive midfielder for Stabæk. She finished the season with 13 goals, while Stabæk finished top of the Toppserien league. On 14 November she was awarded the Toppserien Player of the Year prize.

In January 2011 Woods left Norway to sign for the Danish club Fortuna Hjørring. After a successful season in Denmark in the 3F league, ending in November 2011, Woods signed to start playing immediately with Perth Glory in the Westfield-W league in Australia. After her stay at Glory, Woods returned to play in the regular season for Fortuna Hjørring again. Upcoming summer break in the Danish League, Woods was offered to play with Ottawa Fury with Fellow Norwegian International Leni Kaurin. Ottawa Fury won the W-league and Woods was voted Ottawa Fury MVP. Upon completion of W-league season, she once again returned to the Danish League to play for her club Fortuna Hjørring.

15 November she returns to the W-League, after signing with the Lady Reds, where she re-unites with Kristy Moore and Melissa Barbieri whom she played with at Fortuna.

In 2015, she played for Kazakh champions BIIK Kazygurt.

In 2017 she was back in Norway with Avaldsnes IL, playing 9 league games. She joined Asheville City SC in 2018.

=== International ===
In 2003 Woods captained Norway in the UEFA Women's Under-19 Championship. Her team reached the Final in Leipzig, Germany, where they lost 0–2 to France. In October 2009 Woods was selected for the Norway women's national football team to play in qualification matches for a forthcoming championship. She played as a substitute against the Netherlands in a match that Norway won 3–0.

In 2010 Norway played 16 international matches to mid–November, including important qualification matches for the 2011 World Cup. Woods played in 13 of the matches, mainly as a defensive midfielder in a 4–4–2 formation, and scored five goals. She was withdrawn from the 2011 FIFA Women's World Cup squad with a hip injury. She recovered quickly from the injury as she returned to play for her club Fortuna Hjørring that same summer. Woods was called up to the national team again for the next Euro qualifications in Iceland where she earned her spot in the starting lineup again.

== International goals ==
No.	Date	Venue	Opponent	Score	Result	Competition
1.	1 March 2010	Francisco Vieira Stadium, Silves, Portugal	Iceland	3–1	3–2	2010 Algarve Cup
2.	27 March 2010	AKA Arena, Hønefoss, Norway	Macedonia	11–0	14–0	2011 FIFA Women's World Cup qualification
3.	27 March 2010	AKA Arena, Hønefoss, Norway	Macedonia	14–0	14–0	2011 FIFA Women's World Cup qualification
4.	23 June 2010	Skagerak Arena, Skien, Norway	Belarus	2–0	3–0	2011 FIFA Women's World Cup qualification
5.	21 August 2010	NTC Stadion, Senec, Slovakia	Slovakia	3–0	4–0	2011 FIFA Women's World Cup qualification
6.	25 August 2010	Goce Delčev Stadium, Prilep, Macedonia	Macedonia	2–0	7–0	2011 FIFA Women's World Cup qualification

== Coaching career ==
In 2018, Woods joined the women's soccer coaching staff at Creighton University.

== Personal ==
Woods is of Scottish, Norwegian descent; the daughter of Gregory James and Gunn-Karin. Her brother Scott is also a footballer and played for the Philippines.

== Honours ==
- 2005: Winner Norwegian Cup with Asker FK
- All-‐American 2004/2004
- Mid-‐Con Newcomer of the Year
- Great Lakes First-‐team
- All-‐Mid-‐Con
- Great Lakes Freshman of the Year
- Team All-‐Great Lakes
- Mid-‐Con Offensive Player of the Week(Oct.20)
- MVP Asker Fotball Kvinner 2008
- Player of the year 2010
- Toppserien "Kniksen Prisen"
