= Monique Iannella =

Australian soccer player

Personal information
- Full name: Monique Iannella
- Date of birth: 1 August 1996 (age 30)
- Place of birth: Mount Gambier, South Australia, Australia
- Height: 1.73 m (5 ft 8 in)
- Positions: Defender; midfielder

Youth career
- 2004–2006: Gambier Centrals
- 2006: Mount Gambier IAC
- 2009–2010: SASI

College career
Years	Team	Apps	(Gls)
2016–2017	Texas Longhorns	13	(0)
2017–2019	Hofstra Pride	48	(1)

Senior career*
Years	Team	Apps	(Gls)
2011	Cumberland United	9	(0)
2012–2013	Adelaide City	29	(24)
2013–2014	Adelaide United	15	(0)
2015–2016	Melbourne City	0	(0)

International career
2014–2015	Australia U19		
2015–	Australia U20		
- * Club domestic league appearances and goals as of 24 September 2017

Monique Iannella (born 1 August 1996) is an Australian football (soccer) player, who played in the Australian W-League for Adelaide United and Melbourne City and in the American college system for the Texas Longhorns and for the Hofstra Pride.

== Club career ==
=== Adelaide United, 2013–2015 ===
Iannella made her debut in the Australian W-League for Adelaide United during the 2013/14 season. She made 8 appearances for the club primarily playing in the midfielder position. Adelaide finished the regular season in 6th place with a 3–5–4 record. Iannella returned to Adelaide for the 2014/2015 season and started in all 7 matches in which she appeared. The team finished in seventh place during the regular season with a 3–8–1 record.

=== Melbourne City, 2015–2016 ===
In September 2015, it was announced Iannella had signed with Melbourne City for the 2015/2016 season playing primarily in a defender position.

=== Texas Longhorns ===
In June 2016, Iannella moved to Texas to study at the University of Texas at Austin and joined their soccer team, the Texas Longhorns.

=== Hofstra Pride ===
In 2017, Iannella transferred to Hofstra Pride where she plays alongside countrywoman Emily Hulbert.

== International career ==
Ianella represented Australia at the 2015 AFF Women's Championship in Vietnam after helping the team qualify in November 2014.

== See also ==
- Women's association football in Australia
