= Tiarn Powell =

Australian soccer player (born 1991)

Personal information
- Date of birth: 4 February 1991 (age 35)
- Height: 1.72 m (5 ft 8 in)
- Position: Forward

Team information
- Current team: Adelaide United

Tiarn Powell (born 4 February 1991) is an Australian football player who played as a striker for Adelaide United in the Australian W-League.
