= Phạm Trọng Hoá =

Vietnamese footballer

Personal information
- Full name: Phạm Trọng Hóa
- Date of birth: June 23, 1998 (age 28)
- Place of birth: Thường Xuân, Thanh Hóa, Vietnam
- Height: 1.71 m (5 ft 7 in)
- Position: Midfielder

Team information
- Current team: Long An
- Number: 36

Youth career
- 2010–2015: PVF Football Academy

Senior career*
Years	Team	Apps	(Gls)
2016–2022	SHB Đà Nẵng	20	(0)
2021	→ Phố Hiến (loan)	3	(0)
2022	Cần Thơ	5	(0)
2023–2024	Long An	29	(1)
2024–2025	Phù Đổng Ninh Bình	0	(0)
2025–	Long An	0	(0)

International career
2015–2018	Vietnam U19	6	(2)
- * Club domestic league appearances and goals as of 14 June 2025

Phạm Trọng Hoá (born 23 June 1998) is a Vietnamese professional footballer who plays as a midfielder for V.League 2 club Long An.

== Honours ==
Phù Đổng Ninh Bình

- V.League 2: 2024–25
