= Tegan Riding =

Australian soccer player

Personal information
- Full name: Tegan Riding
- Date of birth: 9 November 1993 (age 33)
- Place of birth: Australia
- Height: 1.70 m (5 ft 7 in)
- Position: Attacking midfielder

Senior career*
Years	Team	Apps	(Gls)
2013	Redlands United	20	(29)
2013–2014	Adelaide United	5	(0)
2014–2016	Canberra United	11	(0)
- * Club domestic league appearances and goals as of 6 March 2016

Tegan Riding (born 9 November 1993) is an Australian football (soccer) player, who played for Adelaide United and Canberra United in the Australian W-League. Riding has been praised for her athletic ability and work ethic.
