= Lê Tiến Anh =

Vietnamese footballer (born 1998)

Personal information
- Full name: Lê Mạnh Dũng
- Date of birth: 23 March 1998 (age 28)
- Place of birth: Thạch Thành, Thanh Hóa, Vietnam
- Height: 1.68 m (5 ft 6 in)
- Position: Midfielder

Team information
- Current team: Bắc Ninh
- Number: 11

Youth career
- 2009–2018: Viettel

Senior career*
Years	Team	Apps	(Gls)
2015–2018	Viettel B		
2019–2020	Bình Phước	9	(0)
2021–2022	Topenland Bình Định	18	(0)
2023	Khánh Hòa	12	(0)
2023–2025	Hải Phòng	5	(0)
2025–2026	Hồ Chí Minh City	19	(0)
2026–	Bắc Ninh	0	(0)

International career
2013	Vietnam U16	9	(2)
- * Club domestic league appearances and goals as of 7 June 2026

Lê Tiến Anh (born 23 March 1998) is a Vietnamese professional footballer who plays as a midfielder for V.League 1 club Bắc Ninh.

== Club career ==
Born in Thanh Hóa, Tiến Anh was formed at the Viettel youth academy. He captained Viettel B at the 2017 Second Division, before suffering from a knee injury that ruled him out for almost 2 years. During his injury, he was released by Viettel in 2018, and worked temporarily as a football tutor and sells football boots in Hanoi.

In 2019, Tiến Anh joined V.League 2 club Bình Phước and played there during two seasons.

In 2021, Tiến Anh moved to V.League 1 club Topenland Bình Định. There, he had a great start at the 2021 season, being one of the best midfielders in the league, before the league was cancelled due to the outbreak of Covid-19 pandemic in Vietnam.

Tiến Anh joined Khánh Hòa in the 2023 season but left after one season due to wage problems. He signed for Hải Phòng in September 2023.

In September 2025, Tiến Anh moved to Hồ Chí Minh City in the V.League 2. On 9 August 2026, he was transferred to newly promoted V.League 1 side Bắc Ninh.

== International career ==
In July 2021, Tiến Anh was called up to the Vietnam national team to prepare for the AFC's third round of the 2022 FIFA World Cup qualification.
