= Jessica Waterhouse =

Australian soccer and Australian rules football player

Personal information
- Full name: Jessica Lee Waterhouse
- Date of birth: 7 February 1997 (age 29)
- Place of birth: Australia
- Position: Defensive midfielder

Youth career
- SASI
- FFSA NTC

Senior career*
| Years | Team | Apps | (Gls) |
| 2012–2014 | Adelaide United | 14 | (0) |

International career^{‡}
- Australia U-17
- * Club domestic league appearances and goals as of 28 February 2014 ‡ National team caps and goals as of 28 February 2014

Jessica Waterhouse

Personal information
- Original team: Happy Valley / Christies Beach (Adelaide Footy League)
- Draft: 2022 free agency
- Debut: Round 5, 2022 ^{(S7)}, Adelaide vs. Greater Western Sydney, at Unley Oval
- Height: 157 cm (5 ft 2 in)
- Position: Forward

Playing career^{1}
| Years | Club | Games (Goals) |
| 2022 ^{(S7)}–2024 | Adelaide | 15 (5) |
| Total | | 15 (5) |
- ^{1} Playing statistics correct to the end of 2024.

Jessica Lee Waterhouse (born 7 February 1997) is a former Australian rules footballer and former professional soccer player who last played for the Adelaide Crows in the AFL Women's. As a soccer player, they (Note: Waterhouse uses both she/her and they/them pronouns. This article uses they/them pronouns for consistency.) played for Adelaide United in the Australian W-League. They played there for three seasons.

== AFL Women's career ==
In 2017, Waterhouse shifted to Australian rules football, signing with the Christies Beach Football Club in the Adelaide Footy League competition, and played in the Division 2 Premiership team that season. They later played for the Happy Valley Football Club in the Adelaide Footy League during their draft year. They were recruited by Adelaide as a free agent in 2022 as a replacement player for Jasmyn Hewett who was unavailable due to work commitments.

Waterhouse made their AFL Women's debut in the round 5 thrashing of Greater Western Sydney at Unley Oval. They kicked a goal on debut. Waterhouse played their best game to date in 2023 when they kicked two goals in a semi-final against Sydney as a pressure small forward at Norwood Oval. After 15 games for the club, Waterhouse was delisted following the 2024 season.

== Post-career ==
Waterhouse returned to South Adelaide in the SANFL Women's in 2025, where they played during their time in the Crows' off-seasons. Waterhouse, living in Melbourne, Victoria, also played rugby union during this time.

On the June 30, 2025, Waterhouse transferred from South Adelaide to Power House AFC, who play in the Victorian Amateur Football Association (VAFA).

== Personal life ==
Waterhouse uses they/them pronouns. They are married to their wife Emma, and the couple have a prolific following on TikTok.

They are the niece of former Fremantle player Clive Waterhouse.
