= 2016 AFF U-19 Youth Championship squads =

The 2016 AFF U-19 Youth Championship was an international football tournament that was held in Vietnam from 11 September to 24 September. The 10 national teams involved in the tournament were required to register a squad of 23 players; only players in these squads are eligible to take part in the tournament. Ages are as of the first day of the tournament, 11 September 2016.

== Group A ==
=== Malaysia ===
Head Coach : (Germany) Frank Bernhardt

No.	Pos.	Player	Date of birth (age)	Caps	Goals	Club
1	GK	Muhammad Hazrull Hafiz Zulkifly	5 February 1997 (aged 19)	9	0	(Football Association of Malaysia) Penang FA U21
22	GK	Damien Lim Chien Khai	5 February 1997 (aged 19)	0	0	(Football Association of Malaysia) Selangor FA U21
23	GK	Nik Mohd Amin Ahmad	1 October 1997 (aged 18)	0	0	(Football Association of Malaysia) T–Team F.C. U21
3	DF	Dinesh Rajasingam	13 February 1998 (aged 18)	3	0	(Football Association of Malaysia) Pahang F.C.
4	DF	Muhammad Amir Safuan Mohamad Zubir	24 November 1997 (aged 18)	0	0	(Football Association of Malaysia) Perak FA U21
5	DF	Mohamad Hariz Kamarudin	2 July 1997 (aged 19)	2	0	(Football Association of Malaysia) Johor Darul Ta'zim II F.C. U21
8	DF	Muhammad Danish Haziq Saipul Hisham	12 September 1997 (aged 18)	5	0	(Football Association of Malaysia) Negeri Sembilan FA U21
15	DF	Mohamad Ramadhan Jalil	14 January 1998 (aged 18)	6	0	(Football Association of Malaysia) Kuala Lumpur FA U21
17	DF	Muhammad Aqil Irfanuddin Mohd Sabri	3 April 1997 (aged 19)	0	0	(Football Association of Malaysia) T–Team F.C. U21
18	DF	Tan Yung Hong	19 January 1997 (aged 19)	1	0	(Football Association of Malaysia) Kuala Lumpur FA U21
21	DF	Muhammad Al Mustaqim Mohd Rizuan	31 July 1997 (aged 19)	0	0	(Football Association of Malaysia) Melaka United U21
6	MF	Muhammad Rizalul Azuwan Supandri	26 April 1997 (aged 19)	3	0	(Football Association of Malaysia) Selangor FA U21
7	MF	Mohamad Faisal Abdul Halim	7 January 1998 (aged 18)	0	0	(Football Association of Malaysia) Pahang F.C.
9	MF	Thipanraj A/L Subramaniam	1 February 1997 (aged 19)	0	0	(Football Association of Malaysia) Kuala Lumpur FA U21
10	MF	Suwarnaraj A/L Chinniah	3 February 1998 (aged 18)	0	0	(Football Association of Malaysia) Perak FA U21
13	MF	Nik Muhammad Sharif Haseefy Mohd Lazim	30 May 1997 (aged 19)	0	0	(Football Association of Malaysia) Pahang F.C. U21
16	MF	Muhammad Shah Amirul Mohd Zamri	27 March 1998 (aged 18)	0	0	(Football Association of Malaysia) Pahang F.C.
19	MF	Muhammad Syahmi Safari (captain)	5 February 1998 (aged 18)	5	0	(Football Association of Malaysia) Selangor FA U21
20	MF	Mohd Zarulizwan Mazlan	19 January 1997 (aged 19)	0	0	(Football Association of Malaysia) T–Team F.C. U21
2	FW	Badrul Amin Rusalan	24 July 1997 (aged 19)	3	0	(Football Association of Malaysia) Selangor FA U21
11	FW	Muhd Jafri Muhammad Firdaus Chew	11 June 1997 (aged 19)	6	6	(Football Association of Malaysia) Penang FA
12	FW	Muhammad Danial Ashraf Abdullah	8 January 1997 (aged 19)	4	2	(Football Association of Malaysia) Kelantan FA U21
14	FW	Mohamed Syamer Kutty Abba	1 October 1997 (aged 18)	5	1	(Football Association of Malaysia) Penang FA U21

=== Philippines ===
Head Coach: Dan Sionosa Padernal

=== Singapore ===
Head Coach: Richard Tardy

No.	Pos.	Player	Date of birth (age)	Caps	Goals	Club
	GK	Ahmad Fadly	3 January 1997 (age 29)	0	0	(Football Association of Singapore) Tampines Rovers
	GK	Adib Hakim	9 March 1998 (age 28)	0	0	(Football Association of Singapore) NFA U18
	GK	Zharfan Rohaizad	21 February 1997 (age 29)	0	0	(Football Association of Singapore) Garena Young Lions
	DF	Rusyaidi Salime	25 April 1998 (age 28)	0	0	(Football Association of Singapore) Garena Young Lions
	DF	Hakeem Nazri	8 November 1998 (age 27)	0	0	(Football Association of Singapore) NFA U18
	DF	Amirul Hakim	4 June 1998 (age 28)	0	0	(Football Association of Singapore) NFA U18
	DF	Syahrul Sazali	3 June 1998 (age 28)	0	0	(Football Association of Singapore) NFA U18
	DF	Shafie Muliantoh	22 June 1997 (age 29)	0	0	(Football Association of Singapore) Tampines Rovers
	DF	Zulkhair Mustaffa	23 December 1997 (age 28)	0	0	(Football Association of Singapore) Balestier Khalsa
	DF	Shaqi Sulaiman	26 April 1997 (age 29)	0	0	(Football Association of Singapore) Home United
	DF	Lionel Tan	6 May 1997 (age 29)	0	0	(Football Association of Singapore) Home United
	DF	Ariyan Shamsuddin	20 August 1997 (age 28)	0	0	(Football Association of Singapore) Tampines Rovers
	MF	Jordan Chan	5 March 1998 (age 28)	0	0	(Football Association of Singapore) NFA U18
	MF	Gareth Low	28 February 1997 (age 29)	0	0	(Football Association of Singapore) Garena Young Lions
	MF	Nasrul Taib	10 October 1997 (age 28)	0	0	(Football Association of Singapore) Home United
	MF	Hami Syahin	16 November 1997 (age 28)	0	0	(Football Association of Singapore) Garena Young Lions
	MF	Zulqarnaen Suzliman	29 March 1998 (age 28)	0	0	(Football Association of Singapore) NFA U18
	MF	Joshua Pereira	10 October 1997 (age 28)	0	0	(Football Association of Singapore) Garena Young Lions
	MF	Saifullah Akbar	31 January 1999 (age 27)	0	0	(Football Association of Singapore) Tampines Rovers
	FW	Andin Addie	30 January 1997 (age 29)	0	0	(Football Association of Singapore) Tampines Rovers
	FW	Haiqal Pashia	29 November 1998 (age 27)	0	0	(Football Association of Singapore) NFA U18
	FW	Amiruldin Asraf	8 January 1998 (age 28)	0	0	(Football Association of Singapore) Home United
	FW	Naufal Azman	10 July 1998 (age 28)	0	0	(Football Association of Singapore) NFA U18

=== Timor Leste ===
Head Coach: (Japan) Shigeo Yamazaki

No.	Pos.	Player	Date of birth (age)	Caps	Goals	Club
1	GK	Aderito Raul Fernandes	15 May 1997 (aged 19)	7	0	(East Timor Football Federation) AS Ponta Leste
12	GK	Nuno		0	0	(East Timor Football Federation)
20	GK	Fagio Augusto (Captain)	29 April 1997 (aged 19)	12	0	(East Timor Football Federation) FC Porto Taibesi
2	DF	Candido (Vice-captain)	2 December 1997 (aged 18)	18	0	(East Timor Football Federation) AS Ponta Leste
3	DF	Armindo		6	0	(East Timor Football Federation)
4	DF	Ervino	30 May 1999 (aged 17)	9	1	(East Timor Football Federation) DIT FC
5	DF	Nelson	24 December 1999 (aged 16)	12	2	(East Timor Football Federation) Karketu Dili
6	DF	Feitas	24 April 1998 (aged 18)	13	0	(East Timor Football Federation) FC Porto Taibesi
13	DF	Denilson		1	0	(East Timor Football Federation)
22	DF	Osvaldo		4	0	(East Timor Football Federation)
23	DF	Agostinho	28 August 1997 (aged 19)	11	0	(East Timor Football Federation) FC Porto Taibesi
7	MF	José Oliveira	28 October 1997 (aged 18)	14	2	(East Timor Football Federation) SLB Laulara
8	MF	Feliciano Goncalves	11 February 1997 (aged 19)	6	0	(East Timor Football Federation) DIT FC
15	MF	Domingos Araujo	26 January 1999 (aged 17)	5	0	(East Timor Football Federation)
16	MF	Gaudencio Monteiro	2 July 1998 (aged 18)	12	1	(East Timor Football Federation)
17	MF	Gelvanio Costa	8 October 1998 (aged 17)	12	2	(East Timor Football Federation)
18	MF	Dom Lucas		0	0	(East Timor Football Federation)
19	MF	Abrao Mendonca	18 June 1997 (aged 19)	6	0	(East Timor Football Federation)
9	FW	Rufino Gama	20 June 1998 (aged 18)	12	4	(East Timor Football Federation) AS Académica
10	FW	Henrique	6 December 1997 (aged 18)	17	3	(East Timor Football Federation) DIT FC
11	FW	Kefi	27 January 1997 (aged 19)	13	5	(East Timor Football Federation) DIT FC
14	FW	Joao Pedro		5	0	(East Timor Football Federation)
21	FW	Ruben		0	0	(East Timor Football Federation)

=== Vietnam ===
Head Coach: Hoang Anh Tuan

No.	Pos.	Player	Date of birth (age)	Caps	Goals	Club
1	GK	Nguyễn Thanh Tuấn	16 February 1997 (aged 19)			(Vietnam Football Federation) PVF
36	GK	Nguyễn Bá Minh Hiếu	23 May 1997 (aged 19)			(Vietnam Football Federation) Hanoi T&T
38	GK	Đỗ Sỹ Huy	16 April 1998 (aged 18)			(Vietnam Football Federation) Cong An Nhan Dan F.C.
2	DF	Mạc Đức Việt Anh	16 January 1997 (aged 19)			(Vietnam Football Federation) PVF
8	DF	Trương Dũ Đạt	25 July 1997 (aged 19)			(Vietnam Football Federation) Becamex Bình Dương F.C.
9	DF	Trần Văn Hòa	22 March 1998 (aged 18)			(Vietnam Football Federation) PVF
17	DF	Đoàn Hải Quân	12 February 1997 (aged 19)			(Vietnam Football Federation) Đồng Tâm Long An F.C.
22	DF	Hồ Tấn Tài	6 November 1997 (aged 18)			(Vietnam Football Federation) Bình Định F.C.
3	MF	Trương Tiến Anh	25 April 1999 (aged 17)			(Vietnam Football Federation) Viettel F.C.
6	MF	Bùi Tiến Dụng	23 November 1998 (aged 17)			(Vietnam Football Federation) PVF
7	MF	Nguyễn Trọng Đại	7 April 1997 (aged 19)			(Vietnam Football Federation) Viettel F.C.
12	MF	Phan Thanh Hậu	12 January 1997 (aged 19)			(Vietnam Football Federation) Hoàng Anh Gia Lai F.C.
13	MF	Nguyễn Trọng Huy	25 June 1997 (aged 19)			(Vietnam Football Federation) Becamex Bình Dương F.C.
14	MF	Trần Duy Khánh	20 July 1997 (aged 19)			(Vietnam Football Federation) Becamex Bình Dương F.C.
16	MF	Lương Hoàng Nam	2 March 1997 (aged 19)			(Vietnam Football Federation) Hoàng Anh Gia Lai F.C.
18	MF	Hồ Minh Dĩ	17 February 1998 (aged 18)			(Vietnam Football Federation) PVF
20	MF	Lâm Thuận	20 November 1998 (aged 17)			(Vietnam Football Federation) PVF
21	MF	Hoàng Thế Tài	23 June 1998 (aged 18)			(Vietnam Football Federation) Viettel F.C.
23	MF	Nguyễn Quang Hải	12 April 1997 (aged 19)			(Vietnam Football Federation) Ha Noi F.C.
4	FW	Hà Đức Chinh	22 September 1997 (aged 18)			(Vietnam Football Federation) PVF
10	FW	Phạm Trọng Hóa	23 June 1998 (aged 18)			(Vietnam Football Federation) PVF
11	FW	Dương Văn Hào	15 February 1997 (aged 19)			(Vietnam Football Federation) Viettel F.C.
15	FW	Nguyễn Tiến Linh	20 October 1997 (aged 18)			(Vietnam Football Federation) Becamex Bình Dương F.C.

== Group B ==
=== Australia ===
Head Coach: Ufuk Talay

The following 23 players were selected: Caps and goals correct as of 7 October 2015.

No.	Pos.	Player	Date of birth (age)	Caps	Goals	Club
1	GK	Daniel Margush	28 November 1997 (age 28)	0	0	(Football Australia) Adelaide United
12	GK	Yaren Sozer	19 April 1997 (age 29)	0	0	(Football Australia) Melbourne City
18	GK	Jasko Keranovic	2 March 1998 (age 28)	0	0	(The Football Association) West Bromwich Albion
2	FW	William Mutch	27 February 1998 (age 28)	2	0	(Football Australia) Sydney FC
4	DF	Kye Rowles	24 June 1998 (age 28)	0	0	(Football Australia) Brisbane Roar
5	MF	Jackson Bandiera	16 April 1998 (age 28)	0	0	(Football Australia) Western Sydney Wanderers
11	DF	Connor O'Toole	1 January 1997 (age 29)	2	0	(Football Australia) Brisbane Roar
15	DF	Patrick Flottmann	19 April 1997 (age 29)	0	0	(Football Australia) Sydney FC
19	DF	George Timotheou	29 July 1997 (age 29)	1	0	(Football Australia) Sydney FC
21	MF	Brandon Vella	23 June 1998 (age 28)	0	0	(Football Australia) Marconi Stallions
6	MF	Liam Rose (Captain)	7 April 1997 (age 29)	8	0	(Football Australia) Central Coast Mariners
8	FW	Mario Shabow	5 May 1998 (age 28)	3	1	(Football Australia) Western Sydney Wanderers
10	MF	Tariq Maia	11 June 1997 (age 29)	0	0	(Football Australia) Western Sydney Wanderers
17	MF	Christopher Zuvela	21 January 1997 (age 29)	0	0	(Football Australia) Sydney FC
20	MF	Josh Hope	7 January 1998 (age 28)	0	0	(Football Australia) Melbourne Victory
22	MF	Keanu Baccus	7 June 1998 (age 28)	0	0	(Football Australia) Western Sydney Wanderers
23	MF	Liam Youlley	20 February 1997 (age 29)	8	0	(Football Australia) Western Sydney Wanderers
	MF	George Mells	23 May 1997 (age 29)	3	1	(Football Australia) Adelaide United
3	MF	Lachlan Scott	15 April 1997 (age 29)	0	0	(Football Australia) Western Sydney Wanderers
7	MF	Dejan Pandurevic	16 January 1997 (age 29)	3	1	(Football Australia) Manly United
9	FW	Jayden Prasad	5 February 1997 (age 29)	0	0	(Football Australia) Brisbane Roar
13	FW	George Blackwood	4 June 1997 (age 29)	7	1	(Football Australia) Sydney FC
14	FW	Joseph Champness	27 April 1997 (age 29)	0	0	(Football Australia) Brisbane Roar
16	FW	Steve Kuzmanovski	4 January 1997 (age 29)	7	4	(Football Australia) Melbourne City

=== Cambodia ===
The following 23 players were called up for the Cambodia Squad

Head Coach: (Japan) Kazunori Ohara

No.	Pos.	Player	Date of birth (age)	Caps	Goals	Club
1	GK	Keo Soksela (Captain)	1 August 1997 (aged 19)	1	0	(Football Federation of Cambodia) Phnom Penh Crown
22	GK	Kung Chanvuthy	6 May 1998 (aged 18)	0	0	(Football Federation of Cambodia) Phnom Penh Crown
	GK	Som Sokundara	1 June 1998 (aged 18)	0	0	(Football Federation of Cambodia) Nagaworld
2	DF	Sleh Sen	12 December 1998 (aged 17)	1	0	(Football Federation of Cambodia) CMAC United
3	DF	Chea Chandara	5 August 1999 (aged 17)	0	0	(Football Federation of Cambodia) Phnom Penh Crown
4	DF	Ly Vahed	26 December 1998 (aged 17)	6	0	(Football Federation of Cambodia) Boeung Ket Angkor
5	DF	Choun Chanchav	5 May 1999 (aged 17)	0	0	(Football Federation of Cambodia) Phnom Penh Crown
6	DF	Ken Chansopheak	15 June 1998 (aged 18)	0	0	(Football Federation of Cambodia) Phnom Penh Crown
7	DF	Suon Noeut	28 May 1999 (aged 17)	1	0	(Football Federation of Cambodia) Phnom Penh Crown
13	DF	Ouk Sovann	15 May 1998 (aged 18)	0	0	(Football Federation of Cambodia) Phnom Penh Crown
15	DF	Yue Safy	8 November 2000 (aged 15)	1	0	(Football Federation of Cambodia) Phnom Penh Crown
16	DF	Seut Baraing	29 September 1999 (aged 16)	1	0	(Football Federation of Cambodia) Phnom Penh Crown
8	MF	Orn Chanpolin	15 March 1998 (aged 18)	1	0	(Football Federation of Cambodia) Phnom Penh Crown
11	MF	Mat Sakrovy	5 December 1998 (aged 17)	0	0	(Football Federation of Cambodia) Phnom Penh Crown
12	MF	Sath Rosib	7 July 1997 (aged 19)	6	2	(Football Federation of Cambodia) Nagaworld
17	MF	Vat Samnang	4 May 1998 (aged 18)	0	0	(Football Federation of Cambodia) Phnom Penh Crown
19	MF	Cheng Meng	27 February 1998 (aged 18)	6	0	(Football Federation of Cambodia) Nagaworld
23	MF	In Sodavid	2 July 1998 (aged 18)	1	0	(Football Federation of Cambodia) Phnom Penh Crown
	MF	Kunthea Ravan	2 September 1999 (aged 17)	6	0	(Football Federation of Cambodia) Preah Khan Reach Svay Rieng
9	FW	Pov Ponvuthy	22 January 1998 (aged 18)	1	0	(Football Federation of Cambodia) Phnom Penh Crown
10	FW	Long Phearath	7 January 1998 (aged 18)	1	0	(Football Federation of Cambodia) Western Phnom Penh
14	FW	Mao Piseth	17 February 2000 (aged 16)	1	0	(Football Federation of Cambodia) Phnom Penh Crown
20	FW	Yeu Muslim	25 December 1998 (aged 17)	0	0	(Football Federation of Cambodia) Phnom Penh Crown

=== Indonesia ===
The following 23 players were called up for the Indonesia squad.

Head Coach:Eduard Tjong

No.	Pos.	Player	Date of birth (age)	Caps	Goals	Club
1	GK	Awan Setho	20 March 1997 (aged 19)	10	0	(Football Association of Indonesia) Persip Pekalongan
12	GK	Muhammad Riyandi	3 January 2000 (aged 16)	0	0	(Football Association of Indonesia) Barito Putera
22	GK	Satria Tama	23 January 1997 (aged 19)	2	0	(Football Association of Indonesia) Persegres Gresik United
2	DF	Ibrahim Sanjaya	26 August 1997 (aged 19)	2	0	(Football Association of Indonesia) Persip Pekalongan
3	DF	Arizky Wahyu	28 April 1998 (aged 18)	1	0	(Football Association of Indonesia) ASIFA
4	DF	Andy Setyo	16 September 1997 (aged 18)	2	0	(Football Association of Indonesia) Pusamania Borneo
5	DF	Bagas Adi (Captain)	8 March 1997 (aged 19)	2	0	(Football Association of Indonesia) Munial Sport Group
6	DF	Jujun Saepulloh	4 May 1998 (aged 18)	0	0	(Football Association of Indonesia) Persib Bandung
8	MF	Alwi Slamat	16 December 1998 (aged 17)	2	0	(Football Association of Indonesia) Semen Padang
10	MF	Muhammad Rafli	24 November 1998 (aged 17)	1	0	(Football Association of Indonesia) ASIFA
13	MF	Satria Wardana	23 March 1998 (aged 18)	0	0	(Football Association of Indonesia) PS Kwarta
14	MF	Asnawi Mangkualam	3 October 1999 (aged 16)	2	0	(Football Association of Indonesia) PSM Makassar
15	DF	Habibi	15 October 1998 (aged 17)	1	0	(Football Association of Indonesia) PS Bangka
17	MF	Syahrian Abimanyu	25 April 1999 (aged 17)	0	0	(Football Association of Indonesia) Munial Sport Group
18	MF	Chrystna Bhagascara	22 June 1998 (aged 18)	1	0	(Football Association of Indonesia) ASIFA
19	MF	Hanif Sjahbandi	7 April 1997 (aged 19)	0	0	(Football Association of Indonesia) Munial Sport Group
20	MF	Abdul Haris Tuakia	27 November 1997 (aged 18)	0	0	(Football Association of Indonesia) PPLM Indonesia
21	MF	Sandi Pratama	10 April 1997 (aged 19)	1	1	(Football Association of Indonesia) PS Bangka
24	MF	Nevy Dwaramury	1 November 1997 (aged 18)	1	1	(Football Association of Indonesia) PPLM Indonesia
7	FW	Dimas Drajad	30 March 1997 (aged 19)	15	10	(Football Association of Indonesia) PS TNI
9	FW	Saddil Ramdani	2 January 1999 (aged 17)	1	1	(Football Association of Indonesia) ASIFA
11	FW	Pandi Lestaluhu	7 August 1997 (aged 19)	0	0	(Football Association of Indonesia) PS TNI
25	FW	Edo Febriansah	25 July 1997 (aged 19)	1	1	(Football Association of Indonesia) PPLM Indonesia

=== Laos ===
Head coach: (Thailand) Phunthawat Suppavasantichon

No.	Pos.	Player	Date of birth (age)	Caps	Goals	Club
18	GK	Vilayphone Xayalath			0	
22	GK	Sengaloun Sihalath			0	
20	GK	Saymanolinh Praseuth			0	
2	DF	Santi Somphoupheth				
3	DF	Phimmasone Champathong				
4	DF	Piyaphong Pathammavong(c)	8 September 1998 (aged 18)			
6	DF	Khamphanh Sonthanalay	31 October 1997 (aged 18)			
11	DF	Latsamy Phachantha				
16	DF	Aphixay Thanakhanty				
19	DF	Sonesavanh Vannaxay				
21	DF	Bounphithak Chanthalangsy				
26	DF	Anouwath Phaphakdy				
5	MF	Maitee Hatsady	6 October 1998 (aged 17)			(Lao Football Federation) Lao Toyota
7	MF	Thanin Phanthavong				
17	MF	Somsavath Sorphabmixay				
20	MF	Vanna Bounlovongsa				
25	MF	Phatthana Phommathep				
29	MF	Vaithaya Sisongkham				
9	FW	Chitpasong Latthachack				
10	FW	Sinthanong Phanvongsa				
24	FW	Bounyang Chounlamonty				
33	FW	Somchit Sibounheuang				

=== Myanmar ===
The following 23 players were called up for the Myanmar Squad.

Head coach:Myo Hlaing Win

No.	Pos.	Player	Date of birth (age)	Caps	Goals	Club
1	GK	Phone Thitsar Min	6 November 1998 (aged 17)			(Myanmar Football Federation) Shan United Youth
13	GK	Sann Sat Naing	4 September 1998 (aged 18)			(Myanmar Football Federation) MFF Youth
-	GK	Aung Myo Htwe				(Myanmar Football Federation) Myawady Youth
2	DF	Hein Phyo Win	19 September 1998 (aged 17)			(Myanmar Football Federation) Shan United Youth
3	DF	Ye Min Thu				(Myanmar Football Federation) Shan United Youth
4	DF	Ye Yint Aung (c)	26 February 1998 (aged 18)			(Myanmar Football Federation) Yadanarbon
5	DF	Soe Moe Tun	6 January 1998 (aged 18)			(Myanmar Football Federation) MFF Youth
12	DF	Kyaw Swar Win				(Myanmar Football Federation) Zwekapin United Youth
24	DF	Win Moe Kyaw	1 February 1997 (aged 19)			(Myanmar Football Federation) Magwe Youth
-	DF	Min Ye Htut				(Myanmar Football Federation) Rakhine United Youth
-	DF	Thu Rein Soe	4 September 1998 (age 27)			(Myanmar Football Federation) Yangon United Youth
6	MF	Aung Naing Win				(Myanmar Football Federation) Yadanarbon Youth
7	MF	Myat Tun Thit	19 February 1998 (age 28)			(Myanmar Football Federation) Shan United Youth
8	MF	Zwe Thet Paing				(Myanmar Football Federation) MFF Youth
15	MF	Wai Yan	3 August 1998 (aged 18)			(Myanmar Football Federation) Shan United Youth
16	MF	Aung Moe Thu				(Myanmar Football Federation) MFF Youth
21	MF	Myint Tun Naing				(Myanmar Football Federation) Magwe Youth
-	MF	Thet Aung				(Myanmar Football Federation) Hanthawaddy United Youth
-	MF	Oakkar Maung				(Myanmar Football Federation) Horizon Youth
9	FW	Shwe Ko	13 January 1998 (aged 18)			(Myanmar Football Federation) Shan United Youth
10	FW	Sa Aung Pyae Ko				(Myanmar Football Federation) Shan United Youth
17	FW	Aung Kaung Mann	18 February 1998 (aged 18)			(Myanmar Football Federation) Ayeyawady United Youth
-	FW	Zaw Pauk				(Myanmar Football Federation) Zayar Shwe Myay Youth

=== Thailand ===
The following 23 players were called up for the Thailand squad.

Head Coach:Anurak Srikerd

No.	Pos.	Player	Date of birth (age)	Caps	Goals	Club
1	GK	Korraphat Nareechan	7 October 1997 (aged 18)			(Football Association of Thailand) Bangkok Glass
23	GK	Taro Prasarnkarn	27 November 1997 (aged 18)			(Football Association of Thailand) Assumption College Sriracha
30	GK	Chakhon Philakhlang	8 March 1998 (aged 18)			(Football Association of Thailand) Chonburi
2	DF	Arthit Kansangwet	22 July 1998 (aged 18)			(Football Association of Thailand) Phan Thong
3	DF	Athit Auea-fuea	7 January 1997 (aged 19)			(Football Association of Thailand) Rangsit
5	DF	Jakkrapong Suabsamutr	27 August 1998 (aged 18)			(Football Association of Thailand) Super Power Samut Prakan
7	DF	Wisarut Imura	18 October 1997 (aged 18)			(Football Association of Thailand) Bangkok United
13	DF	Sarayut Sompim	23 March 1997 (aged 19)			(Football Association of Thailand) Bangkok United
16	DF	Saringkan Promsupa	29 March 1997 (aged 19)			(Football Association of Thailand) Rayong
26	DF	Ariyapol Chanson	17 April 1998 (aged 18)			(Football Association of Thailand) Samut Prakan United
32	DF	Sorawit Panthong	20 February 1997 (aged 19)			(Football Association of Thailand) Muangthong United
33	DF	Chotipat Poomkeaw	28 May 1998 (aged 18)			(Football Association of Thailand) Chiangrai United
6	MF	Natkanet Jintapaphuthanasiri	1 May 1997 (aged 19)			(Football Association of Thailand) Port
8	MF	Suksan Mungpao	5 March 1997 (aged 19)			(Football Association of Thailand) Phrae United
10	MF	Sansern Limwattana	31 July 1997 (aged 19)			(Football Association of Thailand) Bangkok United
15	MF	Jaroensak Wonggorn	18 May 1997 (aged 19)			(Football Association of Thailand) Air Force Central
17	MF	Jakkit Wechpirom	26 January 1997 (aged 19)			(Football Association of Thailand) Chainat Hornbill
22	MF	Worachit Kanitsribampen (Captain)	24 August 1997 (aged 19)			(Football Association of Thailand) Chonburi
27	MF	Techin Mooktarakosa	18 April 1997 (aged 19)			(Football Association of Thailand) Port
11	FW	Nantawat Suankaeo	8 December 1997 (aged 18)			(Football Association of Thailand) Bangkok Glass
21	FW	Supachai Jaided	1 December 1998 (aged 17)			(Football Association of Thailand) Super Power Samut Prakan
28	FW	Sittichok Phaso	28 January 1999 (aged 17)			(Football Association of Thailand) Chonburi
35	FW	Sirimongkhon Jitbanjong	8 August 1997 (aged 19)			(Football Association of Thailand) Simork
