= 2015 AFF U-19 Youth Championship squads =

The 2015 AFF U-19 Youth Championship was an international football tournament that was held in Laos from 22 August until 4 September. The 10 national teams involved in the tournament were required to register a squad of 23 players; only players in these squads are eligible to take part in the tournament.

== Group A ==
=== Thailand ===
Head coach: Anurak Srikerd

No.	Pos.	Player	Date of birth (age)	Caps	Goals	Club
1	GK	Taro Prasarnkarn	27 November 1997 (aged 17)			(Football Association of Thailand) Assumption College Sriracha
2	DF	Arthit Kansangwet	22 July 1998 (aged 17)			(Football Association of Thailand) Chonburi F.C. Reserves and Academy
4	DF	Tirapon Thanachartkun	23 August 1998 (aged 16)			(Football Association of Thailand) Assumption United
5	DF	Adisak Narattho	4 September 1998 (aged 16)			(Football Association of Thailand) Osotspa Samut Prakan
7	MF	Kittanai Mooktarakosa	18 April 1997 (aged 18)			(Football Association of Thailand) TOT
8	FW	Suksan Mungpao	5 March 1997 (aged 18)			(Football Association of Thailand) Assumption College Sriracha
9	FW	Veerapong Khorayok	30 May 1997 (aged 18)			(Football Association of Thailand)
10	MF	Sansern Limwatthana	31 July 1997 (aged 18)			(Football Association of Thailand) Phichit
11	FW	Ritthidet Phensawat	21 March 1997 (aged 18)			(Football Association of Thailand) Phan Thong
12	MF	Kanarin Thawornsak	27 May 1997 (aged 18)			(Football Association of Thailand) BCC Tero
13	DF	Sarayut Sompim	23 March 1997 (aged 18)			(Football Association of Thailand) Bangkok United
14	MF	Wisarut Imura	18 October 1997 (aged 17)			(Football Association of Thailand) Bangkok United
15	MF	Phattharaphon Jansuwan	22 April 1997 (aged 18)			(Football Association of Thailand)
16	DF	Saringkan Promsupa	29 March 1997 (aged 18)			(Football Association of Thailand) Rayong
17	FW	Jakkit Wachpirom	26 January 1997 (aged 18)			(Football Association of Thailand) Bangkok United
19	MF	Nithipat Boriboonwat	4 November 1997 (aged 17)			(Football Association of Thailand)
20	DF	Meechok Marhasaranukun	12 December 1997 (aged 17)			(Football Association of Thailand) TOT
21	MF	Supachai Jaided	1 December 1998 (aged 16)			(Football Association of Thailand) Port F.C. Academy
23	DF	Sirapop Saardeim	16 July 1998 (aged 17)			(Football Association of Thailand)
24	MF	Worachit Kanitsribampen (c)	24 August 1997 (aged 17)			(Football Association of Thailand) Chonburi
27	MF	Anon Amornlerdsak	6 November 1997 (aged 17)			(Football Association of Thailand) Buriram United
29	MF	Sakdipat Kotchasri	6 July 1997 (aged 18)			(Football Association of Thailand) Debsirindra School
30	GK	Chakhon Philakhlang	8 March 1998 (aged 17)			(Football Association of Thailand) Chonburi

=== Cambodia ===
Head coach: Hok Sochivorn

No.	Pos.	Player	Date of birth (age)	Caps	Goals	Club
1	GK	Som Sokundara				(Football Federation of Cambodia) Nagaworld FC
18	GK	Om Channou				(Football Federation of Cambodia) Boeung Ket Angkor
22	GK	Um Sereyroth (c)				(Football Federation of Cambodia) National Defense Ministry FC
6	DF	Pom Darang				(Football Federation of Cambodia) National Defense Ministry FC
5	DF	Roeurm Channroeurn				(Football Federation of Cambodia) National Defense Ministry FC
21	DF	Chin Vannak				(Football Federation of Cambodia) Nagaworld FC
4	DF	Ly Vahed				(Football Federation of Cambodia) Boeung Ket Angkor
2	DF	Prak Sovannpiseth				(Football Federation of Cambodia) Svay Rieng Fc
3	DF	Ouk Vanne				(Football Federation of Cambodia) Svay Rieng Fc
15	DF	Thong Vichea				(Football Federation of Cambodia) Build Bright United
13	DF	Sleh Sen				(Football Federation of Cambodia) Build Bright United
14	MF	Ouch Panhaseth				(Football Federation of Cambodia) Build Bright United
17	MF	Sok Heang				(Football Federation of Cambodia) National Defense Ministry FC
7	MF	Chrerng Polroth				(Football Federation of Cambodia) National Defense Ministry FC
24	MF	Men Monira				(Football Federation of Cambodia) Svay Rieng Fc
16	MF	Kim Hap				(Football Federation of Cambodia) Svay Rieng Fc B
8	MF	Kunthea Ravan				(Football Federation of Cambodia) Svay Rieng Fc
11	MF	Sath Rosib				(Football Federation of Cambodia) Nagaworld FC
23	MF	Cheng Meng				(Football Federation of Cambodia) Nagaworld FC
10	FW	Cheam Ratana				(Football Federation of Cambodia) Svay Rieng Fc B
9	FW	Touch Roma				(Football Federation of Cambodia) National Defense Ministry FC
12	FW	Chantha Thunthean				(Football Federation of Cambodia) Asia Europe United
19	FW	Sun Vandeth				(Football Federation of Cambodia) National Police Commissary

=== Brunei ===
Head coach: (South Korea) Kwon Oh-son

No.	Pos.	Player	Date of birth (age)	Caps	Goals	Club
1	GK	Zulfadli Ahzaman	3 January 1998 (age 28)			(Football Association of Brunei Darussalam) Sewira FC
18	GK	Norhamizan Hj Muhammad	30 March 1998 (age 28)			(Football Association of Brunei Darussalam) Tabuan U18
20	GK	Ishyra Asmian Jabidi	9 July 1998 (age 28)			(Football Association of Brunei Darussalam) Tabuan U18
3	DF	Mohd Akif Roslan	17 September 1997 (age 28)			(Football Association of Brunei Darussalam) Tabuan U18
4	DF	Haziq Kasyful Azim	24 December 1998 (age 27)			(Football Association of Brunei Darussalam) Tabuan U18
5	DF	Ansarilezan Jamaluddin	10 June 1997 (age 29)			(Football Association of Brunei Darussalam) Tabuan U18
6	DF	Rahimin Abdul Ghani	31 May 1999 (age 27)			(Football Association of Brunei Darussalam) Tabuan U18
13	DF	Alimuddin Jamaludin	9 August 1997 (age 28)			(Football Association of Brunei Darussalam) Tabuan U18
14	DF	Martin Haddy Hj Khallidden	21 April 1998 (age 28)			(Football Association of Brunei Darussalam) Tabuan U18
15	DF	Md Yuzun Hj Ishak	31 December 1998 (age 27)			(Football Association of Brunei Darussalam) Tabuan U18
22	DF	Hanif Hamir	22 February 1997 (age 29)			(Football Association of Brunei Darussalam) Tabuan Muda
2	MF	Faezuddin Haris Nasution	7 March 1997 (age 29)			(Football Association of Brunei Darussalam) Tabuan U18
7	MF	Md Azwan Samsul Bahrin	1 July 1999 (age 27)			(Football Association of Brunei Darussalam) Tabuan U18
8	MF	Abdul Mateen Said	27 February 1999 (age 27)			(Football Association of Brunei Darussalam) Tabuan U18
16	MF	Afif Hadi Roshidi	4 March 1998 (age 28)			(Football Association of Brunei Darussalam) Tabuan U18
17	MF	Md Amin Hj Sisa	2 January 1998 (age 28)			(Football Association of Brunei Darussalam) Tabuan U18
19	MF	Nur Fikri Kamaluddin	16 April 1998 (age 28)			(Football Association of Brunei Darussalam) Tabuan U18
9	FW	Aaiman Muqmin Hj Baharudin	16 May 1998 (age 28)			(Football Association of Brunei Darussalam) Tabuan U18
10	FW	Nazirrudin Hj Ismail	27 December 1998 (age 27)			(Football Association of Brunei Darussalam) Tabuan U18
11	FW	Jumatatul Aleshahrezan Metali	26 February 1999 (age 27)			(Football Association of Brunei Darussalam) Tabuan U18
12	FW	Abdul Mateen Yazid Dary Shah	4 May 1999 (age 27)			(Football Association of Brunei Darussalam) Indera SC
21	FW	Nurul Hadi Yusof	31 July 1997 (age 29)			(Football Association of Brunei Darussalam) Tabuan U18
23	FW	Azri Aspar	21 June 1999 (age 27)			(Football Association of Brunei Darussalam) Indera SC

=== Philippines ===
Head coach: Dan Padernal

No.	Pos.	Player	Date of birth (age)	Caps	Goals	Club
1	GK	Michael Asong	3 October 1998 (age 27)			
2	GK	Jake Allen Vicen	2 June 1997 (age 29)			
22	GK	Harel Dayan	18 June 1998 (age 28)			
3	DF	JRV Malayo	3 August 1997 (age 29)			
4	DF	Dean Ebarle	20 April 1998 (age 28)			
5	DF	Marco Casambre	18 December 1998 (age 27)			(Philippine Football Federation) Global
6	DF	Josh Miller	29 May 1998 (age 28)			
11	DF	Jose Clarino	1 February 1997 (age 29)			
16	DF	Christian Lapas	10 November 1998 (age 27)			
26	DF	Rexon Capellan	7 February 1998 (age 28)			
29	DF	Ross Lawagan	3 January 1999 (age 27)			
31	DF	Paulo Javier	31 January 1998 (age 28)			
31	DF	Simplicio Mantal Jr.	12 October 1998 (age 27)			
7	MF	Mathew Custodio	29 July 1997 (age 29)			
14	MF	Kenneth Dizon	3 December 1997 (age 28)			
17	MF	Patrick Valenzuela	10 November 1998 (age 27)			
21	MF	Jerome Marzan	12 June 1997 (age 29)			
35	MF	Mark Winhoffer	1 March 1999 (age 27)			(Philippine Football Federation) Global
8	FW	Jeremiah Borlongan	8 December 1998 (age 27)			
9	FW	Dimitri Limbo	8 December 1998 (age 27)			
12	FW	Mar Diano	24 July 1997 (age 29)			
18	FW	James Ivan Oberiano	10 November 1998 (age 27)			
20	FW	Chima Uzoka	12 June 1998 (age 28)			

== Group B ==
=== Malaysia ===
Head coach: Hassan Sazali Waras

No.	Pos.	Player	Date of birth (age)	Caps	Goals	Club
1	GK	Muhammad Hazrull Hafiz Zulkifly	5 February 1997 (age 29)			(Football Association of Malaysia) Harimau Muda C
25	GK	Khatul Anuar Md Jalil	2 April 1997 (age 29)			(Football Association of Malaysia) Harimau Muda C
5	DF	Muhammad Nazirul Afif Ibrahim	30 April 1997 (age 29)			(Football Association of Malaysia) Harimau Muda C
6	DF	Muhamad Hafiy Haikal Ismail	24 April 1998 (age 28)			(Football Association of Malaysia) Harimau Muda C
8	DF	Muhamad Danish Haziq Saipul Hisham	12 September 1997 (age 28)			(Football Association of Malaysia) Harimau Muda C
10	DF	Tan Yung Hong	19 January 1997 (age 29)			(Football Association of Malaysia) Harimau Muda C
15	DF	Mohamad Hariz Kamarudin	2 July 1997 (age 29)			(Football Association of Malaysia) Harimau Muda C
21	DF	Mohamad Ramadhan Jalil	14 January 1998 (age 28)			(Football Association of Malaysia) Harimau Muda C
26	DF	Muhammad Izzat Mohd Ramlee	21 June 1997 (age 29)			(Football Association of Malaysia) Harimau Muda C
7	MF	Muhammad Rizalul Azuwan Supandri	26 April 1997 (age 29)			(Football Association of Malaysia) Harimau Muda C
9	MF	Nik Azli Nik Alias	26 January 1997 (age 29)			(Football Association of Malaysia) Harimau Muda C
13	MF	Mohd Aiman Shakir Mohd Hashim	16 October 1997 (age 28)			(Football Association of Malaysia) Harimau Muda C
18	MF	Dominic Tan Jun Jin (c)	12 March 1997 (age 29)			(Football Association of Malaysia) Harimau Muda C
19	MF	Muhammad Syahmi Safari	5 February 1998 (age 28)			(Football Association of Malaysia) Harimau Muda C
20	MF	Mohammad Fitri Amani Ismail	10 February 1997 (age 29)			(Football Association of Malaysia) Harimau Muda C
24	MF	Thipanraj a/l Subramaniam	1 February 1997 (age 29)			(Football Association of Malaysia) Harimau Muda C
27	MF	Muhammad Shahrul Akmal Md Adnan	13 March 1998 (age 28)			(Football Association of Malaysia) Harimau Muda C
29	MF	Muhammad Shah Amirul Mohd Zamri	27 March 1998 (age 28)			(Football Association of Malaysia) Harimau Muda C
2	FW	Badrul Amin Rusalan	24 July 1997 (age 29)			(Football Association of Malaysia) Harimau Muda C
11	FW	Muhammad Jafri Muhammad Firdaus Chew	11 June 1997 (age 29)			(Football Association of Malaysia) Harimau Muda C
12	FW	Kogileswaran Raj a/l Mohana Raj	21 September 1998 (age 27)			(Football Association of Malaysia) Harimau Muda C
14	FW	Mohamed Syamer Kutty Abba	1 October 1997 (age 28)			(Football Association of Malaysia) Harimau Muda C
17	FW	Muhammad Danial Ashraf Abdullah	8 January 1997 (age 29)			(Football Association of Malaysia) Harimau Muda C

=== Myanmar ===
Head coach: (Germany) Gerd Friedrich

No.	Pos.	Player	Date of birth (age)	Caps	Goals	Club
1	GK	Soe Arkar	1 October 1997 (age 28)			(Myanmar Football Federation) Zwekapin United Youth
18	GK	Phone Thit Sar Min	6 November 1998 (age 27)			(Myanmar Football Federation) MFF Youth
30	GK	Tun Aung Kyaw	17 May 1997 (age 29)			(Myanmar Football Federation) Horizon
2	DF	Chan Myae Tun	3 July 1997 (age 29)			(Myanmar Football Federation) Magway Youth
3	DF	Kyaw Thu Tun	19 October 1998 (age 27)			(Myanmar Football Federation) Yadanarbon Youth
4	DF	Win Moe Kyaw	1 February 1997 (age 29)			(Myanmar Football Federation) Magway Youth
5	DF	Ye Yint Aung	26 February 1998 (age 28)			(Myanmar Football Federation) MFF Youth
14	DF	Thurein Soe	4 September 1998 (age 27)			(Myanmar Football Federation) Yangon United Youth
15	DF	Soe Moe Tun	6 January 1998 (age 28)			(Myanmar Football Federation) MFF Youth
19	DF	Lwin Min Thant	7 March 1997 (age 29)			(Myanmar Football Federation) Horizon
23	DF	Kyaw Thet Oo	22 May 1997 (age 29)			(Myanmar Football Federation) Yadanarbon Youth
24	DF	Kyaw Ko Ko Oo	17 February 1997 (age 29)			(Myanmar Football Federation) MFF Youth
6	MF	Zar Nay Ya Thu	9 March 1999 (age 27)			(Myanmar Football Federation) MFF Youth
7	MF	Zin Phyo Aung (c)	6 November 1997 (age 28)			(Myanmar Football Federation) Zwekapin United
8	MF	Soe Lwin Lwin	13 August 1998 (age 27)			(Myanmar Football Federation) Manaw Myay Youth
11	MF	Aung Phyo Phyo	5 October 1997 (age 28)			(Myanmar Football Federation) Ayeyawady United Youth
13	MF	Zaw Win Tun	25 November 1998 (age 27)			(Myanmar Football Federation) Mawyawadi Youth
17	MF	Sis Min	21 January 1997 (age 29)			(Myanmar Football Federation) Zeyar Shwe Myay Youth
9	FW	Aung Kaung Mann	18 February 1998 (age 28)			(Myanmar Football Federation) Ayeyawady United Youth
10	FW	Aung Zaw Phyo	1 June 1997 (age 29)			(Myanmar Football Federation) Yadanarbon Youth
12	FW	Arkar	16 February 1997 (age 29)			(Myanmar Football Federation) Myawady Youth
16	FW	Aung Zin Phyo	10 May 1998 (age 28)			(Myanmar Football Federation) Horizon
21	FW	Kaung Chit Naing	20 May 1997 (age 29)			(Myanmar Football Federation) Southern Myanmar Youth

=== Singapore ===
Head coach: (Japan) Inoue Takuya

No.	Pos.	Player	Date of birth (age)	Caps	Goals	Club
1	GK	Benedict Loh Ye-Yang	23 July 1997 (age 29)			
17	GK	Ahmad Fadly Mohamed Tamiri	1 March 1997 (age 29)			
29	GK	Muhammad Zharfan Rohaizad	21 February 1997 (age 29)			
2	DF	Aide Shazwandi Abd Talib	13 January 1997 (age 29)			
3	DF	Lionel Tan Han Wei (c)	5 June 1997 (age 29)			
5	DF	Muhammad Shah Zulkarnaen Mohammed Suhaimi	23 September 1997 (age 28)			
16	DF	Ribiyanda Saswadimata	5 February 1997 (age 29)			
19	DF	Mohammad Shahrul Affandy Mohamed Fazil	24 February 1998 (age 28)			
8	MF	Gareth Low Jun Kit (Liu Junjie)	28 February 1997 (age 29)			
11	MF	Karthik Raj S/O Manimaren	1 August 1997 (age 29)			
12	MF	Muhammad Syafiq Irawan	29 May 1997 (age 29)			
13	MF	Muhammad Hami Syahin Said	16 December 1998 (age 27)			
15	MF	Muhammad Zulkhair Mustaffa	23 December 1997 (age 28)			
24	MF	Haiqal Pashia Anugrah	29 November 1998 (age 27)			
33	MF	Justin Hui Yong Kang	17 February 1998 (age 28)			
34	MF	Muhammad Hirzee Sahir	19 April 1997 (age 29)			
7	FW	Adnin Addie Djayady Agustino Saman	30 January 1997 (age 29)			
9	FW	Muhammad Amiruldin Asraf Muhammad Nodin	8 January 1997 (age 29)			
10	FW	Muhammad Ariyan Shamsuddun Malik	20 August 1997 (age 28)			
23	FW	Jordan Chan Zhi Wei	5 March 1998 (age 28)			
25	FW	Muhammad Syukri Mohd Basir	11 April 1998 (age 28)			

=== Timor-Leste ===
Head coach: (Japan) Takuma Koga

No.	Pos.	Player	Date of birth (age)	Caps	Goals	Club
1	GK	Fagio Augusto Da Silva Pereira	29 April 1997 (age 29)			
13	GK	Aderito Raul Fernandes	15 May 1997 (age 29)			
2	DF	Agostinho da Silva Araujo (C)	28 August 1997 (age 28)			
3	DF	Ervino Alessandro Pedro Soares	30 May 1999 (age 27)			
4	DF	Candino Monteiro De Oliveira	2 December 1997 (age 28)			
6	DF	Jose Guterres Silva	24 April 1998 (age 28)			
15	DF	Abrao Costa Alegria Mendonca	18 June 1997 (age 29)			
25	DF	Jaimito Antonio Da Costa Soares	10 June 1999 (age 27)			
5	MF	Jose Maria Dos Reis Dias Oliveira	28 October 1997 (age 28)			
12	MF	Nelson Sarmento Viegas	24 December 1999 (age 26)			
14	MF	Amilcar Oscar Baptista Belo	3 April 1997 (age 29)			
16	MF	Gelvanio Angelo De Costa M. Alberto	8 October 1998 (age 27)			
17	MF	Armando Varela	1 March 1997 (age 29)			
18	MF	Domingos Jose Alves Araujo	26 January 1999 (age 27)			
20	MF	Gaudencio Armindo Monteiro	2 July 1998 (age 28)			
21	MF	Melchior Jose Elias Ribeiro	26 May 1997 (age 29)			
7	FW	Rufino Walter Gama	20 June 1998 (age 28)			
9	FW	Henrique Wilsons Da Cruz Martins	6 December 1997 (age 28)			
10	FW	Frangcyatma Alves Ima Kefi	27 January 1997 (age 29)			
11	FW	Ricardo Correia Mendonca	8 October 1998 (age 27)			

=== Vietnam ===
Head coach: Hoàng Anh Tuấn

No.	Pos.	Player	Date of birth (age)	Caps	Goals	Club
1	GK	Nguyễn Thanh Tuấn	16 February 1997 (age 29)			(Vietnam Football Federation) PVF
36	GK	Nguyễn Bá Minh Hiếu	23 May 1997 (age 29)			(Vietnam Football Federation) Ha Noi T&T
38	GK	Đỗ Sỹ Huy	16 April 1998 (age 28)			(Vietnam Football Federation) Công an Nhân dân
2	DF	Mạc Đức Việt Anh	16 January 1997 (age 29)			(Vietnam Football Federation) PVF
8	DF	Trương Dũ Đạt	25 July 1997 (age 29)			(Vietnam Football Federation) Becamex Bình Dương
9	DF	Trần Văn Hòa	22 March 1998 (age 28)			(Vietnam Football Federation) PVF
17	DF	Đoàn Hải Quân	12 February 1997 (age 29)			(Vietnam Football Federation) Đồng Tâm Long An
22	DF	Hồ Tấn Tài	6 November 1997 (age 28)			(Vietnam Football Federation) Bình Định
3	MF	Trương Tiến Anh	25 April 1999 (age 27)			(Vietnam Football Federation) Viettel
6	MF	Bùi Tiến Dụng	23 November 1998 (age 27)			(Vietnam Football Federation) PVF
7	MF	Nguyễn Trọng Đại	7 April 1997 (age 29)			(Vietnam Football Federation) Viettel
12	MF	Phan Thanh Hậu	12 January 1997 (age 29)			(Vietnam Football Federation) Hoàng Anh Gia Lai
13	MF	Nguyễn Trọng Huy	25 June 1997 (age 29)			(Vietnam Football Federation) Becamex Bình Dương
14	MF	Trần Duy Khánh	20 July 1997 (age 29)			(Vietnam Football Federation) Becamex Bình Dương
16	MF	Lương Hoàng Nam	2 March 1997 (age 29)			(Vietnam Football Federation) Hoàng Anh Gia Lai
18	MF	Hồ Minh Dĩ	17 February 1998 (age 28)			(Vietnam Football Federation) PVF
20	MF	Lâm Thuận	20 November 1998 (age 27)			(Vietnam Football Federation) PVF
21	MF	Hoàng Thế Tài	23 June 1998 (age 28)			(Vietnam Football Federation) Viettel
23	MF	Nguyễn Quang Hải	12 April 1997 (age 29)			(Vietnam Football Federation) Ha Noi F.C.
4	FW	Hà Đức Chinh	22 September 1997 (age 28)			(Vietnam Football Federation) PVF
10	FW	Phạm Trọng Hóa	23 June 1998 (age 28)			(Vietnam Football Federation) PVF
11	FW	Dương Văn Hào	15 February 1997 (age 29)			(Vietnam Football Federation) Viettel
15	FW	Nguyễn Tiến Linh	20 October 1997 (age 28)			(Vietnam Football Federation) Becamex Bình Dương
