= 2015 AFF U-19 Youth Championship =

2015 AFF U-19 ແຊ້ມເຍົາວະຊົນ

Tournament details
- Host country: Laos
- City: Vientiane
- Dates: 22 August – 4 September
- Teams: 11 (from 1 confederation)
- Venue: 1 (in 1 host city)

Final positions
- Champions: Thailand (4th title)
- Runners-up: Vietnam
- Third place: Laos
- Fourth place: Malaysia

Tournament statistics
- Matches played: 24
- Goals scored: 79 (3.29 per match)
- Top scorer(s): (Thailand) Worachit Kanitsribampen (6 goals)

The 2015 AFF U-19 Youth Championship was the 13th edition of the tournament which was held in Laos for the first time between 22 August to 4 September 2015. It was initially going to be played in Indonesia but they were suspended by FIFA in May 2015.

Japan are the defending champions, however they participated in the previous tournament as guests so their achievements will not be counted in this tournament.

== Teams ==
All twelve member associations of the ASEAN Football Federation were set to take part in the tournament featuring three groups of four teams, but with Indonesia's suspension, they were omitted and the AFF reverted to two groups featuring six and five teams.

The following groups were drawn at the 15th AFF Council meeting in Singapore on 16 June 2015.

Pot A	Pot B
Thailand; Cambodia; Brunei; Philippines; Laos; Australia (withdrew)	Vietnam; Myanmar; Singapore; Timor-Leste; Malaysia

== Venue ==
Vientiane
Laos National Stadium	Location of stadiums of the 2015 AFF U-19 Youth Championship.
Capacity: 25,000	Location of stadiums of the 2015 AFF U-19 Youth Championship.

== Group stage ==
- All matches were held in Laos.
- All times were local, LST (UTC+7).

=== Group A ===
Pos	Team	Pld	W	D	L	GF	GA	GD	Pts	Qualification
1	Thailand	4	4	0	0	18	2	+16	12	Knockout stage
2	Laos (H)	4	2	1	1	9	3	+6	7	Knockout stage
3	Cambodia	4	2	1	1	6	7	−1	7	
4	Philippines	4	1	0	3	4	9	−5	3	
5	Brunei	4	0	0	4	2	18	−16	0	
6	Australia	0	0	0	0	0	0	0	0	Withdrawn

Source: AFF
(H) Hosts
22 August 2015
16:00

Brunei	1−2	Philippines
Mateen 55'	Report	Custodio 33', 42'

Laos National Stadium, Vientiane
Referee: Win Htut (Myanmar)
22 August 2015
19:00

Cambodia	0−0	Laos
	Report

Laos National Stadium, Vientiane
Referee: Ahmed Sifan Abdul Raheem (Maldives)

24 August 2015
16:00

Cambodia	5–1	Brunei
Rosib 9', 39'; Vandeth 40'; Vannak 50'; Roma 74'	Report	Akif 86'

Laos National Stadium, Vientiane
Referee: Ahmed Sifan Abdul Raheem (Maldives)
24 August 2015
19:00

Laos	1–2	Thailand
Phanvongsa 69'	Report	Jakkit 9', 43'

Laos National Stadium, Vientiane
Referee: Shuhaizi Shukri (Malaysia)

26 August 2015
16:00

Thailand	4–1	Philippines
Worachit 9'; Sansern 21'; Suksan 30', 51'	Report	Winhoffer 81' (pen.)

Laos National Stadium, Vientiane
Referee: Shuhaizi Shukri (Malaysia)
26 August 2015
19:00

Laos	5–0	Brunei
Xayalin 13'; Phanvongsa 22', 79'; Aphideth 50'; Keohanam 73'	Report

Laos National Stadium, Vientiane
Referee: Win Htut (Myanmar)

28 August 2015
16:00

Philippines	0−1	Cambodia
	Report	Polroth 40'

Laos National Stadium, Vientiane
Referee: Win Htut (Myanmar)
28 August 2015
19:00

Brunei	0–6	Thailand
	Report	Sansern 21'; Rahimin 26' (o.g.); Phattharaphon 53'; Wisarut 72', 89'; Supachai 82'

Laos National Stadium, Vientiane
Referee: Steve Supresencia (Philippines)

30 August 2015
16:00

Thailand	6−0	Cambodia
Ritthidet 15'; Jakkit 72'; Worachit 81', 83'; Supachai 87', 90+1'	Report

Laos National Stadium, Vientiane
Referee: Shuhaizi Shukri (Malaysia)
30 August 2015
19:00

Laos	3−1	Philippines
Pathammavong 11', 37'; Diano 8' (o.g.)	Report	Winhoffer 72'

Laos National Stadium, Vientiane
Referee: Win Htut (Myanmar)

=== Group B ===
Pos	Team	Pld	W	D	L	GF	GA	GD	Pts	Qualification
1	Vietnam	4	3	1	0	10	0	+10	10	Knockout stage
2	Malaysia	4	2	1	1	6	2	+4	7	Knockout stage
3	Myanmar	4	2	1	1	3	3	0	7	
4	Timor-Leste	4	0	2	2	3	6	−3	2	
5	Singapore	4	0	1	3	1	12	−11	1	

Source: AFF
23 August 2015
16:00

Singapore	0−1	Myanmar
	Report	Kaung Chit Naing 76'

Laos National Stadium, Vientiane
Referee: Steve Supresencia (Philippines)
23 August 2015
19:00

Malaysia	2−1	Timor-Leste
Shahrul 13'; Jafri 51'	Report	Soares 20'

Laos National Stadium, Vientiane
Referee: Xaypaseuth Phongsanit (Laos)

25 August 2015
16:00

Timor-Leste	0–2	Vietnam
	Report	Lâm Thuận 27'; Nguyễn Tiến Linh 89'

Laos National Stadium, Vientiane
Referee: Chanketya Thong (Cambodia)
25 August 2015
19:00

Malaysia	4–0	Singapore
Jafri 15', 21'; Nazirul 64'; Danial 88'	Report

Laos National Stadium, Vientiane
Referee: Hadimin Shahbuddin (Brunei)

27 August 2015
16:00

Myanmar	1–1	Timor-Leste
Aung Zin Phyo 90+2'	Report	Gelvanio 1'

Laos National Stadium, Vientiane
Referee: Xaypaseuth Phongsanit (Laos)
27 August 2015
19:00

Vietnam	0–0	Malaysia
	Report

Laos National Stadium, Vientiane
Referee: Hadimin Shahbuddin (Brunei)

29 August 2015
16:00

Singapore	0–6	Vietnam
	Report	Hà Đức Chinh 18' (pen.); Hồ Minh Dĩ 32'; Nguyễn Tiến Linh 45+1', 90+2'; Phạm Trọng Hoá 64'; Trương Tiến Anh 79'

Laos National Stadium, Vientiane
Referee: Xaypaseuth Phongsanit (Laos)
29 August 2015
19:00

Malaysia	0–1	Myanmar
	Report	Kyaw Ko Ko Oo 50'

Laos National Stadium, Vientiane
Referee: Ahmed Sifan Abdul Raheem (Maldives)

31 August 2015
16:00

Timor-Leste	1–1	Singapore
Oliveira 6'	Report	Pashia 90+1'

Laos National Stadium, Vientiane
Referee: Chanketya Thong (Cambodia)
31 August 2015
19:00

Myanmar	0–2	Vietnam
	Report	Trần Duy Khánh 41'; Phạm Trọng Hoá 78'

Laos National Stadium, Vientiane
Referee: Hadimin Shahbuddin (Brunei)

== Knockout stage ==
Semi-finals
2 September – Vientiane
Thailand	5
Malaysia	0
2 September – Vientiane
Vietnam	4
Laos	0

Final
4 September – Vientiane
Thailand	6
Vietnam	0
Third place match
4 September – Vientiane
Malaysia	1 (2)
Laos (p)	1 (3)

=== Semi-finals ===
2 September 2015
16:00

Thailand	5–0	Malaysia
Ritthidet 34', 46'; Worachit 42'; Sansern 45+1'; Suksan 71'	Report

Laos National Stadium, Vientiane
Referee: Hadimin Shahbuddin (Brunei)
2 September 2015
19:00

Vietnam	4–0	Laos
Hồ Minh Dĩ 2'; Hà Đức Chinh 51', 58', 83'	Report

Laos National Stadium, Vientiane
Referee: Ahmed Sifan Abdul Raheem (Maldives)

=== Third place match ===
4 September 2015
16:00

Malaysia	1–1 (a.e.t.)	Laos
Syamer 90+4'	Report	Phommathep 84'
Penalties
Syamer (penalty scored); Rizalul (penalty missed); Kogileswaran (penalty missed); Shahrul (penalty scored); Thipanraj (penalty missed)	2–3	(penalty missed) Phanvongsa; (penalty scored) Pathammavong; (penalty scored) Phaphardy; (penalty scored) Sihalath

Laos National Stadium, Vientiane
Referee: Steve Supresencia (Philippines)

=== Final ===
4 September 2015
19:00

Thailand	6–0	Vietnam
Worachit 44', 83'; Suksan 57'; Ritthidet 69'; Anon 88' (pen.), 90'	Report

Laos National Stadium, Vientiane
Referee: Shuhaizi Shukri (Malaysia)

== Winners ==
AFF U-19 Youth Championship 2015 winners

Thailand
Fourth title

== Goalscorers ==
6 goals

- (Thailand) Worachit Kanitsribampen

4 goals

- (Thailand) Suksan Mungpao
- (Thailand) Ritthidet Phensawat
- (Vietnam) Hà Đức Chinh

3 goals

- (Laos) Sinthanong Phanvongsa
- (Malaysia) Mohd Jafri Firdaus Chew
- (Thailand) Jakkit Wachpirom
- (Thailand) Sansern Limwatthana
- (Thailand) Supachai Jaided
- (Vietnam) Nguyễn Tiến Linh

2 goals

- (Cambodia) Sath Rosib
- (Laos) Piyaphong Pathammavong
- (Philippines) Mathew Custodio
- (Philippines) Mark Winhoffer
- (Thailand) Anon Amornlerdsak
- (Thailand) Wisarut Imura
- (Vietnam) Hồ Minh Dĩ
- (Vietnam) Phạm Trọng Hoá

1 goal

- (Brunei) Mohd Abdul Mateen
- (Brunei) Mohd Akif Roslan
- (Cambodia) Chin Vannak
- (Cambodia) Chreng Polroth
- (Cambodia) Son Vandeth
- (Cambodia) Touch Roma
- (Laos) Sayfa Aphideth
- (Laos) Somxay Keohanam
- (Laos) Souksavanh Xayalin
- (Laos) Phathana Phommathep
- (Malaysia) Mohd Danial Ashraf
- (Malaysia) Mohd Nazirul Afif
- (Malaysia) Mohd Shahrul Akmal
- (Malaysia) Thipanraj Subramaniam
- (Malaysia) Syamer Kutty Abba
- (Myanmar) Aung Zin Phyo
- (Myanmar) Kaung Chit Naing
- (Myanmar) Kyaw Ko Ko Oo
- (Singapore) Mohd Haiqal Anugrah
- (Thailand) Phattharaphon Jansuwan
- (Timor-Leste) Ervino Soares
- (Timor-Leste) Gelvanio Alberto
- (Timor-Leste) José Oliveira
- (Vietnam) Lâm Thuận
- (Vietnam) Trần Duy Khánh
- (Vietnam) Trương Tiến Anh

Own goals

- (Brunei) Mohd Rahimin Abdul Ghani (playing against Thailand)
- (Philippines) Mar Diano (playing against Laos)
