= 2016 AFF U-19 Youth Championship =

Giải vô địch bóng đá U-19 Đông Nam Á 2016

Tournament details
- Host country: Vietnam
- City: Hanoi
- Dates: 11–24 September
- Teams: 11 (from 1 sub-confederation)
- Venue: 2 (in 1 host city)

Final positions
- Champions: Australia (4th title)
- Runners-up: Thailand
- Third place: Vietnam
- Fourth place: Timor-Leste

Tournament statistics
- Matches played: 29
- Goals scored: 118 (4.07 per match)
- Top scorer: (Australia) George Blackwood (6 goals)

The 2016 AFF U-19 Youth Championship was the 14th edition of the AFF U-19 Youth Championship, organised by the ASEAN Football Federation, and known for sponsorship reasons as the AFF Vietcombank U19 Championship. It was hosted by Vietnam for the sixth time after the 2007, 2009, 2010, 2012 and 2014 editions. It was played from 11 to 24 September 2016. Eleven out of the twelve member associations of the ASEAN Football Federation took part in the tournament featuring two groups of five and six teams.

== Venues ==
Hanoi
Vietnam Youth Training Centre	Location of stadiums of the 2016 AFF U-19 Youth Championship.	Hàng Đẫy Stadium
Capacity: 1,000	Location of stadiums of the 2016 AFF U-19 Youth Championship.	Capacity: 22,500

== Participating teams ==
- Australia
- Thailand
- Vietnam
- Myanmar
- Timor-Leste
- Malaysia
- Indonesia
- Laos
- Cambodia
- Philippines
- Singapore

== Group stage ==
- All matches were held in Hanoi, Vietnam.
- All times are local, ICT (UTC+7).

=== Group A ===
Pos	Team	Pld	W	D	L	GF	GA	GD	Pts	Qualification
1	Vietnam (H)	4	3	1	0	11	5	+6	10	Knockout stage
2	Timor-Leste	4	3	0	1	8	7	+1	9	Knockout stage
3	Malaysia	4	2	0	2	10	7	+3	6	
4	Singapore	4	1	1	2	3	5	−2	4	
5	Philippines	4	0	0	4	5	13	−8	0	

Source: AFF
(H) Hosts
11 September 2016
16:00

Philippines	1–2	Timor-Leste
Jarvis 75'	Report	Monteiro 10'; Henrique Cruz 37'

Hàng Đẫy Stadium, Hanoi
Referee: Thoriq Al Katiri (Indonesia)
11 September 2016
19:00

Singapore	0–0	Vietnam
	Report

Hàng Đẫy Stadium, Hanoi
Attendance: 2,200
Referee: Mongkolchai Pechsri (Thailand)

13 September 2016
16:00

Philippines	0–5	Malaysia
	Report	M. Kamarudin 38'; M. Jafri 41'; M. Amirul 70' (pen.); Syamer 79'; Rusalan 90'

Hàng Đẫy Stadium, Hanoi
Referee: Xaypaseuth Phongsanit (Laos)
13 September 2016
19:00

Timor-Leste	1–4	Vietnam
Gama 90'	Report	Huỳnh Tấn Sinh 13'; Nguyễn Tiến Linh 27'; Tống Anh Tỷ 80', 90+4'

Hàng Đẫy Stadium, Hanoi
Attendance: 653
Referee: Warintorn Sassadee (Thailand)

15 September 2016
16:00

Malaysia	2–1	Singapore
Zarulizwan 16'; M. Jafri 45+1'	Report	Syahrul 82'

Hàng Đẫy Stadium, Hanoi
15 September 2016
19:00

Vietnam	4–3	Philippines
Hà Đức Chinh 10' (pen.), 62'; Trương Tiến Anh 28'; Trần Thành 61' (pen.)	Report	Winhoffer 19'; Miyagi 25'; Ebarle 90'

Hàng Đẫy Stadium, Hanoi
Referee: Khin Maung Win (Myanmar)

17 September 2016
16:00

Timor-Leste	3–2	Malaysia
F. Alves 32', 36'; G. Alberto 71'	Report	M. Jafri 45'; Danial 57'

Vietnam Youth Training Centre, Hanoi
Attendance: 200
Referee: Thoriq Al Katiri (Indonesia)
17 September 2016
19:00

Philippines	1–2	Singapore
Borlongan 16'	Report	Pereira 17'; Haiqal 23'

Vietnam Youth Training Centre, Hanoi
Attendance: 200
Referee: Xaypaseuth Phongsanit (Laos)

19 September 2016
19:00

Singapore	0–2	Timor-Leste
	Report	Gama 5'; Oliveira 89'

Vietnam Youth Training Centre, Hanoi
Attendance: 52
Referee: Warintorn Sassadee (Thailand)
19 September 2016
19:00

Malaysia	1–3	Vietnam
M. Jafri 90'	Report	Trần Duy Khánh 13'; Đoàn Văn Hậu 81'; Nguyễn Tiến Linh 90'

Hàng Đẫy Stadium, Hanoi
Attendance: 550
Referee: Khin Maung Win (Myanmar)

=== Group B ===
Pos	Team	Pld	W	D	L	GF	GA	GD	Pts	Qualification
1	Thailand	5	4	1	0	13	6	+7	13	Knockout stage
2	Australia	5	4	0	1	11	7	+4	12	Knockout stage
3	Myanmar	5	2	2	1	11	10	+1	8	
4	Indonesia	5	2	0	3	12	13	−1	6	
5	Cambodia	5	1	0	4	7	11	−4	3	
6	Laos	5	0	1	4	7	14	−7	1	

Source: AFF
12 September 2016
16:00

Thailand	2–1	Laos
Worachit 26'; Supachai 60'	Report	Maitee 43'

Hàng Đẫy Stadium, Hanoi
Attendance: 1,100
Referee: Steve Supresencia (Philippines)
12 September 2016
16:00

Myanmar	3–2	Indonesia
Aung Kaung Mann 11'; Zwee Thet Paing 27'; Shwe Ko 55'	Report	Pandi 17'; Sandi 44'

Vietnam Youth Training Centre, Hanoi
Referee: Muhammad Nazmi Nasaruddin (Malaysia)
12 September 2016
19:00

Australia	2–0	Cambodia
Cheng Meng 64' (o.g.); Blackwood 66' (pen.)	Report

Vietnam Youth Training Centre, Hanoi
Referee: Chen Hsin-chuan (Chinese Taipei)

14 September 2016
16:00

Myanmar	0–3	Australia
	Report	Pandurevic 18', 28'; Scott 83'

Hàng Đẫy Stadium, Hanoi
Referee: Muhammad Nazmi Nasaruddin (Malaysia)
14 September 2016
16:00

Cambodia	3–0	Laos
Sep Rosib 41'; Long Phearath 86'; Kunthea Ravan 90+2'	Report

Vietnam Youth Training Centre, Hanoi
Referee: Hoàng Anh Tuấn (Vietnam)
14 September 2016
19:00

Indonesia	2–3	Thailand
Dimas 16' (pen.), 18' (pen.)	Report	Sittichok 34', 46'; Worachit 54'

Vietnam Youth Training Centre, Hanoi
Referee: Hadimin Shahbuddin (Brunei)

16 September 2016
16:00

Indonesia	1–3	Australia
Bagas Adi 35' (pen.)	Report	Prasad 22'; Scott 72'; Shabow 88'

Vietnam Youth Training Centre, Hanoi
16 September 2016
16:00

Thailand	2–1	Cambodia
Jakkit 28'; Worachit 30'	Report	Saringkan 8' (o.g.)

Hàng Đẫy Stadium, Hanoi
Attendance: 350
Referee: Steve Supresencia (Philippines)
16 September 2016
19:00

Laos	4–4	Myanmar
Maitee 8', 54', 57'; Khamphanh 90'	Report	Shwe Ko 21', 29'; Aung Kaung Mann 23', 45'

Hàng Đẫy Stadium, Hanoi
Attendance: 250
Referee: Hadimin Shahbuddin (Brunei)

18 September 2016
15:30

Cambodia	0–3	Myanmar
	Report	Ouk Sovann 21' (o.g.); Zwe Thet Paing 30'; Aung Naing Win 49'

Vietnam Youth Training Centre, Hanoi
Attendance: 50
Referee: Hadimin Shahbuddin (Brunei)
18 September 2016
16:00

Laos	1–3	Indonesia
Vanna 25'	Report	Pandi 21'; Saddil 43'; M. Rafli 84'

Vietnam Youth Training Centre, Hanoi
Attendance: 150
Referee: Hoàng Anh Tuấn (Vietnam)
18 September 2016
19:00

Australia	1–5	Thailand
Blackwood 14'	Report	Sorawit 18'; Supachai 42', 57', 80'; Worachit 90+2'

Vietnam Youth Training Centre, Hanoi
Attendance: 354
Referee: Muhammad Nazmi Nasaruddin (Malaysia)

20 September 2016
16:00

Thailand	1–1	Myanmar
Supachai 58'	Report	Ariyapol 9' (o.g.)

Hàng Đẫy Stadium, Hanoi
Attendance: 200
Referee: Chen Hsin-chuan (Chinese Taipei)
20 September 2016
16:00

Laos	1–2	Australia
Santi 45'	Report	Scott 73'; Blackwood 85' (pen.)

Vietnam Youth Training Centre, Hanoi
Attendance: 150
Referee: Steve Supresencia (Philippines)
20 September 2016
19:00

Indonesia	4–3	Cambodia
Rafli 30'; Saddil 32', 57', 90'	Report	Sodavid 7'; Safy 67'; Phearath 77' (pen.)

Vietnam Youth Training Centre, Hanoi
Attendance: 250
Referee: Hoàng Anh Tuấn (Vietnam)

== Knockout stage ==
Semi-finals
22 September – Hanoi
Vietnam	2
Australia	5
22 September – Hanoi
Thailand	2
Timor-Leste	1

Final
24 September – Hanoi
Australia	5
Thailand	1
Third place match
24 September – Hanoi
Vietnam	4
Timor-Leste	0

=== Semi-finals ===
22 September 2016
16:00

Thailand	2–1	Timor-Leste
Wisarut 80'; Suksan 90+3'	Report	Gama 85'

Hàng Đẫy Stadium, Hanoi
Attendance: 200
Referee: Hadimin Shahbuddin (Brunei)
22 September 2016
19:00

Vietnam	2–5	Australia
Hồ Minh Dĩ 58'; Hà Đức Chinh 68' (pen.)	Report	Blackwood 23', 53'; Shabow 26', 35'; Champness 84'

Hàng Đẫy Stadium, Hanoi
Attendance: 2,544
Referee: Chen Hsin-Chuan (Chinese Taipei)

=== Third place match ===
24 September 2016
16:00

Vietnam	4–0	Timor-Leste
Trần Thành 24'; Hà Đức Chinh 28'; Phan Thanh Hậu 45'; Lê Ngọc Bảo 89'	Report

Hàng Đẫy Stadium, Hanoi
Attendance: 550
Referee: Xaypaseuth Phongsanit (Laos)

=== Final ===
24 September 2016
19:00

Australia	5–1	Thailand
Baccus 10'; Kuzmanovski 19', 73'; Blackwood 67'; Champness 70'	Report	Jakkit 89'

Hàng Đẫy Stadium, Hanoi
Attendance: 1,501
Referee: Muhammad Nazmi Nasaruddin (Malaysia)

== Winner ==
2016 AFF U-19 Youth Championship Winners
(Australia)
Australia
4th title

== Goalscorers ==
6 goals

- (Australia) George Blackwood

5 goals

- (Thailand) Supachai Jaided

4 goals

- (Laos) Maitee Hatsady
- (Malaysia) Muhammad Jafri
- (Thailand) Worachit Kanitsribampen
- (Indonesia) Saddil Ramdani

3 goals

- (Australia) Lachlan Scott
- (Australia) Mario Shabow
- (Cambodia) Long Phearath
- (Myanmar) Aung Kaung Mann
- (Myanmar) Shwe Ko
- (Timor-Leste) Rufino Gama
- (Vietnam) Hà Đức Chinh

2 goals

- (Australia) Joe Champness
- (Australia) Steve Kuzmanovski
- (Australia) Dejan Pandurevic
- (Indonesia) Dimas Drajad
- (Indonesia) Pandi Lestaluhu
- (Myanmar) Zwee Thet Paing
- (Thailand) Jakkit Wachpirom
- (Thailand) Sittichok Paso
- (Timor-Leste) Frangcyatma Alves
- (Vietnam) Tống Anh Tỷ
- (Vietnam) Nguyễn Tiến Linh
- (Vietnam) Trần Thành

1 goal

- (Australia) Keanu Baccus
- (Australia) Jayden Prasad
- (Cambodia) In Sodavid
- (Cambodia) Kunthea Ravan
- (Cambodia) Sep Rosib
- (Cambodia) Yue Safy
- (Indonesia) Bagas Adi Nugroho
- (Indonesia) Sandi Pratama
- (Indonesia) Muhammad Rafli
- (Laos) Khamphanh Sonthanalay
- (Laos) Santi Somphoupeth
- (Laos) Vanna Bounlovongsa
- (Malaysia) Syamer Kutty Abba
- (Malaysia) Muhammad Amirul
- (Malaysia) Muhammad Kamarudin
- (Malaysia) Mohd Zarulizwan Mazlan
- (Malaysia) Badrul Rusalan
- (Malaysia) Danial Ashraf
- (Myanmar) Aung Naing Win
- (Philippines) Jeremiah Borlongan
- (Philippines) Major Ebarle
- (Philippines) Jordan Jarvis
- (Philippines) Kintaro Miyagi
- (Philippines) Mark Winhoffer
- (Singapore) Syahrul Sazali
- (Singapore) Haiqal Pashia
- (Thailand) Sorawit Panthong
- (Thailand) Wisarut Imura
- (Thailand) Suksan Mungpao
- (Timor-Leste) Henrique Cruz
- (Timor-Leste) Gaudencio Monteiro
- (Timor-Leste) Gelvanio Alberto
- (Timor-Leste) José Oliveira
- (Vietnam) Trương Tiến Anh
- (Vietnam) Lê Ngọc Bảo
- (Vietnam) Trần Duy Khánh
- (Vietnam) Đoàn Văn Hậu
- (Vietnam) Phan Thanh Hậu
- (Vietnam) Huỳnh Tấn Sinh

Own goals

- (Cambodia) Cheng Meng (playing against Australia)
- (Cambodia) Ouk Sovann (playing against Myanmar)
- (Thailand) Ariyapol Chanson (playing against Myanmar)
- (Thailand) Saringkan Promsupa (playing against Cambodia)
