= Tống Anh Tỷ =

Vietnamese footballer

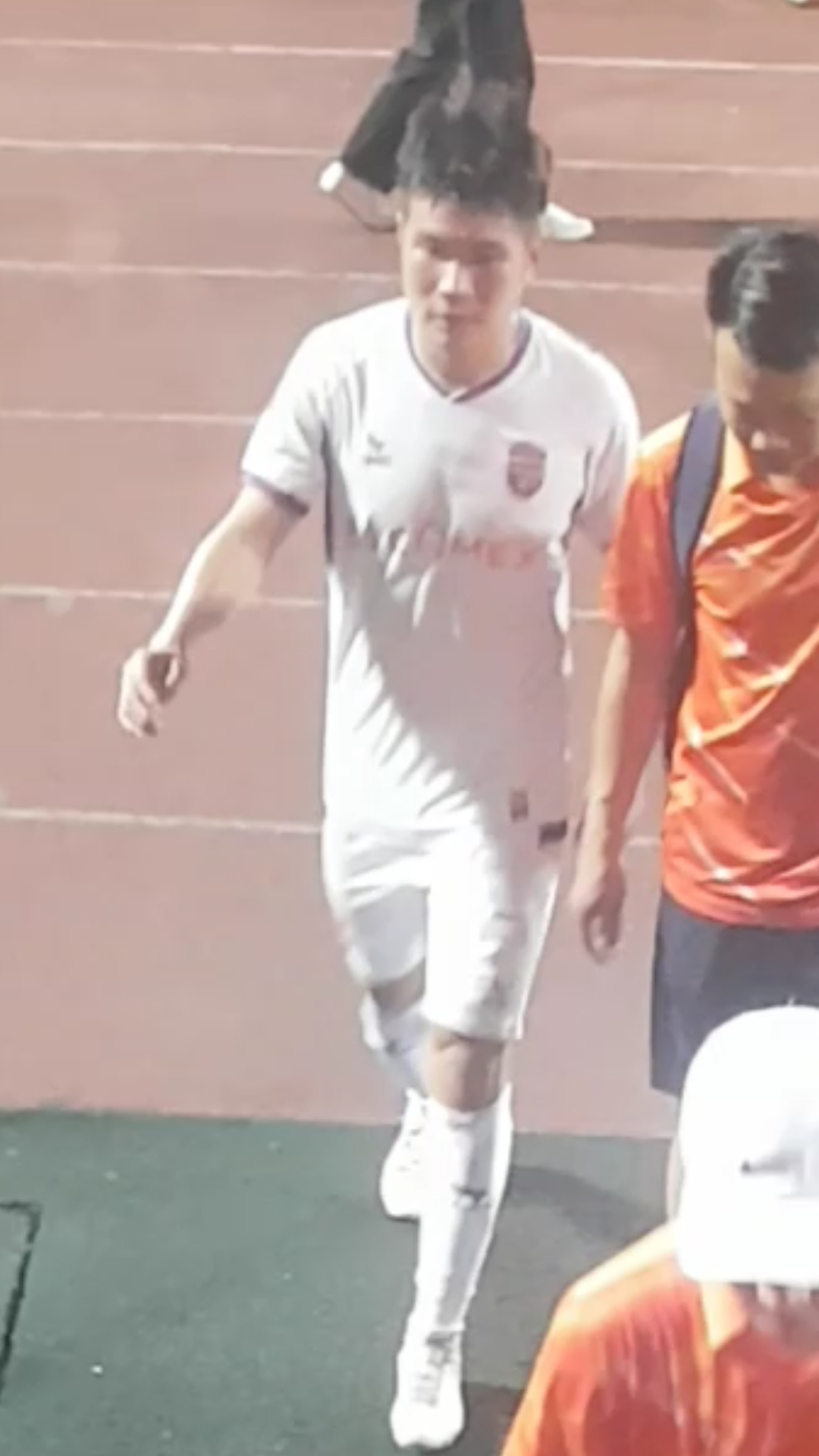
- Anh Tỷ in 2024

Personal information
- Full name: Tống Anh Tỷ
- Date of birth: 24 January 1997 (age 29)
- Place of birth: Thuận An, Bình Dương, Vietnam
- Height: 1.72 m (5 ft 8 in)
- Position: Central midfielder

Team information
- Current team: Becamex Bình Dương
- Number: 6

Youth career
- 2008–2015: Becamex Bình Dương

Senior career*
Years	Team	Apps	(Gls)
2016–	Becamex Bình Dương	83	(3)

International career
2016–2017	Vietnam U19	2	(0)
- * Club domestic league appearances and goals as of 6 January 2022

Tống Anh Tỷ (born 24 January 1997) is a Vietnamese footballer who plays as a central midfielder for Becamex Bình Dương.

== Honours ==
Becamex Bình Dương

- Vietnamese National Cup: Runner-up 2017
- Vietnamese Super Cup: 2016; Runner-up 2019
