= 2018 Alpine Cup =

Tournament details
- Host country: Myanmar
- Dates: 1–5 August
- Teams: 4 (from 1 confederation)
- Venue: 1 (in 1 host city)

Final positions
- Champions: South Korea (1st title)
- Runners-up: Myanmar
- Third place: Bahrain
- Fourth place: Thailand

Tournament statistics
- Matches played: 6
- Goals scored: 26 (4.33 per match)
- Top scorer(s): (South Korea) Um Wonsang (3 goals)

The 2018 Alpine Cup is a four-nation football tournament hosted in Mandalay, Myanmar from 1–5 August 2018. The tournament is sponsored by Alpine purified drinking water. Myanmar, Thailand, and Bahrain compete as U-23 national teams while South Korea does as U-19 national team.

== Venues ==
Mandalay
Mandalarthiri Stadium
21°56′36.8″N 96°5′55.5″E
Capacity: 30,000
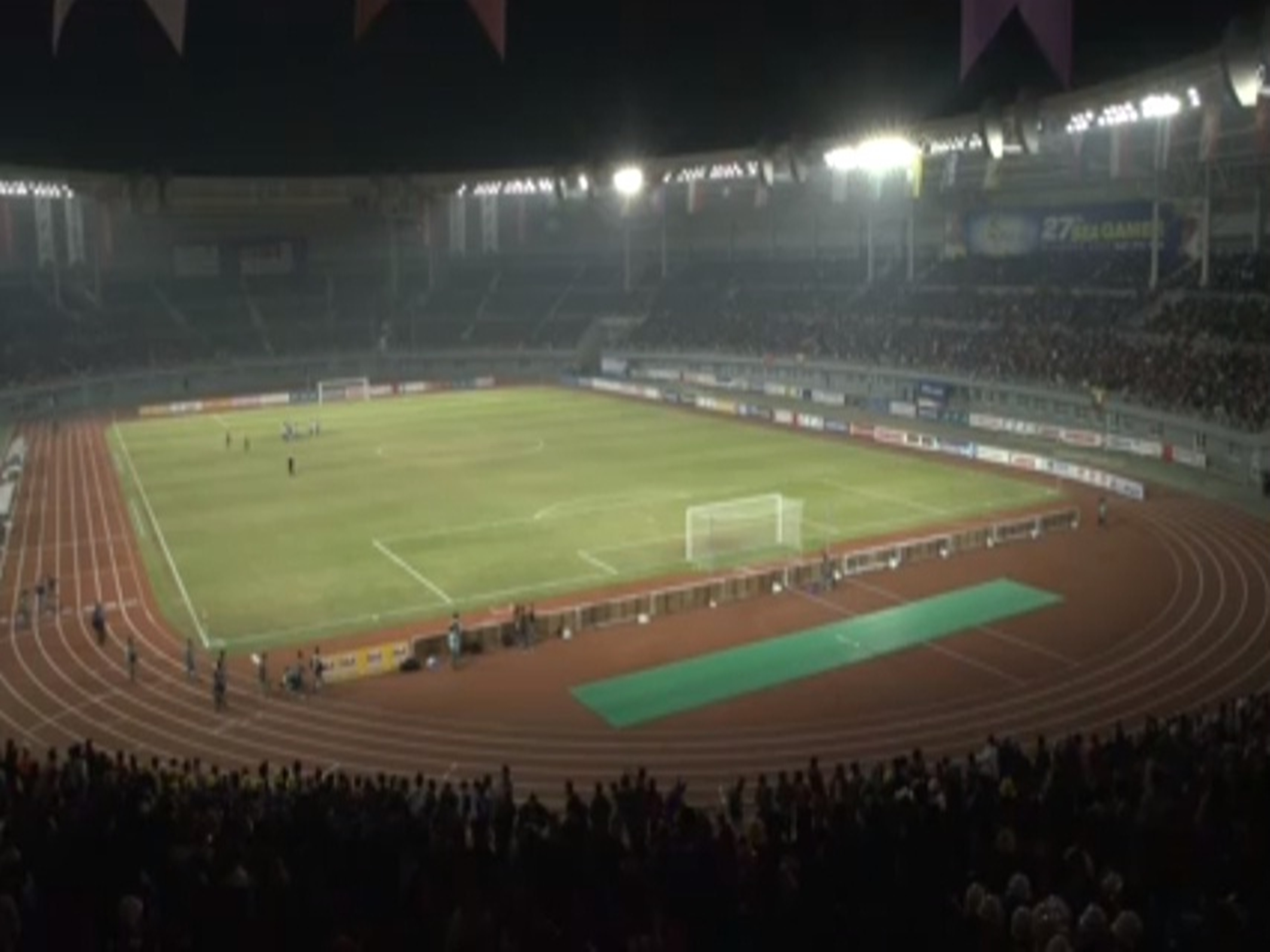

== Standings ==
Pos	Team	Pld	W	D	L	GF	GA	GD	Pts
1	South Korea	3	3	0	0	10	6	+4	9
2	Myanmar (H)	3	1	1	1	6	6	0	4
3	Bahrain	3	1	1	1	5	5	0	4
4	Thailand	3	0	0	3	5	9	−4	0

Updated to match(es) played on 5 August 2018. Source: Myanmar Football Federation
Rules for classification: 1) Points; 2) Goal difference; 3) Goals scored; 4) Head-to-head; 5) Fair-play points; 6) Penalty shoot-out
(H) Hosts

== Matches ==
All times are local, Myanmar Time (UTC+6:30)

1 August 2018
15:00

Bahrain	3–2	Thailand
Abdula 15'; Mubarak 41'; Saleh 63'		Jaroensak 4'; Jakkit (pen.), 8'

Mandalarthiri Stadium, Mandalay
Referee: Myat Thu (Myanmar)
1 August 2018
18:00

Myanmar	3–4	South Korea
Dway Ko Ko Chit 75'; Myat Kaung Khant 85'; Yan Naing Oo 90+1'		Choe Heewon 5'; Choi Jun 22', 58'; Kim Seyun 32'

Mandalarthiri Stadium, Mandalay
Referee: Lim Bunthoeun (Cambodia)

3 August 2018
15:00

Thailand	2–4	South Korea
Suttisak 49', 51'		Lim Jaehyuk 28', 56'; Um Wonsang 44', 71'

Mandalarthiri Stadium, Mandalay
Referee: Myat Thu (Myanmar)
3 August 2018
18:00

Bahrain	1–1	Myanmar
Abdula 12'		Yan Naing Oo 20'

Mandalarthiri Stadium, Mandalay
Referee: Lim Bunthoeun (Cambodia)

5 August 2018
15:00

South Korea	2–1	Bahrain
Um Wonsang 50'; Kim Janhyun 90+4'		Hasan Jaafar 72'

Mandalarthiri Stadium, Mandalay
Referee: Myat Thu (Myanmar)
5 August 2018
18:00

Myanmar	2–1	Thailand
Aung Thu 1'; Zaw Min Tun 5'		Ratchanat 30'

Mandalarthiri Stadium, Mandalay
Attendance: 29000
Referee: Lim Bunthoeun (Cambodia)

2018 Alpine Cup

South Korea U-19
First title

== Goalscorers ==
3 goals

- (South Korea) Um Wonsang

2 goals

- (Bahrain) Abdula
- (South Korea) Choi Jun
- (South Korea) Lim Jaehyuk
- (Myanmar) Yan Naing Oo
- (Thailand) Suttisak

1 goal

- (Bahrain) Mubarak
- (Bahrain) Saleh
- (Bahrain) Hasan Jaafar
- (South Korea) Choe Heewon
- (South Korea) Kim Janhyun
- (South Korea) Kim Seyun
- (Myanmar) Aung Thu
- (Myanmar) Dway Ko Ko Chit
- (Myanmar) Myat Kaung Khant
- (Myanmar) Zaw Min Tun
- (Thailand) Jakkit
- (Thailand) Jaroensak
- (Thailand) Ratchanat

== Prize money ==
Position	Amount (thousand USD)	
Position	Per team	Total
Champions	$10,000	10
Runner-up	$5,000	5
Total		15
