= Danko Kovačević =

Montenegrin footballer

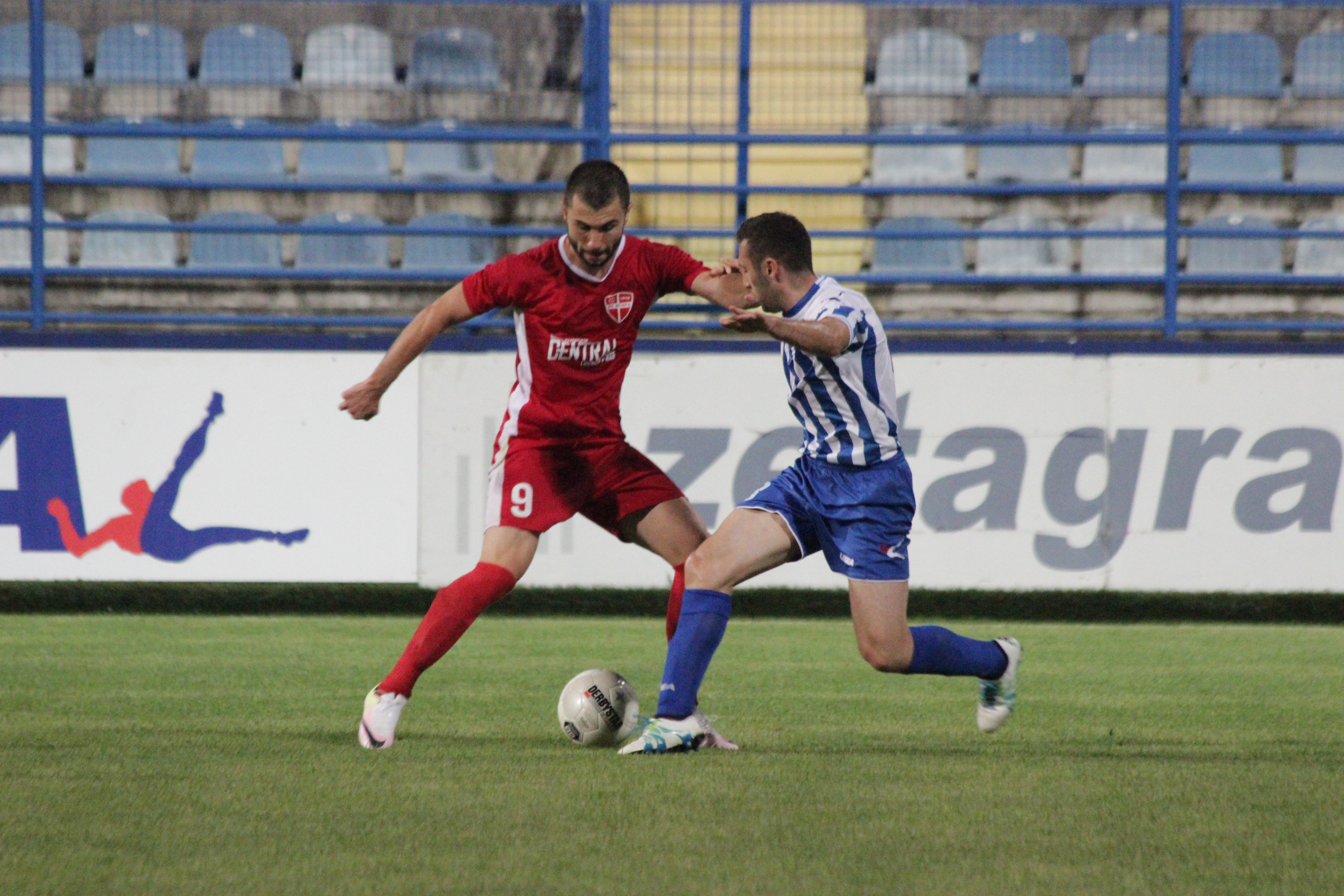
- Kovačević (left) at Buducnost v. Iskra (6 August 2016)

Personal information
- Date of birth: 10 July 1991 (age 35)
- Place of birth: Cetinje, SFR Yugoslavia
- Height: 1.85 m (6 ft 1 in)
- Position: Striker

Youth career
- 2007–2009: Red Star Belgrade
- 2009–2010: Čukarički

Senior career*
Years	Team	Apps	(Gls)
2010–2011	Čukarički	13	(3)
2011–2012	Doxa Drama	5	(1)
2012	Kaposvár Rákóczi	0	(0)
2012	Kaposvár Rákóczi II	5	(0)
2013	Lovćen	1	(0)
2013	BSK Borča	2	(0)
2014	Čelik Nikšić	8	(1)
2014	Bežanija	13	(0)
2015	Stal Stalowa Wola	4	(0)
2015–2017	Iskra	43	(9)
2017	Sông Lam Nghe An	9	(1)
2018	Grbalj	6	(2)
2019	Iskra	3	(0)
2019–2020	Selangor United		

International career
2009–2012	Montenegro U19	5	(1)
- * Club domestic league appearances and goals

Danko Kovačević (Montenegrin: Данко Ковачевић, born 10 July 1991) is a Montenegrin former professional footballer who played as a striker.

== Club career ==
Born in Cetinje, he started playing in the youth team of Red Star Belgrade, before moving to FK Čukarički, having played with them in the 2010–11 Serbian SuperLiga. Then, he moved to Doxa Drama and played in the 2011–12 Super League Greece. In the summer of 2012, he moved to Hungary to join Kaposvári Rákóczi. He was part of the matchday squad in the 2012–13 Nemzeti Bajnokság I on five occasions but never made an appearance, and spent most of the time in the second team of Kaposvar playing in the second division.

During the winter break, he moved to his native Montenegro and played the rest of the season with FK Lovćen, although got only one appearance in the 2012–13 Montenegrin First League. In the summer of 2013, he returned to Serbia and signed with FK BSK Borča who had just been relegated from the Serbian SuperLiga. In 2015, he joined Polish II liga club Stal Stalowa Wola, before moving to Iskar. In 2017, he moved to Vietnamese club Sông Lam Nghe An, with whom he won the 2017 Vietnamese Cup.

In early 2018, he moved back to Montenegro to join Grbalj.

In May 2019, Kovačević joined Selangor United.

== International career ==
Kocačević was a part of the Montenegro under-19 team.

== Honours ==
Sông Lam Nghe An

- Vietnamese Cup: 2017
