= Touch Roma =

Cambodian footballer

Touch Roma ទូច រ៉ូម៉ា
Personal information
- Full name: Touch Roma
- Date of birth: May 1, 1993 (age 33)
- Place of birth: Bavet, Svay Rieng, Cambodia
- Position: Forward

Senior career*
Years	Team	Apps	(Gls)
2013–2020	National Defense Ministry		
2017	→ Western Phnom Penh (loan)		

International career^{‡}
2015	Cambodia U-19	4	(1)
2015	Cambodia	2	(0)
- * Club domestic league appearances and goals ‡ National team caps and goals as of 11 January 2016

Touch Roma (born 1 May 1993) is a Cambodian footballer who plays for National Defense Ministry in the Cambodian League and the Cambodia national team. He made his national debut at the age of 16 on 3 November 2015 in a friendly match against Brunei. He has also played for Cambodia at various youth levels.

== Honours ==
=== Club ===
National Defense Ministry

- Hun Sen Cup: 2016
