= Pandi Lestaluhu =

Indonesian association footballer

Personal information
- Full name: Pandi Ahmad Lestaluhu
- Date of birth: 7 August 1997 (age 29)
- Place of birth: Tulehu, Indonesia
- Height: 1.68 m (5 ft 6 in)
- Position: Winger

Senior career*
Years	Team	Apps	(Gls)
2015–2016	Persija Jakarta	0	(0)
2016–2017	PS TNI	21	(2)
2017	Persija Jakarta	10	(0)
2018–2019	PS TIRA	4	(0)
2019–2020	Kalteng Putra	21	(1)
2020–2021	Arema	0	(0)
2020	→ Mitra Kukar (loan)	1	(2)
2021	Mitra Kukar	8	(0)
2022	Semen Padang	5	(0)
2023–2025	Nusantara Lampung	20	(5)

International career^{‡}
2016	Indonesia U19	5	(2)
- * Club domestic league appearances and goals as of 10 February 2025 ‡ National team caps and goals as of 20 September 2016

Pandi Ahmad Lestaluhu (born 7 August 1997) is an Indonesian professional footballer who plays as a winger.

== International career ==
In 2016, Pandi represented the Indonesia U-19, in the 2016 AFF U-19 Youth Championship. And on 12 September 2016, in a match AFF U-19 Youth Championship against Myanmar U-19, Pandi made his first international goal.

== Personal life ==
Lestaluhu is one of many siblings, his older brothers Ramdani Lestaluhu, Abduh Lestaluhu, and Rafid Lestaluhu who are also professional footballers, with the first two being former teammates of his at Persija Jakarta.
