= Nguyễn Trọng Huy =

Vietnamese footballer

Personal information
- Full name: Nguyễn Trọng Huy
- Date of birth: 25 June 1997 (age 29)
- Place of birth: Dầu Tiếng, Bình Dương, Vietnam
- Height: 1.79 m (5 ft 10 in)
- Position: Central midfielder

Team information
- Current team: Becamex Bình Dương
- Number: 26

Youth career
- 2009–2015: Becamex Bình Dương

Senior career*
Years	Team	Apps	(Gls)
2016–	Becamex Bình Dương	75	(1)

International career
2015–2016	Vietnam U19	5	(0)
2017–2018	Vietnam U21	3	(0)
- * Club domestic league appearances and goals as of 22 June 2025

Nguyễn Trọng Huy (born 25 June 1997) is a Vietnamese footballer who plays as a central midfielder for V.League 1 club Becamex Bình Dương.

== Honours ==
Becamex Bình Dương

- Vietnamese National Cup: 2018; Runner-up 2017
- Vietnamese Super Cup: 2016; Runner-up 2019

Vietnam U21

- International U-21 Thanh Niên Newspaper Cup: Runner-up 2017
