= Roeurm Channroeurn =

Cambodian footballer

Roeurm Channroeurn រឿម ចាន់រឿន
Personal information
- Date of birth: May 15, 1996 (age 30)
- Place of birth: Cambodia
- Height: 1.70 m (5 ft 7 in)
- Position: Defender

Senior career*
Years	Team	Apps	(Gls)
2005–2022	National Defense Ministry		

International career^{‡}
2015	Cambodia U-19	5	(0)
2015	Cambodia	1	(0)
- * Club domestic league appearances and goals ‡ National team caps and goals as of 3 November 2015

Roeurm Channroeurn (born 15 May 1996) is a Cambodian footballer who plays for National Defense Ministry in the Cambodian League and the Cambodia national team. He made his national debut at the age of 18 on 3 November 2015 in a friendly match against Brunei.

== Honours ==
=== Club ===
National Defense Ministry

- Hun Sen Cup: 2016
