= Mario Shabow =

Australian soccer player (born 1998)

Personal information
- Full name: Mario Shabow
- Date of birth: 5 May 1998 (age 28)
- Place of birth: Baghdad, Iraq
- Height: 1.67 m (5 ft 6 in)
- Position: Attacking midfielder

Team information
- Current team: Bankstown City Lions

Youth career
- Marconi Stallions
- Blacktown City
- 2014–2017: Western Sydney Wanderers

Senior career*
| Years | Team | Apps | (Gls) |
| 2015–2017 | Western Sydney Wanderers | 2 | (0) |
| 2016–2017 | Western Sydney Wanderers NPL | 21 | (7) |
| 2017–2018 | Newcastle Jets | 7 | (0) |
| 2018 | Newcastle Jets NPL | 2 | (1) |
| 2018–2020 | Central Coast Mariners | 11 | (1) |
| 2019 | CCM Academy | 2 | (0) |
| 2020–2024 | Blacktown City | 73 | (10) |
| 2025 | Sydney United 58 | 25 | (2) |
| 2026– | Bankstown City Lions | 6 | (1) |

International career^{‡}
| 2015–2018 | Australia U20 | 13 | (5) |
Medal record
Men's football
Representing Australia
AFF U-19 Youth Championship
| First place | 2016 Vietnam | U-20 Team |
- * Club domestic league appearances and goals as of 14 March 2026 ‡ National team caps and goals as of 3 December 2018

Mario Shabow (born 5 May 1998) is a professional football player. He currently plays for Bankstown City Lions. Born in Iraq, he has represented Australia at youth level.

== Early life ==
Shabow was born in Baghdad, Iraq. At the age of six, his family moved to Australia in 2004, due to the unsettled war-torn country. Shabow who is of Assyrian ethnicity, attended Hoxton Park High School and played for the juniors Liverpool Olympic local soccer club.

Growing up in the suburbs of Western sydney, Shabow was also playing for the premier league Sydney City Eagles Futsal (football) club. He was chosen to represent NSW in the indoor Futsal National championships.

He gained more experience playing for the Marconi Stallions and Blacktown City FC and attracted attention from various A-league clubs through competing in the NSW National Premier League.

== Club career ==
=== Western Sydney Wanderers ===
While playing for Blacktown City in 2014, Shabow was called up for the pre season friendly games with the Western Sydney Wanderers squad. After impressive pre season performances, he was selected to play for the Western Sydney Wanderers Youth squad. He immediately made an impact in assisting and scoring goals which caught the attention of former senior Wanderers head coach Tony Popovic.

On 29 November 2015, Shabow made his senior club debut as substitute coming on in the 80th minute for Romeo Castelen, away to the Central Coast Mariners. On 11 May 2016, Western Sydney Wanderers signed Shabow on a one-year senior contract, becoming one of the first players to join from the Wanderers Youth Academy for the 2016–2017 A League Season.

His second appearance for the Wanderers came on 21 February 2017, in the Asian Champions League group stage qualifier against Urawa Reds at Campbelltown Stadium, Coming on in the 69th minute. Western Sydney Wanderers were defeated 4–0 on the night.

=== Newcastle Jets ===
On 5 April 2017, Shabow signed a two-year contract with Newcastle Jets, linking him up with the team at the start of the 2017–18 A-League season. Shabow's decision to join the club was to gain more first team opportunities. On 29 October 2017, Shabow made his Newcastle Jets debut coming on as a substitute in the 84th minute against the Western Sydney Wanderers. In June 2018, Shabow Departed the club after one season by mutual agreement. He made seven appearances for the club.

=== Central Coast Mariners ===
On 7 June 2018, Shabow signed a two-year contract with A-League side Central Coast Mariners. On 11 November 2018, he made his first appearance for The Mariners away to Melbourne Victory, scoring a goal with his first touch of the ball in the 62nd minute of the game, after coming on as a second-half substitute. On 23 December 2018, Shabow made his starting debut for Central Coast Mariners at home against Newcastle Jets.

Shabow was released by the Mariners in March 2020. He joined Blacktown City FC, which compete in the National Premier Leagues NSW.

== International career ==
=== Australia Under 20 ===
In 2015, Shabow was selected to represent the Young Socceroos, despite being eligible to play for his heritage country Iraq, for the AFC U-19 Championship Qualifiers which were held in Laos. In his second appearance for the Young Socceroos, he scored a second half goal which earned them a 2–0 win over Laos.

In September 2016, Shabow was selected in the squad for the 2016 AFF U-19 Youth Championship, which was held in Vietnam. He helped the team with goals against Indonesia and Vietnam in the group stage.

Shabow was again named in squad for the 2016 AFC U-19 Championship. In their opening game against China, He scored a goal giving the Young Socceroos a 1–0 victory.

== Honours ==
Sydney United

- Waratah Cup: 2025

Australia U20

- AFF U-19 Youth Championship: 2016
