= Arizky Wahyu Satria =

Indonesian footballer (born 1998)

Arizky Satria
Personal information
- Full name: Arizky Wahyu Satria
- Date of birth: 7 August 1998 (age 28)
- Place of birth: Surabaya, Indonesia
- Height: 1.70 m (5 ft 7 in)
- Position: Right-back

Team information
- Current team: Persesa Sampang
- Number: 2

Youth career
- 2014–2016: ASIFA

Senior career*
Years	Team	Apps	(Gls)
2017	Perssu Sumenep	2	(0)
2021–2023	Persebaya Surabaya	10	(0)
2025–	Persesa Sampang	7	(0)

International career
2016	Indonesia U19	5	(0)
- * Club domestic league appearances and goals as of 23 January 2025

Arizky Wahyu Satria (born 7 August 1998) is an Indonesian professional footballer who plays as a right-back for Liga 4 club Persesa Sampang.

== Club career ==
=== Persebaya Surabaya ===
He was signed for Persebaya Surabaya to play in Liga 1 in the 2021 season. Arizky made his league debut on 4 September 2021 in a match against Borneo at the Wibawa Mukti Stadium, Cikarang.
