= Jakkit Wachpirom =

Thai footballer (born 1997)

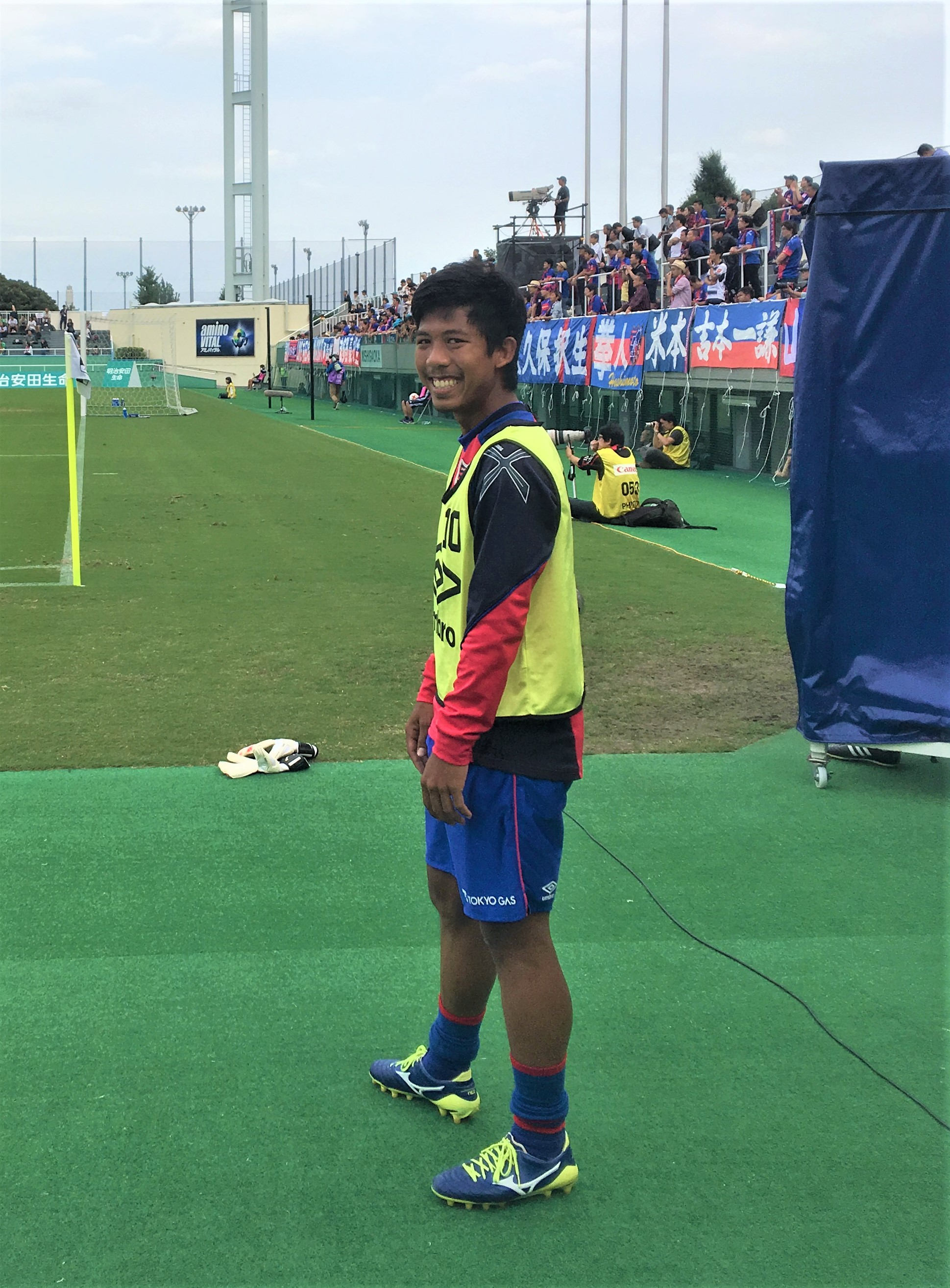
- Jakkit with FC Tokyo U-23

Personal information
- Full name: Jakkit Wachpirom
- Date of birth: 26 January 1997 (age 29)
- Place of birth: Chanthaburi, Thailand
- Height: 1.72 m (5 ft 7 1/2 in)
- Positions: Right-back; winger

Team information
- Current team: Uthai Thani
- Number: 17

Youth career
- 2012–2014: Surasakmontree School

Senior career*
Years	Team	Apps	(Gls)
2015–2021	Bangkok United	3	(0)
2016	→ Chainat Hornbill (loan)	8	(1)
2017–2018	→ FC Tokyo U-23 (loan)	33	(2)
2019	→ Samut Prakan City (loan)	1	(0)
2021–2022	Suphanburi	13	(1)
2022–2025	Sukhothai	73	(4)
2025–	Uthai Thani	5	(0)

International career
2015–2016	Thailand U19	13	(5)
2018	Thailand U21	3	(1)
2017–2018	Thailand U23	15	(1)
- * Club domestic league appearances and goals as of 03:34, 11 March 2025 (UTC)

Jakkrit Wachpirom (Thai จักรกฤษณ์ เวชภิรมย์) or simply known as Ice (Thai: ไอซ์), is a Thai professional footballer who plays as a right-back for Thai League 1 club Uthai Thani, he has also been used as a winger.

== International career ==
He won the 2015 AFF U-19 Youth Championship with Thailand U19. In December 2017, he play for Thailand U23 in the 2017 M-150 Cup and 2018 he squad for the 2018 AFC U-23 Championship in China.

== International goals ==
=== U23 ===
Jakkit Wachpirom – goals for Thailand U23
No	Date	Venue	Opponent	Score	Result	Competition
1.	1 August 2018	Mandalarthiri Stadium, Mandalay, Myanmar	Bahrain	0–2	3–2	2018 Alpine Cup

=== U21 ===
Jakkit Wachpirom – goals for Thailand U21
#	Date	Venue	Opponent	Score	Result	Competition
1.	19 November 2018	Wanzhou Pailou Sports Stadium, Wanzhou, China	Iceland	1–1	1–1	2018 CFA Under-21

=== U19 ===
Jakkit Wachpirom – goals for Thailand U19
No	Date	Venue	Opponent	Score	Result	Competition
1.	24 August 2015	New Laos National Stadium, Vientiane, Laos	Laos	1–0	2–1	2015 AFF U-19 Youth Championship
2.	24 August 2015	New Laos National Stadium, Vientiane, Laos	Laos	2–0	2–1	2015 AFF U-19 Youth Championship
3.	30 August 2015	New Laos National Stadium, Vientiane, Laos	Cambodia	2–0	6–0	2015 AFF U-19 Youth Championship
4.	16 September 2016	Hàng Đẫy Stadium, Hanoi, Vietnam	Cambodia	1–1	2–1	2016 AFF U-19 Youth Championship
5.	24 September 2016	Hàng Đẫy Stadium, Hanoi, Vietnam	Australia	5–1	5–1	2016 AFF U-19 Youth Championship

== Honours ==
=== International ===
Thailand U-19

- AFF U-19 Youth Championship
  - Winners (1) : 2015
