= Sansern Limwattana =

Thai footballer (born 1997)

Personal information
- Full name: Sansern Limwattana
- Date of birth: 30 June 1997 (age 29)
- Place of birth: Samut Prakan, Thailand
- Height: 1.73 m (5 ft 8 in)
- Position: Midfielder

Youth career
- 2011–2013: Onehunga Sports

Senior career*
Years	Team	Apps	(Gls)
2013–2014	Waitakere United	9	(1)
2014	Sriracha Banbueng	25	(1)
2014–2015	Buriram United	0	(0)
2015	→ Surin City (loan)	20	(3)
2015	→ Phichit (loan)	8	(1)
2016–2018	Bangkok United	14	(1)
2017	→ Ubon UMT United (loan)	10	(0)
2017–2018	→ Sukhothai (loan)	40	(0)
2019–2024	Port	12	(0)
2019	→ Ayutthaya United (loan)	15	(3)
2020–2021	→ Trat (loan)	12	(3)
2022–2023	→ Chiangmai United (loan)	21	(0)
2023–2024	→ Sukhothai (loan)	11	(0)
2024	Navy	3	(1)

International career
2014–2016	Thailand U19	13	(3)
2016–2018	Thailand U21	2	(0)
2018–2019	Thailand U23	3	(1)
- * Club domestic league appearances and goals as of 19 May 2024

Sansern Limwattana (Thai: สรรเสริญ ลิ้มวัฒนะ, born June 30, 1997) is a Thai professional footballer who plays as a midfielder.

== Personal life ==
Sansern has a brother Baramee Limwattana is also a footballer and plays for Buriram United as a Midfield.

== Clubs ==
Youth

Year	Club
2011–2013	Onehunga Sports

Senior

Year	Club	League
2013–2014	Waitakere United	ASB Premiership
2014	Sriracha Banbueng	Thai Division 1 League
2014–	Buriram United	Thai League T1
2015	Surin City (loan)	Thai Division 1 League
2015	Phichit (loan)	Thai Division 1 League
2016	Bangkok United	Thai League T1

== International career ==
He won the 2015 AFF U-19 Youth Championship with Thailand U19.

=== International goals ===
==== Under-23 ====
#	Date	Venue	Opponent	Score	Result	Competition
1.	31 May 2018	PTIK Stadium, Jakarta, Indonesia	Indonesia	1–1	1–2	Friendly

==== Under-19 ====
#	Date	Venue	Opponent	Score	Result	Competition
1.	26 August 2015	New Laos National Stadium, Vientiane, Laos	Philippines	2–0	4–1	2015 AFF U-19 Youth Championship
2.	28 August 2015	New Laos National Stadium, Vientiane, Laos	Brunei	1–0	6–0	2015 AFF U-19 Youth Championship
3.	4 September 2015	New Laos National Stadium, Vientiane, Laos	Malaysia	3–0	5–0	2015 AFF U-19 Youth Championship

== Honours ==
=== International ===
Thailand U-19

- AFF U-19 Youth Championship : 2015
