= Ly Vahed =

Cambodian footballer

Ly Vahed លី វ៉ាហេទ
Personal information
- Full name: Ly Vahed
- Date of birth: December 26, 1998 (age 27)
- Place of birth: Kampong Cham, Cambodia
- Height: 1.76 m (5 ft 9 1/2 in)
- Position: Centre back

Team information
- Current team: Boeung Ket
- Number: 4

Youth career
- 2012–2014: Boeung Ket

Senior career*
Years	Team	Apps	(Gls)
2014–	Boeung Ket		

International career^{‡}
2015–2016	Cambodia U19	8	(0)
2016	Cambodia	1	(0)
- * Club domestic league appearances and goals ‡ National team caps and goals as of 13 February 2017

Ly Vahed (Khmer: លី វ៉ាហេត born 16 August 1998) is a Cambodian footballer who plays as a centre back for Boeung Ket and the Cambodia national football team.

== International career ==
He made his debut in a friendly match against Saudi Arabia national football team on 14 January 2017

== Honours ==
=== Club ===
Boeung Ket

- Cambodian League: 2016, 2017
- 2015 Mekong Club Championship: Runner up
