= Piyaphong Pathammavong =

Laotian footballer (born 1998)

Personal information
- Full name: Piyaphong Pathammavong
- Date of birth: September 8, 1998 (age 28)
- Place of birth: Laos
- Position: Defender

Team information
- Current team: Muanghat United F.C.

Senior career*
Years	Team	Apps	(Gls)
2015-2016	Young Elephants FC		
2017-2018	Lao Toyota		
2019	Vientiane		
2020	Lao Toyota		
2022-	Muanghat		

International career^{‡}
2015–	Laos	2	(0)
- * Club domestic league appearances and goals ‡ National team caps and goals as of 17 November 2015

Piyaphong Pathammavong (born 8 September 1998) is a Laotian footballer who plays as a defender.
