= Trần Duy Khánh =

Vietnamese footballer

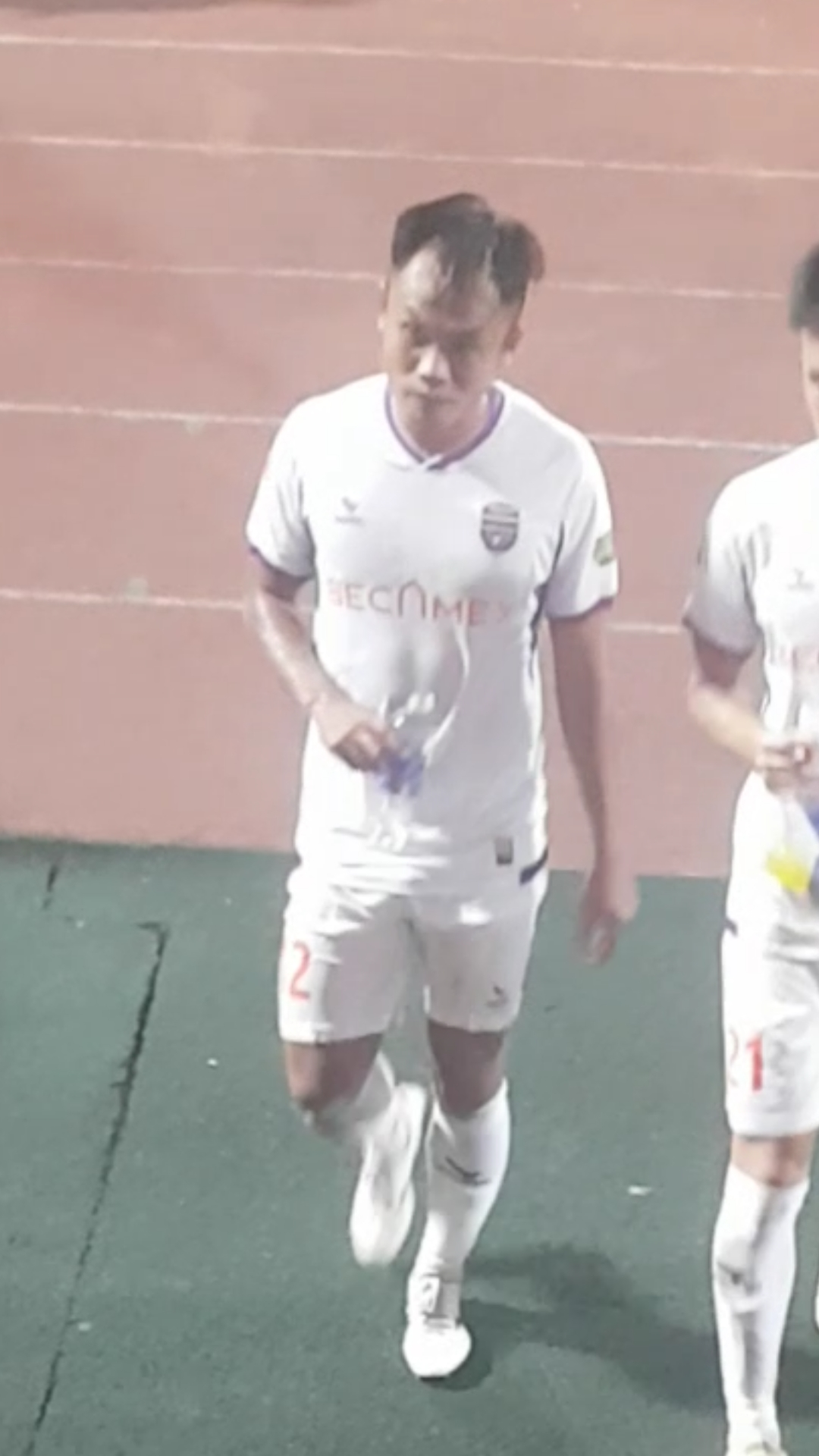
- Duy Khánh in 2024

Personal information
- Full name: Trần Duy Khánh
- Date of birth: 20 July 1997 (age 29)
- Place of birth: Phú Giáo, Bình Dương, Vietnam
- Height: 1.72 m (5 ft 8 in)
- Position: Midfielder

Team information
- Current team: Hồ Chí Minh City
- Number: 10

Youth career
- 2008–2015: Becamex Bình Dương

Senior career*
Years	Team	Apps	(Gls)
2016–2017	Becamex Bình Dương	12	(1)
2018–2019	Bình Định	17	(0)
2020–2025	Becamex Bình Dương	40	(1)
2025–	Hồ Chí Minh City	8	(0)

International career
2015–2016	Vietnam U19	2	(0)
- * Club domestic league appearances and goals as of 22 June 2025

Trần Duy Khánh (born 20 July 1997) is a Vietnamese professional footballer who plays as a midfielder for V.League 2 club Hồ Chí Minh City.

== Honours ==
Becamex Bình Dương

- Vietnamese National Cup: 2018; runner-up 2017
- Vietnamese Super Cup: 2016; runner-up 2019
