= 2017 Vietnamese Cup =

Tournament details
- Country: Vietnam
- Teams: 21

Final positions
- Champions: Sông Lam Nghệ An (3rd title)
- Runners-up: Becamex Bình Dương

Tournament statistics
- Matches played: 27
- Top goal scorer: Gastón Merlo (7 goals)

The 2017 National Cup was the 25th edition of the Vietnamese National Cup. It was sponsored by Sứ Thiên Thanh, and known as the Sứ Thiên Thanh National Cup for sponsorship purposes. This year's competition, which features 21 teams including V.League 1's 14 teams and National First Division's 7 teams. The winner are qualified to AFC Cup.

== Round one ==
4 February 2017	Bình Phước (2)	2 – 0	Đồng Tháp (2)	Bình Phước Stadium
				Attendance: 4,000

4 February 2017	SHB Đà Nẵng (1)	6 – 1	Fico Tây Ninh (2)	Hòa Xuân Stadium
				Attendance: 5,000

4 February 2017	Sông Lam Nghệ An (1)	3 – 1	Đắk Lắk (2)	Vinh Stadium
				Attendance: 1,500

5 February 2017	Viettel (2)	1 – 1 (5 – 4 p)	Bóng đá Huế (2)	Hàng Đẫy Stadium
				Attendance: 1,000

5 February 2017	Hải Phòng (1)	1 – 1 (5 – 4 p)	Nam Định (2)	Lạch Tray Stadium
				Attendance: 8,000

== Round two ==
3 June 2017	SHB Đà Nẵng (1)	5–1	FLC Thanh Hóa (1)	Hòa Xuân Stadium, Đà Nẵng
				Attendance: 5000

3 June 2017	Long An (1)	0–2	XSKT Cần Thơ (1)	Long An Stadium, Tân An
				Attendance: 500

3 June 2017	Sài Gòn (1)	1–1 (4 - 3 p)	Hoàng Anh Gia Lai (1)	Thống Nhất Stadium, Hồ Chí Minh City
				Attendance: 3500

3 June 2017	Sanna Khánh Hòa (1)	0–0 (2 - 3 p)	TP Hồ Chí Minh (1)	Nha Trang Stadium, Nha Trang
				Attendance: 2000

4 June 2017	Becamex Bình Dương (1)	3–2	Viettel (2)	Gò Đậu Stadium, Thủ Dầu Một
				Attendance: 1000

4 June 2017	Hà Nội (1)	1–1 (3 - 4 p)	Sông Lam Nghệ An (1)	Mỹ Đình National Stadium, Hà Nội
				Attendance: 1000

4 June 2017	Than Quảng Ninh (1)	2–0	Bình Phước (2)	Cẩm Phả Stadium, Cẩm Phả
				Attendance: 4500

4 June 2017	Quảng Nam (1)	2–1	Hải Phòng (1)	Tam Kỳ Stadium, Tam Kỳ
				Attendance: 1000

== Quarter-finals ==
=== 1st Legs ===
16 June 2017	XSKT Cần Thơ (1)	1–3	Quảng Nam (1)

16 June 2017	Sông Lam Nghệ An (1)	3–1	TP Hồ Chí Minh (1)

16 June 2017	Than Quảng Ninh (1)	0–3	SHB Đà Nẵng (1)

16 June 2017	Sài Gòn (1)	2–3	Becamex Bình Dương (1)

=== 2nd Legs ===
20 June 2017	Quảng Nam (1)	3–0	XSKT Cần Thơ (1)

Quảng Nam won 6-1 on aggregate

20 June 2017	TP Hồ Chí Minh (1)	0–4	Sông Lam Nghệ An (1)

Sông Lam Nghệ An won 7-1 on aggregate

20 June 2017	SHB Đà Nẵng (1)	1–1	Than Quảng Ninh (1)

SHB Đà Nẵng won 4-1 on aggregate

20 June 2017	Becamex Bình Dương (1)	2–1	Sài Gòn (1)

Becamex Bình Dương won 5-3 on aggregate

== Semi-finals ==
=== 1st Legs ===
27 September 2017	Sông Lam Nghệ An (1)	4–1	Quảng Nam (1)

27 September 2017	SHB Đà Nẵng (1)	1–3	Becamex Bình Dương (1)

=== 2nd Legs ===
6 October 2017	Quảng Nam (1)	3–3	Sông Lam Nghệ An (1)

Sông Lam Nghệ An won 7–4 on aggregate

6 October 2017	Becamex Bình Dương (1)	2–1	SHB Đà Nẵng (1)

Becamex Bình Dương won 5–2 on aggregate

== Final ==
=== 1st Legs ===
9 November 2017	Becamex Bình Dương (1)	1–2	Sông Lam Nghệ An (1)
				Referee: Hoang Anh Tuan

=== 2nd Legs ===
30 November 2017	Sông Lam Nghệ An (1)	5–1	Becamex Bình Dương (1)
	Kovačević 18'; Phan Văn Đức 25', 36'; Olaha 75'; Hồ Phúc Tịnh 90+2'		Nguyễn Anh Đức 28'	Referee: Hoang Ngoc Ha

Sông Lam Nghệ An won 7–2 on aggregate
