= José Oliveira (footballer, born 1997) =

East Timorese footballer (born 1997)

Personal information
- Full name: Jose Maria dos Reis Dias Oliveira
- Date of birth: 28 October 1997 (age 29)
- Place of birth: East Timor, Indonesia
- Height: 1.78 m (5 ft 10 in)
- Position: Midfielder

Team information
- Current team: PS Atambua

Senior career*
| Years | Team | Apps | (Gls) |
| 2014– | PS Atambua | | |

International career^{‡}
| 2009–2010 | Timor-Leste U-16 | 0 | (0) |
| 2015–2016 | Timor-Leste U-19 | 8 | (1) |
| 2015–2019 | Timor-Leste U-23 | 3 | (0) |
| 2014– | Timor-Leste | 10 | (1) |
- * Club domestic league appearances and goals ‡ National team caps and goals as of 5 November 2016

José Oliveira (born 28 October 1997) is a football player who currently plays for Timor-Leste national football team.

== International career ==
José Oliveira made his senior international debut in an 8-0 loss against United Arab Emirates national football team in the 2018 FIFA World Cup qualification on 12 November 2015.

=== International goals ===
Scores and results list Chinese Taipei's goal tally first.

| # | Date | Venue | Opponent | Score | Result | Competition |
|---|---|---|---|---|---|---|
| 1. | 11 October 2016 | National Stadium, Kaohsiung, Taiwan | Chinese Taipei | 1–2 | 1–2 | 2019 AFC Asian Cup qualification |
