= 2010–11 in Australian soccer =

Soccer in Australia
- Season: 2010–11

Men's soccer
- A-League Premiership: Brisbane Roar (1st title)
- A-League Championship: Brisbane Roar (1st title)

Women's soccer
- W-League Premiership: Sydney FC
- W-League Championship: Brisbane Roar

The 2010–11 season was the 42nd season of national competitive Soccer in Australia and 128th overall.

== Promotion and relegation (pre-season) ==
Teams promoted to the A-League 2010-11

- Melbourne Heart

Teams promoted to the New South Wales Premier League 2010

- Rockdale City Suns FC

Teams demoted to the New South Wales Super League

- Penrith Nepean United FC (Now Defunct)

Teams promoted to the Victorian Premier League 2010

- Bentleigh Greens FC
- Northcote City SC

Teams demoted to the Victorian State League Division One

- Preston Lions FC
- Whittlesea Zebras FC

== Managerial changes ==
=== A-League ===
Team	Outgoing manager	Manner of departure	Date of vacancy	Table	Incoming manager	Date of appointment	Table
Central Coast Mariners	Lawrie McKinna	Reassigned	9 February 2010	8th (09–10)	Graham Arnold	10 February 2010	Pre-season
Melbourne Heart	N/A (New Club)				John van 't Schip	12 October 2009	Pre-season
North Queensland Fury	Ian Ferguson	Moved to Perth Glory (asst.)	6 April 2010	7th (09-10)	František Straka	7 June 2010	Pre-season
Adelaide United	Aurelio Vidmar	Promoted to Olyroos coach & Socceroos assistant coach	3 June 2010	10th (09–10)	TBA	TBA	Pre-season

=== New South Wales Premier League ===
Team	Outgoing	Manner	Date	Incoming	Date
Sydney United FC	Ante Milicic	Mutual Agreement	18 November 2009	David Zdrilic	4 December 2009
Blacktown City Demons FC	Ken Schembri	Resigned	15 October 2009	Aytek Genc	15 October 2009
Manly United	Phil Moss	Moved to CCM as assistant coach to Graham Arnold.	14 May 2010	Craig Midgley	14 May 2010

== Events ==
=== January ===
- 6th: Australia play their final away game for the 2011 AFC Asian Cup qualification against Kuwait in Kuwait City and draw 2–2.

=== February ===
- 9th: Central Coast Mariners manager Lawrie McKinna is sacked from his position as head manager, and reassigned to director of footballing operations at the club, following a 2009 AFC Champions League campaign in which the Mariners failed to win a game, as well as missing out on the finals for the 2009–10 A-League season.
- 10th: Former Socceroos player and manager Graham Arnold is announced as the second-ever manager of the Central Coast Mariners the day after Lawrie McKinna was reassigned other duties within the club.
- 14th: Sydney FC defeat Melbourne Victory 2–0 at the Sydney Football Stadium in their final round 27 match to win the Premiers Plate, and book their position into the Asian Champions League

=== March ===
- 3rd: Australia play Indonesia in Brisbane and win 1–0, clinching qualification through to the 2011 AFC Asian Cup.
- 20th: Sydney FC defeat arch rivals Melbourne Victory 4–2 on penalties at Etihad Stadium in the 2010 A-League Grand Final giving Sydney FC their 2nd Championship and first Premiership & Championship double.

=== April ===
- 6th: North Queensland Fury manager Ian Ferguson announces he will be leaving the club as head manager and joining the Perth Glory following a turbulent season which saw him come under much scrutiny following results, players chosen as well as off field issues, including a public spiff with marquee player Robbie Fowler, who also signed with Perth Glory in the off season.
- 10th: Australia national team coach Pim Verbeek announced he will be quitting as Socceroos coach post-World Cup and will join the Morocco Football Federation as National Youth Technical Director.
- 27th: Adelaide United lose the final match of their Group H match against Shandong Luneng in the 2010 AFC Champions League group stage however move through to the next round.
- 28th: Melbourne Victory are knocked out of the Group Stage of the 2010 Asian Champions League, finishing last in Group E.

=== May ===
- 12th: Adelaide United are knocked out of the 2010 Asian Champions League after going down 3–2 in extra time to K-League club Jeonbuk Hyundai Motors in Adelaide.
- 24th: Australia play their final game on Australian Soil before the 2010 World Cup against New Zealand at the Melbourne Cricket Ground, Australia win 2–1 with goals from Dario Vidosic & Brett Holman.

=== June ===
- 1st: Australia play a friendly against Denmark in South Africa and win 1–0.
- 3rd: Aurelio Vidmar coach of Adelaide United steps down to accept a role as Socceroos assistant coach as well as head coach for the Australia national under-23 football team during the 2012 Olympic Games in London.
- 5th: Australia play a friendly against the United States in South Africa and lose 3–1.
- 7th: North Queensland Fury announce they have signed former Czechoslovak international František Straka as their head manager for the 2010-11 A-League season, following Ian Ferguson's departure to Perth Glory.
- 13th: 2010 FIFA World Cup: Australia are defeated 4–0 by Germany in their opening group game of the World Cup. Midfielder Tim Cahill was controversially sent off.
- 19th: 2010 FIFA World Cup: Australia draw their game against Ghana 1–1 in an eventful match which saw star striker Harry Kewell sent off, Australia's second of the tournament.
- 24th: 2010 FIFA World Cup: Australia win their final game against Serbia 2–1, however it is not enough to qualify for the Round of 16, Germany defeating Ghana 1–0. to top the group, with Ghana coming second, Australia third, and Serbia 4th.

=== July ===
- 1st: Socceroos veteran Craig Moore retires from both international and club football following Australia's exit from the 2010 FIFA World Cup.

=== August ===
- 5th: The 2010-11 A-League season kicks off with new team Melbourne Heat being defeated by Central Coast Mariners 1–0 at AAMI Park in front of 11,000.
- 11th: The Socceroos lose 2–0 to Slovenia in a friendly at Športni park Stožice, Slovenia.

=== September ===
- 7th: Australia defeat Poland 2–1 in Poland.

== Retirements ==
- 11 February 2010: Steve Corica, 37-year-old Sydney FC midfielder after sustaining a hamstring injury in the final game of the season against Melbourne Victory which required surgery, thus ending his season. Corica represented Australia 32 times, scoring 5 times.
- 11 February 2010: Robbie Middleby, 34-year-old North Queensland Fury midfielder. Previously played for Sydney FC, as well as several clubs in the old National Soccer League.
- 3 May 2010: Mark Rudan, 34-year-old Adelaide United midfielder. Previously played for Sydney FC, as well as Avispa Fukuoka and FC Vaduz. Also represented Australia 3 times, although never scored for his country.
- 1 July 2010: Craig Moore, 34 years old, former Brisbane Roar and Socceroos defender. Played nearly 200 games for Scottish Premier League club Rangers F.C., as well as in England with Crystal Palace and Newcastle United. Finished his career in the A-League with Brisbane Roar before a pre-world cup stint in Greece with Kavala. Represented the Australia national team 52 times, including 2 FIFA World Cup Appearances in Germany and in South Africa, after which he announced his retirement from club and international football.
- 2 July 2010: Scott Chipperfield, 34 years old, FC Basel player announces his retirement from international football. However will continue playing for Swiss Super League club FC Basel for the upcoming 2010–11 season, with his full retirement expected to be announced soon after. Played 68 times, scoring 12 goals for Australia and represented his country in both the 2006 FIFA World Cup in Germany, and the 2010 FIFA World Cup in South Africa.

== National teams ==
=== Men's senior ===
==== Friendlies ====
11 August 2010	Slovenia	2–0	Australia	Športni park Stožice, Ljubljana, Slovenia
UTC+2	Dedic 78'; Ljubijankic 90+1'	Report		Attendance: 16,000; Referee: Paolo Tagliavento (Italy)

3 September 2010	Switzerland	0 – 0	Australia	AFG Arena, St. Gallen, Switzerland
UTC+2		Report		Attendance: 14, 660; Referee: Thomas Einwaller (Austria)

7 September 2010	Poland	1 – 2	Australia	Stadion Miejski, Kraków, Poland
UTC+2	Lewandowski 18'	Report	Brett Holman 13'; Wilkshire (pen.), 26'

9 October 2010	Australia	1 – 0	Paraguay	Sydney Football Stadium, Sydney, Australia
UTC+2	Carney 53'	Report		Attendance: 25,210; Referee: Yuichi Nishimura (Japan)

17 November 2010	Egypt	3 – 0	Australia	Cairo, Egypt
UTC+2

5 January 2011	United Arab Emirates	0 – 0	Australia	Al Ain, United Arab Emirates
18:30 UTC+4				Stadium: Sheikh Khalifa International Stadium; Referee: Ali Shaaban

29 March 2011	Germany	1 – 2	Australia	Mönchengladbach, Germany
20:45 UTC+2	Gómez 26'		Carney 61'; Wilkshire 64' (pen.)	Stadium: Borussia-Park; Attendance: 20,000

5 June 2011	Australia	3 – 0	New Zealand	Adelaide, Australia
17:00 UTC+9:30	Kennedy 10', 59'; Troisi 93' (pen.)			Stadium: Adelaide Oval; Attendance: 21,281; Referee: Minoru Tōjō

7 June 2011	Australia	0 – 0	Serbia	Melbourne, Australia
19:30 UTC+10		Report		Stadium: Etihad Stadium; Attendance: 28,149; Referee: Minoru Tōjō

==== AFC Asian Cup ====
10 January 2011 Group Stage	India	0 – 4	Australia	Doha, Qatar
16:15 UTC+3		(Report)	Cahill 11', 65'; Kewell 24'; Holman 45+1'	Stadium: Jassim Bin Hamad Stadium; Attendance: 11,749; Referee: Ali Al Badwawi

14 January 2011 Group Stage	Australia	1 – 1	South Korea	Doha, Qatar
16:15 UTC+3	Jedinak 62'	(Report)	Koo Ja-Cheol 24'	Stadium: Al-Gharafa Stadium; Attendance: 15,526; Referee: Abdulrahman Abdou

18 January 2011 Group Stage	Australia	1 – 0	Bahrain	Doha, Qatar
16:15 UTC+3	Jedinak 37'	(Report)		Stadium: Jassim Bin Hamad Stadium; Referee: Yuichi Nishimura

22 January 2011 Quarter-finals	Australia	1 – 0 (a.e.t.)	Iraq	Doha, Qatar
16:25 UTC+3	Kewell 117'	(Report)		Stadium: Jassim Bin Hamad Stadium; Attendance: 7,889; Referee: Abdulrahman Abdou

25 January 2011 Semi-finals	Uzbekistan	0 – 6	Australia	Doha, Qatar
19:25 UTC+3		(Report)	Kewell 5'; Ognenovski 35'; Carney 65'; Emerton 74'; Valeri 82'; Kruse 83'	Stadium: Khalifa International Stadium; Attendance: 24,826; Referee: Ali Al Badwawi

29 January 2011 Final	Australia	0 – 1 (a.e.t.)	Japan	Doha, Qatar
18:00 UTC+3		Report	Lee 109'	Stadium: Khalifa International Stadium, Doha; Attendance: 37,174; Referee: Ravshan Irmatov

=== Men's under-23 ===
==== Friendlies ====
20 November 2011	Australia	0 – 1	North Korea	Hanoi, Vietnam
		Report	Pak Song-chol

22 November 2011	Vietnam	0 – 2	Australia	Hanoi, Vietnam
		Report	Hoffman 19'; Minniecon 36'

24 November 2011	Australia	0 – 0	Kuwait	Hanoi, Vietnam
		Report

1 June 2011	Japan	3 – 1	Australia	Niigata, Japan
	Nagai 45', 63'; Yuya Osako 85'	Report	Nichols 4'	Stadium: Denka Big Swan Stadium

14 June 2011	Australia	6 – 0	Singapore	Sydney, Australia
	Danning 6'; Mooy 14'; Hoffman 52'; Ješić 55'; Amini 69'; Behich 90'	Report		Stadium: Blacktown Olympic Park

==== Olympic qualifying ====
19 June 2011 Preliminary Round 2	Australia	3 – 0	Yemen	Gosford, Australia
15:00 (UTC+10)	Hoffman 14', 90'; Nichols 67'	Report		Stadium: Central Coast Stadium; Attendance: 2,597; Referee: Tan Hai (China PR)

23 June 2011 Preliminary Round 2	Yemen	0 – 4 (0 – 7 agg.)	Australia	Newcastle, Australia
18:30 (UTC+10)		Report	Hoffman 18', 31', 52'; Mooy 68'	Stadium: Ausgrid Stadium; Attendance: 3,009; Referee: Abdulrahman Abdou (Qatar)

=== Men's under-20 ===
==== Friendlies ====
27 May 2011	Germany	0 – 1	Australia	Kamen, Germany
		Report	Danning 44'

==== AFF U-19 Youth Championship ====
24 July 2010 Group stage	Australia	1 – 0	South Korea	Ho Chi Minh City, Vietnam
16:00 (UTC+7)	Petratos 23'	Report		Stadium: Thong Nhat Stadium

26 July 2010 Group stage	Thailand	1 – 1	Australia	Ho Chi Minh City, Vietnam
16:00 (UTC+7)	Sokjoho 71'	Report	Hamill 4'	Stadium: Thong Nhat Stadium

28 July 2010 Group stage	Vietnam	1 – 4	Australia	Ho Chi Minh City, Vietnam
18:30 (UTC+7)	Nguyen Van Thanh 57'	Report	Amini 1'; Leckie 14'; Halloran 40'; Babalj 73'	Stadium: Thong Nhat Stadium

30 July 2010 Final	Australia	1 – 0	Thailand	Ho Chi Minh City, Vietnam
18:00 (UTC+7)	Babalj 81'	Report		Stadium: Thong Nhat Stadium

==== AFC U-19 Championship ====
4 October 2010 Group stage	Australia	4 – 1	Yemen	Zibo, China
17:30 (UTC+8)	Danning 14'; Bulut 26' (pen.); McGowan 30'; Fletcher 83'	Report	Al-Baidhani 2'	Stadium: Linzi Stadium; Attendance: 8,432; Referee: Abdullah Al Hilali (Oman

6 October 2010 Group stage	Iran	0 – 3	Australia	Zibo, China
14:30 (UTC+8)		Report	Amini 39'; Bulut 60'; Antonis 88'	Stadium: Linzi Stadium; Attendance: 8,761; Referee: Tan Hai (China)

8 October 2010 Group stage	South Korea	0 – 0	Australia	Zibo, China
17:30 (UTC+8)		Report		Stadium: Zibo Sports Stadium; Attendance: 15,000; Referee: Mohamed Al Zarouni (United Arab Emirates)

11 October 2011 Quarter-final	Australia	4 – 2 (a.e.t.)	United Arab Emirates	Zibo, China
18:00 (UTC+8)	Bulut 6'; Amini 48'; Leckie 92'; Fletcher 104'	Report	Khalil 23' (pen.), 84'	Stadium: Linzi Stadium; Attendance: 9,000; Referee: Abdul Malik Abdul Bashir (Singapore)

14 October 2010 Semi-final	Saudi Arabia	0 – 2	Australia	Zibo, China
16:30 (UTC+8)		Report	Bulut 70', 75' (pen.)	Stadium: Linzi Stadium; Attendance: 5,430; Referee: Masaaki Toma (Japan)

17 October 2010 Final	North Korea	3 – 2	Australia	Zibo, China
19:30 (UTC+8)	Jong Il-gwan 10', 43', 89'	Report	Bulut 24', 30'	Stadium: Zibo Sports Stadium; Attendance: 31,145; Referee: Tan Hai (China)

== League tables ==
=== 2010–11 Hyundai A-League ===
Pos	Team	Pld	W	D	L	GF	GA	GD	Pts	Qualification
1	Brisbane Roar (C)	30	18	11	1	58	26	+32	65	Qualification for 2012 AFC Champions League group stage and Finals series (Note: First place qualifies for the 2012 AFC Champions League group stage. Winning the 2011 A-League Grand Final automatically earns qualification for the 2012 AFC Champions League group stage, unless first place are champions. Second place qualifies for the 2012 AFC Champions League qualifying play-off, unless they qualify for the 2011 A-League Grand Final alongside first place or become A-League Champions, subsequently third place then qualify for the 2012 AFC Champions League qualifying play-off.)
2	Central Coast Mariners	30	16	9	5	50	31	+19	57	Qualification for 2012 AFC Champions League group stage and Finals series
3	Adelaide United	30	15	5	10	51	36	+15	50	Qualification for 2012 AFC Champions League qualifying play-off and Finals series
4	Gold Coast United	30	12	10	8	40	32	+8	46	Qualification for Finals series
5	Melbourne Victory	30	11	10	9	45	39	+6	43	Qualification for Finals series
6	Wellington Phoenix	30	12	5	13	39	41	−2	41	Qualification for Finals series
7	Newcastle Jets	30	9	8	13	29	33	−4	35	
8	Melbourne Heart	30	8	11	11	32	42	−10	35	
9	Sydney FC	30	8	10	12	35	40	−5	34	
10	Perth Glory	30	5	8	17	27	54	−27	23	
11	North Queensland Fury	30	4	7	19	28	60	−32	19	

Source: ultimatealeague.com
Rules for classification: 1) points; 2) goal difference; 3) number of goals scored.
(C) Champions

=== 2010 NSWPL ===
Pos	Team	Pld	W	D	L	GF	GA	GD	Pts	Qualification or relegation
1	Bonnyrigg White Eagles	22	13	6	3	45	20	+25	45	Qualified for the 2010 NSW Premier League Finals
2	Blacktown City (C)	22	12	4	6	42	27	+15	40	Qualified for the 2010 NSW Premier League Finals
3	Sydney United	22	11	6	5	39	26	+13	39	Qualified for the 2010 NSW Premier League Finals
4	APIA Leichhardt Tigers	22	12	3	7	39	37	+2	39	Qualified for the 2010 NSW Premier League Finals
5	Marconi Stallions	22	11	3	8	26	26	0	36	Qualified for the 2010 NSW Premier League Finals
6	Sutherland Sharks	22	9	4	9	36	29	+7	31	
7	Rockdale City Suns	22	6	12	4	23	23	0	30	
8	Bankstown City	22	7	5	10	37	41	−4	26	
9	Manly United	22	7	4	11	24	31	−7	25	
10	South Coast Wolves	22	6	4	12	32	39	−7	22	
11	Sydney Olympic	22	6	3	13	29	40	−11	21	
12	West Sydney Berries (R)	22	2	6	14	17	50	−33	12	Relegated to the 2011 NSW Super League

Source: socceraust.co.uk, NSW Premier League
Rules for classification: 1) points; 2) goal difference; 3) number of goals scored.
(C) Champions; (R) Relegated

=== 2010 VPL ===
Pos	Team	Pld	W	D	L	GF	GA	GD	Pts	Qualification or relegation
1	Richmond	22	12	4	6	33	26	+7	40	Victorian Premier League Finals
2	Hume City	22	12	6	4	41	29	+12	39 (Note: Hume City, Heidelberg Utd & Melbourne Knights were given a situation pending 3 point deduction as a result of failure to adhere to Rules of Competition 2009 – Section 1.6. South Melbourne lost 6 points because of an incident during the Round 6 home fixture against Heidelberg United.)	Victorian Premier League Finals
3	Green Gully (C)	22	11	3	8	37	23	+14	36	Victorian Premier League Finals
4	Heidelberg United	22	10	6	6	34	33	+1	33	Victorian Premier League Finals
5	Northcote City	22	9	4	9	47	35	+12	31	Victorian Premier League Finals
6	South Melbourne	22	10	6	6	41	28	+13	30	
7	Oakleigh Cannons	22	9	3	10	30	31	−1	30	
8	Dandenong Thunder	22	9	4	9	24	30	−6	28	
9	Melbourne Knights	22	7	5	10	30	37	−7	23	
10	Bentleigh Greens	22	5	6	11	19	36	−17	21	
11	Altona Magic	22	5	5	12	39	46	−7	20	Relegation to Vic State League Div 1
12	Sunshine George Cross	22	5	4	13	20	41	−21	19	Relegation to Vic State League Div 1

Rules for classification: 1) points; 2) goal difference; 3) number of goals scored.
(C) Champions

== Trophy & League Champions ==
Competition	Winner	Details	Match Report
Hyundai A-League Premiers			
Hyundai A-League Champions			
New South Wales Premier League	Bonnyrigg White Eagles (Premiers); Blacktown City Demons (champions)		Premiers Report; Championship Report
Victorian Premier League			
NSW Waratah Cup	Marconi Stallions	0–0 (7–6 penalties)	Report

== Australian clubs in international competition ==
=== Summary ===
Club	Competition	Final round
Melbourne Victory	2011 AFC Champions League	Group Stage
Sydney FC	2011 AFC Champions League	Group Stage

Win Tie Loss

=== Melbourne Victory ===
1 March 2011 2011 Champions League Group E	Gamba Osaka	5–1	Melbourne Victory	Suita, Japan
19:00 UTC+8	Takei 4'; Adriano 7' (pen.); Lee 10'; Futagawa 62'; Kim 90+1'	(Report)	Muscat 21' (pen.)	Stadium: Osaka Expo '70 Stadium; Attendance: 12,949; Referee: Ali Hamad Al-Badwawi (United Arab Emirates)

15 March 2011 2011 Champions League Group E	Melbourne Victory	1–2	Jeju United	Melbourne, Australia
19:30 UTC+11	Allsoppp 37'	(Report)	Park 41'; Lee 84'	Stadium: Etihad Stadium; Attendance: 4,825; Referee: Subkhiddin Mohd Salleh (Malaysia)

5 April 2011 2011 Champions League Group E	Tianjin Teda	1–1	Melbourne Victory	Tianjin, China
19:30 UTC+08	Zorić 19'	(Report)	Muscat 52'	Stadium: TEDA Football Stadium; Attendance: 25,456; Referee: Valentin Kovalenko (Uzbekistan)

20 April 2011 2011 Champions League Group E	Melbourne Victory	2–1	Tianjin Teda	Melbourne, Australia
19:30 UTC+10	Hernández 44'; Muscat 45+1' (pen.)	(Report)	Tao 37'	Stadium: Etihad Stadium; Attendance: 5,693; Referee: Alireza Faghani (Iran)

4 May 2011 2011 Champions League Group E	Melbourne Victory	1–1	Gamba Osaka	Melbourne, Australia
19:30 UTC+10	Leijer 12'	(Report)	Nakazawa 43'	Stadium: Etihad Stadium; Attendance: 7,437; Referee: Abdulrahman Abdou (Qatar)

11 May 2011 2011 Champions League Group E	Jeju United	1–1	Melbourne Victory	Seogwipo, South Korea
19:30 UTC+9	Kim 25'	(Report)	Ferreira 61'	Stadium: Jeju World Cup Stadium; Attendance: 1,519; Referee: Valentin Kovalenko (Uzbekistan)

=== Sydney FC ===
2 March 2011 2011 Champions League Group H	Sydney FC	0–0	Suwon Samsung Bluewings	Sydney
20:00 UTC+11		(Report)		Stadium: Sydney Football Stadium; Attendance: 7,095; Referee: Abdul Malik (Singapore)

6 April 2011 2011 Champions League Group H	Sydney FC	1–1	Shanghai Shenhua	Sydney
20:00 UTC+10	Carle 12'	(Report)	Riascos 6'	Stadium: Sydney Football Stadium; Attendance: 7,007; Referee: Abdullah Balideh (Qatar)

13 April 2011 2011 Champions League Group H	Sydney FC	0–3	Kashima Antlers	Sydney
20:00 UTC+10		(Report)	Nozawa 41'; Gabriel 51'; Koroki 90+2'	Stadium: Sydney Football Stadium; Attendance: 7,320; Referee: Ali Al Badwawi (United Arab Emirates)

19 April 2011 2011 Champions League Group H	Shanghai Shenhua	2–3	Sydney FC	Shanghai, China
20:00 UTC+8	Jiajun 8'; Jamieson 52' (o.g.)	(Report)	Cazarine 45+1', 59'; Bridge 90+3'	Stadium: Hongkou Football Stadium; Attendance: 10,215; Referee: Subkhiddin Mohd Salleh (Malaysia)

3 May 2011 2011 Champions League Group H	Suwon Samsung Bluewings	3–1	Sydney FC	Suwon, South Korea
19:30 UTC+9	Ha 34'; Neretljak 50'; Yeom 80'	(Report)	Cazarine 51'	Stadium: Suwon World Cup Stadium; Attendance: 9,495; Referee: Ravshan Irmatov (Uzbekistan)

10 May 2011 2011 Champions League Group H	Kashima Antlers	2–1	Sydney FC	Tokyo, Japan
15:00 UTC+9	Osako 64'; Nozawa 84'	(Report)	Jurman 26'	Stadium: National Olympic Stadium; Attendance: 3,164; Referee: Khalil Al Ghamdi (Saudi Arabia)
