= Yasser Al-Fahmi =

Saudi Arabian footballer

Personal information
- Full name: Yasser Hussein Al-Fahmi
- Date of birth: December 20, 1991 (age 34)
- Place of birth: Mecca, Saudi Arabia
- Height: 1.70 m (5 ft 7 in)
- Positions: Attacking midfielder; second striker

Youth career
- 2004–2009: Heraa Club
- 2009–2010: Al-Ahli

Senior career*
Years	Team	Apps	(Gls)
2010–2018	Al-Ahli	10	(1)
2016–2017	→ Al-Wehda (loan)	8	(0)
2018	Al-Batin	1	(0)
2019–2020	Jeddah	30	(2)
2020–2021	Ohod	2	(0)
2021–2022	Jeddah	29	(0)
2022–2023	Al-Qadsiah	3	(0)
2024	Al-Jubail	4	(0)

International career
2010–2011	Saudi Arabia U-20	14	(5)
2012–2014	Saudi Arabia U-23	6	(2)
- * Club domestic league appearances and goals as of 19 February 2024

Yasser Hussein Al-Fahmi (Arabic: ياسر حسين الفهمي; born 20 December 1991) is a Saudi professional footballer who currently plays as an attacking midfielder.

== Club career ==
=== Early career ===
Fahmi was born in Mecca, Saudi Arabia in 1991. At the age of thirteen he played Al-Hara Club until 2009 he signed with Al-Ahli Club.

=== Al-Ahli ===
Yasser Al-Fahmi joined Al-Ahli club as a youth player. He spent 8 years at the club and helped Al-Ahli win the Saudi Federation Cup and the King Cup of Champions, among many other achievements. He played an instrumental role in Al-Ahli's run in the 2012 AFC Champions League where the club reached the final. However, during a friendly against Al-Qadsia in August 2012 he suffered an ACL and spent six months on the sideline.

=== Al-Qadsiah ===
On 31 August 2022, Al-Fahmi joined Al-Qadsiah.

=== Al-Jubail ===
On 31 January 2024, Al-Fahmi joined Saudi Second Division side Al-Jubail.

== International career ==
He played for Saudi Arabia U-20 as in 2010 AFC U-19 Championship and 2011 FIFA U-20 World Cup.

=== 2010 AFC U-19 Championship 2010 ===
He scored his first goal for the national team in the AFC U-19 Championship 2010 against Syria U-20 in the 41st Minute and they won by a score of 1–0, although they lost the Semi-final versus Australia U-20 2–0.

=== 2011 FIFA U-20 World Cup ===
His first goal in the FIFA U-20 world championships was scored against Croatia U-20 after 54 minutes, and they won the game 2–0. His second came against Guatemala U-20 within 24 minutes, they won score is 6-0 but they were finally knocked out in the Last 16 by Brazil U-20 0 goals to 3.

== International goals ==
=== Under-20 ===
#	Date	Venue	Opponent	Score	Result	Competition
1	5 November 2009	Franso Hariri Stadium, Arbil	Afghanistan	4-1	5-1	2010 AFC U-19 Championship qualification
2	5 November 2009	Franso Hariri Stadium, Arbil	Afghanistan	5-1	5-1	2010 AFC U-19 Championship qualification
3	7 October 2010	Linzi Stadium, Linzi	Syria	1-0	1-0	2010 AFC U-19 Championship
4	31 July 2011	Estadio Centenario, Armenia	Croatia	1-0	2-0	2011 FIFA U-20 World Cup
5	3 August 2011	Estadio Centenario, Armenia	Guatemala	2-0	6-0	2011 FIFA U-20 World Cup

=== Under-23 ===
#	Date	Venue	Opponent	Score	Result	Competition
1	30 January 2012	Prince Mohamed bin Fahd Stadium, Dammam	North Korea	1-0	1-0	Friendly match
2	3 July 2012	King Fahd International Stadium, Riyadh	Syria	1-0	2-2	2013 AFC U-22 Asian Cup qualification

== Club career statistics ==
Club	Season	League		Crown Prince Cup		King Cup		ACL		Other		Total	
Club	Season	Apps	Goals	Apps	Goals	Apps	Goals	Apps	Goals	Apps	Goals	Apps	Goals
Al-Ahli	2011–12	9	0	3	2	5	1	7	0	0	0	24	3
Al-Ahli	2012–13	1	1	0	0	0	0	0	0	1	2	2	3
Al-Ahli	Total	10	1	3	2	5	1	7	0	1	2	26	6

== Honours ==
=== Club ===
With Al-Ahli (Jeddah)

Winners

- Saudi Federation Cup: 2012.
- King Cup of Champions: 2012.

Runner-Up

- Saudi Federation Cup: 2011.
- Saudi Professional League: 2012.

=== National team career statistics ===
- 2010 AFC U-19 Championship: Semi-finals.
- 2011 FIFA U-20 World Cup: 16 Round.

=== Individual ===
- Best Saudi Promising player: 2011–12.
