= 2010 AFC U-19 Championship =

2010年亚足联U19青年锦标赛

Tournament details
- Host country: China
- Dates: 3–17 October
- Teams: 16 (from 1 confederation)
- Venues: 2 (in 1 host city)

Final positions
- Champions: North Korea (3rd title)
- Runners-up: Australia

Tournament statistics
- Matches played: 31
- Goals scored: 78 (2.52 per match)
- Attendance: 366,931 (11,836 per match)
- Top scorer: (Australia) Kerem Bulut (7 goals)
- Best player: (North Korea) Jong Il-Gwan

The 2010 AFC U-19 Championship was the 36th edition of the tournament organized by the Asian Football Confederation.

Qualification for the tournament started in October 2009 with the finals tournament being hosted in October 2010.

The AFC recommended China as the host for the 2010 AFC U-19 Championship Finals, which was subject to approval on 9 February 2010 and confirmed the hosting right's and finals venue of Zibo on 18 February 2010. The top four teams qualified for the 2011 FIFA U-20 World Cup.

== Venues ==
Zibo
Zibo Sports Center Stadium	Linzi Stadium
Capacity: 45,000	Capacity: 14,000
2010 AFC U-19 Championship is located in China

== Qualification Competition ==
=== Qualifiers ===
- Australia
- Bahrain
- China
- Iraq
- Iran
- Japan
- Jordan
- North Korea
- South Korea
- Saudi Arabia
- Syria
- Thailand
- United Arab Emirates
- Uzbekistan
- Vietnam
- Yemen

== Draw ==
The draw for the AFC U-19 Championship 2010 was held on 9 May 2010 in Zibo, China.

Pot 1 (Host & Seeds)	Pot 2	Pot 3	Pot 4
China; United Arab Emirates; Uzbekistan; South Korea	Australia; North Korea; Saudi Arabia; Japan	Iran; Thailand; Iraq; Jordan	Syria; Yemen; Vietnam; Bahrain

== Group stage ==
All times are China Standard Time (CST) - UTC+08:00.

=== Group A ===
Team	Pld	W	D	L	GF	GA	GD	Pts
China	3	2	1	0	6	2	+4	7
Saudi Arabia	3	2	0	1	3	3	0	6
Syria	3	1	0	2	1	3	−2	3
Thailand	3	0	1	2	1	3	−2	1

3 October 2010
14:30

China	3–1	Saudi Arabia
Tan Tiancheng 3'; Wu Lei 14', 65'	Report	Majrashi 9'

Zibo Sports Stadium, Zibo
Attendance: 31,000
Referee: Peter Green (Australia)

3 October 2010
17:30

Thailand	0–1	Syria
	Report	Kalaji 71'

Zibo Sports Stadium, Zibo
Attendance: 20,100
Referee: Masaaki Toma (Japan)

5 October 2010
14:30

Syria	0–2	China
	Report	Jin Jingdao 4', 90+4'

Zibo Sports Stadium, Zibo
Attendance: 23,000
Referee: Abdul Malik Abdul Bashir (Singapore)

5 October 2010
17:30

Saudi Arabia	1–0	Thailand
Dagriri 83'	Report

Zibo Sports Stadium, Zibo
Attendance: 5,000
Referee: Kim Sang-Woo (South Korea)

7 October 2010
14:30

China	1–1	Thailand
Zhu Jianrong 75'	Report	Pattana 35'

Zibo Sports Stadium, Zibo
Attendance: 23,000
Referee: Abdullah Al Hilali (Oman)

7 October 2010
14:30

Syria	0–1	Saudi Arabia
	Report	Al-Fahmi 41'

Linzi Stadium, Linzi
Attendance: 10,315
Referee: Mohsen Torky (Iran)

=== Group B ===
Team	Pld	W	D	L	GF	GA	GD	Pts
Uzbekistan	3	3	0	0	4	0	+4	9
North Korea	3	2	0	1	5	1	+4	6
Bahrain	3	1	0	2	2	4	−2	3
Iraq	3	0	0	3	1	7	−6	0

3 October 2010
14:30

Uzbekistan	1–0	North Korea
Abdukholiqov 64' (pen.)	Report

Linzi Stadium, Linzi
Attendance: 10,112
Referee: Abdulrahman Abdou (Qatar)

3 October 2010
17:30

Iraq	1–2	Bahrain
Sabah 44'	Report	Al Amer 50'; Bahjat 56' (o.g.)

Linzi Stadium, Linzi
Attendance: 8,230
Referee: Tan Hai (China)

5 October 2010
14:30

North Korea	3–0	Iraq
Jang Kuk-chol 14'; Jang Song-hyok 45' (pen.); Pak Song-Chol 90+4'	Report

Linzi Stadium, Linzi
Attendance: 8,120
Referee: Mohamed Al-Zarouni (United Arab Emirates)

5 October 2010
17:30

Bahrain	0–1	Uzbekistan
	Report	Smolyachenko 17'

Linzi Stadium, Linzi
Attendance: 7,865
Referee: Võ Minh Trí (Vietnam)

7 October 2010
17:30

Uzbekistan	2–0	Iraq
Bakhritdinov 45'; Mirzayev 90'	Report

Zibo Sports Stadium, Zibo
Attendance: 3,000
Referee: Masaaki Toma (Japan)

7 October 2010
17:30

Bahrain	0–2	North Korea
	Report	Ri Hyong-jin 56'; Pak Song-Chol 77'

Linzi Stadium, Linzi
Attendance: 11,270
Referee: Abdul Malik Abdul Bashir (Singapore)

=== Group C ===
Team	Pld	W	D	L	GF	GA	GD	Pts
Japan	3	3	0	0	9	1	+8	9
United Arab Emirates	3	1	1	1	5	2	+3	4
Vietnam	3	1	0	2	2	9	−7	3
Jordan	3	0	1	2	1	5	−4	1

4 October 2010
14:30

United Arab Emirates	1–2	Japan
Khalil 90'	Report	Rashid 53' (o.g.); Ibusuki 90+1'

Zibo Sports Stadium, Zibo
Attendance: 5,000
Referee: Mohsen Torky (Iran)

4 October 2010
17:30

Vietnam	2–1	Jordan
Lê Quốc Phương 55'; Sariweh 72' (o.g.)	Report	Za'tara 37'

Zibo Sports Stadium, Zibo
Attendance: 9,800
Referee: Liu Kwok Man (Hong Kong)

6 October 2010
14:30

Japan	4–0	Vietnam
Musaka 8'; Usami 45', 77', 90'	Report

Zibo Sports Stadium, Zibo
Attendance: 8,000
Referee: Andre El Haddad (Lebanon)

6 October 2010
17:30

Jordan	0–0	United Arab Emirates
	Report

Zibo Sports Stadium, Zibo
Attendance: 2,000
Referee: Peter Green (Australia)

8 October 2010
14:30

United Arab Emirates	4–0	Vietnam
Khalil 6', 23', 27'; Abdulrahman 77' (pen.)	Report

Zibo Sports Stadium, Zibo
Attendance: 20,000
Referee: Kim Sang-Woo (South Korea)

8 October 2010
14:30

Jordan	0–3	Japan
	Report	Nagai 49', 83'; Ibusuki 76'

Linzi Stadium, Linzi
Attendance: 4,728
Referee: Liu Kwok Man (Hong Kong)

=== Group D ===
Team	Pld	W	D	L	GF	GA	GD	Pts
Australia	3	2	1	0	7	1	+6	7
South Korea	3	2	1	0	3	0	+3	7
Iran	3	1	0	2	2	5	−3	3
Yemen	3	0	0	3	1	7	−6	0

4 October 2010
14:30

South Korea	2–0	Iran
Ji Dong-won 39'; Jung Seung-yong 54'	Report

Linzi Stadium, Linzi
Attendance: 9,280
Referee: Andre El Haddad (Lebanon)

4 October 2010
17:30

Australia	4–1	Yemen
Danning 14'; Bulut 26' (pen.); McGowan 30'; Fletcher 83'	Report	Al-Baidhani 2'

Linzi Stadium, Linzi
Attendance: 8,432
Referee: Abdullah Al Hilali (Oman)

6 October 2010
14:30

Iran	0–3	Australia
	Report	Amini 39'; Bulut 60'; Antonis 88'

Linzi Stadium, Linzi
Attendance: 8,761
Referee: Tan Hai (China)

6 October 2010
17:30

Yemen	0–1	South Korea
	Report	Ji Dong-won 15'

Linzi Stadium, Linzi
Attendance: 9,037
Referee: Abdulrahman Abdou (Qatar)

8 October 2010
17:30

South Korea	0–0	Australia
	Report

Zibo Sports Stadium, Zibo
Attendance: 15,000
Referee: Mohamed Al-Zarouni (United Arab Emirates)

8 October 2010
17:30

Yemen	0–2	Iran
	Report	Rezaei 59', 88' (pen.)

Linzi Stadium, Linzi
Attendance: 6,746
Referee: Võ Minh Trí (Vietnam)

== Knockout stages ==
All times are China Standard Time (CST) - UTC+08:00.

=== Knockout Map ===
Quarter-finals
11 October - Zibo
China	0
North Korea	2
11 October - Linzi
Japan	2
South Korea	3
11 October - Zibo
Uzbekistan	1
Saudi Arabia	2(a.e.t.)
11 October - Linzi
Australia	4(a.e.t.)
United Arab Emirates	2

Semi-finals
14 October - Zibo
North Korea	2
South Korea	0
14 October - Zibo
Saudi Arabia	0
Australia	2

Final
17 October - Zibo
North Korea	3
Australia	2

=== Quarter-finals ===
11 October 2010
14:30

China	0–2	North Korea
	Report	Jong Il-gwan 51'; Pak Song-Chol 53'

Zibo Sports Stadium, Zibo
Attendance: 30,000
Referee: Andre El Haddad (Lebanon)

11 October 2010
18:00

Uzbekistan	1–2 (a.e.t.)	Saudi Arabia
Abdullayev 6'	Report	Otayf 83'; Al-Johani 96'

Zibo Sports Stadium, Zibo
Attendance: 5,000
Referee: Mohsen Torky (Iran)

11 October 2010
14:30

Japan	2–3	South Korea
Ibusuki 14', 30' (pen.)	Report	Kim Kyung-jung 31'; Hwang Do-yeon 45'; Jung Seung-yong 45+2'

Linzi Stadium, Linzi
Attendance: 3,560
Referee: Abdullah Al Hilali (Oman)

11 October 2010
18:00

Australia	4–2 (a.e.t.)	United Arab Emirates
Bulut 6'; Amini 48'; Leckie 92'; Fletcher 104'	Report	Khalil 23' (pen.), 84'

Linzi Stadium, Linzi
Attendance: 9,000
Referee: Abdul Malik Abdul Bashir (Singapore)

=== Semi-finals ===
14 October 2010
19:30

North Korea	2–0	South Korea
Jong Il-gwan 45'; Ri Hyok-chol 79'	Report

Zibo Sports Stadium, Zibo
Attendance: 15,000
Referee: Abdulrahman Abdou (Qatar)

14 October 2010
16:30

Saudi Arabia	0–2	Australia
	Report	Bulut 69', 74' (pen.)

Linzi Stadium, Linzi
Attendance: 5,430
Referee: Masaaki Toma (Japan)

=== Final ===
17 October 2010
19:30

North Korea	3–2	Australia
Jong Il-gwan 10', 43', 89'	Report	Bulut 24', 30'

Zibo Sports Stadium, Zibo
Attendance: 31,145
Referee: Tan Hai (China)

== Winners ==
2010 AFC Youth Championship winners

North Korea
Third title

== Awards ==
Most Valuable Player	Top Scorer
(North Korea) Jong Il-gwan	(Australia) Kerem Bulut

== Goalscorers ==
7 goals

- (Australia) Kerem Bulut

6 goals

- (United Arab Emirates) Ahmed Khalil

5 goals

- (North Korea) Jong Il-gwan

4 goals

- (Japan) Hiroshi Ibusuki

3 goals

- (Japan) Takashi Usami
- (North Korea) Pak Song-Chol

2 goals

- (Australia) Matthew Fletcher
- (Australia) Mustafa Amini
- (China) Jin Jingdao
- (China) Wu Lei
- (Iran) Kaveh Rezaei
- (Japan) Ryo Nagai
- (South Korea) Ji Dong-won
- (South Korea) Jung Seung-yong

1 goal

- (Australia) Mathew Leckie
- (Australia) Kofi Danning
- (Australia) Dylan McGowan
- (Australia) Terry Antonis
- (Bahrain) Saad Al Amer
- (China) Tan Tiancheng
- (China) Zhu Jianrong
- (Iraq) Ali Abas
- (Japan) Mitsunari Musaka
- (Jordan) Mahmoud Za'tara
- (North Korea) Jang Kuk-chol
- (North Korea) Jang Song-hyok
- (North Korea) Ri Hyong-jin
- (North Korea) Ri Hyok-chol
- (Saudi Arabia) Mohammed Majrashi
- (Saudi Arabia) Yahya Dagriri
- (Saudi Arabia) Yasser Al-Fahmi
- (Saudi Arabia) Abdullah Otayf
- (Saudi Arabia) Fahad Al-Johani
- (South Korea) Hwang Do-yeon
- (South Korea) Kim Kyung-jung
- (Syria) Radwan Kalaji
- (Thailand) Sokjono Pattana
- (Uzbekistan) Temurkhuja Abdukholiqov
- (United Arab Emirates) Omar Abdulrahman
- (Uzbekistan) Abdumutallib Abdullayev
- (Uzbekistan) Akram Bahritdinov
- (Uzbekistan) Sardor Mirzaev
- (Uzbekistan) Pavel Smolyachenko
- (Vietnam) Lê Quốc Phương
- (Yemen) Ahmed Al-Baidhani

1 own goal

- (Iraq) Ali Bahjat (playing against Bahrain)
- (Jordan) Abdel-Aziz Saraweh (playing against Vietnam)
- (United Arab Emirates) Adan Rashid (playing against Japan)

== Countries to participate in 2011 FIFA U-20 World Cup ==
Top-4 team qualified for 2011 FIFA U-20 World Cup.

- Australia
- North Korea
- South Korea
- Saudi Arabia
