= 2010 AFC U-19 Championship qualification =

Tournament details
- Teams: 42 (from 1 confederation)

The Qualification Competition for the 2010 AFC U-19 Championship.

== The Draw ==
The draw for the 2010 AFC U-19 Championship (Qualifiers) will take place at AFC House on 20 February 2009.

A total of 42 teams will come out of the pots. In the West Zone, there are 24 teams, while the East Zone will comprise 18 teams.

There will be four groups of six teams each in the West Zone and the East will comprise three groups of six teams each.

== Qualification ==
The winner and runners-up of each group qualifies for the 2010 AFC U-19 Championship (Finals). One best third-placed team from the West Zone and one best third-placed team from the East also qualify for the Finals.

== Seedings ==
=== West Asia ===
(Ranked 1st to 22nd)

1. United Arab Emirates
2. Uzbekistan
3. Saudi Arabia
4. Tajikistan
5. Iran
6. Iraq
7. Jordan
8. Syria
9. Lebanon (W)
10. Yemen
11. Qatar
12. Oman
13. Kuwait
14. Turkmenistan (W)
15. Nepal
16. Bahrain
17. Maldives (W)
18. India
19. Palestine
20. Bhutan (W)
21. Pakistan
22. Afghanistan
22. Kyrgyzstan
22. Sri Lanka

=== East Asia ===
(Ranked 1st to 16th)

1. South Korea
2. Australia
3. China
4. North Korea
5. Japan
6. Thailand
7. Indonesia
8. Malaysia
9. Laos
10. Singapore
11. Vietnam
12. Myanmar
13. Macau
14. Guam
15. Chinese Taipei
16. Bangladesh
16. Hong Kong
16. Philippines

=== Notes ===
- Brunei and Cambodia and Timor-Leste and Mongolia – Did not enter
- Maldives – Withdrew
- Bhutan – withdrew
- Turkmenistan – withdrew
- Lebanon – withdrew

== Matches ==
=== Group A ===
All matches were held in Kathmandu, Nepal (UTC+5:45).

Team	Pld	W	D	L	GF	GA	GD	Pts
Jordan	5	4	1	0	12	6	+6	13
Yemen	5	3	2	0	13	5	+8	11
Tajikistan	5	3	0	2	9	6	+3	9
Palestine	5	1	1	3	7	11	−4	4
Nepal (H)	5	1	0	4	6	13	−7	3
Kyrgyzstan	5	1	0	4	5	11	−6	3

25 October 2009
12:00

Tajikistan	4–0	Kyrgyzstan
	Report

Dashrath Stadium, Kathmandu
Attendance: 500
Referee: Vladislav Tseytlin (Uzbekistan)

25 October 2009
14:00

Jordan	3–1	Palestine
	Report

Halchowk Stadium, Kathmandu
Attendance: 180
Referee: Balideh Abdullah (Qatar)

25 October 2009
14:30

Yemen	3–0	Nepal
	Report

Dashrath Stadium, Kathmandu

27 October 2009
12:00

Jordan	2–2	Yemen
	Report

Dashrath Stadium, Kathmandu

27 October 2009
14:00

Palestine	0–3	Tajikistan
	Report

Halchowk Stadium, Kathmandu

27 October 2009
14:30

Nepal	2–1	Kyrgyzstan
	Report

Dashrath Stadium, Kathmandu

29 October 2009
12:00

Palestine	2–2	Yemen
	Report

Dashrath Stadium, Kathmandu

29 October 2009
14:00

Kyrgyzstan	1–2	Jordan
	Report

Halchowk Stadium, Kathmandu

29 October 2009
14:30

Tajikistan	2–1	Nepal
	Report

Dashrath Stadium, Kathmandu

1 November 2009
12:00

Kyrgyzstan	2–0	Palestine
	Report

Dashrath Stadium, Kathmandu

1 November 2009
14:00

Yemen	3–0	Tajikistan
	Report

Halchowk Stadium, Kathmandu

1 November 2009
14:30

Nepal	2–3	Jordan
	Report

Dashrath Stadium, Kathmandu

4 November 2009
12:00

Tajikistan	0–2	Jordan
	Report

Dashrath Stadium, Kathmandu

4 November 2009
14:00

Kyrgyzstan	1–3	Yemen
	Report

Halchowk Stadium, Kathmandu

4 November 2009
14:30

Palestine	4–1	Nepal
	Report

Dashrath Stadium, Kathmandu

=== Group B ===
All matches in Al Ain, United Arab Emirates

Team	Pld	W	D	L	GF	GA	GD	Pts
United Arab Emirates (H)	4	4	0	0	13	4	+9	12
Syria	4	2	1	1	8	4	+4	7
Bahrain	4	2	0	2	7	7	0	6
Qatar	4	1	1	2	11	5	+6	4
Sri Lanka	4	0	0	4	0	19	−19	0
Bhutan (W)	0	–	–	–	–	–	—	0

(W) Withdrew
1 November 2009
16:50 UTC+4

Qatar	1–1	Syria
	Report

Al Qatara Stadium, Al Ain

1 November 2009
19:30 UTC+4

Sri Lanka	0–4	Bahrain
	Report

Al Qatara Stadium, Al Ain

3 November 2009
16:50 UTC+4

Bahrain	1–4	United Arab Emirates
	Report

Al Qatara Stadium, Al Ain

3 November 2009
19:30 UTC+4

Sri Lanka	0–8	Qatar
	Report

Al Qatara Stadium, Al Ain

6 November 2009
16:50 UTC+4

United Arab Emirates	4–0	Sri Lanka
	Report

Al Qatara Stadium, Al Ain

6 November 2009
19:30 UTC+4

Syria	3–1	Bahrain
	Report

Al Qatara Stadium, Al Ain

8 November 2009
16:50 UTC+4

Syria	3–0	Sri Lanka
	Report

Al Qatara Stadium, Al Ain

8 November 2009
19:30 UTC+4

Qatar	2–3	United Arab Emirates
	Report

Al Qatara Stadium, Al Ain

10 November 2009
16:50 UTC+4

Bahrain	1–0	Qatar
	Report

Al Qatara Stadium, Al Ain

10 November 2009
19:30 UTC+4

United Arab Emirates	2–1	Syria
	Report

Al Qatara Stadium, Al Ain

=== Group C ===
All Matches in Iraq

Team	Pld	W	D	L	GF	GA	GD	Pts
Iraq (H)	5	4	1	0	13	0	+13	13
Saudi Arabia	5	3	1	1	9	5	+4	10
Oman	5	2	2	1	9	6	+3	8
India	5	2	0	3	11	13	−2	6
Kuwait	5	1	2	2	5	6	−1	5
Afghanistan	5	0	0	5	3	20	−17	0

5 November 2009
13:00 UTC+3

Saudi Arabia	5–1	Afghanistan
	Report

Franso Hariri Stadium, Arbil

5 November 2009
16:00 UTC+3

Iraq	5–0	India
	Report

Franso Hariri Stadium, Arbil

5 November 2009
19:00 UTC+3

Oman	1–1	Kuwait
	Report

Franso Hariri Stadium, Arbil

7 November 2009
13:00 UTC+3

Iraq	2–0	Oman
	Report

Franso Hariri Stadium, Arbil

7 November 2009
16:00 UTC+3

Kuwait	4–1	Afghanistan
	Report

Franso Hariri Stadium, Arbil

7 November 2009
19:00 UTC+3

India	1–3	Saudi Arabia
	Report

Franso Hariri Stadium, Arbil

10 November 2009
13:00 UTC+3

India	3–4	Oman
	Report

Franso Hariri Stadium, Arbil

10 November 2009
16:00 UTC+3

Saudi Arabia	1–0	Kuwait
	Report

Franso Hariri Stadium, Arbil

10 November 2009
19:00 UTC+3

Afghanistan	0–3	Iraq
	Report

Franso Hariri Stadium, Arbil

12 November 2009
13:00 UTC+3

Kuwait	0–0	Iraq
	Report

Franso Hariri Stadium, Arbil

12 November 2009
16:00 UTC+3

Afghanistan	1–4	India
	Report

Franso Hariri Stadium, Arbil

12 November 2009
19:00 UTC+3

Oman	0–0	Saudi Arabia
	Report

Franso Hariri Stadium, Arbil

15 November 2009
13:00 UTC+3

Saudi Arabia	0–3	Iraq
	Report

Franso Hariri Stadium, Arbil

15 November 2009
16:00 UTC+3

Afghanistan	0–4	Oman
	Report

Franso Hariri Stadium, Arbil

15 November 2009
19:00 UTC+3

India	3–0	Kuwait
	Report

Franso Hariri Stadium, Arbil

=== Group D ===
All matches in Iran. Pakistan were stripped of the hosting rights

Team	Pld	W	D	L	GF	GA	GD	Pts
Uzbekistan	2	1	1	0	6	1	+5	4
Iran (H)	2	1	1	0	5	1	+4	4
Pakistan	2	0	0	2	0	9	−9	0
Turkmenistan (W)	0	–	–	–	–	–	—	0
Lebanon (W)	0	–	–	–	–	–	—	0
Maldives (W)	0	–	–	–	–	–	—	0

(W) Withdrew
8 December 2009
14:30 UTC+3:30

Iran	4–0	Pakistan
	Report

Takhti Stadium, Tehran

10 December 2009
14:30 UTC+3:30

Pakistan	0–5	Uzbekistan
	Report

Takhti Stadium, Tehran

12 December 2009
14:30 UTC+3:30

Uzbekistan	1–1	Iran
	Report

Takhti Stadium, Tehran

=== Group E ===
All matches in Thailand

Team	Pld	W	D	L	GF	GA	GD	Pts
South Korea	5	4	0	1	18	3	+15	12 (Note: Thailand and Korea have one more goal than Vietnam in the matches between Vietnam, Thailand, Korea Republic.)
Thailand (H)	5	4	0	1	9	2	+7	12
Vietnam (Note: Vietnam is the best third-placed team from the East zone.)	5	4	0	1	9	2	+7	12
Bangladesh	5	1	1	3	6	14	−8	4
Macau	5	1	0	4	7	17	−10	3
Laos	5	0	1	4	7	18	−11	1

Notes:
1 November 2009
16:30 UTC+7

South Korea	5–0	Bangladesh
	Report

Thai Army Sports Stadium, Bangkok

1 November 2009
16:30 UTC+7

Laos	1–4	Vietnam
	Report

Thai-Japanese Stadium, Bangkok

1 November 2009
19:00 UTC+7

Thailand	3–0	Macau
	Report

Thai Army Sports Stadium, Bangkok

3 November 2009
16:30 UTC+7

Thailand	1–0	Laos
	Report

Thai Army Sports Stadium, Bangkok

3 November 2009
16:30 UTC+7

Macau	1–5	South Korea
	Report

Thai-Japanese Stadium, Bangkok

3 November 2009
19:00 UTC+7

Vietnam	1–0	Bangladesh
	Report

Thai Army Sports Stadium, Bangkok

6 November 2009
16:30 UTC+7

Macau	4–3	Laos
	Report

Thai Army Sports Stadium, Bangkok

6 November 2009
16:30 UTC+7

Bangladesh	0–3	Thailand
	Report

Thai-Japanese Stadium, Bangkok

6 November 2009
19:00 UTC+7

South Korea	0–1	Vietnam
	Report

Thai Army Sports Stadium, Bangkok

8 November 2009
16:30 UTC+7

Vietnam	0–1	Thailand
	Report

Thai Army Sports Stadium, Bangkok

8 November 2009
16:30 UTC+7

Laos	0–6	South Korea
	Report

Thai-Japanese Stadium, Bangkok

8 November 2009
19:00 UTC+7

Bangladesh	3–2	Macau
	Report

Thai Army Sports Stadium, Bangkok

11 November 2009
16:30 UTC+7

South Korea	2–1	Thailand
	Report

Thai Army Sports Stadium, Bangkok

11 November 2009
16:30 UTC+7

Macau	0–3	Vietnam
	Report

Thai-Japanese Stadium, Bangkok

11 November 2009
19:00 UTC+7

Bangladesh	3–3	Laos
	Report

Thai Army Sports Stadium, Bangkok

=== Group F ===
All matches in Bandung, Indonesia

Team	Pld	W	D	L	GF	GA	GD	Pts
Japan	5	5	0	0	19	2	+17	15
Australia	5	3	1	1	17	4	+13	10
Indonesia (H)	5	2	1	2	10	9	+1	7
Hong Kong	5	2	0	3	7	13	−6	6
Singapore	5	2	0	3	5	13	−8	6
Chinese Taipei	5	0	0	5	3	20	−17	0

7 November 2009
15:00 UTC+7

Indonesia	0–1	Singapore
	Report

Si Jalak Harupat Stadium, Bandung

7 November 2009
18:00 UTC+7

Japan	4–0	Chinese Taipei
	Report

Si Jalak Harupat Stadium, Bandung

7 November 2009
21:00 UTC+7

Australia	3–1	Hong Kong
	Report

Si Jalak Harupat Stadium, Bandung

9 November 2009
15:00 UTC+7

Japan	7–0	Indonesia
	Report

Si Jalak Harupat Stadium, Bandung

9 November 2009
18:00 UTC+7

Singapore	1–2	Hong Kong
	Report

Si Jalak Harupat Stadium, Bandung

9 November 2009
21:00 UTC+7

Chinese Taipei	0–4	Australia
	Report

Si Jalak Harupat Stadium, Bandung

12 November 2009
15:00 UTC+7

Chinese Taipei	0–6	Indonesia
	Report

Si Jalak Harupat Stadium, Bandung

12 November 2009
18:00 UTC+7

Australia	8–0	Singapore
	Report

Si Jalak Harupat Stadium, Bandung

12 November 2009
21:00 UTC+7

Hong Kong	0–3	Japan
	Report

Si Jalak Harupat Stadium, Bandung

14 November 2009
15:00 UTC+7

Singapore	0–2	Japan
	Report

Si Jalak Harupat Stadium, Bandung

14 November 2009
18:00 UTC+7

Hong Kong	3–2	Chinese Taipei
	Report

Si Jalak Harupat Stadium, Bandung

14 November 2009
21:00 UTC+7

Indonesia	0–0	Australia
	Report

Si Jalak Harupat Stadium, Bandung

17 November 2009
15:00 UTC+7

Australia	2–3	Japan
	Report

Si Jalak Harupat Stadium, Bandung

17 November 2009
18:00 UTC+7

Hong Kong	1–4	Indonesia
	Report

Si Jalak Harupat Stadium, Bandung

17 November 2009
21:00 UTC+7

Chinese Taipei	1–3	Singapore
	Report

Si Jalak Harupat Stadium, Bandung

=== Group G ===
All matches in Zibo, China PR

Team	Pld	W	D	L	GF	GA	GD	Pts
China (H)	5	5	0	0	29	1	+28	15
North Korea	5	4	0	1	25	5	+20	12
Malaysia	5	3	0	2	19	7	+12	9
Myanmar	5	2	0	3	9	12	−3	6
Guam	5	0	1	4	5	33	−28	1
Philippines	5	0	1	4	4	33	−29	1

1 November 2009
15:00 UTC+8

China	13–0	Philippines
	Report

Linzi Stadium, Zibo

1 November 2009
15:00 UTC+8

North Korea	11–1	Guam
	Report

Sports Centre, Zibo

1 November 2009
19:00 UTC+8

Malaysia	4–0	Myanmar
	Report

Sports Centre, Zibo

3 November 2009
15:00 UTC+8

North Korea	2–1	Malaysia
	Report

Linzi Stadium, Zibo

3 November 2009
16:05 UTC+8

Guam	0–8	China
	Report

Sports Centre, Zibo

3 November 2009
19:30 UTC+8

Myanmar	6–0	Philippines
	Report

Sports Centre, Zibo

6 November 2009
15:00 UTC+8

Guam	0–9	Malaysia
	Report

Linzi Stadium, Zibo

6 November 2009
16:05 UTC+8

China	2–0	Myanmar
	Report

Sports Centre, Zibo

6 November 2009
19:30 UTC+8

Philippines	0–8	North Korea
	Report

Sports Centre, Zibo

8 November 2009
15:00 UTC+8

Myanmar	0–4	North Korea
	Report

Linzi Stadium, Zibo

8 November 2009
15:00 UTC+8

Philippines	2–2	Guam
	Report

Sports Centre, Zibo

8 November 2009
19:30 UTC+8

Malaysia	1–3	China
	Report

Sports Centre, Zibo

11 November 2009
15:00 UTC+8

Philippines	2–4	Malaysia
	Report

Linzi Stadium, Zibo

11 November 2009
15:00 UTC+8

Guam	2–3	Myanmar
	Report

Sports Centre, Zibo

11 November 2009
19:30 UTC+8

China	3–0	North Korea
	Report

Sports Centre, Zibo

== Third-placed qualifiers ==
At the end of the first stage, a comparison was made between the third placed teams of each group. The one best third-placed teams from the West Zone (Group A to D) and one best third-placed team from the East (Group E to G) would also advanced to the 2010 AFC U-19 Championship.

=== West Zone ===
Because two groups has one team fewer than the others, following the withdrawal of Bhutan and the Maldives, matches against the sixth-placed team in each group are not included in this ranking. As a result, four matches played by each team will count for the purposes of the third-placed table.

Grp	Team	Pld	W	D	L	GF	GA	GD	Pts
B	Bahrain	4	2	0	2	7	7	0	6
A	Tajikistan	4	2	0	2	5	6	−1	6
C	Oman	4	1	2	1	5	6	−1	5
D	Pakistan	2	0	0	2	0	9	−9	0

=== East Zone ===
Grp	Team	Pld	W	D	L	GF	GA	GD	Pts
E	Vietnam	5	4	0	1	9	2	+7	12
G	Malaysia	5	3	0	2	19	7	+12	9
F	Indonesia	5	2	1	2	10	9	+1	7

== Qualifiers ==
- Australia
- Bahrain
- China
- Iraq
- Iran
- Japan
- Jordan
- North Korea
- South Korea
- Saudi Arabia
- Syria
- Thailand
- United Arab Emirates
- Uzbekistan
- Vietnam
- Yemen

== See also ==
- 2010 AFC U-16 Championship qualification
