= Linzi =

Linzi may refer to:

- Ancient Linzi, capital of the ancient state of Qi
- Linzi District, the modern district of Zibo, Shandong in the same location
