= Mitsunari Musaka =

Japanese footballer (born 1991)

Mitsunari Musaka 六平 光成
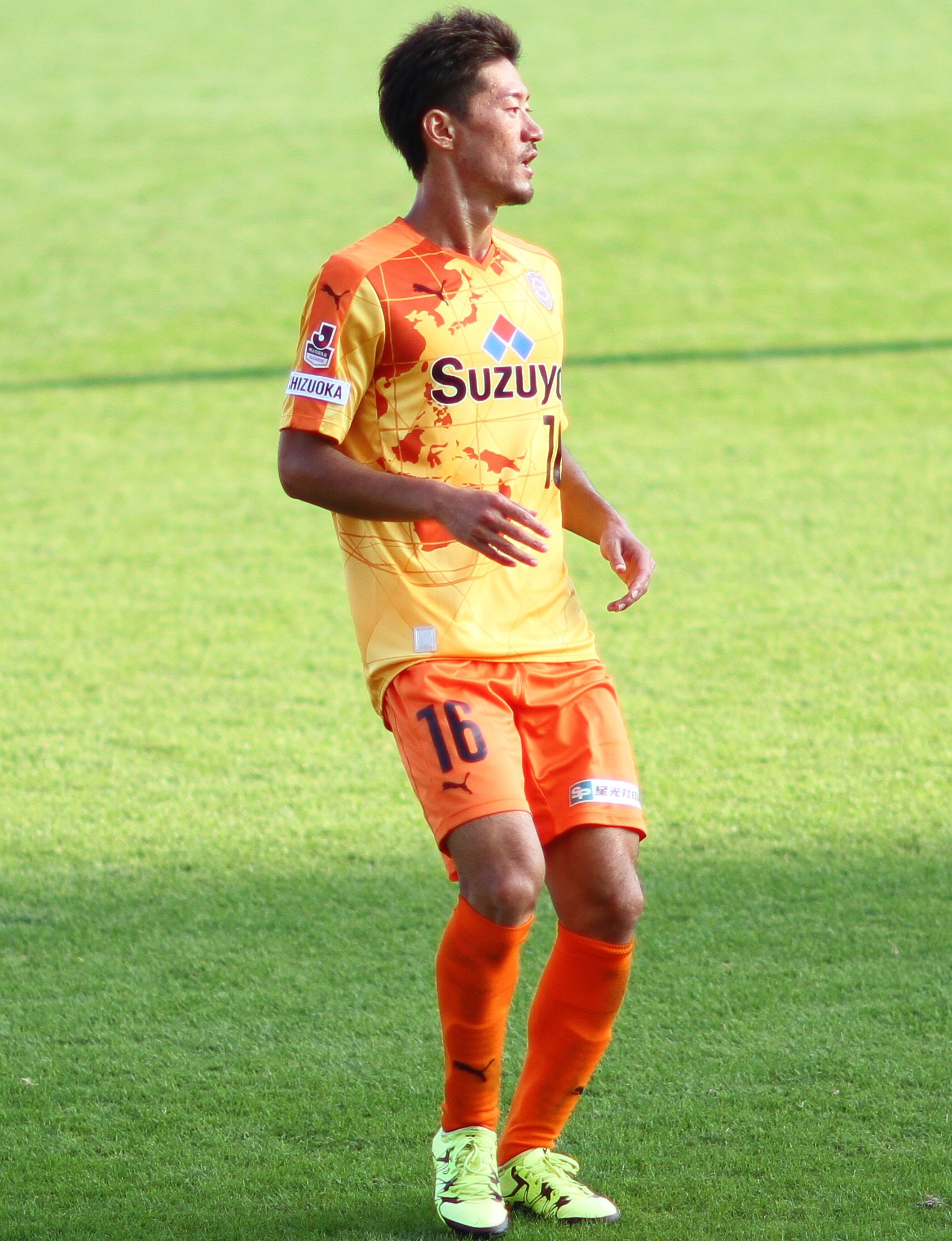

Personal information
- Date of birth: 16 January 1991 (age 35)
- Place of birth: Tokyo, Japan
- Height: 1.75 m (5 ft 9 in)
- Position: Midfielder

Youth career
- 2003–2005: FC Tokyo
- 2006–2008: Maebashi Ikuei High School

College career
Years	Team	Apps	(Gls)
2009–2012	Chuo University		

Senior career*
Years	Team	Apps	(Gls)
2013–2020	Shimizu S-Pulse	168	(1)
2021–2022	Giravanz Kitakyushu	42	(0)

International career
2009	Japan U18		
2010	Japan U19		
Medal record
Representing Japan
World University Games
Gold medal – first place	2011 Shenzhen	Men's Team
- * Club domestic league appearances and goals

Mitsunari Musaka (六平 光成, Musaka Mitsunari; born 16 January 1991) is a Japanese former professional footballer who played as a midfielder for Japanese clubs Shimizu S-Pulse and Giravanz Kitakyushu.

== Career ==
He started out playing for the FC Tokyo youth system, specifically the U-15 Shenzhen team. His team won the 2003 Japanese Club Youth U-15 Championship. He later attended and played for Maebashi Scholarship High School. With his help, the team made the semifinals of the 2008 All Japan High School Soccer Tournament. He scored 2 goals in 5 games and was named to the Tournament All-Star team. He also represented Japan in various U18 tournaments at this time, including the 2010 AFC U-19 Championship qualification. After graduating from high school, he refused J.League Division 1 offers in order to play for Chuo University.

Musaka captained Japan during the 2010 AFC U-19 Championship in China, scoring a goal and leading his team to the quarterfinals of the tournament, where they lost by a score of 3–2 to South Korea. He played in various other international youth tournaments, such as the Dallas Cup, the SBS Cup, the Sendai Cup and the Milk Cup.

In 2011, he was chosen to represent his country at the 2011 Summer Universiade. He scored two goals in the tournament and had an assist in the championship game, where Japan beat Britain 2–0 to win its 5th Universiade soccer title.

After his college graduation, he had offers from Shimizu S-Pulse, Omiya Ardija and Kashima Antlers, but on 1 January 2013, Musaka signed with Shimizu. He made his J.League Division 1 debut on 10 July against Kashima Antlers in a 3–1 loss, and scored his first goal as a professional against Kawasaki Frontale on 2 November 2014 in a 3–2 win.

== Career statistics ==
Updated to 18 February 2019.

Appearances and goals by club, season and competition
Club	Season	League			Emperor's Cup		J.League Cup		Total	
Club	Season	Division	Apps	Goals	Apps	Goals	Apps	Goals	Apps	Goals
Shimizu S-Pulse	2013	J1 League	7	0	0	0	1	0	8	0
Shimizu S-Pulse	2014	J1 League	32	1	4	0	6	0	42	1
Shimizu S-Pulse	2015	J1 League	25	0	0	0	2	0	27	0
Shimizu S-Pulse	2016	J2 League	26	0	2	0	–		28	0
Shimizu S-Pulse	2017	J1 League	25	0	2	0	3	0	30	0
Shimizu S-Pulse	2018	J1 League	0	0	0	0	2	0	2	0
Career total			115	1	8	0	14	0	137	1
