= Zuo Si =

Chinese writer and poet (250–305)

Zuo Si (Chinese: 左思; pinyin: Zuǒ Sī; 250–305), courtesy name Taichong (太沖), was a Chinese writer and poet who lived in the Western Jin dynasty.

== Biography ==
Zuo was born to an aristocratic family of Confucian scholars in Linzi. His mother died young. His father, Zuo Yong, was promoted to imperial official in charge of the imperial archives. Zuo Si would often play word games with his sister, Zuo Fen, who later became famous in her own right as a writer and a concubine of Emperor Wu of Jin, founder of Jin dynasty.

== Literary works ==
In approximately 280, Zuo wrote the "Shu Capital Rhapsody" (蜀都赋), the first of his rhapsodies on the three capitals of the Three Kingdoms period. The Shu Capital Rhapsody described the city of Chengdu and the surrounding area. This work features the earliest surviving reference to Mount Emei. The work was so highly renowned and frequently copied upon its release that the price of paper in Luoyang is said to have risen as a result. This later gave rise to the popular Chinese idiom 洛阳纸贵 ("Paper is Expensive in Luoyang"), today used to praise a literary work.

Zuo described his rhapsodies on the three capitals as derivative of similar works by Zhang Heng and Ban Gu. However, Mark Edward Lewis has written that Zuo's rhapsodies marked the end of the Han dynasty ideal of the ritually perfect capital, because they describe three simultaneously existing, contemporary capitals, suppressing the ritual and historical evolution that structured the previous works. Zuo argued for accuracy as the basis of poetry, in contrast to the fantastic writings of Han poets. In his preface to the three rhapsodies, he wrote that while writers of lyric verse "sing of what their hearts are set upon", writers of descriptive rhapsodies "praise what they observe".

Zuo's poetry, particularly his poem Summoning the Recluse, is regarded as representative of the medieval Chinese "poetry of seclusion" or "poetry of the recluse". Unlike earlier poems, which encouraged readers to leave the wilderness for the official life, Zuo advocates a return to the wilderness. Gaul and Hiltz attribute this change in perspective to the replacement of Shamanistic beliefs with Confucian ethics and Daoist religion.

== Legacy ==
Zuo Si's work has continued to resonate with later scholars. The Qing dynasty scholar Yuan Mei wrote that Zuo Si's Singing of History "uses past deeds of historical characters to express what is in one's own heart", and is an example of the first of the three types of historical verse. The Tang dynasty poet Wang Ji paid homage uses Zuo's Summoning the Recluse as a model, but departs from it by focusing on the recluse's way of life, rather than the natural surroundings. In addition, unlike Zuo, Wang does not completely abandon the pursuit of honor and glory in officialdom.
