= Zuo Fen =

Chinese female poet ( c. 255–300)

Zuo Fen 左芬
- Born: c. 255; Linzi (present-day Linzi District)
- Died: 23 April 300
- Spouse: Emperor Wu of Jin
- Father: Zuo Xi (左熹, courtesy name Yanyong (彥雍))

Zuo Fen (Chinese: 左芬, also written as "左棻"; c.255 – 23 April 300), courtesy name Lanzhi (兰芝), was a Chinese woman poet of the Western Jin dynasty.

== Life ==
Zuo Fen was born in Linzi prefecture to a family of Confucian scholars. Her mother died young, but her father, Zuo Xi, became an imperial official in charge of the imperial archives. She got a good literary education and often played word games with her brother, Zuo Si, who would become a famous writer as well.

In 272 she went to the palace and became a concubine of Emperor Wu of Jin. There she wrote the Rhapsody of Thoughts on Separation, in which she expressed frustration at being separated from her family and the rest of the world. Her expression of dissatisfaction with life at the palace, which was rare, did not make her lose favour and she was raised to the highest rank of noble concubine.

The emperor regularly commanded writings from her, but she was often ill and did not play a political role at court. When Empress Yang Yan died, she wrote a song of mourning in her honour.

Zuo Fen died in April 300.

== Sources ==
- Kang-i Sun Chang; Haun Saussy; Charles Yim-tze Kwong (1999). Women writers of traditional China: an anthology of poetry and criticism. Stanford University Press.
- Fusheng Wu (2008). Written at imperial command: panegyric poetry in early medieval China. State University of New York Press.
