= Matthew Fletcher (soccer) =

Australian footballer

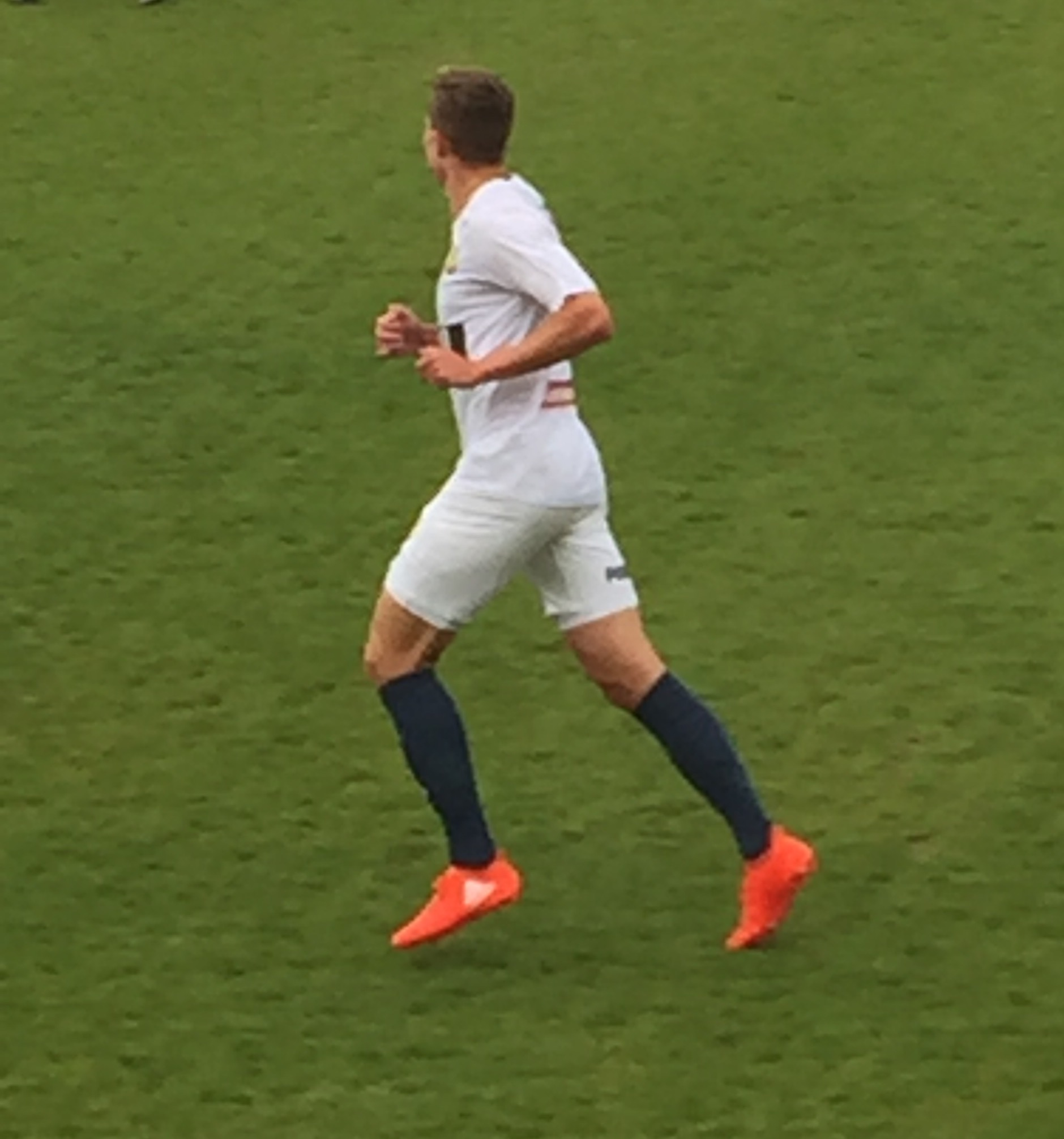
- Fletcher playing for Central Coast Mariners in 2016

Personal information
- Full name: Matthew James Fletcher
- Date of birth: 12 May 1992 (age 34)
- Place of birth: Sydney, Australia
- Height: 1.81 m (5 ft 11 in)
- Position: Forward

Team information
- Current team: Green Gully

Youth career
- Curl Curl
- 2008–2011: Sunderland
- 2011: Fulham
- 2012–2013: Sheffield Wednesday
- 2013–2014: Hull City

Senior career*
Years	Team	Apps	(Gls)
2012	Oxford United	0	(0)
2013	Sheffield Wednesday	0	(0)
2013	→ Cambridge United (loan)	2	(0)
2016–2017	Central Coast Mariners	7	(0)
2017–2018	Manly United	3	(1)
2019–	Green Gully	64	(12)

International career^{‡}
2010–2011	Australia U20	12	(2)
2011	Australia U23	1	(0)
Medal record
Representing Australia
Men's Association football
AFC U-20 Asian Cup
Runner-up	2010 China
- * Club domestic league appearances and goals as of 3 November 2022 ‡ National team caps and goals as of 27 January 2016

Matthew James Fletcher (born 12 May 1992) is an Australian footballer who plays as a forward for Green Gully in NPL Victoria.

Fletcher played professionally in the Football League in England and went on to play for Central Coast Mariners.

== Club career ==
=== Career in England ===
Born in Sydney, Australia, Fletcher started out his career in England, with Curl Curl before moving to Sunderland, where he spent three years and was released in 2011.

Following his departure from Sunderland, Fletcher signed a short-term deal with Oxford United on 11 December 2011. Fletcher and Oxford United mutually agreed to parted ways in January 2012.

After leaving Oxford United, Fletcher joined Championship side Sheffield Wednesday in the summer. In early 2013, Fletcher moved to Cambridge United on loan from Sheffield Wednesday. Fletcher made his Cambridge Unite debut the next day, where he played 76 minutes, in a 0-0 draw against Grimsby Town. After making another appearance for the club, Fletcher returned to his parent club. Upon returning to his parent club, Fletcher was released by the club.

In September 2013, Fletcher joined Hull City on a free transfer after joining the club on trial and impressed the club management when he played in a friendly match. Having been in the development squad for the whole season, Fletcher was released by the club.

=== Central Coast Mariners ===
Fletcher returned to Australia and signed for Central Coast Mariners in January 2016.

Fletcher made his Central Coast Mariners debut on 23 January 2016, where he made his first start and played 65 minutes, in a 2-1 loss against Western Sydney Wanderers. Fletcher went on to make seven appearances for the side this season. However, Fletcher struggled in the first team under the management of Paul Okon and in January 2017, he was released by the club.

=== Manly United ===
Fletcher went to join Manly United, but was injured in his third game with the club, against Blacktown City on 29 April 2017. He began coaching, starting as an assistant, and it was announced in November that Fletcher would assume the role of head coach of the under-15 boys team.

== International career ==
Fletcher was a member of the Young Socceroos squad selected for the 2011 FIFA U-20 World Cup.

Fletcher represented Australia under-23 as a substitute in a victory over Singapore on 14 June 2011.

== Personal life ==
Despite being born in Australia, Fletcher said he considered himself English.

== Honours ==
Australia U-20

- AFC U-20 Asian Cup: runner-up 2010
