= Kerem Bulut =

Australian professional football player

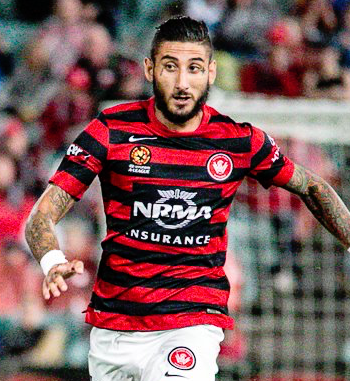
- Bulut playing for Western Sydney Wanderers in 2015

Personal information
- Date of birth: 3 February 1992 (age 34)
- Place of birth: Auburn, New South Wales, Australia
- Height: 1.86 m (6 ft 1 in)
- Positions: Striker; winger

Youth career
- 2007–2008: NSWIS
- 2008–2009: Sydney FC
- 2009: AIS
- 2009–2010: Sydney FC
- 2010–2012: Mladá Boleslav

Senior career*
Years	Team	Apps	(Gls)
2010–2013	Mladá Boleslav	23	(2)
2013–2014	Akhisar Belediyespor	12	(0)
2013–2014	→ Karşıyaka (loan)	10	(0)
2015	Western Sydney Wanderers	9	(5)
2015–2016	Iraklis	17	(1)
2016	Western Sydney Wanderers	6	(0)
2017	SV Wehen Wiesbaden	5	(0)
2017–2018	Menemen Belediyespor	30	(9)

International career^{‡}
2008–2009	Australia U17	5	(5)
2010–2011	Australia U20	14	(10)
2012	Australia U23	2	(0)
Medal record
Representing Australia
Men's Association football
AFC U-20 Asian Cup
Runner-up	2010 China
- * Club domestic league appearances and goals as of 02:54, 20 April 2017 (UTC) ‡ National team caps and goals as of 27 January 2012

Kerem Bulut (born 3 February 1992) is an Australian professional soccer player. Bulut represented the Australia under-20 national team at the 2010 AFC U-19 Championship, where he scored seven goals in six games to win the Golden Boot as Australia finished second at the tournament, he also played at the 2011 FIFA U-20 World Cup in Colombia, where Australia were eliminated at the group stages.

== Early life and personal life ==
Kerem Bulut was born on 3 February 1992 in Auburn, New South Wales to Turkish parents, Suleyman Bulut and Songul Soylemez. His father spent time in prison during his upbringing and later married his stepmother, Nicola Papadopoulos. He has a younger brother and a younger sister named Melike, who owns a coffee shop in Auburn with his friend. Bulut attended Granville Public School and Granville Boys High School, before graduating from Westfields Sports High School. He started playing football at the age of five at Mona Park in Auburn.

During his senior career, Bulut was represented by Khoder Nasser and mentored by Sonny Bill Williams. Although born in Auburn, court documents suggest that Bulut resided with his grandmother in Rockdale.

== Club career ==
=== Early career ===
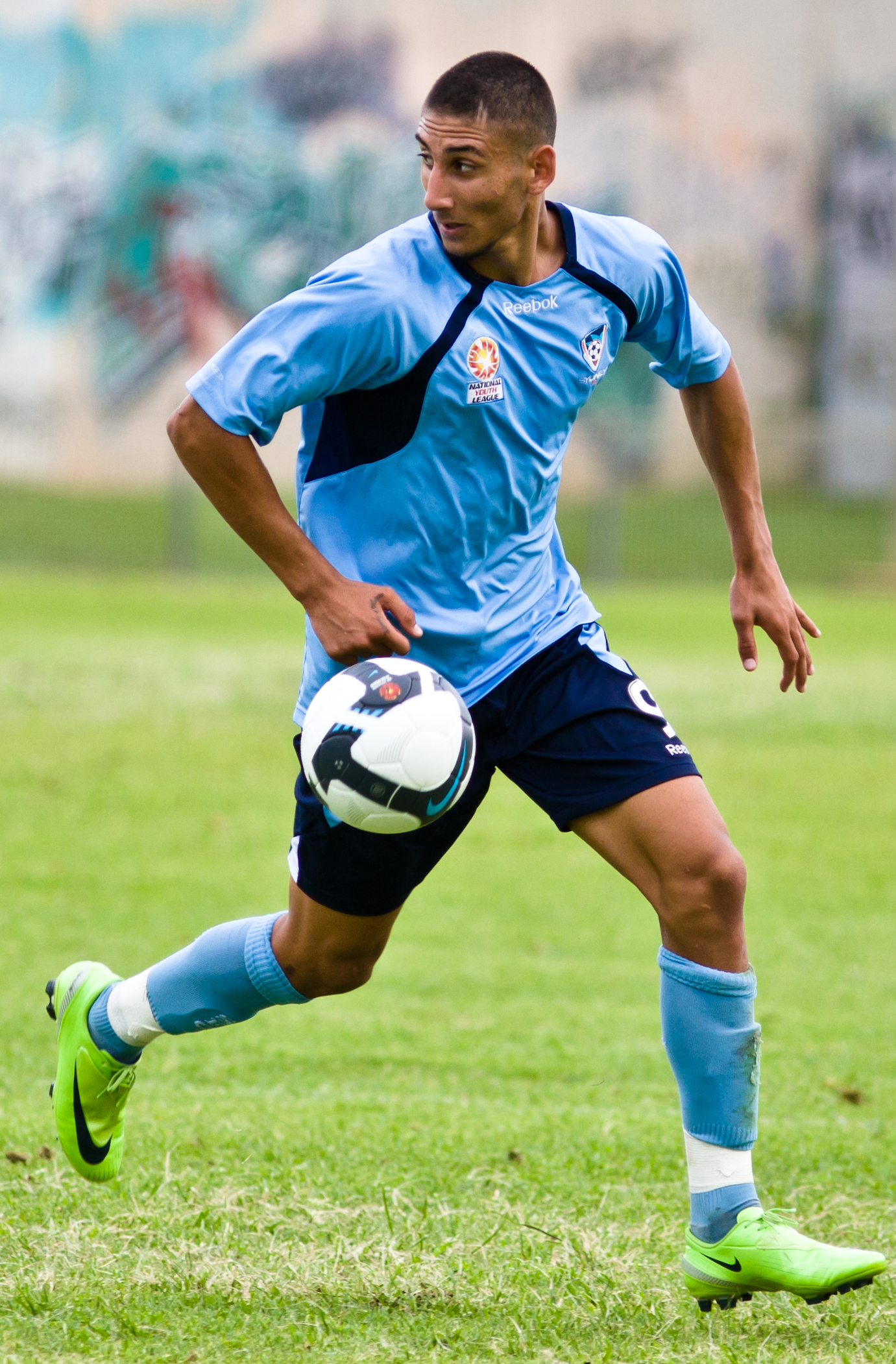
Bulut playing for the Sydney FC youth team in 2010

Bulut was signed to the youth team of Sydney FC from NSWIS in 2008 for the 2008–09 A-League National Youth League scoring his first goal in a 2–1 win against Adelaide United on 11 October 2008. Bulut would only score three goals in the season before spending 2009 with the AIS. Bulut returned to Sydney for the 2009–10 A-League National Youth League season. He was immediately picked up as one of the brightest and most talented players in Australia, and it was rumored early on that he would either be signed by Sydney FC to the first-team, but was also linked with clubs in Spain and Turkey. He scored 13 goals in 27 appearances for the Youth Team, but Sydney failed to reach the finals. He immediately went on trial with several clubs in Europe, including FK Mladá Boleslav after recommendations from Sydney FC senior manager Vítězslav Lavička.

=== Mladá Boleslav ===
After being on trial for numerous weeks with Mladá Boleslav, it was confirmed by the Czech club that they had signed Bulut. Bulut had signed a contract with the club until 30 June 2012. Signed to the club's first-team, he became one of four teen-aged players and one of five foreigners in the 25-man squad. Immediately thrown into the squad's first 11, he debuted on 18 July 2010 by starting in a 2–0 victory against Ústí nad Labem. On 24 July 2010 he again started in a 1–1 draw against České Budějovice. Two league rounds later he scored his first goal in Gambrinus liga in a home match against Příbram. Due to his criminal charge he was absent from the club from October 2010 to April 2011 where his first game back was in a 3–1 loss to Viktoria Plzeň on 8 May. Bulut was part of the Mladá Boleslav squad which won the 2010–11 Czech Cup, beating Sigma Olomouc in the final having won 4–3 on penalties after a 1–1 draw.

On his 2011–12 season debut on 14 August, he scored Mladá Boleslav's second goal in a 4–1 away win to Baník Ostrava. On 6 January 2012, it was reported that Mladá Boleslav agreed to release Bulut from his contract to allow him to move to Turkish Süper Lig club Eskişehirspor, who had offered him a six-month deal with the option to buy him at the end of the loan period after the 2011–12 season. Bulut also received interest from a number of German Bundesliga clubs. It was reported that Bulut had been frustrated that no one at Mladá Boleslav spoke fluent English and sources close to him reported that he felt his concerns were lost in translation with club officials. On 31 January 2012, it was announced that Bulut had officially transferred to Eskişehirspor. However, Bulut then returned to Mladá Boleslav during the 2011–12 season and was re-registered to the club with the number No. 16 shirt. He re-debuted in a 2–0 home victory against Sparta Praha on 22 April, where he was substituted onto the field in the 90th minute for Jan Chramosta.

2012 saw Bulut have stints with Mladá Boleslav's first-team and under-21 team. He was registered with number #33 for the 2012–13 Gambrinus liga season and made his first appearance in a 1–0 home victory against Hradec Králové on 23 September 2012. Bulut had been substituted onto the field for Martin Nespor in the 68th minute. Three days later, his first appearance in the 2012–13 Czech Cup came in a 1–1 away against Zenit Čáslav draw on 26 September 2012. Bulut played a full-90 minutes of the match as Mladá Boleslav eventually won 4–3 via a penalty shoot-out. Bulut ultimately went on to make three more league appearances. On 6 November 2012, Bulut scored in the 66th minute of Mladá Boleslva's second-leg Czech Cup 1–1 away draw against Třinec. Mladá Boleslav won the tie 4–1 on aggregate and advanced to the next round.

=== Akhisar Belediyespor ===
Having been on trial with Akhisar Belediyespor in Antalya, it was confirmed on in January 2013 that Bulut was officially transferred from Mladá Boleslav to Akhisar Belediyespor for the remainder of the 2012–13 Süper Lig season when he signed a three-and-a-half-year contract with the club. He was presented with the number No. 99 shirt. He debuted in a 1–1 home draw against Eskişehirspor on 21 January 2013, when he was substituted onto the field for Ahmet Cebe in the 77th minute.

=== Western Sydney Wanderers ===
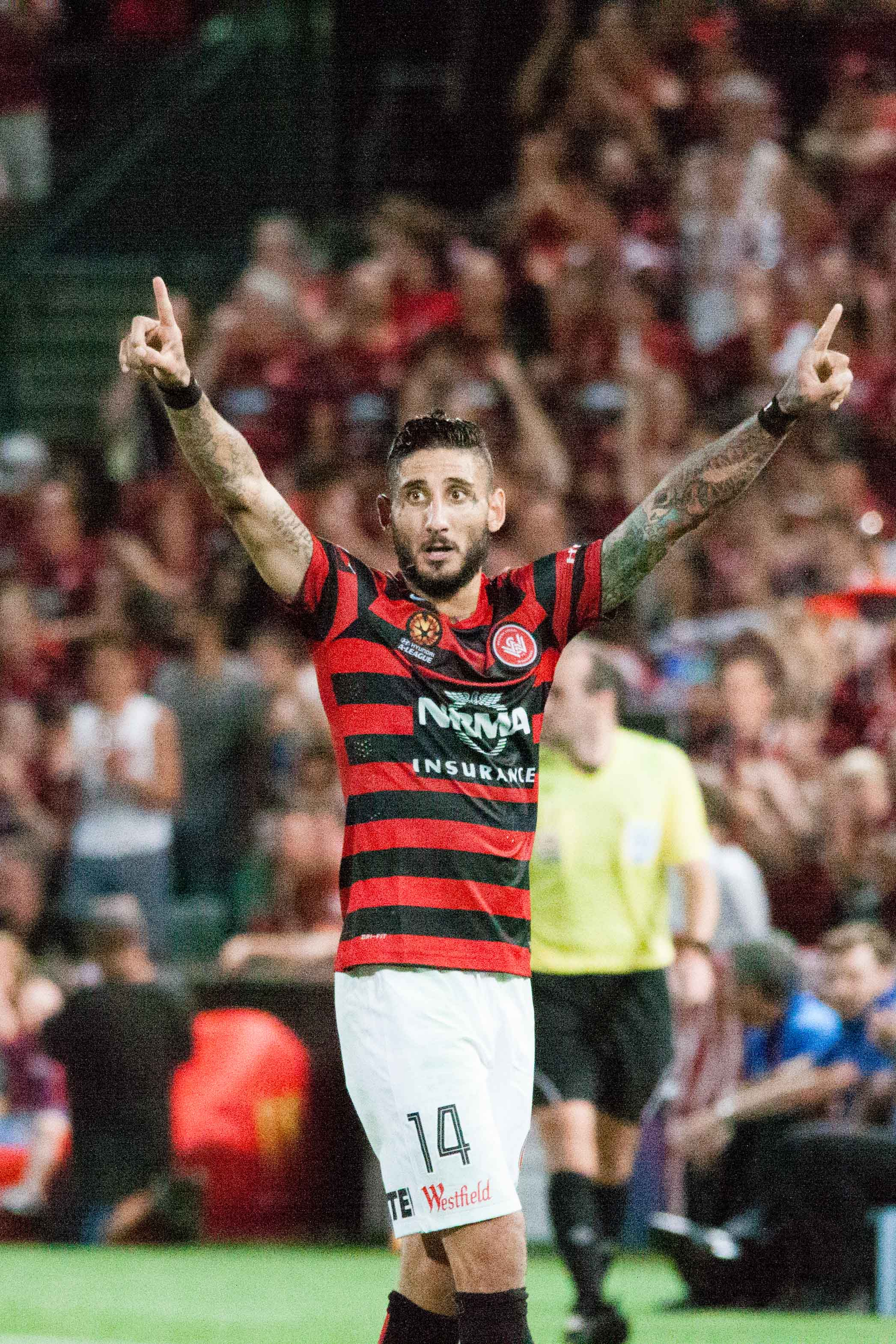
Bulut playing for the Western Sydney Wanderers in 2015

==== 2015: A-League breakthrough ====
Bulut signed for Western Sydney Wanderers on 13 January 2015. Initially registered for the AFC Champions League, Bulut’s registration for the A-League was accepted on 27 February 2015 as an injury replacement player. He made his debut for Wanderers on 28 February 2015, scoring two goals in a 4–3 Sydney Derby loss to Sydney FC at Parramatta Stadium. Despite being charged by police with intimidation, Bulut was cleared to play for Wanderers in their fixture against Melbourne Victory, who they would lose 1–0 to on 13 March 2015. Subsequently, Bulut scored two goals in the following fixture against Brisbane Roar on 25 March 2015 where they would win 4–1 at Suncorp Stadium.

Bulut scored his first goal in the AFC Champions League on 7 April 2015 in a 1–1 home draw to Seoul. After accumulating a tally of five league goals in seven appearances, Bulut was offered a contract by Western Sydney Wanderers but rejected the offer by the club for being below the average players' salary in the competition. He departed the club with six goals in 13 appearances, following the end of his contract on 30 May 2015 which upset fans who posted on social media and held banners, asking the Wanderers to re-sign the striker.

==== 2016: Spell at Iraklis and return to Wanderers ====
On 29 June 2015 Bulut signed a three-year contract with Super League Greece club Iraklis. Kerem Bulut made his Super League Greece debut for Iraklis on 30 August 2015 as a 65th-minute substitute for Lefteris Intzoglou in the 0–1 home loss to Panionios. On 14 September 2015, Kerem Bulut made his first starting appearance in the Super Leagu for Iraklis at home to Levadiakos. On 5 December 2015, he scored his first goal with the club, helping Iraklis to beat Asteras Tripolis 2–1, and retain its unbeaten record against Asteras. Bulut terminated his contract with Iraklis in July 2016, after not being paid for 5 months.

Bulut re-signed for Western Sydney Wanderers on 24 August 2016, following a successful trial and replaced Italian forward Federico Piovaccari, who was released at the end of the previous season. Bulut started in the first three league matches since his signing, remaining goalless in all three games. With Western Sydney Wanderers facing a goal-drought mid-season, Bulut was dropped from the squad by Tony Popovic despite the coach stating that he was “fit and not selected”. Popvic then openly criticised his poor performances at training as a reason for his absence. Bulut was released by Western Sydney Wanderers on 28 December 2016 with immediate effect.

=== SV Wehen Wiesbaden ===
On 28 January 2017, Bulut officially signed for 3rd Tier German side SV Wehen Wiesbaden. On 28 January 2017 had his debut against VfR Aalen after being subbed on in the second half.

=== Menemen Belediye ===
Bulut moved to third tier Turkish side Menemen Belediye where he had a successful season scoring 9 goals in 28 games. The club missed out on winning the premiership and the automatic promotion spot by 2 points. His team were eliminated in the first round of the promotion play-offs, under the away goals rule following an 2-2 aggregate draw against Keciörengücü. Bulut exited the club following the season.

=== Cocaine ban ===
On 17 October 2018, the Turkish Football Federation were revealed to have handed Bulut a 4 year ban after he tested positive to cocaine use following a drug test in the last week of the season. Bulut confessed to the substance usage and accepted the four year ban, which due to FIFA anti-doping regulations applies to all FIFA affiliated associations worldwide through to 2022. After his return to Australia in 2019, Bulut and the Professional Footballers Australia players union attempted to have his ban overturned by reclassifying the cocaine use as a minor infraction and subject to rehabilitation rather than the long punishment. This effort failed, and he was forcibly retired from professional football.

== Legal issues ==
On 17 November 2010, Bulut was arrested, and on 18 November faced Burwood Court charged with a range of alleged offences including malicious wounding with intent to cause grievous bodily harm; robbery in company; participate in criminal group; assist criminal activity, affray and intimidation. Bulut, along with Ahmed Nahle, Rashid Ramadan and Ismail Hadife plotted to intimidate two court witnesses. Ahmed Nahle, Rashid Ramadan, Ismail Hadife and a 16-year-old boy allegedly attacked the men with knives in a carpark in Auburn in September. The men suffered serious stab wounds. They were stabbed in the head, torso and leg. The victims were to give evidence against Nahle, Ramadan and Hadife in court.

Bulut allegedly again confronted the men outside a nightclub in George St in the inner city. Later Bulut threatened to smash the victim's head after a chance encounter while driving. The judge was told Bulut was part of a gang called Muslim Brotherhood Militants. The actions of Bulut are directly linked to previous crimes committed by members of MBM which involved the wounding of the same victims. They were robbed of their mobile phones and wallets at Bondi Beach on 12 November. He was granted conditional bail and was to face court again on 24 January 2011. On 7 April 2011 after a court hearing Bulut had his passport returned to him allowing him to return to his club Mladá Boleslav. It was hoped that playing as a professional footballer overseas will help him further distance himself from negative influences around him.

In September 2011 the police case against Bulut was withdrawn after the victims became unwilling to give evidence against them. Police said without the evidence of the victim there is little, if any, prospect of a successful prosecution.

After returning to Australia following his drugs ban, he was involved in several police incidents. Arrests for affray, assault and offensive language culminated in Bulut being held in remand at Silverwater Prison. In late March 2021 he was charged with multiple counts of assault against his cellmate with charges that carried a potential sentence of 25 years in prison.

== International career ==
=== Australia U-17 ===
In July 2008 Bulut was selected to represent the Australia U-17 team at the 2008 AFF U-16 Youth Championship in Indonesia. In Australia's second group stage match on 11 July Bulut scored in a 6–0 win against Indonesia. On 13 July he scored a brace in the second half of a 4–1 win against Malaysia. On 15 July in Australia's final group stage fixture Bulut scored on 42 minutes as Australia drew 1–1 against Singapore. Australia went on to win the tournament, beating Bahrain 5–4 on penalties after drawing 1–1 after extra time. Having scored four goals in the tournament, Bulut converted one of Australia's five penalties in the final's shoot-out. Bulut was then selected for Australia's U-17 squad for a tour in Turkey which saw him score for Australia in a 2–1 loss against the Turkey U-17 national team.

=== Australia U-20 ===
Bulut was selected to play in the 2010 AFC U-19 Championship held in China. He scored Australia's second goal in its first group stage 4–1 win over Yemen. Bulut would again deliver for the Young Socceroos after 60 minutes in their second group stage fixture as Australia would beat Iran at 3–0 and secured a spot in the knock-out stages. Australia were drawn with the UAE at the quarter-final stage when Bulut opened the scoring after just 6 minutes. The game was locked at 2–2 before Australia would eventually win after scoring 2 goals in extra-time. Bulut scored a brace in the semi-final against Saudi Arabia as Australia went on to win 2–0. Korea DPR would beat Australia 3–2 in the final, which saw Australia take the lead at 2–1 having been down 1–0, when Bulut scored both goals in the space of six minutes, as Australia went on to qualify for the 2011 FIFA U-20 World Cup. Bulut was awarded the Golden Boot of the tournament having scored 7 goals After his performance at the tournament, the media had publicised Bulut as a talent that Sydney had lost due to snubbing him during selection.

==== 2011 FIFA U-20 World Cup ====
On 13 July Bulut was selected in Australia's 21-man squad for the 2011 FIFA U-20 World Cup in Colombia. Drawn into Group C Bulut played in Australia's opening group stage fixture which resulted in a 1–1 draw against Ecuador on 31 July. Bulut then played another 90 minutes in a 3–2 loss to Costa Rica on 3 August, where his flick-on header was touched by Thomas Oar to score Australia's first goal. In Australia's last group stage match against Spain on 6 August, Bulut received the ball from a goal kick from Mark Birighitti before getting past a Spanish opponent and scoring past goal keeper Fernando Pacheco Flores to make the score line 4–1. The match finished 5–1 as Australia were eliminated from the tournament having finished in fourth position of their respective group with only one point.

=== Australia U23 ===
On 27 January 2012 he was selected to play for the Australia Olympic football team against Uzbekistan national under-23 football team and United Arab Emirates national under-23 football team. Kerem Bulut made his debut for the Australia Olympic football team in a friendly under 23's international against the Philippines at the Al Nasr Stadium in Dubai, UAE on 16 February 2012.

== Career statistics ==
=== Club in Europe ===
Statistics accurate as of 7 February 2016

Club	Season	League		Cup		Continental		Total	
Club	Season	Apps	Goals	Apps	Goals	Apps	Goals	Apps	Goals
Mladá Boleslav	2010–11	8	1	0	0	—		8	1
Mladá Boleslav	2011–12	11	1	0	0	—		11	1
Mladá Boleslav	2012–13	4	0	1	1	—		5	1
Mladá Boleslav	Total	23	2	1	1	—		24	3
Akhisar Belediyespor	2013–14	12	0	0	0	—		12	0
Akhisar Belediyespor	Total	12	0	0	0	—		12	0
Karşıyaka	2013–14	10	0	0	0	—		10	0
Karşıyaka	Total	10	0	0	0	—		10	0
Iraklis	2015–16	12	1	4	0	—		16	1
Iraklis	Total	12	1	4	0	—		16	1
Career total		57	3	5	1	—		62	4

== Honours ==
=== Player ===
FK Mladá Boleslav'

- Czech Cup: 2010–11

Australia U-20

- AFC U-20 Asian Cup: runner-up 2010

=== Individual ===
- 2010 AFC U-19 Championship Golden Boot
  - 7 Goals
