= Yemen national under-20 football team =

National association football team

- Nickname: Al-Yemen A'sa'eed
- Association: Yemen Football Association
- Confederation: AFC (Asia)
- Head coach: (Yemen) Mohammed Al-Nafie
- FIFA code: YEM
First colours	Second colours

First international
- Kuwait 2–0 North Yemen (Dhaka, Bangladesh; 6 October 1978)

Biggest win
- Yemen 10–1 Guam (Muang Xai, Laos; 16 September 2022)

Biggest defeat
- Iraq 6–0 North Yemen (Baghdad, Iraq; 7 October 1982)

The Yemen national under-20 football team represents Yemen in international under 20 football competitions. They qualified to 2014 AFC U-19 Championship in Myanmar.

== Tournament records ==
=== FIFA U-20 World Cup ===
Year	Result	Pld	W	D	L	GF	GA
(Tunisia) 1977– (Chile) 2025	Did not qualify						
(Azerbaijan) (Uzbekistan) 2027	To be determined						
Total		0	0	0	0	0	0

=== AFC U-20 Asian Cup ===
Year	Result	Pld	W	D	L	GF	GA
(Kuwait) 1975	Quarterfinal*	5	2	1	2	7	8
(Bangladesh) 1978	Group stage*	4	1	1	2	6	3
(Malaysia) 2004	Group stage*	3	0	0	3	1	8
(Saudi Arabia) 2008	Group stage*	3	0	0	3	1	11
(China) 2010	Group stage*	3	0	0	3	1	7
(Myanmar) 2014	Group stage*	3	1	1	1	3	3
(Bahrain) 2016	Group stage*	3	0	0	3	0	5
(China) 2025	Group stage*	2	0	0	2	0	7
Total	8	26	4	3	19	19	52

- 1975 as South Yemen and 1978 as North Yemen

== Results and fixtures ==
Win Draw Loss

Date	Location	Opponent	Score*	Competition

== Players ==
=== Current squad ===
The squad which played 2014 AFC U-19 Championship qualification

No.	Pos.	Player	Date of birth (age)	Caps	Club
1	GK	Yaser Manaji Ebrahim Yahya Thawab	1 January 1994 (age 32)	0	(Yemen)
25	GK	Abdulwahab Mohammed Ebrahim Mohammed	1 January 1994 (age 32)	0	(Yemen)
22	GK	Mohammed Abdulaziz Mahmood Abdulrab	1 January 1994 (age 32)	0	(Yemen)
28	DF	Ahmed Adam Saif Al-Ozaibi	1 January 1994 (age 32)	0	(Yemen)
16	DF	Rami Ali Yahya Al-Wasmani	1 January 1994 (age 32)	0	(Yemen)
15	DF	Abdulhakim Abdullah Saif Ahmed	1 January 1994 (age 32)	0	(Yemen)
6	DF	Alawi Zain Saleh Fadaaq	1 January 1994 (age 32)	0	(Yemen)
5	DF	Ala Addin Noman Abdullah Mahdi (c)	1 January 1994 (age 32)	0	(Yemen)
4	DF	Mugahed Abdo Mohammed Farea	1 January 1994 (age 32)	0	(Yemen)
3	DF	Esam Ali Qaid Mohammed Al-Baadani	1 January 1994 (age 32)	0	(Yemen)
7	MF	Hatem Ali Yahya Al-Haidari	1 January 1994 (age 32)	0	(Yemen)
9	MF	Hamzah Ahmed Abdullah Al Shahamy	1 January 1994 (age 32)	0	(Yemen)
8	MF	Al-AghwaniI Husam Abdullah Mohammed	1 January 1994 (age 32)	0	(Yemen)
11	MF	Al-Shaibani Khairi Yousef Alwan	1 January 1994 (age 32)	0	(Yemen)
13	MF	Aiman Abdulkafi Hamed Ahmed	1 January 1994 (age 32)	0	(Yemen)
21	MF	Sulaiman Abdo Mohammed Hezam	1 January 1994 (age 32)	0	(Yemen)
10	FW	Aref Abdullah Mohammed Ali Al-Merghmi	1 January 1994 (age 32)	0	(Yemen)
12	FW	Khaled Hussein Ahmed Saleh Mahdi	1 January 1994 (age 32)	0	(Yemen)
20	FW	Abdlrhman Abdullah Saeed Ahmed Al-Shehri	1 January 1994 (age 32)	0	(Yemen)
14	FW	Ahmed Ghanem Ali Al-Rawhani	1 January 1994 (age 32)	0	(Yemen)
17	FW	Wahib Yahya Abdullah Al-Mufti	1 January 1994 (age 32)	0	(Yemen)
18	FW	Ali Abdullah Ali Mohammed Hafeedh	1 January 1994 (age 32)	0	(Yemen)
27	FW	Ali Mohammed Ali Al-Qadasi	1 January 1994 (age 32)	0	(Yemen)

== Coaching staff ==
Position	Name	Notes
Head coach	(Yemen) Mohammed Al-Nafie	
Team manager	(Yemen) Mokhtar Ali Al-Yarm	

== Former squads ==
- 2008 AFC U-19 Championship squads
- 2010 AFC U-19 Championship squads
