= Tan Hai (referee) =

Chinese football referee

- Simplified Chinese: 谭海
- Traditional Chinese: 譚海
Transcriptions
Standard Mandarin
- Hanyu Pinyin: Tán Hǎi
- IPA: [tʰǎn xàɪ]

Tan Hai (Chinese: 谭海; pinyin: Tán Hǎi; Mandarin pronunciation: [tʰǎn xàɪ]; born 27 November 1970 in Jinan, Shandong, China) is a professional Chinese association football referee and the associate professor of football department of Beijing Sport University. He has been refereeing in the Chinese Super League since 2005.

Tan became a FIFA referee in 2004. He has served as a referee in competitions including the 2005 and 2008 East Asian Football Championships, AFC Champions League, and 2014 FIFA World Cup qualifiers.
