= Linzi Stadium =

Sports venue in Zibo, China

- Interactive map of Linzi Stadium
- Location: Linzi, China
- Coordinates: 36°49′38.40″N 118°17′40.47″E
- Capacity: 14,000

Tenant
- 2010 AFC U-19 Championship

Linzi Stadium is a football stadium in Linzi, China. It hosts football matches and hosted the 2010 AFC U-19 Championship. The stadium holds 14,000 spectators.
