= Zibo Sports Center Stadium =

Football stadium in Zibo, China

Zibo City Sports Centre Stadium
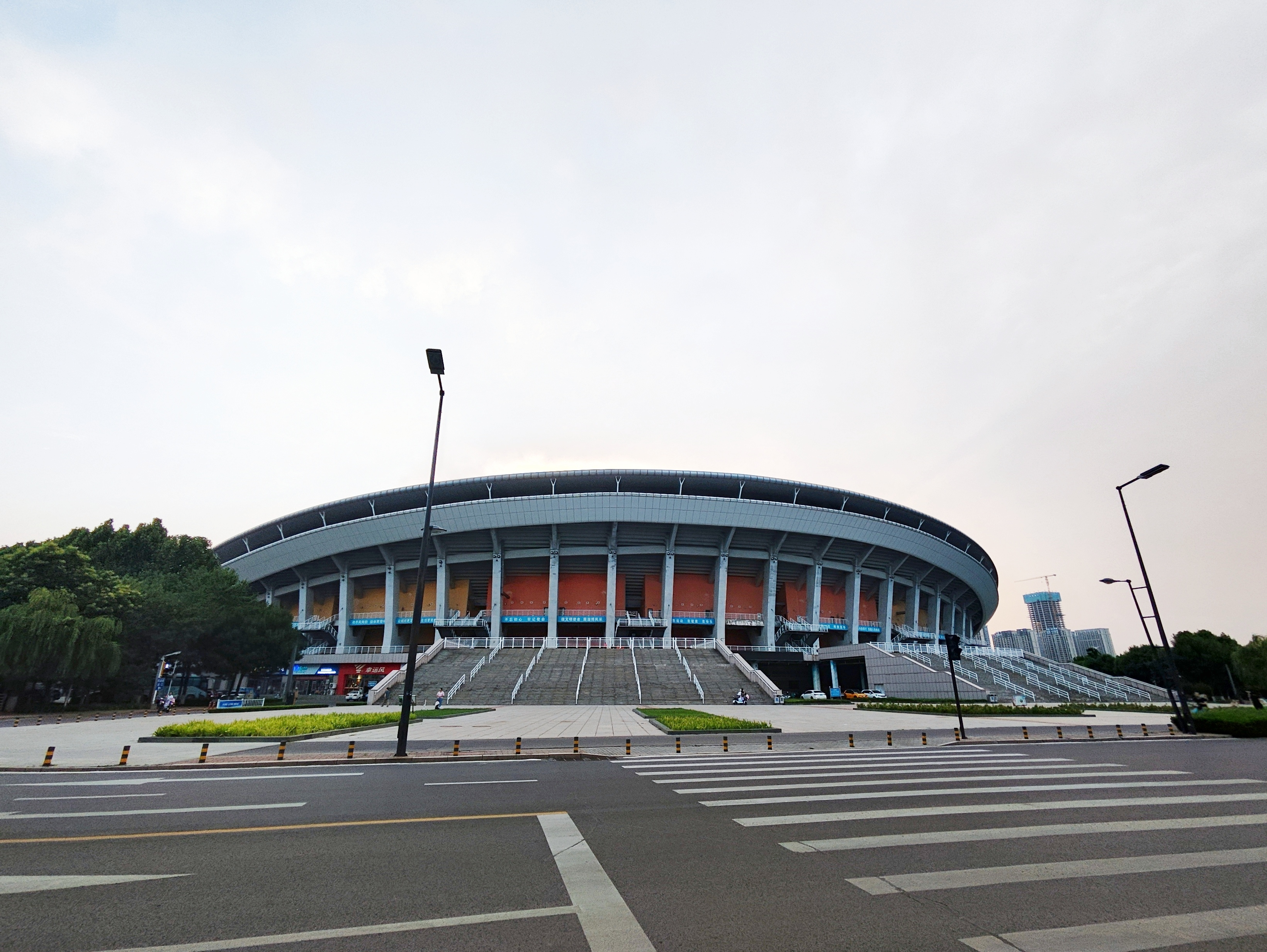
- Interactive map of Zibo City Sports Centre Stadium
- Location: Zibo, China
- Coordinates: 36°48′47.90″N 117°58′58.28″E
- Capacity: 45,000

Tenants
- 2010 AFC U-19 Championship; Zibo Qisheng F.C.

The Zibo City Sports Centre Stadium (Chinese: 淄博市体育中心体育场; pinyin: Zibo Shi Tiyuzhongxin Tiyuchang) is a football stadium in Zibo, Shandong, China. It hosts football matches, and hosted the 2010 AFC U-19 Championship. The stadium holds 45,000 spectators.
