= Linzi, Zibo =

Linzi District 临淄区 Lin-tzu, Lintze
- District
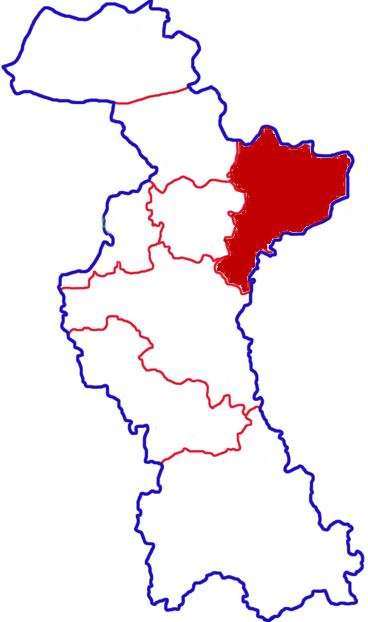
- Location in Zibo

- Location in Shandong
- Coordinates: 36°49′N 118°18′E
- Country: People's Republic of China
- Province: Shandong
- Prefecture-level city: Zibo

Area
  - Total: 663.7 km^{2} (256.3 sq mi)

Population (2014)
  - Total: 614,976
  - Density: 926.6/km^{2} (2,400/sq mi)
- Time zone: UTC+8 (China Standard)
- Postal code: 255400
- Area code: +86 0533
- Website: www.linzi.gov.cn

Linzi District (simplified Chinese: 临淄区; traditional Chinese: 臨淄區; pinyin: Línzī Qū) is a district of the prefecture-level city of Zibo, in central Shandong province, China. Located near the Shengli Oil Field, Linzi's economy is driven by petro-chemical refinery. Wheat, corn and cotton are cultivated in the rural areas surrounding the urban center.

The ruins of Ancient Linzi located in the northwest of the district, was the site of the ancient State of Qi's capital.

Linzi is one of the most highly developed industrial districts in north China with relatively high GDP in Shandong Province.

== Administrative divisions ==
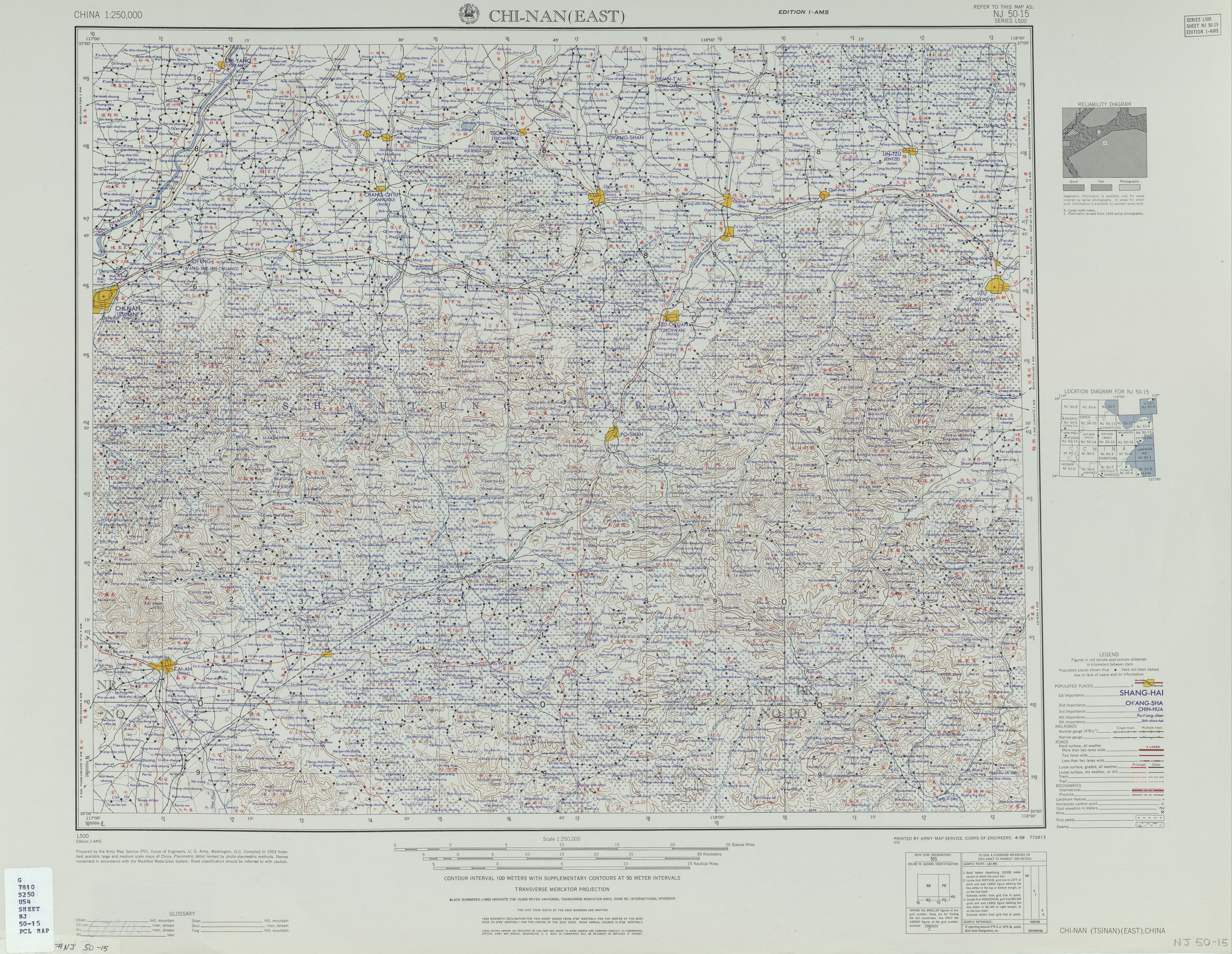
Map including Linzi (labeled as LIN-TZU (LINTZE) (Walled) 臨淄) (AMS, 1953)

As of 2012, this District is divided to 5 subdistricts, 7 towns and 1 township.

Subdistricts

- Wenshao Subdistrict (闻韶街道)
- Xuegong Subdistrict (雪宫街道)
- Xindian Subdistrict (辛店街道)
- Jixia Subdistrict (稷下街道)
- Qiling Subdistrict (齐陵街道)

Towns

- Qidu (齐都镇)
- Huangcheng (皇城镇)
- Jingzhong (敬仲镇)
- Zhutai (朱台镇)
- Wutai (梧台镇)
- Jinling (金岭镇)
- Nanwang (南王镇)
- Fenghuang (凤凰镇)

Townships

- Bianhe Township (边河乡)

== Climate ==
Climate data for Linzi, elevation 55 m (180 ft), (1991–2020 normals, extremes 1981–present)
Month	Jan	Feb	Mar	Apr	May	Jun	Jul	Aug	Sep	Oct	Nov	Dec	Year
Record high °C (°F)	20.4 (68.7)	23.7 (74.7)	32.0 (89.6)	35.0 (95.0)	38.5 (101.3)	41.7 (107.1)	39.8 (103.6)	39.5 (103.1)	39.7 (103.5)	32.4 (90.3)	27.3 (81.1)	20.5 (68.9)	41.7 (107.1)
Mean daily maximum °C (°F)	3.9 (39.0)	7.9 (46.2)	15.1 (59.2)	21.8 (71.2)	27.6 (81.7)	31.8 (89.2)	32.5 (90.5)	31.0 (87.8)	27.6 (81.7)	21.5 (70.7)	13.2 (55.8)	5.7 (42.3)	20.0 (67.9)
Daily mean °C (°F)	−1.5 (29.3)	1.9 (35.4)	8.6 (47.5)	15.2 (59.4)	21.3 (70.3)	25.6 (78.1)	27.2 (81.0)	25.8 (78.4)	21.4 (70.5)	15.0 (59.0)	7.2 (45.0)	0.4 (32.7)	14.0 (57.2)
Mean daily minimum °C (°F)	−6.0 (21.2)	−3.2 (26.2)	2.5 (36.5)	8.7 (47.7)	14.6 (58.3)	19.4 (66.9)	22.5 (72.5)	21.7 (71.1)	16.4 (61.5)	9.4 (48.9)	2.0 (35.6)	−4.1 (24.6)	8.7 (47.6)
Record low °C (°F)	−20.0 (−4.0)	−15.8 (3.6)	−9.6 (14.7)	−3.1 (26.4)	1.0 (33.8)	10.2 (50.4)	14.2 (57.6)	12.1 (53.8)	6.3 (43.3)	−3.3 (26.1)	−12.1 (10.2)	−21.6 (−6.9)	−21.6 (−6.9)
Average precipitation mm (inches)	8.1 (0.32)	13.9 (0.55)	10.7 (0.42)	29.5 (1.16)	59.9 (2.36)	75.4 (2.97)	148.7 (5.85)	169.3 (6.67)	48.5 (1.91)	23.7 (0.93)	26.7 (1.05)	9.2 (0.36)	623.6 (24.55)
Average precipitation days (≥ 0.1 mm)	2.8	3.6	3.3	5.5	7.0	8.3	12.2	11.9	7.2	5.5	4.9	3.7	75.9
Average snowy days	4.0	3.4	1.5	0.2	0	0	0	0	0	0	0.9	2.1	12.1
Average relative humidity (%)	59	56	48	52	57	61	75	79	73	67	65	61	63
Mean monthly sunshine hours	159.9	166.8	223.3	237.8	261.7	227.6	191.9	187.1	185.9	184.6	163.3	162.3	2,352.2
Percentage possible sunshine	52	54	60	60	60	52	43	45	51	54	54	55	53
Source: China Meteorological Administrationall-time August record

== People from Linzi ==
1. Zuo Si, poet of the Western Jin
2. Zuo Fen, poet of the Western Jin
