= List of people from Irbid =

Irbid (Arabic: إربد), known in ancient times as Arabella or Arbela, has the second largest metropolitan population in Jordan after Amman, with a population of around 1,088,100, and is located about 70 km north of Amman on the northern ridge of the Gilead

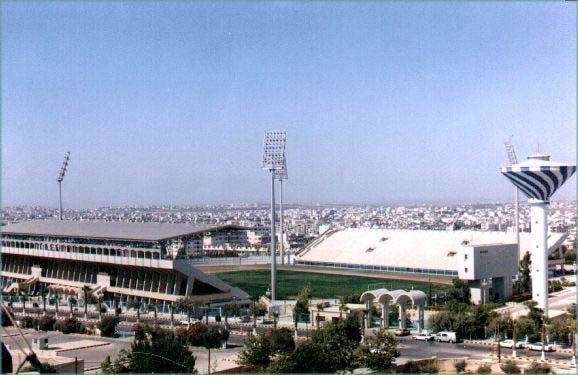
Prince Hassan Youth City in Irbid.

The city of Irbid has many men who built Irbid and Jordan, and they had a strong influence in the country

The following is a list of notable people from Irbid:

== Previous Mayors (1800s) ==
1. Mahmoud Al Hamoud (1881 - 1890)
2. Saeed Sharari (1891 - 1897)
3. Sheikh Ahmad Ismail Al Sebarani Al Sabbagh (1898 - 1899)

== Military ==
- Abdullah el-Tell
- Mohammad Al-Malkawi
- Ali Khulqi Alsharairi
- Qassem Al-Nasser

== Politicians ==
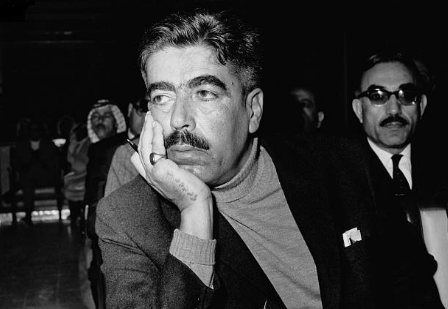
Wasfi al-Tal in 1962 after his government gained confidence of Parliament.

- Wasfi al-Tal
- Awn Al-Khasawneh
- Fahd Jaradat
- Abdul-Karim Gharaybeh
- Fawzi Al-Mulki
- Hani Al-Mulki
- Ahmad Obeidat
- Abdelraouf Al-Rawabdeh
- Saleh Rusheidat
- Abdul Nasser Bani Hani

== Poets ==
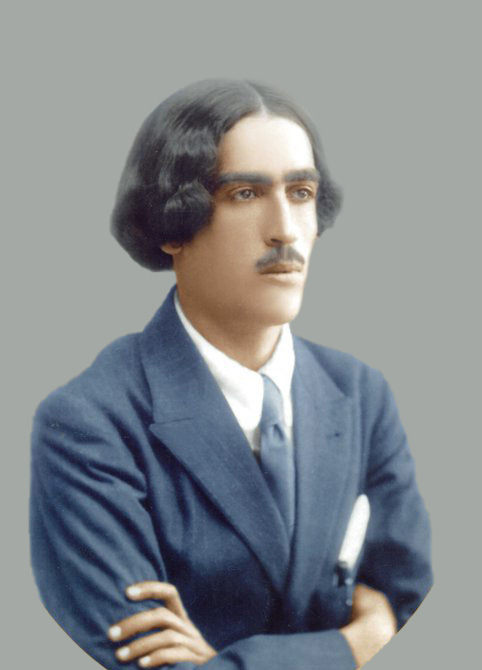
Mustafa Wahbi Al-Tal in 1922

- Mustafa Wahbi al-Tal
- George Haddad

== Writers ==
- Suleiman Mousa

== Researchers ==
- Maroun Elias Nimeh Lahham
- Mohammad S. Obaidat
- Kamal Bani Hani
- Nizar Haddad

== Musicians ==
- Mondher Rayahneh
- Tawfiq Al-Nimri
- Mahmoud Radaideh

== Athletes ==
- Ahmad Hayel
- Laith Al-Bashtawi
- Mohammad Shatnawi
- Anas Al-Zboun
- Mohammad Balas
- Hamza Al-Dardour
- Bashar Bani Yaseen
- Anas Bani Yaseen
- Mussab Al-Laham
- Mohammad Al-Alawneh
- Yasser Al-Rawashdeh
- Ahmad Al-Sagheer
