= 2006–07 Jordan FA Cup =

Tournament details
- Country: Jordan
- Dates: 5 September 2006 – 14 June 2007
- Teams: 22

Final positions
- Champions: Shabab Al-Ordon (2nd title)
- Runners-up: Al-Faisaly
- 2008 AFC Cup: Shabab Al-Ordon

Tournament statistics
- Matches played: 21
- Goals scored: 62 (2.95 per match)
- Top goal scorer(s): Khaled Shatnawi (5 goals)
- All statistics correct as of July 2017.

The 2006–07 Jordan FA Cup is the 27th edition of the Jordan FA Cup since its establishment in 1980. It started on 5 September 2006 and ended on 14 June 2007. Shabab Al-Ordon. The winner of the competition will earn a spot in the 2008 AFC Cup.

Shabab Al-Ordon won their second title after a 2–0 win over Al-Faisaly in the final on 14 June 2007.

== Participating teams ==
A total of 22 teams participated in this season. 10 teams from the 2006–07 Jordan League, 12 teams from the First Division.

League	Teams
Jordan Premier League	Al-Arabi; Al-Baqa'a; Al-Faisaly; Al-Hussein; Al-Jazeera; Al-Ramtha; Al-Wehdat; Al-Yarmouk; Ittihad Al-Ramtha; Shabab Al-Ordon
1st Division	Al-Ahli; Al-Badiah Al-Wosta; Al-Karmel; Al-Qouqazi; Al-Rusaifa; Al-Sareeh; Al-Turra; Kufrsoum; Mansheyat Bani Hasan; Sahab; Shabab Al-Hussein; That Ras

== First round ==
In this round, each tie was played as a single match. Extra time and penalty shoot-out were used to decide the winner if necessary . The six winners of this round advanced to the round of 16 to join the 10 direct entrants.

5 September 2006	Shabab Al-Hussein	5–2	That Ras	Amman
18:00	Hamarsheh 12', 18', 90'; Kutkut 14'; Sarsour 54'		Al-Btoush 41', 87'	Stadium: King Abdullah II Stadium

5 September 2006	Al-Ahli	3–1	Mansheyat Bani Hasan	Al-Salt
18:00	Fashho 12', 19'; Reziq 70'		Al-Jbour 18'	Stadium: Al-Salt Stadium

5 September 2006	Al-Badiah Al-Wosta	2–0	Al-Qouqazi	Amman
18:00	Al-Okail 27'; Hawa 90'			Stadium: Petra Stadium

5 September 2006	Al-Turra	1–1 (2–3 p)	Al-Rusaifa	Al-Mafraq
18:00	Qadoura 86'		Fares 60'	Stadium: Al-Mafraq Stadium

5 September 2006	Al-Karmel	1–1 (6–5 p)	Sahab	Irbid
18:00	Al-Zubaidi 50'		Jameel 12'	Stadium: Prince Hashim Stadium

26 September 2006	Al-Sareeh	3–0	Kufrsoum
18:00	Shatnawi 15', 38', 79'

== Bracket ==
Round of 16
A	Al-Sareeh	3
H	Ittihad Al-Ramtha	1
A	Al-Badiah Al-Wosta	0
H	Shabab Al-Ordon	7
A	Al-Wehdat	2
H	Al-Karmel	0
H	Al-Baqa'a	1
A	Al-Jazeera	0
A	Al-Arabi	2
H	Al-Ramtha	1
A	Al-Hussein	2
H	Shabab Al-Hussein	0
A	Al-Ahli	0
H	Al-Yarmouk	3
A	Al-Rusaifa	0
H	Al-Faisaly	3

Quarter-finals
H	Al-Sareeh	0
A	Shabab Al-Ordon	3
H	Al-Wehdat	0(2)
A	Al-Baqa'a	1(4)
H	Al-Arabi	2
A	Al-Hussein	3
H	Al-Yarmouk	0
A	Al-Faisaly	1

Semi-finals
H	Shabab Al-Ordon	2
A	Al-Baqa'a	0
H	Al-Hussein	0
A	Al-Faisaly	2

Final
H	Shabab Al-Ordon	2
A	Al-Faisaly	0

Note: H: Home team, A: Away team

== Round of 16 ==
The Round of 16 matches were played between 29 September and 1 October 2006.

29 September 2006	Al-Karmel	0–2	Al-Wehdat	Irbid
20:30			Abdel-Fattah; Deeb	Stadium: Al-Hassan Stadium

29 September 2006	Shabab Al-Ordon	7–0	Al-Badiah Al-Wosta	Amman
20:30	Jamal; Al-Saify; Abu Touk; Lafi; Al-Dawud			Stadium: King Abdullah II Stadium

29 September 2006	Al-Faisaly	3–0	Al-Rusaifa	Amman
20:30	Al-Otaiby; Al-Tall; Al-Shboul			Stadium: Amman International Stadium

30 September 2006	Al-Baqa'a	1–0	Al-Jazeera	Amman
20:30	Al-Ryahneh			Stadium: Amman International Stadium

30 September 2006	Shabab Al-Hussein	0–2	Al-Hussein	Amman
20:30			Bani Yaseen; Hatamleh	Stadium: King Abdullah II Stadium

30 September 2006	Ittihad Al-Ramtha	1–3	Al-Sareeh	Irbid
20:30	Hefnawi		Shatnawi, Shhabat	Stadium: Al-Hassan Stadium

1 October 2006	Al-Yarmouk	3–0	Al-Ahli	Amman
20:30	Al-Barghouthi; Helmi; Abu Awad			Stadium: Amman International Stadium

1 October 2006	Al-Ramtha	1–2	Al-Arabi	Irbid
20:30	Awagleh		Abu-Aleeqa; Bani Hani	Stadium: Al-Hassan Stadium

== Quarter-finals ==
The Quarter-finals matches were played between 10 November and 25 November 2006.

10 November 2006	Al-Sareeh	0–3	Shabab Al-Ordon	Amman
16:00			Hijawi; Lafi; Abu Touk	Stadium: King Abdullah II Stadium

23 November 2006	Al-Yarmouk	0–1	Al-Faisaly	Amman
16:00			Al-Maharmeh	Stadium: Amman International Stadium

24 November 2006	Al-Wehdat	1–1 (2–4 p)	Al-Baqa'a	Amman
16:00	Deeb		Abdel-Haleem	Stadium: King Abdullah II Stadium

25 November 2006	Al-Arabi	2–3	Al-Hussein	Irbid
14:00	Bsoul; Salah o.g.'		Hatamleh; Al-Sheyab	Stadium: Al-Hassan Stadium

== Semi-finals ==
The four winners of the quarter-finals progressed to the semi-finals. The semi-finals were played on 26 January 2007.

26 January 2007	Al-Hussein	0–2	Al-Faisaly	Zarqa
16:00			Abu Alieh; Al-Maharmeh	Stadium: Prince Mohammed Stadium

26 January 2007	Shabab Al-Ordon	2–0	Al-Baqa'a	Amman
16:00			Jawdat 81'; Omaier 91'	Stadium: King Abdullah II Stadium

== Final ==
The final was played on 14 June 2007 at Amman International Stadium.

14 June 2007
18:00 AST

Shabab Al-Ordon	2–0	Al-Faisaly
Abu Touk 6' (pen.); Omaier 43'	Report

Amman International Stadium, Amman

== Top goalscorers ==
Rank	Player	Club	Goals
1	(Jordan) Khaled Shatnawi	Al-Sareeh	5
2	(Jordan) Ahmed Hatamleh	Al-Hussein	3
2	(Jordan) Essam Abu Touk	Shabab Al-Ordon	3
2	(Jordan) Mohammad Jamal	Shabab Al-Ordon	3
2	(Jordan) Ghanem Hamarsheh	Shabab Al-Hussein	3
