= Mohammad Jamal =

Mohammad Jamal may refer to:

- Mohammad Jamal (footballer)
- Mohammad Jamal (singer)

== See also ==
- Mohammed Jamal (disambiguation)
