= Mohammad Zureiqat =

Jordanian footballer (born 1991)

Personal information
- Full name: Mohammad Hussein Musa Zureiqat
- Date of birth: 8 September 1991 (age 35)
- Place of birth: Ramtha, Jordan
- Height: 1.83 m (6 ft 0 in)
- Position: Defender

Team information
- Current team: Newroz

Youth career
- 2006–2010: Al-Ramtha

Senior career*
Years	Team	Apps	(Gls)
2010–2013	Al-Ramtha		(1)
2012–2013	→ Al-Arabi (loan)		(1)
2014–2015	Mansheyat Bani Hasan		(2)
2015–2016	Al-Hussein		
2016–2017	Al-Faisaly		
2017–2018	Hidd		
2018	Al-Ramtha		(1)
2018–2019	Najran		(3)
2019–2020	Muaither		
2020–2021	Al-Thoqbah		
2021–2022	Al-Faisaly		
2022	Al-Nahda	13	(3)
2022–2023	Al-Faisaly		
2023–2025	Al-Salt		
2025–	Newroz		

International career
2009–2010	Jordan U19		(0)
2012–2014	Jordan U22		(0)
- * Club domestic league appearances and goals

Mohammad Hussein Musa Zureiqat (Arabic: مُحَمَّد حُسَيْن مُوسَى زُرَيْقَات; born 8 September 1991), commonly known as Mohammad Abu Zureiq, is a Jordanian footballer who plays as a defender for Iraq Stars League club Newroz.
