= Mohammed Jamal =

Mohammed Jamal may refer to:

- Jamal Mohamed (born 1988), Kenyan footballer for Al-Nasr S.C.S.C.
- Mohammed Jamal (footballer, born 1994), Emirati footballer for Al Jazira
- Mohammed Jamal (footballer, born 1989), Emirati footballer for Hatta
- Mohammed Jamal Jebreen (born 1982), Palestinian footballer

== See also ==
- Mohammad Jamal (disambiguation)
