= Hashemite University =

University in Jordan

Coordinates: 32.1032°N 36.1840°E

The Hashemite University
- الجامعة الهاشمية
- Type: Public
- Established: 1995
- Affiliations: IAU, FUIW, AArU
- Chairman: Yasen Al Husban.
- President: khaled al hiyari
- Academic staff: 837 (2021)
- Students: 30,253 (2021)
- Location: Zarqa, Jordan
- Campus: Urban 8519 Dunam
- Colors: Orange and Red
- Nickname: Hashmieh
- Website: www.hu.edu.jo

The Hashemite University (الجامعة الهاشمية), often abbreviated HU, is a public university in Jordan. It was established in 1995. The university is located in the vicinity of the city of Zarqa. As regards the study systems, it applies the credit hour system. Each college has its own number of credit hours. It is the first university in Jordan to apply the Two-Summer-Semester system. The Hashemite University offers a variety of different master programs. It also offers an international admission program which allows non-Jordanian students to enroll at the university.

== Geographical location ==
The Hashemite University is located in the city of Zarqa on a site parallel to two international highways. The west gate of the university, which is the main gate, opens to the international highway that links Amman with Mafraq and Irbid and from there to Syria. The south gate opens to the highway that leads to AzZarqa and from there to Iraq And Saudi Arabia.

== History ==
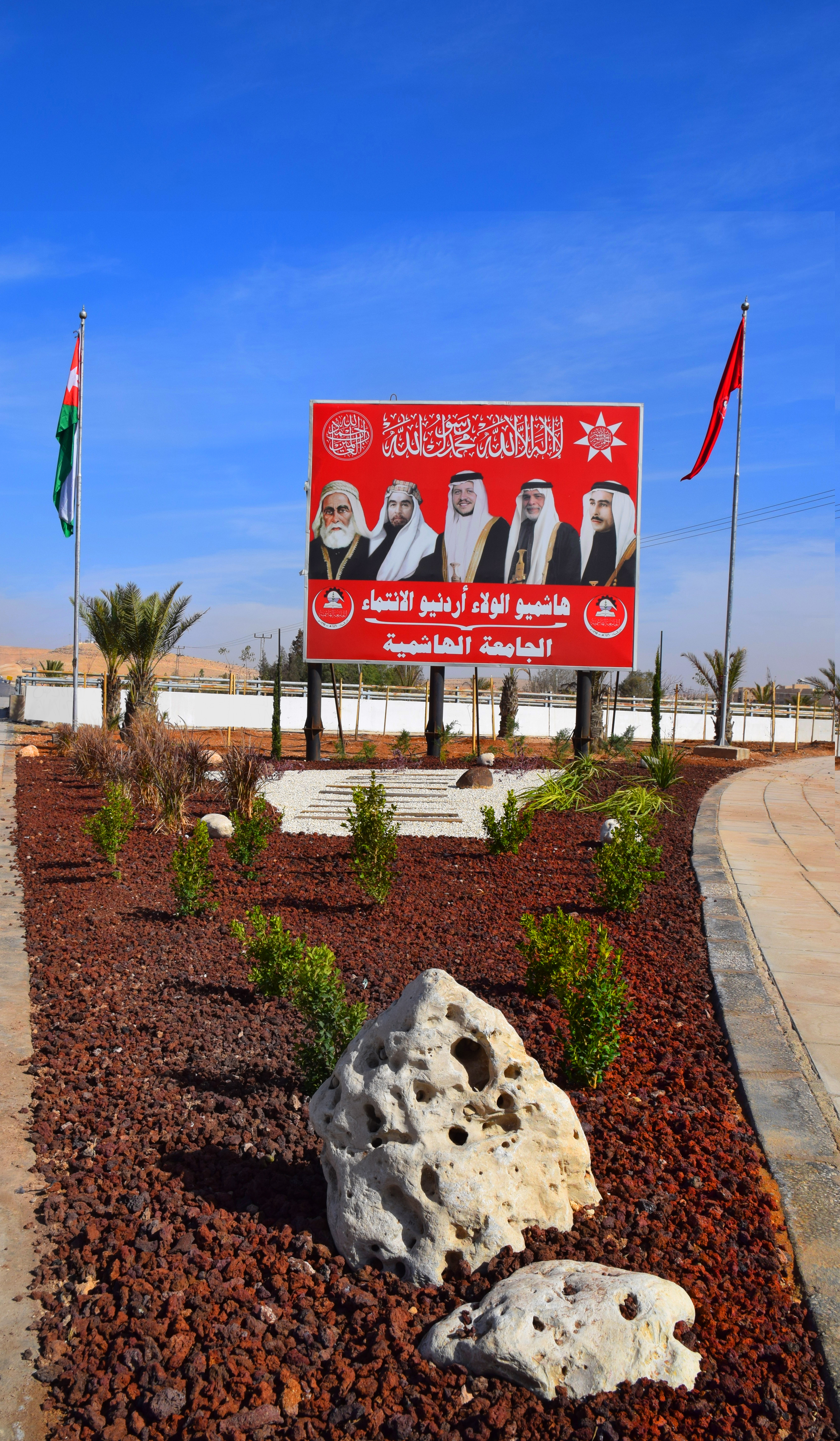
hashemite university entrance

The Royal Decree to establish the Hashemite University was issued on 19 June 1991. Teaching at the university started on 16 September 1995. The total area of the university's campus is 8519 acres. The university received the order of Independence of first class for its achievements in renewable energy and higher education.

== Academics ==
The university comprises 19 colleges (faculties) and institutes. It offers 52 specialties at undergraduate level and 35 specialties at postgraduate level (doctorate, master, higher diploma, in addition to a number of professional diploma programs).

=== Faculty of Medicine ===
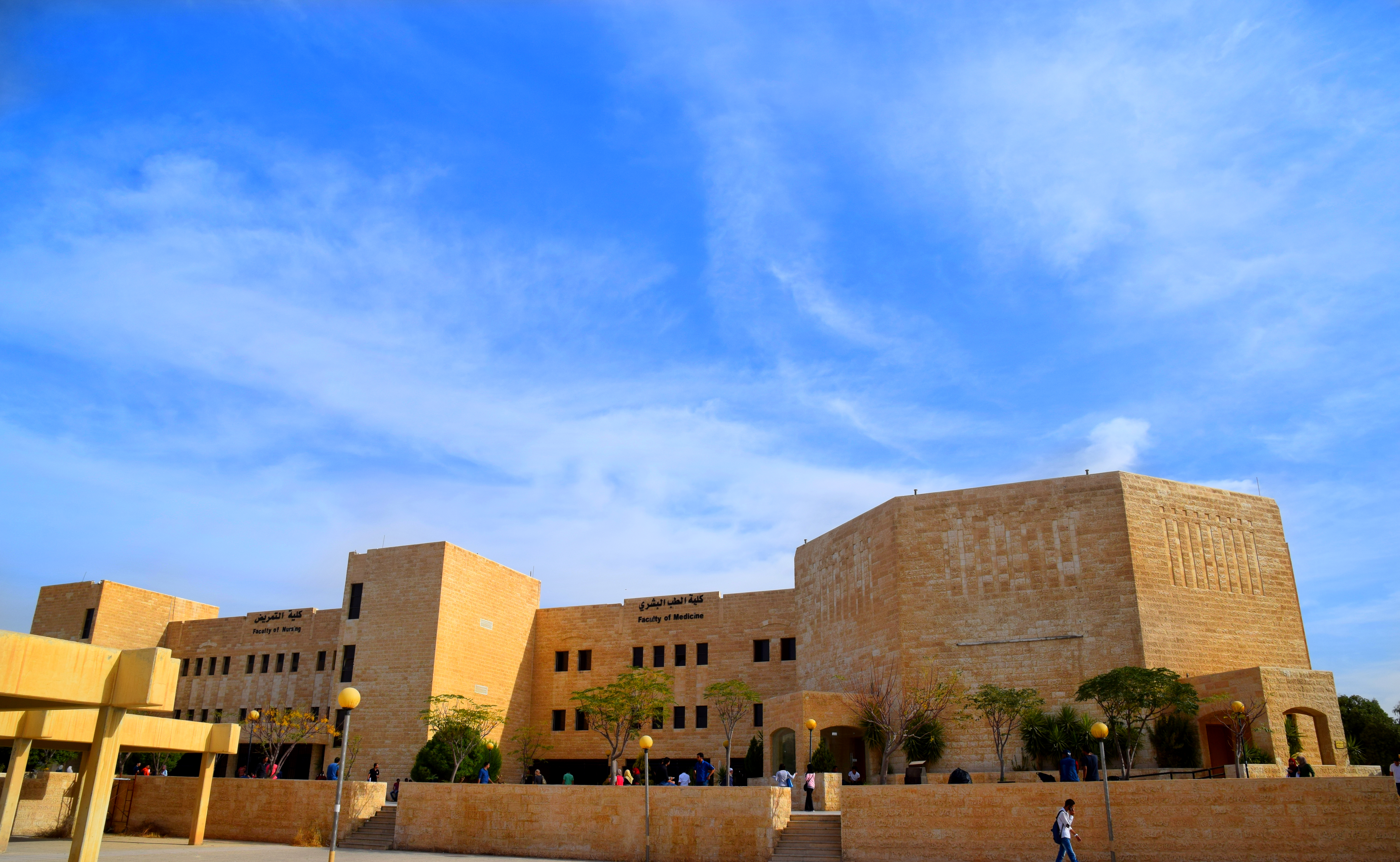
Faculty of Medicine

The decree of establishing the Faculty of Medicine at the Hashemite University was issued in the academic year 2005/2006. The faculty admitted the first intake of students in the academic year 2006/2007. It signed a collaboration protocol with the Ministry of Health and the Royal Medical Services. The agreement includes a number of terms that contribute to aiding and supporting the knowledge in the field of medicine, and to enhancing the exchange of scientific and practical experience. The Permanent Council of the faculty was established to implement the Standards and the guidelines of granting the bachelor's degree of Medicine. The council accomplished the study plan and course descriptions for the award of this degree. The college grants the BA Degree of "Doctor of Medicine" after the completion of 257 credit hours. The plan was modified in the beginning of 2011 to bring about more focus on the practical elements. The faculty was officially opened in an opening ceremony attended by his majesty king Abdullah II in 2010. The faculty is assigned on to World Directory of Medical Schools.

=== Faculty of Engineering ===
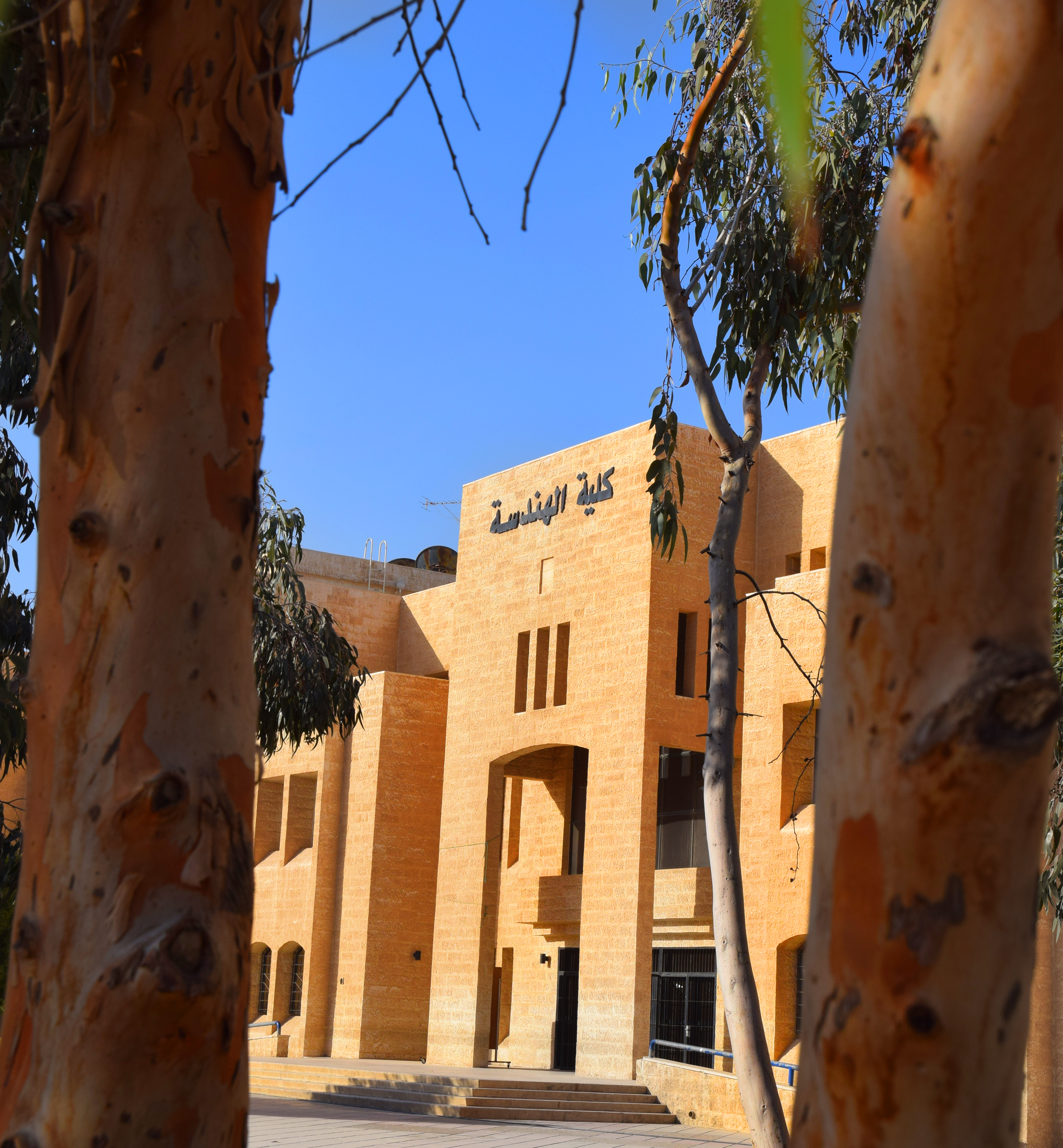
Faculty of Engineering

The Faculty of Engineering was established in August 1998. The faculty offers undergraduate and graduate degrees in eight programs. The bachelor's degrees are in Architecture, Civil, Electrical, Industrial, Biomedical, Mechanical, Computer, and Mechatronics Engineering. The Master programs offered by the faculty are Mechanical and Civil Engineering, Energy Systems, Maintenance Management, and Testing Technology. On 28 August 2018, the faculty fulfilled the criteria of Accreditation Board for Engineering and Technology (ABET).

=== Faculty of Sciences ===
The Faculty of Science was initially established as part of a combined Science and Arts Faculty in 1995/1996. In 1998/1999, the Department of Geology was separated from the Faculty, and become a part of the Faculty of Natural Resources and Environment and in 2001/2002. It holds four departments, which are Physics, Mathematics, Chemistry, and Biotechnology.

=== Faculty of Arts ===
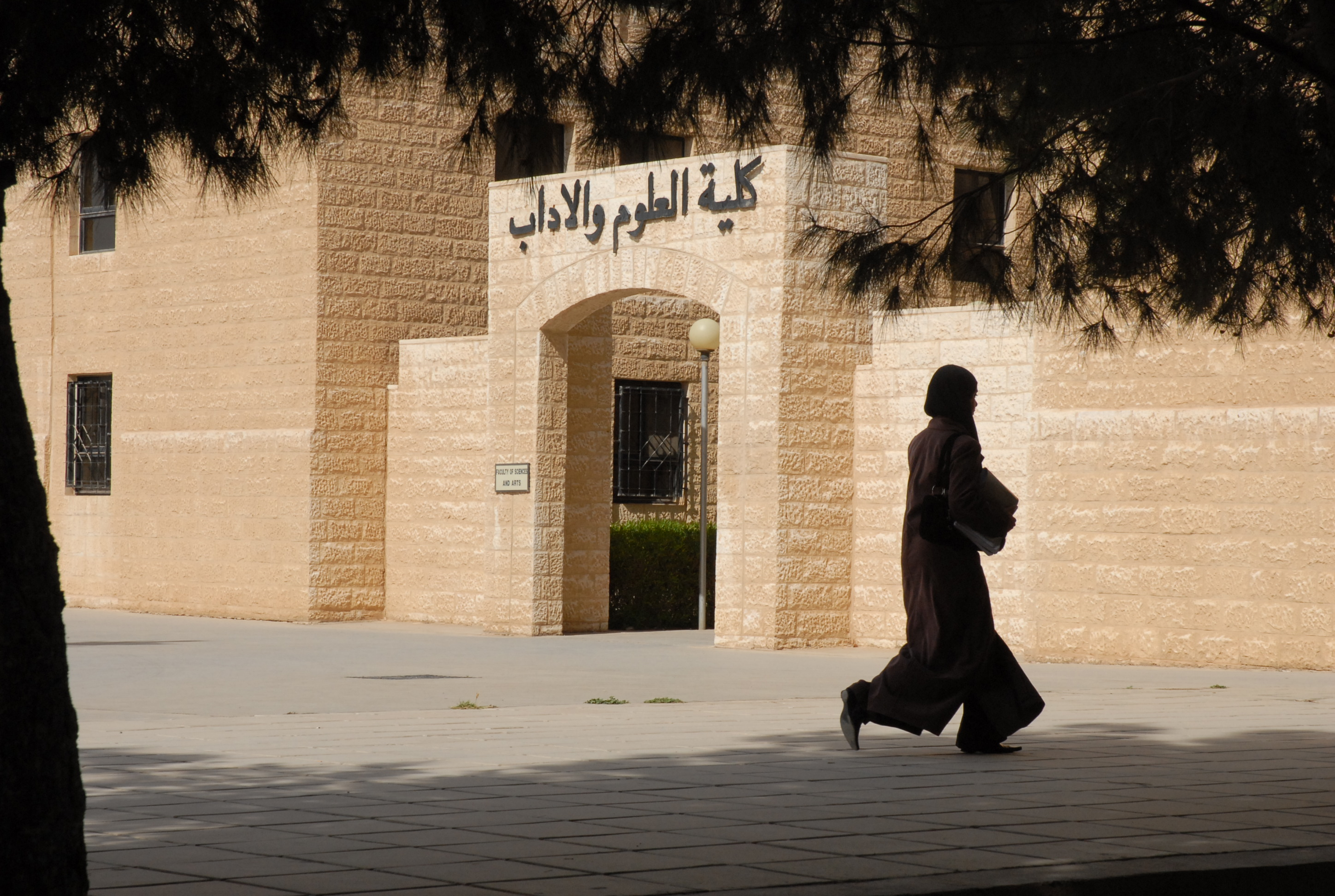
Faculty of Arts and Sciences

The Faculty of Arts has been active at the university since its establishment in 1995. The faculty offers courses in four majors:

- Arabic Language and Literature
- English Language and Literature
- Literature and Cultural Studies
- Humanities and Social Sciences, and Allied Humanities
- International Relations and Strategic Studies

The faculty provides MA degree in Arabic literature, Arabic linguistics, English Language and Literature, and Peace Studies and Conflict Management. Recently, an updated PhD program is established in Arabic Language and literature.

=== Faculty of Economics and Administrative Sciences ===
Faculty of Economics and Administrative Sciences

Since its establishment in September 1995, the Faculty of Economics and Administrative Sciences has various specialized programs that aim at achieving the educational goals of the faculty. Under this general interest, the faculty offers the following specialties: Banking and Financial sciences, Accounting, Business Administration, Economics, Financial Economics, administrative Information systems, Insurance and Risk Management, Hotel Management, Accounting and Commercial law. The faculty also provides the following master programs: Accounting and Funding, Business Administration, Production and Operations, Funding and Investment, Business Administration (a mutual program with the University of Texas/ Arlington.) The expansion of the BA courses has been positively reflected in the number of students who got enrolled. Statistically, 3880 enrollments have been reflected by the faculty during the year 2007/2008 compared to 123 enrollments for year 1995/1996. Currently, there are 174 students at the master level and 3706 students at the undergraduate level.

=== Faculty of Allied Health Sciences ===
Faculty of Allied Health Sciences

The Faculty of Allied Health Sciences (FAHS) was established in 1998 by the decree of the board of trustees in (2/1/98). The students' enrolment first start was in 2000 after a comprehensive study of the importance of such medical fields. The faculty provides a bachelor's degree in the following programs:

- Clinical Nutrition and dietetics
- Physical and Occupational Therapy
- Medical Imaging
- Medical Laboratory Sciences

It also provides MA degree in Medical Laboratory Science.

=== Faculty of Nursing ===
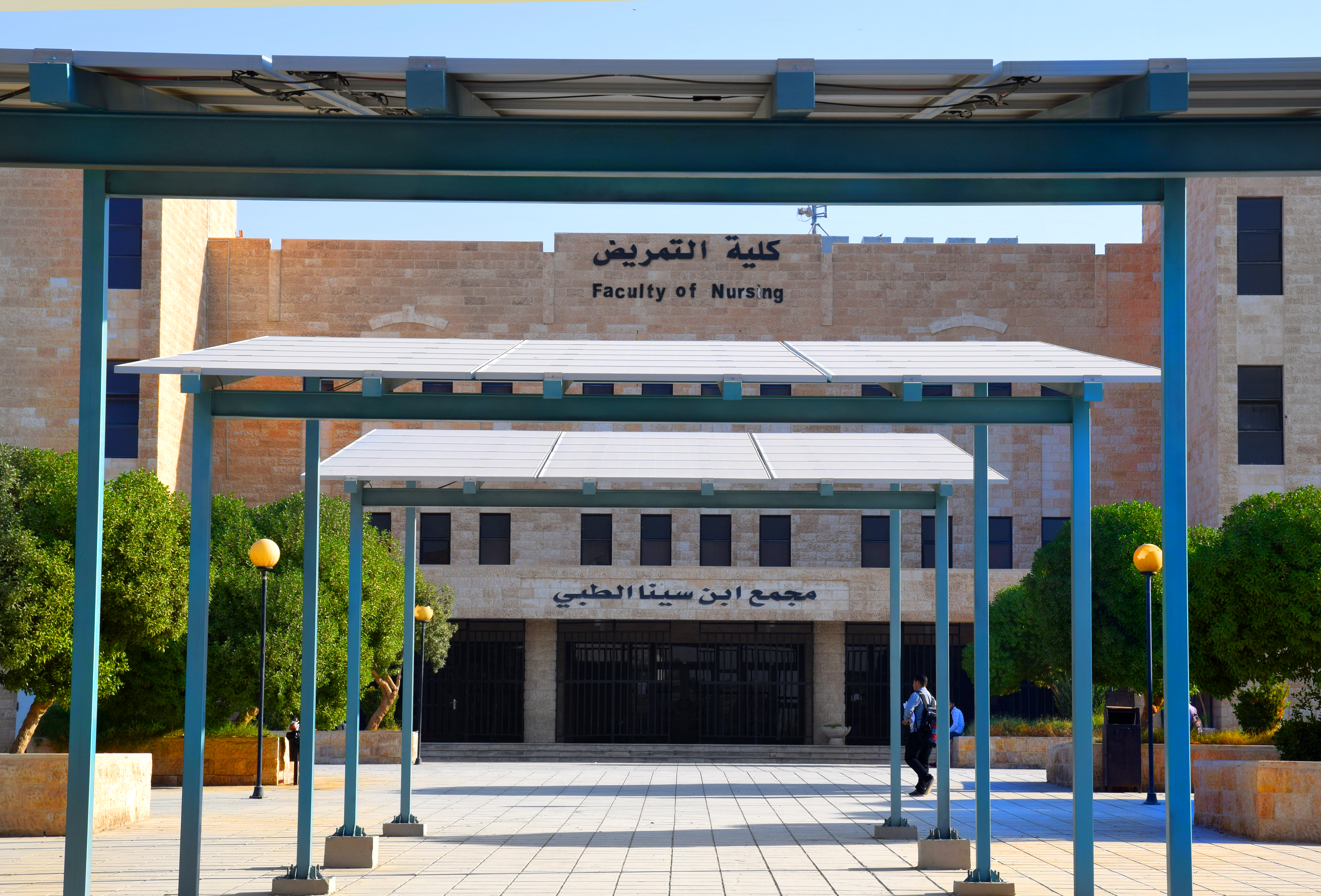
Faculty of Nursing

It was established 1999 to keep progress in the health sector in Jordan. In addition the Faculty provides one BA program in Nursing and two MA degree programs in: Cancer Nursing and Adult Health Nursing.

=== Faculty of Physical Education and Sport Sciences ===
Othman Bdeir sport hall

The Faculty of Physical Education and Sport Sciences was established in 1998. The Faculty was brought to life in order to meet the increasing needs of the local community and to keep abreast with. However, it was 1999/2000 when the faculty receives its first class. The faculty provides two BA degree programs in:

- Physical education and Sport Sciences
- Coaching and Sport Management

=== Faculty of Educational Sciences ===
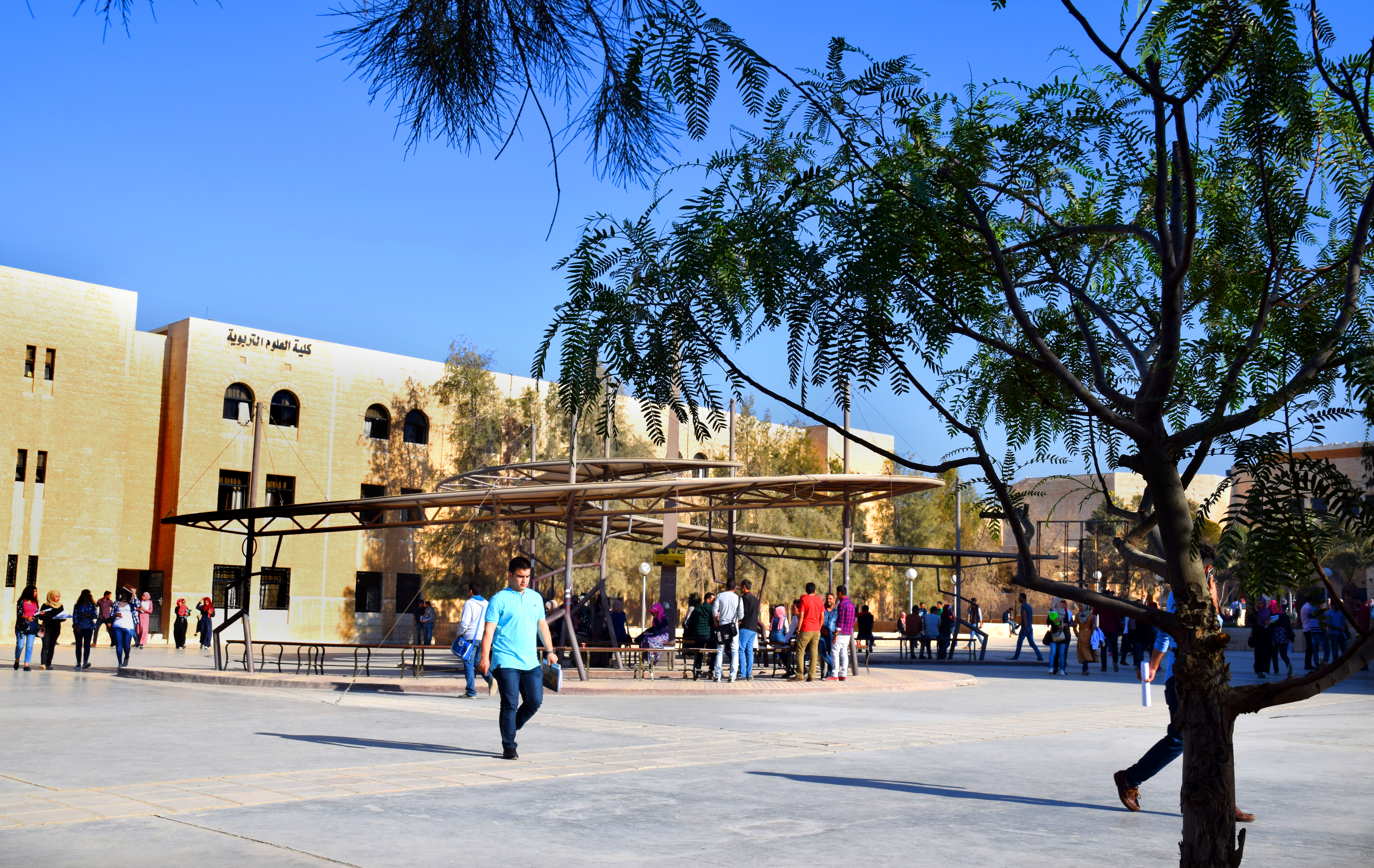
Faculty of Educational Sciences

The Faculty of Educational Sciences is the heart and soul of Hashemite University. The Faculty offers all undergraduate and graduate students a rigorous and forward-looking education in the educational, pedagogical sciences, and counseling psychology, and offers opportunities for students to major in many areas of study. EDS is a great place to explore fields of study that educate the person as a whole and open doors to careers that make a difference. The faculty was established in 1995/1996 offering the following programs on both BA and MA level degrees:

- Educational Psychology/ Scholastic Psychology
- Art Class teaching
- Educational Foundations and Administrations
- Teaching and Curriculum

=== The Faculty of Prince Hussein Bin Abdulla II of Information Technology (IT) ===
The Faculty of Prince Hussein Bin Abdulla II of Information Technology

The Faculty of Prince Hussein Bin Abdulla II of Information Technology at Hashemite University was established in 2001/2002 In response to the continuous development in information technology and to keep pace with times and rapid changes in this sector, and because of the increasing regional and international demand for highly qualified specialists in information technology.

The faculty provides a bachelor's degree in the following programs:

- Computer Science and Applications
- Computer Information Systems
- Software Engineering
- Business Management Technology

It also provides MA degree in: Information and Creativity Systems and Software Engineering.

=== Queen Rania Faculty for Childhood (QRFC) ===
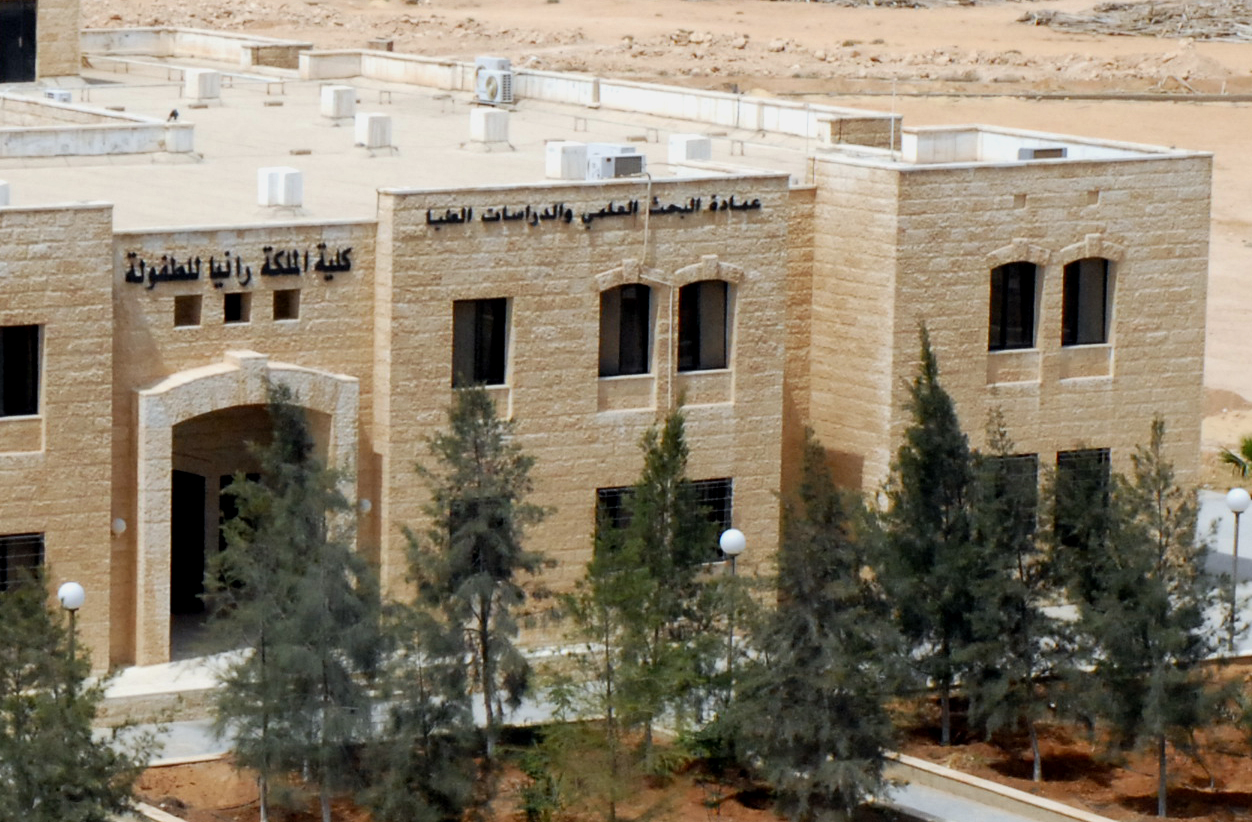
Queen Rania Faculty for Childhood beside Deanship of Scientific Research

The Faculty was established in 2002, as the first faculty dedicated to early childhood education and services in Jordan. The main goal of the Faculty is to equip and provide highly qualified graduates who are professionally and ethically ready to work with children and their families locally and regionally. The Faculty offers undergraduate degree in Early Childhood Education, Early Childhood Care, and in Special Education. It provides two BA Programs:

- Child Education
- Special Education

=== Queen Rania Faculty of Tourism and Heritage (QRITH) ===
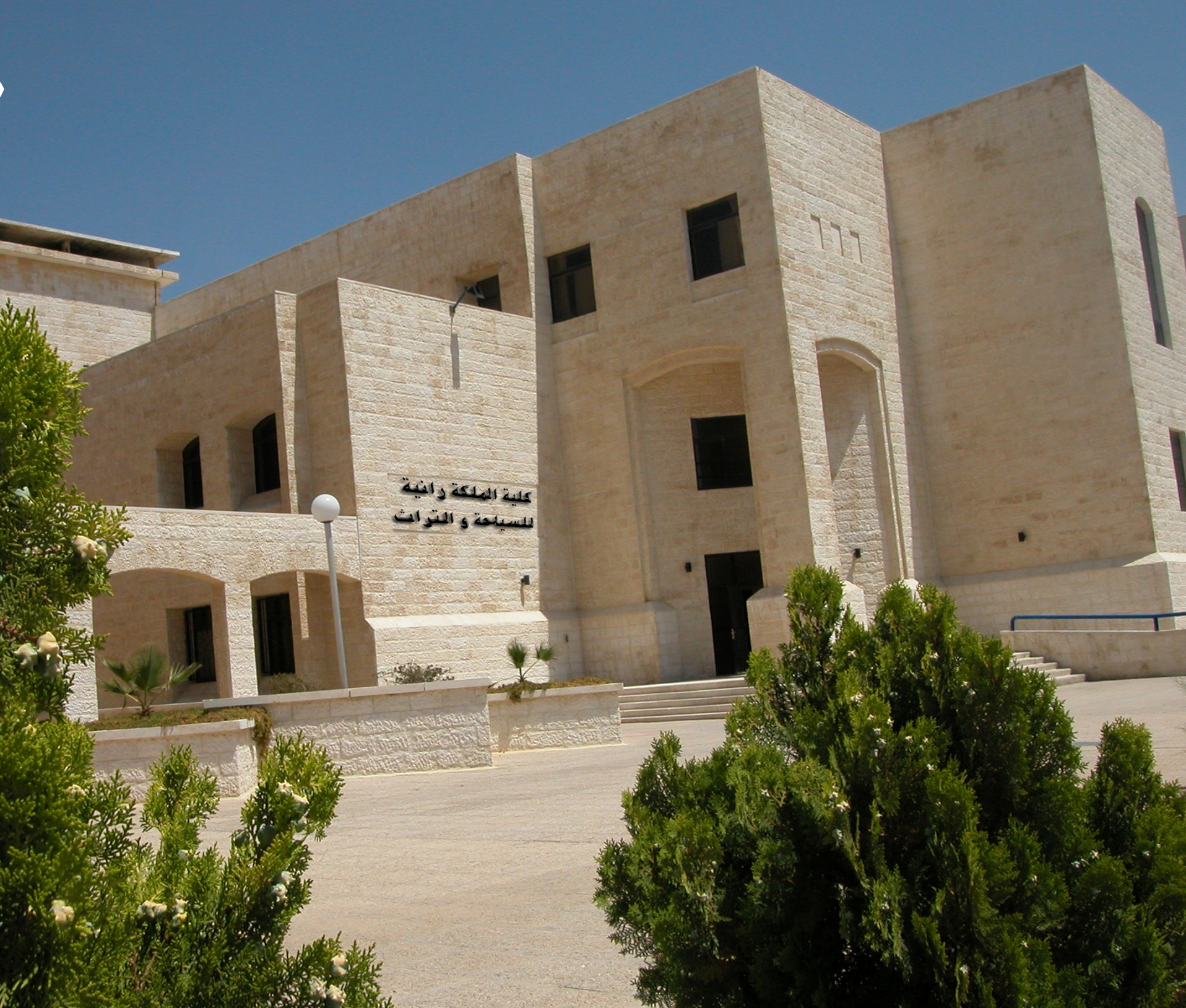
Queen Rania Faculty of Tourism and Heritage

The Queen Rania Faculty of Tourism and Heritage was established in 1999/2000 in the fields of tourism, conserving antiquities and managing cultural resources.

It provides BA degree Programs in :

- Conservative sciences
- Sustainable tourism
- Cultural Resources Management and Museology.

=== Faculty of Natural Resources and Environment ===
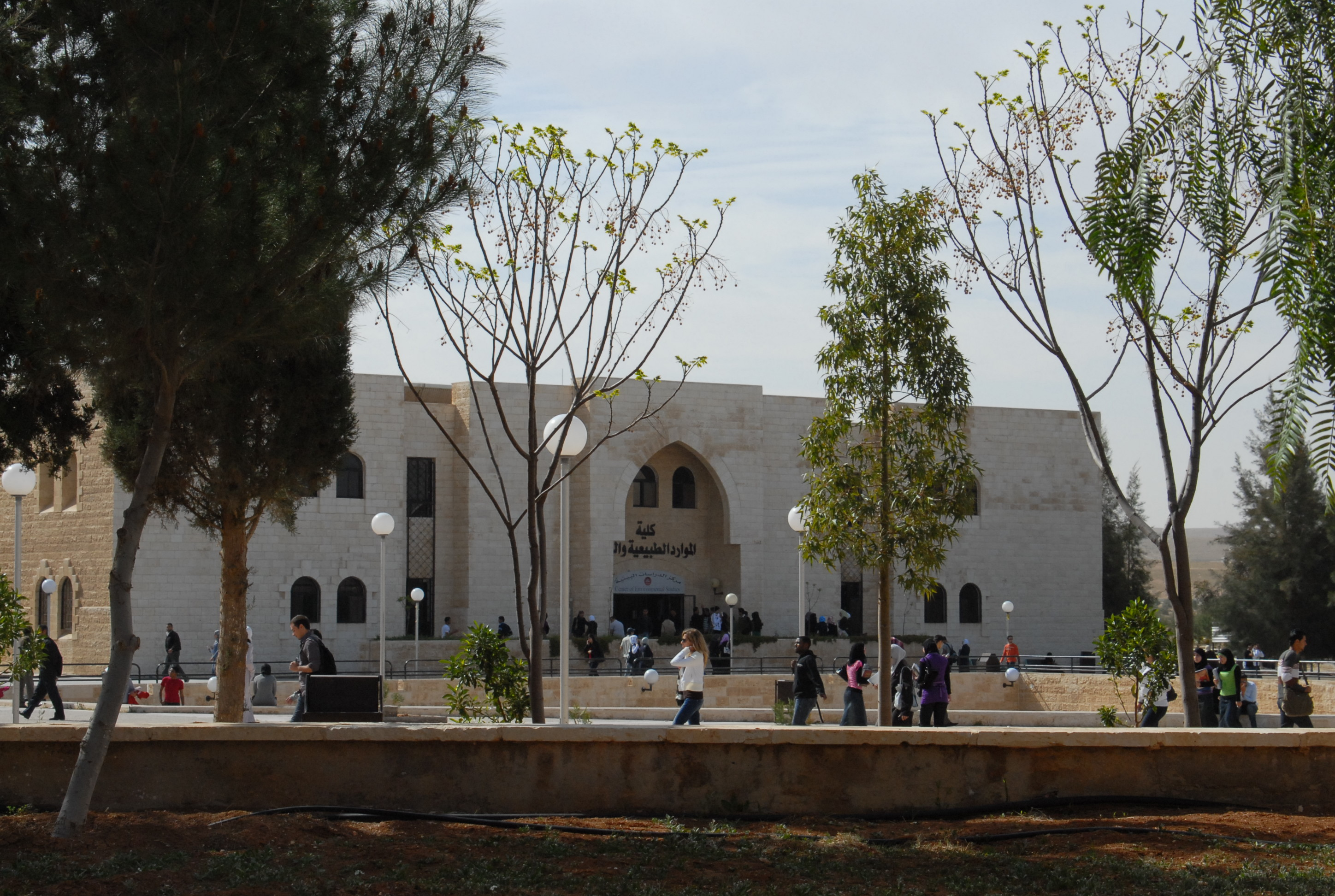
Faculty of Natural Resources and Environment

The Faculty of Natural Resources and Environment is an alternative name to The Institute of Land, Water and Environment which was established at the beginning of the year 1999. The objective of having such a faculty was to strengthen the involvement of the Hashemite University, these are its departments Department of Land Management and Environment, Department of Earth Sciences and Environment, and Department of Water Management and Environment.

=== Faculty of Pharmacy and Pharmaceutical sciences ===
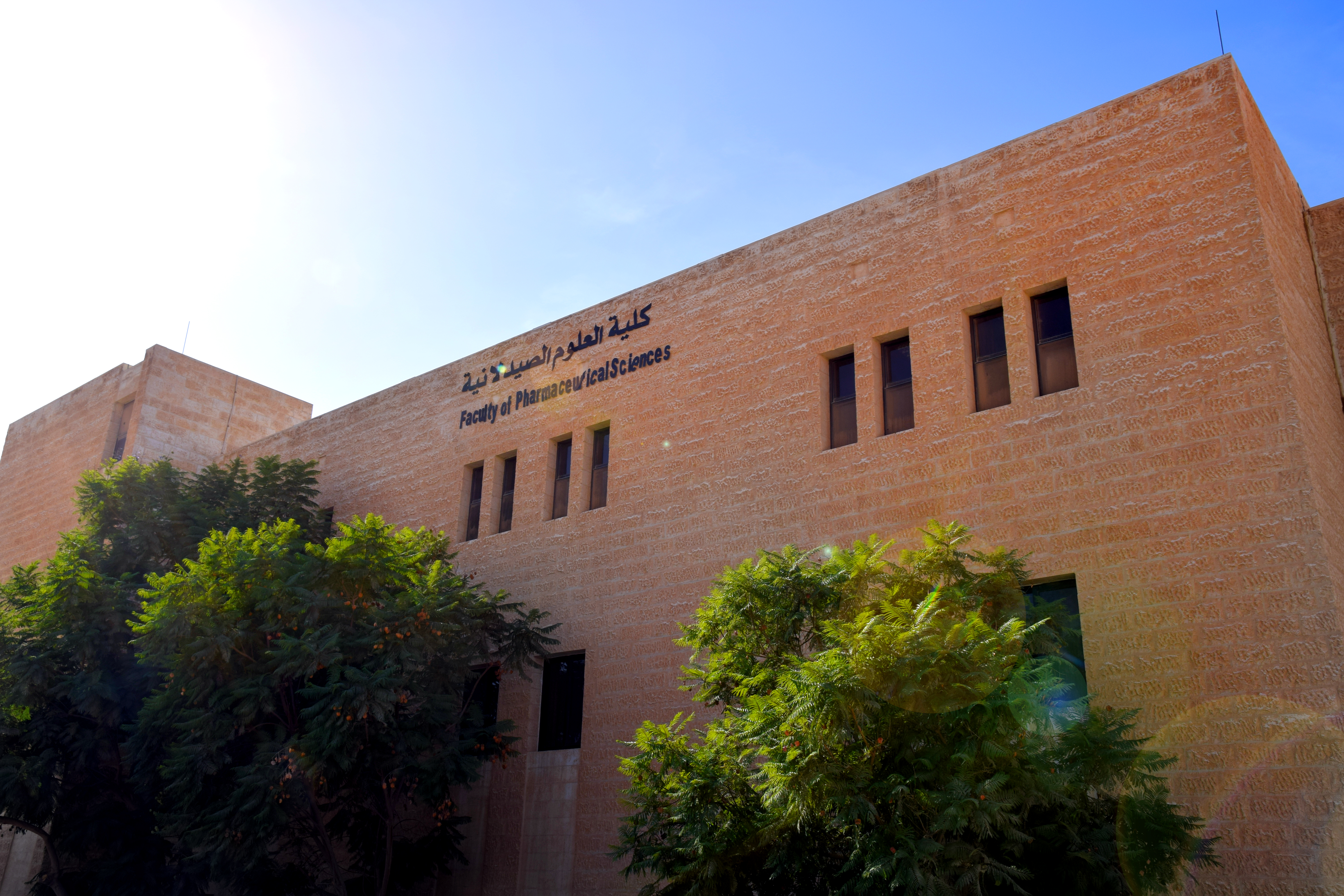
Faculty of Pharmacy and Pharmaceutical sciences

The university grants a bachelor's degree of pharmacy in two specialty tracks: the Administrative pharmacy and the Industrial pharmacy. This faculty accepted its first group of students during the fall semester of 2013. The faculty incorporated a hypothetical pharmacy established in 2015 to train students and enhance the practical aspect of the specialty.

=== Deanship of students' sffairs ===
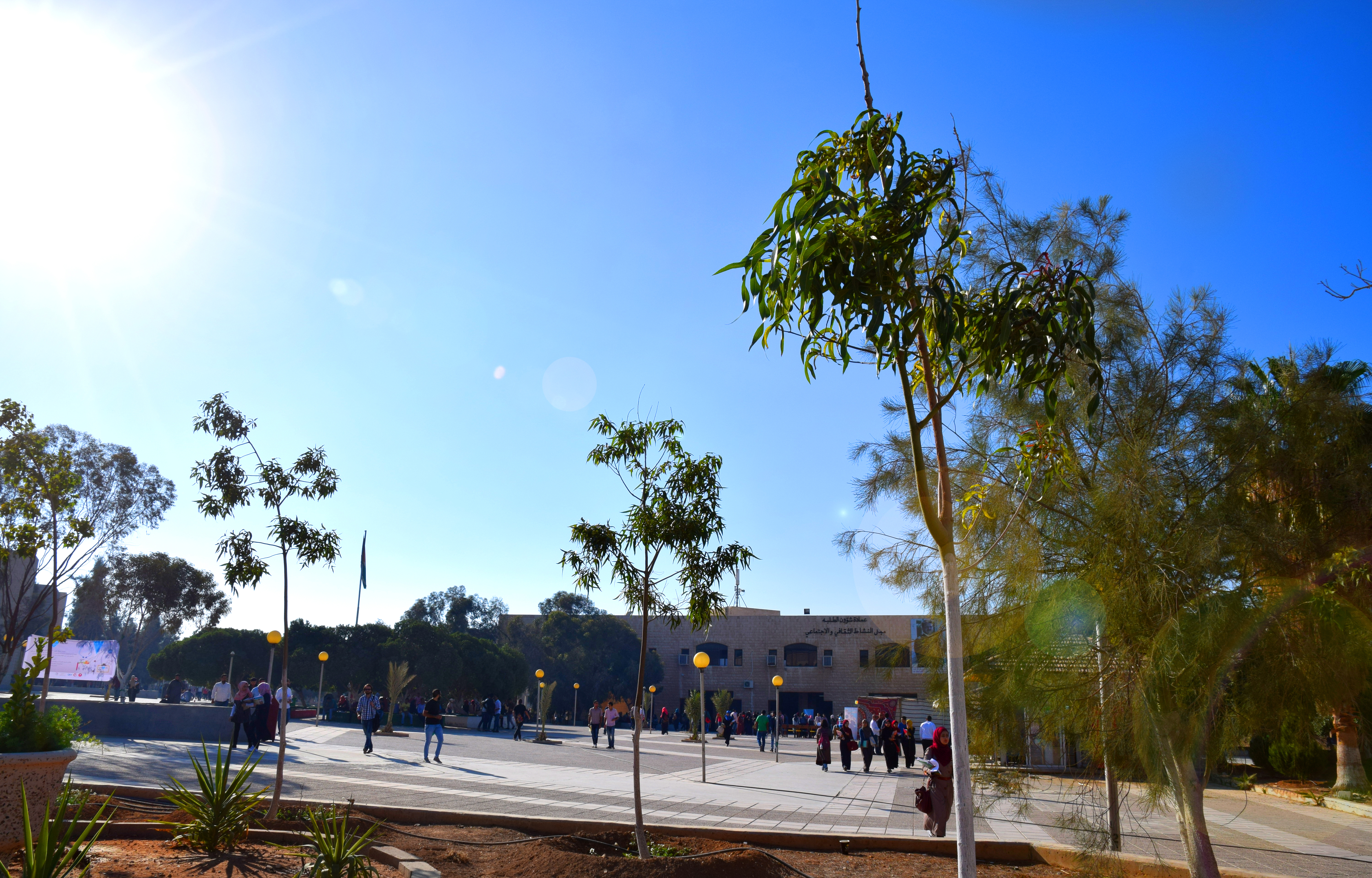
Deanship of Students' Affairs

The deanship was established in 1995-1996. It is mainly linked with students and the local community. It aims to develop students physically, mentally, socially and physiologically through fostering their personal characteristics in order to be the future leaders and be capable of bearing any responsibilities. The deanship aims at enhancing a sense of belonging and loyalty to the country (Jordan), to spread out the sense of group work, unity and sharing. In addition it strengthens national unity. The deanship is divided into seven departments.

1. Department of students' care and services which has two sections: one is associated with students' services and the other with students' health care.
2. Department of Athletic Activities.
3. Department of Cultural and Artistic Activities.
4. Department of Students Committees which includes many students clubs such as Arabic language club, debate club, economic club and digital arabic content club (works to enrich Arabic content on Wikipedia).
5. International Students Office.
6. Alumni Students Affairs Office.
7. King Abdullah II Fund for Development / Career Counseling.

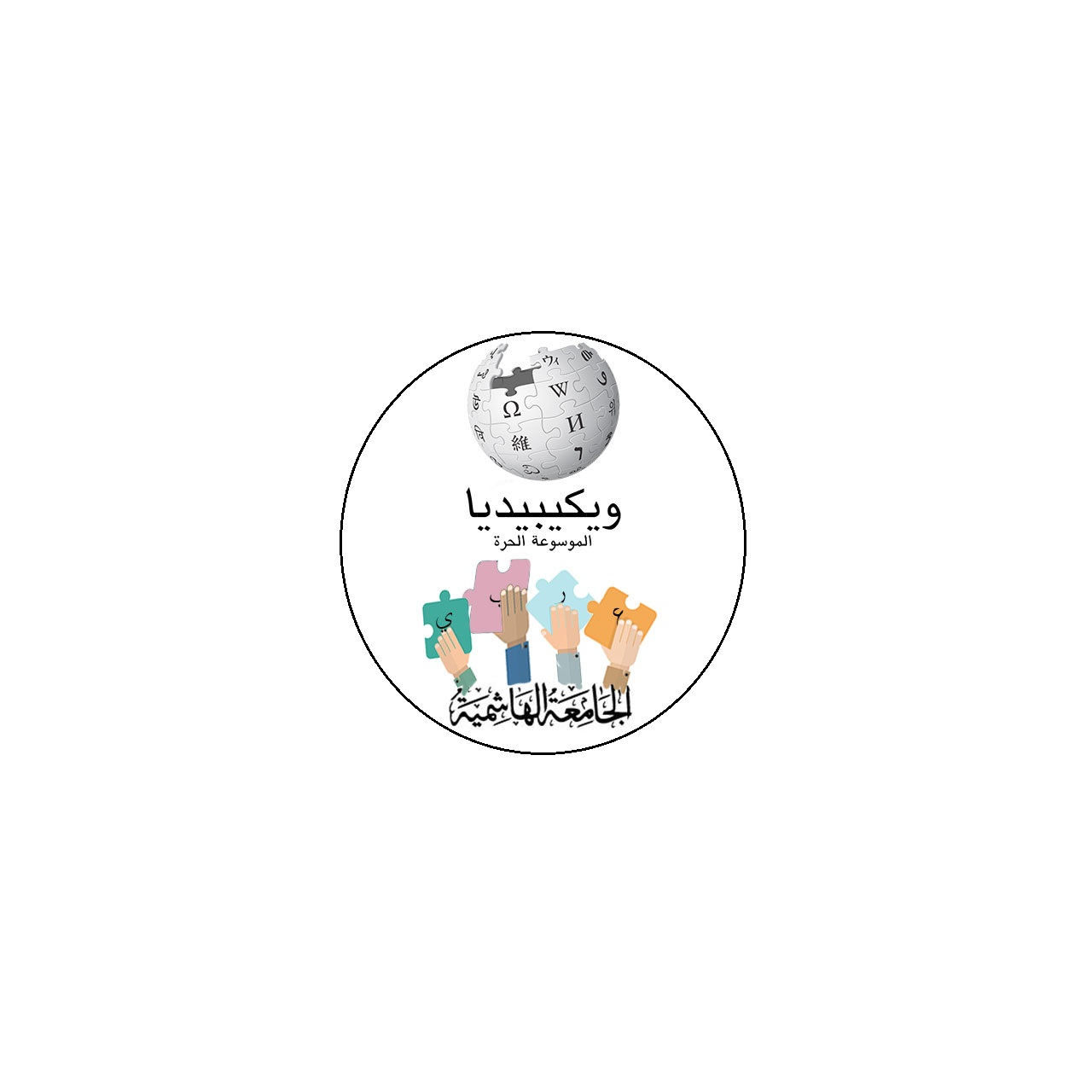
Wikipedia club at Hashemite University

There are different facilities related to the deanship such as: The Deanship's Facilities

1. Al-karamah Theater.
2. (Petra Hall): symposiums and lectures
3. Three students lounges.
4. Exhibition lounge.
5. Music room.
6. Drawing studio.
7. Student Service facilities such as (a supermarket, a restaurant, a post Office, and Xeroxing Center
8. (In- door) Multipurpose sport gymnasium and out-door Pitches. in addition, the deanship offers students loans and Counseling.

=== Deanship of scientific research ===
In collaboration with the Ministry of Higher Education and Scientific Research, The Hashemite University deanship of scientific research issues three international peer-reviewed scientific journals:

- Jordan Journal of Biological Sciences| Jordan Journal of Biological Sciences (JJBS) As of 2010, two volumes of this Journal have been issued since it was established, ISSN 1995-6673
- Jordan Journal of Mechanical and Industrial Engineering (JJMIE) An international peer-reviewed scientific journal, ISSN 1995-6665.
- The Jordan Journal of Earth and Environmental Sciences (JJEES) An International Peer-Revievwed Research Journal Issued by Higher Scientific Research Committee, the Ministry of Higher Education and Scientific Research (Jordan), and Deanship of Academic Research and Graduate Studies in The Hashemite University. ISSN 1995-6681 (LCCN 2008413429).

=== Faculty of Graduate Studies ===
The Hashemite University offers 35 programs in master, doctoral and high diploma. It also offers several professional diploma programs. The Faculty of Graduate Studies accepts outstanding students into various graduate programs, based on top-of-the-line, up-to-date study-plans that meet with the latest ever-developing international standards and market needs.

=== El-Hassan Bin-Talal faculty of arid land studies ===
It was named Arid Lands Academy then renamed as El-Hassan Bin-Talal faculty of arid land studies at the Hashemite University in Jordan launched as a tripartite collaborative endeavor between Jordan's Higher Council of Science and Technology, Hashemite University, and International Centre for Agricultural Research in the Arid Areas (ICARDA). El-Hassan Bin-Talal faculty of arid land studies born as an initiative of HRH Prince El-Hassan Bin-Talal. El-Hassan Bin-Talal faculty of arid land studies came to enhance the agricultural investments in the arid land of Jordan, which consist about 80% of Jordan area, so it can face the rapid demand of food productions due to rapid population growth. However, the faculty proposed to transfer its experience in the arid lands investments to the countries that face the same conditions of Jordan. The mission of the El-Hassan Bin-Talal faculty of arid land studies is to provide spearheading solutions for unbalance use for the natural resources and environment by developing interactive educational and research programs. These decisive results to be use in mitigate the climate change effect, natural resource degradation, and depleted water resources and increase the arid land productivity in Jordan. Furthermore, El-Hassan Bin-Talal faculty of arid land studies tactics to be internationally resource for sustainable development of arid lands by collaborating with other international institutions and attracting scientists and students from across the world. El-Hassan Bin-Talal faculty of arid land studies vision is establishing an exceptional education curriculum that grants bachelor's degrees in the arid lands studies including range-livestock science and management, natural resources and the environment, economic development, policy analysis, and rural sociology. El-Hassan Bin-Talal faculty of arid land studies objectives are to impart knowledge from the scientist from Arab countries and the world on the sustainable development of arid lands, and to generate an entrepreneurial approach in solving the problems of over-use and misuse of natural resources in arid land by involving local communities, which will involve them in decision-making and open new opportunities for employment.

== Library ==
The library contains nearly 250 thousand paper materials and about 430 billion a computerized database of scientific documents in various aspects of knowledge. The library also offers a computerized and comprehensive system for circulating books depending on radio waves for identification.

=== Main library ===
The library has undergone automation project offering computerized library information covering systems of acquisition, cataloging and circulation services using the HORIZON database management system. The library is a member in the consortium of Jordanian Public University libraries (JoPULs). Jordan Library and Information Association, Arab Federation of University Libraries, and the International Federation of Library Associations and Institutions (IFLA), and the Center Of Excellence (COE).

=== Special-purpose libraries ===
- The Medical Library

It is located in the Ibn Sina Medical complex in the Medical college section and houses medical books.

- The Childhood Library

The Childhood Library houses a special collection on childhood, children, family and related subjects to serve the information needs of staff and students at the Faculty of Queen Rania for Childhood. Houses a total of 7,000 books and periodicals.

- Social Work Library

Social Work Library (SWL) was launched within the context of a cooperation agreement between the Social Work Center at Hashemite University and Abdel-Hameed Shoman Foundation.

- American Studies and Resources Corner

For resources on American Literature, Heritage, American Foreign and Domestic Policies, American Economy, American Society and Cities, Music and Arts, and Famous American Characters. It also organizes digital video conferencing with affiliated universities and institutions in the United States.

- British Studies and Resources Corner

For English literature, English Language, and related subjects.

== Units and centers ==
=== The academic centers and the specialized and services offices ===
- The clinical skills education and testing center (CSETC) for training the students of medicine: this center was established on 17 July 2012, and it is considered as the first of its kind in Jordan. The center aims at enhancing students' self-confidence and reducing the psychological barrier in the interaction between doctor and patient where the student learns the clinical skills from the first year of studying. The center has two laboratories:

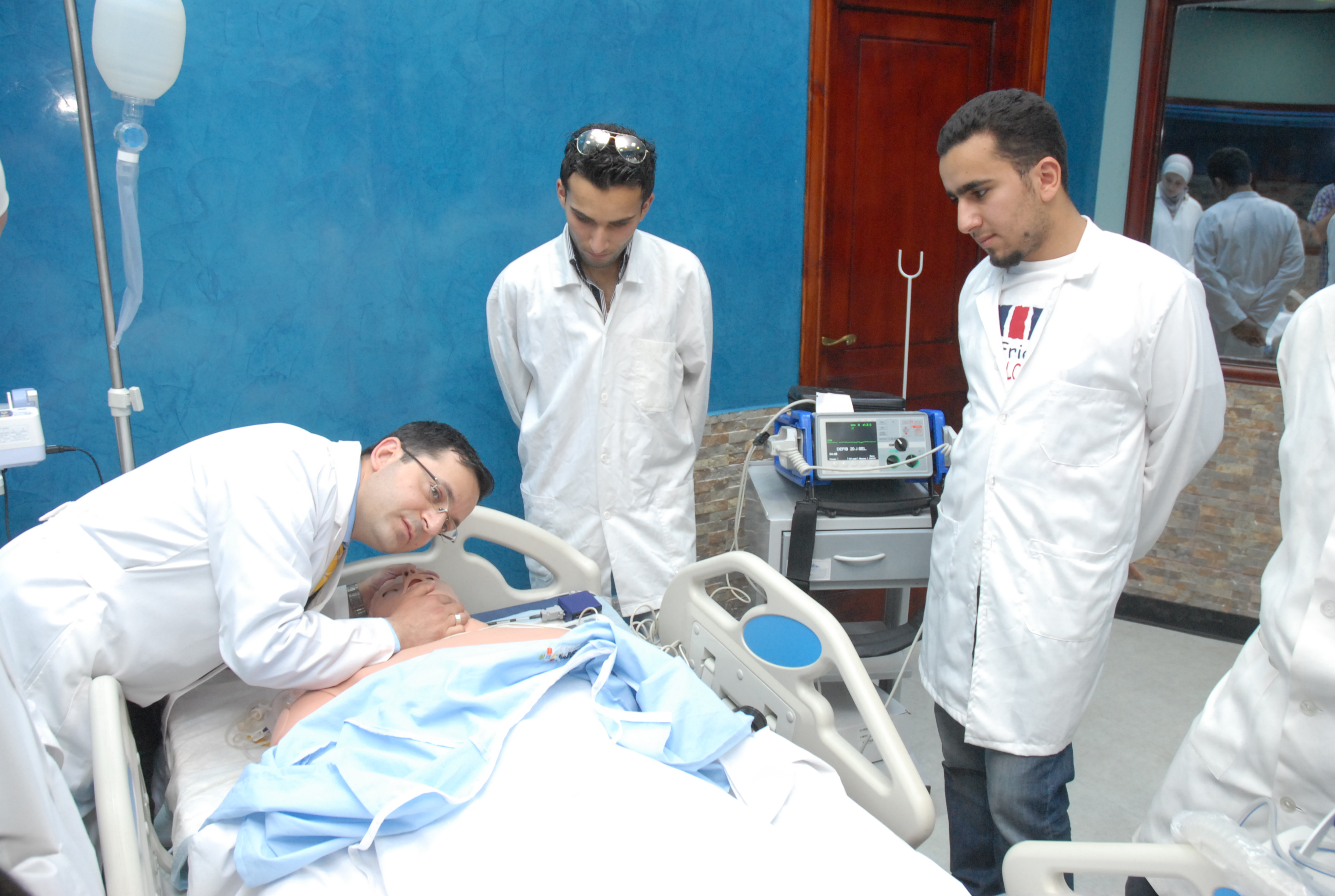
Clinical skills education and testing centre

1. Doll Lab: this laboratory has a control room and a video room where educating videos are displayed for students in addition to a room where students can observe the college or professor performing medical skills and dealing with the patient. The lab also includes a room for the observer and a doll which acts like a real patient who performs human vital physiological processes such as pulsing, breathing, defecating, pressure and light sensing, and it is connected with a computer from which it the pathological case can be selected from a computerized list through a computer program as it includes 59 pathological scenarios which are able to be increased by preparing other possible pathological cases according to the training and educating need. The doll simulates wounds bleeding as the blood can get out of it as is the case with real wounds. Moreover, the doll reacts with anesthesia, and it has the ability to defecate other liquids from the body like urine and mucus as it is provided with liquids and gases regularly from the main providing room. It also can react to 250 kinds of medicine, their effect as well as their side effects as it is given the medicine through a digital injection that has a barcode and contains a liquid with the same color of the medicine. The doll is capable of being Cardiopulmonary resuscitated since it is connected with the respiratory system and the electric shocks device. The Electrocardiography is displayed on a screen which is connected to the doll in addition to two cameras, one of which records students while they are dealing with the medical case and the other records the doll and its response for the doctor and it shows their pictures on the main screen in the control room. The doll is also capable of producing sounds as those used to express pain and it also can ask for a medicine, food, or for seeing a doctor.
2. Sub-Laboratory clinics: the Lab consists of 23 medical training clinics, each of which contains an office, a medical bed and a computer connected to the Internet which contains an electronic medical library, in addition to a doll which differs from one clinic to another. Each clinic teaches the students a certain medical skill as blood pressure checks, the spinal cord puncture, ear checking, hearing the heart sounds, identifying the intravenous entrances, venipuncture, intravenous solutions, giving medicine through the intramuscularly injection, bones or venous. Also they learn the wounds suture, medical sutures and all kinds of surgical thread, In addition to dealing with new born babies, and the anal checking. The lab contains two rooms to monitor and follow up the students during the learning process by a faculty member to assess their practice and perfection and their behavior during the patient's diagnosis and preview. The lab also includes two rooms for communication skills provided with a display screen to watch educational videos or recordings for students during their training in addition to a smart board. It also includes a trauma man through which the student learns the surgical intervention in emergency case, like ascites, installation chest tube and surgical input by larynx.

The clinical skills education and testing center won the first prize in Al Hassan Bin Talal Award for Scientific Excellence which is managed by The Higher Council for Science and Technology.

- Center for Academic Quality Assurance (CAQA): The center is responsible for approving the academic quality of the study programs in accordance with national and international standards, as well as the analysis and development of strategic plans for the different college programs.
- Social Work Center: Social Work Center has established in 2006 and provided a number of services such as establishing training units, consultations, and conducting studies and research. In addition, it spreads awareness related social work.
- Center for Environmental Studies (CES)
- Center of Studies, Consultation and Continuing Education (CSCCS): The center consists of three departments: 1) Training department which designs and establish training programs. 2) Studies department which gives consultation and runs studies.
- Linguistics Center Which is located in the Arts and Sciences College.
- Center for Information and Communication Technology, The E-learning Information Technology: This center was established in the late 1997 in order to computerize the university systems. It consists of three departments: Programming Department with its applications, Networking, Communications and Technical Services Department, and The E-learning Department. This center provides the students with the ability to access the Internet by using username and password that are taken from laboratories administrators, and helps with printing service and conducting electronic exams service, in addition to courses electronic registration service and finding out students' grades and study schedules. The center has computerized many academic systems and applications: Admission and Registration System, Faculty Members System, Students Affairs System, King Abdullah Fund System, Students Fund System, Scientific Research and Graduate Studies System, The Electronic Exams System, Students Accounts System, The Hosted Departments Systems such as (The Royal Grant, Military Service, and Cultural Counselor). As well as the Administrative Systems such as Human Resources and Salaries System, Debtsand Electronic Archiving System, Health Insurance System, and University Administration System. It also has computerized many Internet applications including university's website, The Student Portal, Student's Guardian Portal, Staff Portal, Business Collaborators Portal, Hospitals Portal, and Electronic Publishing System, Admission Portal (Enrollment Applications). The center also contributed to the development of some systems to serve the local community such as the development of the financial system, Subscribers System, Certificate of Origin System, and Guarantees System in Zarqa and Mafraq Chamber of Commerce.

== Students ==
=== Off-campus housing ===
The university offers housing for girls only in the city of Abdallah ben Adelaziz (Madent Elsharq) located 10 minutes away east from Zarqa city.

== The presidency ==
The succession for the presidency at the university includes:

- Mohammed Hamdan 1992-1998.
- Anwar Batikhi 1998 to 2002.
- Rueda Maaytah 31 July 2002 to 26 September 2002 and the period from 20 September 2010 to 24 October 2011.
- Hakam Al-Hadidi 18 December 2002 to 5 December 2004.
- Omar Alshdefat 2004-2007.
- Abdul Rahim Hunaiti February 2008 to 4 March 2009.
- Suleiman Arabiyat from 4 March 2009 to 19 September 2010.
- Kamal Bani Hani

the current president of the Hashemite University is Prof. Fawwaz M. Al-Abed Al-Haq.

== University's projects ==
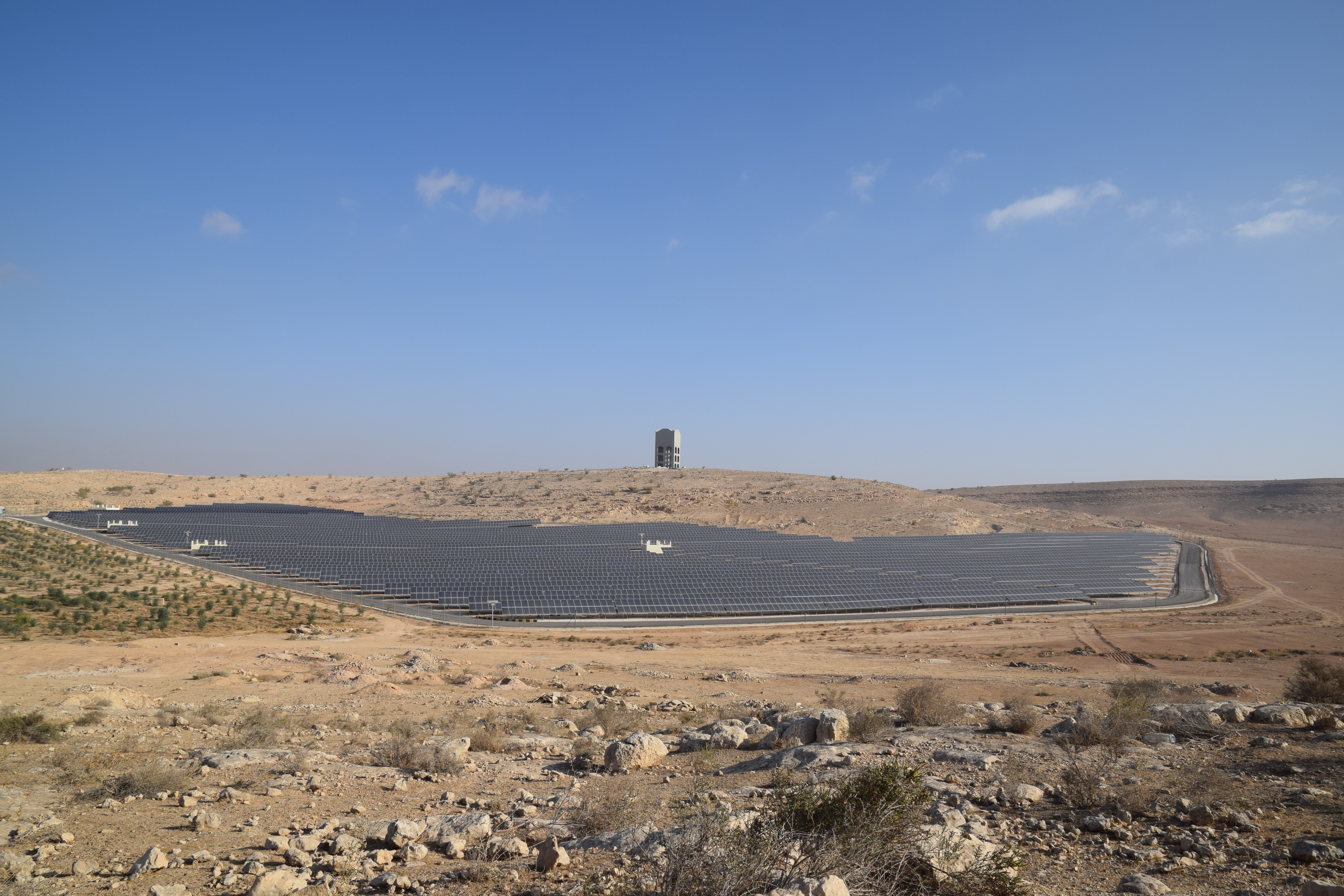
The Hashemite sun project

- The Hashemite sun project: The university set a project to generate solar power under the name of the sun of the Hashemite which produces an electrical power capacity of 5 MW, covering twice the university's need of electricity. The project's opening ceremony was attended by Prince El Hassan bin Talal. In October 2017, the university was recognized for its sun project and won the golden prize of 3rd Emirates Energy Award in the category of "Large Energy Project" (more than 500 Kilowatt).
- North Classrooms' Compound project: the work began on the project on 12 October 2014 and laid the foundation stone on 4 January 2016 where the compound was named King Hareth the Fourth Complex the builder of Al-khaznah at Petra. The compound was fully established and funded from the budget of the university. The cost was approximately 10 million Jordanian dinars with a total area of 16 thousand square meters in addition it includes sections and deanships of both the Faculty of Queen Rania for Childhood and Queen Rania Institute of Tourism and Heritage and the faculty of educational sciences. The complex consists of 35 classrooms that can accommodate 100 students each, along an amphitheatre that can accommodate 650 students and two more amphitheaters for 250 students each. In addition to 100 offices for faculty members. The total capacity of the complex is 4560 students per hour. The facades of the complex were made of a natural white stone and the Karaki stone along with travertine.
- South Classrooms' Compound project: The project started on 10 December 2014 and the foundation stone was laid for the project on 6 May 2015 funded by Abu Dhabi Fund for Development in the United Arab Emirates as part of the grant of the Gulf with nearly 11 million Jordanian dinars for total area of 18,500 square meters and with a capacity of four thousand students per hour. The building consists of three floors and a partial fourth floor and a basement. There are 35 classrooms that are equipped with educational technologies, each fits 70 to 100-students beside the classrooms there is a main amphitheatre that can accommodate 650 students and two others for 250 students each. in addition to 16 engineering studio and a number of laboratories and 100 offices for academics and administrators.
- The Faculty of Pharmaceutical Sciences Building: in November 2016 The university signed an agreement to create a building with a total area of 21,860 square meters at a cost of approximate 15 million Jordanian dinars. The building consists of four floors including a number of interactive classroom, advanced laboratories, as well as a pharmaceutical library, an interactive theater, a cafeteria, and offices for faculty and administrators.

== Student's council elections ==
The university applied the open percentage lists since the 14th council that was conducted according to that system on 4 December 2014. The Hashemite University is considered the first Jordanian institution that applies such system. The numbers of seats reached 66 chairs in the fifteenth council as the percentage was one to 600 students. The university conducted to lists:

- University list: in which the university prepares an independent election unit with 14 chairs.
- College list: in which each college prepares an independent unit with 52 chairs distributed among the other colleges depending on the size of the college and the number of its students; as the faculty of engineering got 8 chairs as it is the largest college with the largest number of students, followed by the faculty of economics and administration with 7 chairs then the faculties of art and science with 4 chairs each, and the other remaining faculties got 3 chairs each, but the faculty of pharmaceutical sciences got only one chair because it was freshly established.

== Financial status ==
The Hashemite University is free from fiscal deflect and debt. It hasn't got any financial support from the government during the current administration under the supervision of the president Dr. Kmal Bani Hani. It has saved about JD7.1 million yearly compared to the previous administrations. This has been accomplished through reducing the expenses that don't negatively affect the teaching process. The reductions were for example: controlling overtime working hours for the academic and administrative staff, reducing the expenses of the university's celebrations, checking the sick leaves, and developing the programs of information technology throughout the university's technological center instead of getting it from outside the university. The university has also suspended all the administrative occupations for about 4 years. The number of the academic employees compared to the administrative is 1-1.5. The university has increased its fiscal revenue through financing some projects from outside resources like the university's Masjed which was built at the expense of Shaikh Salim Al-Mazroie from United Arab Emiratis. In addition to establishing a virtual pharmacy to train pharmacy students on the expense of Dwakom Company. The value of state contributions to the university is JD26 million in debts to the state. This number dropped in .2015 because of the lack of a deficit in the university's budget.

== Affiliations and international agreements and classifications ==
- International Association of Universities
- Federation of the Universities of the Islamic World
- Mediterranean Universities Union
- Association of Arab Universities

The Hashemite University was ranked the tenth among the best universities in the Middle East according to the scientific research impact and was ranked one of the best 300 universities in the world. The university obtained 251-300 in BRICS & Emerging Economies 2017.

== Councils ==
=== Dean's Council ===
This council at the Hashemite University consists of the president and 18 deans and three vice-presidents. The proportion of females in the Deans Council is 40 percent, it is an indication of the presence of the females in the academic, administrative and research areas.

=== The board of trustees ===
The council consists of a chairman and 12 members of the first university degree holders. the Board meets at least once a month, and whenever the needed. It handles several tasks, including drawing up the university's general policy, and approve the annual plan and appointing deans and vice presidents and the heads of branches at the university as well as the establishment of colleges, institutions and departments of with its scientific centers followed by creating of disciplines and academic programs by merging or canceling them. The Board also determines the tuition fees in various disciplines upon the recommendation of the university's council and determining the annual budget of the university after the approval of the university's council. The board includes two committees, one for academic affairs and is composed of five members and the second for Administrative and Financial Affairs and is composed of three members.

=== University council ===
The board consists of a chairman and 43 members 18 deans and 15 representatives from the university colleges who are chosen by election as well as managers of each of these units: the library and the Financial Unit, the Centre for Information Technology as well as two representatives from the local community and the other 3 for the students, two on them are still a student and the other is a graduate with three vice-presidents.

=== The council's secretariat unit ===
The unit began its work in 1992 as the secretariat of the Royal Committee of the university then moved its business to take over the three boards of the university's secretariat: the Council of Deans, University's Council and the board of trustees as well as the secretariat for the Appointment and Promotion Committee and the Committee of scientific research support. The Circle became autonomous in 1998. (Note: there is another board called board of directors: The Council was established as an initiative from Dr. Kamal al-Din Bani Hani the president of the university for the purpose of making a coordination among administrative bodies and enhancing the speed of horizontal integration among these bodies. The council consists of all the centers' directors and departments and administrative units at the university. The mission is to study all the issues that the administrative board comes across at the university and to develop and improve their performance while providing all the necessary facilities for the conduct of the administrative work at the university where they also discuss all topics that are related to the staff and the function of financial issues and procurement, computer services and other administrative services as the Council holds meetings on regular basis.)

== See also ==
- List of Islamic educational institutions

== Gallery ==
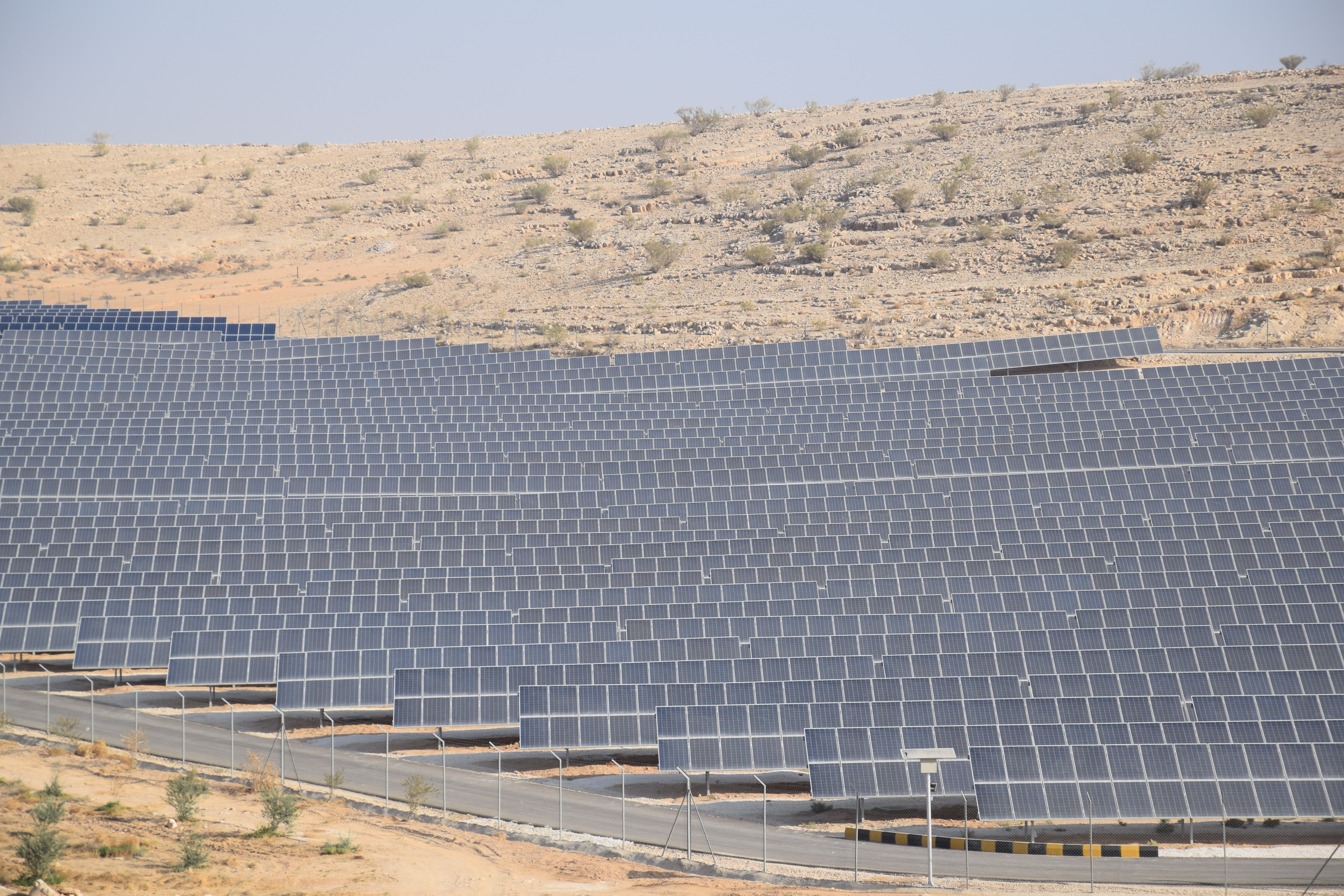
Solar energy project at Hashemite University - near view

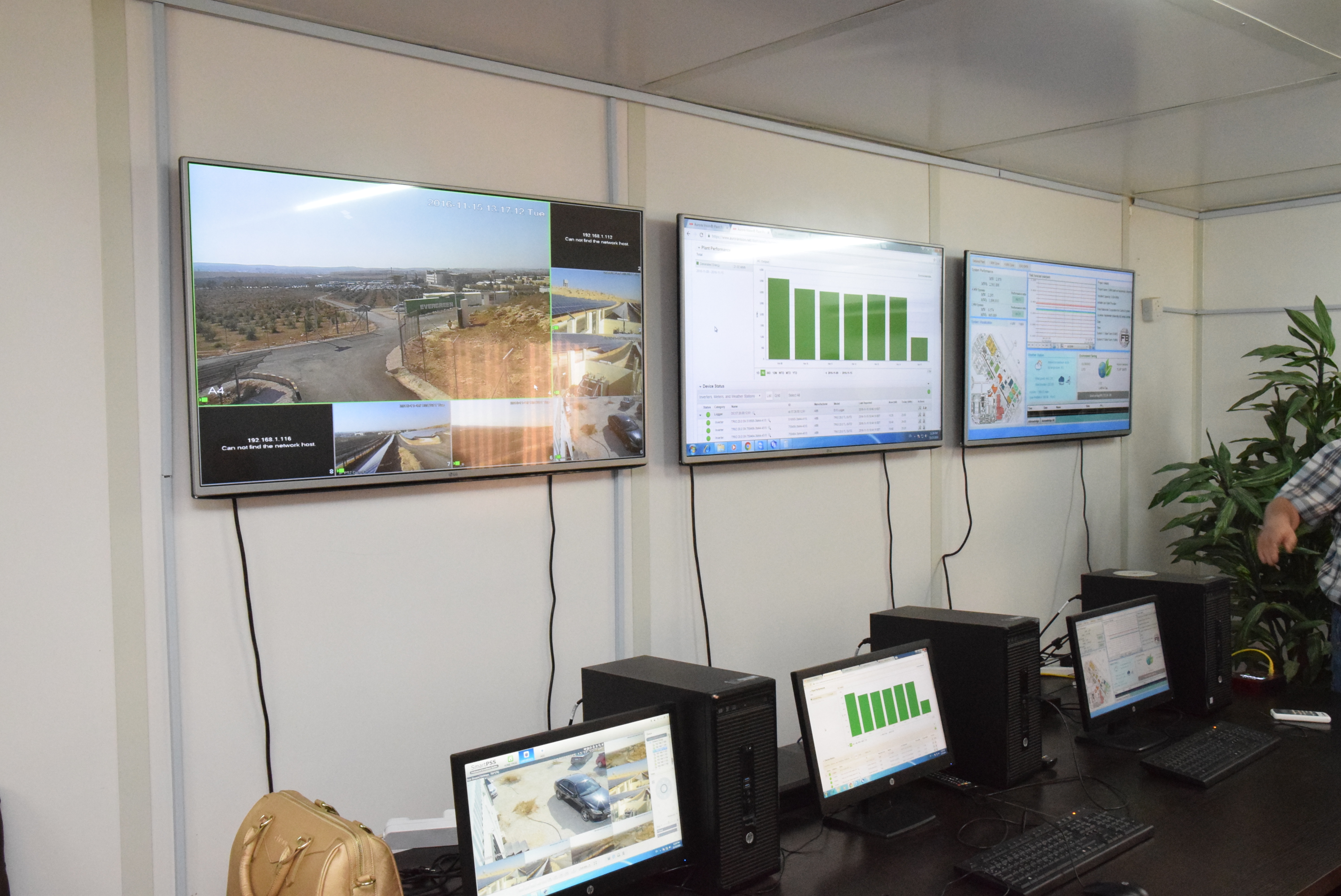
Control room of solar energy project

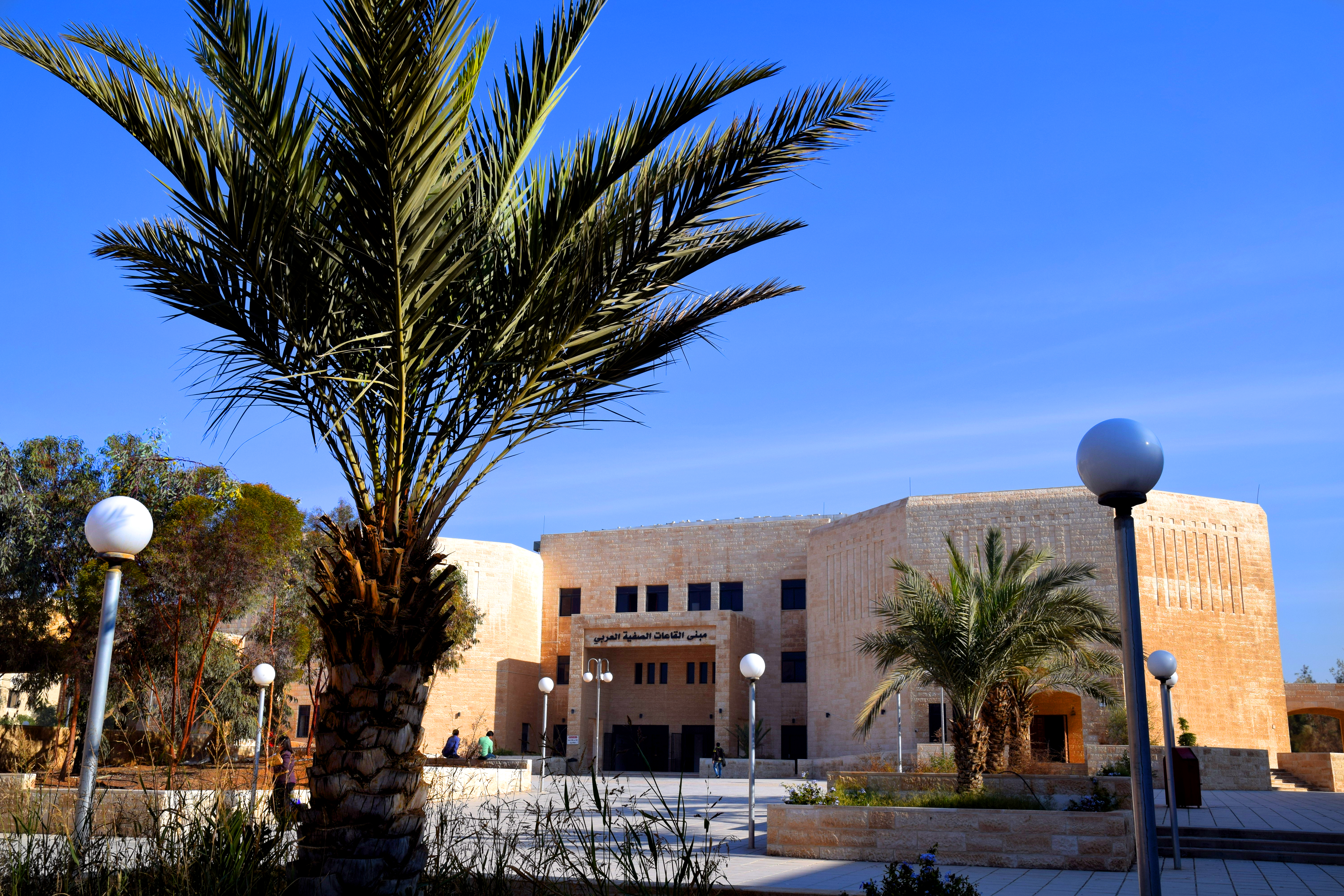
Western classrooms building

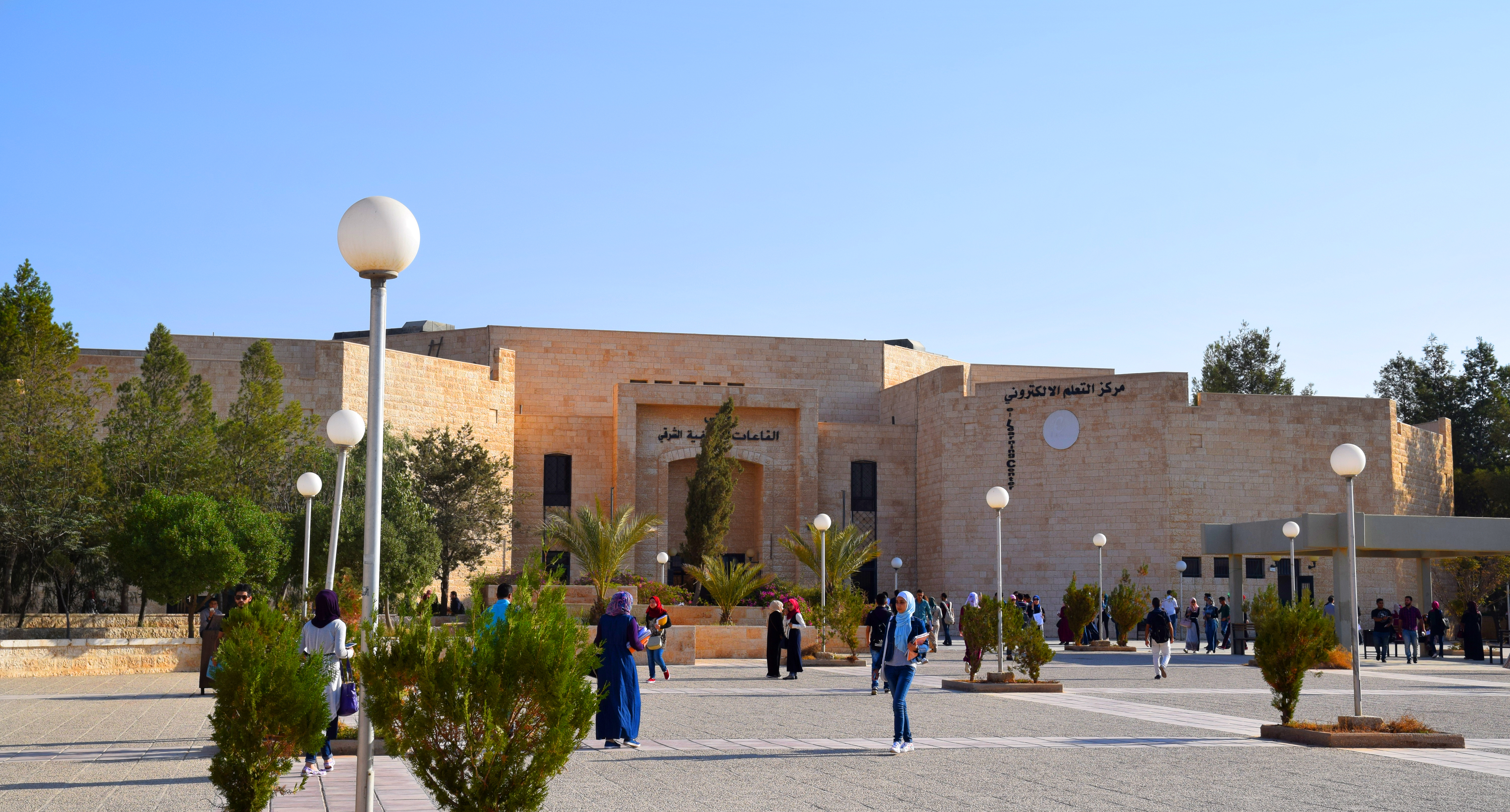
Eastern classrooms building

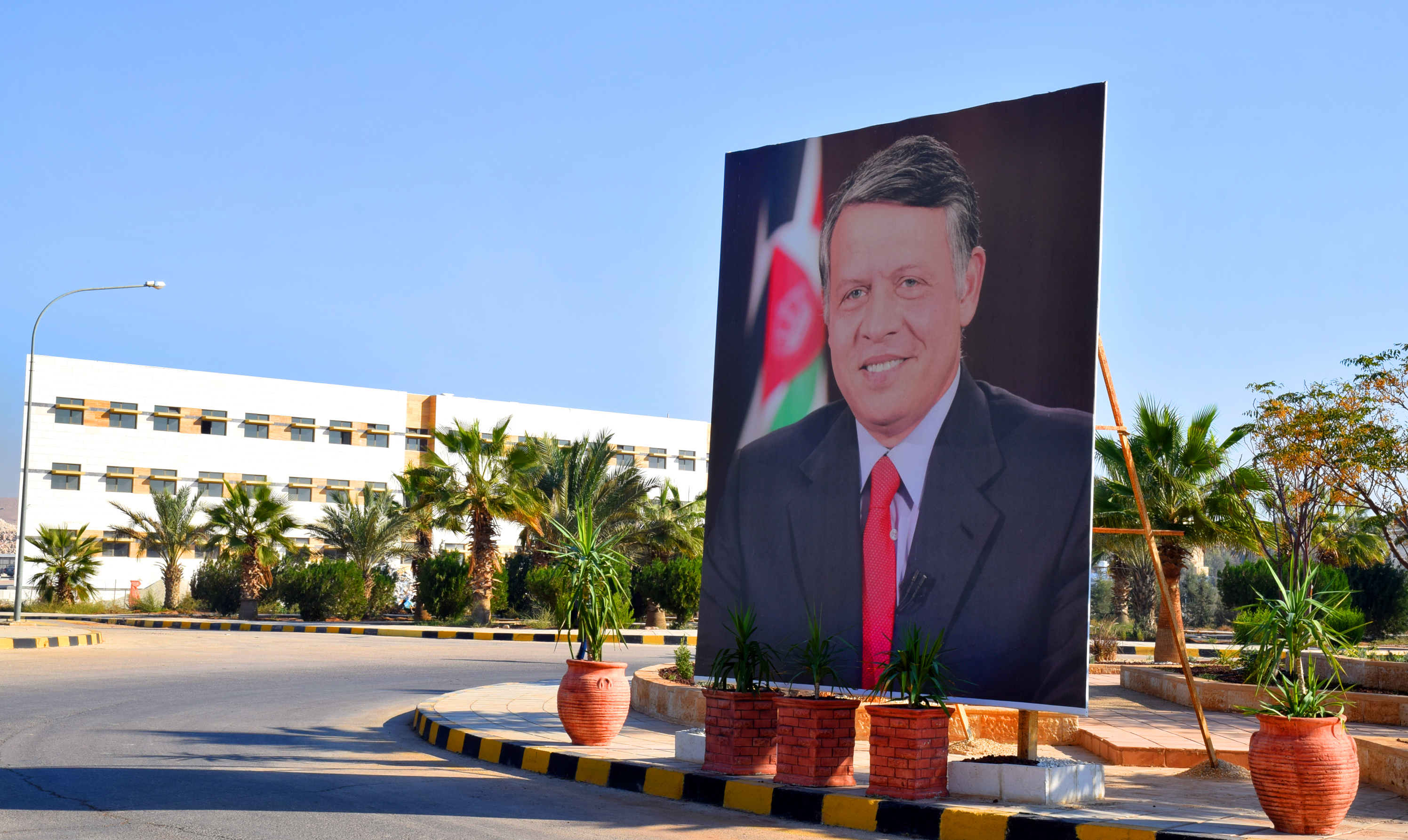
Traffic turn inside the University

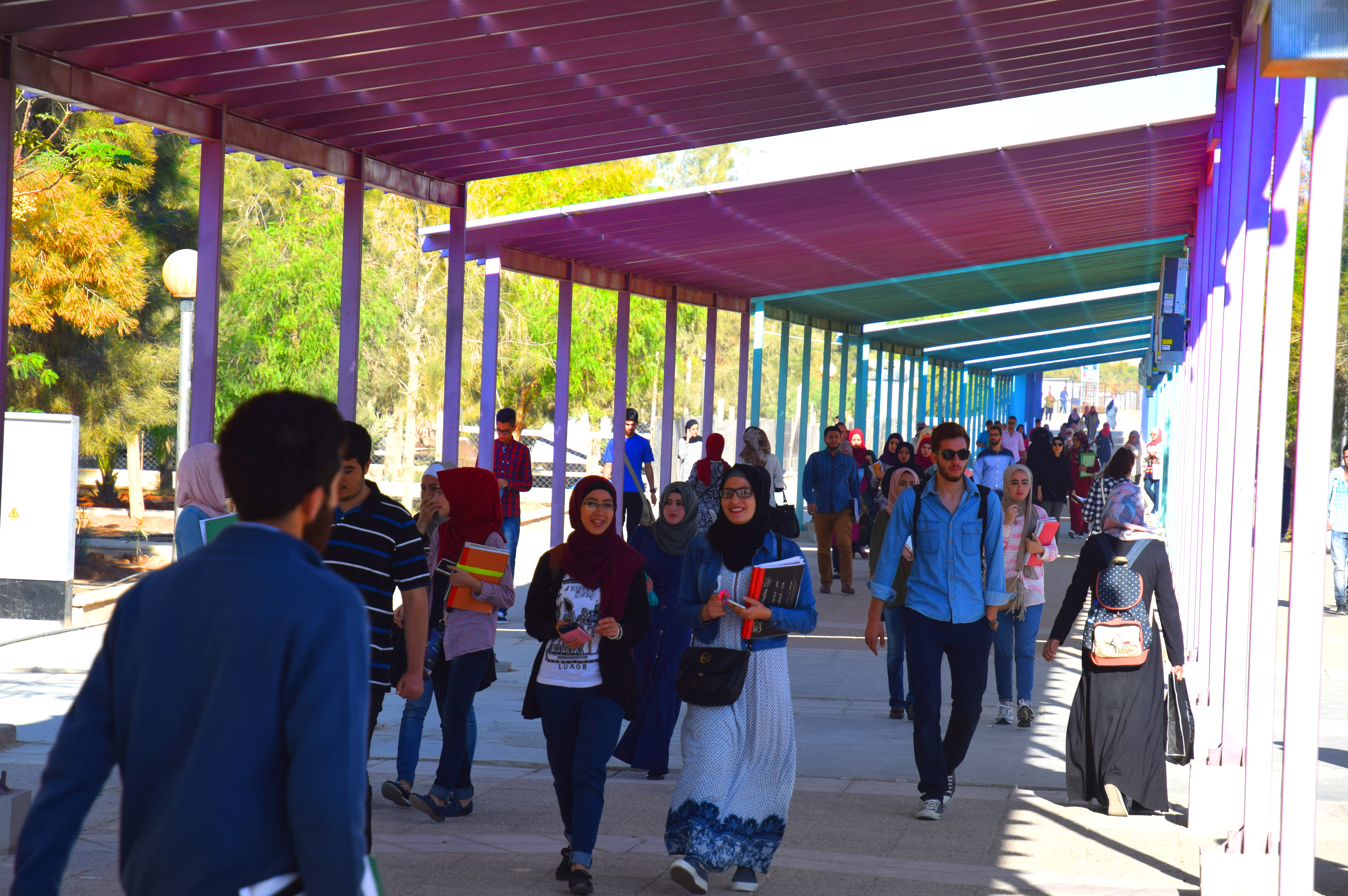
Students seek shelter from the sun under the solar energy plates.

Students seek shelter from rain under the solar energy plates.

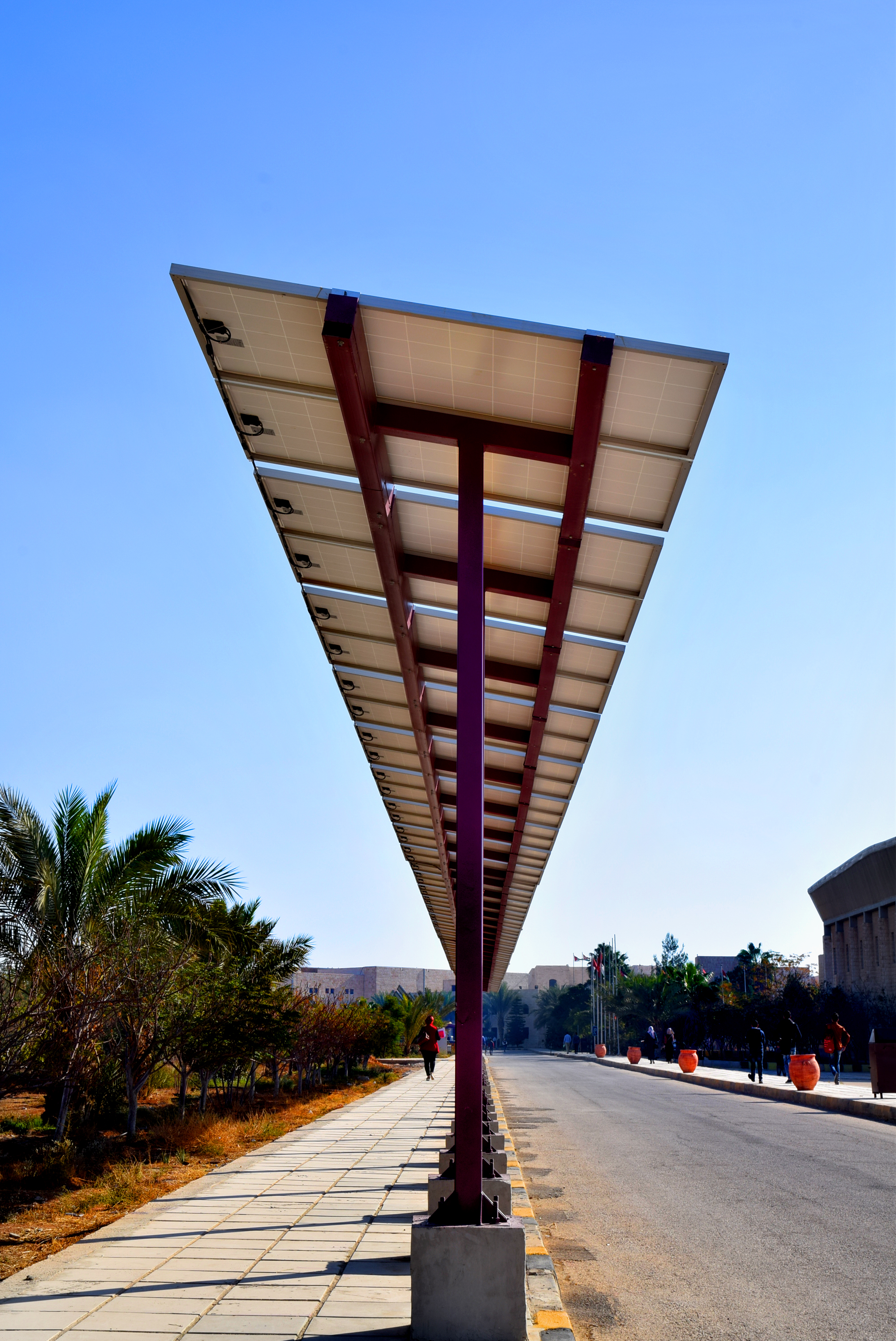
Solar energy plates directed toward sun

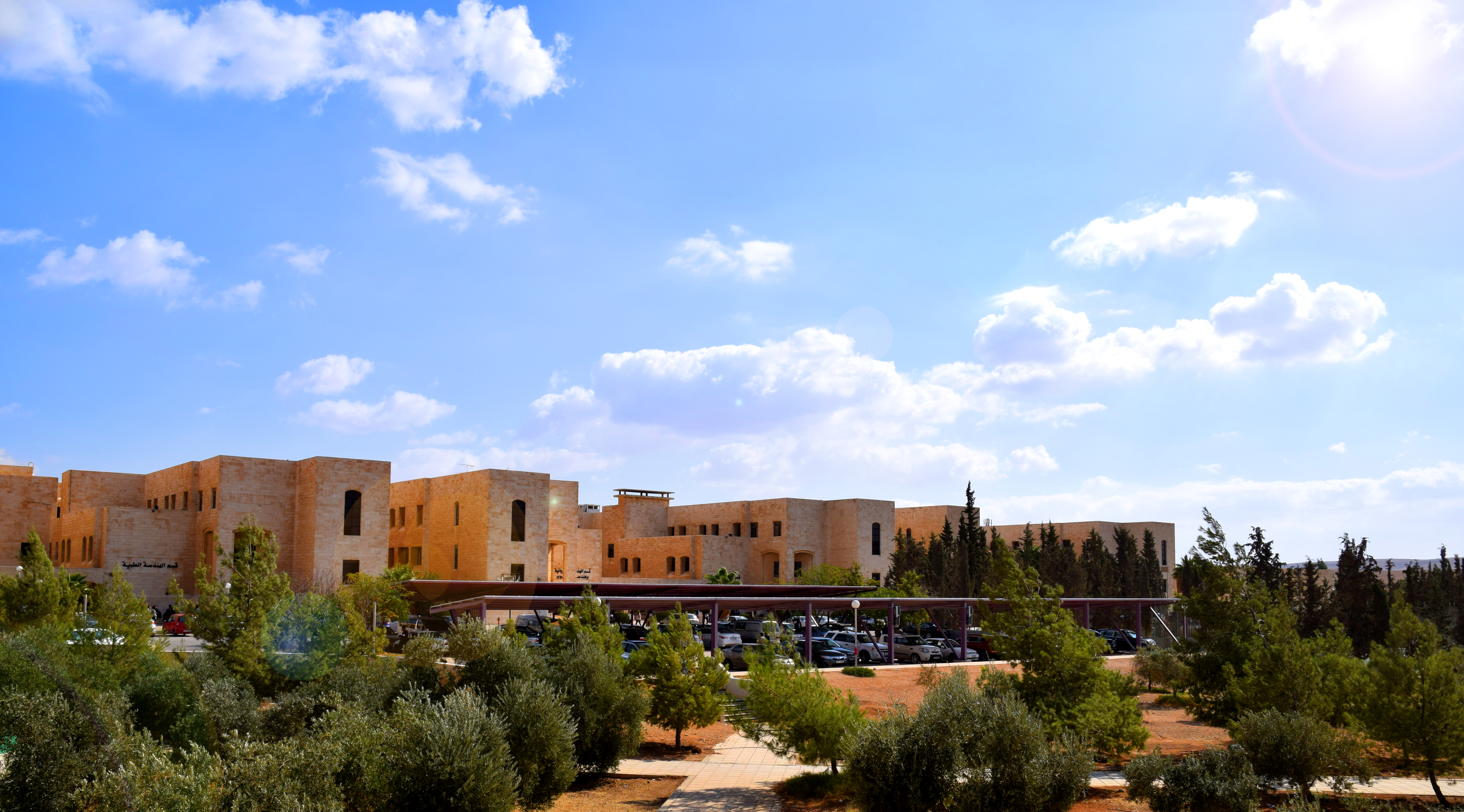
Faculty of Engineering

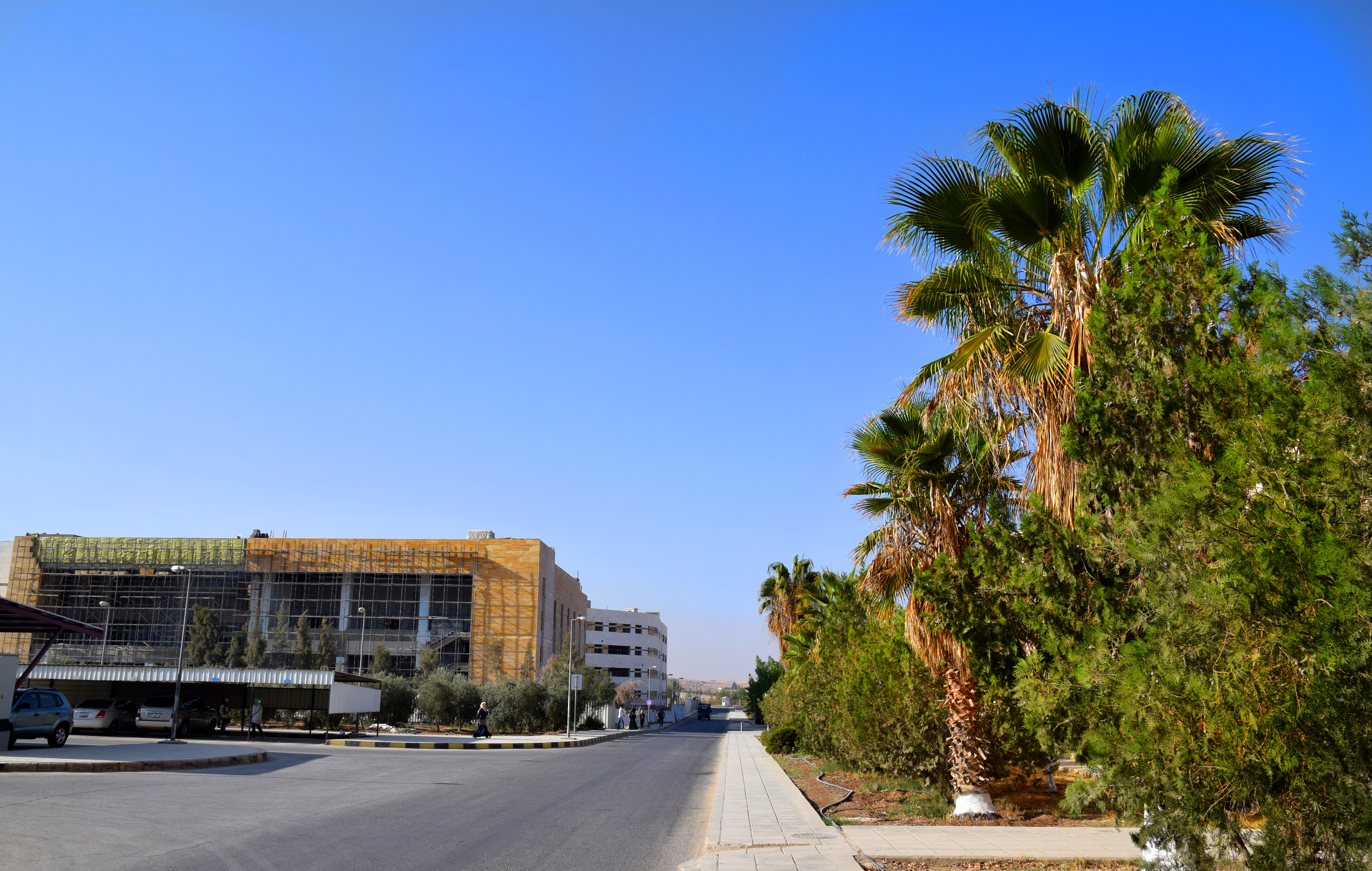
Southern classrooms building during its construction

Petra painting inside deanship of students affairs

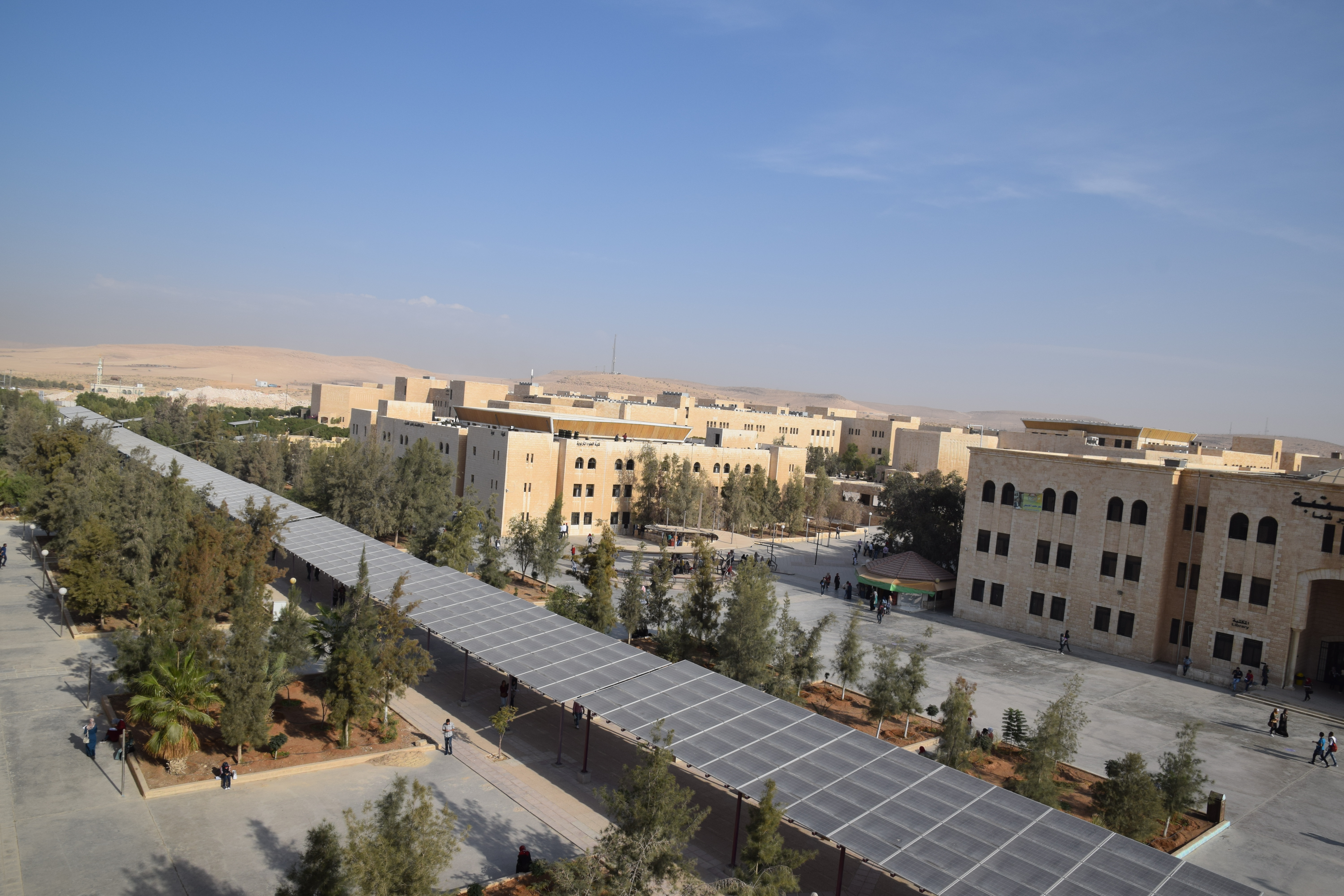
Picture from the air for University buildings and solar energy project
