= Firas Al Ali =

Syrian footballer (born 1985)

Personal information
- Date of birth: 1 August 1985 (age 41)
- Place of birth: Hama, Syria
- Height: 1.80 m (5 ft 11 in)
- Position: Wing-back

Team information
- Current team: Al-Arabi (Irbid)

Senior career*
Years	Team	Apps	(Gls)
2004–2011	Al-Taliya		
2011–2012	Al-Shorta		
2014–?	Al-Sheikh Hussein FC		
- * Club domestic league appearances and goals ‡ National team caps and goals as of 9 August 2013

Firas Al Ali (Arabic: فِرَاس الْعَلِيّ, born 1 August 1985 in Hama) is a Syrian footballer who played for Al-Sheikh Hussein FC in Jordan.

Firas al-Ali is a former defender for the Syrian national team. He also previously played for Shorta, one of the top teams in Damascus and earned $125,000 a season, a fortune in Syria. In 2011, Bashar al-Assad's forces attacked Hama, his hometown and killed Ali's 19-year-old cousin during a peaceful protest. They also killed his niece in her home during a bombing.

Months later, a 13-year-old cousin was killed during a government attack in a village outside Hama. The next morning, he left home and travelled through rebel-held territories, eventually arriving in Turkey at a refugee camp, where he still resides.
