= Jordan Journal of Mechanical and Industrial Engineering =

- Discipline: Engineering
- Language: English

Publication details
- History: 2007-present
- Publisher: Hashemite University Publishing (Jordan)
- Frequency: Biannual
- Open access: Yes

Standard abbreviations
- ISO 4: Jordan J. Mech. Ind. Eng.

Indexing
- ISSN: 1995-6665

Links
- Journal homepage

The Jordan Journal of Mechanical and Industrial Engineering is a peer-reviewed scientific journal that is published by the Hashemite University and Ministry of Higher Education and Scientific Research (Jordan). It was established in 2007 and covers the field of engineering, including computational fluid dynamics, thermodynamics, mechatronics, and renewable energy. The journal is abstracted and indexed in Scopus.
