= Omar Athamneh =

Jordanian football player

Personal information
- Full name: Omar Athamneh
- Date of birth: February 4, 1983 (age 43)
- Place of birth: Irbid, Jordan
- Position: Striker

Senior career*
Years	Team	Apps	(Gls)
2000–2011	Al-Hussein		
2011–2012	Al-Ramtha		
2012–2013	Al-Sareeh		
2013	Salalah		
2013–2014	Al-Hussein		
2014–2015	Al-Sareeh		
2015–2016	Kufrsoum		
2016–2017	Al-Arabi		
- * Club domestic league appearances and goals

Omar Athamneh is a retired Jordanian footballer.
