= Ahmed Hatamleh =

Jordanian footballer

Ahmed Ghazi
Personal information
- Full name: Ahmed Ghazi Abdel-Hafeeth Hatamleh
- Date of birth: 10 July 1982 (age 44)
- Place of birth: Irbid, Jordan
- Height: 1.78 m (5 ft 10 in)
- Position: Midfielder

Youth career
- Al-Hussein

Senior career*
Years	Team	Apps	(Gls)
1999–2008	Al-Hussein		
2008	Al-Baqa'a		
2008–2009	Al-Yarmouk		
2009–2013	Al-Arabi		
2013–2014	Al-Ramtha		
2014	Al-Shabab		
2014–2015	Al-Ramtha		
2015	Al-Nahda		
2015–2017	Al-Hussein		

International career
2002–2006	Jordan	5	(0)
- * Club domestic league appearances and goals

Ahmed Ghazi Abdel-Hafeeth Hatamleh commonly known as Ahmed Ghazi (Arabic: أحمد غازي عبد الحفيظ حتاملة) is a retired Jordanian footballer.

Hatamleh officially announced his retirement from playing football on 27 May 2022.
