= Yasser Al-Rawashdeh =

Jordanian footballer

Personal information
- Date of birth: April 21, 1990 (age 36)
- Place of birth: Irbid, Jordan
- Height: 1.81 m (5 ft 11 in)
- Position: Right back

Team information
- Current team: Al-Jazeera
- Number: 25

Youth career
- 2004–2006: Al-Arabi

Senior career*
Years	Team	Apps	(Gls)
2006–2014	Al-Arabi		
2014–2018	Al-Faisaly		
2018–2020	Al-Salt		
2020–2021	Ma'an		
2021	Al-Najma		
2021–2022	Al-Hussein		
2022–2024	Shabab Al-Aqaba		
2024–2025	Al-Sareeh	17	(1)
2025–	Al-Jazeera	9	(1)

International career^{‡}
2007–2008	Jordan U19		
2010–2011	Jordan U23		(1)
2016–2017	Jordan	15	(0)
- * Club domestic league appearances and goals as of 30 January 2026 ‡ National team caps and goals as of 9 December 2017

Yasser Al-Rawashdeh (Arabic: ياسر الرواشدة) is a Jordanian footballer who plays for the Jordanian club Al-Jazeera.

== International goals ==
=== With U-23 ===
#	Date	Venue	Opponent	Score	Result	Competition
1	December 24, 2010	Zarqa	Kuwait	3–0	Win	U-23 Friendly

== Honours ==
- Jordan Premier League: 2016–17
- Jordan FA Cup: 2014–15, 2016–17
- Jordan Super Cup: 2015, 2017
