= Kamal Bani Hani =

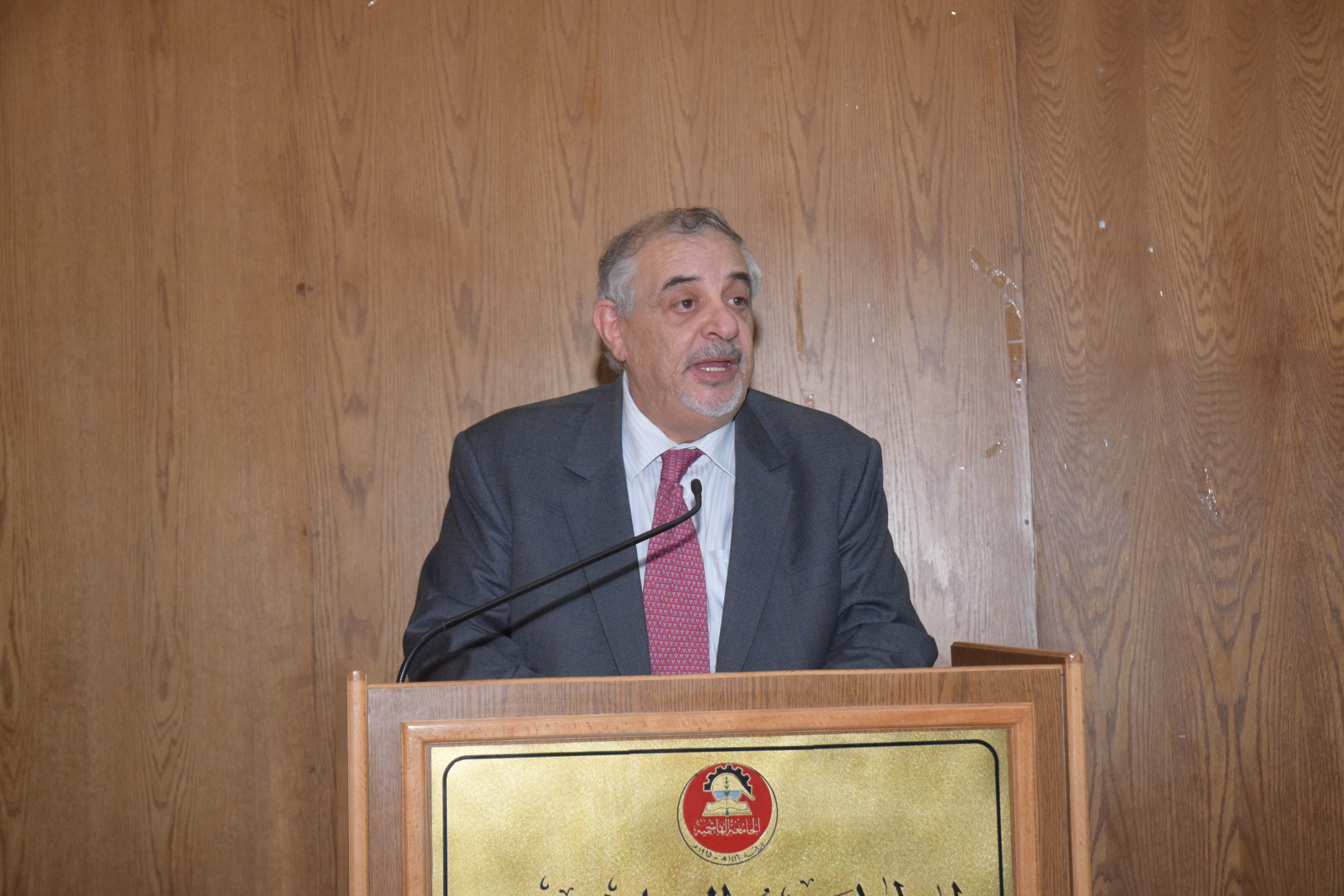

9th
- In office 2011–2019
- Preceded by: Rowaida Al-Maaitah
- Succeeded by: Fawwaz M. Al-Abed Al-Haq

Personal details
- Born: Irbid, Jordan
- Occupation: Former president of Hashemite University
- Awards: Scopus from Elsevier; Marquis Who's Who
- Website: HU staff page

Kamal Eddin Hussein Ali Bani Hani is a Jordanian gastrointestinal surgeon and the former president of Hashemite University.

== Early life and education ==
Kamal Eddin Hussein Ali Bani Hani was born in Irbid, Jordan.

Hani graduated from College of Medicine University of Baghdad in Iraq in 1984. In 1992 he graduated from Royal College of Physicians & Surgeons of Glasgow in the United Kingdom, and in 2002 he was awarded a doctoral degree from Leeds University.

== Career ==
Hani is a gastrointestinal surgeon.

He also was the dean of faculty of medicine at Jordan University of Science and Technology from September 2008 to October 2010. He was dean of the faculty of medicine at Hashemite University, and later president of that university, assisted by Shaher Rababeh and Ali El Karmi as vice-presidents. He was succeeded by Fawwaz M. Al-Abed Al-Haq in 2019/2020.

== Awards ==
- Scopus from Elsevier award to honor his contribution to science in April 2009
- Marquis Who's Who at 2009 in medicine and healthcare
- 2018 Golisano Children's Hospital of Southwest Florida's Health Leadership Award]]
