= Mohammad Balas =

Jordanian footballer

Personal information
- Full name: Mohammad Najeh Balas
- Date of birth: January 22, 1982 (age 44)
- Place of birth: Irbid, Jordan
- Position: Defender

Senior career*
Years	Team	Apps	(Gls)
1999–2010	Al-Hussein		
2010–2011	Al-Arabi		
2011–2012	Manshia Bani Hassan		
2012	Al-Sareeh		
2012–2013	Al-Hussein		
2013	Al-Sheikh Hussein		
2013–2014	Malkiya		
- * Club domestic league appearances and goals

Mohammad Najeh Balas is a retired Jordanian footballer who played as a defender.
