= Ahmad Al-Sagheer =

Jordanian footballer

Personal information
- Full name: Ahmad Mahmoud Al-Sagheer
- Date of birth: February 22, 1992 (age 34)
- Place of birth: Irbid, Jordan
- Position: Goalkeeper

Team information
- Current team: Al-Hussein (Irbid)
- Number: 1

Youth career
- 2005–2010: Al-Hussein (Irbid)

Senior career*
Years	Team	Apps	(Gls)
2010–	Al-Hussein (Irbid)		

International career
2009–2010	Jordan U-19		
2012–	Jordan U-22		
- * Club domestic league appearances and goals

Ahmad Mahmoud Al-Sagheer is a Jordanian footballer who plays as a goalkeeper for Al-Hussein (Irbid).
