= Ammar Abu-Aleeqa =

Jordanian footballer

Ammar Abu Aleeqa
Personal information
- Full name: Ammar Ali Ibrahim Abu Aleeqa
- Date of birth: 13 March 1985 (age 41)
- Place of birth: Irbid, Jordan
- Height: 1.79 m (5 ft 10 in)
- Position: Defender

Senior career*
Years	Team	Apps	(Gls)
2004–2013	Al-Arabi		(10)
2008–2009	→ Al-Baqa'a (loan)		(1)
2013–2017	Al-Ramtha	42	(4)
2017	Al-Ahli	0	(0)
2017–2018	Al-Faisaly		(0)
2018–2019	Al-Hussein		(1)
2019–2020	Al-Sareeh		

International career
2006–2007	Jordan U23		
2008	Jordan	2	(0)
- * Club domestic league appearances and goals

Ammar Ali Ibrahim Abu Aleeqa (Arabic: عمار ابو عليقة; born 13 March 1985) is a retired Jordanian footballer.
