= Al-Arabi SC (Irbid) =

Jordanian sports club based in Irbid

Al-Arabi
- Full name: Al-Arabi Sport Club
- Nicknames: صقور الشمال ('Northern Falcons')
- Founded: 1945; 81 years ago
- Ground: Al-Hassan Stadium
- Capacity: 15,000
- Chairman: Dr. Yousef Fouad Al-Khasawneh Honorary President: Karim Yazid Al-Mufti Executive Director: Counselor Khaled Abu Zaid
- Manager: Imad Rashad
- League: Jordanian Pro League
- 2025: Jordanian First Division League, 1st of 14 (promoted)
- Website: Official page
Home colours	Away colours

Al-Arabi Sport Club (Arabic: نادي العربي الرياضي), also known as Al-Arabi Irbid (Arabic: نادي العربي إِربِد), is a football club based in Irbid, Jordan. It will compete in the Jordanian Pro League, the top tier of Jordanian football.

== History ==
Al-Arabi Sport Club began when a group of 22 young intellectuals were interested in establishing a place, where they could gather and practice their various hobbies. Thus, the Acting and Music Club was formed in 1945. The club began as one that focused on youth culture and music, and sports was not a focus of the club at the time. It established its sports branch in 1955, under the current name Al-Arabi Sport Club. Al-Arabi is considered to be one of the oldest football clubs formed in Jordan, and the oldest club in Northern Jordan.

According to Fayez Salim, the football team rose to the ranks of the Premier League team and was the first team from Irbid to win the Jordan FA Cup in 1986 and is still the only team from the city of Irbid to have won it as of 2025.

Al-Arabi was also famous for its handball team, as it dominated the Kingdom’s championships for nearly 16 consecutive years, between 1983 and ending in 1991, as well as hosting other sports such as tennis, volleyball, cycling and athletics. A peculiarity within the club during the domination of its handball team was that some of their players switched between representing Al-Arabi in handball and Al-Arabi in football.

=== Recent history ===
Al-Arabi finished as runners-up of the 2009–10 Jordan FA Cup, where they narrowly lost 1-0 to Al-Wehdat at the King Abdullah II Stadium.

On 8 November 2017, Al-Arabi was threatened with collapse as it faced a difficult financial situation, owing a debt of over 1 million dinars.

On 1 July 2019, various properties of Al-Arabi were put up for sale that amounted to approximately $10.4 million.

On 17 December 2019, Al-Arabi and Al-Hussein began renovating a football stadium in the Zabada area of Irbid. It would be used as a training ground for both clubs, as opposed to go all the way to Ar-Ramtha to conduct their training.

On 10 December 2025, Al-Arabi returned to the Jordanian Pro League after a 12-year absence. It would go on to win the 2025 Jordanian First Division League.

On 24 May 2026, the club's board of directors announced the approval of Jordanian businessman Karim Yazid Al-Mufti to take over as honorary presidency of the club.

== Team identity ==
On 12 July 2026, Al-Arabi unveiled a new logo ahead of their return to the Jordanian Pro League.

The previous logo of Al-Arabi SC (Irbid)

The previous logo of Al-Arabi SC (Irbid)

=== Kit suppliers and shirt sponsors ===
Period	Kit supplier	Shirt sponsor
	(Germany) Adidas	
	(Germany) Uhlsport	
	(Germany) Jako	
	(Germany) Puma	
–2026	(Spain) Kelme	
2026–	(Jordan) Gymkuma	None

== Current squad ==
As of 17 September 2026

Note: Flags indicate national team as defined under FIFA eligibility rules; some limited exceptions apply. Players may hold more than one non-FIFA nationality.

No.	Pos.	Nation	Player
1	GK	JOR	Rafat Al-Rabee
2	DF	SEN	Nestor Ndamy
4	DF	JOR	Mohammad Bani Yaseen
5	DF	JOR	Ma'moun Altha'labi
6	MF	JOR	Rami Al-Mayouf
7	FW	JOR	Yousef Al-Rawashdeh (captain)
8	MF	JOR	Mohammad Al-Razem
9	FW	JOR	Baker Kalbouneh
10	FW	MTN	Oumar M'Bareck
11	FW	JOR	Hamza Bani Yaseen
12	DF	JOR	Ahmad Al-Shdefat
13	DF	JOR	Mohammad Al-Amaireh
14	DF	JOR	Zaid Abu Al-Rish
15	FW	PLE	Sameh Maraaba
16	MF	JOR	Ibrahim Al-Akhras
17	DF	SEN	Babacar Diatta
18	MF	SEN	Sékou Matar Sagna

No.	Pos.	Nation	Player
19	FW	JOR	Malik Al-Sarhan
20	FW	JOR	Mo'taz Obeidat
22	GK	JOR	Rasheed Rafeed
23	DF	JOR	Yazan Al-Gharabala
24	DF	JOR	Ali Hasan Al-Dyraniah
26		JOR	Zaid Abu Al-Haija
31	GK	JOR	Mohammed Bashar
66	MF	JOR	Adnan Bakkar
80	MF	JOR	Yanal Al-Mahmoud
88	FW	JOR	Ali Mashahra
99	GK	JOR	Mohammad Al-Hayek
—	DF	JOR	Issam Smeeri
—	GK	JOR	Laith Mahawerh
—	MF	JOR	Mo'men Abulibdeh
—	MF	JOR	Khader Al-Haj
—	FW	JOR	Abdulrahman Hawarna

== Personnel ==
=== Current staff ===
Position	Name
Head coach	(Jordan) Imad Rashad
Assistant coaches	(Jordan)
U-19 head coach	(Jordan)
U-13, U-15, U17 technical director	(Jordan)
Goalkeeping coach	(Jordan)
U-13 head coach and physical trainer	(Jordan)
U-17 head coach and U-15 assistant coach	(Jordan)
U-15 assistant coach	(Jordan)

=== Board of directors ===
Position	Name		
President	(Jordan) Dr. Youssef Fouad Al-Khasawneh		
Honorary president	(Jordan) Karim Yazid Al-Mufti		
Executive Director:	(Jordan) Counselor Khaled Abu Zaid	Secretary	(Jordan)

== Notable players ==
The following players have either played at the professional or international level, either before, during or after playing for Al-Arabi SC (Irbid):

- (Jordan) Mustafa Abu Musameh
- (Jordan) Ammar Abu-Aleeqa
- (Jordan) Saed Al-Rosan
- (Jordan) Hatem Aqel
- (Jordan) Omar Athamneh
- (Jordan) Mohammad Balas
- (Jordan) Anas Bani Yaseen
- (Jordan) Bashar Bani Yaseen
- (Jordan) Ihsan Haddad
- (Jordan) Ahmed Hatamleh
- (Jordan) Salah Massad
- (Jordan) Saeed Murjan
- (Jordan) Abdel-Ru'ouf Al-Rawabdeh
- (Jordan) Yasser Al-Rawashdeh
- (Jordan) Yousef Al-Rawashdeh
- (Jordan) Yousef Al-Thodan
- (Jordan) Mahmoud Za'tara
- (Jordan) Anas Al-Zboun
- (Jordan) Mohammad Zureiqat
- (Ivory Coast) Musa Ouattara
- (Iraq) Mohammad Hussein
- (Syria) Firas Al Ali
- (Syria) Ibrahim Al Hasan
- (Syria) Maher Al Sayed
- (Syria) Ahmad Deeb
- (Syria) Ahmed Idrees

== Managerial history ==
- (Jordan) Fares Shdifat (?–2009)
- (Iraq) Kadhim Khalaf (2009–2010)
- (Jordan) Osama Qasem (2010)
- (Jordan) Muneer Masbah (2010–2011)
- (Jordan) Mustafa Al-Lubani (2011–2012)
- (Syria) Hisham Khalf (2011)
- (Jordan) Issa Al-Turk (2012)
- (Syria) Maher Bahri (2012–2013)
- (Jordan) Ahmed Sobh (2013)
- (Iraq) Kadhim Khalaf (2013–2014)
- (Serbia) Bega (2014)
- (Jordan) Mohammad Al-Ababneh (2014)

== Honours ==
- Jordan FA Cup
  - Winners (1): 1986
