= Mohammad Jamal (footballer) =

Jordanian footballer (born 1976)

Personal information
- Full name: Mohammad Jamal Amin Jarar
- Date of birth: February 16, 1976 (age 50)
- Place of birth: Amman, Jordan
- Height: 1.81 m (5 ft 11 in)
- Position: Defensive midfielder

Senior career*
Years	Team	Apps	(Gls)
1995–2006	Al-Baqa'a SC		
2006–2007	Shabab Al-Ordon		
2007–2013	Al-Wahdat		

International career
2002–2010	Jordan	41	(0)
- * Club domestic league appearances and goals

Mohammad Jamal Amin Jarar is a Jordanian retired footballer. He became the director general of Al-Wahdat SC after he immediately retired from playing football.

== International career ==
Jamal retired internationally after his last match against Kuwait in the 2010 WAFF Championship, which resulted in a 2–2 draw.

== Honors and Participation in International Tournaments ==
=== In WAFF Championships ===
- 2002 WAFF Championship
- 2010 WAFF Championship
