= 2026–27 Jordanian Pro League =

Jordanian Pro League
- Season: 2026–27
- Dates: 3 September 2026 – 15 May 2027
- Country: Jordan
- Teams: 10
- Matches: 40
- Goals: 81 (2.03 per match)
- Top goalscorer: Ahmed Ersan (Al-Faisaly) (6 goals)
- All statistics correct as of 9 November 2026.

The 2026–27 Jordanian Pro League (Arabic: الدوري الأردني للمحترفين 2026–27), also known as the CFI Jordanian Pro League for sponsorship reasons, is the 74th season of Jordanian Pro League since its inception in 1944. The season started on 3 September 2026, and is set to conclude on 15 May 2027.

Al-Hussein are the defending champions of the 2025–26 season. Al-Arabi and Doqara will join as the promoted clubs from the 2025 Jordanian First Division League. They will replace Al-Sarhan and Al-Ahli, who were relegated to the 2026 Jordanian First Division League.

== Format ==
The 2026–27 season will mark the very first time a Jordanian Pro League club directly qualifies to the top-tier Asian Football Confederation competition, after the slot allocations for the 2027–28 AFC Champions League Elite were determined by the end of the 2025–26 season.

On 3 August 2026, the Jordan Football Association announced that the Pro League teams would be allowed to designate a Palestinian as a local player, provided they have played in six official matches for either the senior or Olympic national teams.

On 6 August 2026, the Jordan Professional Football League (JPFL) was launched as a self-governing administrative body formed by Jordan's top-tier football clubs to independently manage and commercialize the Jordanian Pro League away from direct JFA oversight.

This will be the first iteration of the league where VAR will be implemented.

== Teams ==
Ten teams will compete in the league. This includes the top eight teams from the previous season, as well as the two teams promoted from the 2025 Jordanian First Division League.

The first team to be promoted was Al-Arabi, returning to the top flight after an absence of twelve years. The second team to be promoted was Doqara, who are set to play in the top flight for the first time. They will replace Al-Sarhan and Al-Ahli, who got relegated to the First Division League after one and three years in the top flight, respectively.

=== Stadiums and locations ===
==== 2026–27 season ====
Jordanian Pro League 2026–27
Club	Location	Stadium	Capacity	Year formed
Al-Arabi	Irbid	Al-Hassan Stadium	12,000	1945
Al-Baqa'a	Ain Al-Basha, Balqa Governorate	Petra Stadium	6,000	1968
Al-Faisaly	Amman	Amman International Stadium	18,000	1932
Al-Hussein	Irbid	Al-Hassan Stadium	12,000	1964
Al-Jazeera	Amman	Amman International Stadium	18,000	1947
Al-Ramtha	Ar-Ramtha	Al-Hassan Stadium	12,000	1966
Al-Salt	As-Salt	Prince Hussein Bin Abdullah II Stadium	7,500	1965
Al-Wehdat	Amman	King Abdullah Stadium	14,000	1956
Doqara	Irbid	Al-Hassan Stadium	12,000	1990
Shabab Al-Ordon	Amman	King Abdullah Stadium	14,000	2002

==== Map ====
Location of clubs in Jordan for the 2026-27 Pro League season

=== Personnel and kits ===
Team	Manager	Captain	Kit manufacturer	Shirt sponsor
Al-Arabi	(Jordan) Diane Saleh	(Jordan) Yousef Al-Rawashdeh	Gymkuma	
Al-Baqa'a	(Jordan) Amjad Abu Tuaimeh	(Jordan) Mohammad Al-Kloub	Kelme	
Al-Faisaly	(Portugal) João Mota	(Jordan) Ahmed Ersan	Offside	Umniah
Al-Hussein	(Spain) Curro Torres	(Jordan) Mahmoud Al-Mardi	Kelme	
Al-Jazeera	(Jordan) Raed Al-Dawood	(Jordan) Yaseen Al-Bakhit	Kelme	7Boys
Al-Ramtha	(Croatia) Rodion Gačanin	(Jordan) Mussab Al-Laham	Kelme	Dinarak
Al-Salt	(Jordan) Raed Assaf	(Jordan) Husam Abu Sada	Kelme	Jordan Aviation
Al-Wehdat	(Egypt) Emad El-Nahhas	(Jordan) Feras Shelbaieh	Kelme	Umniah
Doqara	(Jordan) Anzor Nafash	(Jordan) Saeed Murjan (Jordan) Ward Al-Barri	Kelme	
Shabab Al-Ordon	(Tunisia) Walid Chettaoui	(Jordan) Amer Al-Majdoubah	Kelme	

=== Managerial changes ===
Team	Outgoing manager	Manner of departure	Date of vacancy	Incoming manager	Date of appointment
Al-Baqa'a	(Jordan) Raed Assaf		27 June 2026	(Jordan) Amjad Abu Tuaimeh	15 July 2026
Al-Salt	(Tunisia) Mohamed Ayari		27 June 2026	(Jordan) Raed Assaf	27 June 2026
Shabab Al-Ordon	(Jordan) Mahmoud Shelbaieh		1 July 2026	(Colombia) (Spain) Carlos Echeverry	22 July 2026
Al-Faisaly	(Jordan) Mo'ayyad Abu Keshek		3 July 2026	(Egypt) Tarek Mostafa	3 July 2026
Al-Wehdat	(Jordan) Jamal Mahmoud	Signed by Emirates	6 July 2026	(Jordan) Waseem Al-Bzour	16 July 2026
Doqara	(Jordan) Khaled Al-Daboubi		8 July 2026	(Jordan) Ahmed Abdel-Qader	8 July 2026
Al-Ramtha	(Serbia) Zoran Milinković			(Croatia) Rodion Gačanin	6 August 2026
Al-Jazeera	(Jordan) Ra'fat Ali			(Jordan) Raed Al-Dawood	
Al-Hussein	(Jordan) Ahmad Hayel	Sacked	13 September 2026	(Spain) Curro Torres	28 September 2026
Al-Wehdat	(Jordan) Waseem Al-Bzour	Sacked	19 September 2026	(Egypt) Emad El-Nahhas	24 September 2026
Shabab Al-Ordon	(Colombia) (Spain) Carlos Echeverry	Sacked	16 October 2026	(Tunisia) Walid Chettaoui	21 October 2026
Doqara	(Jordan) Ahmed Abdel-Qader	Resigned	23 October 2026	(Jordan) Anzor Nafash	30 October 2026
Al-Arabi	(Jordan) Imad Rashad	Resigned	25 October 2026	(Jordan) Diane Saleh	26 October 2026
Al-Faisaly	(Egypt) Tarek Mostafa	Sacked	5 November 2026	(Portugal) João Mota	5 November 2026

=== Foreign players ===
As of 20 September 2026

Club	Player 1	Player 2	Player 3	Player 4	Palestinian player	Former players
Al-Arabi	(Senegal) Sékou Matar Sagna	(Senegal) Nestor Ndamy	(Senegal) Babacar Diatta	(Mauritania) Oumar M'Bareck	(Palestine) Sameh Maraaba	
Al-Baqa'a	(Ghana) Augustine Ameworlorna	(Brazil) Caio Henrique Rocha	(Palestine) Al-Mahdi Issa		(Palestine) Oday Kharoub	
Al-Faisaly	(Ivory Coast) Jean Charles Ahoua	(Oman) Salaah Al-Yahyaei	(Burkina Faso) Saïdou Simporé	(Brazil) Cláudio Maradona	(Palestine) Camilo Saldaña	(Ivory Coast) Wilfried Eza
Al-Hussein	(Colombia) Brayan Riascos	(Brazil) Pedro Henrique	(Kenya) Masoud Juma	(Netherlands) Mohamed Rayhi	(Palestine) Qusai Al-Battat	(Nigeria) Paul Komolafe
Al-Jazeera	(Algeria) Abdeldjalil Mancer	(Palestine) Rashid Shawahna	(Palestine) Abdullah Shabana	(Mauritania) Bakary N'Diaye		
Al-Ramtha	(Nigeria) Azeez Oseni	(The Gambia) Alfusainey Gassama	(Ivory Coast) Serge Badjo	(Croatia) Amir Kahrimanović	(Palestine) Mohammed Khalil	(Tunisia) Nassim Hnid (Nigeria) Kingsley Eduwo
Al-Salt	(England) Oludare Olufunwa	(Nigeria) Kalu Onyemaechi	(Nigeria) Sulaimon Babatunde	(Nigeria) Ebedebiri Endurance		
Al-Wehdat	(Senegal) Baffa Diop	(Morocco) Faouzi Abdoul Mutalib	(Senegal) Bouly Sambou	(Botswana) Thatayaone Ditlhokwe	(Palestine) Mahmoud Abu Warda	
Doqara	(Brazil) Mateus Amaral	(Mauritania) Mahmoud El Hacen	(Senegal) Muhammed Diame Pape	(Brazil) Breno Teixeira	(Palestine) Ahmed Qatmish	
Shabab Al-Ordon	(Dominican Republic) Jordy Durán	(Ecuador) Saúl Castro	(Ecuador) Maikel Caicedo	(Tunisia) Iyed Belgacem	(Palestine) Ali Rabaei	

== League table ==
Pos	Team	Pld	W	D	L	GF	GA	GD	Pts	Qualification or relegation
1	Al-Faisaly	8	4	3	1	13	4	+9	15	Qualification for 2027–28 AFC Champions League Elite group stage (Note: The 2026–27 Jordan FA Cup champions will qualify for the 2027–28 AFC Champions League Two group stage.)
2	Al-Ramtha	8	4	3	1	7	6	+1	15	Qualification for the Arab Club Champions Cup group stage
3	Al-Wehdat	8	4	2	2	4	2	+2	14	
4	Al-Hussein	8	3	3	2	11	12	−1	12	
5	Al-Baqa'a	8	3	2	3	7	7	0	11	
6	Al-Jazeera	8	2	4	2	14	7	+7	10	
7	Al-Salt	8	1	5	2	6	7	−1	8	
8	Al-Arabi	8	2	2	4	6	12	−6	8	
9	Shabab Al-Ordon	8	1	4	3	7	11	−4	7	Relegation to Jordanian First Division League
10	Doqara	8	1	2	5	6	13	−7	5	Relegation to Jordanian First Division League

Rules for classification: 1) Points; 2) Head-to-head points; 3) Head-to-head goal difference; 4) Head-to-head goals scored; 5) Goal difference; 6) Goals scored;

== Results ==
=== Matches 1–18 ===
Teams played each other twice, once at home, once away.

Home \ Away	ARA	BAQ	ALF	ALH	ALJ	ALR	ASA	ALW	DOQ	SHA
Al-Arabi		0–2			0–0		1–3			1–0
Al-Baqa'a			0–4				0–0	0–1	1–0	
Al-Faisaly				0–1		4–1			2–0	0–0
Al-Hussein	4–1	0–0			0–5		2–2		1–0	
Al-Jazeera			2–2			0–1		0–1		1–1
Al-Ramtha	1–0	2–1							0–0	
Al-Salt			0–1		1–1	0–0		0–0		
Al-Wehdat	0–1		0–0	1–0		0–1				
Doqara	2–2				1–5		2–0			1–2
Shabab Al-Ordon		0–3		3–3		1–1		0–1		

Legend: Blue = home team win; Yellow = draw; Red = away team win.

== Statistics ==
=== Top goalscorers ===
As of 24 October 2026

Rank	Player	Team	Goals
1	(Jordan) Ahmad Ersan	Al-Faisaly	6
2	(Jordan) Yaseen Al-Bakhit	Al-Jazeera	4
3	(Jordan) Ahmad Al-Harahsha	Al-Jazeera	3
3	(Ecuador) Saúl Castro	Shabab Al-Ordon	3
3	(Jordan) Abed Jarwan	Al-Baqa'a	3
3	(Jordan) Yahia Bakhet	Al-Jazeera	3

==== Hat-tricks ====
As of 17 October 2026

Player	For	Against	Result	Date
(Jordan) Ahmad Al-Harahsha	Al-Jazeera	Al-Hussein	5–0	5 September 2026
(Jordan) Yaseen Al-Bakhit	Al-Jazeera	Doqara	5–1	16 October 2026

=== Assists ===
As of 24 October 2026

Rank	Player	Team	Assists
1	(Jordan) Karam Abu Shaban	Al-Jazeera	3
1	(Jordan) Faisal Abu Shanab	Al-Salt	3
3	(Jordan) Anas Al-Awadat	Al-Faisaly	2
3	(Jordan) Ali Hajabi	Al-Hussein	2
3	(Ivory Coast) Jean Charles Ahoua	Al-Faisaly	2
3	(Jordan) Yaseen Al-Bakhit	Al-Jazeera	2
3	(Palestine) Rashid Shawahna	Al-Jazeera	2
3	(Brazil) Cláudio Maradona	Al-Faisaly	2

=== Clean-sheets ===
As of 17 October 2026

Rank	Player	Club	Clean sheets
1	(Jordan) Malek Shalabiya	Al-Ramtha	4
2	(Jordan) Abdallah Al-Fakhouri	Al-Faisaly	3
2	(Jordan) Murad Al-Faluji	Al-Ramtha	3
