= Cleft palate incidence by population =

Cleft lip and/or palate is a congenital abnormality that is seen frequently around the world. On average, about 1 in every 500-750 live births result in a cleft (Hardin-Jones, Karnell, & Peterson-Falzone, 2001). Furthermore, in the U.S., the prevalence for cleft lip with or without cleft palate (CL +/- P) is 2.2 to 11.7 per 10,000 births. Cleft palate alone (CP) results in a prevalence rate of 5.5 to 6.6 per 10,000 births (Forrester & Merz, 2004). Cleft of the lip, palate, or both is one of the most common congenital abnormalities and has a birth prevalence rate ranging from 1/1000 to 2.69/1000 amongst different parts of the world (McLeod, Saeed, & Arana- Urioste, 2004).

== Africans and African Americans ==
A look into the prevalence rates of different cultures in the U.S. when compared to country of origin begins with Africans and African Americans. One per 2500 African Americans are born with a cleft (Suleiman, Hamzah, Abusalab, & Samaan, 2005). African Americans have a lower prevalence rate of CL +/- P when compared to Caucasians. A prevalence rate of 0.61 per 1,000 and 1.05 per 1,000 live births respectively was reported by Croen, Shaw, Wasserman and Tolarova (1998). In Malawi there is a reported low prevalence rate for cleft lip and/or palate, 0.7 per 1,000 live births (Chisi, Igbibi, & Msamati, 2000). Suleiman et al. (2005) found that the prevalence rate of clefting among a group of Sudanese hospital new-borns in the city of Khartoum is 0.9 per 1,000 live births.

== Mestizo Americans ==
Mestizo Americans are people of mixed European and Native American origins from Mexico, Central America and South America, and the Caribbean (Meyerson, 1990). The prevalence of Mestizo Americans is lower than that of Caucasians and Native Americans, yet it is still higher than African Americans (Croen et al., 1998). Mestizo have a prevalence of clefting of 9.7 per 10,000 live births (Kirby, Petrini & Alter, 2000). In Sucre, Bolivia the prevalence rate of CL +/- P is 1.23 per 1,000 live births (McLeod et al., 2004).

== Jordan ==
Al Omari & Al-Omari (2004) reported that no study exists that has specifically looked at clefting among Jordanians prior to their investigation. Al Omari et al. (2004) examined the prevalence of clefting over an eleven-year period in Jordan and found an overall rate of 1.39 per 1,000 live births for CL +/- P. This was found to be similar with the prior studies that have examined clefting in other Arab populations. A further study by Aqrabawi HE (2008) stated that the total number of liveborn infants was 25 440, 60 of whom (2.4/1000) had facial clefts: 20 (33%) with cleft lip, 15 (25%) with cleft palate and 25 (42%) with both

== United States ==
Hawaii is a U.S. state which has an extremely diverse population consisting of 73% people of Asian and Pacific Islander descent. Forrester & Merz (2004) found that the prevalence rates of CL +/- P per 10,000 live births in Hawaii were: 10 in Caucasians, 16 in people of Far East Asian descent, 11 in people of Pacific Islander descent, and 14.5 in people of Filipino descent.

When looking at the countries of origin, a higher rate was seen for Asians, specifically in Pakistan, with the prevalence rate being 1.91 per 1,000 live births (Elahi, Jackson, Elahi, Khan, Mubarak, Tariq, & Mitra, 2004). Similarly, C. Oh, S. Kim, W. Kim, & J. Kim (2002) found a similar prevalence rate of 1.81 per 1,000 births in the Republic of Korea. Valid prevalence rates in the native countries of the Philippines and Pacific Islands could not be reported.
