= Zaid Jaber =

Jordanian footballer

Personal information
- Date of birth: January 6, 1991 (age 35)
- Height: 1.85 m (6 ft 1 in)
- Position: Defender

Team information
- Current team: Dougra

Youth career
- 2006–2007: Al-Jazeera
- 2007–2009: Shabab Al-Ordon

Senior career*
Years	Team	Apps	(Gls)
2009–2011	Shabab Al-Ordon		
2011–2012	Al-Suwaiq		
2012–2013	Al-Yarmouk		
2014	East Riffa		
2014–2017	Al-Ahli		
2016	→ Muaither (loan)		
2017–2020	Al-Jazeera		
2020–2021	Al-Hussein		
2021–2022	Al-Ahli		
2022	Al-Salt		
2022–2023	Al-Wehdat		
2023–2024	Al-Salt		
2024–	Dougra		

International career^{‡}
2007–2010	Jordan U-19		(1)
2010–2011	Jordan U-23		
- * Club domestic league appearances and goals as of 1 January 2025 ‡ National team caps and goals as of 23 March 2017

Zaid Jaber (Arabic: زيد جابر) (born January 6, 1991) is a Jordanian footballer who plays as a defender for the Jordanian club Dougra.

== International goals ==
=== With U-19 ===
#	Date	Venue	Opponent	Score	Result	Competition
1	September 13, 2010	Cairo	Egypt	1:1 (0:0) 4:1 PSO	Loss	U-19 Friendly
