= Dinarak =

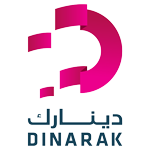
- Company type: Private
- Headquarters: Amman, Jordan
- Key people: Imad Aloyoun (CEO) Khaldoun Mahmoud (Co-founder) Loay Sehwail (Co-founder) Bassem Farraj (Chairman of the Board)
- Services: Mobile payment - Payment system
- Website: dinarak.com
- Launched: 2014
- Current status: Online

Dinarak (Al-Mutakamilah for Payments Services via Mobile Phone) is a mobile wallet, money transfer, electronic bill payment, funds disbursement service, licensed by the Central Bank of Jordan under the JoMoPay national switch and launched in late 2015 as Dinarak wallet as part of the Jordanian central bank's efforts to advocate financial inclusion for the un-banked segment of the Jordanian population. Dinarak allows users to deposit, withdraw, transfer money and pay for goods and services via their mobile phone. The service can be accessed by Dinarak mobile application.

JoMoPay, the Jordanian national mobile payments switch, is a unique payment system that has created cross-platform and platform level interoperability for multiple digital payments instruments in Jordan. This includes interoperability between the licensed mobile payment services providers as well as interoperability between mobile wallets, bank accounts, and prepaid cards.

== Services ==
Dinarak customers can deposit as well as withdraw money from a network of agents that includes many retail outlets, the post office and Exchange houses acting as banking agents. Dinarak offers mobile money solutions including:

- Salary/Funds disbursement
- Peer-peer money transfer
  - Mobile-to-mobile
  - Mobile-to-prepaid card
  - Mobile-to-bank account (and vice versa)
- Bill/Merchant payment
- National money transfer
- Mobile recharge plus Efawateercom access which is the national bill payment and presentment portal
- E-Commerce payment
- Cash-in/Cash-out services across Jordan
  - Dinarak branches
  - Exchange houses
  - Post office branches
  - Automated teller machines
  - Dinarak agents
- Cardless automated teller machine withdrawals via one-time password
- Cardless purchases via one-time password at any of the partner point of sale machines at merchants across the country.
- PrePaid MC Card refills from Dinarak mobile application
- Manual merchant payment via Merchant Alias
- Manual merchant payment via scanning of QC code
- NFC payment availability for low ticket items via near-field communication passive sticker

Registering for your Dinarak account requires visit a Dinarak Agent or Dinarak Branch with your national identification, filling in a form and activating your Dinarak App.

Non-Jordanians can use their passport (or United Nations High Commissioner for Refugees card) for registration and Know Your Customer requirements set forth by Central Bank of Jordan.

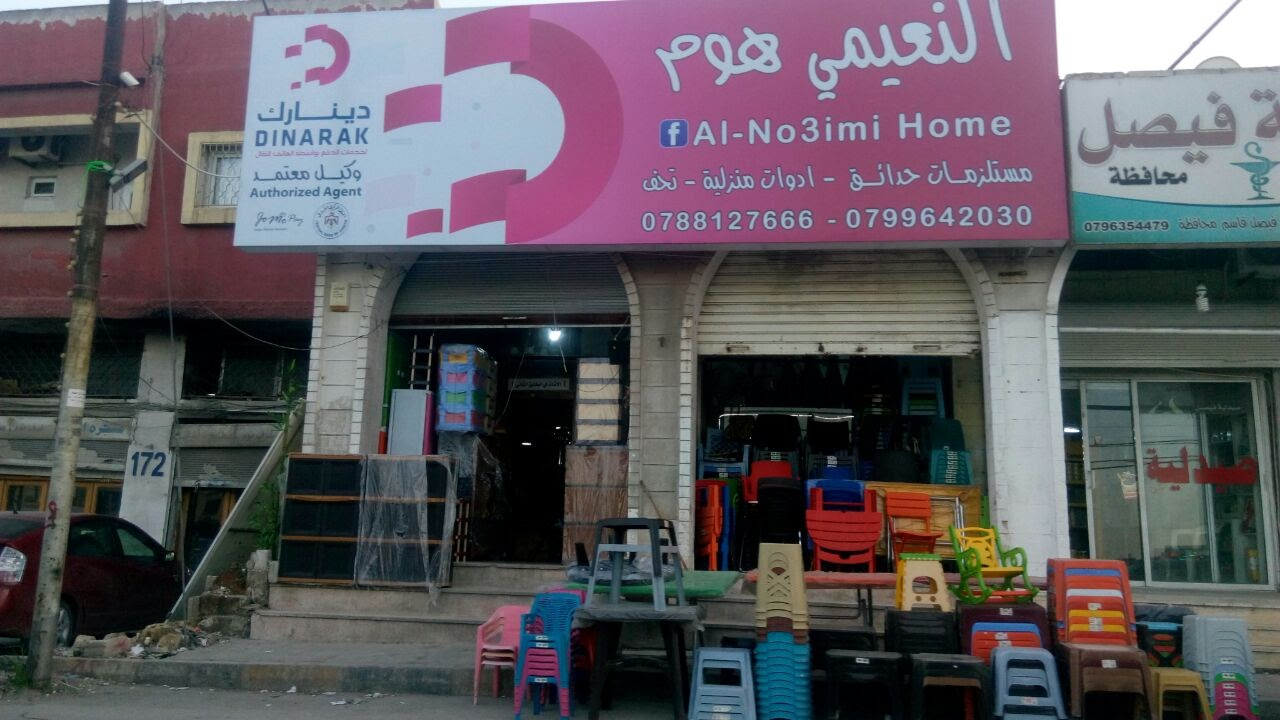
Dinarak agent

== Transaction charges and costs ==
Withdraw Cash at an agent	Making a Deposit	ATM Withdrawal	Sending Money(p2p)
1.00 JD to 5.00 JD: Fee = 0.50 JD	free	1 JD	1.00 JD to 5.00 JD: Fee = 0.10 JD
5.01 JD to 20.00 JD: Fee = 0.75 JD	free	1 JD	5.01 JD to 20.00 JD: Fee = 0.15 JD
>20.00 JD: Fee = 1.00 JD	free	1 JD	>20.00 JD: Fee = 0.25 JD

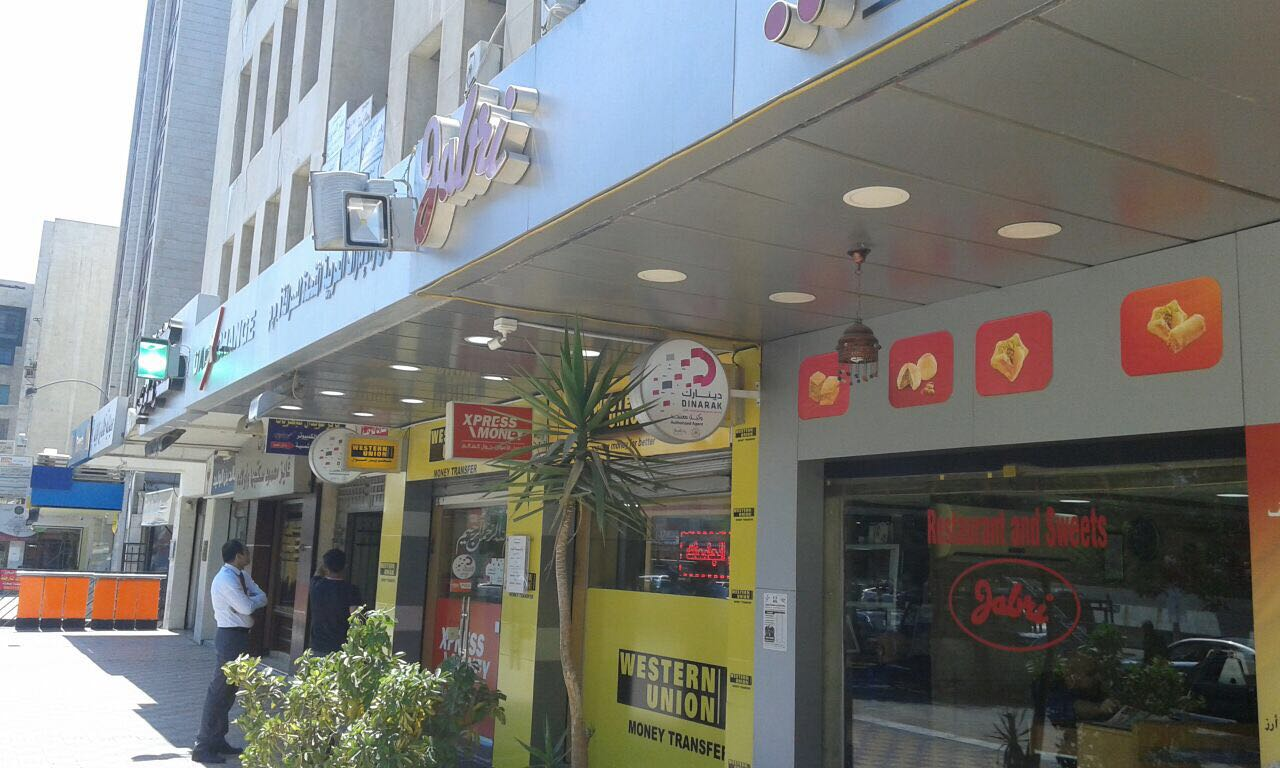
Exchange house as an agent

- No fees when using Dinarak MasterCard at Jordan Kuwait Bank ATMs
- No fees for receiving money
- Paying for goods and services
- Cardless automated teller machine withdrawals at Cairo Amman Bank
- No fees for making payments to retailers and merchants
- Bill payments / eFAWATEERCOM: free (no fees are added by Dinarak)
- Free account opening
- No minimum balance
- No monthly fees

== See also ==
- Digital currency
