= Fahad Al-Rashidi (footballer, born 1984) =

Kuwaiti footballer

Fahad Al Rashidi
Personal information
- Full name: Fahad Mohammad Aaidh Al-Rashidi
- Date of birth: 31 December 1984 (age 41)
- Place of birth: Kuwait City, Kuwait
- Height: 1.88 m (6 ft 2 in)
- Position: Striker

Team information
- Current team: Al Tadamon
- Number: 9

Youth career
- 1995–2003: Al Tadamon

Senior career*
Years	Team	Apps	(Gls)
2003–2011	Al Tadamon	178	(36)
2007–2008	→ Al Hazm (loan)	16	(7)
2008–2009	→ Al Salmiya (loan)	19	(6)
2009–2010	→ Al-Karamah (loan)	5	(1)
2011	Al-Oruba SC	9	(2)
2011–2019	Al Arabi	182	(51)
2016–2018	→ Al Salmiya (loan)	52	(21)
2019–2022	Al Salmiya	9	(3)
2021	→ Al Naser (loan)	1	(0)
2022–2023	Al-Fahaheel	5	(0)
2023–2024	Al Yarmouk	3	(0)
2024–	Al Tadamon	10	(2)

International career^{‡}
2006–	Kuwait	42	(10)
- * Club domestic league appearances and goals ‡ National team caps and goals as of 25 February 2017

Fahad Al-Rashidi (Arabic: فهد محمد عايض الرشيدي; born 31 December 1984) is a Kuwaiti football player. He currently plays for Kuwaiti Premier League side Al-Fahaheel.

== International career ==
=== International goals ===
Scores and results list Kuwait's goal tally first.

No	Date	Venue	Opponent	Score	Result	Competition
1.	9 November 2006	Al Kuwait Sports Club Stadium, Kaifan, Kuwait	Chinese Taipei	7–0	10–0	Friendly
2.	9 November 2006	Al Kuwait Sports Club Stadium, Kaifan, Kuwait	Chinese Taipei	10–0	10–0	Friendly
3.	20 January 2007	Zayed Sports City Stadium, Abu Dhabi, United Arab Emirates	Oman	1–1	1–2	18th Arabian Gulf Cup
4.	26 March 2008	Al Kuwait Sports Club Stadium, Kaifan, Kuwait	Iran	2–2	2–2	2010 FIFA World Cup qualification
5.	22 December 2011	Thani bin Jassim Stadium, Doha, Qatar	Palestine	2–0	3–0	2011 Pan Arab Games
6.	17 February 2012	Helong Stadium, Changsha, China	North Korea	1–1	1–1	Friendly
7.	25 June 2012	King Fahd Stadium, Ta'if, Saudi Arabia	Palestine	2–0	2–0	2012 Arab Nations Cup
8.	9 September 2013	Al-Sadaqua Walsalam Stadium, Kuwait City, Kuwait	Bahrain	2–1	2–1	Friendly
9.	8 November 2013	Al-Sadaqua Walsalam Stadium, Kuwait City, Kuwait	Malaysia	1–0	3–0	Friendly
10.	3 March 2014	Enghelab Stadium, Karaj, Iran	Iran	2–2	2–3	2015 AFC Asian Cup qualification

== Personal life ==
Fahad younger brother, Khalid, was another footballer and also played for Al Tadhamon, Al-Arabi and Al-Salmiya.
