= Faris Ghatasha =

Jordanian footballer (born 1997)

Personal information
- Full name: Faris Ahmad Abdel-Fattah Ghatasha
- Date of birth: April 30, 1997 (age 29)
- Place of birth: Riyadh, Saudi Arabia
- Height: 1.74 m (5 ft 9 in)
- Position: Attacking midfielder

Team information
- Current team: Doqara

Youth career
- –2015: Al-Yarmouk

Senior career*
Years	Team	Apps	(Gls)
2015–2019	Al-Yarmouk		
2019–2021	Ma'an		
2021	Ohod		
2021	Al-Jalil		
2021–2023	Al-Hussein		
2023	Al-Shabab		
2023–2025	East Riffa		
2025	Al-Arabi		
2025–2026	Al-Hussein	18	(2)
2026–	Doqara	0	(0)

International career^{‡}
2017	Jordan U23	1	(0)
- * Club domestic league appearances and goals as of 29 January 2026 ‡ National team caps and goals as of 18 August 2025

Faris Ahmad Abdel-Fattah Ghatasha (Arabic: فارس غطاشة; born 30 April 1997) is a professional footballer who plays as an attacking midfielder for Jordanian Pro League club Doqara. Born in Saudi Arabia, he represents Jordan at international level.

== Club career ==
=== Early career ===
Ghatasha began his career at Al-Yarmouk and rose through the club's ranks. He was also a member of the University of Petra football team.

=== Al-Hussein ===
On 5 August 2021, Ghatasha joined Al-Hussein as a replacement to the departing Omaya Al-Maaitah.

=== Al-Shabab ===
On 9 January 2023, Ghatasha moved to Bahraini Premier League club Al-Shabab on a four-month contract.

=== Al-Arabi ===
On 18 January 2025, Ghatasha joined UAE First Division League club Al-Arabi.

While at Al-Arabi, Ghatasha expressed his opinions on the state of Jordanian football and how he benefited from playing abroad.

=== Return to Al-Hussein ===
On 27 June 2025, Ghatasha returned to Jordan to play for defending champions Al-Hussein, his second tenure at the club.

== International career ==
Ghatasha was first called up to the Jordan under-23 squad for a training camp held in Muscat.
