= Ahmad Al-Harahsha =

Jordanian footballer

Personal information
- Full name: Ahmad Mousa Ahmad Al-Harahsha
- Date of birth: 12 May 2003 (age 23)
- Place of birth: Jordan
- Position: Forward

Team information
- Current team: Al-Jazeera
- Number: 88

Youth career
- Moghayer Al-Sarhan

Senior career*
Years	Team	Apps	(Gls)
2022–2025	Moghayer Al-Sarhan		
2025–2026	Al-Wehdat	19	(1)
2026–	Al-Jazeera	1	(3)

International career^{‡}
2025	Jordan U23	2	(0)
- * Club domestic league appearances and goals as of 5 September 2026 ‡ National team caps and goals as of 9 September 2025

Ahmad Al-Harahsha (Arabic: أحمد الحراحشة; born 12 May 2003) is a Jordanian professional footballer who plays as a forward for Jordanian Pro League club Al-Jazeera.

== Club career ==
=== Moghayer Al-Sarhan ===
Al-Harahsha started playing with Moghayer Al-Sarhan since at least their inaugural Jordanian Pro League season.

On 6 August 2024, Al-Harahsha's contract was renewed by the club, alongside various locally based players.

Al-Harahsha was noted for having a distinguished 2024–25 Jordanian Pro League season for Moghayer Al-Sarhan, being among the main contributors to the club. However, upon the club's relegation and the financial struggles that the club had faced, Al-Harahsha sought a move elsewhere.

=== Al-Wehdat ===
On 17 June 2025, Al-Harahsha joined Al-Wehdat on a two-season contract.

=== Al-Jazeera ===
On 2 September 2026, Al-Harahsha joined Al-Jazeera as a free agent. Three days later, Al-Harahsha had a standout performance during the opening day of the 2026–27 Jordanian Pro League season against defending champions Al-Hussein, scoring a hat-trick and assisting an additional goal in their 5–0 win.

== International career ==
On 15 May 2025, Al-Harahsha was called up to the Jordan U23 team for a training camp held in Tunisia.
