= Football at the 2011 Arab Games =

2011 Arab Games men's football tournament
Tournament details
- Host country: Qatar
- Dates: 10–23 December
- Teams: 12 (from 2 confederations)
- Venues: 3 (in 1 host city)

Final positions
- Champions: Bahrain (1st title)
- Runners-up: Jordan
- Third place: Kuwait
- Fourth place: Palestine

Tournament statistics
- Matches played: 16
- Goals scored: 31 (1.94 per match)
- Top scorer(s): (Jordan) Abdallah Deeb (4 goals)

The men's football tournament at the 2011 Arab Games was held in Al Rayyan, Qatar from 10 to 23 December. The tournament was played at three venues in one host city. Egypt were the defending champions from the 2007 Arab Games in Cairo. Bahrain clinched the Gold Medal after beating Jordan 1–0.

== Venues ==
City	Stadium	Capacity	Ref.
Al Rayyan	Ahmed bin Ali Stadium	21,282	
Al Rayyan	Al-Gharafa Stadium	25,000	
Al Rayyan	Jassim bin Hamad Stadium	15,000	

== Draw ==
The draw for the tournament was held on 30 October 2011 in Doha, Qatar.

Pot 1	Pot 2	Pot 3	Pot 4
Qatar; Libya; Saudi Arabia (Olympic)	Iraq; Kuwait; Jordan	Sudan; Oman (Olympic); Bahrain	Syria (withdrew); Palestine; Somalia (withdrew)

== Group stage ==
All times are Arabian Standard Time (AST) – UTC+3

Key to colours in group tables
Teams that advanced to the semi-finals

=== Group A ===
Team	Pld	W	D	L	GF	GA	GD	Pts
Bahrain	2	1	1	0	5	2	+3	4
Qatar	2	0	2	0	2	2	0	2
Iraq	2	0	1	1	0	3	−3	1

10 December 2011
17:30

Qatar	2–2	Bahrain
Al Marri 17'; Razak 34'	Report	Al-Husaini 71', 89'

Jassim bin Hamad Stadium, Al Rayyan
Referee: Redouane Jiyed (Morocco)

13 December 2011
17:30

Bahrain	3–0	Iraq
Hardan 41'; Abdul-Latif 63' (pen.), 70'	Report

Jassim bin Hamad Stadium, Al Rayyan
Referee: Khaled Abdurahaman (Sudan)

16 December 2011
19:30

Qatar	0–0	Iraq
	Report

Jassim bin Hamad Stadium, Al Rayyan
Referee: Djamel Haimoudi (Algeria)

=== Group B ===
Team	Pld	W	D	L	GF	GA	GD	Pts
Kuwait	2	2	0	0	4	0	+4	6
Saudi Arabia	2	0	1	1	0	2	−2	1
Oman	2	0	1	1	0	2	−2	1

11 December 2011
17:30

Saudi Arabia	0–0	Oman
	Report

Ahmed bin Ali Stadium, Al Rayyan
Referee: Mohamed Al-Zarouni (United Arab Emirates)

14 December 2011
17:30

Oman	0–2	Kuwait
	Report	Nasser 81', 90+2'

Ahmed bin Ali Stadium, Al Rayyan
Referee: Mohammad Abu Loum (Jordan)

17 December 2011
19:30

Saudi Arabia	0–2	Kuwait
	Report	Al Kandari 45+1'; Al-Mutawa 85' (pen.)

Ahmed bin Ali Stadium, Al Rayyan
Referee: Redouane Jiyed (Morocco)

=== Group C ===
Team	Pld	W	D	L	GF	GA	GD	Pts
Jordan	3	1	2	0	4	1	+3	5
Palestine	3	1	1	1	4	5	−1	4
Sudan	3	1	1	1	1	2	−1	4
Libya	3	0	2	1	1	2	−1	2

11 December 2011
17:30

Libya	0–1	Sudan
	Report	Ankba 81'

Al-Gharafa Stadium, Al Rayyan
Referee: Abdullah Balideh (Qatar)

11 December 2011
19:30

Jordan	4–1	Palestine
Al-Khalidi 14'; Abdallah Deeb 23' (pen.), 33'; Al-Dardour 83'	Report	Nu'man 34'

Al-Gharafa Stadium, Al Rayyan
Referee: Ali Sabah (Iraq)

14 December 2011
17:30

Sudan	0–0	Jordan
	Report

Al-Gharafa Stadium, Al Rayyan
Referee: Yosr Saadallah (Tunisia)

14 December 2011
19:30

Palestine	1–1	Libya
Zatara 88'	Report	Boussefi 41'

Al-Gharafa Stadium, Al Rayyan
Referee: Fahad Al-Mirdasi (Saudi Arabia)

17 December 2011
17:30

Sudan	0–2	Palestine
	Report	El-Khatib 39'; Al-Amour 62'

Ahmed bin Ali Stadium, Al Rayyan
Referee: Ali Al-Samahiji (Bahrain)

17 December 2011
17:30

Libya	0–0	Jordan
	Report

Jassim bin Hamad Stadium, Al Rayyan
Referee: Ibrahim Al-Hosni (Oman)

== Knockout stage ==
Semi-finals
20 December
Bahrain	3
Palestine	1
20 December
Kuwait	0
Jordan (a.e.t.)	2

Final
23 December
Bahrain	1
Jordan	0
Third place
22 December
Palestine	0
Kuwait (a.e.t.)	3

=== Semi-finals ===
20 December 2011
17:30

Bahrain	3–1	Palestine
Al Alawi 6'; Isa 44'; Abu Saleh 58' (o.g.)	Report	Nu'man 40' (pen.)

Al-Gharafa Stadium, Al Rayyan
Referee: Andre El Haddad (Lebanon)

20 December 2011
20:30

Kuwait	0–2 (a.e.t.)	Jordan
	Report	Abdallah Deeb 96', 119' (pen.)

Al-Gharafa Stadium, Al Rayyan
Referee: Djamel Haimoudi (Algeria)

=== Bronze medal match ===
22 December 2011
19:30

Palestine	0–3 (a.e.t.)	Kuwait
	Report	Al-Musawi 92'; Al-Rashidi 94'; Al-Mutawa 119'

Al-Gharafa Stadium, Al Rayyan
Referee: Mohamed Al-Zarouni (United Arab Emirates)

=== Gold medal match ===
23 December 2011
17:30

Bahrain	1–0	Jordan
Abdul-Latif 89'	Report

Jassim bin Hamad Stadium, Al Rayyan
Referee: Abdullah Balideh (Qatar)

== Final ranking ==
Pos	Team	Pld	W	D	L	GF	GA	GD	Pts	Final result
1st place, gold medalist(s)	Bahrain	4	3	1	0	9	3	+6	10	Gold Medal
2nd place, silver medalist(s)	Jordan	5	2	2	1	6	2	+4	8	Silver Medal
3rd place, bronze medalist(s)	Kuwait	4	3	0	1	7	2	+5	9	Bronze Medal
4	Palestine	5	1	1	3	5	11	−6	4	Fourth place
5	Sudan B	3	1	1	1	1	2	−1	4	Eliminated in group stage
6	Qatar (H)	2	0	2	0	2	2	0	2	Eliminated in group stage
7	Libya B	3	0	2	1	1	2	−1	2	Eliminated in group stage
8	Saudi Arabia U23	2	0	1	1	0	2	−2	1	Eliminated in group stage
9	Oman U23	2	0	1	1	0	2	−2	1	Eliminated in group stage
10	Iraq	2	0	1	1	0	3	−3	1	Eliminated in group stage
11	Syria	0	0	0	0	0	0	0	0	Withdrew
12	Somalia	0	0	0	0	0	0	0	0	Withdrew

Source: rsssf
(H) Hosts

== Scorers ==
4 goals

- (Jordan) Abdallah Deeb

3 goals

- (Bahrain) Ismail Abdul-Latif

2 goals

- (Bahrain) Sami Al-Husaini
- (Kuwait) Bader Al-Mutawa
- (Kuwait) Yousef Nasser
- (Palestine) Ashraf Nu'man

1 goal

- (Bahrain) Fahad Hardan
- (Bahrain) Mohamed Al-Alawi
- (Bahrain) Salman Isa
- (Jordan) Hamza Al-Dardour
- (Jordan) Rakan Al-Khalidi
- (Kuwait) Ali Al Kandari
- (Kuwait) Fahad Al-Rashidi
- (Kuwait) Hussain Al-Musawi
- (Libya) Ihaab Boussefi
- (Palestine) Ismail Al-Amour
- (Palestine) Ali El-Khatib
- (Palestine) Imad Zatara
- (Qatar) Jaralla Al Marri
- (Qatar) Mohammed Razak
- (Sudan) Mohamed Abd Al Momen Ankba

1 own goal

- (Palestine) Hussam Abu Saleh
