= Minorities in Jordan =

Minorities in Jordan refers to the various ethnic and religious groups within Jordan that differ from the majority Arab and Sunni Muslim population. These groups include long-established communities such as Circassians, Armenians, and Christians, as well as large populations of Palestinians and more recent refugee groups. The composition and status of minorities in Jordan have been shaped by historical migration, regional conflicts, and state policies, particularly those related to Jordanian nationality law and citizenship. While some minority groups are fully integrated into Jordanian political and social life, others, especially refugee populations, experience varying degrees of legal and economic marginalization.

== Historical background ==
The composition of minorities in Jordan has been shaped by longstanding patterns of migration, imperial politics, conflict, and state formation in the Levant. Prior to the modern era, the territory that would become Jordan was part of Bilad al‑Sham under Ottoman rule from the early 16th century until the empire's dissolution after World War I, with a predominantly Bedouin Arab tribal population and small settled communities in the northwest.

During the late Ottoman period, significant waves of migration from the Caucasus occurred as Muslim communities such as Circassians and Chechens were displaced by the expansion of the Russian Empire in the 19th century. These refugees were resettled by Ottoman authorities in peripheral zones of Ottoman Syria, including Transjordan, where they founded or revitalized several settlements.

The creation of the Emirate of Transjordan in 1921 under British Mandate rule marked a decisive moment in the modern political formation of the kingdom. Emir Abdullah I consolidated a state that blended Bedouin tribal authorities with newly arrived minority communities, incorporating Circassians and Chechens into the nascent army and administration, roles that would continue into the later Hashemite Kingdom of Jordan following full independence in 1946.

A major demographic transformation occurred in the mid‑20th century with the Palestinian refugee crises. The 1948 Arab–Israeli War and the establishment of Israel precipitated the Nakba, displacing hundreds of thousands of Palestinians. Many sought refuge in neighboring countries, with a large influx into Jordan, altering its population structure. This initial wave was followed by a second significant displacement after the Six‑Day War in 1967, when Israeli occupation of the West Bank and East Jerusalem led to further Palestinian flight into Jordan. These migrations increased Jordan's population significantly, as well as introduced new social, economic and political dynamics surrounding citizenship, identity and state‑society relations.

In subsequent decades, additional waves of migration and mobility, linked to regional conflicts and labor migration have continued to shape Jordan's minority landscape, including later arrivals from Iraq and Syria, and smaller diasporic communities from elsewhere in the Arab world and beyond. Collectively, these historical processes have made Jordan one of the more demographically complex societies in the Middle East, characterized by the interplay between indigenous communities, long‑established minorities with deep historical roots, and more recent refugees and migrant populations.

== Palestinian refugees ==
Jordan hosts the largest population of Palestinian refugees, many of whom arrived after the 1948 Arab-Israeli War and the 1967 Six-Day War. Unlike most other Arab host states, Jordan not only absorbed large numbers of refugees, but also, following its formal annexation of the West Bank from 1950 to 1967, granted most Palestinians and their descendants Jordanian citizenship. This made Jordan unique among Arab host countries in fully integrating many Palestinian refugees as citizens rather than leaving them stateless. As a result, a large proportion of Jordanians of Palestinian origin today (constituting approximately half of the population) hold full citizenship and are integrated into Jordanian society. Consequently, discussions about Palestinians in Jordan often distinguish between Jordanians of Palestinian descent and Palestinian refugees who retain a distinct political and legal status. As of December 2025, UNRWA figures list over 2.4 million Palestinian refugees registered in Jordan, representing approximately 40% of all Palestinian refugees registered with the agency.

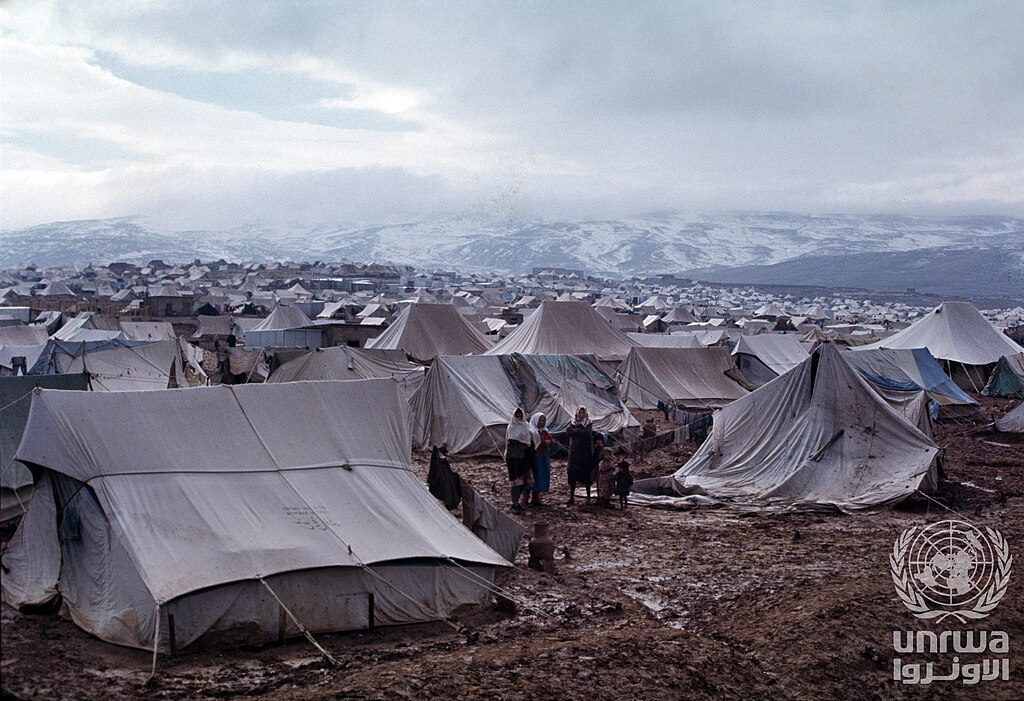
Baqa'a refugee camp in 1967

Palestinians in Jordan are predominantly concentrated in urban governorates, as well as in long‑standing refugee camps like Baqa’a and Al‑Wehdat, which have evolved into dense, semi‑urbanized communities with their own social and economic networks. Their integration into Jordanian society has been multifaceted. While many Palestinians in Jordan possess citizenship rights, some groups, particularly Palestinians displaced from Gaza after 1967, remain without full Jordanian nationality and may face restrictions in areas such as employment, political participation, and access to public services.

Many Jordanians of Palestinian origin have attained high levels of education and have been prominent in business, academia, and civil society. However, the relationship between Jordanians of Palestinian origin and East Bank Jordanians has also been marked by persistent social and political distinctions. Issues such as access to public sector employment, patterns of political representation, and debates over national identity have at times highlighted real and perceived differences between communities, reflecting both historical legacies and contemporary anxieties about demographic balance and political influence.

== Major minority groups ==
=== Ethnic minorities ===
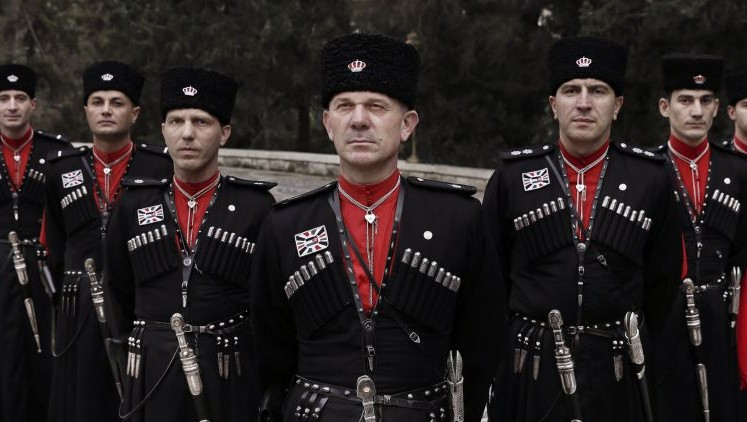
Royal Circassian Guards

==== Circassians and Chechens ====
Circassians and Chechens are among the earliest non-Arab communities to settle in the territory of modern Jordan. Originally displaced from the Caucasus during the 19th century by the Russian Empire, they played a role in the establishment of early settlements and institutions in Jordan. These groups have historically maintained a distinct cultural identity while also becoming closely integrated into the Jordanian state.

Although Arabic is dominant in everyday life, both communities retain cultural institutions and organizations aimed at preserving heritage, and there continues to be interest in ancestral languages and customs. There are around 100,000 to 170,000 Circassians and around 30,000 Chechens. These groups have been particularly prominent in the military and security sectors and are formally represented in parliament through reserved seats. A legacy reflected in the ceremonial role of Circassian palace guards who serve as the personal guard of the Jordanian monarchy across successive Hashemite reigns.

==== Armenians ====
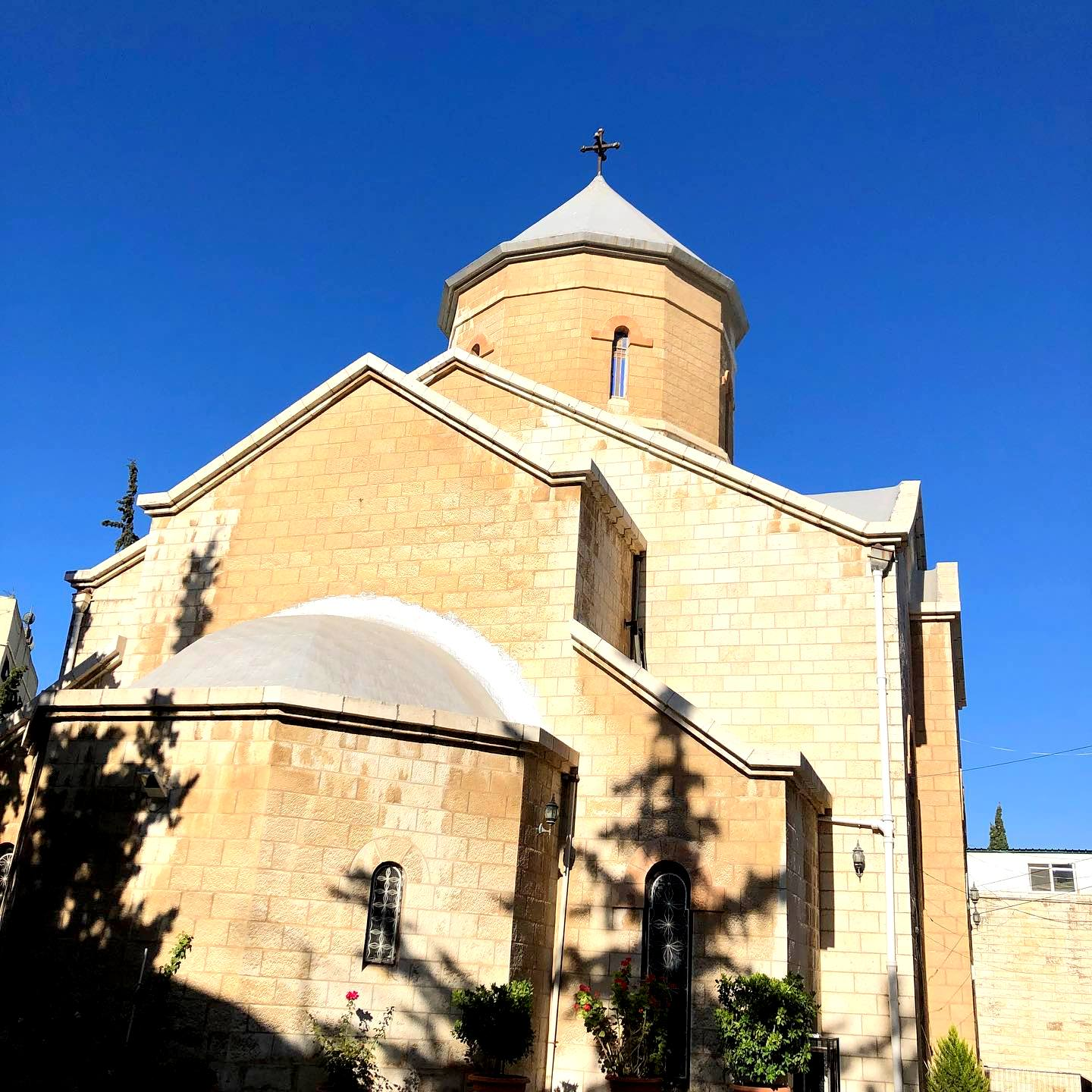
St. Thaddeus Armenian Apostolic Church in Amman

Armenians represent one of the country's smaller but long‑established non‑Arab minority communities. The majority of Jordan's Armenian community are descendants of survivors of the Armenian genocide during World War I. After the 1948 Arab–Israeli War, another wave of Armenian refugees arrived from Palestine, contributing to an increase in community numbers during the mid‑20th century. At their peak, estimates suggest that around 10,000 Armenians lived in Jordan in the mid‑20th century, but subsequent waves of emigration from the 1950s through the 1970s led to a significant decline in population, resulting in a present‑day community of about 3,000 people. Today's community is primarily made up of Western Armenian speakers and is the largest non‑Arab Christian minority in the country.

The Armenian Apostolic Church, under the jurisdiction of the Armenian Patriarchate of Jerusalem, is the principal religious institution for most Armenians in Jordan. A smaller number of community members belong to the Armenian Catholic Church. Armenian institutions, including elementary schools, cultural associations and social clubs, play an important role in maintaining Armenian identity and heritage, with many based in the historic Armenian quarter of Amman's Jabal al‑Ashrafieh neighborhood.

=== Religious minorities ===
==== Christians ====
Christian communities in Jordan belong to various denominations, including the Greek Orthodox Church, Roman Catholic (Latin) Church, and various Eastern Catholic and Protestant communities, reflecting the broader ecclesiastical diversity of the Levant. Christian populations have historically been concentrated in areas such as As-Salt, Al-Karak, Madaba, Fuheis, and parts of Amman, with traditions tracing continuity to the Byzantine period and earlier. Christians are generally believed to constitute around 2-4% of the population, and although their proportion has declined over time, they remain an influential minority.

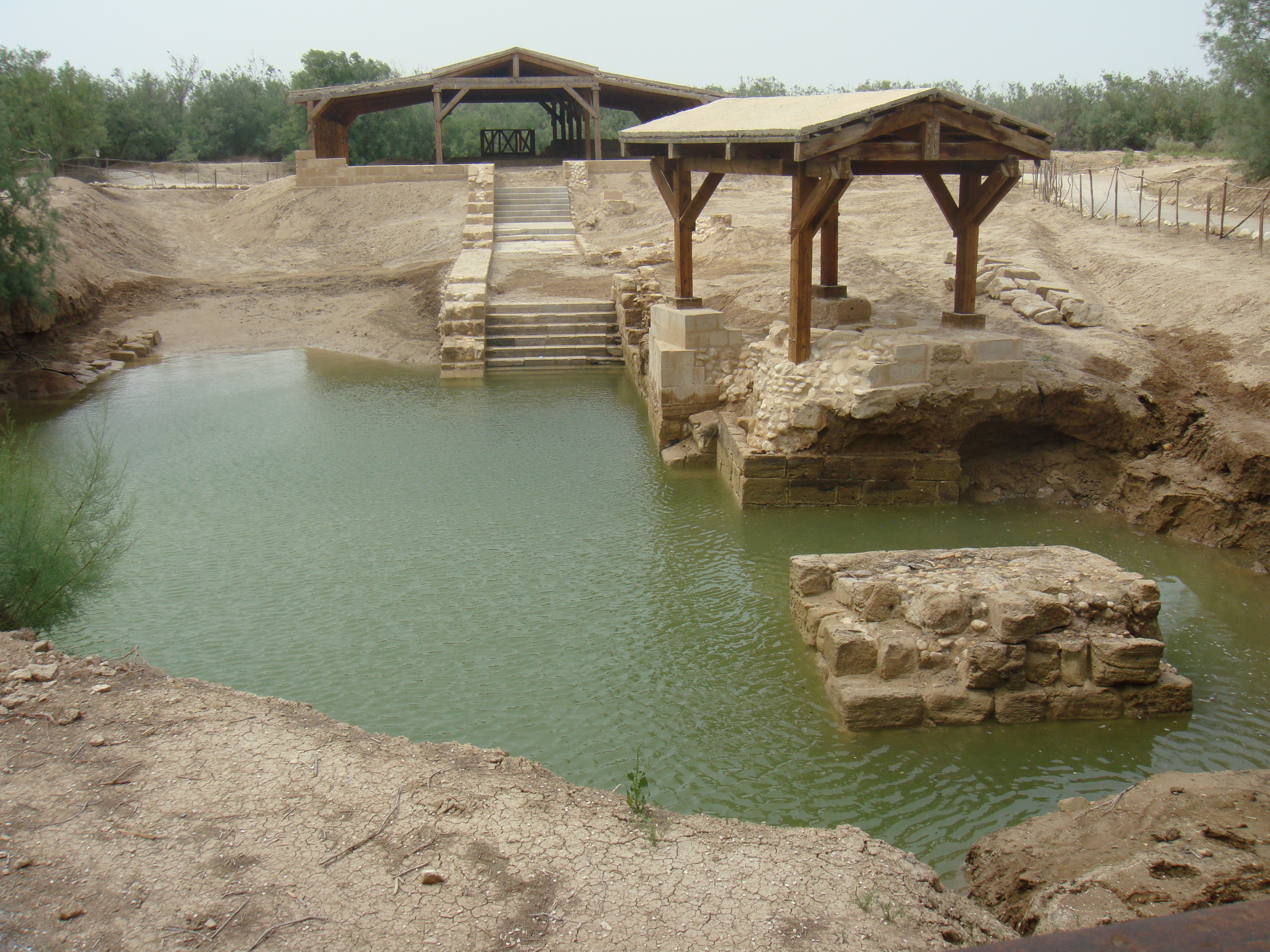
Bethany Beyond the Jordan (Al-Maghtas)

The Jordanian state formally recognizes several Christian denominations and guarantees a degree of religious freedom, while also ensuring political representation through reserved seats in the House of Representatives. They have historically played significant roles in sectors such as education, healthcare, and business, and maintain a range of religious and educational institutions across the country.

Religious and cultural life among Christians is sustained through a network of churches, schools, and community organizations, as well as through pilgrimage and heritage sites of global significance, such as Bethany Beyond the Jordan (Al-Maghtas), identified as the site of the baptism of Jesus. At the same time, Jordanian Christians navigate broader regional trends affecting Middle Eastern Christian populations, including concerns over emigration and the preservation of communal identity. Nevertheless, within Jordan, Christians are widely regarded as an integral component of the country's religious pluralism and social fabric, benefiting from a comparatively stable environment and state policies that emphasize coexistence and interfaith harmony.

=== Refugees and non-citizen populations ===
==== Syrians ====
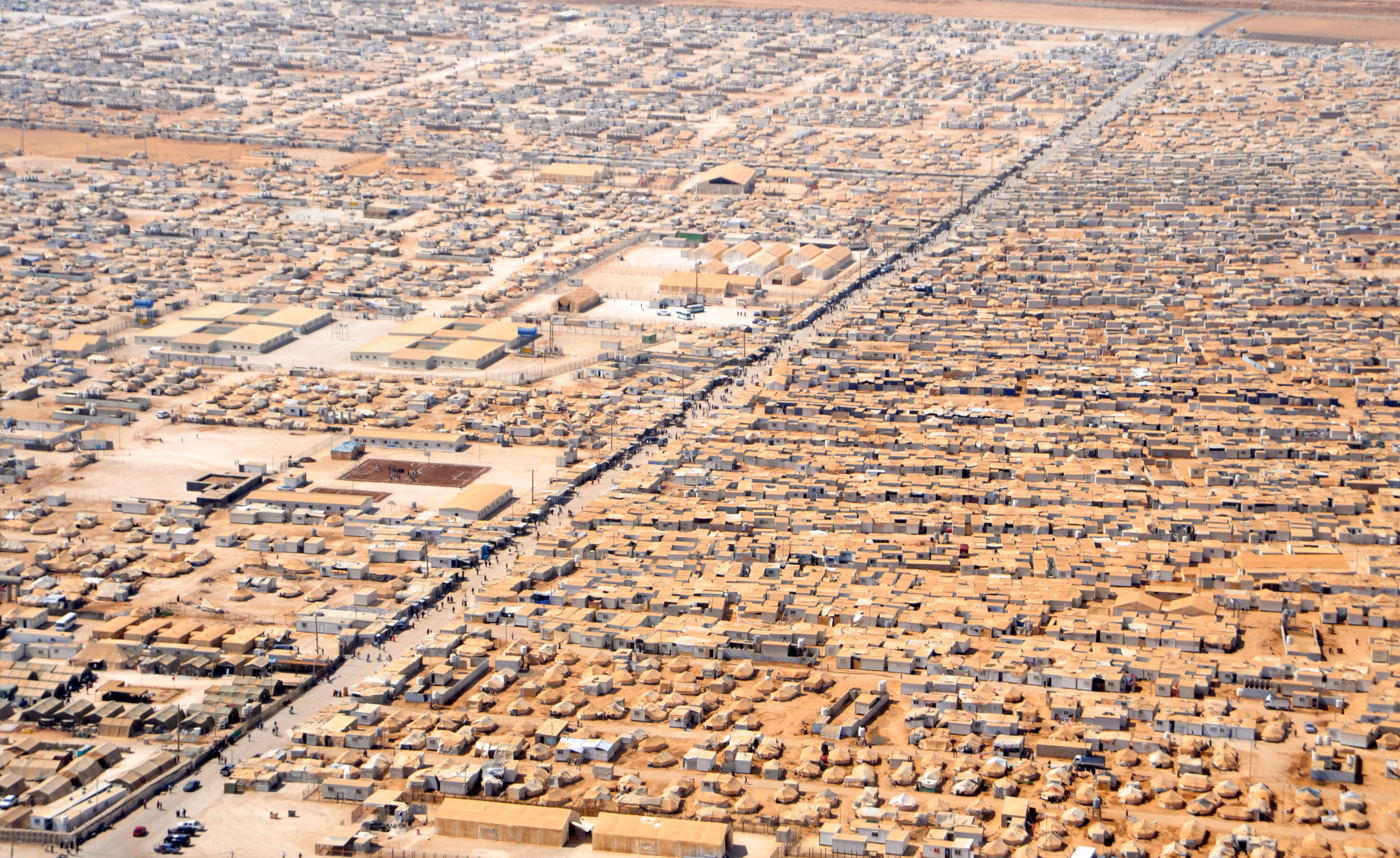
Aerial view of the Za'tari refugee camp

In addition to long-established minorities, Jordan hosts significant refugee populations, particularly from neighboring countries. Syrians constitute the largest refugee and non‑citizen population in Jordan, primarily as a result of the Syrian civil war. Jordan has hosted significant numbers of Syrian refugees for over a decade, with registered figures historically reaching over 650,000 individuals, though numbers have fluctuated due to returns and changes in registration. As of 2026, United Nations High Commissioner for Refugees (UNHCR) registration data indicates several hundred thousand Syrian refugees remain in the country. The total Syrian population in Jordan, including unregistered refugees, dependents, and long‑term migrants, was estimated at 1.2-1.3 million at various points, reflecting both camp‑based and urban populations. Major concentrations are found in refugee camps like Zaatari.

Due to Jordan's non‑party status to the 1951 Refugee Convention and its 1967 Protocol, Syrians are generally designated as refugees under temporary protection measures, which afford access to education, health services, and, in recent years, limited formal employment in designated sectors rather than full refugee status under Jordanian law. Most Syrian refugees reside outside formal camps, living within Jordanian communities where they face challenges tied to economic insecurity, rising living costs, and limited livelihood opportunities. Over time, a portion of the Syrian refugee population has engaged in voluntary return movements to Syria as conditions have evolved, but significant legal, economic, and administrative barriers persist for many contemplating return, leaving a substantial displaced population still reliant on humanitarian assistance and host community support.

==== Iraqis ====
Iraqis represent a significant displaced and migrant population within Jordan, shaped by successive waves of emigration driven by conflict, political upheaval, and insecurity in Iraq. Large numbers first arrived in the 1990s in the aftermath of the Gulf War and subsequent sanctions, with numbers increasing substantially following the 2003 U.S.‑led invasion and the rise of ISIS. Estimates of the Iraqi population in Jordan vary due to the lack of formal refugee recognition and comprehensive registration. Earlier surveys by research organizations such as Fafo suggested that between 450,000 and 500,000 Iraqis were residing in Jordan in the late 2000s, many relying on savings or remittances, though only a fraction were registered with the UNHCR and even fewer held valid residence permits linked to employment.

The population is diverse in ethnic and religious composition, including Sunni and Shia Muslims as well as Christian minorities, with social and legal statuses ranging from those with formal residency to others living without legal authorization. Jordan is not a signatory to the 1951 Refugee Convention and traditionally regards Iraqis as “guests” rather than formal refugees, a policy that has limited access to official protection mechanisms, employment rights, and public services, and has led many Iraqis to live economically and legally precarious lives.

==== Egyptians ====
Egyptians constitute a significant portion of the country's migrant population. According to the 2015 Jordanian census, there were approximately 636,270 Egyptian nationals in Jordan, making Egyptians the third largest foreign group in the country after Syrians and Palestinians. Egyptians in Jordan are primarily concentrated in urban centers, where labor demand is highest. The Egyptian community in Jordan is predominantly composed of economic migrants rather than refugees, drawn by labor opportunities in sectors such as construction, agriculture, domestic work, and services. Unlike Syrian and Palestinian refugees, most Egyptians migrate under labor or residency arrangements, though a sizeable share work informally without official work permits.

Historically, Egyptian labor migration to Jordan has been sustained over decades, with networks of recruitment brokers, personal connections, and family ties playing a central role in migration flows and job placement. Wage differentials and limited economic opportunities in Egypt continue to drive many, particularly young men, to seek work in Jordan to support families and remit income back home. While Egyptians in Jordan are generally not classified as refugees under international law, their presence highlights the broader role of labor migration and transnational livelihoods in the country's demographic and economic landscape.

==== Other (Arab) ====
Jordan also hosts smaller but noteworthy populations of other Arab nationals who contribute to the diversity of non‑citizen residents, from countries such as Yemen, Sudan, and Libya. Many arrived in successive waves due to conflict, political instability, and economic hardship in their countries of origin. These groups are typically concentrated in urban areas, particularly in Amman. These populations have received comparatively limited international attention and assistance, resulting in greater reliance on informal labor markets and community networks. Employment is often found in low-wage sectors such as service work, manual labor, and small-scale trade, though legal restrictions frequently limit formal participation in the economy. Their legal status is often precarious, with many lacking clear pathways to long-term residency or citizenship. As a result, these groups experience heightened vulnerability in areas such as housing, healthcare, and education.

==== Migrant labor ====
In addition to refugee populations, Jordan also hosts significant numbers of migrant workers, who particularly work in domestic services, agriculture, and construction. Many of these workers originate from countries in South-East Asia and East Africa, migrating to Jordan under temporary labor arrangements, known as the kafala system. Jordan hosts roughly 312,000 to 341,000 registered migrant workers, but official figures often fail to account for the large number of undocumented workers, with unofficial estimates suggesting the actual number exceeds 1.5 million. Although not typically categorized as ethnic or religious minorities, their non-citizen status and limited legal protections place them in a similarly vulnerable position, with restricted labor rights and dependence on employer sponsorship systems.

== Legal and political status ==
The legal and political status of minority groups in Jordan is shaped by a combination of citizenship law and administrative categorization, which distinguish sharply between citizens and non-citizens. Under Jordanian nationality law, full political rights, including voting, representation, and access to public sector employment, are tied to citizenship, creating a stratified system in which different minority groups experience varying degrees of inclusion. While some long-established minorities such as Circassians and Chechens are fully integrated as citizens with formal political representation, other populations, particularly refugees and migrant workers, are governed through distinct legal regimes that limit their rights and access to state resources.

The case of Palestinians in Jordan illustrates the complexity of this system. Although a large proportion were granted Jordanian citizenship, not all Palestinians enjoy equal legal status. Most refugees that arrived after the Nakba in 1948 hold full Jordanian citizenship. Gazans that arrived after 1967 are treated as stateless/non-citizens who require residency permits subject to the approval of the General Intelligence Department, and receive a 2-year temporary passport as well as a 'blue card' for family reunification. West Bank Palestinians that arrived after 1967 are treated as permanent residents who often possess 'yellow cards' for family reunification and a 5-year passport with a national number. Those residing in the West Bank may have a 5-year passport without national numbers, holding a 'green card'.

Other refugee populations, including Iraqis and Syrians, are generally not granted citizenship and are instead treated as temporary guests under humanitarian protection frameworks. Jordan is not a signatory to the 1951 Refugee Convention. Instead, it manages refugee populations through memoranda of understanding with international organizations such as the UNHCR. As a result, refugees often have limited political rights, restricted access to formal employment, and varying levels of access to public services, depending on shifting government policies and international support.

Migrant workers from Asian and African countries occupy another distinct legal category, typically regulated under the kafala system, which ties residency and work permits to individual employers. This system has been widely criticized for creating structural vulnerabilities. While Jordanian labor law formally extends protections to foreign workers, enforcement remains uneven, and many migrants work in informal conditions that further complicate their legal status.

A further dimension of legal differentiation in Jordan concerns individuals born to Jordanian mothers and non-Jordanian fathers, who are not automatically granted citizenship under current nationality laws (Law No.56 of 1954). Despite often being raised in Jordan, these individuals may lack access to full citizenship rights, including political participation and certain forms of public employment. While the Jordanian government has introduced administrative measures to improve access to services such as education, healthcare, and employment, these do not amount to full citizenship rights. As a result, many continue to face legal and socio-economic limitations compared to citizens, particularly in areas such as residency rights and access to state benefits. The issue has been the subject of ongoing public debate and advocacy, reflecting broader tensions in Jordanian nationality law related to gender, identity, and the boundaries of state membership.

At the institutional level, the Jordanian political system incorporates mechanisms of minority representation and controlled pluralism. Certain groups, including Christians and Circassians/Chechens, are allocated reserved seats in the House of Representatives, reflecting a model of inclusion that recognizes communal diversity. More broadly, the state has historically pursued a strategy of balancing integration with administrative control, particularly in relation to populations whose presence is linked to regional displacement and labor migration. This approach has enabled relative stability while also producing a layered system of rights and belonging, in which legal status, citizenship, and origin continue to shape the lived experiences of minority communities in Jordan.

== See also ==
- Jordan
- Demographics of Jordan
- Religion in Jordan
- Christianity in Jordan
- Palestinians in Jordan
- Armenians in Jordan
- Chechens in Jordan
- Circassians in Jordan
- Syrian refugees in Jordan
