= Ahmed Abdel-Qader =

Jordanian football coach (born 1968)

Personal information
- Full name: Ahmed Abdel-Qader Abu Ismail
- Date of birth: November 10, 1968 (age 58)
- Place of birth: Sahab, Jordan
- Height: 1.86 m (6 ft 1 in)
- Position: Left-back

Team information
- Current team: Doqara

Youth career
- 1984–1986: Sahab

Senior career*
Years	Team	Apps	(Gls)
1986–1998	Sahab	?	(?)

International career
1992–1996	Jordan	26	(2)

Managerial career
- 1999–2003: Sahab
- 2003: That Ras
- 2004–2007: Jordan U-20 (Assistant)
- 2007–2008: Jordan U-20
- 2008–2009: That Ras
- 2008–2013: Jordan (Assistant)
- 2013: Shabab Al-Ordon
- 2013–2014: Saham
- 2014: Jordan
- 2014–2015: Jordan (Assistant)
- 2015: Al-Faisaly
- 2016–2018: Jordan U-20
- 2018–2020: Jordan U-23
- 2021: Sahab
- 2026-: Doqara
- * Club domestic league appearances and goals

Ahmed Abdel-Qader Abu Ismail (Arabic: أحمد عبد القادر أبو إسماعيل; born 10 November 1968) is a Jordanian football manager and former player who currently coaches the Jordanian club Doqara.

== International goals ==
#	Date	Venue	Opponent	Score	Result	Competition
1	18 August 1992	Amman	Sudan	3–0	Win	Jordan International Tournament
2	26 August 1992	Amman	Congo	2–1	Win	Jordan International Tournament

== Managerial career ==
=== Jordan ===
In 2005, Abdel-Qader was appointed as assistant coach of Jordan national under-20 football team where he served under the Danish coach Jan Poulsen from 2005 to 2007. Abdel-Qader is known for helping the Jordan U-20 team qualify for the 2007 FIFA U-20 World Cup in Canada after securing fourth place in the 2006 AFC Youth Championship in India. After Jordan's elimination from the group stage in the 2007 FIFA U-20 World Cup, Abdel-Qader was appointed as head coach of Jordan U-20 until 2008.

Abdel-Qader was appointed as assistant coach of the Jordan national football team where he served under the Portuguese coach Nelo Vingada in 2008 and the Iraqi coach Adnan Hamad from 2009 to 2013.

== Achievements as manager ==
=== Honors ===
- With Jordan (Assistant)
- Pan Arab Games (0):

- Runners-up 2011 Pan Arab Games
