= Walid Chattaoui =

Tunisian footballer

Personal information
- Date of birth: 5 August 1978 (age 48)

Senior career*
Years	Team	Apps	(Gls)
–2006	AS Marsa		
2006–2007	CS Hammam-Lif		
2007–2008	Stade Gabèsien		
2008–2009	EGS Gafsa		
2009–2011	ES Zarzis		

Managerial career
- 2018: Stade Gabèsien
- 2019: US Tataouine
- * Club domestic league appearances and goals

Walid Chattaoui (born 5 August 1978) is a Tunisian retired footballer and later manager.
