= Rakan Al-Khalidi =

Jordanian footballer

Personal information
- Full name: Rakan Bani Khaled Al-Khalidi
- Date of birth: 21 October 1988 (age 38)
- Place of birth: Mafraq, Jordan
- Height: 1.78 m (5 ft 10 in)
- Position: Striker

Senior career*
Years	Team	Apps	(Gls)
2006–2014	Al-Ramtha		
2014	Al-Jazeera		
2014–2015	Al-Ramtha		
2015–2016	Al-Ahli		
2016–2017	Sahab		
2017	Al-Ahli		
2017–2019	Mansheyat Bani Hasan		
2019–2021	Ma'an		
2021–2022	Al-Salt		
2023	Dougra		
2024–2025	Al-Baqa'a		

International career^{‡}
2011–2015	Jordan	16	(2)
- * Club domestic league appearances and goals ‡ National team caps and goals as of 15 November 2016

Rakan Al-Khalidi (Arabic: ركان الخالدي) is a retired Jordanian footballer.

== International career ==
Rakan's first international match with the Jordan national team was against Palestine in Doha on 11 December 2011 in the 2011 Pan Arab Games, in which Jordan won 4–1.

=== International goals ===
#	Date	Venue	Opponent	Score	Result	Competition
1	11 December 2011	Doha	Palestine	4-1	Win	2011 Pan Arab Games
2	6 November 2013	Doha	Zambia	1-0	Win	Friendly

== Honors and Participation in International Tournaments ==
=== In Pan Arab Games ===
- 2011 Pan Arab Games

=== In WAFF Championships ===
- 2012 WAFF Championship
