= Armenians in Jordan =

Ethnic group in Jordan

Total population
- 3,000

Regions with significant populations
- Amman, Ma'an, Shobak, Al Karak, Madaba, Russeifa, Zarqa, Irbid, Aqaba

Languages
- Armenian, Jordanian Arabic

Religion
- Armenian Apostolic Church

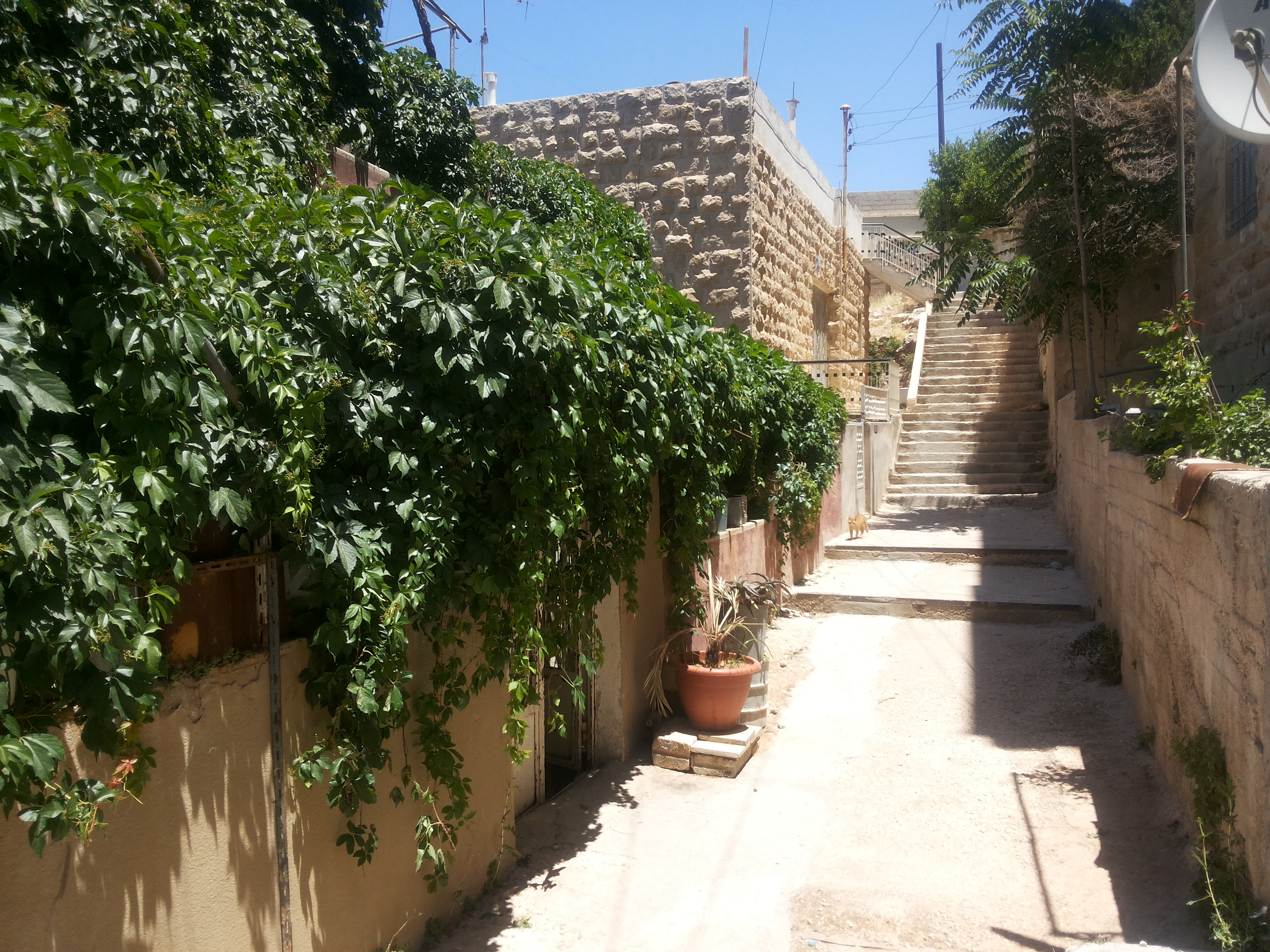
A house inside Armenian Quarter in Amman, Jordan.

Armenians in Jordan are ethnic Armenians living in the Hashemite Kingdom of Jordan. There are an estimated 3,000 Armenians living in the country, with an estimated 2,500 of them being members of the Armenian Apostolic Church, and they predominantly speak Western Armenian dialect. Armenians make up the biggest majority of non-Arab Christians in the country.

There were about 6,000 Armenians living in Jordan during the period 1930-1946. After the 1948 Arab–Israeli War, a new wave of immigrants came from Palestine to Jordan increasing the number of Armenians to about 10,000. However, starting in the 1950s, and particularly after the 1967 Arab-Israeli Six-Day War, Jordan witnessed the emigration of many Armenians to Australia, Canada and the United States of America, a trend that continued in the 1970s, reducing the numbers of Jordanian Armenians to about 3,000.

The majority of these Armenians are the descendants of survivors from the Armenian genocide during World War I, who were deported from the Ottoman Empire in Anatolia and Cilicia or fled to Syria and then Jordan. The early Armenian refugees in Jordan resided mainly in places like Ma'an, Shobak, Al Karak, Madaba and Russeifa. Nowadays, the majority of the Armenians live in the capital Amman, with a few families in Irbid, Aqaba, Madaba and Zarqa.

Armenians have worked in photography, fashion, car mechanics and in professional businesses and small trade.

Most Armenian organizations, schools and religious structures are located in Amman's Jabal Al-Ashrafieh neighborhood, also commonly called the Armenian Neighborhood (in Arabic: حي الأرمن pronounced Hayy al-Arman).

== Religion ==
While most Armenians have now moved out of the Armenian quarter in Amman, the Armenian quarter currently comprises two Armenian churches.

Armenians in Jordan are mainly followers of the Armenian Apostolic Church, under the jurisdiction of the Armenian Patriarchate of Jerusalem. The patriarch of Jerusalem assigns a bishop to the Jordanian diocese. A small minority of Armenians in Jordan belong to the Armenian Catholic Church.

The churches:

- Armenian Apostolic Church (Hayasdanyayts Arakelagan) St. Thaddeus Church (located in Amman).
- Armenian Apostolic Church (Hayasdanyayts Arakelagan) St. Garebed Church} (located in Baptism Site Jordan River).
- Armenian Catholic Church (Hay Gatogheege) Our Lady of the Assumption (located in Amman).

== Education ==
Armenian education is very important in maintaining Armenian language and identity among the Armenian community in Jordan. Amman is host to many Armenian institutions, long-running schools and cultural associations. Armenian students, who graduate from those community schools, can immediately enter the Jordanian High school system, after passing the elementary school classes.

First Armenian school was founded in Jabal Al-Natheef in Amman. Called Hetoumyan Azkayeen Varjaran, it operated in the 1930s. Another smaller school operated in Russeifa founded by Samuel Agha Serpekian.

Currently, two Armenian elementary schools operate in Amman:

- Armenian General Benevolent Union (AGBU's) Gulbenkian Youzbeshian Varjaran (school) founded 1962. It is located in Ashrafieh region in Amman. It teaches Armenian literature, history and religion in Armenian in addition to the general school curriculum set by the Jordanian Ministry of Education.
- Saints Sahag and Mesrob Armenian Catholic School - also located in Ashrafieh, Amman.

== Organizations ==
The majority of Armenian organizations are based in Amman. Those organizations aim to serve as a gathering for members of the Armenian community through engaging in various activities such as arts and culture, sports, dance, scouting, women activities, youth and charitable associations, and celebration of national events.

Associations based in Amman

- Homenetmen: An Armenian sports and scouting club, it was founded in 1945, according to the records of the Jordanian Higher Council of Youth. Club's current headquarters is in Al-Ashrafieh and was built back in 1967.
- Armenian Relief Society: Jordan ARS Established in 1965, according to the General Federation of Charities in Jordan, but the activities of the association go back to 1947. The headquarters is in Al-Ashrafieh.
- Watany Sporting Club {Ազգային Մարզական Միութիւն}: WSC was founded in 1955. The club's current headquarters is in Al-Ashrafieh. It was built in 1974. The club also runs a summer resort was built in 1994 at Airport Street.

Armenian Dance Groups in Amman

- Araz Dance Group, Armenian Relief Society
- Spitak Armenian folklore Dance Group (in Armenian Սպիտակ Պարախումբ) run by Watany Sporting Club (WSC) (in Armenian Ազգային Մարզական Միութիւն (ԱՄՄ))

Armenian sports clubs

Armenians in Jordan participated in many of Jordan national leagues and Sport tournaments presented by the two clubs in Jordan Homenetmen and Watany Sporting Club.

WSC currently have a Chess Team and active in Jordan League tournaments, and hosted many tournaments on the occasion of King Abdullah's Birthday and Jordan Independence Day for the last decade.

Basketball is the most prominent of the activities of the two Armenian sports clubs Watany Sporting Club and Homenetmen. They both had prominent basketball teams and played in the official Jordanian Basketball League in first and second division starting 1950s and until the 1990s.

Some Jordanian Armenian players have represented Jordan and were members of the Jordanian National Basketball Team. In addition, Watany Sporting Club won Jordanian Basketball League tournament in 1963.

== See also ==
- Armenia–Jordan relations
- Armenian Quarter of Jerusalem
- Armenian diaspora
- Armenians in the Middle East
- Minorities in Jordan
