= Demographics of Jordan =

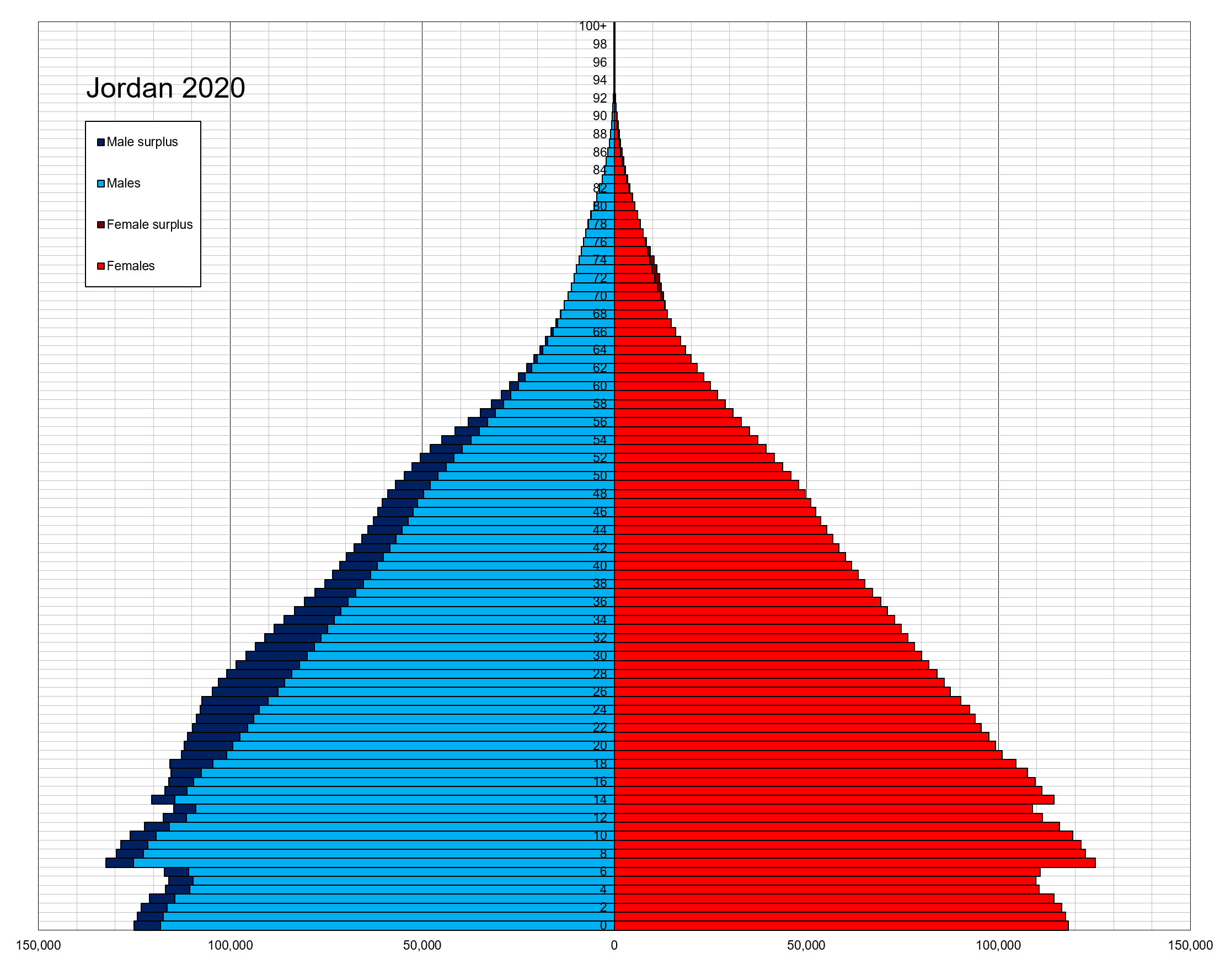
- Jordan population pyramid in 2020
- Population: 2023 census: 11,180,568 (84th); 2019 estimate: 10,392,309 (86th)
- Density: 116/km^{2} (300/sq mi) (70th)
- Growth rate: 2.05% (2017 est.)
- Birth rate: 17.9 births/1,000 population
- Death rate: 3.6 deaths/1,000 population
- Life expectancy: 74.8 years (2017 est.)
  - male: 73.4 years
  - female: 76.3 years
- Fertility rate: 2.6 children born/woman
- Immigrant share: 45.7% (2024)

Age structure
- 0–14 years: 34.4%
- 15–64 years: 62,02%
- 65 and over: 3.7%

Sex ratio
- Total: 1.11 male(s)/female (2016 est.)
- At birth: 1.06 male(s)/female
- Under 15: 1.05 male(s)/female
- 15–64 years: 1.18 male(s)/female
- 65 and over: 0.89 male(s)/female

Nationality
- Nationality: Jordanian
- Major ethnic: Arabs
- Minor ethnic: Circassians; Doms; Afro-Arabs; Others

Language
- Official: Modern Standard Arabic
- Spoken: Jordanian Arabic, English

Jordan has a population of more than 11.1 million inhabitants as of 2023. Jordanians (Arabic: أردنيون) are the citizens of Jordan. Approximately 98% of Jordanians are Arabs, many of whom are of Palestinian origin. The remaining 2% belong to ethnic minorities, including Circassians, Chechens, Assyrians, Armenians and Kurds. In early 2016 about 30% of the population were non-citizens, a figure including refugees, and legal and illegal immigrants. Jordan's annual population growth rate stands at 3.05% as of 2023, with an average birth rate of 2.8. There were 1,977,534 households in Jordan in 2015, with an average of 4.8 persons per household.

The official language is Arabic, while English is the second most widely spoken language by Jordanians. It is also widely used in commerce and government. In 2016, about 84% of Jordan's population live in urban towns and cities. Many Jordanians and people of Jordanian descent live across the world, mainly in the Gulf Cooperation Council Countries, United States, Canada and Turkey.

In 2016, Jordan was named as the largest refugee hosting country per capita in the world, followed by Turkey, Pakistan and Lebanon. Jordan hosts refugees mainly from Palestine, Syria, and Iraq, as well as smaller communities from other nations. There are also hundreds of thousands of workers from Egypt, Indonesia and South Asia, who work as domestic and construction workers.

View source data.
View source data.

== Definition ==
The territory of Jordan can be defined by the history of its creation following events after the end of World War I, the League of Nations and redrawing of the borders of the Eastern Mediterranean littoral. The ensuing decisions, most notably the Sykes–Picot Agreement, which created the Mandatory Palestine. In September 1922, Transjordan was formally identified as a subdivision of the Mandate Palestine after the League of Nations approved the British Transjordan memorandum which stated that the Mandate east of the Jordan River would be excluded from all the provisions dealing with Jewish settlement west of the Jordan River.

== Population size and structure ==
Historical population
Year	Pop.	±% p.a.
1800	130,450	—
1900	254,431	+0.67%
1947	368,401	+0.79%
1952	504,575	+6.49%
1961	891,874	+6.53%
1970	1,508,200	+6.01%
1980	2,233,200	+4.00%
1990	3,468,000	+4.50%
2000	4,857,000	+3.43%
2010	6,698,000	+3.27%
2020	10,928,721	+5.02%

11,200,320 (According to the Population Clock as of July 23, 2022).

=== Refugees ===
Jordan is a home to 2,175,491 registered Palestinian refugees. Out of those 2,175,491 refugees, 634,182 have not been given Jordanian citizenship. Jordan also hosts around 1.4 million Syrian refugees who fled to the country due to the Syrian Civil War since 2011. About 31,163 Yemenis and 22,700 Libyan refugees live in Jordan as of January 2015. There are thousands of Lebanese refugees who came to Jordan when civil strife and war and the 2006 war broke out in their native country. Up to 1 million Iraqis came to Jordan following the Iraq War in 2003. In 2015, their number was 130,911. About 2,500 Iraqi Mandaean refugees have been resettled in Jordan.

=== Age structure ===
Structure of the population (Census 01.X.2004) (Excluding data for former Jordanian territories under Israeli control since June 1967. Excluding foreigners, including registered Palestinian refugees.)

Age group	Male	Female	Total	%
Total	2 626 287	2 477 352	5 103 639	100
0-4	333 216	317 115	650 331	12.74
5-9	329 133	313 738	642 871	12.60
10-14	313 083	297 046	610 129	11.95
15-19	287 693	272 145	559 838	10.97
20-24	279 600	260 593	540 193	10.58
25-29	239 774	216 487	456 261	8.94
30-34	207 178	191 991	399 169	7.82
35-39	167 737	155 689	323 426	6.34
40-44	123 945	117 455	241 400	4.73
45-49	87 098	83 358	170 456	3.34
50-54	64 607	63 633	128 240	2.51
55-59	55 765	57 956	113 721	2.23
60-64	52 084	46 703	98 787	1.94
65-69	37 095	34 728	71 823	1.41
70-74	23 467	23 353	46 820	0.92
75-79	12 651	11 617	24 268	0.48
80+	10 137	11 923	22 060	0.43
80-84	6 144	7 441	13 585	0.27
85-89	2 444	2 588	5 032	0.10
90-94	1 012	1 304	2 316	0.05
95-99	537	590	1 127	0.02
Age group	Male	Female	Total	Percent
0-14	975 432	927 899	1 903 331	37.29
15-64	1 565 481	1 466 010	3 031 491	59.40
65+	83 350	81 621	164 971	3.23
unknown	2 024	1 822	3 846	0.08

Structure of the population (31.12.2013) (Estimates) (Excluding data for former Jordanian territories under Israeli control since June 1967. Excluding foreigners, including registered Palestinian refugees.)

Age group	Male	Female	Total	%
Total	3 366 000	3 174 000	6 530 000	100
0-4	427 485	405 300	832 785	12.75
5-9	422 095	400 880	822 975	12.60
10-14	401 900	379 680	781 580	11.97
15-19	368 915	347 720	716 635	10.97
20-24	358 485	333 170	691 655	10.59
25-29	307 650	276 855	584 505	8.95
30-34	265 915	245 520	511 435	7.83
35-39	215 425	199 015	414 440	6.35
40-44	158 875	149 975	308 850	4.73
45-49	111 750	106 630	218 380	3.34
50-54	82 805	81 320	164 125	2,51
55-59	71 360	74 040	145 400	2.23
60-64	66 645	59 800	126 445	1.94
65-69	47 485	44 280	91 765	1.41
70-74	30 040	29 785	59 825	0.92
75-79	16 195	14 815	31 010	0.48
80-84	7 865	9 495	17 360	0.27
85-89	3 130	3 300	6 430	0.10
90-94	1 295	1 665	2 960	0.05
95+	685	755	1 440	0.02
Age group	Male	Female	Total	Percent
0-14	1 251 480	1 185 860	2 437 340	37.33
15-64	2 007 825	1 874 045	3 881 870	59.45
65+	106 695	104 095	210 790	3.23

Population by Sex and Age Group (Census 30.XI.2015) (Excluding data for former Jordanian territories under Israeli control since June 1967.):

Age group	Male	Female	Total	%
Total	5 046 824	4 484 888	9 531 712	100
0–4	561 280	532 918	1 094 198	11.48
5–9	597 975	571 516	1 169 491	12.27
10–14	519 876	490 522	1 010 398	10.60
15–19	498 519	449 302	947 821	9.94
20–24	519 140	426 835	945 975	9.92
25–29	459 841	370 765	830 606	8.71
30–34	395 939	338 461	734 400	7.70
35–39	352 691	298 499	651 190	6.83
40–44	304 330	256 601	560 931	5.88
45–49	258 567	214 842	473 409	4.97
50–54	187 189	162 648	349 837	3.67
55–59	127 359	117 340	244 699	2.57
60–64	86 254	80 824	167 078	1.75
65-69	67 492	68 161	135 653	1.42
70-74	52 668	47 124	99 792	1.05
75-79	32 428	31 759	64 187	0.67
80-84	15 324	15 633	30 957	0.32
85-89	6 387	7 351	13 738	0.14
90-94	1 797	2 238	4 035	0.04
95+	1 768	1 549	3 317	0.03
Age group	Male	Female	Total	Percent
0–14	1 679 131	1 594 956	3 274 087	34.35
15–64	3 189 829	2 716 117	5 905 946	61.96
65+	177 864	173 815	351 679	3.69

== Vital statistics ==
=== UN estimates ===
Period	Live births per year	Deaths per year	Natural change per year	CBR^{1}	CDR^{1}	NC^{1}	TFR^{1}	IMR^{1}
1950–1955	26 000	11 000	15 000	47.4	19.3	28.1	7.38	160.9
1955–1960	38 000	13 000	25 000	49.4	16.5	32.9	7.38	128.9
1960–1965	54 000	15 000	40 000	53.6	14.5	39.1	8.00	103.2
1965–1970	73 000	16 000	57 000	52.3	11.8	40.5	8.00	82.8
1970–1975	90 000	17 000	73 000	49.0	9.4	39.6	7.79	68.3
1975–1980	92 000	16 000	76 000	42.8	7.5	35.3	7.38	56.5
1980–1985	101 000	17 000	85 000	39.7	6.5	33.2	7.05	44.4
1985–1990	117 000	18 000	99 000	37.5	5.7	31.8	6.44	36.0
1990–1995	132 000	19 000	113 000	33.9	4.9	29.0	5.14	30.6
1995–2000	147 000	21 000	127 000	32.0	4.5	27.5	4.34	26.7
2000–2005	143 000	21 000	122 000	28.1	4.2	23.9	3.60	23.6
2005–2010	152 000	23 000	128 000	26.4	4.1	22.3	3.27	21.0
^{1} CBR = crude birth rate (per 1000); CDR = crude death rate (per 1000); NC = natural change (per 1000); TFR = total fertility rate (number of children per woman); IMR = infant mortality rate per 1000 births

=== Registered births and deaths ===
	Average population	Live births	Deaths	Natural change	Crude birth rate (per 1000)	Crude death rate (per 1000)	Natural change (per 1000)	Crude mirgration rate (per 1000)	Total fertility rate (TFR) (Note: In fertility rates, 2.1 and above is a stable population and have been marked blue, 2 and below leads to an aging population and a reducing population.)
1951		51,518							
1952	586,200	46,146							
1953		49,228							
1954		53,170							
1955		58,037							
1956		55,374							
1957		60,582							
1958		69,594							
1959		63,643							
1960		78,520							
1961	900,800	70,775							
1962		86,397							
1963		84,544							
1964		86,327							
1965		91,857							
1966		94,299							
1967		70,956							
1968		69,483							
1969		73,443							
1970	1,508,200	76,828							
1971		77,758							
1972		80,327							
1973		81,302							
1974		81,490							
1975		81,659							
1976		84,380							
1977		79,882							
1978		84,195							
1979	2,133,000	91,622							
1980	2,233,000								
1981	2,319,000	95,628			41.2				
1982	2,409,000	97,794			40.6				
1983	2,502,000	98,398			39.3				
1984	2,599,000	102,521			39.4				
1985	2,700,000	102,712			38.0				
1986	2,805,000	112,451			40.1				
1987	2,914,000	107,519			36.9				
1988	3,027,000	116,346			38.4				
1989	3,144,000	115,742			36.8				
1990	3,468,000	116,520			33.6				
1991	3,701,000	150,177			40.6				
1992	3,844,000	155,684			40.5				
1993	3,993,000	149,493			37.4				
1994	4,139,400	140,444			33.9				
1995	4,264,000	141,319			33.1				
1996	4,383,000	142,404			32.5				
1997	4,506,000	130,633			29.0				4.4
1998	4,623,000	133,714			28.9				
1999	4,738,000	135,266			28.5				
2000	4,857,000	126,016	13,339	112,677	25.9	2.7	23.2		
2001	4,918,000	142,956	16,164	126,792	29.1	3.3	25.8	-13.4	
2002	5,038,000	146,077	17,220	128,857	29.0	3.4	25.6	-1.8	
2003	5,164,000	148,294	16,937	131,357	28.7	3.3	25.4	-1.0	
2004	5,414,000	150,248	17,011	133,237	27.8	3.1	24.6	21.6	
2005	5,678,000	152,276	17,883	134,393	26.8	3.1	23.7	19.8	
2006	5,843,000	162,972	20,397	142,575	27.8	3.5	24.3	0.9	
2007	6,017,000	185,011	20,924	164,087	30.7	3.5	27.2	-1.0	3.6
2008	6,200,000	181,328	19,403	161,925	29.2	3.1	26.1	2.4	3.6
2009	6,392,000	179,872	20,251	159,621	28.1	3.2	24.9	3.7	3.8
2010	6,594,000	183,948	21,550	162,398	27.9	3.3	24.6	2.8	3.8
2011	6,846,000	178,435	21,730	156,705	26.1	3.2	22.9	10.8	3.8
2012	7,210,000	177,695	22,785	154,910	24.6	3.2	21.4	26.2	3.5
2013	7,771,000	178,143	23,898	154,245	22.9	3.1	19.8	49.9	3.5
2014	8,459,000	188,902	25,782	163,120	22.3	3.0	19.3	59.7	3.5
2015	9,182,000	198,018	26,640	171,378	21.6	2.9	18.7	58.7	3.38
2016	9,798,000	197,789	27,608	170,181	20.2	2.8	17.4	43.6	3.38
2017	10,053,000	211,441	27,516	183,925	21.0	2.7	18.3	5.3	3.14
2018	10,309,000	207,917	27,753	180,164	20.2	2.7	17.5	5.6	3.00
2019	10,554,000	197,287	29,836	167,451	18.7	2.8	15.9	5.8	2.90
2020	10,806,000	176,557	32,653	143,904	16.3	3.0	13.3	9.1	2.61
2021	11,057,000	187,722	38,505	149,217	17.0	3.5	13.5	8.4	2.65
2022	11,302,000	181,991	30,075	151,916	16.1	2.7	13.4	7.4	2.53
2023	11,516,000	171,980	28,419	143,561	14.9	2.5	12.4	5.3	2.37
2024	11,734,000	166,405	29,455	136,950	14.2	2.5	11.7	6.9	2.24(e)
2025	11,937,000	159,016	30,871	128,145	13.4	2.6	10.8		2.11(e)

==== Current vital statistics ====
Period	Live births	Deaths	Natural increase
January–December 2024	166,405	29,455	+136,950
January–December 2025	159,016	30,871	+128,145
Difference	▼ –7,389 (-4.4%)	▲ +1,416 (+4.8%)	▼ –8,805

=== Fertility Rate ===
Fertility Rate (The Demographic Health Survey) Fertility Rate (TFR) (Wanted Fertility Rate) and CBR (Crude Birth Rate):

Year	Total		Urban		Rural	
Year	CBR	TFR	CBR	TFR	CBR	TFR
1976		7.4				
1983		6.6				
1990	36.1	5.57 (3.94)	33.9	4.75 (3.36)	39.0	6.85 (4.76)
1997	33.1	4.35 (2.9)	32.5	4.22 (2.9)	35.5	5.00 (3.1)
2002	29.0	3.7 (2.6)	28.4	3.5 (2.5)	31.3	4.2 (2.8)
2007	28.1	3.6 (2.8)	28.1	3.6 (2.8)	28.2	3.7 (2.8)
2009	30.6	3.8 (3.0)	30.6	3.8 (2.9)	30.7	4.0 (3.1)
2012	27.2	3.5 (2.4)	26.7	3.4 (2.4)	29.8	3.9 (2.7)
2017-18	21.6	2.7 (2.2)	21.3	2.7 (2.1)	23.7	3.1 (2.4)
2023	18.9	2.6 (1.9)	18.8	2.6 (1.9)	19.6	2.8 (2.0)

Fertility Rate (TFR) (Wanted Fertility Rate) by nationality

Year	Jordanian	Syrian	Other nationality
2017-2018	2.6 (2.1)	4.7 (3.7)	1.9 (1.7)

Year	Jordanian	Syrian outside camps/inside camps/Total	Other nationality
2023	2.5 (1.8)	3.9 (2.8)/4.9 (3.6)/4.1 (2.9)	2.1 (1.7)

As of 2023, the total fertility rate was between 2.9-3.1 in the northern governorates of Irbid, Ajloun, Jarash, Mafraq, and Zarqa; and between 1.9-2.4 in all other governorates.

Years	1925	1926	1927	1928	1929	1930	1931	1932	1933	1934
Total Fertility Rate in Jordan	6.97	6.99	7.02	7.04	7.06	7.09	7.11	7.14	7.16	7.18

Years	1935	1936	1937	1938	1939	1940	1941	1942	1943	1944
Total Fertility Rate in Jordan	7.21	7.23	7.25	7.28	7.30	7.33	7.35	7.37	7.40	7.42

Years	1945	1946	1947	1948	1949
Total Fertility Rate in Jordan	7.45	7.47	7.49	7.52	7.54

=== Life expectancy ===
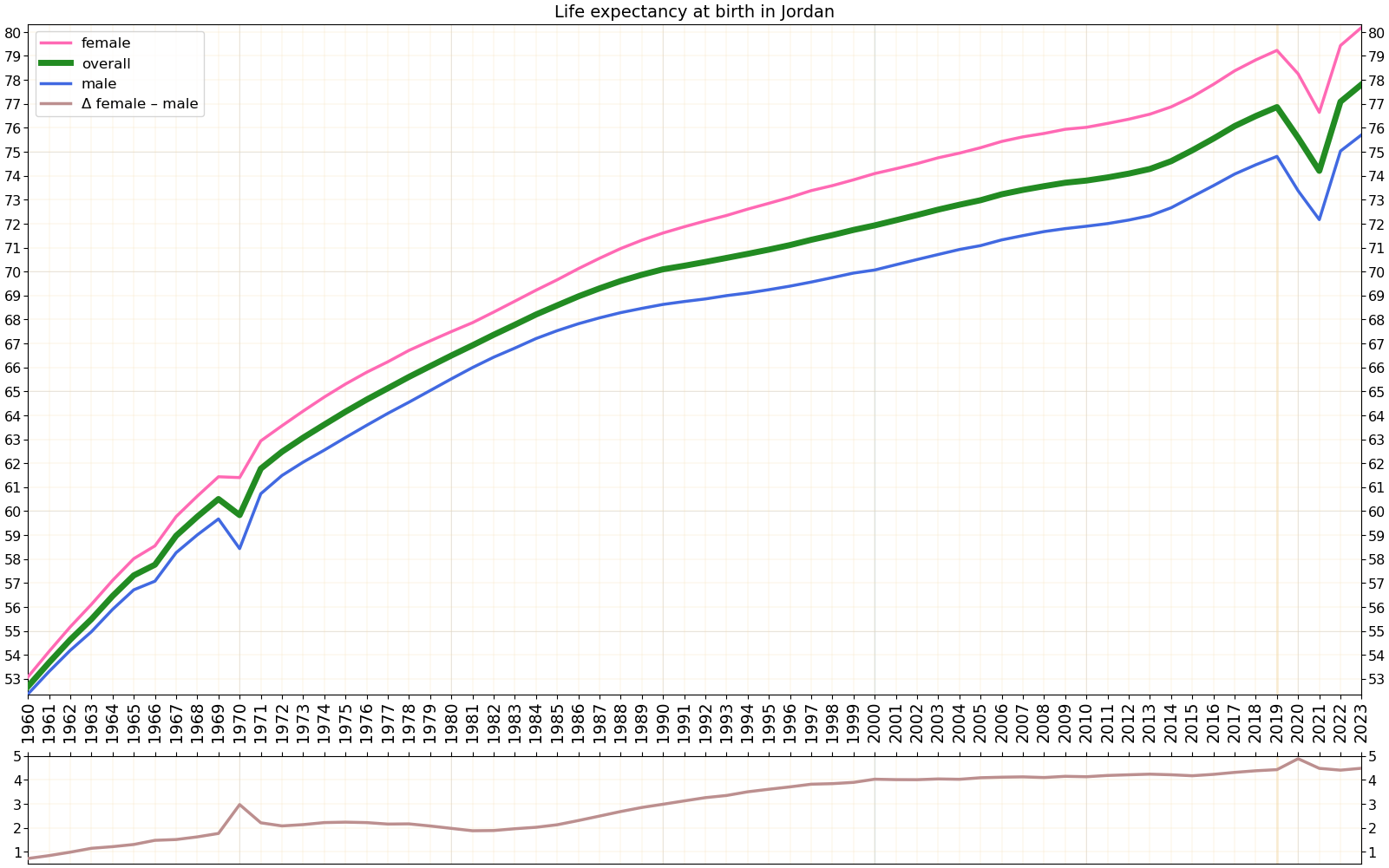
Life expectancy at birth in Jordan

Period	Life expectancy in Years	Period	Life expectancy in Years
1950–1955	46.5	1985–1990	69.2
1955–1960	50.7	1990–1995	70.4
1960–1965	54.6	1995–2000	71.3
1965–1970	58.4	2000–2005	72.2
1970–1975	61.9	2005–2010	73.0
1975–1980	64.9	2010–2015	73.8
1980–1985	67.2		

Source: UN World Population Prospects

== Ethnic and religious groups ==
Ethnic groups in Jordan
Ethnic groups
Arabs	95%
Circassian, Chechens	3%
Armenian and others	2%

=== Arab ===
Arab Jordanians are either descended from families and clans who were living in the cities and towns in Transjordan prior to Jordanian independence in 1946, most notably in the governorates of Jerash, Ajlun, Balqa, Irbid, Madaba, Al Karak, Aqaba, Amman and some other towns in the country, or from the Palestinian families who settled in Jordan in different times in the 20th century, mostly during and after the wars of 1948 and 1967. Many Christians are natives especially in towns such as Fuhies, Madaba, Al Karak, Ajlun, or have Bedouin origins, and a significant number came in 1948 and 1967 mainly from Jerusalem, Jaffa, Lydda, Bethlehem, and other Palestinian cities.

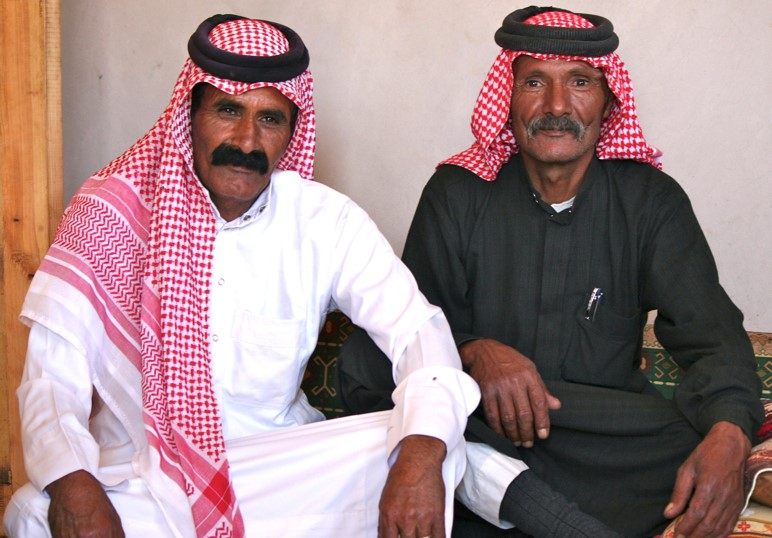
Bedouin Arab men from Jordan

==== Druze ====
The Druze people are believed to constitute about 0.5% of the total population of Jordan, around 32,000 people. The Druze, who refer to themselves as al-Muwahhideen, or "believers in one God," are concentrated in the rural, mountainous areas west and north of Amman. Even though the faith originally developed out of Ismaili Islam, most Druze do not identify as Muslims, and they do not accept the five pillars of Islam.

==== Bedouin Arabs ====
The other group of Jordanians is descended from Bedouins, of which less than 1% live a nomadic lifestyle. Bedouin settlements are concentrated in the south and east of the country.

=== Afro-Jordanians ===
An unknown but considerable number of Jordanians are of African descent.

=== Armenians ===
There were an estimated 5,000 Armenians living within the country in 2009. An estimated 4,500 of these are members of the Armenian Apostolic Church, and predominantly speak the Western dialect of the Armenian language. This population makes up the majority of non-Arab Christians in the country.

=== Assyrians ===
There is an Assyrian refugee population in Jordan. Many Assyrians have arrived in Jordan as refugees since the invasion of Iraq, making up a large part of the Iraqi refugees.

=== Turks ===
There are people of Turkish ancestry living in Jordan. These people have had a thriving presence in Jordan since the rule of the Ottoman Empire. Today, there is a minority of about 60,000 people in the country who are the descendants of the Ottoman-Turkish immigrants. As of 2009, there are also 8,262 Turkish citizens who are recent migrants to Jordan.

=== Circassians ===
By the end of the 19th century, the Ottoman Authorities directed the Circassian immigrants to settle in Jordan. The Circassians are Sunni Muslims and are estimated to number 100,000 to 170,000 people.

=== Chechens ===
There are about 10,000 Chechens estimated to reside in Jordan.

=== Doms ===
There are 70,000 Dom people in Jordan.

=== Genetics ===
Bahri et al. (2011) observed that the Jordanians have a genetic profile that is Arabian Semitic, despite the succession of several civilizations in Jordan. They have a common origin in Mesopotamia and are not too genetically dissimilar from the peoples of the United Arab Emirates and North Africa, who respectively have a common origin in Arabia and North Africa.

Zanetti et al. (2014) discovered significant genetic differentiation between general Jordanians and Bedouin Arabs. General Jordanians were more similar to other Middle Eastern populations whilst Bedouin Arabs were more similar to North Africans. However, the Bedouin Arabs played a significant role in the "peopling" of Jordan, both in the past and present.

== Religion ==
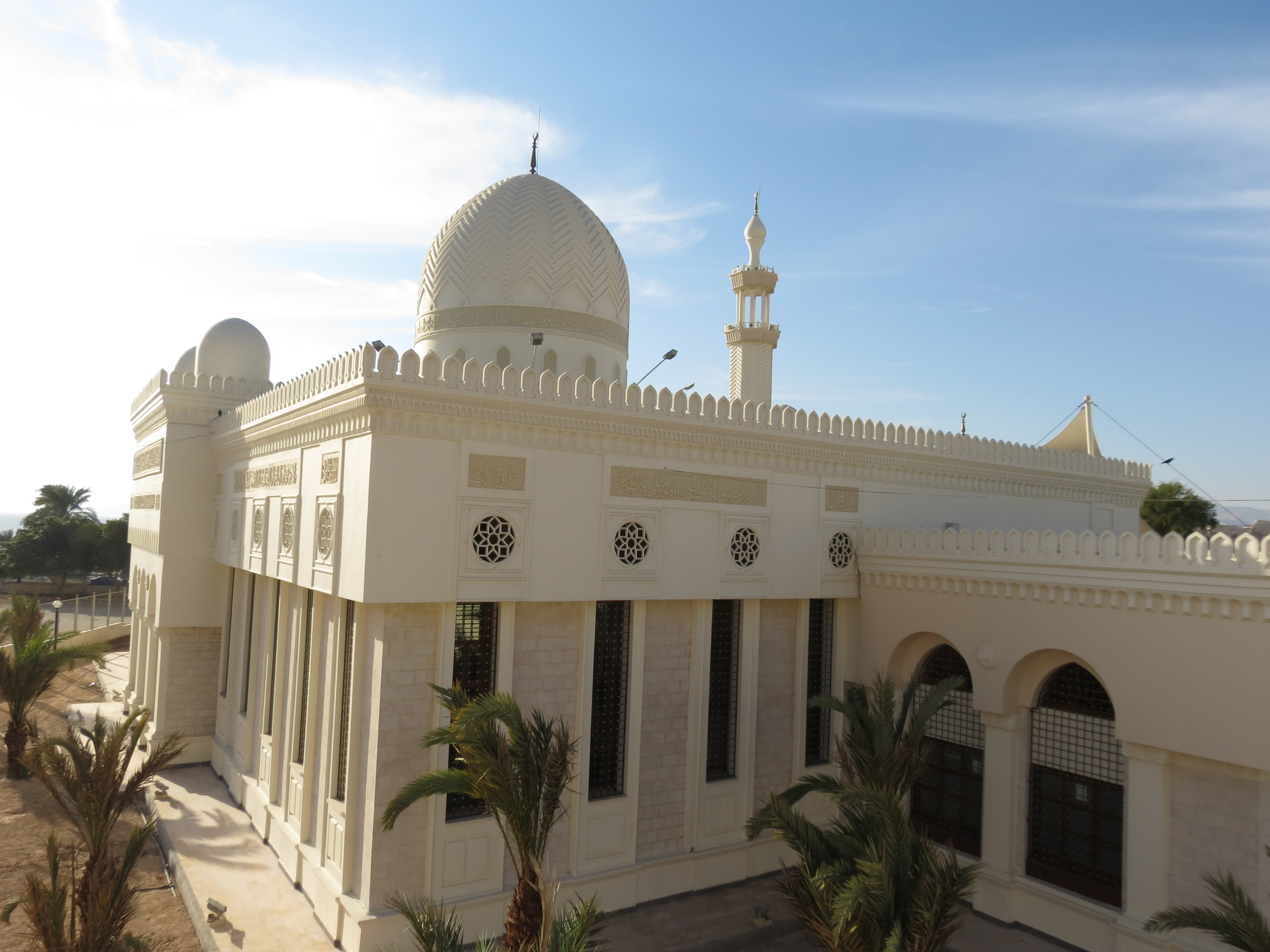
Marsa Zayed mosque in Aqaba.

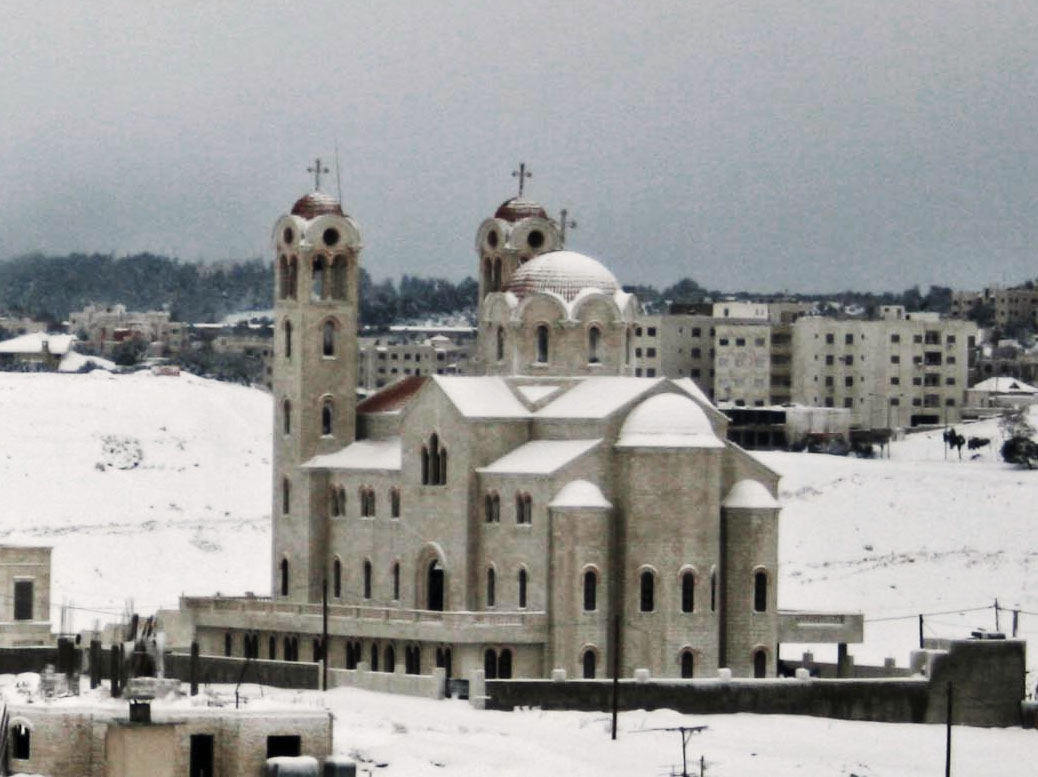
An eastern Orthodox church during a snowstorm in Amman.

Religion in Jordan
1. Islam (97.0%)
2. Christianity (2.50%)
3. Other (0.50%)

== Health and education ==
Jordan prides itself on its health services, which is considered some of the best in the region. Qualified medics, favourable investment climate and Jordan's stability have contributed to the success of this sector.

Jordan has a very advanced education system. The school education system comprises 2 years of pre-school education, 10 years of compulsory basic education, and two years of secondary academic or vocational education, after which the students sit for the General Certificate of Secondary Education Exam (Tawjihi). Scholars may attend either private or public schools.

Access to higher education is open to holders of the General Secondary Education Certificate, who can then choose between private Community Colleges, public Community Colleges or universities (public and private). The credit-hour system, which entitles students to select courses according to a study plan, is implemented at universities. The number of public universities has reached (10), besides (17) universities that are private, and (51) community colleges. Numbers of universities accompanied by significant increase in number of students enrolled to study in these universities, where the number of enrolled students in both public and private universities is estimated at nearly (236) thousand; (28) thousand out of the total are from Arab or foreign nationalities.

== See also ==
- Demographics of the Arab World
- Minorities in Jordan
- Demographics of the Middle East
- List of cities in Jordan

== Bibliography ==
- Gandolfo, Luisa (24 December 2012). Palestinians in Jordan: The Politics of Identity. I. B. Tauris. ISBN 978-1-78076-095-7.
