= Anzor Nafash =

Jordanian football player and coach

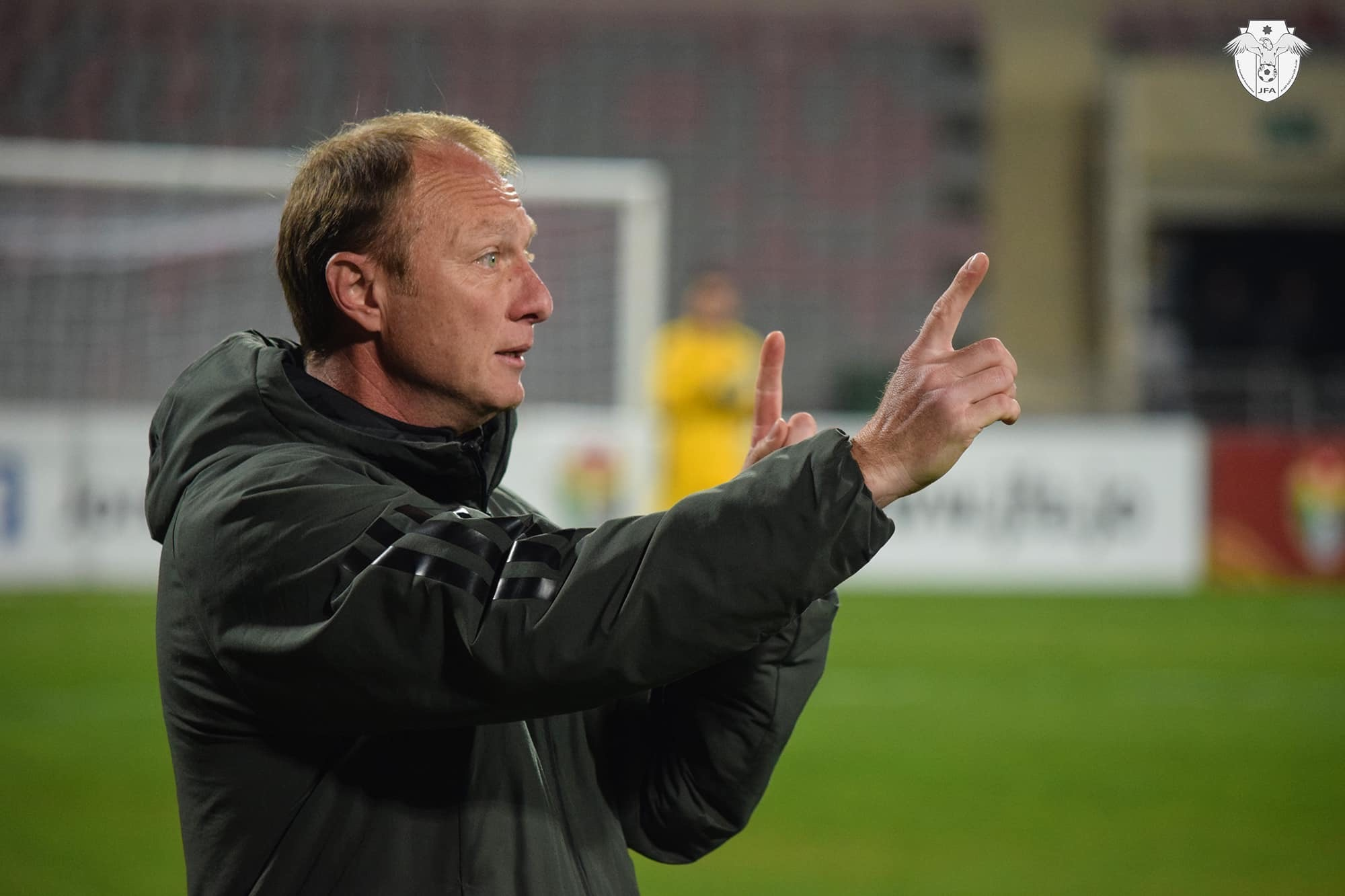
- Nafash as Al-Ahli manager in 2020

Personal information
- Full name: Anzor Nadim Rashad Nafash
- Date of birth: 2 November 1978 (age 47)
- Place of birth: Nalchik, Russian SFSR, Soviet Union
- Height: 1.81 m (5 ft 11 in)
- Position: Midfielder

Youth career
- 1996–1997: Spartak-2 Nalchik

Senior career*
Years	Team	Apps	(Gls)
1997–1998	Spartak Nalchik	13	(0)
1998	FC Nart Nartkala	19	(1)
1999	Kavkazkabel Prokhladny	14	(0)
1999–2002	Al-Ahli (Amman)	53	(7)
2002–2003	Sutjeska Nikšić	23	(1)
2003–2005	Al-Ahli (Amman)		(1)
2005–2006	Kavkaztransgaz-2005 Ryzdvyany	30	(5)
2007	SKA Rostov-on-Don	33	(2)
2008	Lukhovitsy	30	(13)
2009	Avangard Kursk	30	(6)
2010–2011	Gubkin	33	(2)
2011–2012	Kavkaztransgaz-2005 Ryzdvyany	34	(4)
Total		369+	(57+)

International career
2000–2004	Jordan	10	(0)

Managerial career
- 2020: Al-Ahli Club (Amman)
- * Club domestic league appearances and goals

Anzor Nadim Rashad Nafash (Arabic: أنزور نديم رشاد نفش; born 2 November 1978) is a professional football coach and former player who played as a midfielder.

Born in the Russian SFSR to a Russian father and a Jordanian mother, Nafash became a Jordanian citizen through naturalization. Between 2002 and 2003, he appeared in four matches for the Jordan national team.

== Early life ==
Nafash was born in the Russian SFSR, Soviet Union to a Russian father and a Jordanian mother. He obtained Jordanian citizenship in order to represent the Jordan national team.

== Managerial career ==
On 16 January 2020, Nafash was appointed head coach of Al-Ahli.
