= Doqara SC =

Jordanian association football club based in Irbid

Doqara
- Full name: Doqara Sport Club
- Founded: 1990
- Ground: Prince Hashim Stadium
- Capacity: 5,000
- Chairman: Mohammad Al-Shaloul
- Manager: Ahmed Abdel-Qader
- League: Jordanian Pro League
- 2025: Jordanian First Division League, 2nd of 14 (promoted)
- Website: Official page

Doqara Sport Club (Arabic: نادي دوقرة الرياضي) is a Jordanian football club based in Duwaqarah, Irbid Governorate, Jordan. It currently competes at the Jordanian Pro League, the first tier of Jordanian football.

They host a variety of sports. In addition to football, they have a handball team, a kickboxing team, as well as a women's team.

== History ==
The social and cultural club was founded in 1990, where it serves various cultural activities throughout the year, as well as sports activities for the Duwaqarah community.

In early 2007, Club President Mohammad Al-Shaloul was reported to have waited 5 years for financial support from the Crown, to which they never received back.

On 14 August 2022, Doqara gained promotion to the 2023 Jordanian Second Division League from the 2022 Jordanian Third Division League, after beating Kufranjah 1-0 in a quarter-final matchup.

On 30 August 2023, Doqara beat Balama in the 2023–24 Jordan FA Cup 4–1 in the preliminary round.

Doqara had what was initially seen as a successful 2023 Jordanian Second Division League season, as a team that was immediately promoted from the Third Division League. They had beaten Jerash 1–0 on aggregate, to advance to the final of the competition, meaning that Doqara was meant to participate in the Jordanian First Division League for the upcoming season, which was seen as a dream for the club.

However, on 18 December 2023, Jerash filed a complaint to the Jordan Football Association's Disciplinary Committee, due to alleged foul play on Doqara's end throughout the two-legged affair. The hearings from both clubs lasted for months, to which eventually on 4 June 2024, the JFA ruled in favour of Jerash, and gave harsh penalties to Doqara, including demoting them back to the Jordanian Third Division League, as well as promote Jerash to the 2024 Jordanian First Division League in their place. Doqara eventually went on to beat Al-Karmel 5–1 at Al-Hassan Stadium in the final, to win the league that season.

Other major penalties include Doqara being stripped of their most recent league trophy. Club President Mohamed Al-Shaloul was deprived from participating in any football-related activity for two years and fining him an amount of (10,000) dinars, as well as fine Doqara an amount of (15,000) dinars and withhold any participation revenues Doqara would have gotten from their past season.

Doqara appealed the ruling from the Jordan Football Association's Disciplinary Committee, to which the JFA's Appeals Committee decided to "rescind the decision issued by the Disciplinary Committee to relegate Doqara to the Jordanian Third Division League in light of audio recordings of a complaint filed by Jerash".

On 27 December 2024, the Jordan Football Association reversed their decision on Doqara to relegate them, as well as allow them to participate in the 2024 Jordanian First Division League. It defeated Sahab 15–1. They subsequently finished 8th of 14th that season. After much uncertainty about the statuses of Doqara and Jerash, on 8 March, the Court of Arbitration for Sport (CAS) accepted Doqara's appeal against the JFA, allowing them to remain in the First Division League and relegating Jerash, who were later reinstated by the JFA for the following season. The CAS deemed that the JFA "failed to prove the charge of manipulating the results of the matches according to the approved standard of proof". President Mohammad Al-Shaloul subsequently made a personal case against the JFA, demanding the federation to compensate him of up to a million Jordanian dinars, due to defamation and the moral damages that affected both him and his club.

For the following season Doqara set their goals to getting promoted to the Jordanian Pro League by hiring Imad Rashad as manager. However, on 20 August, Doqara hired Khaled Al-Daboubi as manager of the club, after Rashad left by mutual consent. By 3 December, Doqara achieved the historic promotion to the Pro League, after defeating Ma'an 1-0. It would go on to finish as runners-up of the competition.

== Current squad ==
As of 2 September 2026

Note: Flags indicate national team as defined under FIFA eligibility rules; some limited exceptions apply. Players may hold more than one non-FIFA nationality.

No.	Pos.	Nation	Player
1	GK	JOR	Ahmad Sghair
2	DF	JOR	Omar Al-Khatib (on loan from Etihad)
3	DF	JOR	Adnan Nofal (on loan from Al-Faisaly)
5	DF	JOR	Abdallah Al-Manasrah
6	MF	JOR	Ahmad Tannous
7	MF	JOR	Mohammad Al-Khaldi
8	MF	JOR	Saeed Murjan (captain)
9	FW	BRA	Breno Teixeira
10	MF	JOR	Hamza Al-Saifi
11	FW	JOR	Suhaib Abu Hashhash
12	GK	JOR	Asil Al-Sayaheen
13	MF	JOR	Mohammad Jamal Issa
14	DF	JOR	Bassam Daldoom
15	DF	JOR	Laith Abu Rahal (on loan from Al-Faisaly)
16	FW	JOR	Faris Ghatasha
17	FW	MTN	Mahmoud El Hacen
18	DF	JOR	Ahed Shahadat (on loan from Etihad)
20	MF	BRA	Mateus Amaral

No.	Pos.	Nation	Player
21	DF	JOR	Ward Al-Barri (vice-captain)
22	GK	JOR	Ahmad Malkawi
23	MF	JOR	Mahmoud Al-Bashtawi
24	DF	PLE	Ahmed Qatmish
27	DF	JOR	Omar Qandeel
29	MF	SEN	Muhammed Diame Pape
30	MF	JOR	Murad Al-Qadoumi
70	MF	JOR	Abdulrahman Marie
99	MF	JOR	Mohammad Bani Attieh
—	DF	JOR	Hamza Al-Draisa
—	DF	JOR	Ahmad Kharashgah
—	MF	JOR	Mohamad Hani (on loan from Al-Faisaly)
—	MF	JOR	Ahmad Weidan
—	FW	JOR	Mohamed Hussein Musalm
—	FW	JOR	Hashim Al-Khaldi
—	FW	JOR	Ahmad Fahmy Weidan
—	FW	JOR	Laith Thinat

== Personnel ==
=== Technical staff ===
As of 30 August 2026

Technical staff
(Jordan) Ahmed Abdel-Qader	Head coach
(Jordan) Hassan Abdel-Fattah (Jordan) Fahd Al-Jalad (Jordan) Mohammad Malkawi	Assistant coach
(Jordan) Waleed Mikhail	Goalkeeping coach
(Jordan) Wael Obaidallah	Fitness coach
(Jordan) Mohammad Bani Atta	Performance analyst

=== Administrative staff ===
Administrative staff
(Jordan) Mr. Mohammad Ghazi Al-Shaloul Abu Adwan	Club president
(Jordan) Salem Al-Shaloul	Team manager
(Jordan) Abdullah Al-Shaloul	Administrator
(Jordan) Nasr Al-Shaloul	Director of medical staff

=== Managerial history ===
- (Jordan) Imad Rashad (2025)
- (Jordan) Khaled Al-Daboubi (2025)
- (Jordan) Ahmed Abdel-Qader (2026–)

== Notable players ==
The following players have either played at the professional or international level, either before, during or after playing for Doqara Club:

- (Jordan) Saeed Murjan
- (Jordan) Rakan Al-Khalidi
