= 2026–27 Pyramids FC season =

Pyramids FC
2026–27 season
- Chairman: Mahmoud Eid
- Manager: Rulani Mokwena
- Stadium: 30 June Stadium
- Egyptian Premier League: 1st
- Egypt Cup: Round of 16
- Egyptian League Cup: Group stages
- Egyptian Super Cup: Semi-finals
- CAF Champions League: Group stages
- All statistics correct as of 19 November 2026.

The 2026–27 season the ninth season in the history of Pyramids FC and the ninth consecutive season in the top flight of Egyptian football. In addition to the Egyptian Premier League, the club is competing in the Egypt Cup, the Egyptian League Cup (branded the Egypt Capital Cup) and the CAF Champions League.

Pyramids qualified for the Champions League by finishing runners-up in the 2025–26 league season, and entered the campaign as holders of the Egypt Cup after beating ZED FC 2–1 in the 2026 final. It is the first season under South African head coach Rulani Mokwena, who replaced Krunoslav Jurčić at the end of the previous season.

== Players ==
=== First-team squad ===
Squad for the 2026–27 season as announced on 18 August 2026.

Note: Flags indicate national team as defined under FIFA eligibility rules; some limited exceptions apply. Players may hold more than one non-FIFA nationality.

No.	Pos.	Nation	Player
1	GK	EGY	Ahmed El Shenawy
3	DF	EGY	Mahmoud Marei
4	DF	EGY	Ahmed Samy
5	DF	EGY	Ali Gabr (captain)
6	DF	EGY	Osama Galal
7	MF	EGY	Youssef Obama
8	MF	EGY	Mahmoud Saber
9	FW	EGY	Ahmed Kader
11	FW	EGY	Mostafa Fathi
12	DF	EGY	Ahmed Tawfik
13	FW	ALG	Nadhir Benbouali
14	MF	EGY	Mohanad Lasheen
15	DF	MAR	Mohamed Chibi
17	MF	EGY	Zalaka
18	MF	MAR	Walid El Karti
20	FW	EGY	Abdel Rahman Magdy

No.	Pos.	Nation	Player
21	DF	EGY	Mohamed Hamdy
23	MF	EGY	Otta
25	FW	JOR	Odeh Al-Fakhouri
26	FW	EGY	Mohamed El Gabbas
27	MF	EGY	Nasser Maher
28	GK	EGY	Mahmoud Gad
29	DF	EGY	Karim Hafez
30	FW	EGY	Mostafa Ziko
31	GK	EGY	Hazem Gamal
32	MF	BRA	Ewerton
34	DF	EGY	Eyad El Askalany (on loan from Rostov)
35	MF	EGY	Ahmed Fawzi
37	MF	EGY	Hassan Tarek
38	FW	EGY	Ali Hamouda
39	FW	EGY	Mesho
40	MF	EGY	Ziad Saoudi

== Transfers ==
=== In ===
Date	Pos.	Player	From	Fee	Ref.
16 July 2026	RB	(Egypt) Khaled Awad	(Egypt) Tala'ea El Gaish	EGP 30 million	
28 July 2026	LB	(Egypt) Eyad El Askalany	(Russia) Rostov	Loan	
Summer 2026	GK	(Egypt) Hazem Gamal	(Egypt) Al Ahly	Free	
12 August 2026	AM	(Egypt) Ahmed Abdel Kader	(Iraq) Al-Karma	Undisclosed	
14 August 2026	FW	(Algeria) Ahmed Nadhir Benbouali	(Hungary) Győri ETO FC	€2.9 million	

The Egyptian transfer window closed on 15 August 2026.

=== Out ===
Date	Pos.	Player	To	Fee	Ref.
Summer 2026	FW	(Democratic Republic of the Congo) Fiston Mayele	(Libya) Al Ahly Benghazi	Contract expired	
30 June 2026	GK	(Egypt) Sherif Ekramy	—	Retired	
30 June 2026	RB	(Egypt) Tarek Alaa	(Egypt) ZED FC	Reported €173,000	
30 June 2026	GK	(Egypt) Ahmed Mayhoub	(Egypt) Smouha	Reported €87,000	
8 August 2026	FW	(Egypt) Marwan Hamdi	(Iraq) Al-Karma	Undisclosed	
13 August 2026	DF	(Tanzania) Pascal Phiri	(Egypt) Al Ittihad	Loan	
14 August 2026	FW	(Egypt) Abdo Gouda	(Egypt) ZED FC	Loan	

== Pre-season and friendlies ==
Pyramids held an 18-day training camp in Erzurum, Turkey, from 23 July to 9 August 2026, under new head coach Rulani Mokwena. Karim Hafez, Mohanad Lasheen and Mostafa Ziko joined later after playing for Egypt at the 2026 FIFA World Cup, where Egypt reached the round of 16. After returning to Cairo, the team played two further friendlies at Air Defense Stadium.

26 July 2026	Pyramids	0–1	Persepolis	Erzurum, Turkey
				Stadium: Erzurum

29 July 2026	Pyramids	2–0	Alanyaspor	Erzurum, Turkey
				Stadium: Erzurum

4 August 2026	Pyramids	3–1	Al-Arabi	Turkey

8 August 2026	Pyramids	1–2	Rizespor	Turkey

12 August 2026	Pyramids	6–0	Modern Dubai	Cairo
				Stadium: Air Defense Stadium

16 August 2026	Pyramids	2–1	Enppi	Cairo
				Stadium: Air Defense Stadium

== Competitions ==
=== Overview ===
Record in all competitions as of 7 November 2026.

Competition	Started	Current / final position	P	W	D	L	GF	GA	GD
Egyptian Premier League	22 August 2026	1st	8	8	0	0	19	4	+15
Egypt Cup	Round of 32	Round of 32 won	1	1	0	0	2	0	+2
Egyptian League Cup	Group stage	Group 2	2	2	0	0	4	2	+2
CAF Champions League	First preliminary round	Group stage (Group D)	4	4	0	0	12	1	+11
Total			15	15	0	0	37	7	+30

=== Egyptian Premier League ===
Pyramids opened the league campaign on 22 August 2026 away to Ghazl El Mahalla and won their first eight matches, leading the table on 24 points, four ahead of Al Ahly, as of 7 November.

22 August 2026 1	Ghazl El Mahalla	0–3	Pyramids

27 August 2026 2	Pyramids	2–0	Abu Qir Fertilizers	Cairo
				Stadium: 30 June Stadium

31 August 2026 3	Al Masry	0–1	Pyramids

9 September 2026 4	Pyramids	1–0	El Gouna	Cairo
				Stadium: 30 June Stadium

17 September 2026 5	Sharkia ENPPI	1–2	Pyramids

12 October 2026 6	Pyramids	4–1	Ceramica Cleopatra	Cairo
				Stadium: 30 June Stadium

20 October 2026 7	Tala'ea El Gaish	1–4	Pyramids

29 October 2026 8	Pyramids	2–1	Wadi Degla	Cairo
				Stadium: 30 June Stadium

23 November 2026 9	Al Ahly	–	Pyramids
7:00 PM

9 December 2026 10	Suez Petrojet	–	Pyramids
4:00 PM

14 December 2026 11	Pyramids	–	Bank El Ahly
7:00 PM

23 December 2026 12	Smouha	–	Pyramids
7:00 PM

28 December 2026 13	Pyramids	–	Zamalek
7:00 PM

4 January 2027 14	Pyramids	–	El Mokawloon
4:00 PM

27 January 2027 15	El Qanah	–	Pyramids
7:00 PM

31 January 2027 16	Pyramids	–	Ittihad Alex
7:00 PM

4 February 2027 17	Modern Sport	–	Pyramids
7:00 PM

10 February 2027 18	Pyramids	–	Petrol Asyut
8:30 PM

18 February 2027 19	Zed FC	–	Pyramids
8:30 PM

=== Egypt Cup ===
Pyramids enter as defending champions.

7 November 2026 Round of 32	Pyramids	2–0	El Dakhleya	Cairo
20:00 UTC+2	Y. Obama 8'; M. Fathy 75'			Stadium: Petrosport Stadium; Referee: Ahmed El Ghandour (Egypt)

10 January 2027 Round of 16	Pyramids	v	National Bank	Cairo
17:00 UTC+2

=== Egyptian League Cup (Egypt Capital Cup) ===
Pyramids were drawn in Group 2 with Smouha, National Bank, Modern Sport and Olympic El Qanah.

Group B

Pos	Team	Pld	W	D	L	GF	GA	GD	Pts	Qualification
1	Pyramids	2	2	0	0	4	2	+2	6	Advance to the quarter-finals
2	Modern Sport	2	1	0	1	2	1	+1	3	Advance to the quarter-finals
3	Olympic El Qanah	2	1	0	1	3	3	0	3	
4	Smouha	1	0	0	1	0	1	−1	0	
5	National Bank	1	0	0	1	0	2	−2	0	

Updated to match(es) played on 15 November 2026. Source: EFL
Rules for classification: Group stage tiebreakers

7 October 2026 Group stage, round 1	Pyramids	3–2	El Qanah	Cairo
				Stadium: Air Defense Stadium

3 November 2026 Group stage, round 2	Smouha	0–1	Pyramids	Borg El Arab
				Stadium: Army Stadium

=== CAF Champions League ===
Pyramids, the 2024–25 champions, entered at the first preliminary round.

==== Preliminary rounds ====
6 September 2026 First preliminary round, first leg	(Kenya) Gor Mahia	0–2	Pyramids	Nairobi
				Stadium: Nyayo National Stadium

13 September 2026 First preliminary round, second leg	Pyramids	5–1 (7–1 agg.)	(Kenya) Gor Mahia	Cairo
				Stadium: 30 June Stadium

16 October 2026 Second preliminary round, first leg	(South Sudan) El Merriekh Bentiu	0–1	Pyramids	Juba
				Stadium: Juba Stadium

24 October 2026 Second preliminary round, second leg	Pyramids	4–0 (5–0 agg.)	(South Sudan) El Merriekh Bentiu	Cairo
				Stadium: Air Defense Stadium

==== Group stage ====
The draw for the group stage was held on 28 October 2026.

Group D

Pos	Team	Pld	W	D	L	GF	GA	GD	Pts	Qualification	PYR	HIL	HAC	MAS
1	(Egypt) Pyramids	0	0	0	0	0	0	0	0	Advance to knockout stage	—	18–20 Dec	22–24 Jan	28 Nov
2	(Sudan) Al Hilal	0	0	0	0	0	0	0	0	Advance to knockout stage	8–10 Jan	—	29 Nov	22–24 Jan
3	(Guinea) Horoya AC	0	0	0	0	0	0	0	0		6 Dec	15–17 Jan	—	8–10 Jan
4	(Morocco) Maghreb Fez	0	0	0	0	0	0	0	0		15–17 Jan	5 Dec	18–20 Dec	—

First match(es) will be played: 28 November 2026. Source: CAF
