= 2026–27 CAF Champions League qualifying rounds =

- Dates: 4 September – 25 October 2026

Tournament statistics
- Matches played: 90
- Goals scored: 191 (2.12 per match)
- All statistics correct as of 25 October 2026.

The 2026–27 CAF Champions League qualifying rounds began on 4 September and ended on 25 October 2026. 61 teams competed in the qualifying rounds to decide the 16 places in the group stage of the 2026–27 CAF Champions League.

All times are local.

== Draw ==
The draw for the qualifying rounds was held on 6 August 2026, 12:00 GMT (15:00 local time, UTC+3), at the CAF headquarters in Cairo, Egypt.

With 61 clubs registered to take part in the qualifying rounds, three clubs have received byes to the second round. The remaining sides have been placed in Pots depending on their CAF 5-year ranking and were drawn taking into account several factors, including geographical location.

Entry round	Second round (3 teams)	First round (58 teams)	
Teams	(South Africa) Mamelodi Sundowns (73 pts); (Tunisia) Espérance de Tunis (58 pts); (Morocco) RS Berkane (57 pts)		
Teams	(South Africa) Mamelodi Sundowns (73 pts); (Tunisia) Espérance de Tunis (58 pts); (Morocco) RS Berkane (57 pts)	Pot 1 (14 teams)	Pot 2 (11 teams)
Teams	(South Africa) Mamelodi Sundowns (73 pts); (Tunisia) Espérance de Tunis (58 pts); (Morocco) RS Berkane (57 pts)	(Angola) Wiliete; (Botswana) Gaborone United; (Comoros) Fomboni; (Equatorial Guinea) 15 de Agosto; (Eswatini) Nsingizini Hotspurs; (Gabon) AS Mangasport; (Lesotho) Lijabatho FC; (Madagascar) CFFA; (Malawi) Mighty Wanderers; (Mauritius) La Cure Waves; (Mozambique) UD Songo; (Namibia) African Stars; (Seychelles) Foresters; (Zimbabwe) Scottland	(Burundi) Aigle Noir; (Chad) Aiglons; (Democratic Republic of the Congo) Aigles du Congo; (Djibouti) AS Port; (Ethiopia) Sidama; (Kenya) Gor Mahia; (Libya) Asswehly; (Rwanda) APR; (Somalia) Heegan; (South Sudan) El Merriekh Bentiu; (Zanzibar) KVZ FC
Teams	(South Africa) Mamelodi Sundowns (73 pts); (Tunisia) Espérance de Tunis (58 pts); (Morocco) RS Berkane (57 pts)	Pot 3 (11 teams)	Pot 4 (6 teams)
Teams	(South Africa) Mamelodi Sundowns (73 pts); (Tunisia) Espérance de Tunis (58 pts); (Morocco) RS Berkane (57 pts)	(Benin) Sobemap; (Burkina Faso) Rahimo; (Cameroon) Colombe Sportive; (Guinea-Bissau) Canchungo; (Morocco) Maghreb Fez; (Niger) ASN Nigelec; (Nigeria) Rangers; (Senegal) Teungueth; (Sierra Leone) Star Sport Academy; (The Gambia) Medina United; (Togo) ASC Kara	(Sudan) Al Merrikh (3 pts); (Ghana) Medeama (3 pts); (Uganda) Vipers (2 pts); (Tunisia) Club Africain (3 pts); (Ivory Coast) San Pédro (2.5 pts); (Algeria) JS Saoura (1 pt)
Teams	(South Africa) Mamelodi Sundowns (73 pts); (Tunisia) Espérance de Tunis (58 pts); (Morocco) RS Berkane (57 pts)	Pot 5 (6 teams)	Highest ranked teams (10 teams)
Teams	(South Africa) Mamelodi Sundowns (73 pts); (Tunisia) Espérance de Tunis (58 pts); (Morocco) RS Berkane (57 pts)	(Democratic Republic of the Congo) TP Mazembe (20 pts); (Nigeria) Rivers United (15 pts); (Zambia) Power Dynamos (10 pts); (Mali) Djoliba (9 pts); (Mauritania) Nouadhibou (6 pts); (Guinea) Horoya (5 pts)	(Egypt) Pyramids (49 pts); (Egypt) Zamalek (48 pts); (Sudan) Al Hilal (39 pts); (Tanzania) Simba (38 pts); (Tanzania) Young Africans (35 pts); (Angola) Petro de Luanda (27 pts); (Ivory Coast) ASEC Mimosas (24 pts); (Mali) Stade Malien (23 pts); (Algeria) MC Alger (22 pts); (South Africa) Orlando Pirates (20 pts)

== Format ==
In the qualifying rounds, each tie will be played on a home-and-away two-legged basis. If the aggregate score will be tied after the second leg, the away goals rule will be applied, and if still tied, extra time will not be played, and a penalty shoot-out will be used to determine the winner (Regulations III. 13 & 14).

== Schedule ==
The schedule of the competition will be as follows.

Schedule for the 2026–27 CAF Champions League qualifying rounds
Round	Draw date	First leg	Second leg
First round	6 August 2026	4–6 September 2026	11–13 September 2026
Second round	6 August 2026	16–18 October 2026	23–25 October 2026

== Bracket ==
The bracket of the draw was announced by the CAF on 6 August 2026. The 16 winners of the second round will advance to the group stage.

First round					Second round
1	(Angola) Wiliete	4	1	5
4	(Seychelles) Foresters	0	0	0
4	(Seychelles) Foresters	0	0	0	(Angola) Wiliete (a)	0	1	1
					(South Africa) Mamelodi Sundowns	0	1	1

First round
1	(Zimbabwe) Scottland	1	0	1
4	(Eswatini) Nsingizini Hotspurs	0	0	0
3	(Mozambique) UD Songo	0	2	2
2	(Angola) Petro de Luanda	1	2	3

Second round
(Zimbabwe) Scottland	2	0	2
(Angola) Petro de Luanda	0	3	3

First round
1	(Gabon) Mangasport	3	0	3
4	(Namibia) African Stars (a)	1	2	3
3	(Mauritius) La Cure Waves	0	1	1
2	(South Africa) Orlando Pirates	0	3	3

Second round
(Namibia) African Stars	0	0	0
(South Africa) Orlando Pirates	1	4	5

First round
1	(Equatorial Guinea) 15 de Agosto	4	1	5
4	(Comoros) Fomboni	0	0	0
3	(Malawi) Mighty Wanderers	0	1	1
2	(Tanzania) Simba	1	6	7

Second round
(Equatorial Guinea) 15 de Agosto	1	0	1
(Tanzania) Simba	6	3	9

First round
1	(Madagascar) CFFA	2	1	3
4	(Lesotho) Lijabatho	0	1	1
3	(Botswana) Gaborone United	1	1	2
2	(Tanzania) Young Africans	1	2	3

Second round
(Madagascar) CFFA	0	1	1
(Tanzania) Young Africans	4	4	8

First round					Second round
1	(Libya) Asswehly	1	3	4
4	(Zanzibar) KVZ FC	0	0	0
4	(Zanzibar) KVZ FC	0	0	0	(Libya) Asswehly	1	0	1 (1)
					(Tunisia) Espérance de Tunis (p)	0	1	1 (3)

First round
1	(Democratic Republic of the Congo) Aigles du Congo	1	0	1
4	(Rwanda) APR	0	3	3
3	(Djibouti) AS Port	1	0	1
2	(Egypt) Zamalek	2	4	6

Second round
(Rwanda) APR	0	0	0
(Egypt) Zamalek	1	1	2

First round
1	(South Sudan) El Merriekh Bentiu	1	3	4
4	(Somalia) Heegan	0	0	0
3	(Kenya) Gor Mahia	0	1	1
2	(Egypt) Pyramids	2	5	7

Second round
(South Sudan) El Merriekh Bentiu	0	0	0
(Egypt) Pyramids	1	4	5

First round
1	(Chad) Aiglons	0	0	0
4	(Ethiopia) Sidama	0	3	3
3	(Burundi) Aigle Noir	0	0	0
2	(Sudan) Al Hilal	2	1	3

Second round
(Ethiopia) Sidama	0	0	0
(Sudan) Al Hilal	2	2	4

First round					Second round
1	(Sierra Leone) Star Sport Academy (a)	0	1	1
4	(The Gambia) Medina United	0	1	1
4	(The Gambia) Medina United	0	1	1	(Sierra Leone) Star Sport Academy	0	0	0
					(Morocco) RS Berkane	2	1	3

First round
1	(Morocco) Maghreb Fez	4	0	4
4	(Burkina Faso) Rahimo	1	0	1
3	(Togo) ASC Kara	1	1	2
2	(Ivory Coast) ASEC Mimosas	1	2	3

Second round
(Morocco) Maghreb Fez	1	2	3
(Ivory Coast) ASEC Mimosas	1	1	2

First round
1	(Guinea-Bissau) Canchungo	0	0	0
4	(Senegal) Teungueth	1	1	2
3	(Cameroon) Colombe Sportive (p)	0	0	0 (4)
2	(Mali) Stade Malien	0	0	0 (3)

Second round
(Senegal) Teungueth	0	0	0
(Cameroon) Colombe Sportive	2	1	3

First round
1	(Nigeria) Rangers (p)	1	1	2 (5)
4	(Benin) Sobemap	1	1	2 (4)
3	(Niger) ASN Nigelec	0	0	0
2	(Algeria) MC Alger	0	5	5

Second round
(Nigeria) Rangers	2	0	2
(Algeria) MC Alger	0	3	3

First round
1	(Ivory Coast) San Pédro (a)	1	2	3
4	(Nigeria) Rivers United	1	2	3
3	(Uganda) Vipers	1	0	1
2	(Mauritania) Nouadhibou (a)	1	0	1

Second round
(Ivory Coast) San Pédro	2	0	2
(Mauritania) Nouadhibou	1	2	3

First round
1	(Algeria) JS Saoura	1	1	2
4	(Guinea) Horoya	0	3	3
3	(Sudan) Al Merrikh	1	1	2
2	(Zambia) Power Dynamos	0	0	0

Second round
(Guinea) Horoya (p)	1	0	1 (5)
(Sudan) Al Merrikh	0	1	1 (3)

First round
1	(Ghana) Medeama	0	1	1
4	(Democratic Republic of the Congo) TP Mazembe	1	3	4
3	(Tunisia) Club Africain	1	2	3
2	(Mali) Djoliba	0	2	2

Second round
(Democratic Republic of the Congo) TP Mazembe	1	0	1
(Tunisia) Club Africain	1	1	2

== First round ==
The first round, also called the first preliminary round, included the 58 teams that did not receive byes to the second round.

Team 1	Agg.	Team 2	1st leg	2nd leg
Wiliete (Angola)	5–0	(Seychelles) Foresters	4–0	1–0
Scottland (Zimbabwe)	1–0	(Eswatini) Nsingizini Hotspurs	1–0	0–0
UD Songo (Mozambique)	2–3	(Angola) Petro de Luanda	0–1	2–2
Mangasport (Gabon)	3–3 (a)	(Namibia) African Stars	3–1	0–2
La Cure Waves (Mauritius)	1–3	(South Africa) Orlando Pirates	0–0	1–3
15 de Agosto (Equatorial Guinea)	5–0	(Comoros) Fomboni	4–0	1–0
Mighty Wanderers (Malawi)	1–7	(Tanzania) Simba	0–1	1–6
CFFA (Madagascar)	3–1	(Lesotho) Lijabatho	2–0	1–1
Gaborone United (Botswana)	2–3	(Tanzania) Young Africans	1–1	1–2
Asswehly (Libya)	4–0	(Zanzibar) KVZ FC	1–0	3–0
Aigles du Congo (Democratic Republic of the Congo)	1–3	(Rwanda) APR	1–0	0–3
AS Port (Djibouti)	1–6	(Egypt) Zamalek	1–2	0–4
El Merriekh Bentiu (South Sudan)	4–0	(Somalia) Heegan	1–0	3–0
Gor Mahia (Kenya)	1–7	(Egypt) Pyramids	0–2	1–5
Aiglons (Chad)	0–3	(Ethiopia) Sidama	0–0	0–3
Aigle Noir (Burundi)	0–3	(Sudan) Al Hilal	0–2	0–1
Star Sport Academy (Sierra Leone)	1–1 (a)	(The Gambia) Medina United	0–0	1–1
Maghreb Fez (Morocco)	4–1	(Burkina Faso) Rahimo	4–1	0–0
ASC Kara (Togo)	2–3	(Ivory Coast) ASEC Mimosas	1–1	1–2
Canchungo (Guinea-Bissau)	0–2	(Senegal) Teungueth	0–1	0–1
Colombe Sportive (Cameroon)	0–0 (4–3 p)	(Mali) Stade Malien	0–0	0–0
Rangers (Nigeria)	2–2 (5–4 p)	(Benin) Sobemap	1–1	1–1
ASN Nigelec (Niger)	0–5	(Algeria) MC Alger	0–0	0–5
San Pédro (Ivory Coast)	3–3 (a)	(Nigeria) Rivers United	1–1	2–2
Vipers (Uganda)	1–1 (a)	(Mauritania) Nouadhibou	1–1	0–0
JS Saoura (Algeria)	2–3	(Guinea) Horoya	1–0	1–3
Al Merrikh (Sudan)	2–0	(Zambia) Power Dynamos	1–0	1–0
Medeama (Ghana)	1–4	(Democratic Republic of the Congo) TP Mazembe	0–1	1–3
Club Africain (Tunisia)	3–2	(Mali) Djoliba	1–0	2–2

6 September 2026
16:00 UTC+1

Wiliete (Angola)	4–0	(Seychelles) Foresters
Gibelé 22'; Mabululu 38', 57'; Cangué 81'	Report

Tundavala Stadium, Lubango
10 September 2026
16:00 UTC+1

Foresters (Seychelles)	0–1	(Angola) Wiliete
	Report	Mabululu 53'

Tundavala Stadium, Lubango Angola
Referee: David Chinoko (Malawi)

Wiliete won 5–0 on aggregate.

6 September 2026
15:00 UTC+2

Scottland (Zimbabwe)	1–0	(Eswatini) Nsingizini Hotspurs
Tengeg 65'	Report

National Sports Stadium, Harare
Referee: Sikhumbuzo Gasa (South Africa)
12 September 2026
15:00 UTC+2

Nsingizini Hotspurs (Eswatini)	0–0	(Zimbabwe) Scottland
	Report

Somhlolo National Stadium, Lobamba
Referee: Andrisoa Zafimahatoha (Madagascar)

Scottland won 1–0 on aggregate.

6 September 2026
14:00 UTC+2

UD Songo (Mozambique)	0–1	(Angola) Petro de Luanda
	Report	Depú 55'

Zimpeto Stadium, Maputo
Referee: Masixole Bambiso (South Africa)
12 September 2026
16:00 UTC+1

Petro de Luanda (Angola)	2–2	(Mozambique) UD Songo
Toro 15'; Depú 69'	Report	Macaime 50'; Diaw 70'

11 November Stadium, Luanda

Petro de Luanda won 3–2 on aggregate.

5 September 2026
15:30 UTC+1

Mangasport (Gabon)	3–1	(Namibia) African Stars
Olouonodia 23', 42'; Mbingui 73'	Report	Masialeti 90'

Franceville Stadium, Franceville
12 September 2026
15:00 UTC+2

African Stars (Namibia)	2–0	(Gabon) Mangasport
Doeseb 14'; April 55'	Report

Lucas Moripe Stadium, Atteridgeville (South Africa)

3–3 on aggregate. African Stars won on away goals.

6 September 2026
15:30 UTC+4

La Cure Waves (Mauritius)	0–0	(South Africa) Orlando Pirates
	Report

Côte d'Or National Sports Complex, Saint Pierre
Referee: Retšelisitsoe Molise (Lesotho)
12 September 2026
15:00 UTC+2

Orlando Pirates (South Africa)	3–1	(Mauritius) La Cure Waves
Kgositsile 8'; Sebelebele 24'; Mbuthuma 36'	Report	Ami 6'

Orlando Stadium, Johannesburg

Orlando Pirates won 3–1 on aggregate.

11 September 2026
15:00 UTC+1

15 de Agosto (Equatorial Guinea)	4–0	(Comoros) Fomboni
Ondo 10'; Eko 42', 67'; Alozie 76'	Report

Ahmadou Ahidjo Stadium, Yaoundé (Cameroon)
3 October 2026
15:00 UTC+3

Fomboni (Comoros)	0–1	(Equatorial Guinea) 15 de Agosto
	Report

Malouzini Stadium, Iconi (Comoros)

15 de Agosto won 5–0 on aggregate.

6 September 2026
15:00 UTC+2

Mighty Wanderers (Malawi)	0–1	(Tanzania) Simba
	Report	Oura 66'

Bingu National Stadium, Lilongwe
Referee: Charles Bulu (Ghana)
13 September 2026
16:00 UTC+3

Simba (Tanzania)	6–1	(Malawi) Mighty Wanderers
Chama 8', 34'; Guèye 27', 69'; Makgalwa 88'; Abraham 90+4'	Report	Nyondo 44'

Uhuru Stadium, Dar es Salaam

Simba won 7–1 on aggregate.

5 September 2026
18:00 UTC+4

CFFA (Madagascar)	2–0	(Lesotho) Lijabatho
Gone 50'; Fitahiana 90+3'	Report

Côte d'Or National Sports Complex, Saint Pierre (Mauritius)
12 September 2026
16:00 UTC+2

Lijabatho (Lesotho)	1–1	(Madagascar) CFFA
	Report

Dobsonville Stadium, Johannesburg (South Africa)
Referee: Owen Manenda (Zimbabwe)

CFFA won 3–1 on aggregate.

5 September 2026
19:00 UTC+2

Gaborone United (Botswana)	1–1	(Tanzania) Young Africans
Ambrosius 32'	Report	Mwalimu 90+6'

National Stadium, Gaborone
12 September 2026
19:00 UTC+3

Young Africans (Tanzania)	2–1	(Botswana) Gaborone United
Shalulile 7'; Touré 84'	Report	Ditsele 87'

Chamazi Stadium, Dar es Salaam

Young Africans won 3–2 on aggregate.

4 September 2026
19:00 UTC+2

Asswehly (Libya)	1–0	(Zanzibar) KVZ FC
Al Orfi 66'	Report

Misurata Stadium, Misrata
Referee: Juanilson Gomes (Cape Verde)
13 September 2026
15:00 UTC+3

KVZ FC (Zanzibar)	0–3	(Libya) Asswehly
	Report	John 70'; Sola 76'; Khatwa 90+5'

Amaan Stadium, Zanzibar City

Asswehly won 3–1 on aggregate.

6 September 2026
15:00 UTC+2

Aigles du Congo (Democratic Republic of the Congo)	1–0	(Rwanda) APR
Zemanga 45'	Report

Frederic Kibassa Maliba Stadium, Lubumbashi
Referee: Adissa Abdul Ligali (Benin)
11 September 2026
18:00 UTC+2

APR (Rwanda)	3–0	(Democratic Republic of the Congo) Aigles du Congo
Ouattara 32', 75'; Ishimwe 58'	Report

Amahoro Stadium, Kigali

APR won 3–1 on aggregate.

4 September 2026
20:00 UTC+3

AS Port (Djibouti)	1–2	(Egypt) Zamalek
Mahabeh 82'	Report	Shehata 5'; Banza 37'

Cairo International Stadium, Cairo (Egypt)
Referee: Hamidou Diero (Burkina Faso)
12 September 2026
20:00 UTC+3

Zamalek (Egypt)	4–0	(Djibouti) AS Port
El Said 7', 8', 18'; Mansi 90+3'	Report

Cairo International Stadium, Cairo
Referee: Bertrand Manirakiza (Burundi)

Zamalek won 6–1 on aggregate.

5 September 2026
15:00 UTC+2

El Merriekh Bentiu (South Sudan)	1–0	(Somalia) Heegan
Meat 9'	Report

Juba Stadium, Juba
Referee: Daniel Yitagesu (Ethiopia)
12 September 2026
15:00 UTC+2

Heegan (Somalia)	0–3	(South Sudan) El Merriekh Bentiu
	Report	Meat 45+5'; Mangar 58'; Attor 90+5'

Juba Stadium, Juba (South Sudan)

El Merriekh Bentiu won 4–0 on aggregate.

6 September 2026
15:00 UTC+3

Gor Mahia (Kenya)	0–2	(Egypt) Pyramids
	Report	El Karti 5'; Saber 45+4'

Nyayo National Stadium, Nairobi
Referee: Rafiq Aouina (Algeria)
13 September 2026
20:00 UTC+3

Pyramids (Egypt)	5–1	(Kenya) Gor Mahia
El Karti 27'; Maher 37'; Obama 45+1'; Ziko 90'; Zalaka 90+1'	Report	Okoth 45+3'

30 June Stadium, Cairo
Referee: Patience Fidele Rurisa (Rwanda)

Pyramids won 7–1 on aggregate.

5 September 2026
15:30 UTC+1

Aiglons (Chad)	0–0	(Ethiopia) Sidama
	Report

Idriss Déby Itno Stadium, N'Djamena
Referee: Emmanuel Mensah (Liberia)
13 September 2026
16:00 UTC+3

Sidama (Ethiopia)	3–0	(Chad) Aiglons
Yalew 4', 67'; Demu 11'	Report

Dire Dawa Stadium, Dire Dawa

Sidama won 3–0 on aggregate.

5 September 2026
15:00 UTC+2

Aigle Noir (Burundi)	0–2	(Sudan) Al Hilal
	Report	Awad 18'; M'Bareck 55'

Intwari Stadium, Bujumbura
Referee: Dick Okello (Uganda)
12 September 2026
15:00 UTC+2

Al Hilal (Sudan)	1–0	(Burundi) Aigle Noir
M'Bareck 43'	Report

Amahoro Stadium, Kigali (Rwanda)
Referee: Dickens Nyagrowa (Kenya)

Al Hilal won 3–0 on aggregate.

5 September 2026
16:00 UTC+0

Star Sport Academy (Sierra Leone)	0–0	(The Gambia) Medina United
	Report

Southern Arena, Bo
Referee: Mahmoud Wafa (Egypt)
12 September 2026
16:00 UTC+0

Medina United (The Gambia)	1–1	(Sierra Leone) Star Sport Academy
Sanyang 90+3'	Report	Fornah 52'

Independence Stadium, Bakau

1–1 on aggregate. Star Sport Academy won on away goals.

6 September 2026
20:00 UTC+1

Maghreb Fez (Morocco)	4–1	(Burkina Faso) Rahimo
Brika 7'; Allouch 45+1'; Titus 71'; Ibayi 76'	Report	Ouédraogo 59'

Fez Stadium, Fez
Referee: Moussa Diou (Mauritania)
12 September 2026
15:00 UTC+0

Rahimo (Burkina Faso)	0–0	(Morocco) Maghreb Fez
	Report

4 August Stadium, Ouagadougou
Referee: Thierno Mamandou Dia (Senegal)

Maghreb Fez won 4–1 on aggregate.

6 September 2026
15:30 UTC+0

ASC Kara (Togo)	1–1	(Ivory Coast) ASEC Mimosas
Assigno 20'	Report	Kouyaté 40'

Kégué Stadium, Lomé
Referee: Fraj Abdellaoui (Tunisia)
13 September 2026
16:00 UTC+0

ASEC Mimosas (Ivory Coast)	2–1	(Togo) ASC Kara
Sou 59' (pen.), 67' (pen.)	Report	Yendoubouame 45'

Felix Houphouet Boigny Stadium, Abidjan

ASEC Mimosas won 3–2 on aggregate.

5 September 2026
16:00 UTC+0

Canchungo (Guinea-Bissau)	0–1	(Senegal) Teungueth
	Report	Diaw 90+10'

24 September Stadium, Bissau
Referee: Abdallah Jammeh (Gambia)
13 September 2026
17:00 UTC+0

Teungueth (Senegal)	1–0	(Guinea-Bissau) Canchungo
Aïdara 50'	Report

Leopold Sédar Senghor Stadium, Dakar

Teungueth won 2–0 on aggregate.

6 September 2026
16:00 UTC+1

Colombe Sportive (Cameroon)	0–0	(Mali) Stade Malien
	Report

Ahmadou Ahidjo Stadium, Yaoundé
Referee: Ben Ali Touré (Ivory Coast)
13 September 2026
16:00 UTC+0

Stade Malien (Mali)	0–0	(Cameroon) Colombe Sportive
	Report

26 March Stadium, Bamako

0–0 on aggregate. Colombe Sportive won 4–3 on penalties.

6 September 2026
16:00 UTC+1

Rangers (Nigeria)	1–1	(Benin) Sobemap
Iwundu 32'	Report	Ali 46'

MKO Abiola Stadium, Abeokuta
Referee: Jean-Marc Ganamandji (Central Africa)
11 September 2026
14:00 UTC+0

Sobemap (Benin)	1–1	(Nigeria) Rangers
65'	Report	21' (o.g.)

Kégué Stadium, Lomé (Togo)

2–2 on aggregate. Rangers won 5–4 on penalties.

6 September 2026
16:30 UTC+1

ASN Nigelec (Niger)	0–0	(Algeria) MC Alger
	Report

Seyni Kountche Stadium, Niamey
Referee: Adama Koné (Mali)
12 September 2026
20:00 UTC+1

MC Alger (Algeria)	5–0	(Niger) ASN Nigelec
Konaté 17'; Salaou 68' (o.g.); Bangoura 76'; Boukholda 78'; Nduwumwe 82'	Report

Ali La Pointe Stadium, Algiers
Referee: Sabri Mohamed Fadul (Sudan)

MC Alger won 5–0 on aggregate.

5 September 2026
16:00 UTC+0

San Pédro (Ivory Coast)	1–1	(Nigeria) Rivers United
Dosso 55'	Report	Douglas 69'

Laurent Pokou Stadium, San Pédro
Referee: Cregue Flaury Moukagni (Gabon)
13 September 2026
16:00 UTC+1

Rivers United (Nigeria)	2–2	(Ivory Coast) San Pédro
	Report

Godswill Akpabio International Stadium, Uyo

3–3 on aggregate. San Pédro won on away goals.

5 September 2026
19:00 UTC+3

Vipers (Uganda)	1–1	(Mauritania) Nouadhibou
Mukundane 3'	Report	El Abd 23'

St. Mary's Stadium, Entebbe
Referee: Daniel Yitagesu (Ethiopia)
13 September 2026
18:00 UTC+0

Nouadhibou (Mauritania)	0–0	(Uganda) Vipers
	Report

Nouadhibou Municipal Stadium, Nouadhibou

1–1 on aggregate. Nouadhibou won on away goals.

4 September 2026
19:00 UTC+1

JS Saoura (Algeria)	1–0	(Guinea) Horoya
Bentaleb 44'	Report

Miloud Hadefi Stadium, Oran
Referee: Nasir Salum Siyah (Tanzania)
13 September 2026
16:00 UTC+0

Horoya (Guinea)	3–1	(Algeria) JS Saoura
Barry 17' (pen.); Sylla 90'; Coulibaly 90+2'	Report	Haddouche 57'

28 September Stadium, Conakry
Referee: Louis Mwamba Masangune (DR Congo)

Horoya won 3–2 on aggregate.

5 September 2026
19:00 UTC+2

Al Merrikh (Sudan)	1–0	(Zambia) Power Dynamos
Bangoura 37' (pen.)	Report

Amahoro Stadium, Kigali (Rwanda)
Referee: Amir Loucif (Tunisia)
12 September 2026
15:00 UTC+2

Power Dynamos (Zambia)	0–1	(Sudan) Al Merrikh
	Report	Feno 51'

Levy Mwanawasa Stadium, Ndola
Referee: Daouda Guèye (Senegal)

Al Merrikh won 2–0 on aggregate.

6 September 2026
15:00 UTC+0

Medeama (Ghana)	0–1	(Democratic Republic of the Congo) TP Mazembe
	Report	Ntumba 87'

TNA Park, Tarkwa
Referee: Joseph Ogabor (Nigeria)
12 September 2026
15:00 UTC+2

TP Mazembe (Democratic Republic of the Congo)	3–1	(Ghana) Medeama
Mwaungulu 3', 88'; Baso 19'	Report	Amponsah 90+6'

TP Mazembe Stadium, Lubumbashi
Referee: Jelly Chavani (South Africa)

TP Mazembe won 4–1 on aggregate.

5 September 2026
19:00 UTC+1

Club Africain (Tunisia)	1–0	(Mali) Djoliba
Kadida 71'	Report

Hammadi Agrebi Stadium, Tunis
Referee: Jean-Pierre Nguyen (DR Congo)
12 September 2026
16:00 UTC+0

Djoliba (Mali)	2–2	(Tunisia) Club Africain
Kouyaté 16'; Araba 50'	Report	Kadida 18'; Nkeng 76'

Mamadou Konaté Stadium, Bamako
Referee: Richard Kokora (Ivory Coast)

Club Africain won 3–2 on aggregate.

== Second round ==
The second round, also called the second preliminary round, included 32 teams: the 3 teams that received byes to this round, and the 29 winners of the first round.

Team 1	Agg.	Team 2	1st leg	2nd leg
Wiliete (Angola)	1–1 (a)	(South Africa) Mamelodi Sundowns	0–0	1–1
Scottland (Zimbabwe)	2–3	(Angola) Petro de Luanda	2–0	0–3
African Stars (Namibia)	0–5	(South Africa) Orlando Pirates	0–1	0–4
15 de Agosto (Equatorial Guinea)	1–9	(Tanzania) Simba	1–6	0–3
CFFA (Madagascar)	1–8	(Tanzania) Young Africans	0–4	1–4
Asswehly (Libya)	1–1 (1–3 p)	(Tunisia) Espérance de Tunis	1–0	0–1
APR (Rwanda)	0–2	(Egypt) Zamalek	0–1	0–1
El Merriekh Bentiu (South Sudan)	0–5	(Egypt) Pyramids	0–1	0–4
Sidama (Ethiopia)	0–4	(Sudan) Al Hilal	0–2	0–2
Star Sport Academy (Sierra Leone)	0–3	(Morocco) RS Berkane	0–2	0–1
Maghreb Fez (Morocco)	3–2	(Ivory Coast) ASEC Mimosas	1–1	2–1
Teungueth (Senegal)	0–3	(Cameroon) Colombe Sportive	0–2	0–1
Rangers (Nigeria)	2–3	(Algeria) MC Alger	2–0	0–3
San Pédro (Ivory Coast)	2–3	(Mauritania) Nouadhibou	2–1	0–2
Horoya (Guinea)	1–1 (5–3 p)	(Sudan) Al Merrikh	1–0	0–1
TP Mazembe (Democratic Republic of the Congo)	1–2	(Tunisia) Club Africain	1–1	0–1

18 October 2026
16:00 UTC+1

Wiliete (Angola)	0–0	(South Africa) Mamelodi Sundowns
	Report

Tundavala Stadium, Lubango
23 October 2026
20:00 UTC+2

Mamelodi Sundowns (South Africa)	1–1	(Angola) Wiliete
Matthews 11'	Report	Mabululu 49'

Loftus Versfeld Stadium, Pretoria

1–1 on aggregate. Wiliete won on away goals.

18 October 2026
15:00 UTC+2

Scottland (Zimbabwe)	2–0	(Angola) Petro de Luanda
Billiat 67'; Musona 80'	Report

National Sports Stadium, Harare
23 October 2026
17:00 UTC+1

Petro de Luanda (Angola)	3–0	(Zimbabwe) Scottland
Rúben 19'; Pereira 67'; Aparício 85'	Report

11 November Stadium, Luanda

Petro de Luanda won 3–2 on aggregate.

17 October 2026
15:00 UTC+2

African Stars (Namibia)	0–1	(South Africa) Orlando Pirates
	Report	Moremi 78'

Botswana National Stadium, Gaborone
23 October 2026
19:30 UTC+2

Orlando Pirates (South Africa)	4–0	(Namibia) African Stars
Mokobodi 18'; Makgopa 45', 77'; Padime 46'	Report

Orlando Stadium, Johannesburg

Orlando Pirates won 5–0 on aggregate.

20 October 2026
16:00 UTC+3

15 de Agosto (Equatorial Guinea)	1–6	(Tanzania) Simba
	Report	Chilambo 43'; Mpanzu 56'; Makgalwa 65', 88'; Makgalwa 74'; Oura 82'

Uhuru Stadium, Dar es Salaam (Tanzania)
25 October 2026
16:00 UTC+3

Simba (Tanzania)	3–0	(Equatorial Guinea) 15 de Agosto
Oura 57'; Mpanzu 69'; Makgalwa 78'	Report

Uhuru Stadium, Dar es Salaam

Simba won 9–1 on aggregate.

17 October 2026
15:00 UTC+3

CFFA (Madagascar)	0–4	(Tanzania) Young Africans
	Report	Touré 40'; Kangwanda 48'; Yahya 55'; Nzengeli 59'

Chamazi Stadium, Dar es Salaam (Tanzania)
21 October 2026
19:00 UTC+3

Young Africans (Tanzania)	4–1	(Madagascar) CFFA
Kazimoto 27'; Mwalimu 48', 52'; Chuga 83'	Report	Albertini 74'

Chamazi Stadium, Dar es Salaam

Young Africans won 8–1 on aggregate.

18 October 2026
19:00 UTC+2

Asswehly (Libya)	1–0	(Tunisia) Espérance de Tunis
Ayed 64' (pen.)	Report

Misurata Stadium, Misrata
Referee: Jean-Pierre Nguyen (DR Congo)
24 October 2026
17:00 UTC+1

Espérance de Tunis (Tunisia)	1–0	(Libya) Asswehly
Faraj 8'	Report
Penalties
Ribeiro (penalty scored); Rafia (penalty missed); Hadj Ali (penalty scored); Alilet (penalty scored)	3–1	(penalty missed) Ayed; (penalty scored) Ghandri; (penalty missed) Elgelaib; (penalty missed) Banda

Hammadi Agrebi Stadium, Tunis
Referee: Jalal Jayed (Morocco)

1–1 on aggregate. Espérance de Tunis won 3–1 on penalties.

16 October 2026
16:00 UTC+2

APR (Rwanda)	0–1	(Egypt) Zamalek
	Report	Mansi 90'

Amahoro Stadium, Kigali
Referee: Abdou Mefire (Cameroon)
24 October 2026
20:00 UTC+3

Zamalek (Egypt)	1–0	(Rwanda) APR
Sherif 1'	Report

Cairo International Stadium, Cairo
Referee: Issa Sy (Senegal)

Zamalek won 2–0 on aggregate.

16 October 2026
15:30 UTC+2

El Merriekh Bentiu (South Sudan)	0–1	(Egypt) Pyramids
	Report	Saber 32'

Juba Stadium, Juba
Referee: Charles Bulu (Ghana)
24 October 2026
20:00 UTC+3

Pyramids (Egypt)	4–0	(South Sudan) El Merriekh Bentiu
Magdy 23', 28'; Fathi 45+2'; Benbouali 71'	Report

30 June Stadium, Cairo
Referee: Boubou Traoré (Mali)

Pyramids won 5–0 on aggregate.

18 October 2026
16:00 UTC+3

Sidama (Ethiopia)	0–2	(Sudan) Al Hilal
	Report	11' (o.g.); Abdelrahman 90+3'

Dire Dawa Stadium, Dire Dawa
Referee: Pacifique Ndabihawenimana (Burundi)
25 October 2026
18:00 UTC+2

Al Hilal (Sudan)	2–0	(Ethiopia) Sidama
Luzolo 34'; Abdelrahman 45+5'	Report

Amahoro Stadium, Kigali (Rwanda)
Referee: Mahamat Alladj Allaou (Chad)

Pyramids won 4–0 on aggregate.

17 October 2026
16:00 UTC+0

Star Sport Academy (Sierra Leone)	0–2	(Morocco) RS Berkane
	Report	Lamlioui 14', 45'

Samuel Kanyon Doe Sports Complex, Monrovia, (Liberia)
Referee: Ahmed Arajiga (Tanzania)
24 October 2026
20:00 UTC+1

RS Berkane (Morocco)	1–0	(Sierra Leone) Star Sport Academy
Mehri 53'	Report

Berkane Municipal Stadium, Berkane
Referee: Mahmood Ismail (Sudan)

RS Berkane won 3–0 on aggregate.

18 October 2026
19:00 UTC+1

Maghreb Fez (Morocco)	1–1	(Ivory Coast) ASEC Mimosas
Chbani 31'	Report	Bamba 90+3'

Meknes Honor Stadium, Meknes
Referee: Mohamed Athoumani (Comoros)
25 October 2026
16:00 UTC+0

ASEC Mimosas (Ivory Coast)	1–2	(Morocco) Maghreb Fez
Bakaré 73'	Report	Ibayi 62'; Baba 90+7'

Felix Houphouet Boigny Stadium, Abidjan

Maghreb Fez won 3–2 on aggregate.

18 October 2026
17:00 UTC+0

Teungueth (Senegal)	0–2	(Cameroon) Colombe Sportive
	Report	Eyango 14'; Musah 46'

Leopold Sédar Senghor Stadium, Dakar
25 October 2026
16:00 UTC+1

Colombe Sportive (Cameroon)	1–0	(Senegal) Teungueth
Eyango 1'	Report

Ahmadou Ahidjo Stadium, Yaoundé

Colombe Sportive won 3–0 on aggregate.

18 October 2026
14:00 UTC+1

Rangers (Nigeria)	2–0	(Algeria) MC Alger
Igboke 87' (pen.); Emo 90'	Report

MKO Abiola Stadium, Abeokuta
Referee: Washington Dolo (Liberia)
23 October 2026
20:00 UTC+1

MC Alger (Algeria)	3–0	(Nigeria) Rangers
Boukholda 58'; Bangoura 84'; Bayazid 90+2'	Report

Ali La Pointe Stadium, Algiers
Referee: David Molise (Lesotho)

MC Alger won 3–2 on aggregate.

17 October 2026
16:00 UTC+0

San Pédro (Ivory Coast)	2–1	(Mauritania) Nouadhibou
Niambé 40'; Karamoko 90+8'	Report	M’bareck 39'

Laurent Pokou Stadium, San Pédro
25 October 2026
17:00 UTC+0

Nouadhibou (Mauritania)	2–0	(Ivory Coast) San Pédro
Dembele 10'; Hattab 53'	Report

Nouadhibou Municipal Stadium, Nouadhibou

Nouadhibou won 3–2 on aggregate.

18 October 2026
16:00 UTC+0

Horoya (Guinea)	1–0	(Sudan) Al Merrikh
Barry 39'	Report

28 September Stadium, Conakry
24 October 2026
19:00 UTC+2

Al Merrikh (Sudan)	1–0	(Guinea) Horoya
Gbane 70'	Report
Penalties
	3–5

Amahoro Stadium, Kigali (Rwanda)

1–1 on aggregate. Horoya won 5–3 on penalties.

17 October 2026
15:00 UTC+2

TP Mazembe (Democratic Republic of the Congo)	1–1	(Tunisia) Club Africain
Baso 38'	Report	Kanté 39'

TP Mazembe Stadium, Lubumbashi
25 October 2026
18:00 UTC+1

Club Africain (Tunisia)	1–0	(Democratic Republic of the Congo) TP Mazembe
Nkeng 45+2'	Report

Hammadi Agrebi Stadium, Tunis

Club Africain won 2–1 on aggregate.

== See also ==
- 2026–27 CAF Confederation Cup qualifying rounds
