= Aloisi =

Aloisi is a surname. Notable people with the surname include:

- Antonio Aloisi (born 1968), Italian footballer and manager
- Baldassare Aloisi (1578–1638), Italian painter
- Chris Aloisi (born 1981), American footballer
- Irene Aloisi (1925–1980), Italian actress
- James Aloisi, American lawyer and politician
- John Aloisi (born 1976), Australian footballer
- Ross Aloisi (born 1973), Australian footballer

== See also ==
- Aloisi Masella (disambiguation)
- Alozie, surname
- Meryem Benm'Barek-Aloïsi (born 1984), Moroccan film director and screenwriter
- Polyommatus aloisi, species of butterfly
- Premio Carlo e Francesco Aloisi, Italian horse race
