= 2026–27 in Egyptian football =

2026–27 football season in Egyptian football

Football in Egypt
- Season: 2026–27

This article summarizes the activity of Egyptian football during the 2026–27 season, including domestic and international tournaments for senior and youth teams.

== National teams ==
=== Men ===
==== Senior ====
===== Friendlies =====
4 October 2026	Egypt	0–1	South Africa	Cairo, Egypt
		Report	Dithejane 51'

===== 2027 Africa Cup of Nations qualification =====
Group B

Pos	Team	Pld	W	D	L	GF	GA	GD	Pts	Qualification	(Angola)	(Egypt)	(Malawi)	(South Sudan)
1	Angola	4	3	1	0	6	1	+5	10	Final tournament	—	24 Mar	3–1	2–0
2	Egypt	4	2	2	0	10	0	+10	8	Final tournament	0–0	—	5–0	28 Mar
3	Malawi	4	1	1	2	3	9	−6	4		28 Mar	0–0	—	2–1
4	South Sudan (E)	4	0	0	4	1	10	−9	0		0–1	0–5	24 Mar	—

Updated to match(es) played on 17 November 2026. Source: CAF
Rules for classification: Tiebreakers
(E) Eliminated

25 September 2026 1	Egypt	0–0	Angola	Cairo, Egypt
		Report		Stadium: Cairo International Stadium

29 September 2026 2	South Sudan	0–5	Egypt	South Sudan
		Report	Zico 36'; Marmoush 49', 83'; I. Adel 75'; Abdelkarim 90+2'

13 November 2026 3	Egypt	5–0	Malawi	Cairo, Egypt
21:00 EET (UTC+2)	N. Maher 6'; Marmoush 10'; Hany 38'; Salah 84', 90+5' (pen.)	Report		Stadium: Cairo International Stadium
Note: First match under Ali Maher. Salah became Egypt's all-time top scorer with 70 goals.

17 November 2026 4	Malawi	0–0	Egypt	Lilongwe, Malawi
13:00 GMT (UTC±0)		Report		Stadium: Bingu National Stadium

==== U20 ====
===== 2027 Africa Cup of Nations U-20 qualification =====
Egypt hosted the UNAF qualifying tournament in Ismailia (21 September – 6 October 2026) and qualified for the finals in Ghana as group winners.

Pos	Team	Pld	W	D	L	GF	GA	GD	Pts	Qualification
1	Egypt (H)	4	3	0	1	6	3	+3	9	2027 U-20 Africa Cup of Nations
2	Morocco	4	2	1	1	7	4	+3	7	2027 U-20 Africa Cup of Nations
3	Algeria	4	1	1	2	5	7	−2	4 (Note: Head-to-head result: Libya 1–3 Algeria.)	
4	Libya	4	1	1	2	5	8	−3	4	
5	Tunisia	4	0	3	1	3	4	−1	3	

Source: UNAF
Rules for classification: 1) Points; 2) Goal difference; 3) Goals scored
(H) Hosts
Notes:

24 September 2026	Egypt	2–0	Libya	Ismailia, Egypt
	Awad 19'; Hamdy 56'	Report		Stadium: Suez Canal Stadium

30 September 2026	Egypt	2–1	Tunisia	Ismailia, Egypt
	El Shamy 16' (pen.); Hamad 32'	Report	Saidi 66'	Stadium: Suez Canal Stadium

3 October 2026	Egypt	0–2	Morocco	Ismailia, Egypt
		Report	Baallal 25'; Bouhoudane 33'	Stadium: Suez Canal Stadium

6 October 2026	Algeria	0–2	Egypt	Ismailia, Egypt
		Report	Salah 22'; Roshdy 82'	Stadium: Ismailia Stadium

==== Egypt U-17 ====
===== 2027 Africa Cup of Nations U-17 qualification =====
Egypt took part in the 2026 UNAF U-17 Tournament, the 2027 U-17 Africa Cup of Nations qualifiers for UNAF teams, held in Monastir and Sousse, Tunisia in November 2026. The tournament was contested by five teams, with the top teams qualifying for the finals.

The tournament schedule was reset following Libya's withdrawal on the same day.

Pos	Team	Pld	W	D	L	GF	GA	GD	Pts	Qualification
1	Algeria	3	2	0	1	3	4	−1	6	Final tournament
2	Egypt	3	2	0	1	3	2	+1	6	Final tournament
3	Morocco	3	1	0	2	5	3	+2	3	Final tournament as the host nation
4	Tunisia (H)	3	1	0	2	6	8	−2	3	

Source: UNAF
(H) Hosts

10 November 2026	Tunisia	1–2	Egypt	Sousse, Tunisia
	Zribi 20'	Report	Shaboun 9', 89'	Stadium: Sousse Olympic Stadium; Referee: Abdelouahed Haridioua (Libya)

13 November 2026	Egypt	1–0	Morocco	Sousse, Tunisia
	Ali 11'	Report		Stadium: Sousse Olympic Stadium; Referee: Rafik Aouina (Algeria)

16 November 2026	Algeria	1–0	Egypt	Monastir, Tunisia
	Daoud 8'	Report		Stadium: Mustapha Ben Jannet Stadium; Referee: Bassem Belaid (Tunisia)

== International competitions ==
=== CAF competitions ===
==== CAF Champions League ====
Egypt's representatives are Zamalek (league champions) and Pyramids (runners-up).

First preliminary round

Team 1	Agg.	Team 2	1st leg	2nd leg
AS Port (Djibouti)	1–6	(Egypt) Zamalek	1–2	0–4
Gor Mahia (Kenya)	1–7	(Egypt) Pyramids	0–2	1–5

Second preliminary round

Team 1	Agg.	Team 2	1st leg	2nd leg
APR (Rwanda)	0–2	(Egypt) Zamalek	0–1	0–1
El-Merreikh Bentiu (South Sudan)	0–5	(Egypt) Pyramids	0–1	0–4

Zamalek won the first leg in Kigali through a late goal by Nasser Mansi, and the second leg through Ahmed Sherif's goal in the first minute. Pyramids won the first leg in Juba through Mahmoud Saber.

Group stage

The draw was held in Cairo on 28 October 2026. The group stage runs from 27–29 November 2026 to January 2027, and the top two in each group reach the quarter-finals.

===== Zamalek =====
Group B

Pos	Team	Pld	W	D	L	GF	GA	GD	Pts	Qualification	ZAM	YNG	MCA	CA
1	(Egypt) Zamalek	0	0	0	0	0	0	0	0	Advance to knockout stage	—	18–20 Dec	22–24 Jan	28 Nov
2	(Tanzania) Young Africans	0	0	0	0	0	0	0	0	Advance to knockout stage	8–10 Jan	—	28 Nov	22–24 Jan
3	(Algeria) MC Alger	0	0	0	0	0	0	0	0		4 Dec	15–17 Jan	—	8–10 Jan
4	(Tunisia) Club Africain	0	0	0	0	0	0	0	0		15–17 Jan	5 Dec	18–20 Dec	—

First match(es) will be played: 28 November 2026. Source: CAF
Rules for classification: Group stage tiebreakers

Zamalek's fixtures (date windows set by CAF):

Home team	Score	Away team
Zamalek (Egypt)	29 Nov	(Tunisia) Club Africain
MC Alger (Algeria)	6 Dec	(Egypt) Zamalek
Zamalek (Egypt)	20 Dec	(Tanzania) Young Africans
Young Africans (Tanzania)	10 Jan	(Egypt) Zamalek
Club Africain (Tunisia)	17 Jan	(Egypt) Zamalek
Zamalek (Egypt)	24 Jan	(Algeria) MC Alger

===== Pyramids =====
Group D

Pos	Team	Pld	W	D	L	GF	GA	GD	Pts	Qualification	PYR	HIL	HAC	MAS
1	(Egypt) Pyramids	0	0	0	0	0	0	0	0	Advance to knockout stage	—	18–20 Dec	22–24 Jan	28 Nov
2	(Sudan) Al Hilal	0	0	0	0	0	0	0	0	Advance to knockout stage	8–10 Jan	—	29 Nov	22–24 Jan
3	(Guinea) Horoya AC	0	0	0	0	0	0	0	0		6 Dec	15–17 Jan	—	8–10 Jan
4	(Morocco) Maghreb Fez	0	0	0	0	0	0	0	0		15–17 Jan	5 Dec	18–20 Dec	—

First match(es) will be played: 28 November 2026. Source: CAF
Rules for classification: Group stage tiebreakers

Home team	Score	Away team
Pyramids (Egypt)	28 Nov	(Morocco) MAS
Al-Hilal (Sudan)	6 Dec	(Egypt) Pyramids
Pyramids (Egypt)	20 Dec	(Guinea) HAC
HAC (Guinea)	10 Jan	(Egypt) Pyramids
Pyramids (Egypt)	17 Jan	(Sudan) Al-Hilal
MAS (Morocco)	24 Jan	(Egypt) Pyramids

==== CAF Confederation Cup ====
Egypt's representatives are Al Ahly (third in the league) and ZED (Egypt Cup runners-up, making their continental debut).

First preliminary round

Team 1	Agg.	Team 2	1st leg	2nd leg
ZED (Egypt)	5–1	ASAS Djibouti Telecom	4–0	1–1

Both legs were played in Cairo (4–0 at Cairo International Stadium, then 1–1 at Al Salam Stadium on 12 September). Al Ahly received a bye.

Second preliminary round

Team 1	Agg.	Team 2	1st leg	2nd leg
ZED (Egypt)	1–2	(Tanzania) Azam	1–1	0–1
Kitara (Uganda)	1–6	(Egypt) Al Ahly	1–2	0–4

Al Ahly won the first leg in Hoima on 17 October (Omar El Saaiy and a Zizo penalty after Gaddafi Wahab had given Kitara the lead) and the second leg in Cairo on 25 October, with goals from Hussein El Shahat (two), Mohamed Magdy Afsha and Taher Mohamed Taher. ZED were eliminated by Azam, who won the second leg 1–0.

Group stage

The draw was held in Cairo on 28 October 2026. The group stage starts on 27–29 November 2026.

===== Al Ahly =====
Group A

Pos	Team	Pld	W	D	L	GF	GA	GD	Pts	Qualification
1	(Egypt) Al Ahly	0	0	0	0	0	0	0	0	Advance to knockout stage
2	(Morocco) Raja CA	0	0	0	0	0	0	0	0	Advance to knockout stage
3	(Togo) ASKO Kara	0	0	0	0	0	0	0	0	
4	(Angola) Primeiro de Agosto	0	0	0	0	0	0	0	0	

First match(es) will be played: 27 November 2026. Source: CAF
Rules for classification: Group stage tiebreakers

Home team	Score	Away team
Al Ahly (Egypt)	29 Nov	(Angola) Primeiro de Agosto
ASKO Kara (Togo)	6 Dec	(Egypt) Al Ahly
Al Ahly (Egypt)	20 Dec	(Morocco) Raja CA
Raja CA (Morocco)	10 Jan	(Egypt) Al Ahly
Primeiro de Agosto (Angola)	17 Jan	(Egypt) Al Ahly
Al Ahly (Egypt)	24 Jan	(Togo) ASKO Kara

Al Ahly open at home against Primeiro de Agosto (27–29 November), host Raja on 18–20 December and visit Raja on 8–10 January.

== Domestic competitions ==
=== Premier League ===
The 68th edition began on 21 August 2026 with 20 clubs. The first phase is a single round-robin (19 matches per club) ending on 20 February 2027; the top six then play a championship group from 8 March 2027 and the other 14 play a relegation group. Four clubs will be relegated and three promoted, leaving 19 clubs in 2027–28.

==== First phase table ====
Pos	Team	Pld	W	D	L	GF	GA	GD	Pts	Qualification or relegation
1	Pyramids	8	8	0	0	19	4	+15	24	Qualification for the championship play-offs
2	Al Ahly	8	6	2	0	15	6	+9	20	Qualification for the championship play-offs
3	Zamalek	8	6	1	1	11	4	+7	19	Qualification for the championship play-offs
4	Ceramica Cleopatra	8	6	0	2	15	8	+7	18	Qualification for the championship play-offs
5	Al Ittihad	8	4	2	2	9	6	+3	14	Qualification for the championship play-offs
6	Modern Sport	8	4	1	3	12	10	+2	13	Qualification for the championship play-offs
7	Al Mokawloon Al Arab	8	3	2	3	11	8	+3	11	Qualification for the relegation play-offs
8	National Bank of Egypt	8	3	2	3	9	9	0	11	Qualification for the relegation play-offs
9	Smouha	8	3	2	3	5	5	0	11	Qualification for the relegation play-offs
10	ZED	8	3	2	3	9	10	−1	11	Qualification for the relegation play-offs
11	Montakhab El Suez Petrojet	8	2	3	3	11	13	−2	9	Qualification for the relegation play-offs
12	Al Masry	8	2	3	3	8	10	−2	9	Qualification for the relegation play-offs
13	El Qanah	8	1	5	2	10	12	−2	8	Qualification for the relegation play-offs
14	Tala'ea El Gaish	8	2	2	4	6	12	−6	8	Qualification for the relegation play-offs
15	Wadi Degla	8	1	4	3	8	10	−2	7	Qualification for the relegation play-offs
16	El Sharkia Enppi	8	2	1	5	11	16	−5	7	Qualification for the relegation play-offs
17	Ghazl El Mahalla	8	2	1	5	4	11	−7	7	Qualification for the relegation play-offs
18	Asyut Petroleum	8	1	3	4	4	8	−4	6	Qualification for the relegation play-offs
19	Abou Qir	8	1	1	6	3	12	−9	4	Qualification for the relegation play-offs
20	El Gouna	8	0	3	5	5	11	−6	3	Qualification for the relegation play-offs

Updated to match(es) played on 16 November 2026. Source: Soccerway (regular season)
Rules for classification: 1) Points; 2) Goal difference; 3) Goals scored.

==== Selected results ====
Round	Date	Home	Score	Away	Scorers
1	23 August 2026	Al Ahly	3–2	Sharkia ENPPI	Marwan Attia 34', Zizo (pen.) 69', Afsha 90'; Ali Ehab 17', Mohamed Essam 24'
2	26 August 2026	Petrojet	2–3	Tala'ea El Gaish	Godwin Chika 65', Mostafa El Badry 81'; Karim Tarek 19', Islam Mohareb 43', Mohamed Atef 48'
2	27 August 2026	Al Mokawloon Al Arab	2–3	Al Masry	Idrissa Thiam 35', Omar Kamal 77'; Mahmoud Hamada 44', Hussein Faisal 52', Mohamed El Shamy 82'
2	28 August 2026	ENPPI	1–3	Wadi Degla	Kahraba (pen.) 13'; Seif Teka 4', Hamza Hassan (pen.) 62', Zizo 82'
2	28 August 2026	Al Ittihad	1–3	Ceramica Cleopatra	Hossam Hassan 76'; Ahmed Belhadji 45+4', Marwan Osman 66', Nejc Gradišar 78'
3	31 August 2026	Zamalek	2–1	Petrojet	Hossam Ashraf 40', Mohamed El Sayed 63'; Badr Moussa (pen.) 90+1'
4	7 September 2026	NBE Club	3–1	Ghazl El Mahalla	Osama Faisal 16', 48', Ahmed Yasser Rayan 31'; Abdo Yehia 44'
6	11 October 2026	Zamalek	0–2	Al Ahly	Mohamed Hany 39', Monsef Bakrar 80'
6	12 October 2026	Modern Sport	3–2	ENPPI	Mahmoud Mamdouh 21', 22', 42'; Hamed Abdallah 18', Emad Mayhoub 36'
6	12 October 2026	Pyramids	4–1	Ceramica Cleopatra	Mostafa Ziko 15', Nadhir Benbouali, Mohanad Lasheen 37', Youssef Obama 77'; Abdallah Magdy 6'
6	13 October 2026	Petrojet	2–2	Wadi Degla	Ahmed Bahbah 59', Freddy Kouablan 66'; Mahmoud Diasty 6', Ibrahim El Bahnasi 45+2'
7	20 October 2026	ZED	3–2	Modern Sport	Raafat Khalil 35', Ahmed Adel 40', Ahmed Atef 90+5'; Mahmoud Mamdouh 13', 85'
7	20 October 2026	Tala'ea El Gaish	1–4	Pyramids	Ahmed Tarek 34'; Mohanad Lasheen 6', Mostafa Ziko 15', Mahmoud Saber 77', Mahmoud Zalaka (pen.) 89'
7	21 October 2026	Al Ahly	3–3	El Qanah	Omar El Saaiy 18', Achraf Bencharki 43', Achraf Dari 90+3'; Mody Shalata 32', Hazem Abosena 54', Yassin Marei (o.g.) 80'

==== Cairo derby ====
Al Ahly beat Zamalek 2–0 at Cairo International Stadium on 11 October 2026 (round 6) in the 133rd league derby, through Mohamed Hany and Monsef Bakrar. Zamalek's next derby result in the league is in the second half of the season. The next top-of-the-table match is Al Ahly v Pyramids on 23 November 2026.

=== Egypt Cup ===
The draw for the round of 32 to the final was held on 22 October 2026. Pyramids are the holders.

Round of 32
Pyramids	2
El Dakhleya	0
National Bank	4
Port Fouad	1
Al Masry	2
Misr Lel Makkasa	1
Tala'ea El Gaish	0
Asyut Petroleum	1
ZED	5
Samannoud	1
Smouha	2
El Minya	0
Wadi Degla	0(2)
Kahraba Ismailia	0(3)
Ceramica Cleopatra	3
Abou Qir	2
Zamalek	3
Misr Insurance	2
El Sharkia Enppi	3
Proxy	2
El Gouna	4
Ittihad Al Shorta	1
Ghazl El Mahalla	1
Al Ittihad	2
Al Ahly	3
El Sekka El Hadid	0
Suez Petrojet	2^{a.e.t.}
Delphi	0
Al Mokawloon	1
We	0
Modern Sport	0
El Qanah	1

Round of 16
Pyramids
National Bank
Al Masry
Asyut Petroleum
ZED
Smouha
Kahraba Ismailia
Ceramica Cleopatra
Zamalek
El Sharkia Enppi
El Gouna
Al Ittihad
Al Ahly
Suez Petrojet
Al Mokawloon
El Qanah

Quarter-finals

Semi-finals

Final

=== Egyptian League Cup ===
The sixth edition (the Egypt Capital Cup) has 20 clubs in four groups of five; the top two in each group reach the quarter-finals. It began on 7–8 October 2026. Al Masry are the defending champions.

==== Group stage ====
Group A

Pos	Team	Pld	W	D	L	GF	GA	GD	Pts	Qualification
1	Wadi Degla	2	2	0	0	2	0	+2	6	Advance to the quarter-finals
2	ZED	2	1	1	0	3	0	+3	4	Advance to the quarter-finals
3	Tala'ea El Gaish	1	0	1	0	0	0	0	1	
4	Al Ittihad	1	0	0	1	0	1	−1	0	
5	Zamalek	2	0	0	2	0	4	−4	0	

Updated to match(es) played on 15 November 2026. Source: EFL
Rules for classification: Group stage tiebreakers

Group B

Pos	Team	Pld	W	D	L	GF	GA	GD	Pts	Qualification
1	Pyramids	2	2	0	0	4	2	+2	6	Advance to the quarter-finals
2	Modern Sport	2	1	0	1	2	1	+1	3	Advance to the quarter-finals
3	Olympic El Qanah	2	1	0	1	3	3	0	3	
4	Smouha	1	0	0	1	0	1	−1	0	
5	National Bank	1	0	0	1	0	2	−2	0	

Updated to match(es) played on 15 November 2026. Source: EFL
Rules for classification: Group stage tiebreakers

Group C

Pos	Team	Pld	W	D	L	GF	GA	GD	Pts	Qualification
1	Al Ahly	2	2	0	0	6	0	+6	6	Advance to the quarter-finals
2	Al Mokawloon Al Arab	2	1	0	1	2	1	+1	3	Advance to the quarter-finals
3	Sharkia Enppi	1	0	1	0	0	0	0	1	
4	Asyut Petroleum	2	0	1	1	0	5	−5	1	
5	El Gouna	1	0	0	1	0	2	−2	0	

Updated to match(es) played on 15 November 2026. Source: EFL
Rules for classification: Group stage tiebreakers

Group D

Pos	Team	Pld	W	D	L	GF	GA	GD	Pts	Qualification
1	Al Masry	2	1	1	0	1	0	+1	4	Advance to the quarter-finals
2	Ceramica Cleopatra	2	1	0	1	2	1	+1	3	Advance to the quarter-finals
3	Ghazl Al Mahalla	1	0	1	0	1	1	0	1	
4	Suez Petrojet	1	0	1	0	0	0	0	1	
5	Abou Qir	2	0	1	1	1	3	−2	1	

Updated to match(es) played on 15 November 2026. Source: EFL
Rules for classification: Group stage tiebreakers

=== Egyptian Super Cup ===
The four places are filled: Zamalek (league champions), Pyramids (Egypt Cup holders), Al Masry (League Cup winners) and Al Ahly ("golden card"), and the venue and date were unconfirmed; the tournament may move to late December 2026 or early January 2027, with the UAE a possible host.

==== Semi-finals ====
Al Ahly	v	Pyramids

Zamalek	v	Al Masry

==== Third place match ====
Loser SF 1	v	Loser SF 2

==== Final ====
Winner SF 1	v	Winner SF 2
