= Vidiye Tshimanga =

Congolese politician (born 1977)

Vidiye Tshipanda Tshimanga

Special Advisor in charge of Strategic Issues
- Incumbent
- Assumed office 7 March 2019

Personal details
- Born: Vidiye Tshipanda Tshimanga; 19 April 1977 (age 49)
- Party: Dynamique Congo Unis (DCU)

Vidiye Tshipanda Tshimanga (born 19 April 1977 in Zaire) is a Congolese politician and businessman. He served as Special Advisor in charge of Strategic Issues in the cabinet of President Felix Tshisekedi Tshilombo.

== Biography ==
=== Early life ===
Vidiye Tshipanda Tshimanga was born to a Belgian mother and a Congolese father, Tshimanga Belebele Boni, a lawyer, politician and businessman. It is said that he studied in Belgium, but the location is unknown.

=== Political career ===
On 19 April 2015, Vidiye Tshipanda Tshimanga founded his political party called Dynamique Congo Unis (DCU), whose motto is to promote unity, work and equality. He serves as the party's president.

In Belgium in 2016, as vice-president of Alternative 2016, a political opposition group, Tshimanga participated in the creation of a new opposition coalition called the Rassemblement. The coalition was led by renowned opposition leader Etienne Tshisekedi wa Mulumba, who, after his death, was replaced by his son Felix Tshisekedi. The coalition aimed to prevent former president Joseph Kabila from seeking a third term. Tshimanga was among the members of the coalition’s Council of Elders.

A close friend of Felix Tshisekedi, he was appointed in 2018 by Tshisekedi—then president of the Union for Democracy and Social Progress (UDPS)—as his spokesperson for the 2018 presidential campaign.

On 15 February 2019, he withdrew his candidacy for the senatorial election, citing what he described as corruption by certain provincial deputies from Kinshasa who allegedly demanded between US$20,000 and US$50,000 to support his candidacy.

On 7 March 2019, Tshimanga was appointed Special Advisor in charge of Strategic Issues in the cabinet of President Felix Tshisekedi.

In September 2022, accused of attempted influence peddling and serious fraud, Tshimanga resigned from his post as strategic adviser to Félix Tshisekedi. On 23 December 2023, Tshimanga was acquitted by the Tribunal of Kinshasa/Gombe.

=== Football ===
In 2013, he succeeded Max Mayaka as president of the football team Daring Club Motema Pembe (DCMP), resigning in 2014 and being replaced by Gentiny Ngobila. In 2019, he ran again for the club’s presidency and was elected on 17 July 2019, serving until 2022.

In 2023, he became president of Aigles du Congo.
