= 2024–25 Linafoot =

Linafoot (Illicocash Ligue 1)
- Season: 2024–25
- Champions: Aigles du Congo
- All statistics correct as of 15 August 2024.

The 2024–25 Linafoot is the 64th season of the Linafoot, the top-tier football league in the Democratic Republic of the Congo, since its establishment in 1958.

TP Mazembe are the defending champions. Mazembe drew an average home league attendance of 10,471 in the 2024–25 Linafoot edition, the highest in the league.

== Regular season ==
=== Group A ===
==== League Table ====
Pos	Team	Pld	W	D	L	GF	GA	GD	Pts	
1	Mazembe	22	17	2	3	45	9	+36	53	Qualification to Championship round
2	Saint-Éloi Lupopo	22	17	2	3	33	8	+25	53	Qualification to Championship round
3	Sanga Balende	22	11	4	7	24	19	+5	37	Qualification to Championship round
4	Tanganyika	22	12	0	10	34	25	+9	36	Qualification to Championship round
5	Simba	22	10	6	6	25	18	+7	36	Qualification to Championship round
6	Don Bosco	22	8	6	8	24	20	+4	30	Qualification to Championship round
7	Blessing	22	7	7	8	22	27	−5	28	Relegation to the Linafoot Ligue 2
8	Groupe Bazano	22	7	3	12	21	33	−12	24	Relegation to the Linafoot Ligue 2
9	Malole	22	5	8	9	14	26	−12	23	Relegation to the Linafoot Ligue 2
10	Tshinkunku	22	5	7	10	7	19	−12	22	Relegation to the Linafoot Ligue 2
11	Lubumbashi Sport	22	5	7	10	17	30	−13	22	Relegation to the Linafoot Ligue 2
12	Panda B52	22	1	2	19	8	40	−32	5	Relegation to the Linafoot Ligue 2

Source: soccerway.com
Rules for classification: 1) points; 2) goal difference; 3) number of goals scored

=== Group B ===
==== League table ====
Pos	Team	Pld	W	D	L	GF	GA	GD	Pts	
1	Maniema Union	19	13	4	2	32	10	+22	43	Qualification to Championship round
2	Aigles du Congo	21	12	5	4	24	12	+12	41	Qualification to Championship round
3	Rangers	21	9	7	5	25	16	+9	34	Qualification to Championship round
4	Vita Club	21	7	8	6	25	18	+7	29	Qualification to Championship round
5	Anges Verts	21	7	8	6	21	21	0	29	Qualification to Championship round
6	Motema Pembe	21	7	6	8	25	30	−5	27	Qualification to Championship round
7	Céleste	21	7	5	9	19	25	−6	26	Relegation to the Linafoot Ligue 2
8	Renaissance	21	4	9	8	18	27	−9	21	Relegation to the Linafoot Ligue 2
9	Dauphins Noirs	12	6	1	5	14	13	+1	19	Relegation to the Linafoot Ligue 2
10	Kuya Sport	21	5	4	12	18	32	−14	19	Relegation to the Linafoot Ligue 2
11	New Jak	21	3	6	12	16	29	−13	15	Relegation to the Linafoot Ligue 2
12	Bukavu Dawa	11	3	4	4	14	13	+1	13	Relegation to the Linafoot Ligue 2
13	Etoile Kivu	11	4	1	6	8	13	−5	13	Relegation to the Linafoot Ligue 2

Source: soccerway.com
Rules for classification: 1) points; 2) goal difference; 3) number of goals scored

== Championship round ==
=== League Table ===
Pos	Team	Pld	W	D	L	GF	GA	GD	Pts	Qualification or relegation
1	Aigles du Congo (C)	16	11	2	3	31	14	+17	35	Qualification for the Champions League
2	Saint-Éloi Lupopo	16	10	3	3	22	7	+15	33	Qualification for the Champions League
3	Maniema Union	16	10	2	4	24	7	+17	32	Qualification for the Confederation Cup
4	Motema Pembe	16	10	1	5	23	15	+8	31	
5	Mazembe	16	9	3	4	23	14	+9	30	
6	Don Bosco	16	8	3	5	22	14	+8	27	
7	Tanganyika	16	6	1	9	20	26	−6	19	
8	Vita Club	16	4	6	6	10	13	−3	18	
9	Simba	16	4	5	7	11	17	−6	17	
10	Rangers	16	3	6	7	20	25	−5	15	
11	Sanga Balende	16	0	6	10	6	23	−17	6	
12	Anges Verts	16	0	4	12	15	52	−37	4	

Source: soccerway.com
(C) Champions

== Attendances ==
#	Football club	Average attendance
1	TP Mazembe	10,471
2	FC Saint‑Éloi Lupopo	4,186
3	Aigles du Congo	2,631
4	FC Renaissance du Congo	1,647
5	DC Motema Pembe	1,389
6	AS Dauphins Noirs	867
7	SM Sanga Balende	773
8	AS Dragons	699
9	OC Muungano	587
10	FC Mont Bleu	518
11	CS Don Bosco	533
12	AS Maniema Union	392
