= Odeh Al-Fakhouri =

Jordanian footballer

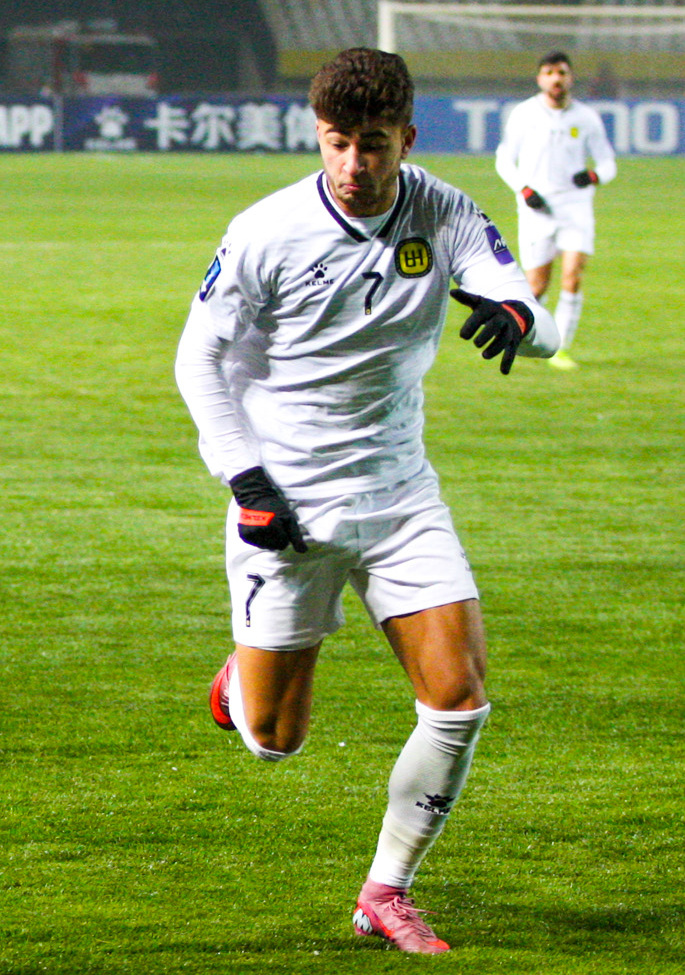
- Al-Fakhouri with Al-Hussein in 2025

Personal information
- Full name: Odeh Burhan Shehadeh Fakhoury
- Date of birth: 22 November 2005 (age 20)
- Place of birth: Amman, Jordan
- Height: 1.80 m (5 ft 11 in)
- Position: Forward

Team information
- Current team: Pyramids
- Number: 25

Youth career
- 2012–2019: Jordan Knights
- 2019: Al-Faisaly
- 2019–2023: Amman FC

Senior career*
Years	Team	Apps	(Gls)
2023–2024	Amman FC	13	(5)
2024–2026	Al-Hussein	34	(4)
2026–	Pyramids	13	(3)

International career^{‡}
2024–2025	Jordan U20	10	(7)
2025–	Jordan U23	10	(4)
2025–	Jordan	15	(1)
Medal record
Representing Jordan
Men's football
FIFA Arab Cup
Runner-up	2025 Qatar	Team
- * Club domestic league appearances and goals as of 31 August 2026 ‡ National team caps and goals as of 17 November 2026

Odeh Burhan Shehadeh Fakhoury (Arabic: عودة برهان شحادة الفاخوري; born 22 November 2005) is a Jordanian footballer who plays as a forward for Egyptian Premier League club Pyramids and the Jordan national team.

== Club career ==
=== Early career ===
Born in Amman, Al-Fakhouri began his football career through schools and youth centers funded by Prince Ali bin Al Hussein, where he was one of 8 other 6-year olds chosen to train at UE Cornellà for a short period, with the late Mahmoud El-Gohary recognizing his abilities around that time. After returning to Jordan, he joined Jordan Knights for 8-years. He also briefly joined Al-Faisaly. However, he described that period as unjustly, but also received awards for best player in two tournaments in Palestine and Qatar during that brief period.

Since then, he became a youth product of Amman FC, where he represented the club at the under-15, under-17, and under-19 levels.

=== Amman FC ===
Al-Fakhouri began playing with the first team of Jordanian First Division League side Amman FC since 2021 as a 15-year old, as he was recognized for his unique talents within the club.

In a closely-fought 2–1 loss to Jordanian Pro League side Al-Hussein during the 2023–24 Jordan FA Cup, Al-Fakhouri found himself beating a cup record, as he became the youngest goal scorer in the cup's history at 17-years old.

He had received an offer from a Cypriot club during his time at Amman FC. However, he rejected the offer.

=== Al-Hussein ===
On 15 August 2024, Al-Fakhouri agreed to permanently join Jordanian Pro League side Al-Hussein on a 3-year contract. He started with the club's B team, which participated in the 2024 Jordanian First Division League. There, he was able to score three goals in the competition.

The following season, Al-Fakhouri participated in both legs of the 2025 Jordan Super Cup, in which his club defeated Al-Wehdat. On 23 August 2025, Al-Fakhouri put in a notable performance, when he scored and assisted a goal during the club's 4–1 win against Shabab Al-Ordon. By the time the 2025–26 Jordanian Pro League went on break, Odeh had registered 4 goals in 9 appearances. On 23 December 2025, Al-Fakhouri scored two goals during the 2025–26 AFC Champions League Two campaign in Al-Hussein's 3–1 win against Ahal.

After the success his national team achieved at the 2025 FIFA Arab Cup, Al-Fakhouri gained significant interest from clubs around Egypt, as well as those around Europe. Al Ahly initially showed strong interest in the player, but despite Al-Hussein accepting the fee, Al-Fakhouri feared that he wouldn't get many opportunities at the club and stalled negotiations as a result. Pyramids then emerged as a club interested in Al-Fakhouri's services, with an increased chance of playing at a higher level, as well as a stronger financial promise.

Odeh bid farewell to Al-Hussein during the 4–0 win against Al-Jazeera, with the possibility of moving to either Al-Ahly, Pyramids, or to Europe, with the rumoured club being from the Croatian Football League.

=== Pyramids ===
On 3 February 2026, Al-Fakhouri joined Egyptian Premier League club Pyramids for an undisclosed fee. On 8 February 2026, Al-Fakhouri made his debut for the club during a CAF Champions League matchup against Rivers United, scoring a goal as a substitute and helping the club secure a 4–1 victory.

== International career ==
=== Youth career ===
Al-Fakhouri is a youth international for Jordan, beginning his international career with the Jordan national under-20 football team. During the 2025 AFC U-20 Asian Cup qualification process, he found himself among the goalscorers of a 7–0 win against Hong Kong. On that period, Al-Fakhouri gained recognition as a star within the U20 national team, after showing his consistent goal-scoring prowess.

On 28 August 2025, Al-Fakhouri was called up to the Jordan national under-23 football team for the 2026 AFC U-23 Asian Cup qualification matches against Bhutan, Chinese Taipei, and Turkmenistan on 3, 6, and 9 September 2025; respectively. He registered a total of 4 goals in 3 games.

On 23 December 2025, Al-Fakhoruri was called up to the 2026 AFC U-23 Asian Cup, participating in all four matches.

=== Senior career ===
On 2 October 2025, Al-Fakhouri received his first call-up to the Jordan national football team for the friendly matches against Bolivia and Albania on 10 and 14 October 2025; respectively. On 22 November 2025, Al-Fakhouri was called up to the senior team once again to participate in the 2025 FIFA Arab Cup. He was regarded as Jamal Sellami's "trump card" leading up to the tournament. He participated primarily as a striker during the tournament, where he had a disallowed goal against Egypt. His role grew throughout the tournament after Yazan Al-Naimat suffered an ACL injury against Iraq.

On 17 May 2026, Al-Fakhouri was named in Jordan's 30-men preliminary squad for the 2026 FIFA World Cup. He scored his first senior goal against Switzerland in a friendly match ahead of the World Cup. He participated in all three matches, and started against Austria and Argentina.

== Personal life ==
Despite both sharing a surname, Odeh is not related to Abdallah Al-Fakhouri. Odeh is also a Jordanian Christian.

== Playing style ==
Al-Fakhouri's former manager João Mota described him as a player who is strong in dribbling one-on-ones against defenders, is a quick player, and is bold in the way he plays.

== Career stats ==
=== Club ===
As of match played 3 November 2026.

Appearances and goals by club, season and competition
Club	Season	League			National cup (Note: Includes Jordan FA Cup and Egypt Cup.)		League cup (Note: Includes Jordan Super Cup and Egyptian League Cup.)		Continental (Note: Includes AFC Champions League Two and CAF Champions League.)		Total	
Club	Season	Division	Apps	Goals	Apps	Goals	Apps	Goals	Apps	Goals	Apps	Goals
Amman FC	2023	Jordanian First Division League	13	5	1	1	—		—		14	6
Al-Hussein	2024–25	Jordanian Pro League	22	0	4	0	2	0	—		28	0
Al-Hussein	2025–26	Jordanian Pro League	12	4	2	2	—		4	2	18	8
Al-Hussein	Total		47	9	7	3	2	0	4	2	60	14
Pyramids	2025–26	Egyptian Premier League	10	1	3	0	—		4	1	17	2
Pyramids	2026–27	Egyptian Premier League	3	2	0	0	1	0	0	0	4	2
Pyramids	Total		13	3	3	0	1	0	4	1	21	4
Career total			60	12	10	3	3	0	8	3	81	18

=== International ===
As of match played 17 November 2026.

Appearances and goals by national team and year
National team	Year	Apps	Goals
Jordan U20	2025	3 (Note: Appearances in the 2025 AFC U-20 Asian Cup.)	0
Jordan U23	2025	13 (Note: Two appearances in the 2025 WAFF U-23 Championship and three appearances in the 2026 AFC U-23 Asian Cup qualification.)	6
Jordan U23	2026	5 (Note: Four appearances in the 2026 AFC U-23 Asian Cup.)	1
Jordan	2025	6 (Note: Four appearances in the 2025 FIFA Arab Cup.)	0
Jordan	2026	9 (Note: Three appearances in the 2026 FIFA World Cup.)	1
Jordan	Total	15	1
Total		31	8

Scores and results list Jordan's goal tally first.

List of international goals scored by Odeh Al-Fakhouri
No.	Date	Venue	Cap	Opponent	Score	Result	Competition
1.	31 May 2026	Kybunpark, St. Gallen, Switzerland	8	Switzerland	3–1	4–1	Friendly

== Honours ==
Al-Hussein

- Jordanian Pro League: 2024–25
- Jordan Super Cup: 2025
- Jordan FA Cup runner-up: 2024–25

Pyramids

- Egypt Cup: 2025–26

Jordan U23

- WAFF U-23 Championship runner-up: 2025

Jordan

- FIFA Arab Cup runner-up: 2025
