= 2026–27 CAF Champions League =

63rd season of the CAF Champions League

TotalEnergies CAF Champions League 2026–2027

Tournament details
- Dates: Qualification: 4 September – 25 October 2026; Competition proper: 27 November 2026 – 31 May 2027
- Teams: 64 (initially registered) (from 52 associations)
- All statistics correct as of 27 July 2026. (Note: All statistics do not include qualifying rounds)

The 2026–27 CAF Champions League, officially the TotalEnergies CAF Champions League for sponsorship purposes, will be the 63rd season of Africa's premier football club tournament organized by the Confederation of African Football (CAF), and the 31st season under the CAF Champions League title.

Mamelodi Sundowns were the defending champions, having defeated AS FAR 2–1 on aggregate in the 2026 final to win their second continental title, but were eliminated by Wiliete in the second qualifying round.

The winners of the competition will automatically qualify for the 2027–28 CAF Champions League, and will earn the right to play against the winners of the 2026–27 CAF Confederation Cup in the 2027 CAF Super Cup. They will also qualify for the 2027 FIFA Intercontinental Cup and are expected to qualify for the 2029 FIFA Club World Cup, subject to the final qualification regulations issued by FIFA.

== Association team allocation ==
All 56 CAF member associations may enter the CAF Champions League. The 12 highest-ranked associations according to the CAF 5-year ranking are eligible to enter two teams in the competition.

The reigning CAF Champions League title holders are also automatically entitled to enter the following edition. However, no association may normally be represented by more than two clubs. As a result, a maximum of 68 teams could theoretically enter the tournament, although this number has never been reached.

For the 2026–27 edition, CAF used the 2021–2026 CAF 5-year ranking. The ranking calculated points for each association based on its clubs' performances in the CAF Champions League and the CAF Confederation Cup during the previous five seasons.

The points awarded for each stage were as follows:

	CAF Champions League	CAF Confederation Cup
Winners	6 points	5 points
Runners-up	5 points	4 points
Losing semi-finalists	4 points	3 points
Losing quarter-finalists	3 points	2 points
Third place in group	2 points	1 point
Fourth place in group	1 point	0.5 point

The points were multiplied by a coefficient according to the season as follows:

- 2025–26: × 5
- 2024–25: × 4
- 2023–24: × 3
- 2022–23: × 2
- 2021–22: × 1

The twelve associations eligible to enter two clubs were Egypt, Morocco, Algeria, South Africa, Tanzania, Tunisia, Angola, the Democratic Republic of the Congo, Sudan, Mali, Ivory Coast and Nigeria.

== Teams ==
CAF initially confirmed 61 teams from 48 associations for the competition.

- Bold received a bye to the second round.
- The other teams entered the first round.

Associations are shown according to their CAF 5-year ranking. Associations with a ranking score have their position and points indicated in parentheses.

Associations eligible to enter two teams
Association	Rank (Pts)	Team	Qualification method
Egypt	1 (190)	Zamalek	2025–26 Egyptian Premier League champions
Egypt	1 (190)	Pyramids	2025–26 Egyptian Premier League runners-up
Morocco	2 (162)	MAS Fes	2025–26 Botola Pro champions
Morocco	2 (162)	RS Berkane	2025–26 Botola Pro runners-up
Algeria	3 (140)	MC Alger	2025–26 Algerian Ligue Professionnelle 1 champions
Algeria	3 (140)	JS Saoura	2025–26 Algerian Ligue Professionnelle 1 runners-up
South Africa	4 (127.5)	Orlando Pirates	2025–26 South African Premiership champions
South Africa	4 (127.5)	Mamelodi Sundowns	2025–26 CAF Champions League champions 2025–26 South African Premiership runners-up
Tanzania	5 (80.5)	Young Africans	2025–26 Tanzanian Premier League champions
Tanzania	5 (80.5)	Simba	2025–26 Tanzanian Premier League runners-up
Tunisia	6 (73)	Club Africain	2025–26 Tunisian Ligue Professionnelle 1 champions
Tunisia	6 (73)	Espérance de Tunis	2025–26 Tunisian Ligue Professionnelle 1 runners-up
Angola	7 (48.5)	Petro de Luanda	2025–26 Girabola champions
Angola	7 (48.5)	Wiliete	2025–26 Girabola runners-up
DR Congo	8 (44)	TP Mazembe	2025–26 Linafoot champions
DR Congo	8 (44)	Aigles du Congo	2025–26 Linafoot runners-up
Sudan	9 (42)	Al Hilal	2025–26 Sudan Premier League champions
Sudan	9 (42)	Al Merrikh	2025–26 Sudan Premier League runners-up
Mali	10 (34)	Djoliba	2025–26 Malian Première Division champions
Mali	10 (34)	Stade Malien	2025–26 Malian Première Division runners-up
Ivory Coast	11 (30.5)	ASEC Mimosas	2025–26 Côte d'Ivoire Ligue 1 champions
Ivory Coast	11 (30.5)	San Pedro	2025–26 Côte d'Ivoire Ligue 1 runners-up
Nigeria	12 (19)	Rangers International	2025–26 Nigeria Premier Football League champions
Nigeria	12 (19)	Rivers United	2025–26 Nigeria Premier Football League runners-up

Associations eligible to enter one team
Association	Rank (Pts)	Team	Qualification method
Libya	13 (15)	Swehly	2025–26 Libyan Premier League champions
Zambia	15 (13)	Power Dynamos	2025–26 Zambia Super League champions
Ghana	16 (12)	Medeama	2025–26 Ghana Premier League champions
Guinea	17 (6.5)	Horoya	2025–26 Guinée Championnat National champions
Botswana	18 (6)	Gaborone United	2025–26 Botswana Premier League champions
Mauritania	18 (6)	FC Nouadhibou	2025–26 Super D1 champions
Senegal	20 (4)	Teungueth FC	2025–26 Ligue 1 champions
Kenya	21 (2.5)	Gor Mahia	2025–26 Kenyan Premier League champions
Cameroon	21 (2.5)	Colombe Sportive	2025–26 Elite One champions
Mozambique	23 (2)	UD Songo	2025 Moçambola champions
Togo	23 (2)	ASCK	2025–26 Togolese Championnat National champions
Uganda	23 (2)	Vipers	2025–26 Uganda Premier League champions
Eswatini	26 (0.5)	Nsingizini Hotspurs	2025–26 Premier League of Eswatini champions
Niger	26 (0.5)	ASN Nigelec	2025–26 Super Ligue champions
Benin	—	AS Sobemap	2025–26 Benin Premier League champions
Burundi	—	Aigle Noir	2025–26 Burundi Ligue A champions
Burkina Faso	—	Rahimo	2025–26 Burkinabé Premier League champions
Chad	—	Aiglons N'Djamena	Chadian Football Federation entrant
Comoros	—	Fomboni	2025–26 Comoros Premier League champions
Djibouti	—	AS Port	2025–26 Djibouti Premier League champions
Equatorial Guinea	—	15 de Agosto	2025–26 Equatoguinean Primera División champions
Ethiopia	—	Sidaama Buna	2025–26 Ethiopian Premier League champions
Gabon	—	Mangasport	2025–26 Gabon Championnat National D1 champions
Gambia	—	Medina United	2025–26 GFA League First Division champions
Guinea-Bissau	—	Canchungo	2025–26 Campeonato Nacional da Guiné-Bissau champions
Lesotho	—	Lijabatho	2025–26 Lesotho Premier League champions
Madagascar	—	CFFA	2025–26 Malagasy Pro League champions
Malawi	—	Mighty Wanderers	2025 Super League of Malawi champions
Mauritius	—	La Cure Waves	2025–26 Mauritian Premier League champions
Namibia	—	African Stars	2025–26 Namibia Premiership champions
Rwanda	—	APR	2025–26 Rwanda Premier League champions
Seychelles	—	Foresters	2025–26 Seychelles Premier League champions
Sierra Leone	—	Star Sport Academy	2025–26 Sierra Leone National Premier League runners-up
Somalia	—	Heegan	Somali Football Federation entrant
South Sudan	—	El Merreikh Bentiu	2025–26 South Sudan Premier League champions
Zanzibar	—	KVZ FC	2025–26 Zanzibar Premier League champions
Zimbabwe	—	Scottland	2025 Zimbabwe Premier Soccer League champions

Associations which did not enter a team

- Cape Verde
- Central African Republic
- Congo
- Eritrea
- Liberia
- Réunion
- São Tomé and Príncipe

== Schedule ==
CAF announced the competition calendar on 2 July 2026.

The exact dates of the final and the dates of the qualifying and group-stage draws had not been announced as of 27 July 2026.

Phase	Round	Draw date	First leg	Second leg
Qualifying rounds	First round	6 August 2026	4–6 September 2026	11–13 September 2026
Qualifying rounds	Second round	6 August 2026	16–18 October 2026	23–25 October 2026
Group stage	Matchday 1	28 October 2026	27–29 November 2026	
Group stage	Matchday 2	28 October 2026	4–6 December 2026	
Group stage	Matchday 3	28 October 2026	18–20 December 2026	
Group stage	Matchday 4	28 October 2026	8–10 January 2027	
Group stage	Matchday 5	28 October 2026	15–17 January 2027	
Group stage	Matchday 6	28 October 2026	22–24 January 2027	
Knockout stage	Quarter-finals	To be confirmed	26–28 February 2027	5–7 March 2027
Knockout stage	Semi-finals	To be confirmed	9–11 April 2027	16–18 April 2027
Knockout stage	Final	To be confirmed	9–31 May 2027 (exact dates to be confirmed)	

== Qualifying rounds ==
The draw for the qualifying rounds was held on 6 August 2026, 12:00 GMT (15:00 local time, UTC+3), at the CAF headquarters in Cairo, Egypt. In the qualifying rounds, each tie will be played on a home-and-away two-legged basis. If the aggregate score will be tied after the second leg, the away goals rule will be applied, and if still tied, extra time will not be played, and a penalty shoot-out will be used to determine the winner (Regulations III. 13 & 14).

=== First round ===
Team 1	Agg.	Team 2	1st leg	2nd leg
Wiliete (Angola)	5–0	(Seychelles) Foresters	4–0	1–0
Scottland (Zimbabwe)	1–0	(Eswatini) Nsingizini Hotspurs	1–0	0–0
UD Songo (Mozambique)	2–3	(Angola) Petro de Luanda	0–1	2–2
Mangasport (Gabon)	3–3 (a)	(Namibia) African Stars	3–1	0–2
La Cure Waves (Mauritius)	1–3	(South Africa) Orlando Pirates	0–0	1–3
15 de Agosto (Equatorial Guinea)	5–0	(Comoros) Fomboni	4–0	1–0
Mighty Wanderers (Malawi)	1–7	(Tanzania) Simba	0–1	1–6
CFFA (Madagascar)	3–1	(Lesotho) Lijabatho	2–0	1–1
Gaborone United (Botswana)	2–3	(Tanzania) Young Africans	1–1	1–2
Asswehly (Libya)	4–0	(Zanzibar) KVZ FC	1–0	3–0
Aigles du Congo (Democratic Republic of the Congo)	1–3	(Rwanda) APR	1–0	0–3
AS Port (Djibouti)	1–6	(Egypt) Zamalek	1–2	0–4
El Merriekh Bentiu (South Sudan)	4–0	(Somalia) Heegan	1–0	3–0
Gor Mahia (Kenya)	1–7	(Egypt) Pyramids	0–2	1–5
Aiglons (Chad)	0–3	(Ethiopia) Sidama	0–0	0–3
Aigle Noir (Burundi)	0–3	(Sudan) Al Hilal	0–2	0–1
Star Sport Academy (Sierra Leone)	1–1 (a)	(The Gambia) Medina United	0–0	1–1
Maghreb Fez (Morocco)	4–1	(Burkina Faso) Rahimo	4–1	0–0
ASC Kara (Togo)	2–3	(Ivory Coast) ASEC Mimosas	1–1	1–2
Canchungo (Guinea-Bissau)	0–2	(Senegal) Teungueth	0–1	0–1
Colombe Sportive (Cameroon)	0–0 (4–3 p)	(Mali) Stade Malien	0–0	0–0
Rangers (Nigeria)	2–2 (5–4 p)	(Benin) Sobemap	1–1	1–1
ASN Nigelec (Niger)	0–5	(Algeria) MC Alger	0–0	0–5
San Pédro (Ivory Coast)	3–3 (a)	(Nigeria) Rivers United	1–1	2–2
Vipers (Uganda)	1–1 (a)	(Mauritania) Nouadhibou	1–1	0–0
JS Saoura (Algeria)	2–3	(Guinea) Horoya	1–0	1–3
Al Merrikh (Sudan)	2–0	(Zambia) Power Dynamos	1–0	1–0
Medeama (Ghana)	1–4	(Democratic Republic of the Congo) TP Mazembe	0–1	1–3
Club Africain (Tunisia)	3–2	(Mali) Djoliba	1–0	2–2

=== Second round ===
The 16 winners of the second round will advance to the group stage.

Team 1	Agg.	Team 2	1st leg	2nd leg
Wiliete (Angola)	1–1 (a)	(South Africa) Mamelodi Sundowns	0–0	1–1
Scottland (Zimbabwe)	2–3	(Angola) Petro de Luanda	2–0	0–3
African Stars (Namibia)	0–5	(South Africa) Orlando Pirates	0–1	0–4
15 de Agosto (Equatorial Guinea)	1–9	(Tanzania) Simba	1–6	0–3
CFFA (Madagascar)	1–8	(Tanzania) Young Africans	0–4	1–4
Asswehly (Libya)	1–1 (1–3 p)	(Tunisia) Espérance de Tunis	1–0	0–1
APR (Rwanda)	0–2	(Egypt) Zamalek	0–1	0–1
El Merriekh Bentiu (South Sudan)	0–5	(Egypt) Pyramids	0–1	0–4
Sidama (Ethiopia)	0–4	(Sudan) Al Hilal	0–2	0–2
Star Sport Academy (Sierra Leone)	0–3	(Morocco) RS Berkane	0–2	0–1
Maghreb Fez (Morocco)	3–2	(Ivory Coast) ASEC Mimosas	1–1	2–1
Teungueth (Senegal)	0–3	(Cameroon) Colombe Sportive	0–2	0–1
Rangers (Nigeria)	2–3	(Algeria) MC Alger	2–0	0–3
San Pédro (Ivory Coast)	2–3	(Mauritania) Nouadhibou	2–1	0–2
Horoya (Guinea)	1–1 (5–3 p)	(Sudan) Al Merrikh	1–0	0–1
TP Mazembe (Democratic Republic of the Congo)	1–2	(Tunisia) Club Africain	1–1	0–1

== Group stage ==
The draw for the group stage will be held on 28 October 2026, 12:00 GMT (15:00 local time, UTC+3), at the Egyptian Football Association headquarters in Cairo, Egypt. The 16 winners of the second round of qualifying rounds will be drawn into four groups of four.

The teams were seeded by their performances in the CAF competitions for the previous five seasons (CAF 5-year ranking points shown next to every team). Each group will contain one team from each of Pot 1, Pot 2, Pot 3, and Pot 4, and each team will be allocated to the positions in their group according to their pot.

Pot 1
Team	Pts
(Tunisia) Espérance de Tunis	58
(Morocco) RS Berkane	57
(Egypt) Pyramids	49
(Egypt) Zamalek	48

Pot 2
Team	Pts
(Sudan) Al Hilal	39
(Tanzania) Simba	38
(Tanzania) Young Africans	35
(Angola) Petro de Luanda	27

Pot 3
Team	Pts
(Algeria) MC Alger	22
(South Africa) Orlando Pirates	20
(Mauritania) Nouadhibou	6
(Guinea) Horoya AC	5

Pot 4
Team	Pts
(Tunisia) Club Africain	3
(Angola) Wiliete	—
(Cameroon) Colombe Sportive	—
(Morocco) Maghreb Fez	—

=== Group A ===
Pos	Team	Pld	W	D	L	GF	GA	GD	Pts	Qualification	A1	A2	A3	A4
1	A1	0	0	0	0	0	0	0	0	Advance to knockout stage	—	18–20 Dec	22–24 Jan	27–29 Nov
2	A2	0	0	0	0	0	0	0	0	Advance to knockout stage	8–10 Jan	—	27–29 Nov	22–24 Jan
3	A3	0	0	0	0	0	0	0	0		4–6 Dec	15–17 Jan	—	8–10 Jan
4	A4	0	0	0	0	0	0	0	0		15–17 Jan	4–6 Dec	18–20 Dec	—

First match(es) will be played: 27–29 November 2026. Source: CAF
Rules for classification: Group stage tiebreakers

=== Group B ===
Pos	Team	Pld	W	D	L	GF	GA	GD	Pts	Qualification	B1	B2	B3	B4
1	B1	0	0	0	0	0	0	0	0	Advance to knockout stage	—	18–20 Dec	22–24 Jan	27–29 Nov
2	B2	0	0	0	0	0	0	0	0	Advance to knockout stage	8–10 Jan	—	27–29 Nov	22–24 Jan
3	B3	0	0	0	0	0	0	0	0		4–6 Dec	15–17 Jan	—	8–10 Jan
4	B4	0	0	0	0	0	0	0	0		15–17 Jan	4–6 Dec	18–20 Dec	—

First match(es) will be played: 27–29 November 2026. Source: CAF

=== Group C ===
Pos	Team	Pld	W	D	L	GF	GA	GD	Pts	Qualification	C1	C2	C3	C4
1	C1	0	0	0	0	0	0	0	0	Advance to knockout stage	—	18–20 Dec	22–24 Jan	27–29 Nov
2	C2	0	0	0	0	0	0	0	0	Advance to knockout stage	8–10 Jan	—	27–29 Nov	22–24 Jan
3	C3	0	0	0	0	0	0	0	0		4–6 Dec	15–17 Jan	—	8–10 Jan
4	C4	0	0	0	0	0	0	0	0		15–17 Jan	4–6 Dec	18–20 Dec	—

First match(es) will be played: 27–29 November 2026. Source: CAF

=== Group D ===
Pos	Team	Pld	W	D	L	GF	GA	GD	Pts	Qualification	D1	D2	D3	D4
1	D1	0	0	0	0	0	0	0	0	Advance to knockout stage	—	18–20 Dec	22–24 Jan	27–29 Nov
2	D2	0	0	0	0	0	0	0	0	Advance to knockout stage	8–10 Jan	—	27–29 Nov	22–24 Jan
3	D3	0	0	0	0	0	0	0	0		4–6 Dec	15–17 Jan	—	8–10 Jan
4	D4	0	0	0	0	0	0	0	0		15–17 Jan	4–6 Dec	18–20 Dec	—

First match(es) will be played: 27–29 November 2026. Source: CAF

== See also ==
- 2026–27 CAF Confederation Cup
