= Hazem Gamal =

Egyptian footballer (born 2005)

Hazem Gamal Mahmoud Aly (Arabic: حازم جمال; born 9 January 2005) is an Egyptian professional footballer who plays as a goalkeeper for Egyptian Premier League club Pyramids and the Egypt U23.

== Honors and achievements ==
Al Ahly

- Egyptian Premier League: 2023–24
- CAF Champions League: 2023–24
