= Tarek Alaa =

Tarek Alaa may refer to:

- Tarek Alaa (footballer, born 2002), Egyptian footballer
- Tarek Alaa (footballer, born 2003), Egyptian footballer

== See also ==
- Ala (name)
