= Aloisi Masella =

Aloisi Masella can refer to two Italian cardinals:

- Benedetto Aloisi Masella (1879-1970), Chamberlain of the Holy Roman Church from 1958 to 1970
- Gaetano Aloisi Masella (1826-1902), Prefect of the Congregation of Rites from 1899 to 1902
