= Mohamed Atef =

Egyptian footballer (born 2002)

Personal information
- Full name: Mohamed Atef
- Date of birth: 23 August 2002 (age 24)
- Position: Forward

Team information
- Current team: Tala'ea El Gaish SC

Senior career*
Years	Team	Apps	(Gls)
2020–2024	Tanta SC		
2024–	Zamalek		
2025–	→ Tala'ea El Gaish SC (loan)	0	(0)
- * Club domestic league appearances and goals

Mohamed Atef (Egyptian Arabic: محمد عاطف; born 23 August 2002) is an Egyptian professional footballer who plays as a forward for Egyptian Premier League club Tala'ea El Gaish SC on loan from Zamalek.

== Honours ==
Zamalek

- Egypt Cup: 2024–25
- CAF Super Cup: 2024
