= Alozie =

Surname list

- Gender: Male
- Language(s): Igbo

Origin
- Word/name: Nigeria

Alozie audiois a Nigerian surname of Igbo origin.

== Notable people with the surname include ==
- Anthony Alozie (born 1986), Australian track and field sprinter
- Glory Alozie (born 1977), Nigerian-Spanish Athlete
- Munachim Alozie, Nigerian politician
- Michael Alozie, Nigerian musician otherwise known as Snazzy the Optimist
- Mitchelle Alozie (born 1997), American-Nigerian professional footballer
- Michael Chidi Alozie (born 1986), Nigerian professional footballer
- Okezie Alozie (born 1993), American footballer
- Alex Alozie, United Bank for Africa executive director
