= Aigles du Congo =

Les Aigles du Congo
- Full name: Football Club Les Aigles du Congo
- Nickname: Les Samouraïs (The Samurais)
- Founded: 21 August 2023; 3 years ago
- Ground: Stade des Martyrs, Kinshasa
- Capacity: 80,000
- Owner: Vidiye Tshimanga
- Chairman: Vidiye Tshimanga
- Manager: Papy Mpoyi
- League: Linafoot
- 2025–26: 2nd
| Home colours colours | Away colours colours |

Football Club Les Aigles du Congo, commonly referred to as Les Aigles du Congo, is a Congolese professional football club based in Kinshasa, Democratic Republic of the Congo. The club was founded in 2023.

== History ==
In August 2023, businessman and politician Vidiye Tshimanga purchased the top-flight Linafoot licence of Jeunesse Sportive de Kinshasa. During a press conference held on 21 August 2023, he announced that Les Aigles du Congo would be a multi-sport club and would not be considered a continuation of JS Kinshasa.

In the 2024–25 season, the club won its first national championship title.

== Honours ==
- Linafoot
  - Champions (1): 2024–25

== Managers ==
- 21 August 2023 – September 2023: Eric Tshibasu
- September 2023 – present: Anicet Kiazayidi

== Notable players ==
- Heltone Kayembe Mujanayi
- David Bela Bakwayima
- Pael Mbataba

== See also ==
- Football in the Democratic Republic of the Congo
