= 2026–27 CAF Champions League group stage =

International football competition

- Dates: 27 November 2026 – 24 January 2027

The 2026–27 CAF Champions League group stage will begin on 27 November 2026 and end on 24 January 2027. 16 teams will compete in the group stage to decide the eight places in the knockout stage of the 2026–27 CAF Champions League.

== Draw ==
The draw for the group stage was held on 28 October 2026, 12:00 GMT (15:00 local time, UTC+3), at the Egyptian Football Association headquarters in Cairo, Egypt. The 16 winners of the second round of qualifying rounds were drawn into four groups of four.

The teams were seeded by their performances in the CAF competitions for the previous five seasons (CAF 5-year ranking points shown next to every team). Each group contains one team from each of Pot 1, Pot 2, Pot 3, and Pot 4, and each team was allocated to the positions in their group according to their pot.

Pot 1
Team	Pts
(Tunisia) Espérance de Tunis	58
(Morocco) RS Berkane	57
(Egypt) Pyramids	49
(Egypt) Zamalek	48

Pot 2
Team	Pts
(Sudan) Al Hilal	39
(Tanzania) Simba	38
(Tanzania) Young Africans	35
(Angola) Petro de Luanda	27

Pot 3
Team	Pts
(Algeria) MC Alger	22
(South Africa) Orlando Pirates	20
(Mauritania) Nouadhibou	6
(Guinea) Horoya AC	5

Pot 4
Team	Pts
(Tunisia) Club Africain	3
(Angola) Wiliete	—
(Cameroon) Colombe Sportive	—
(Morocco) Maghreb Fez	—

== Format ==
In the group stage, each group will be played on a home-and-away round-robin basis. The winners and runners-up of each group will advance to the quarter-finals of the knockout stage.

=== Tiebreakers ===
The teams will be ranked according to points (3 points for a win, 1 point for a draw, 0 points for a loss). If tied on points, tiebreakers will be applied in the following order (Regulations III. 20 & 21):

1. Points in head-to-head matches among tied teams;
2. Goal difference in head-to-head matches among tied teams;
3. Goals scored in head-to-head matches among tied teams;
4. Away goals scored in head-to-head matches among tied teams;
5. If more than two teams are tied, and after applying all head-to-head criteria above, a subset of teams will still be tied, all head-to-head criteria above will be reapplied exclusively to this subset of teams;
6. Goal difference in all group matches;
7. Goals scored in all group matches;
8. Away goals scored in all group matches;
9. Drawing of lots.

== Schedule ==
The schedule of each matchday will be as follows.

Matchday	Dates	Matches
Matchday 1	27–29 November 2026	Team 1 vs. Team 4, Team 2 vs. Team 3
Matchday 2	4–6 December 2026	Team 3 vs. Team 1, Team 4 vs. Team 2
Matchday 3	18–20 December 2026	Team 4 vs. Team 3, Team 1 vs. Team 2
Matchday 4	8–10 January 2027	Team 3 vs. Team 4, Team 2 vs. Team 1
Matchday 5	15–17 January 2027	Team 4 vs. Team 1, Team 3 vs. Team 2
Matchday 6	22–24 January 2027	Team 1 vs. Team 3, Team 2 vs. Team 4

== Groups ==
All times are local.

=== Group A ===
Pos	Team	Pld	W	D	L	GF	GA	GD	Pts	Qualification	EST	APL	FCN	WSC
1	(Tunisia) Espérance de Tunis	0	0	0	0	0	0	0	0	Advance to knockout stage	—	18–20 Dec	22–24 Jan	28 Nov
2	(Angola) Petro de Luanda	0	0	0	0	0	0	0	0	Advance to knockout stage	8–10 Jan	—	29 Nov	22–24 Jan
3	(Mauritania) Nouadhibou	0	0	0	0	0	0	0	0		6 Dec	15–17 Jan	—	8–10 Jan
4	(Angola) Wiliete	0	0	0	0	0	0	0	0		15–17 Jan	6 Dec	18–20 Dec	—

First match(es) will be played: 28 November 2026. Source: CAF
Rules for classification: Group stage tiebreakers
28 November 2026
17:00 UTC+1

Espérance de Tunis (Tunisia)	v	(Angola) Wiliete
	Report

Hammadi Agrebi Stadium, Tunis
Referee: Omar Artan (Somalia)
29 November 2026
17:00 UTC+1

Petro de Luanda (Angola)	v	(Mauritania) Nouadhibou
	Report

11 November Stadium, Luanda

6 December 2026
17:00 UTC+1

Wiliete (Angola)	v	(Angola) Petro de Luanda
	Report

11 November Stadium, Luanda
6 December 2026
19:00 UTC+0

Nouadhibou (Mauritania)	v	(Tunisia) Espérance de Tunis
	Report

Nouakchott Olympic Stadium, Nouakchott

18–20 December 2026
--:-- UTC+1

Wiliete (Angola)	v	(Mauritania) Nouadhibou
	Report

11 November Stadium, Luanda
18–20 December 2026
--:-- UTC+1

Espérance de Tunis (Tunisia)	v	(Angola) Petro de Luanda
	Report

Hammadi Agrebi Stadium, Tunis

8–10 January 2027
--:-- UTC+0

Nouadhibou (Mauritania)	v	(Angola) Wiliete
	Report

Nouakchott Olympic Stadium, Nouakchott
8–10 January 2027
--:-- UTC+1

Petro de Luanda (Angola)	v	(Tunisia) Espérance de Tunis
	Report

11 November Stadium, Luanda

15–17 January 2027
--:-- UTC+1

Wiliete (Angola)	v	(Tunisia) Espérance de Tunis
	Report

11 November Stadium, Luanda
15–17 January 2027
--:-- UTC+0

Nouadhibou (Mauritania)	v	(Angola) Petro de Luanda
	Report

Nouakchott Olympic Stadium, Nouakchott

22–24 January 2027
--:-- UTC+1

Espérance de Tunis (Tunisia)	v	(Mauritania) Nouadhibou
	Report

Hammadi Agrebi Stadium, Tunis
22–24 January 2027
--:-- UTC+1

Petro de Luanda (Angola)	v	(Angola) Wiliete
	Report

11 November Stadium, Luanda

=== Group B ===
Pos	Team	Pld	W	D	L	GF	GA	GD	Pts	Qualification	ZAM	YNG	MCA	CA
1	(Egypt) Zamalek	0	0	0	0	0	0	0	0	Advance to knockout stage	—	18–20 Dec	22–24 Jan	28 Nov
2	(Tanzania) Young Africans	0	0	0	0	0	0	0	0	Advance to knockout stage	8–10 Jan	—	28 Nov	22–24 Jan
3	(Algeria) MC Alger	0	0	0	0	0	0	0	0		4 Dec	15–17 Jan	—	8–10 Jan
4	(Tunisia) Club Africain	0	0	0	0	0	0	0	0		15–17 Jan	5 Dec	18–20 Dec	—

First match(es) will be played: 28 November 2026. Source: CAF
Rules for classification: Group stage tiebreakers
28 November 2026
16:00 UTC+3

Young Africans (Tanzania)	v	(Algeria) MC Alger
	Report

Chamazi Stadium, Dar es Salaam
28 November 2026
18:00 UTC+2

Zamalek (Egypt)	v	(Tunisia) Club Africain
	Report

Cairo International Stadium, Cairo
Referee: Jalal Jayed (Morocco)

4 December 2026
20:00 UTC+1

MC Alger (Algeria)	v	(Egypt) Zamalek
	Report

Ali La Pointe Stadium, Algiers
Referee: Mutaz Ibrahim (Libya)
5 December 2026
17:00 UTC+1

Club Africain (Tunisia)	v	(Tanzania) Young Africans
	Report

Hammadi Agrebi Stadium, Tunis

18–20 December 2026
--:-- UTC+1

Club Africain (Tunisia)	v	(Algeria) MC Alger
	Report

Hammadi Agrebi Stadium, Tunis
18–20 December 2026
--:-- UTC+2

Zamalek (Egypt)	v	(Tanzania) Young Africans
	Report

Cairo International Stadium, Cairo

8–10 January 2027
--:-- UTC+1

MC Alger (Algeria)	v	(Tunisia) Club Africain
	Report

Ali La Pointe Stadium, Algiers
8–10 January 2027
--:-- UTC+3

Young Africans (Tanzania)	v	(Egypt) Zamalek
	Report

Chamazi Stadium, Dar es Salaam

15–17 January 2027
--:-- UTC+1

Club Africain (Tunisia)	v	(Egypt) Zamalek
	Report

Hammadi Agrebi Stadium, Tunis
15–17 January 2027
--:-- UTC+1

MC Alger (Algeria)	v	(Tanzania) Young Africans
	Report

Ali La Pointe Stadium, Algiers

22–24 January 2027
--:-- UTC+2

Zamalek (Egypt)	v	(Algeria) MC Alger
	Report

Cairo International Stadium, Cairo
22–24 January 2027
--:-- UTC+3

Young Africans (Tanzania)	v	(Tunisia) Club Africain
	Report

Chamazi Stadium, Dar es Salaam

=== Group C ===
Pos	Team	Pld	W	D	L	GF	GA	GD	Pts	Qualification	RSB	SIM	OPFC	COL
1	(Morocco) RS Berkane	0	0	0	0	0	0	0	0	Advance to knockout stage	—	18–20 Dec	22–24 Jan	28 Nov
2	(Tanzania) Simba	0	0	0	0	0	0	0	0	Advance to knockout stage	8–10 Jan	—	29 Nov	22–24 Jan
3	(South Africa) Orlando Pirates	0	0	0	0	0	0	0	0		5 Dec	15–17 Jan	—	8–10 Jan
4	(Cameroon) Colombe Sportive	0	0	0	0	0	0	0	0		15–17 Jan	6 Dec	18–20 Dec	—

First match(es) will be played: 28 November 2026. Source: CAF
Rules for classification: Group stage tiebreakers
28 November 2026
20:00 UTC+1

RS Berkane (Morocco)	v	(Cameroon) Colombe Sportive
	Report

Berkane Municipal Stadium, Berkane
29 November 2026
16:00 UTC+3

Simba (Tanzania)	v	(South Africa) Orlando Pirates
	Report

Uhuru Stadium, Dar es Salaam

5 December 2026
15:00 UTC+2

Orlando Pirates (South Africa)	v	(Morocco) RS Berkane
	Report

Orlando Stadium, Johannesburg
6 December 2026
17:00 UTC+1

Colombe Sportive (Cameroon)	v	(Tanzania) Simba
	Report

Ahmadou Ahidjo Stadium, Yaoundé

18–20 December 2026
--:-- UTC+1

Colombe Sportive (Cameroon)	v	(South Africa) Orlando Pirates
	Report

Ahmadou Ahidjo Stadium, Yaoundé
18–20 December 2026
--:-- UTC+1

RS Berkane (Morocco)	v	(Tanzania) Simba
	Report

Berkane Municipal Stadium, Berkane

8–10 January 2027
--:-- UTC+2

Orlando Pirates (South Africa)	v	(Cameroon) Colombe Sportive
	Report

Orlando Stadium, Johannesburg
8–10 January 2027
--:-- UTC+3

Simba (Tanzania)	v	(Morocco) RS Berkane
	Report

Uhuru Stadium, Dar es Salaam

15–17 January 2027
--:-- UTC+1

Colombe Sportive (Cameroon)	v	(Morocco) RS Berkane
	Report

Ahmadou Ahidjo Stadium, Yaoundé
15–17 January 2027
--:-- UTC+2

Orlando Pirates (South Africa)	v	(Tanzania) Simba
	Report

Orlando Stadium, Johannesburg

22–24 January 2027
--:-- UTC+1

RS Berkane (Morocco)	v	(South Africa) Orlando Pirates
	Report

Berkane Municipal Stadium, Berkane
22–24 January 2027
--:-- UTC+3

Simba (Tanzania)	v	(Cameroon) Colombe Sportive
	Report

Uhuru Stadium, Dar es Salaam

=== Group D ===
Pos	Team	Pld	W	D	L	GF	GA	GD	Pts	Qualification	PYR	HIL	HAC	MAS
1	(Egypt) Pyramids	0	0	0	0	0	0	0	0	Advance to knockout stage	—	18–20 Dec	22–24 Jan	28 Nov
2	(Sudan) Al Hilal	0	0	0	0	0	0	0	0	Advance to knockout stage	8–10 Jan	—	29 Nov	22–24 Jan
3	(Guinea) Horoya AC	0	0	0	0	0	0	0	0		6 Dec	15–17 Jan	—	8–10 Jan
4	(Morocco) Maghreb Fez	0	0	0	0	0	0	0	0		15–17 Jan	5 Dec	18–20 Dec	—

First match(es) will be played: 28 November 2026. Source: CAF
Rules for classification: Group stage tiebreakers
28 November 2026
18:00 UTC+2

Pyramids (Egypt)	v	(Morocco) Maghreb Fez
	Report

30 June Stadium, Cairo
Referee: Pacifique Ndabihawenimana (Burundi)
29 November 2026
21:00 UTC+2

Al Hilal (Sudan)	v	(Guinea) Horoya AC
	Report

Amahoro Stadium, Kigali (Rwanda)

5 December 2026
20:00 UTC+1

Maghreb Fez (Morocco)	v	(Sudan) Al Hilal
	Report

Meknes Honor Stadium, Meknes
6 December 2026
16:00 UTC+0

Horoya AC (Guinea)	v	(Egypt) Pyramids
	Report

28 September Stadium, Conakry

18–20 December 2026
--:-- UTC+1

Maghreb Fez (Morocco)	v	(Guinea) Horoya AC
	Report

Meknes Honor Stadium, Meknes
18 December 2026
18:00 UTC+2

Pyramids (Egypt)	v	(Sudan) Al Hilal
	Report

30 June Stadium, Cairo

8–10 January 2027
--:-- UTC+0

Horoya AC (Guinea)	v	(Morocco) Maghreb Fez
	Report

28 September Stadium, Conakry
8 January 2027
--:-- UTC+2

Al Hilal (Sudan)	v	(Egypt) Pyramids
	Report

Amahoro Stadium, Kigali (Rwanda)

15 January 2027
--:-- UTC+1

Maghreb Fez (Morocco)	v	(Egypt) Pyramids
	Report

Meknes Honor Stadium, Meknes
15–17 January 2027
--:-- UTC+0

Horoya AC (Guinea)	v	(Sudan) Al Hilal
	Report

28 September Stadium, Conakry

22 January 2027
--:-- UTC+2

Pyramids (Egypt)	v	(Guinea) Horoya AC
	Report

30 June Stadium, Cairo
22–24 January 2027
--:-- UTC+2

Al Hilal (Sudan)	v	(Morocco) Maghreb Fez
	Report

Amahoro Stadium, Kigali (Rwanda)

== See also ==
- 2026–27 CAF Confederation Cup group stage
