= 2025 WAFF U-23 Championship squads =

The 2025 WAFF U-23 Championship was an international football tournament held in Oman from 19 to 25 March 2025. It was the sixth edition of the U-23 age group competition organized by the West Asian Football Federation.

The eight national teams involved in the tournament were required to register a squad of at most 26 players, including three goalkeepers. Only players in these squads were eligible to take part in the tournament. Players born on or after 1 January 2002 were eligible to compete in the tournament.

The full squad listings are below. The age listed for each player is on 19 March 2025, the first day of the tournament. The nationality of each club reflects the national association (not the league) to which the club is affiliated. A flag is included for coaches who are of a different nationality than their own national team.

== Group A ==
=== Oman ===
Coach: Badar Al-Maimani

The squad was announced on 6 March 2025.

No.	Pos.	Player	Date of birth (age)	Club
1	GK	Abdullah Al-Jabri	11 February 2006 (aged 19)	(Oman Football Association) Nizwa
2	MF	Samer Al-Hatmi	11 January 2003 (aged 22)	(Oman Football Association) Al-Seeb
3	MF	Sultan Al-Marzouq	21 October 2004 (aged 20)	(Oman Football Association) Dhofar
4	DF	Ziyad Al-Rabsi		(Oman Football Association) Al-Nasr
5	DF	Jawad Al-Ezzi	23 May 2005 (aged 19)	(Oman Football Association) Al-Seeb
6	MF	Ali Al-Balushi	2 May 2004 (aged 20)	(Oman Football Association) Oman
7	FW	Luqman Al-Jaddidi	13 May 2004 (aged 20)	(Oman Football Association) Al-Rustaq
8	FW	Abdulaleem Al-Rawahi	18 March 2004 (aged 21)	(Oman Football Association) Fanja
9	MF	Ahed Al-Mashaiki	30 May 2003 (aged 21)	(Oman Football Association) Al-Nahda
10	FW	Masoud Al-Bahri	22 May 2005 (aged 19)	(Oman Football Association) Al-Shabab
11	MF	Osama Beit Samir		(Oman Football Association) Al-Nasr
12	GK	Rashad Abdulhamid	19 December 2005 (aged 19)	(Oman Football Association) Al-Nasr
13	DF	Adnan Al-Mushaifri	27 May 2006 (aged 18)	(Oman Football Association) Al-Seeb
14	DF	Osama Al-Mahrooqi	7 March 2003 (aged 22)	(Oman Football Association) Al-Seeb
15	DF	Turki Beit Rabie	1 April 2004 (aged 20)	(Oman Football Association) Al-Ittihad
16	MF	Yaser Al-Balushi	2 January 2006 (aged 19)	(Oman Football Association) Sur
17	MF	Abdulhadi Al-Manwari	11 June 2006 (aged 18)	(Oman Football Association) Al-Mussanah
18	MF	Mohammed Al-Subaie	9 November 2004 (aged 20)	(Oman Football Association) Al-Rustaq
19	DF	Uday Al-Manouri	19 June 2005 (aged 19)	(Oman Football Association) Al-Salam
20	FW	Nasser Al-Saqri	9 February 2004 (aged 21)	(Oman Football Association) Al-Seeb
21	MF	Abdulaziz Al-Shaqsi	3 December 2005 (aged 19)	(Oman Football Association) Al-Rustaq
22	GK	Mazen Saleh	29 January 2003 (aged 22)	(United Arab Emirates Football Association) Al-Dhafra
23	DF	Nayef Faraj	4 November 2002 (aged 22)	(Oman Football Association) Dhofar

=== Saudi Arabia ===
Coach: (Italy) Luigi Di Biagio

The squad was announced on 17 March 2025.

No.	Pos.	Player	Date of birth (age)	Club
1	GK	Turki Baaljawsh	24 November 2003 (aged 21)	(Saudi Arabian Football Federation) Al-Ettifaq
2	DF	Ahmed Al-Julaydan	8 March 2004 (aged 21)	(Saudi Arabian Football Federation) Al-Fateh
3	DF	Mohammed Al-Dossari	31 March 2003 (aged 21)	(Saudi Arabian Football Federation) Neom
4	MF	Mohammed Baker	16 March 2002 (aged 23)	(Saudi Arabian Football Federation) Al-Jabalain
5	DF	Khalid Al-Asiri	27 November 2004 (aged 20)	(Saudi Arabian Football Federation) Al-Diriyah
6	MF	Faisal Al-Subiani	7 July 2003 (aged 21)	(Saudi Arabian Football Federation) Damac
7	FW	Hammam Al-Hammami	30 January 2004 (aged 21)	(Saudi Arabian Football Federation) Al-Kholood
8	MF	Ayman Fallatah	2 October 2003 (aged 21)	(Saudi Arabian Football Federation) Damac
9	FW	Meshari Al-Nemer	5 August 2003 (aged 21)	(Saudi Arabian Football Federation) Damac
10	MF	Abdulmalik Al-Jaber	7 January 2004 (aged 21)	(Football Association of Bosnia and Herzegovina) Željezničar
11	FW	Yaseen Al-Zubaidi	26 April 2003 (aged 21)	(Saudi Arabian Football Federation) Al-Okhdood
12	DF	Salem Al-Najdi	27 January 2003 (aged 22)	(Saudi Arabian Football Federation) Al-Nassr
13	DF	Sulaiman Hazazi	1 February 2003 (aged 22)	(Saudi Arabian Football Federation) Al-Zulfi
14	MF	Abbas Al-Hassan	22 February 2004 (aged 21)	(Saudi Arabian Football Federation) Neom
15	DF	Abdulmalik Al-Oyayari	10 December 2003 (aged 21)	(Saudi Arabian Football Federation) Neom
16	FW	Abdullah Matuq	2 April 2003 (aged 21)	(Saudi Arabian Football Federation) Al-Jandal
17	FW	Abdulkarim Darisi	18 April 2003 (aged 21)	(Saudi Arabian Football Federation) Al-Ahli
18	MF	Suhayb Al-Zaid	12 August 2004 (aged 20)	(Saudi Arabian Football Federation) Al-Fateh
20	MF	Mohammed Yousef	14 January 2003 (aged 22)	(Saudi Arabian Football Federation) Al-Ettifaq
21	GK	Osama Al-Mermesh	6 July 2003 (aged 21)	(Saudi Arabian Football Federation) Al-Ittihad
23	DF	Abdulaziz Al-Faraj	23 June 2003 (aged 21)	(Saudi Arabian Football Federation) Al-Tai
24	FW	Murad Khadhari	1 October 2003 (aged 21)	(Saudi Arabian Football Federation) Al-Wehda
25	DF	Mobarak Al-Rajeh	1 August 2003 (aged 21)	(Saudi Arabian Football Federation) Al-Raed

== Group B ==
=== Bahrain ===
Coach: (Morocco) Hicham Dmiai

The squad was announced on 13 March 2025.

No.	Pos.	Player	Date of birth (age)	Club
1	GK	Mohamed Arhama	9 June 2003 (aged 21)	(Bahrain Football Association) Hidd
2	DF	Ahmed Dheyaa	17 August 2003 (aged 21)	(Bahrain Football Association) East Riffa
3	DF	Ali Al-Enezi		(Bahrain Football Association) Al-Najma
4	DF	Ali Sanad	2 June 2005 (aged 19)	(Bahrain Football Association) Manama
5	DF	Sayed Al-Moosawi	27 March 2004 (aged 20)	(Bahrain Football Association) Al-Shabab
6	MF	Hasihim	5 July 2004 (aged 20)	(Royal Spanish Football Federation) Córdoba
7	FW	Abdulrahman Al-Khayyat		(Bahrain Football Association) East Riffa
8	MF	Salman Amin	26 June 2004 (aged 20)	(Bahrain Football Association) Hidd
9	FW	Abdulla Al-Subaiei	22 August 2004 (aged 20)	(Bahrain Football Association) Hidd
10	FW	Ali Al-Dosari	17 October 2003 (aged 21)	(Bahrain Football Association) Al-Najma
11	FW	Ali Tarada	3 February 2004 (aged 21)	(Bahrain Football Association) Al-Ahli
12	DF	Jassim Dawood	31 January 2003 (aged 22)	(Bahrain Football Association) Al-Hala
13	MF	Faisal Al-Saleh	4 June 2003 (aged 21)	(Bahrain Football Association) Sitra
14	MF	Mohamed Al-Jishi	30 June 2006 (aged 18)	(Bahrain Football Association) East Riffa
15	MF	Saud Mohsin	11 January 2006 (aged 19)	(Bahrain Football Association) East Riffa
16	MF	Khaled Al-Khalaf	14 January 2007 (aged 18)	(Bahrain Football Association) Al-Riffa
17	DF	Jamal Al-Tairi	24 March 2003 (aged 21)	(Bahrain Football Association) Al-Hala
18	MF	Ali Abdulla		
19	MF	Ramzi Abdulla		(Bahrain Football Association) Al-Muharraq
20	DF	Mahmood Mohamed	11 November 2004 (aged 20)	(Bahrain Football Association) Al-Shabab
21	GK	Abdullah Al-Ahmad	9 April 2003 (aged 21)	(Bahrain Football Association) Bahrain
22	GK	Ashraf Saleh	2 March 2005 (aged 20)	(Bahrain Football Association) Al-Hala
23	MF	Ali Sahwan	26 December 2004 (aged 20)	(Bahrain Football Association) Al-Ahli
24	MF	Bader Al-Asam		
26	MF	Ahmed Farhan		

=== United Arab Emirates ===
Coach: (Uruguay) Marcelo Broli

The squad was announced on 7 March 2025.

No.	Pos.	Player	Date of birth (age)	Club
1	GK	Saeed Maqdami		
2	DF	Mubarak Zamah	29 November 2003 (aged 21)	(United Arab Emirates Football Association) Al-Jazira
3	MF	Zayed Khamis	16 November 2004 (aged 20)	(United Arab Emirates Football Association) Al-Jazira
4	DF	Hamdan Saeed Basweidan	26 December 2006 (aged 18)	(United Arab Emirates Football Association) Shabab
5	DF	Khamis Al-Mansoori	15 January 2004 (aged 21)	(United Arab Emirates Football Association) Baniyas
6	MF	Matar Al-Shamsi	3 May 2005 (aged 19)	(United Arab Emirates Football Association) Sharjah
7	FW	Saif Salem	7 October 2003 (aged 21)	(United Arab Emirates Football Association) Hatta
8	MF	Ali Al-Blooshi		
9	FW	Eisa Khalfan	12 March 2003 (aged 22)	(United Arab Emirates Football Association) Al-Ain
10	MF	Eid Al-Hammadi	31 August 2005 (aged 19)	(United Arab Emirates Football Association) Al-Ain
11	MF	Mohammed Al-Hammadi		
12	DF	Mansour Al-Balushi	19 January 2005 (aged 20)	(United Arab Emirates Football Association) Al-Ain
13	MF	Youssef Al-Marzooqi	7 March 2005 (aged 20)	(United Arab Emirates Football Association) Al-Jazira
14	DF	Solomon Sosu	5 March 2005 (aged 20)	(United Arab Emirates Football Association) Al-Ain
16	FW	Junior Ndiaye	29 March 2005 (aged 19)	(French Football Federation) Montpellier
17	GK	Adli Mohamed	25 June 2005 (aged 19)	(The Football Association) Southampton
18	FW	Mansoor Al-Menhali	29 March 2003 (aged 21)	(United Arab Emirates Football Association) Al-Wahda
19	MF	Mayed Al-Awani	6 May 2003 (aged 21)	(United Arab Emirates Football Association) Sharjah
20	MF	Saif Al-Menhali	1 February 2003 (aged 22)	(United Arab Emirates Football Association) Baniyas
21	FW	Hazem Mohammad	18 March 2005 (aged 20)	(United Arab Emirates Football Association) Al-Ain
23	DF	Ghaith Al-Musharrkh	25 March 2006 (aged 18)	(United Arab Emirates Football Association) Shabab
24	MF	Anthony Khayat	13 February 2007 (aged 18)	(United Arab Emirates Football Association) Fursan Hispania
26	FW	Yannick Müller	12 July 2007 (aged 17)	(German Football Association) Karlsruher SC

== Group C ==
=== Lebanon ===
Coach: Jamal Taha

The squad was announced on 16 March 2025.

No.	Pos.	Player	Date of birth (age)	Club
1	GK	Shareef Azaki	13 January 2004 (aged 21)	(Lebanese Football Association) Mabarra
2	DF	Ali Alrida Ismail	8 July 2003 (aged 21)	(Lebanese Football Association) Nejmeh
3	DF	Mohamad Al Mahdi Al Moussawi	3 October 2003 (aged 21)	(Lebanese Football Association) Ansar
4	DF	Hasan Farhat	21 September 2004 (aged 20)	(Lebanese Football Association) Ahed
5	DF	Saad Chweiki	23 March 2003 (aged 21)	(Lebanese Football Association) Tripoli
6	MF	Mohamad Ghamlouch	19 May 2003 (aged 21)	(Lebanese Football Association) Racing Beirut
7	MF	Mahmoud Zbib (captain)	29 February 2004 (aged 21)	(Lebanese Football Association) Ahed
8	MF	Ali El Fadl	29 March 2003 (aged 21)	(Lebanese Football Association) Safa
9	FW	Hassan Bazzi	6 November 2004 (aged 20)	(Lebanese Football Association) Tadamon Sour
10	FW	Mohamad Omar Sadek	25 October 2003 (aged 21)	(Lebanese Football Association) Nejmeh
11	FW	Khaled Al Hajjar	22 September 2004 (aged 20)	(Lebanese Football Association) Nejmeh
12	DF	Hussein Kaawar	24 October 2003 (aged 21)	(Lebanese Football Association) Chabab Ghazieh
13	DF	Hsein Reda	7 April 2004 (aged 20)	(Lebanese Football Association) Ahed
14	FW	Mohamad Dana	14 January 2006 (aged 19)	(Swedish Football Association) Örebro SK
15	FW	Hasan Dana	13 March 2007 (aged 18)	(Swedish Football Association) Örebro SK
16	DF	Abbas Ballout	20 April 2003 (aged 21)	(Lebanese Football Association) Ansar
17	MF	Ali Alakbar Mannaa	23 June 2003 (aged 21)	(Lebanese Football Association) Ahed
18	MF	Yasser Dimachek	26 February 2003 (aged 22)	(Lebanese Football Association) Shabab Baalbek
19	DF	Ibrahim Chami	13 December 2003 (aged 21)	(Canadian Soccer Association) Valour FC
20	FW	Omar Bahlawan	20 December 2004 (aged 20)	(Lebanese Football Association) Ansar
21	MF	Mohamad Bou Saleh	19 March 2003 (aged 22)	(Lebanese Football Association) Ansar
22	GK	Mohammad Hojeij	16 January 2004 (aged 21)	(Lebanese Football Association) Shabab Sahel
23	GK	Zaher El Amin	15 May 2003 (aged 21)	(Lebanese Football Association) Tadamon Sour

=== Syria ===
Coach: Emad Khankan

The squad was announced on 15 March 2025.

No.	Pos.	Player	Date of birth (age)	Club
1	GK	Maksim Sarraf	15 March 2005 (aged 20)	(Russian Football Union) CSKA
2	MF	Yaser Kourdoghli	14 February 2003 (aged 22)	(Syrian Football Association) Tishreen
3	DF	Mohamed Tadmory	20 January 2004 (aged 21)	(Syrian Football Association) Al-Karamah
4	DF	Khaled Al-Hage	22 May 2004 (aged 20)	(Syrian Football Association) Hutteen
5	MF	Ammar Haded		(Syrian Football Association) Al-Karamah
6	MF	Abdullah Zakreet	3 January 2003 (aged 22)	(Syrian Football Association) Al-Karamah
7	MF	Hasan Dahan	5 January 2003 (aged 22)	(Syrian Football Association) Al-Ahli
8	MF	Can Moustfa	19 November 2004 (aged 20)	(German Football Association) Rot Weiss Ahlen
9	FW	Mohammad Al-Mustafa	20 January 2005 (aged 20)	(Syrian Football Association) Al-Wathba
10	MF	Mahmoud Nayef	3 January 2004 (aged 21)	(Syrian Football Association) Al-Ahli
11	FW	Anas Dahhan	31 January 2006 (aged 19)	(Syrian Football Association) Al-Ahli
12	MF	Aland Abdi	5 May 2005 (aged 19)	(Royal Dutch Football Association) Roda
13	FW	Amen Rahal		
14	FW	Mahmoud Al-Omar	15 May 2005 (aged 19)	(Syrian Football Association) Al-Ahli
15	DF	Mohammad Othman	10 January 2004 (aged 21)	(Syrian Football Association) Al-Wathba
16	FW	Mohanad Fadel	29 April 2003 (aged 21)	(Syrian Football Association) Al-Karamah
17	FW	Qais Al-Hassan		(Syrian Football Association) Al-Wathba
18	FW	Hozan Osman	16 May 2003 (aged 21)	(Royal Dutch Football Association) NEC
19	MF	Ahmed Al-Hussein		(Syrian Football Association) Al-Wathba
20	DF	Abdulrahman Al-Arjah	10 January 2006 (aged 19)	(Syrian Football Association) Al-Karamah
21	DF	Mohammed Saraqbi	10 January 2004 (aged 21)	(Syrian Football Association) Al-Karamah
22	GK	Mohamad Hassouni	7 January 2004 (aged 21)	(Syrian Football Association) Al-Ahli
23	GK	Yamen Motlaq	10 January 2003 (aged 22)	(Syrian Football Association) Al-Jaish

== Group D ==
=== Jordan ===
Coach: (Morocco) Omar Najhi

The squad was announced on 16 March 2025.

No.	Pos.	Player	Date of birth (age)	Club
1	GK	Murad Al-Faluji	27 December 2003 (aged 21)	(Jordan Football Association) Al-Hussein
2	DF	Ja'far Samara	8 June 2004 (aged 20)	(Jordan Football Association) Al-Ramtha
3	DF	Ayham Al-Samamreh	9 May 2006 (aged 18)	(Jordan Football Association) Al-Wehdat
4	DF	Arafat Al-Haj	17 April 2003 (aged 21)	(Jordan Football Association) Al-Wehdat
5	DF	Ahmed Ayman	28 November 2004 (aged 20)	(Jordan Football Association) Shabab Al-Ordon
6	MF	Mohammad Abu Hazeem	2 April 2003 (aged 21)	(Jordan Football Association) Al-Faisaly
7	FW	Ali Al-Azaizeh	13 April 2004 (aged 20)	(Bahrain Football Association) Al-Khaldiya
8	MF	Hashem Al-Mubaidin	24 December 2003 (aged 21)	(Jordan Football Association) Al-Jazeera
9	FW	Baker Kalbouneh	14 August 2003 (aged 21)	(Jordan Football Association) Al-Faisaly
10	FW	Ayham Hisham	14 August 2004 (aged 20)	(Jordan Football Association) Shabab Al-Ordon
11	FW	Seif Darwish	5 May 2003 (aged 21)	(Jordan Football Association) Al-Sareeh
13	MF	Mohammad Taha	13 July 2005 (aged 19)	(Jordan Football Association) Shabab Al-Ordon
14	MF	Qutaiba Al-Ajalin	12 July 2006 (aged 18)	(Jordan Football Association) Shabab Al-Aqaba
15	MF	Hussein Al-Rushdan	9 June 2003 (aged 21)	(Jordan Football Association) Al-Ramtha
16	MF	Saif Suleiman	22 September 2004 (aged 20)	(Jordan Football Association) Shabab Al-Ordon
17	DF	Zakaria Amro	26 June 2003 (aged 21)	(United States Soccer Federation) Wright State Raiders
18	MF	Mahmoud Yazan	15 November 2004 (aged 20)	(United Arab Emirates Football Association) Ajman
19	FW	Odeh Al-Fakhouri	20 November 2005 (aged 19)	(Jordan Football Association) Al-Hussein
20	FW	Anas Al-Khob	1 February 2006 (aged 19)	(Jordan Football Association) Al-Faisaly
21	MF	Qusay Al-Mansoori	6 May 2004 (aged 20)	(Jordan Football Association) Al-Faisaly
22	GK	Abdel Al-Talalga	12 April 2003 (aged 21)	(Jordan Football Association) Al-Faisaly
23	DF	Ibrahim Al-Jedi	28 May 2004 (aged 20)	(Jordan Football Association) Al-Salt
24	FW	Abdulrahman Al-Zaghaiba	10 April 2007 (aged 17)	(Jordan Football Association) Shabab Al-Aqaba
26	FW	Ahmad Al-Harahsha	12 May 2003 (aged 21)	(Jordan Football Association) Moghayer Al-Sarhan

=== Kuwait ===
Coach: (Croatia) Dario Bašić

The squad was announced on 10 March 2025.

No.	Pos.	Player	Date of birth (age)	Club
1	GK	Abdulrahman Al-Harbi	3 October 2003 (aged 21)	(Kuwait Football Association) Al-Tadamon
3	MF	Salem Al-Khatlan		
4	DF	Saleh Faisal	18 September 2003 (aged 21)	(Kuwait Football Association) Kazma
5	DF	Omar Al-Azemi	28 January 2007 (aged 18)	(Kuwait Football Association) Kazma
6	MF	Montaser Al-Abdulsalam	17 May 2005 (aged 19)	(Kuwait Football Association) Kazma
7	FW	Fahad Saud	1 January 2003 (aged 22)	(Kuwait Football Association) Al-Arabi
8	MF	Humoud Al-Sanousi	2 May 2003 (aged 21)	(Kuwait Football Association) Kuwait
9	FW	Abdulrahman Al-Rashidi	12 January 2004 (aged 21)	(Kuwait Football Association) Al-Nasr
10	MF	Omar Al-Saleem	6 February 2003 (aged 22)	(Kuwait Football Association) Kazma
11	FW	Eid Al-Ruqbah		(Kuwait Football Association) Al-Nasr
12	DF	Mohsen Ghareeb	11 November 2004 (aged 20)	(Kuwait Football Association) Al-Yarmouk
13	DF	Saad Al-Ajjmi		(Kuwait Football Association) Al-Sahel
14	DF	Abdullah Essa	8 April 2005 (aged 19)	(Kuwait Football Association) Al-Arabi
15	FW	Abdullah Al-Awadhi	20 March 2003 (aged 21)	(Kuwait Football Association) Qadsia
16	FW	Omar Al-Matar		(Kuwait Football Association) Kuwait
17	MF	Jarah Al-Heleeli	29 February 2004 (aged 21)	(Kuwait Football Association) Kazma
18	MF	Abdullah Al-Ghaniman		(Kuwait Football Association) Qadsia
19	FW	Ahmad Boodai	31 May 2006 (aged 18)	(Kuwait Football Association) Qadsia
20	DF	Mohammad Al-Suraiei		(Kuwait Football Association) Al-Salmiya
21	DF	Bandar Al-Barazi	24 January 2005 (aged 20)	(Kuwait Football Association) Al-Nasr
22	GK	Abdulredha Shehab	17 January 2004 (aged 21)	(Kuwait Football Association) Al-Arabi
23	GK	Dhari Al-Mesri		(Kuwait Football Association) Al-Sahel
24	FW	Khaled Al-Kharqawi	12 September 2006 (aged 18)	(Kuwait Football Association) Kuwait
25	DF	Nasser Al-Enezi	14 October 2003 (aged 21)	(Kuwait Football Association) Al-Nasr
26	MF	Ali Qitaami		(Kuwait Football Association) Al-Nasr
