= 2025 AFC U-20 Asian Cup qualification =

Tournament details
- Host countries: Vietnam (Group A); Chinese Taipei (Group B); Kuwait (Group C); Saudi Arabia (Group D); Tajikistan (Group E); Indonesia (Group F); Laos (Group G); Thailand (Group H); Kyrgyzstan (Group I); Qatar (Group J)
- Dates: 21–29 September 2024
- Teams: 45 (from 1 confederation)

Tournament statistics
- Matches played: 80
- Goals scored: 309 (3.86 per match)
- Top scorer: (Thailand) Caelan Ryan (5 goals)

The 2025 AFC U-20 Asian Cup qualification was an international men's under-20 football competition which was held to decide the participating teams of the 2025 AFC U-20 Asian Cup.

== Draw ==
46 out of 47 AFC member associations entered the competition. China, as the hosts, were automatically qualified for the final tournament and thus did not participate in qualification; Pakistan did not enter the competition at all.

The draw was held on 13 June 2024. The ten teams hosting the qualification groups were allocated to a separate pot, with other teams seeded according to their performance in the previous tournament and qualification process (overall ranking shown in parentheses).

Pot 1	Pot 2	Pot 3	Pot 4	Pot 5
1. **Uzbekistan** (1); 2. **Iraq** (2); 3. **Japan** (3); 4. **South Korea** (4); 5. **Australia** (5); 6. **Iran** (6); 7. **Jordan** (8); 8. Vietnam (9) **(H)**; 9. **Indonesia** (10) **(H)**; 10. Tajikistan (11) **(H)**	11. **Saudi Arabia** (12) **(H)**; 12. **Syria** (13); 13. **Kyrgyzstan** (14) **(H)**; 14. Oman (15); 15. **Qatar** (16) **(H)**; 16. **Thailand** (17) **(H)**; 17. Lebanon (18); 18. **Yemen** (19); 19. Mongolia (20); 20. Bahrain (21)	21. Chinese Taipei (22) **(H)**; 22. Malaysia (23); 23. Bangladesh (24); 24. Palestine (25); 25. United Arab Emirates (26); 26. Philippines (27); 27. India (28); 28. Myanmar (29); 29. Timor-Leste (30); 30. Singapore (31)	31. Afghanistan (32); 32. Cambodia (33); 33. Kuwait (34) **(H)**; 34. Turkmenistan (35); 35. Laos (36) **(H)**; 36. Bhutan (37); 37. Hong Kong (38); 38. Sri Lanka (39); 39. Brunei (40); 40. Maldives (41)	41. Nepal (42); 42. Guam (43); 43. Northern Mariana Islands (44); 44. **North Korea** (NR); 45. Macau (NR)

Notes

- Teams in **bold** qualified for the final tournament.
- (H): Qualification group hosts
- NR: Non-ranked teams
- Did not enter: Pakistan

== Player eligibility ==
Players born on or after 1 January 2005 were eligible to compete in the tournament.

== Schedule ==
Round	Groups A–E	Groups F–J
Matchday 1	21 September 2024	25 September 2024
Matchday 2	23 September 2024	27 September 2024
Matchday 3	25 September 2024	29 September 2024
Matchday 4	27 September 2024	—N/a
Matchday 5	29 September 2024	—N/a

== Groups ==
In each group, teams played each other once at a centralised venue.

The ten group winners and the five best runners-up qualified for the final tournament.

Tiebreakers
Teams were ranked according to points (3 points for a win, 1 point for a draw, 0 points for a loss), and if tied on points, the following tiebreaking criteria are applied, in the order given, to determine the rankings (Regulations Article 7.3):
1. Points in head-to-head matches among tied teams;
2. Goal difference in head-to-head matches among tied teams;
3. Goals scored in head-to-head matches among tied teams;
4. If more than two teams are tied, and after applying all head-to-head criteria above, a subset of teams are still tied, all head-to-head criteria above are reapplied exclusively to this subset of teams;
5. Goal difference in all group matches;
6. Goals scored in all group matches;
7. Penalty shoot-out if only two teams are tied and they met in the last round of the group;
8. Disciplinary points (yellow card = 1 point, red card as a result of two yellow cards = 3 points, direct red card = 3 points, yellow card followed by direct red card = 4 points);
9. Drawing of lots.

=== Group A ===
- All matches were held in Vietnam.
- Times listed are UTC+7.

Pos	Team	Pld	W	D	L	GF	GA	GD	Pts	Qualification
1	Syria	4	4	0	0	16	1	+15	12	Final tournament
2	Vietnam (H)	4	3	0	1	12	2	+10	9	
3	Bangladesh	4	1	1	2	5	11	−6	4	
4	Guam	4	0	2	2	4	16	−12	2	
5	Bhutan	4	0	1	3	2	9	−7	1	

Source: AFC
Rules for classification: Qualification tiebreakers
(H) Hosts
21 September 2024
16:00

Guam	1–1	Bhutan
Suzuki 42'	Report	Tenzin 2'

Lạch Tray Stadium, Haiphong
Attendance: 338
Referee: Ahmad Alaeddin (Lebanon)
21 September 2024
19:45

Bangladesh	0–4	Syria
	Report	Issa 5'; Knaj 12'; Dukhan 73'; Dahan 79'

Lạch Tray Stadium, Haiphong
Attendance: 198
Referee: Suhaizi Shukri (Malaysia)

23 September 2024
16:00

Guam	2–2	Bangladesh
Suzuki 75' (pen.); Harmon 90+1'	Report	Mirajul 6'; Moin 87'

Lạch Tray Stadium, Haiphong
Attendance: 325
Referee: Adam Kersey (Australia)
23 September 2024
19:00

Bhutan	0–5	Vietnam
	Report	Nguyễn Bảo Long 8'; Nguyễn Đăng Dương 52'; Nguyễn Công Phương 74', 90+1'; Nguyễn Hữu Tuấn 78'

Lạch Tray Stadium, Haiphong
Attendance: 5,616
Referee: Amir Arab Baraghi (Iran)

25 September 2024
16:00

Syria	1–0	Bhutan
Al-Kalou 68'	Report

Lạch Tray Stadium, Haiphong
Attendance: 121
Referee: Adam Kersey (Australia)
25 September 2024
19:00

Vietnam	3–0	Guam
Nguyễn Lê Phát 24' (pen.); Nguyễn Công Phương 45+2'; Nguyễn Hoàng Khanh 90+1'	Report

Lạch Tray Stadium, Haiphong
Attendance: 3,539
Referee: Tam Ping Wun (Hong Kong)

27 September 2024
16:00

Syria	10–1	Guam
Dahan 1', 5', 58'; Knaj 15'; Al-Mustafa 22', 47', 71'; Soufi 33'; Warda 77'; Al-Mihi 81'	Report	Gavin Baker 53'

Lạch Tray Stadium, Haiphong
Attendance: 116
Referee: Amir Arab (Iran)
27 September 2024
19:00

Bangladesh	1–4	Vietnam
Piash Nova 40'	Report	Hoàng Minh Tiến 4', 29'; Lê Văn Quang Duyệt 41'; Nguyễn Công Phương 80'

Lạch Tray Stadium, Haiphong
Attendance: 4,156
Referee: Suhaizi Shukri (Malaysia)

29 September 2024
16:00

Bhutan	1–2	Bangladesh
Sakib 71' (o.g.)	Report	Muhammad Molla 3'; Moin 86'

Lạch Tray Stadium, Haiphong
Attendance: 185
Referee: Tam Ping Wun (Hong Kong)
29 September 2024
19:00

Vietnam	0–1	Syria
	Report	Nguyễn Ngọc Chiến 76' (o.g.)

Lạch Tray Stadium, Haiphong
Attendance: 10,569
Referee: Ahmad Alaeddin (Lebanon)

=== Group B ===
- All matches were held in Chinese Taipei.
- Times listed are UTC+8.

Pos	Team	Pld	W	D	L	GF	GA	GD	Pts	Qualification
1	Uzbekistan	4	4	0	0	21	1	+20	12	Final tournament
2	Cambodia	4	2	1	1	6	9	−3	7	
3	Bahrain	4	2	0	2	5	6	−1	6	
4	Nepal	4	1	0	3	4	15	−11	3	
5	Chinese Taipei (H)	4	0	1	3	3	8	−5	1	

Source: AFC
Rules for classification: Qualification tiebreakers
(H) Hosts
21 September 2024
15:00

Nepal	1–4	Cambodia
Tamang 45+2'	Report	Vreak 3'; Thatthai 7'; Chanrith 61'; Sovannara 83'

Fu Jen Catholic University Stadium, New Taipei City
Attendance: 150
Referee: Mohammed Kanah (Syria)
21 September 2024
19:00

Chinese Taipei	0–1	Bahrain
	Report	Al-Khalaf 80'

Fu Jen Catholic University Stadium, New Taipei City
Attendance: 450
Referee: Harish Kundu (India)

23 September 2024
15:00

Cambodia	0–7	Uzbekistan
	Report	Tulkunbekov 13', 45+2'; Abdullaev 42'; Mukhammadali Urinboev 55'; Lazizbek Mirzaev 67'; Saidnurullayev 85', 90+3'

Fu Jen Catholic University Stadium, New Taipei City
Attendance: 48
Referee: Virendha Rai (Bhutan)
23 September 2024
19:00

Nepal	3–1	Chinese Taipei
Tamang 32', 35', 84'	Report	Yang Chao-jing 45+2'

Fu Jen Catholic University Stadium, New Taipei City
Attendance: 223
Referee: Lê Thị Ly (Vietnam)

25 September 2024
15:00

Uzbekistan	6–0	Nepal
Saidnurullayev 24', 27'; Ibraimov 29'; Lazizbek Mirzaev 67'; Rejabaliev 87'; Haydarov 90'	Report

Fu Jen Catholic University Stadium, New Taipei City
Attendance: 52
Referee: Songkran Bunmeekiart (Thailand)
25 September 2024
19:00

Bahrain	0–1	Cambodia
	Report	Chanrith 68'

Fu Jen Catholic University Stadium, New Taipei City
Attendance: 96
Referee: Harish Kundu (India)

27 September 2024
15:00

Bahrain	4–0	Nepal
Sami Bassam 27', 73'; Al-Khalaf 45+1'; Ali Hasan 83'	Report

Fu Jen Catholic University Stadium, New Taipei City
Attendance: 50
Referee: Virendha Rai (Bhutan)
27 September 2024
19:00

Chinese Taipei	1–3	Uzbekistan
Kao Kuan-yu 45+1'	Report	Haydarov 23'; Khayrullaev 58', 77'

Fu Jen Catholic University Stadium, New Taipei City
Attendance: 453
Referee: Mohammed Kanah (Syria)

29 September 2024
15:00

Uzbekistan	5–0	Bahrain
Abdullaev 26'; Mukhammadali Urinboev 61'; Ibraimov 79', 86'; Tukhsanov 89'	Report

Fu Jen Catholic University Stadium, New Taipei City
Attendance: 32
Referee: Songkran Bunmeekiart (Thailand)
29 September 2024
19:00

Cambodia	1–1	Chinese Taipei
Sovannara 36'	Report	Chen Kuan-lin 10'

Fu Jen Catholic University Stadium, New Taipei City
Attendance: 556
Referee: Lê Thị Ly (Vietnam)

=== Group C ===
- All matches were held in Kuwait.
- Times listed are UTC+3.

Pos	Team	Pld	W	D	L	GF	GA	GD	Pts	Qualification
1	South Korea	4	4	0	0	18	2	+16	12	Final tournament
2	United Arab Emirates	4	2	1	1	17	5	+12	7	
3	Kuwait (H)	4	2	1	1	9	3	+6	7	
4	Lebanon	4	1	0	3	11	8	+3	3	
5	Northern Mariana Islands	4	0	0	4	0	37	−37	0	

Source: AFC
Rules for classification: Qualification tiebreakers
(H) Hosts
21 September 2024
17:30

United Arab Emirates	3–2	Lebanon
Eid Al-Hammadi 45+6'; Khayat 46'; Bader 51'	Report	Khawaja 90+2'; Kassas 90+3'

Abdullah Alkhalifa Alsabah Stadium, Mishref
Attendance: 400
Referee: Yahya Al Balushi (Oman)
21 September 2024
20:30

Northern Mariana Islands	0–6	Kuwait
	Report	Eid Al-Ruqbah 1'; Turki Al-Yousef 5', 49', 53'; Y. Al-Shammari 10', 17'

Abdullah Alkhalifa Alsabah Stadium, Mishref
Attendance: 200
Referee: Zayniddin Alimov (Kyrgyzstan)

23 September 2024
17:30

Northern Mariana Islands	0–13	United Arab Emirates
	Report	Yousif Al-Marzooqi 11'; Hazim Abbas 17', 38'; Saif Al-Kaabi 29'; Eid Al-Hammadi 35', 39'; Bader 45+2'; Obaid Salem 50', 88', 90+2'; Ahmed Al-Shammari 64'; S. Nasser 66', 90'

Abdullah Alkhalifa Alsabah Stadium, Mishref
Attendance: 50
Referee: Muath Owfi (Palestine)
23 September 2024
20:30

Kuwait	0–3	South Korea
	Report	Kim Tae-won 45'; Kim Ho-jin 45+5'; Jin Jun-seo 71'

Abdullah Alkhalifa Alsabah Stadium, Mishref
Attendance: 1,100
Referee: Clifford Daypuyat (Philippines)

25 September 2024
17:30

South Korea	10–0	Northern Mariana Islands
Kim Myung-jun 3'; Lee Soo-ah 15'; Baek Ga-on 17'; Markus Toves 45' (o.g.); Kim Gyeol 45+1'; Monico Claridades 50' (o.g.); Baek Min-gyu 51', 88'; Sim Yeon-won 54'; Yoon Do-young 87'	Report

Abdullah Alkhalifa Alsabah Stadium, Mishref
Attendance: 150
Referee: Nurzatbek Abdykadyrov (Kyrgyzstan)
25 September 2024
20:30

Lebanon	0–3	Kuwait
	Report	Bandar Al-Barazi 4'; Osseili 72' (o.g.); Y. Al-Shammari 82'

Abdullah Alkhalifa Alsabah Stadium, Mishref
Attendance: 450
Referee: Muath Owfi (Palestine)

27 September 2024
17:30

Lebanon	8–0	Northern Mariana Islands
Malek Fakieh 15', 17', 35'; Hassan Nasser 28', 90+2'; Karim Kassem 76'; Kassem Watfa 80'; Nehme 82'	Report

Abdullah Alkhalifa Alsabah Stadium, Mishref
Attendance: 100
Referee: Zayniddin Alimov (Kyrgyzstan)
27 September 2024
20:30

United Arab Emirates	1–3	South Korea
Hazim Abbas 41'	Report	Kim Tae-won 26'; Kim Gyeol 60'; Yoon Do-young 90'

Abdullah Alkhalifa Alsabah Stadium, Mishref
Attendance: 200
Referee: Clifford Daypuyat (Philippines)

29 September 2024
17:30

South Korea	2–1	Lebanon
Hong Seok-hyun 14'; Lee Chang-woo 22'	Report	El Hajj 90+6' (pen.)

Abdullah Alkhalifa Alsabah Stadium, Mishref
Attendance: 150
Referee: Nurzatbek Abdykadyrov (Kyrgyzstan)
29 September 2024
20:30

Kuwait	0–0	United Arab Emirates
	Report

Abdullah Alkhalifa Alsabah Stadium, Mishref
Attendance: 721
Referee: Yahya Al-Balushi (Oman)

=== Group D ===
- All matches were held in Saudi Arabia.
- Times listed are UTC+3.

Pos	Team	Pld	W	D	L	GF	GA	GD	Pts	Qualification
1	Saudi Arabia (H)	4	3	1	0	10	0	+10	10	Final tournament
2	Australia	4	3	1	0	6	1	+5	10	Final tournament
3	Afghanistan	4	1	1	2	1	6	−5	4	
4	Palestine	4	0	2	2	2	4	−2	2	
5	Macau	4	0	1	3	1	9	−8	1	

Source: AFC
Rules for classification: Qualification tiebreakers
(H) Hosts
21 September 2024
16:00

Macau	0–1	Afghanistan
	Report	Hadafmand 54'

Prince Sultan bin Abdulaziz Sports City, Abha
Attendance: 20
Referee: Meder Tayçiev (Kyrgyzstan)
21 September 2024
20:00

Palestine	0–1	Saudi Arabia
	Report	Talal Haji 57'

Prince Sultan bin Abdulaziz Sports City, Abha
Attendance: 120
Referee: Ismaeel Habib (Bahrain)

23 September 2024
16:00

Afghanistan	0–2	Australia
	Report	Jovanovic 84', 90+3' (pen.)

Prince Sultan bin Abdulaziz Sports City, Abha
Attendance: 50
Referee: Yousif Saeed Hasan (Iraq)
23 September 2024
20:00

Macau	1–1	Palestine
Lei Cheng Lam 45+2'	Report	B. Elhaj 16'

Prince Sultan bin Abdulaziz Sports City, Abha
Attendance: 20
Referee: Wissam Rabie (Syria)

25 September 2024
16:00

Australia	2–0	Macau
Kikianis 9', 50'	Report

Prince Sultan bin Abdulaziz Sports City, Abha
Attendance: 20
Referee: Sayyodjon Zayniddinov (Tajikistan)
25 September 2024
20:00

Saudi Arabia	4–0	Afghanistan
Talal Haji 56'; Thamer Al-Khaibri 76', 90+7'; Ali Al-Mahdawi 90+2'	Report

Prince Sultan bin Abdulaziz Sports City, Abha
Attendance: 120
Referee: Ismaeel Habib (Bahrain)

27 September 2024
16:00

Palestine	1–2	Australia
Suheib Ali 7'	Report	Youlley 45+1'; Badolato 74'

Prince Sultan bin Abdulaziz Sports City, Abha
Attendance: 40
Referee: Wissam Rabie (Syria)
27 September 2024
20:00

Saudi Arabia	5–0	Macau
Thamer Al-Khaibri 13' (pen.), 38', 53'; Ziyad Al-Ghamdi 80'; Awad Aman 83'	Report

Prince Sultan bin Abdulaziz Sports City, Abha
Attendance: 210
Referee: Yousif Saeed Hasan (Iraq)

29 September 2024
16:00

Afghanistan	0–0	Palestine
	Report

Prince Sultan bin Abdulaziz Sports City, Abha
Attendance: 20
Referee: Meder Tayçiev (Kyrgyzstan)
29 September 2024
20:00

Australia	0–0	Saudi Arabia
	Report

Prince Sultan bin Abdulaziz Sports City, Abha
Attendance: 777
Referee: Sayyodjon Zayniddinov (Tajikistan)

=== Group E ===
- All matches were held in Tajikistan.
- Times listed are UTC+5.

Pos	Team	Pld	W	D	L	GF	GA	GD	Pts	Qualification
1	North Korea	4	3	1	0	7	0	+7	10	Final tournament
2	Oman	4	2	0	2	9	4	+5	6	
3	Tajikistan (H)	4	2	0	2	5	5	0	6	
4	Malaysia	4	1	2	1	3	3	0	5	
5	Sri Lanka	4	0	1	3	1	13	−12	1	

Source: AFC
Rules for classification: Qualification tiebreakers
(H) Hosts
21 September 2024
17:00

Malaysia	2–1	Oman
Moses Raj 30'; Haykal 66' (pen.)	Report	Majid Al-Farsi 88' (pen.)

Republican Central Stadium, Dushanbe
Attendance: 100
Referee: Venkatesh Ramachandran (India)
21 September 2024
20:00

North Korea	4–0	Sri Lanka
Ri Jong-dok 33', 64', 77'; Choe Kuk 46'	Report

Republican Central Stadium, Dushanbe
Attendance: 110
Referee: Mohamed Javiz (Maldives)

23 September 2024
17:00

North Korea	0–0	Malaysia
	Report

Republican Central Stadium, Dushanbe
Attendance: 35
Referee: Feras Taweel (Syria)
23 September 2024
20:00

Sri Lanka	0–3	Tajikistan
	Report	Boboev 2'; Gafurov 45+2', 54' (pen.)

Republican Central Stadium, Dushanbe
Attendance: 2,345
Referee: Torphong Somsing (Thailand)

25 September 2024
17:00

Oman	5–0	Sri Lanka
Al-Manwari 12'; Muhannad Al-Saadi 18'; Yousef Al-Shabibi 34', 37'; Faisal Al-Hadidi 56'	Report

Republican Central Stadium, Dushanbe
Attendance: 60
Referee: Torphong Somsing (Thailand)
25 September 2024
20:00

Tajikistan	0–2	North Korea
	Report	Choe Kuk 26'; Ra Mu-ryong 90+1'

Republican Central Stadium, Dushanbe
Attendance: 2,784
Referee: Ngô Duy Lân (Vietnam)

27 September 2024
17:00

Oman	0–1	North Korea
	Report	Ri Jong-dok 80'

Republican Central Stadium, Dushanbe
Attendance: 15
Referee: Venkatesh Ramachandran (India)
27 September 2024
20:00

Malaysia	0–1	Tajikistan
	Report	Khushvakhtov 90+5'

Republican Central Stadium, Dushanbe
Attendance: 225
Referee: Mohamed Javiz (Maldives)

29 September 2024
17:00

Sri Lanka	1–1	Malaysia
Harish 87'	Report	Amir Farhan 32'

Republican Central Stadium, Dushanbe
Attendance: 20
Referee: Feras Taweel (Syria)
29 September 2024
20:00

Tajikistan	1–3	Oman
Khamidov 11'	Report	Yousef Al-Shabibi 14'; Hamad Al-Mukhaini 67'; Al-Manwari 71' (pen.)

Republican Central Stadium, Dushanbe
Attendance: 2,721
Referee: Ngô Duy Lân (Vietnam)

=== Group F ===
- All matches were held in Indonesia.
- Times listed are UTC+7.

Pos	Team	Pld	W	D	L	GF	GA	GD	Pts	Qualification
1	Indonesia (H)	3	2	1	0	8	2	+6	7	Final tournament
2	Yemen	3	2	1	0	7	2	+5	7	Final tournament
3	Timor-Leste	3	1	0	2	6	7	−1	3	
4	Maldives	3	0	0	3	1	11	−10	0	

Source: AFC
Rules for classification: Qualification tiebreakers
(H) Hosts
25 September 2024
15:00

Yemen	3–1	Timor-Leste
Abdulaziz Masnoum 29', 57'; Al-Khadher 74'	Report	Alexandro Bahkito 69'

Gelora Bung Karno Madya Stadium, Jakarta
Attendance: 180
Referee: Choi Hyun-jai (South Korea)
25 September 2024
19:30

Indonesia	4–0	Maldives
Aditya 52'; Figo 54'; Toni 57'; Raven 65'	Report

Gelora Bung Karno Madya Stadium, Jakarta
Attendance: 1,548
Referee: Mohamed Khaled (Bahrain)

27 September 2024
15:00

Maldives	0–3	Yemen
	Report	Adel Qasem 8'; Anwar Al-Turaiqi 41'; Mohammed Al-Awami 90'

Gelora Bung Karno Madya Stadium, Jakarta
Attendance: 214
Referee: Mohamad Issa (Lebanon)
27 September 2024
19:30

Timor-Leste	1–3	Indonesia
Luís Figo 66'	Report	Raven 13'; Riski 16'; Ragil 77'

Gelora Bung Karno Madya Stadium, Jakarta
Attendance: 2,761
Referee: Saud Al-Samhan (Kuwait)

29 September 2024
15:00

Timor-Leste	4–1	Maldives
Alexandro Bahkito 40'; Vabio Canavaro 44'; Aiman Ali 61' (o.g.); Luís Figo 73'	Report	Hassan 64'

Gelora Bung Karno Madya Stadium, Jakarta
Attendance: 296
Referee: Mohamed Khaled (Bahrain)
29 September 2024
19:30

Indonesia	1–1	Yemen
Raven 45+1'	Report	Al-Khadher 45+3'

Gelora Bung Karno Madya Stadium, Jakarta
Attendance: 7,015
Referee: Resul Mämmedow (Turkmenistan)

=== Group G ===
- All matches were held in Laos.
- Times listed are UTC+7.

Pos	Team	Pld	W	D	L	GF	GA	GD	Pts	Qualification
1	Iran	3	3	0	0	17	0	+17	9	Final tournament
2	India	3	2	0	1	6	2	+4	6	
3	Laos (H)	3	1	0	2	6	10	−4	3	
4	Mongolia	3	0	0	3	1	18	−17	0	

Source: AFC
Rules for classification: Qualification tiebreakers
(H) Hosts
25 September 2024
16:00

Mongolia	1–4	India
Uuganbat 44'	Report	Kelvin Taorem 19'; Kipgen 51', 53'; Korou Thingujam 85'

New Laos National Stadium, Vientiane
Attendance: 132
Referee: Wong Wai Lun (Hong Kong)
25 September 2024
19:00

Iran	8–0	Laos
Bozorgianasl 8'; Amir Razzaghinia 29'; Barajeh 31', 88' (pen.); Esmaeil Gholizadeh 35'; Taheri 40', 90+3' (pen.); Kahrizi 63'	Report

New Laos National Stadium, Vientiane
Attendance: 2,258
Referee: Zhang Lei (China)

27 September 2024
16:00

India	0–1	Iran
	Report	Mazraeh 87'

New Laos National Stadium, Vientiane
Attendance: 142
Referee: Asker Nadjafaliyev (Uzbekistan)
27 September 2024
19:00

Laos	6–0	Mongolia
Hopchakkavan 5', 65'; Keohanam 13'; Phanthavong 55'; Panyavong 61'; Choummaly 78'	Report

New Laos National Stadium, Vientiane
Attendance: 1,850
Referee: Hussain Sinan (Maldives)

29 September 2024
16:00

Iran	8–0	Mongolia
Esmaeil Gholizadeh 24', 81'; Mazraeh 32'; Taheri 43' (pen.); Barajeh 44'; Kahrizi 54'; Moredi 72' (pen.); Asghar Sheikholeslami 89'	Report

New Laos National Stadium, Vientiane
Attendance: 216
Referee: Wong Wai Lun (Hong Kong)
29 September 2024
19:00

India	2–0	Laos
Goyary 69'; Gangte 84'	Report

New Laos National Stadium, Vientiane
Attendance: 3,323
Referee: Shukri Al-Hunfush (Saudi Arabia)

=== Group H ===
- All matches were held in Thailand.
- Times listed are UTC+7.

Pos	Team	Pld	W	D	L	GF	GA	GD	Pts	Qualification
1	Iraq	3	3	0	0	18	0	+18	9	Final tournament
2	Thailand (H)	3	2	0	1	18	1	+17	6	Final tournament
3	Philippines	3	1	0	2	4	7	−3	3	
4	Brunei	3	0	0	3	0	32	−32	0	

Source: AFC
Rules for classification: Qualification tiebreakers
(H) Hosts
25 September 2024
15:30

Iraq	15–0	Brunei
Mustafa Nawaf 15', 42', 45'; Sidad Haji 17', 33'; Jaafar 27', 29'; Amoori Faisal 39' (pen.), 60'; Danish Firdaus 50' (o.g.); Aymen Luay 56', 68', 87'; Halgurd Qais Jaafer 73'; Ahmed Jasim 85'	Report

Buriram City Stadium, Buriram
Attendance: 85
Referee: Crystal John (India)
25 September 2024
19:30

Thailand	5–0	Philippines
Thanakrit 14'; Caelan Ryan 16', 23', 44'; Thanawut 74'	Report

Buriram City Stadium, Buriram
Attendance: 1,359
Referee: Sultan Mohamed Al Hammadi (United Arab Emirates)

27 September 2024
15:30

Philippines	0–2	Iraq
	Report	Amoori Faisal 9' (pen.); Sidad Haji 62'

Buriram City Stadium, Buriram
Attendance: 69
Referee: Chen Hsin-chuan (Chinese Taipei)
27 September 2024
19:30

Brunei	0–13	Thailand
	Report	Siradanai 1'; Caelan Ryan 8', 10'; Phongsakorn 36'; Thanawut 37'; Thanyakon 40'; Wafiq Danish 43' (o.g.); Chanothai 59' (pen.), 78'; Nathakorn 74', 80', 89'; Paripan 90+10'

Buriram City Stadium, Buriram
Attendance: 1,053
Referee: Yudi Nurcahya (Indonesia)

29 September 2024
15:30

Philippines	4–0	Brunei
Otu Bisong 4'; Cyrelle Saut 50'; Bacchus Ekberg 51'; Trez Mariñas 89'	Report

Buriram City Stadium, Buriram
Attendance: 70
Referee: Mohammad Ghabayen (Jordan)
29 September 2024
19:30

Iraq	1–0	Thailand
Jaafar 20'	Report

Buriram City Stadium, Buriram
Attendance: 2,177
Referee: Crystal John (India)

=== Group I ===
- All matches were held in Kyrgyzstan.
- Times listed are UTC+6.

Pos	Team	Pld	W	D	L	GF	GA	GD	Pts	Qualification
1	Japan	3	2	1	0	9	1	+8	7	Final tournament
2	Kyrgyzstan (H)	3	2	1	0	4	1	+3	7	Final tournament
3	Turkmenistan	3	1	0	2	4	4	0	3	
4	Myanmar	3	0	0	3	1	12	−11	0	

Source: AFC
Rules for classification: Qualification tiebreakers
(H) Hosts
25 September 2024
16:00

Japan	2–0	Turkmenistan
Kanda 22', 48'	Report

Dolen Omurzakov Stadium, Bishkek
Attendance: 254
Referee: Jansen Foo (Singapore)
25 September 2024
20:00

Kyrgyzstan	2–0	Myanmar
Ermekov 17'; Madanov 38'	Report

Dolen Omurzakov Stadium, Bishkek
Attendance: 4,295
Referee: Ahmed Kadhim Gatea (Iraq)

27 September 2024
16:00

Myanmar	0–6	Japan
	Report	Hiroi 24', 64'; Nakagawa 31', 82', 83'; Nishihara 44'

Dolen Omurzakov Stadium, Bishkek
Attendance: 253
Referee: Morteza Mansourian (Iran)
27 September 2024
20:00

Turkmenistan	0–1	Kyrgyzstan
	Report	Almazbekov 62' (pen.)

Dolen Omurzakov Stadium, Bishkek
Attendance: 3,373
Referee: Yaasin Hanafiah (Malaysia)

29 September 2024
16:00

Myanmar	1–4	Turkmenistan
Saw Sae Ka Paw Say 13'	Report	Esenow 17', 89' (pen.); Garajaýew 40'; Berenow 90+1'

Dolen Omurzakov Stadium, Bishkek
Attendance: 73
Referee: Yaasin Hanafiah (Malaysia)
29 September 2024
20:00

Japan	1–1	Kyrgyzstan
Kanda 50'	Report	Madanov 47'

Dolen Omurzakov Stadium, Bishkek
Attendance: 10,177
Referee: Nivon Robesh (Sri Lanka)

=== Group J ===
- All matches were held in Qatar.
- Times listed are UTC+3.

Pos	Team	Pld	W	D	L	GF	GA	GD	Pts	Qualification
1	Qatar (H)	3	3	0	0	8	2	+6	9	Final tournament
2	Jordan	3	2	0	1	11	3	+8	6	Final tournament
3	Hong Kong	3	1	0	2	2	9	−7	3	
4	Singapore	3	0	0	3	0	7	−7	0	

Source: AFC
Rules for classification: Qualification tiebreakers
(H) Hosts
25 September 2024
20:00

Jordan	7–0	Hong Kong
Al-Fakhouri 37'; Khrouba 42'; Al-Khdour 47'; Sabra 51'; Ghanajoq 60'; Taha 80'; Al-Khob 90'	Report

Grand Hamad Stadium, Doha
Attendance: 110
Referee: Baraa Aisha (Palestine)
25 September 2024
20:00

Qatar	3–0	Singapore
Al-Hassan 9'; Gouda 20'; Al-Bagoori 54'	Report

Abdullah bin Khalifa Stadium, Doha
Attendance: 700
Referee: Maher Al-Ali (Lebanon)

27 September 2024
20:00

Hong Kong	0–2	Qatar
	Report	Gouda 47'; Al-Hassan 61'

Abdullah bin Khalifa Stadium, Doha
Attendance: 600
Referee: Wiwat Jumpaoon (Thailand)
27 September 2024
20:00

Singapore	0–2	Jordan
	Report	Al-Fakhouri 26'; Sabra 30'

Grand Hamad Stadium, Doha
Attendance: 125
Referee: Adam Fazeel (Maldives)

29 September 2024
20:00

Jordan	2–3	Qatar
Al-Fakhouri 39'; Al-Bagoori 69' (o.g.)	Report	Gouda 6'; Al-Bagoori 51'; Al-Hassan 55'

Abdullah bin Khalifa Stadium, Doha
Attendance: 900
Referee: Hiroki Kasahara (Japan)
29 September 2024
20:00

Singapore	0–2	Hong Kong
	Report	Pinto 26'; Ho Tung Lam 48'

Grand Hamad Stadium, Doha
Attendance: 80
Referee: Wiwat Jumpaoon (Thailand)

== Ranking of second-placed teams ==
Due to groups having a different number of teams, the results against the fifth-placed teams in five-team groups were not considered for this ranking.

Pos	Grp	Team	Pld	W	D	L	GF	GA	GD	Pts	Qualification
1	F	Yemen	3	2	1	0	7	2	+5	7	Final tournament
2	I	Kyrgyzstan	3	2	1	0	4	1	+3	7 (Note: Teams equal second. Disciplinary points criterion: Kyrgyzstan –4, Australia –4.)	Final tournament
3	D	Australia	3	2	1	0	4	1	+3	7	Final tournament
4	H	Thailand	3	2	0	1	18	1	+17	6	Final tournament
5	J	Jordan	3	2	0	1	11	3	+8	6	Final tournament
6	A	Vietnam	3	2	0	1	7	2	+5	6	
7	G	India	3	2	0	1	6	2	+4	6	
8	B	Cambodia	3	2	0	1	5	8	−3	6	
9	C	United Arab Emirates	3	1	1	1	4	5	−1	4	
10	E	Oman	3	1	0	2	4	4	0	3	

Rules for classification: 1) points; 2) goal difference; 3) goals scored; 4) disciplinary points; 5) drawing of lots.

== Qualified teams ==
A total of 16 teams, including the hosts China, qualified for the final tournament.

Team	Qualified as	Appearance	Previous best performance
China	Hosts	20th	Champions (1985)
Syria	Group A winners	12th	Champions (1994)
Uzbekistan	Group B winners	9th	Champions (2023)
South Korea	Group C winners	40th	Champions (1959, 1960, 1963, 1978, 1980, 1982, 1990, 1996, 1998, 2002, 2004, 2012)
Saudi Arabia	Group D winners	15th	Champions (1986, 1992, 2018)
North Korea	Group E winners	14th	Champions (1976, 2006, 2010)
Indonesia	Group F winners	20th	Champions (1961)
Iran	Group G winners	22nd	Champions (1973, 1974, 1975, 1976)
Iraq	Group H winners	19th	Champions (1975, 1977, 1978, 1988, 2000)
Japan	Group I winners	39th	Champions (2016)
Qatar	Group J winners	16th	Champions (2014)
Yemen	Best runners-up	8th	Quarter-finals (1975)
Kyrgyzstan	2nd-best runners-up	3rd	Group stage (2006, 2023)
Australia	3rd-best runners-up	9th	Runners-up (2010)
Thailand	4th-best runners-up	34th	Champions (1962, 1969)
Jordan	5th-best runners-up	9th	Fourth place (2006)

== Goalscorers ==
There were 309 goals scored in 80 matches, for an average of 3.86 goals per match.

5 goals

- (Thailand) Caelan Ryan

4 goals

- (Nepal) Samir Tamang
- (North Korea) Ri Jong-dok
- (Syria) Anas Dahhan
- (Uzbekistan) Saidumarkhon Saidnurullayev
- (Vietnam) Nguyễn Công Phương
- (Qatar) Ibrahim Al-Hassan

3 goals

- (Indonesia) Jens Raven
- (Iran) Esmaeil Gholizadeh
- (Iran) Kasra Taheri
- (Iran) Yaghoob Barajeh
- (Iraq) Amoori Faisal
- (Iraq) Aymen Luay
- (Iraq) Karrar Jaafar
- (Iraq) Mustafa Nawaf
- (Iraq) Sidad Haji
- (Japan) Hagumu Nakagawa
- (Japan) Soma Kanda
- (Jordan) Odeh Al-Fakhouri
- (Saudi Arabia) Thamer Al-Khaibari
- (Kuwait) Yousef Al-Shammari
- (Kuwait) Turki Al-Yousef
- (Lebanon) Ali Fakieh
- (Oman) Yousuf Ali Al-Shabibi
- (Qatar) Mohamed Khaled Gouda
- (Syria) Mohammad Al-Mustafa
- (Thailand) Nathakorn Rattanasuwan
- (United Arab Emirates) Eid Al-Hammadi
- (United Arab Emirates) Hazim Abaas
- (United Arab Emirates) Obaid Salem
- (Uzbekistan) Nurlan Ibraimov

2 goals

- (Australia) Luka Jovanovic
- (Australia) Panagiotis Kikianis
- (Bahrain) Khaled Al-Khalaf
- (Bahrain) Sami Bassam
- (Bangladesh) Moinul Islam Moin
- (Cambodia) Eav Sovannara
- (Cambodia) Mean Chanrith
- (Guam) Shuntaro Suzuki
- (India) Manglenthang Kipgen
- (Iran) Abbas Kahrizi
- (Iran) Yousef Mazraeh
- (Japan) Rando Hiroi
- (Jordan) Ibrahim Sabra
- (Kyrgyzstan) Beknaz Almazbekov
- (South Korea) Baek Min-gyu
- (South Korea) Kim Gyeol
- (South Korea) Kim Tae-won
- (South Korea) Yoon Do-yong
- (Saudi Arabia) Talal Haji
- (Laos) Souksavanh Hopchakkavan
- (Oman) Oday Al-Manwari
- (North Korea) Choe Kuk
- (Qatar) Bassam Eid
- (Syria) Youshaa Knaj
- (Thailand) Chanothai Kongmeng
- (Thailand) Thanawut Phochai
- (Tajikistan) Masrur Gafurov
- (Timor-Leste) Alexandro Bahkito
- (Timor-Leste) Luís Figo
- (United Arab Emirates) Ghaith Bader
- (United Arab Emirates) Saif Nasser
- (Uzbekistan) Abdugafur Haydarov
- (Uzbekistan) Azizbek Tulkunbekov
- (Uzbekistan) Dilshod Abdullaev
- (Uzbekistan) Lazizbek Mirzaev
- (Uzbekistan) Mukhammadali Urinboev
- (Uzbekistan) Ravshan Khayrullaev
- (Vietnam) Hoàng Minh Tiến
- (Yemen) Abdulaziz Masnom
- (Yemen) Abdulrahman Al Khadher

1 goal

- (Afghanistan) Esmatullah Hadafmand
- (Australia) Alexander Badolato
- (Australia) Rhys Youlley
- (Bangladesh) Asadul Molla
- (Bangladesh) Mirajul Islam
- (Bangladesh) Piash Ahmed Nova
- (Bahrain) Ali Ahmed Hasan
- (Bhutan) Kinzang Tenzin
- (Cambodia) Phan Vreak
- (Cambodia) Phoeuk Thatthai
- (Guam) Curtis Harmon
- (Guam) Gavin Baker
- (Hong Kong) Anthony Pinto
- (Hong Kong) Ho Tung Lam
- (Indonesia) Aditya Warman
- (Indonesia) Figo Dennis
- (Indonesia) Toni Firmansyah
- (Indonesia) Muhammad Ragil
- (Indonesia) Riski Afrisal
- (India) Gwgwmsar Goyary
- (India) Kelvin Singh Taorem
- (India) Korou Singh Thingujam
- (India) Thanglalsoun Gangte
- (Iran) Abolfazl Moredi
- (Iran) Ali Asghar Sheikholeslami
- (Iran) Amir Mohammad Razzaghinia
- (Iran) Farhan Bozorgianasl
- (Iraq) Ahmed Jasim
- (Iraq) Halgurd Qays
- (Japan) Motoki Nishihara
- (Jordan) Abdelrahman Al-Khdour
- (Jordan) Anas Al-Khob
- (Jordan) Omar Ghanajoq
- (Jordan) Mohammad Taha
- (Jordan) Mahmoud Khrouba
- (Kyrgyzstan) Baibol Ermekov
- (Kyrgyzstan) Yryskeldi Madanov
- (South Korea) Baek Ga-on
- (South Korea) Hong Seok-hyun
- (South Korea) Jin Jun-seo
- (South Korea) Kim Ho-jin
- (South Korea) Kim Myung-jun
- (South Korea) Lee Chang-woo
- (South Korea) Lee Soo-ah
- (South Korea) Shim Yeon-won
- (Saudi Arabia) Ali Al-Mahdawi
- (Saudi Arabia) Awad Muhsen
- (Saudi Arabia) Ziyad Al-Ghamdi
- (Kuwait) Bandar Al-Barazi
- (Kuwait) Eid Al-Ruqbah
- (Laos) Peter Phanthavong
- (Laos) Phousomboun Panyavong
- (Laos) Sayfon Keohanam
- (Laos) Somvang Choummaly
- (Lebanon) Anis Nehme
- (Lebanon) Hassan Nasser
- (Lebanon) Joe Khawaja
- (Lebanon) Josef El Hajj
- (Lebanon) Karim Kassem
- (Lebanon) Kassem Watfa
- (Lebanon) Mohamad Kassas
- (Macau) Lei Cheng Lam
- (Malaysia) Amir Farhan
- (Malaysia) Haykal Danish
- (Malaysia) Moses Raj
- (Maldives) Muzdhan Hassan
- (Mongolia) Temulen Uuganbat
- (Myanmar) Saw Sae Ka Paw Say
- (Oman) Majid Al-Farsi
- (Oman) Fahad Al-Mukhaini
- (Oman) Faisal Al-Hadidi
- (Oman) Muhand Al-Saadi
- (Palestine) Basim Elhaj
- (Palestine) Suheibelias Ali
- (Philippines) Bacchus Ekberg
- (Philippines) Cyrelle Saut
- (Philippines) Otu Banatao
- (Philippines) Rodrigo Mariñas
- (North Korea) Ra Mu-ryong
- (Sri Lanka) Johnjimron Harish
- (Syria) Ahmad Alkalou
- (Syria) Wessam Dukhan
- (Syria) Kawa Issa
- (Syria) Abdulrahman Al-Mihi
- (Syria) Mamdouh Warda
- (Thailand) Paripan Wongsa
- (Thailand) Phongsakorn Sangkasopha
- (Thailand) Siradanai Phosri
- (Thailand) Thanakrit Chotmuangpak
- (Thailand) Thanyakon Swangsuk
- (Tajikistan) Bilol Boboev
- (Tajikistan) Dzhovidon Khushvakhtov
- (Tajikistan) Mehrubon Khamidov
- (Turkmenistan) Gurbangeldi Garajayev
- (Turkmenistan) Gurbanmuhammet Esenov
- (Turkmenistan) Magtymberdi Berenov
- (Timor-Leste) Vabio Canavaro
- (Chinese Taipei) Chen Kuan-lin
- (Chinese Taipei) Kao Kuan-yu
- (Chinese Taipei) Yang Chao-jing
- (United Arab Emirates) Yousef Al-Marzouqi
- (United Arab Emirates) Saif Al-Kaabi
- (United Arab Emirates) Ahmed Al-Shammari
- (United Arab Emirates) Anthony Khayat
- (Uzbekistan) Meyirbek Rejabaliev
- (Uzbekistan) Daler Tukhsanov
- (Vietnam) Lê Văn Quang Duyệt
- (Vietnam) Nguyễn Bảo Long
- (Vietnam) Nguyễn Đăng Dương
- (Vietnam) Nguyễn Hoàng Khanh
- (Vietnam) Nguyễn Hữu Tuấn
- (Vietnam) Nguyễn Lê Phát
- (Yemen) Adel Qasem
- (Yemen) Anwar Al Turaiqi
- (Yemen) Esam Radman
- (Yemen) Mohammed Al Awami

1 own goal

- (Bangladesh) Asadul Islam Sakib (against Bhutan)
- (Brunei) Danish Firdaus (against Iraq)
- (Brunei) Wafiq Danish (against Thailand)
- (Lebanon) Mahdi Osseili (against Kuwait)
- (Maldives) Mohamed Aiman Ali (against East Timor)
- (Northern Mariana Islands) Monico Claridades (against South Korea)
- (Northern Mariana Islands) Markus Toves (against South Korea)
- (Qatar) Bassam Eid (against Jordan)
- (Vietnam) Nguyễn Ngọc Chiến (against Syria)

== See also ==
- 2025 AFC U-20 Asian Cup
- 2025 AFC U-17 Asian Cup qualification
