= Mahmoud Al-Hadid =

Jordanian football manager (born 1979)

Personal information
- Full name: Mahmoud Taleb Awad Al-Hadid
- Date of birth: 5 September 1979 (age 47)
- Place of birth: Jordan

Youth career
- Al-Faisaly

Senior career*
| Years | Team | Apps | (Gls) |
- Al-Faisaly
- Al-Ahli
| –2008 | Shabab Al-Ordon | | |

Managerial career
- 2018–2020: Shabab Al-Ordon
- 2021: Al Wehda
- 2021–2022: Al-Faisaly
- 2023–: Shabab Al-Ordon
- * Club domestic league appearances and goals

Mahmoud Taleb Awad Al-Hadid (Arabic: محمود الحديد; born 5 September 1979) is a Jordanian football manager who manages Shabab Al-Ordon.

== Life and career ==
Al-Hadid was born on 5 September 1979 in Jordan. As a youth player, he joined the youth academy of Jordanian side Al-Faisaly. He started his senior career with the club. He played for one season with their senior team. After that, he signed for Jordanian side Al-Ahli. After that, he signed for Jordanian side Shabab Al-Ordon. He retired from professional football in 2008. He obtained a UEFA Pro License. He has been regarded as one of the most prominent Jordanian football managers.

Al-Hadid worked as a youth manager for Jordanian side Shabab Al-Ordon In 2018, he was appointed manager of the club. In 2021, he was appointed manager of Saudi Arabian side Al Wehda. In 2021, he was appointed manager of Jordanian side Al-Faisaly. He helped the club win the 2021 Jordan FA Cup. He was described as "surprised everyone by relying on the false nine" while managing them. In 2023, he returned as manager of Jordanian side Shabab Al-Ordon.
