= Ja'far Samara =

Jordanian footballer

Personal information
- Full name: Ja'far Mohammad Ali Samara
- Date of birth: 8 June 2004 (age 22)
- Place of birth: Al-Turrah, Jordan
- Position: Center-back

Team information
- Current team: Al-Ramtha
- Number: 2

Youth career
- Nujum Al-Ghad Academy
- Al-Ramtha

Senior career*
Years	Team	Apps	(Gls)
2024–	Al-Ramtha	14	(0)

International career^{‡}
2019	Jordan U17	4	(0)
2025–	Jordan U23	7	(0)
- * Club domestic league appearances and goals as of 7 May 2026 ‡ National team caps and goals as of 16 January 2026

Ja'far Mohammad Ali Samara (Arabic: جعفر سمارة; born 8 June 2004) is a Jordanian professional footballer who plays as a center-back for Jordanian Pro League side Al-Ramtha and the Jordan national team.

== International career ==
Samara began his international career with the Jordan under-17 team to take part in 2020 AFC U-16 Championship qualification.

On 16 February 2025, Samara received his first call-up to the Jordan under-23, in preparation for the 2025 WAFF U-23 Championship. On 16 March 2025, he would receive the call-up for the tournament held in Oman.

On 13 November 2025, Samara would receive a call-up from the under-23 squad to the Jordan national football team, after Nizar Al-Rashdan was exempted from the squad ahead of their friendly against Tunisia matchup due to a flu.

On 23 December 2025, Samara was called up to the 2026 AFC U-23 Asian Cup, where he participated in three of the four matches.

== Playing style ==
During his time at Al-Ramtha, Samara has played as a centre-back and as a defensive midfielder.
