= 2012–13 Jordan League =

Jordan League
- Season: 2012–2013
- Champions: Shabab Al-Ordon (second title)
- Relegated: Al-Yarmouk; Shabab Al-Hussein
- AFC Cup: Shabab Al-Ordon; That Ras
- Matches: 132
- Goals: 361 (2.73 per match)
- Top goalscorer: Abdallah Deeb (Al-Wehdat-14 goals)

The 2012–2013 Jordanian Pro League (known as the Al-Manaseer Jordanian Pro League, named after Ziad Al-Manaseer Companies Group for sponsorship reasons) was the 61st season of the top-flight football in Jordan which started on 21 August 2012. and ended on 3 May 2013. Al-Faisaly entered the season as the defending champions.

Shabab Al-Ordon won the second title in its history while Al-Yarmouk and Shabab Al-Hussein were relegated to the Jordan League Division 1 after finishing in the bottom two.

== Teams ==
Jordanian League 2012-2013
| Club | Location | Stadium |
|---|---|---|
| Al-Arabi (Irbid) | Irbid | Al-Hassan Stadium |
| Al-Baqa'a SC | Balqa Governorate | Amman International Stadium |
| Al-Faisaly | Amman | Amman International Stadium |
| That Ras | Karak Governorate | Prince Faisal Stadium |
| Al-Jazeera (Amman) | Amman | Amman International Stadium |
| Al-Ramtha | Ar Ramtha | Prince Hashim Stadium |
| Al-Wahdat | Amman | King Abdullah Stadium |
| Al-Yarmouk | Amman | King Abdullah Stadium |
| Shabab Al-Ordon | Amman | King Abdullah Stadium |
| Al-Sareeh SC | Irbid | Prince Hashim Stadium |
| Shabab Al-Hussein | Amman | Amman International Stadium |
| Manshia Bani Hassan | Mafraq Governorate | Prince Mohammed Stadium |

=== Map ===
Locations of the 2012-2013 Jordan League teams

== League standings ==
| Pos | Team | Pld | W | D | L | GF | GA | GD | Pts | |
|---|---|---|---|---|---|---|---|---|---|---|
| 1 | Shabab Al-Ordon | 22 | 16 | 5 | 1 | 48 | 22 | +26 | 53 | Champions |
| 2 | Al-Wehdat | 22 | 13 | 6 | 3 | 43 | 23 | +20 | 45 | |
| 3 | Al-Arabi | 22 | 12 | 6 | 4 | 33 | 23 | +10 | 42 | |
| 4 | Al-Ramtha | 22 | 12 | 5 | 5 | 46 | 24 | +22 | 41 | |
| 5 | Al-Faisaly | 22 | 11 | 4 | 7 | 36 | 23 | +13 | 37 | |
| 6 | Al-Jazeera | 22 | 7 | 10 | 5 | 25 | 15 | +10 | 31 | |
| 7 | That Ras | 22 | 6 | 8 | 8 | 32 | 35 | −3 | 26 | |
| 8 | Al Baqa'a | 22 | 7 | 4 | 11 | 23 | 31 | −8 | 25 | |
| 9 | Mansheyat Bani Hasan | 22 | 6 | 5 | 11 | 23 | 31 | −8 | 23 | |
| 10 | Al-Sareeh | 22 | 4 | 7 | 11 | 19 | 30 | −11 | 19 | |
| 11 | Al-Yarmouk | 22 | 3 | 6 | 13 | 20 | 44 | −24 | 15 | Relegated |
| 12 | Shabab Al-Hussein | 22 | 1 | 2 | 19 | 13 | 60 | −47 | 5 | Relegated |

Updated to match(es) played on 5 May 2013. Source: RSSSF
Rules for classification: 1) points; 2) goal difference; 3) number of goals scored.
