= Hisham Abdul-Munam =

Jordanian footballer

Personal information
- Date of birth: 18 November 1969 (age 56)
- Place of birth: Russeifa, Jordan
- Position: Attacking midfielder

Youth career
- 1985–1986: Al-Hwari Al-Sha'abiyah
- 1986–1987: Kashafa Al-Rusaifa

Senior career*
Years	Team	Apps	(Gls)
1987–2000	Al-Wehdat		

International career
1986–1987	Jordan U-20		
1988–1991	Jordan U-23		
1992–1996	Jordan	22	(3)

Managerial career
- 2001: Al-Wahda Madaba
- 2001–2004: Al-Wehdat U-19
- 2002: Al-Wehdat (assistant manager)
- 2004–2006: Jordan U-20
- 2007: Al-Karmel
- 2008–2009: Al-Wehdat U-19
- 2009–2010: Shabab Al-Hussein
- 2011: Bani Yas U-19
- 2012: Al-Wehdat
- 2012: Hilal Al-Quds
- 2015-2016: Al-Wehdat
- 2020-2021: Balama
- * Club domestic league appearances and goals

Hisham Abdul-Munam is a retired Jordanian footballer who played for Al-Wehdat SC and the Jordan national football team.

Hisham has an older brother named Jihad, who also played for Al-Wehdat SC and the Jordan national team. Hisham is married and has four children; a daughter named Aseen and three sons Ahmed, Jihad and Ayham.

== Career ==
Hisham retired when he was just 31 years old. A match was held between Al-Faisaly and Al-Wehdat on 6 August 2000 to mark his retirement.

== International goals ==
=== U-23 ===
#	Date	Venue	Opponent	Score	Result	Competition
1	19 September 1991	Riyadh	Saudi Arabia	2-1	Win	Football at the 1992 Summer Olympics – Men's Asian Qualifiers

=== Senior team ===
#	Date	Venue	Opponent	Score	Result	Competition
1	28 August 1992	Amman	Iraq	2-0	Win	Jordan International Tournament
2	30 May 1993	Irbid	Pakistan	3-1	Win	1994 FIFA World Cup qualification
3	9 August 1996	Amman	Pakistan	4-0	Win	1996 AFC Asian Cup qualification

== Honors and Participation in International Tournaments ==
=== In Pan Arab Games ===
- 1992 Pan Arab Games

=== In Arab Nations Cup ===
- 1992 Arab Nations Cup
