= Murad Al-Faluji =

Jordanian footballer (born 2003)

Personal information
- Full name: Murad Araft Mohammad Nayef Al-Faluji
- Date of birth: 27 December 2003 (age 22)
- Place of birth: Amman, Jordan
- Height: 1.93 m (6 ft 4 in)
- Position: Goalkeeper

Team information
- Current team: Al-Hussein
- Number: 12

Youth career
- –2021: Al-Wehdat

Senior career*
Years	Team	Apps	(Gls)
2021–2024	Al-Wehdat		
2024–	Al-Hussein	0	(0)

International career^{‡}
2021	Jordan U18	3	(0)
2022–2023	Jordan U20	10	(0)
2023–	Jordan U23	4	(0)
- * Club domestic league appearances and goals as of 28 January 2026 ‡ National team caps and goals as of 28 January 2026

Murad Araft Mohammad Nayef Al-Faluji (Arabic: مراد الفالوجي; born 27 December 2003) is a Jordanian professional footballer who plays as a goalkeeper for Jordanian Pro League club Al-Hussein.

== Club career ==
=== Al-Wehdat ===
Born in Amman, Al-Faluji began his senior career at Al-Wehdat during the 2021 Jordanian Pro League season. He was seen as among the goalkeepers the club relies upon by the 2023 Jordan Shield Cup, alongside veteran Ahmed Abdel-Sattar.

=== Al-Hussein ===
On 25 July 2024, Al-Faluji joined Al-Hussein for an undisclosed period.

On 4 November 2025, Al-Faluji played a notable role in Al-Hussein's cup win against Al-Karmel when he blocked a shot from Ahmed Khasawneh, leading up to Aref Al-Haj scoring from a counter-attack.

== International career ==
In May 2022, Al-Faluji received a call-up to the Jordan national football team under manager Adnan Hamad, appearing on the bench in a 2–0 victory over India.

On 5 September 2022, Al-Faluji was called up to the Jordan under-20 team to participate in 2023 AFC U-20 Asian Cup qualification. He would go on to make the final roster for the 2023 AFC U-20 Asian Cup, starting in all matches.

On 13 March 2023, Al-Faluji received another call-up to the senior national team for a training camp held in Doha.

On 17 March 2024, Jordan under-23 manager Abdullah Abu Zema called-up Al-Faluji in order to compensate for the absence of Ahmad Al-Juaidi.

On 16 March 2025, Al-Faluji was called up to the under-23 team for the 2025 WAFF U-23 Championship held in Oman. On 24 August 2025, he was called up once again to participate in two friendlies against Bahrain, as well as to participate in 2026 AFC U-23 Asian Cup qualification matches.

On 23 December 2025, Al-Faluji was called up to the 2026 AFC U-23 Asian Cup.

== Personal life ==
In February 2024, Al-Wehdat extended their congratulations to Al-Faluji for getting married.
