= Anthony Khayat =

Footballer (born 2007)

Personal information
- Full name: Anthony Michel Khayat
- Date of birth: 13 February 2007 (age 19)
- Place of birth: Beirut, Lebanon
- Height: 1.73 m (5 ft 8 in)
- Positions: Defender; midfielder

Team information
- Current team: Celta B
- Number: 32

Youth career
- 2016–2025: Fursan Hispania
- 2025–: Celta

Senior career*
Years	Team	Apps	(Gls)
2025–	Celta B	14	(0)

International career^{‡}
2024	United Arab Emirates U20	5	(1)
2025–	United Arab Emirates U23	2	(0)
- * Club domestic league appearances and goals as of 17 April 2026 ‡ National team caps and goals as of 22 March 2025

Anthony Michel Khayat (Arabic: أنطوني ميشيل خياط; born 13 February 2007) is a professional footballer who plays as a defender or midfielder for Spanish club Celta Fortuna. Born in Lebanon, he represents the United Arab Emirates at youth international level.

== Early life ==
Khayat was born in Beirut, Lebanon, on 13 February 2007. He joined the youth setup of Fursan Hispania in Dubai in 2016, where he was coached by former Celta Vigo player Pablo Coira. He participated in tournaments organised by Celta since the age of ten, and had previously trained at the club's facilities in Vigo, but returned to Fursan Hispania because FIFA regulations restricted his international transfer as a minor, as he did not hold European nationality.

== Club career ==
On 17 July 2025, after turning 18, Celta Vigo announced the signing of Khayat from Fursan Hispania on a three-year contract. Although registered with the club's Juvenil A side, he joined the training group of Celta Fortuna, Celta's reserve team competing in the Primera Federación (third tier).

Khayat made his debut for Celta Fortuna on 25 October 2025 against Racing de Ferrol, coming on as a substitute and providing the assist for Álvaro Marín's winning goal in a 2–1 victory. He became the third Celta youth player to make his Primera Federación debut during the 2025–26 season. During the 2025–26 season, Khayat made 14 appearances for Celta Fortuna in Primera Federación, playing 718 minutes. He also made 19 league appearances for the Juvenil A side, scoring four goals.

In May 2026, Khayat suffered an anterior cruciate ligament injury to his left knee during Celta's Copa de Campeones Juvenil quarter-final against Las Palmas. He underwent surgery later that month, with Celta estimating a recovery period of around eight months. The injury ruled him out for the beginning of Celta Fortuna's 2026–27 campaign following the club's promotion to Segunda División.

== International career ==
Born in Lebanon, Khayat has represented the United Arab Emirates at youth level.

He was included in the United Arab Emirates under-20 squad for the 2025 AFC U-20 Asian Cup qualifiers in September 2024. On 21 September, he scored the second goal in the UAE's 3–2 victory over Lebanon U20 in the opening match of the qualification tournament. In March 2025, Khayat was selected for the UAE under-23 squad for the 2025 WAFF U-23 Championship in Oman. He made two appearances during the tournament.

== Career statistics ==
=== Club ===
As of match played 17 April 2026

Appearances and goals by club, season and competition
Club	Season	League			Copa del Rey		Other		Total	
Club	Season	Division	Apps	Goals	Apps	Goals	Apps	Goals	Apps	Goals
Celta Fortuna	2025–26	Primera Federación	14	0	—		0	0	14	0
Celta Fortuna	2026–27	Segunda División	0	0	—		—		0	0
Celta Fortuna	Total		14	0	0	0	0	0	14	0
Career total			14	0	0	0	0	0	14	0
