= Saif Suleiman =

Jordanian footballer

Personal information
- Full name: Saif Khalil Ibrahim Suleiman
- Date of birth: 22 September 2004 (age 22)
- Place of birth: Jordan
- Position: Midfielder

Team information
- Current team: Shabab Al-Ordon
- Number: 6

Youth career
- –2022: Shabab Al-Ordon

Senior career*
Years	Team	Apps	(Gls)
2022–	Shabab Al-Ordon		

International career^{‡}
2025–	Jordan U23	5	(0)
- * Club domestic league appearances and goals as of 25 January 2026 ‡ National team caps and goals as of 16 January 2026

Saif Khalil Ibrahim Suleiman (Arabic: سيف سليمان; born 22 September 2004) is a Jordanian professional footballer who plays as a midfielder for Jordanian Pro League side Shabab Al-Ordon.

== Club career ==
=== Shabab Al-Ordon ===
Suleiman was a part of the Shabab Al-Ordon squad for the 2023 Arab Club Champions Cup, participating in a match against FC Nouadhibou.

== International career ==
On 16 March 2025, Suleiman was called up to the Jordan U-23 team for the 2025 WAFF U-23 Championship held in Oman. On 23 December 2025, Suleiman was called up to the 2026 AFC U-23 Asian Cup, participating in two of the four matches.
