= Shabab Al-Ordon SC =

Jordanian football club

Shabab Al-Ordon
- Full name: Shabab Al-Ordon Club
- Nicknames: أسود غمدان ʾUsūd Ghamdan; Lions of Ghamdan
- Founded: 2002; 24 years ago
- Ground: King Abdullah II Stadium
- Capacity: 13,000
- President: Talal Omran
- Head Coach: Carlos Echeverry
- League: Jordanian Pro League
- 2025–26: Jordanian Pro League, 7th of 10
- Website: Official page
| Home colours | Away colours |

Active departments of Shabab Al-Ordon
- Football Men's: Football Women's

Shabab Al-Ordon Club (Arabic: نادي شباب الأردن, lit. 'Jordan Youth Club') is a Jordanian professional football club based in Amman, that competes in the Jordanian Pro League. The club was established in 2002, but originated from its club Al-Qadisiyah.

== History ==
Shabab Al-Ordon Club Management has played an important role in its success. Furthermore, the greatest achievement of the club was in 2007 in their success in winning AFC Cup. The Red and whites have been popular for twisting and turning Al-Wehdat and Al-Faisaly title races while rarely being involved. in 2004–2007 Shabab were the most threatening, but since then, the form has dropped.

=== 2007 AFC Cup ===
Shabab Al-Ordon qualified for the 2007 AFC Cup, Asia's second-tier club tournament (Jordanian clubs did not pass the licensing requirements to participate in the AFC Champions League and thus were transferred to the AFC Cup). Shabab Al Ordon's continental bow started with a 2–0 victory over Yemen's Al-Saqr in Group A before 1–0 and 2–0 wins over Oman's Muscat and Nejmeh of Lebanon respectively saw the Amman side on maximum points after three games.

2007 AFC Cup winning starting line-up.

The second half of the group stage was not as strong for the Jordanians as an away defeat to Nejmeh followed by a 1–1 draw with Al Saqr in Yemen saw the Lebanese side move into top spot. And it took a 2–1 victory over Muscat in the final group game to see Shabab Al Ordon advance as the best-placed runners-up in the West. Shabab Al Ordon was then pitted against Singaporean opposition in the last eight with Armed Forces. Shabab Al Ordon enjoyed the perfect first leg by seeing off the Singapore side 5–0 in Amman, although complacency threatened to get the better of them in the return leg before a 3–0 defeat saw them progress 5–3 on aggregate. Three Jordanian teams reached the last four with Shabab Al-Ordon avoiding the local derby after being paired with Nejmeh. In their third meeting of the competition Shabab Al Ordon's Odai Al-Saify scored the only goal of the game early on as the Amman side defeated Nejmeh 1–0, before a scoreless draw in the second leg in Beirut secured them a place in the final at the first time of asking. Al Faisaly and Al Wehdat played out a 1–1 draw in their first leg at Amman International Stadium. Some 17,000 spectators turned out for the return leg at the same venue and it was Hassouneh Al-Sheikh who was the hero, scoring the decisive goal in a 2–1 victory.

For the third year in a row, Al Faisaly lined up for the tournament showpiece but, for the first time, they would have to overcome Jordanian opposition in the final to lift the title. After a scoreless first half, Odai Al Saify netted the only goal of the game in the 52nd minute as Shabab Al Ordon, technically the away team, ran out 1–0 winners. Haitham Al-Shboul then cancelled out that away goal by striking early in the second leg to tie the contest at 1–1 on aggregate. But Mustafa Shehdeh equalised on the stroke of half-time and, with no further goals, Al Faisaly's reign as AFC Cup champions was ended as Shabab Al Ordon were crowned kings of the continent.

== Stadium ==
Shabab Al-Ordon plays their home games at King Abdullah II Stadium in Amman. The stadium was constructed in 1998 with a capacity of 13,000 people.

== Identity ==
Shabab Al-Ordon's home kit is all red and white stripes, while their away kit is all black and white stripes.

On 16 July 2026, Shabab Al-Ordon unveiled a new logo.

The previous logo of Shabab Al-Ordon SC

=== Kit suppliers and shirt sponsors ===
| Period | Kit supplier | Shirt sponsor |
|---|---|---|
| 2002–2015 | Adidas | Orange Jordan |
| 2015–2016 | Erreà | Nisc Pure |
| 2016–2017 | Erreà | Burger King |
| 2017–2018 | Jako | None |
| 2018– | Joma | None |

== Current squad ==
As of 14 September 2026

Note: Flags indicate national team as defined under FIFA eligibility rules; some limited exceptions apply. Players may hold more than one non-FIFA nationality.

| No. | Pos. | Nation | Player |
|---|---|---|---|
| 1 | GK | JOR | Salameh Salman |
| 2 | MF | JOR | Yazeed Mahfouz |
| 3 | MF | DOM | Jordy Durán |
| 4 | MF | JOR | Anas Zabout |
| 6 | MF | JOR | Hamza Al-Shamali |
| 7 | FW | JOR | Adham Al-Refaei |
| 8 | MF | JOR | Saif Suleiman |
| 9 | FW | JOR | Mustafa Al-Saifi |
| 10 | FW | JOR | Ayham Hisham |
| 11 | FW | JOR | Moaz Al-Alaimat |
| 14 | DF | JOR | Amer Al-Majdoubah (captain) |
| 16 | MF | JOR | Qusai Tannous |
| 17 | FW | JOR | Shaher Shelbaieh |
| 19 | DF | JOR | Mohammad Abu Ghoush |
| 21 | MF | JOR | Rashid Al-Shroqi |
| 22 | GK | JOR | Noureddine Al-Torman |
| 23 | MF | JOR | Anas Zara |
| 25 | MF | JOR | Abdelmajed Khresat |
| 26 | MF | JOR | Ahmad Khaled |
| 27 | MF | TUN | Iyed Belgacem |

| No. | Pos. | Nation | Player |
|---|---|---|---|
| 28 | FW | ECU | Maikel Caicedo |
| 29 | DF | ECU | Saúl Castro |
| 33 | DF | JOR | Salem Al-Ajalin |
| 55 | FW | JOR | Mohammad Abu Arqob |
| 77 | MF | JOR | Mohamad Al-Absi |
| 81 | MF | JOR | Abdulrahman Abu Assaf |
| 88 | MF | JOR | Fayez Draghmeh |
| 90 | FW | JOR | Khaldoon Sabra |
| 99 | GK | JOR | Waleed Issam |
| — | DF | JOR | Ghassan Abu Hassan |
| — | DF | JOR | Hassan Holwah |
| — | MF | JOR | Ismail Freihat |
| — | DF | PLE | Ali Rabaei |
| — | DF | JOR | Ibrahim Nofal |
| — | MF | JOR | Abdulrahman Abu Assaf |
| — | FW | JOR | Abdallah Al-Shodefat |
| — | DF | JOR | Abdulrahim Al-Mashaqbah |
| — | FW | JOR | Abdallah Khresat |
| — | MF | JOR | Ahmad Al-Mahasiri |
| — | | JOR | Mohammad Nidal Qaisi |

== Team staff ==
As of 21 July 2026

| Position | Staff |
|---|---|
| Head coach | (Colombia) (Spain) Carlos Echeverry |
| Assistant coach | (Jordan) Mohammad Al-Bahnsi |
| Goalkeeper coach | (Jordan) Waleed Mikhail |
| Fitness coach | (Ecuador) Bryan Espinoza |
| Team manager | (Jordan) Wael Al-Banna |
| Performance analyst | (Jordan) Mohammad Al-Souri |
| Team doctor | (Jordan) Dr. Nizar Al-Bashtawi |
| Team therapist | (Jordan) Mohammad Al-Dabbas |
| Team therapist | (Jordan) Nidal Al-Tamari |
| Media coordinator | (Jordan) Hossam Al-Sawafdat |

=== Managerial history ===
| Name | From | To |
|---|---|---|
| (Jordan) Issa Al-Turk | 2004 | 2005 |
| (Syria) Nizar Mahrous | 2005 | 2007 |
| (Jordan) Jamal Mahmoud | 2007 | 2008 |
| (Egypt) Mohammad Omar | 2008 | 2008 |
| (Iraq) Nazar Ashraf | 2008 | 2009 |
| (Jordan) Jamal Abu Abed | 2009 | 2009 |
| (Croatia) Dragan Talajić | 2009 | 2010 |
| (Romania) Aristica Cioaba | 2010 | 2010 |
| (Belgium) Tom Saintfiet | 2010 | 2011 |
| (Syria) Emad Dahbour | 2011 | 2011 |
| (Egypt) Alaa Nabiel | 2011 | 2012 |
| (Romania) Florin Motroc | 2012 | 2013 |
| (Syria) Maher Bahri | 2013 | 2013 |
| (Jordan) Ahmed Abdel-Qader | 2013 | 2013 |
| (Romania) Eugen Moldovan | 2013 | 2014 |
| (Saudi Arabia) Ali Kmeikh | 2014 | 2014 |
| (Jordan) Mohamed Al-Yamani | 2014 | 2015 |
| (Jordan) Jamal Mahmoud | 2015 | 2017 |
| (Jordan) Issa Al-Turk | 2017 | 2018 |
| (Portugal) Zé Nando | 2018 | 2019 |
| (Jordan) Mahmoud Al-Hadid | 2019 | 2020 |
| (Jordan) Waseem Al-Bzour | 2020 | 2022 |
| (Jordan) Mahmoud Al-Hadid | 2022 | 2024 |
| (Jordan) Mahmoud Shelbaieh | 2024 | 2024 |
| (Jordan) Raed Assaf | 2024 | 2025 |
| (Jordan) Issa Al-Turk | 2025 | 2026 |
| (Jordan) Mahmoud Shelbaieh | 2026 | 2026 |
| (Colombia) (Spain) Carlos Echeverry | 2026 | |

== Honours ==
| Type | Competition | Titles | Seasons |
|---|---|---|---|
| Domestic | Premier League | 2 | 2005–06, 2012–13 |
| Domestic | FA Cup | 2 | 2005–06, 2006–07 |
| Domestic | FA Shield | 2 | 2007, 2016 |
| Domestic | Super Cup | 2 | 2007, 2013 |
| Continental | AFC Cup | 1 | 2007 |
| Total | | 9 | |

== Recent seasons ==
The table below chronicles the achievements of Shabab Al-Ordon in various competitions since 2004.

- P = Played
- W = Games won
- D = Games drawn
- L = Games lost
- F = Goals scored
- A = Goals against
- Pts = Points
- Pos = Final position

- W = Champion
- RU = Final (Runner-up)
- SF = Semi-finals
- QF = Quarter-finals
- R16/R32 = Round of 16, Round of 32, etc.
- GS =Group stage

| Champions | Runners-up | 3rd Place or Losing semi-finalists |

| Season | Division | P | W | D | L | F | A | Pts | Pos | FA Cup | FA Shield | Competition | Result | Competition | Result |
| Season | League | | | | | | | | | FA Cup | FA Shield | AFC Competitions | | Other | |
|---|---|---|---|---|---|---|---|---|---|---|---|---|---|---|---|
| 2004–05 | Premier League | 18 | 8 | 5 | 5 | 41 | 27 | 29 | 4th | QF | SF | — | — | — | — |
| 2005–06 | Premier League | 18 | 13 | 3 | 2 | 41 | 19 | 42 | 1st | W | GS | — | — | Arab Champions League | R32 |
| 2006–07 | Premier League | 18 | 9 | 5 | 4 | 35 | 19 | 32 | 4th | W | GS | AFC Cup | W | Jordan Super Cup Arab Champions League | RU R16 |
| 2007–08 | Premier League | 18 | 7 | 8 | 3 | 27 | 15 | 29 | 3rd | RU | W | AFC Cup | GS | Jordan Super Cup | W |
| 2008–09 | Premier League | 18 | 13 | 2 | 3 | 37 | 16 | 41 | 2nd | RU | GS | — | — | Arab Champions League | R32 |
| 2009–10 | Premier League | 22 | 12 | 8 | 2 | 35 | 20 | 44 | 2nd | QF | GS | AFC Cup | R16 | Jordan Super Cup | RU |
| 2010–11 | Premier League | 20 | 9 | 6 | 5 | 38 | 26 | 33 | 3rd | R16 | GS | — | — | — | — |
| 2011–12 | Premier League | 22 | 7 | 7 | 8 | 26 | 25 | 28 | 5th | SF | RU | — | — | — | — |
| 2012–13 | Premier League | 22 | 16 | 5 | 1 | 48 | 22 | 53 | 1st | SF | Not held | — | — | UAFA Club Cup | GS |
| 2013–14 | Premier League | 22 | 7 | 5 | 10 | 32 | 42 | 26 | 9th | SF | Not held | AFC Cup | GS | Jordan Super Cup | W |
| 2014–15 | Premier League | 22 | 6 | 8 | 8 | 16 | 23 | 26 | 10th | GS | Not held | — | — | — | — |
| 2015–16 | Premier League | 22 | 9 | 6 | 7 | 28 | 25 | 33 | 5th | RU | Not held | — | — | — | — |
| 2016–17 | Premier League | 22 | 7 | 3 | 12 | 27 | 31 | 24 | 8th | GS | W | — | — | — | — |
| 2017–18 | Premier League | 22 | 10 | 7 | 5 | 30 | 22 | 37 | 5th | RU | GS | — | — | — | — |
| 2018–19 | Premier League | 22 | 11 | 6 | 5 | 30 | 21 | 39 | 4th | R16 | Not held | — | — | — | — |
| 2020 | Premier League | 22 | 5 | 7 | 10 | 29 | 38 | 22 | 9th | Not held | SF | — | — | UAFA Club Cup | R16 |
| 2021 | Premier League | 22 | 8 | 9 | 5 | 28 | 22 | 33 | 6th | R16 | GS | — | — | — | — |
| 2022 | Premier League | 22 | 10 | 3 | 9 | 32 | 29 | 33 | 4th | R16 | SF | — | — | — | — |
| 2023–24 | Premier League | 22 | 7 | 1 | 14 | 21 | 36 | 22 | 8th | SF | 10th | — | — | — | — |
| 2024–25 | Premier League | 22 | 7 | 4 | 11 | 28 | 33 | 25 | 8th | R16 | GS | — | — | — | — |
| 2025–26 | Premier League | 27 | 7 | 8 | 12 | 22 | 37 | 29 | 7th | QF | 7th | — | — | — | — |
