= Anthony Pinto =

Hong Kong footballer (born 2006)

Personal information
- Full name: Anthony Francis Pinto
- Date of birth: 23 February 2006 (age 20)
- Place of birth: Hong Kong
- Positions: Right back; right winger

Youth career
- 2017–2018: Happy Valley
- 2019–2024: Bolton Wanderers

Senior career*
Years	Team	Apps	(Gls)
2024–	Loughborough Students		

International career^{‡}
2024	Hong Kong U-20	2	(1)
2025–	Hong Kong U-22	1	(0)
2025–	Hong Kong U-23	6	(1)
2024	Hong Kong	1	(1)
- * Club domestic league appearances and goals as of 30 June 2024 ‡ National team caps and goals as of 23 September 2026

Anthony Francis Pinto (Chinese: 杜俊暉; born 23 February 2006) is a Hong Kong professional footballer who plays as a right back or a right winger for Loughborough Students and the Hong Kong national team.

== Club career ==
=== Happy Valley ===
Born in Hong Kong to a Portuguese father and a Hong Kongese mother, Pinto came from the youth system of Hong Kong club Happy Valley.

=== Bolton Wanderers U18 ===
Pinto joined English club Bolton Wanderers U18 in 2021. He has played in the FA Youth Cup.

== International career ==
=== Youth ===
In December 2023, Pinto was selected into the 29-man training squad of Hong Kong U18.

Pinto was named in the 23-man squad for the 2025 AFC U20 qualifiers in which scored one of the two goals against Singapore in their penultimate match.

=== Senior ===
On 1 June 2024, Pinto was selected into the 23-man final squad of Hong Kong for the first time. On 6 June 2024, Pinto made his international debut for Hong Kong in a 2026 FIFA World Cup qualifier against Iran. He scored in the 59th minute, two minutes after coming off the bench, to make the score 2–3. However, the game ended with Iran's 4–2 victory.

== Career statistics ==
=== International ===
As of matches last played 6 June 2024

National team	Year	Apps	Goals
Hong Kong	2024	1	1
Total		1	1

#	Date	Venue	Opponent	Result	Competition
1	6 June 2024	Hong Kong Stadium, So Kon Po, Hong Kong	Iran	2–4	2026 FIFA World Cup qualification – AFC second round

=== International goals ===
No.	Date	Venue	Opponent	Score	Result	Competition
1.	6 June 2024	Hong Kong Stadium, So Kon Po, Hong Kong	Iran	2–4	2–4	2026 FIFA World Cup qualification – AFC second round
