= Mahmoud Zbib =

Lebanese footballer (born 2004)

Personal information
- Full name: Mahmoud Ali Zbib
- Date of birth: 29 February 2004 (age 22)
- Place of birth: Sarafand, Lebanon
- Height: 1.78 m (5 ft 10 in)
- Position: Midfielder

Team information
- Current team: Ahed
- Number: 10

Youth career
- 2015–2017: Pro Sports
- 2017–2024: Ahed

Senior career*
Years	Team	Apps	(Gls)
2021–	Ahed	57	(14)

International career^{‡}
2019	Lebanon U16	3	(2)
2022	Lebanon U20	1	(0)
2023–2026	Lebanon U23	8	(1)
2026–	Lebanon	3	(0)
- * Club domestic league appearances and goals as of 13 September 2026 ‡ National team caps and goals as of 13 November 2026

Mahmoud Ali Zbib (Arabic: محمود علي زبيب; born 29 February 2004) is a Lebanese footballer who plays as a midfielder for Lebanese Premier League club Ahed and the Lebanon national team.

== Early life ==
Born in Sarafand, Zbib grew up in the nearby village of Tefahta. He began playing football aged nine in his local village.

== Club career ==
Zbib started his youth career at Pro Sports in Nabatieh, before joining Ahed's youth sector after two years in 2017. He received his first senior call up in 2020, playing three games during the 2020–21 season.

During the 2024–25 season, Zbib became a regular for Ahed. In April 2025, Zbib suffered an injury to his thigh muscle, which kept him out of action for three weeks, and suffered another setback in May for three further weeks, returning from injury in June. He suffered another injury in November 2025.

== International career ==
Zbib is a Lebanon youth international. He played for the under-16s at the 2020 AFC U-16 Championship qualification, for the under-20s at the 2022 Arab Cup U-20 and 2023 AFC U-20 Asian Cup qualification, and for the under-23s at the 2025 WAFF U-23 Championship, as team captain, and 2026 AFC U-23 Asian Cup, also as captain.

Zbib received his first call-up to the Lebanon national team from head coach Madjid Bougherra in September 2026, ahead of friendly matches against the Maldives and Kyrgyzstan in October. He made his debut on 1 October, in a 6–0 win against the Maldives.

== Style of play ==
Zbib plays as a midfielder.

== Personal life ==
Zbib has one older brother and one older sister. He studied business management at the Lebanese International University in Sidon.

== Career statistics ==
=== Club ===
As of match played 13 September 2026

Appearances and goals by club, season and competition
Club	Season	League			Lebanon Cup		League cup (Note: Includes Lebanese Federation Cup)		Continental		Other		Total	
Club	Season	Division	Apps	Goals	Apps	Goals	Apps	Goals	Apps	Goals	Apps	Goals	Apps	Goals
Ahed	2020–21	Lebanese Premier League	3	0	—		—		—		—		3	0
Ahed	2021–22	Lebanese Premier League	1	1	—		—		—		—		1	1
Ahed	2022–23	Lebanese Premier League	1	0	2	0	—		—		—		3	0
Ahed	2023–24	Lebanese Premier League	20	2	3	0	3	0	2 (Note: Appearances in AFC Cup)	0	1 (Note: Appearance in Lebanese Super Cup)	0	29	2
Ahed	2024–25	Lebanese Premier League	18	8	—		—		—		—		18	8
Ahed	2025–26	Lebanese Premier League	14	3	1	0	—		—		2 (Note: Appearances in National Solidarity Tournament)	2	17	5
Ahed	2026–27	Lebanese Premier League	0	0	1	0	—		—		—		1	0
Ahed	Total		57	14	7	0	3	0	2	0	3	2	72	16
Career total			57	14	7	0	3	0	2	0	3	2	72	16

=== International ===
As of match played 13 November 2026

Appearances and goals by national team and year
National team	Year	Apps	Goals
Lebanon	2026	3	0
Total		3	0

== Honours ==
Ahed

- Lebanese Premier League: 2021–22, 2022–23
- Lebanese Federation Cup: 2023
