= Baker Kalbouneh =

Jordanian footballer (born 2003)

Personal information
- Birth name: Baker Kamal Mohmmad Walid Kalbouneh
- Date of birth: August 14, 2003 (age 23)
- Place of birth: Amman, Jordan
- Height: 1.77 m (5 ft 9 1/2 in)
- Position: Striker

Team information
- Current team: Al-Arabi

Youth career
- 2012–2015: Al-Wehdat
- 2017–2019: Jordan Knights
- 2019–2021: Al-Jazeera

Senior career*
Years	Team	Apps	(Gls)
2022–2024	Al-Jazeera		
2024–2025	Al-Faisaly	21	(0)
2025–2026	Al-Wehdat	10	(1)
2026–	Al-Arabi	0	(0)

International career^{‡}
2021	Jordan U18	3	(0)
2022–2023	Jordan U20	8	(4)
2023–	Jordan U23	12	(6)
- * Club domestic league appearances and goals as of 19 July 2026 ‡ National team caps and goals as of 16 January 2026

Baker Kamal Mohmmad Walid Kalbouneh (Arabic: بَكْر كَمَال مُحَمَّد وَلِيد كَلْبُونَة; born 14 August 2003) is a Jordanian professional footballer who plays as a striker for Jordanian Pro League side Al-Arabi.

== Club career ==
=== Early life and career ===
Kalbouneh began his career at Al-Wehdat when he was 10 years old. He left the club and departed to the United Kingdom to study English, and then traveled to Australia to study another year of English. Upon his return to Jordan, then joined the Jordan Knights academy. He later joined Al-Jazeera's youth ranks until late 2021.

=== Al-Jazeera ===
Kalbouneh signed his first professional contract with Al-Jazeera on 1 January 2022. He was a contributor to their squad for the 2022 Jordanian Pro League season. He was linked with Al-Wehdat by the end of the season, as he sought to play at a higher level than the Jordanian First Division League upon Al-Jazeera's relegation. However, he stayed for the 2023 Jordanian First Division League season, where he ended as the top scorer of the league and promoting the club in the process.

=== Al-Faisaly ===
On 8 January 2024, Kalbouneh signed with Jordanian club Al-Faisaly during the 2023–24 Jordanian Pro League season, signing with the club for a season and a half.

His previous club, Al-Jazeera, demanded to Al-Faisaly to pay 20 thousand dinars as a sponsorship for the player, for a period of 4 years.

Kalbouneh was rumoured to join newly promoted Botola Pro club KAC Marrakech during the 2025 summer transfer window. However, the move never materialized.

=== Al-Wehdat ===
On 14 August 2025, Kalbouneh joined Al-Wehdat on a one-year contract during deadline day. He made his debut against his former club Al-Faisaly, where he sustained a shoulder injury and sidelining him for a period of three months. On 20 January 2026, he scored his first league goal for the club in a 4–2 win over Al-Baqa'a.

== International career ==
Kalbouneh was called up to various Jordanian youth national teams during his career. During the 2023 AFC U-20 Asian Cup, Kalbouneh found himself sent off after five seconds into the match, after a head-high tackle was made to Tajikistan U-20 player Mekhrubon Karimov. He was subsequently suspended for two matches by the AFC as a result of the red card.

On 19 March 2024, Kalboueh was called up to the Jordan national under-23 football team for the 2024 WAFF U-23 Championship. He also participated in the 2024 AFC U-23 Asian Cup.

Kalbouneh participated in the 2025 WAFF U-23 Championship, where he was able to lead Jordan to the runners-up position by scoring four goals, becoming the top scorer of the competition as a result. On 23 December 2025, Kalbouneh was called up to the 2026 AFC U-23 Asian Cup, participating in two of the four matches.

== Personal life ==
In addition to being a footballer, Kalbouneh is noted for being an author and screenwriter.
