= Ayham Hisham =

Jordanian footballer

Personal information
- Full name: Ayham Hisham Abdel Mon'em Mohammad
- Date of birth: 14 August 2004 (age 22)
- Place of birth: Zarqa, Jordan
- Position: Left winger

Team information
- Current team: Shabab Al-Ordon
- Number: 7

Youth career
- Amman FC
- –2021: Shabab Al-Ordon

Senior career*
Years	Team	Apps	(Gls)
2021–	Shabab Al-Ordon		

International career^{‡}
2019	Jordan U15		
2019	Jordan U16		
2025–	Jordan U23	1	(0)
- * Club domestic league appearances and goals as of 3 May 2025 ‡ National team caps and goals as of 25 March 2025

Ayham Hisham Abdel Mon'em Mohammad (Arabic: أيهم هشام عبد المنعم محمد; born 14 August 2004) is a Jordanian professional footballer who plays as a left-winger for Jordanian Pro League side Shabab Al-Ordon.

== Club career ==
=== Early career ===
Born in Zarqa, Hisham began his career at Amman FC, before joining Shabab Al-Ordon.

=== Shabab Al-Ordon ===
He made his senior debut for Shabab Al-Ordon in 2021 with manager Waseem Al-Bzour giving him an opportunity at the time.

During the 2024–25 Jordanian Pro League, Hisham contributed to Shabab Al-Ordon's survival by registering a goal against Moghayer Al-Sarhan.

== International career ==
Hisham participated with Jordan U-15 at the 2019 WAFF U-15 Championship, registering a goal in the tournament. He was the called up to the Jordan U-16's for the 2020 AFC U-16 Championship qualification.

On 2 January 2025, Hisham was called up to the Jordan national football team for a camp held in Amman. Hisham was called up once again to the national team to participate in a training camp held in Doha.

== Playing style ==
Hisham is influenced by former Jordan national football team player Yousef Al-Naber.

== Personal life ==
Ayham is the son of former international footballer Hisham Abdul-Munam He also has three siblings, Aseem, Ahmed, and Jihad.
