= Hoàng Minh Tiến =

Vietnamese footballer (born 2005)

Personal information
- Full name: Hoàng Minh Tiến
- Date of birth: 23 March 2005 (age 21)
- Place of birth: Hà Nam, Vietnam
- Height: 1.75 m (5 ft 9 in)
- Positions: Striker; winger

Youth career
- –2024: Hoàng Anh Gia Lai

Senior career*
Years	Team	Apps	(Gls)
2022–2025	Hoàng Anh Gia Lai	4	(0)
2022–2024	→ Kon Tum (loan)	24	(8)
2024–2025	→ Long An (loan)	5	(0)
2025	→ Hồ Chí Minh City Youth (loan)	1	(0)

International career^{‡}
2023–2025	Vietnam U20	10	(2)
- * Club domestic league appearances and goals as of 15 June 2025 ‡ National team caps and goals as of 29 September 2024

Hoàng Minh Tiến (born 23 March 2005) is a retired Vietnamese footballer who played as a forward.

== Club career ==
Born in Hà Nam, Minh Tiến was formed at the Hoàng Anh Gia Lai Academy.

In 2022, Minh Tiến joined Kon Tum on loan. After good performances with the team, he returned to Hoàng Anh Gia Lai in 2023 and integrated the first team. After a few months, he was loaned again to Kon Tum. In the last gameday of the 2023 Vietnamese Third League against Phú Yến, he scored a goal to help Kon Tum win the game, thus gained the club a promotion to the 2024 Vietnamese Second League.

In October 2024, Minh Tiến was loaned to V.League 2 club Long An for one season.

On 19 November 2025, while being on a loan spell at Hồ Chí Minh City Youth, Minh Tiến announced his retirement at the age of 20 for personal reasons.

== International career ==
In March 2022, Minh Tiến participated in Vietnam U17's training camp in Germany. After the training camp ended, he was one of the two players selected by the staff of Eintracht Frankfurt to stay and train with the team for one more week.

In February 2023, Minh Tiến was called up to the Vietnam U20 team for the 2023 AFC U-20 Championship. He appeared in two group stage games as a substitute but didn't score any goals as Vietnam failed to qualify to the knockout stage of the tournament.

In August 2023, Minh Tiến was named in Vietnam U23's preliminary squad for the 2023 AFF U-23 Championship but didn't feature in the final cut.
