= 2025 WAFF U-23 Championship =

WAFF U-23 Championship 2025
بطولة غرب آسيا تحت 23 عاما بطولة غرب آسيا للمنتخبات الأولمبية عمان 2025

Tournament details
- Host country: Oman
- Dates: 19–25 March
- Teams: 8 (from 1 sub-confederation)
- Venue: 2 (in 2 host cities)

Final positions
- Champions: Oman (1st title)
- Runners-up: Jordan

Tournament statistics
- Matches played: 12
- Goals scored: 26 (2.17 per match)
- Top scorer(s): (Jordan) Baker Kalbouneh (4 goals)

The 2025 WAFF U-23 Championship (Arabic: بطولة غرب آسيا تحت 23 عاما 2025) was the sixth edition of the WAFF U-23 Championship, the annual international age-restricted football championship organised by West Asian Football Federation (WAFF) for the men's under-23 national teams of West Asia. The tournament was hosted by Oman from 19 to 25 March 2025, with eight teams competing for the title. Only players born on or after 1 January 2002 are eligible to participate.

South Korea were the defending champions but could not defend their title as this edition, open only to WAFF members, did not extend invitations to non-member teams. Oman captured the first title in this age level, beating Jordan 3–1 in the final.

== Teams ==
=== Participating teams ===
A total of 8 (out of 12) WAFF members entered the tournament. Three teams returned from last year's edition, while the other five, absent in the previous tournament, made their comeback this time.

Team	App.	Last	Previous best performance
Bahrain	4th	2022	Group stage (2015, 2021, 2022)
Jordan	5th	2024	Champions (2021)
Kuwait	2nd	2021	Group stage (2021)
Lebanon	4th	2023	Group stage (2021, 2022, 2023)
Oman	5th	2023	Semi-finals (2023), Fourth place (2022)
Saudi Arabia	5th	2024	Champions (2022)
Syria	5th	2023	Runners-up (2015)
United Arab Emirates	5th	2024	Group stage (2015, 2021, 2023), Eighth place (2024)

Did not enter

Iraq	Palestine
Qatar	Yemen

=== Draw ===
The draw was held on 25 February 2025, 12:00 AST in Amman. The eight teams were divided into four groups, each consisting of two teams.

The draw resulted in the following ties:

Group A
Pos	Team
A1	Oman (H)
A2	Saudi Arabia

Group B
Pos	Team
B1	Bahrain
B2	United Arab Emirates

Group C
Pos	Team
C1	Syria
C2	Lebanon

Group D
Pos	Team
D1	Jordan
D2	Kuwait

== Venues ==
Two stadiums across the Muscat Governorate were chosen as the venues for the tournament.

2025 WAFF U-23 Championship is located in Oman	Muscat	
2025 WAFF U-23 Championship is located in Oman	Sultan Qaboos Sports Complex	Al-Seeb Stadium
2025 WAFF U-23 Championship is located in Oman	Capacity: 34,000	Capacity: 14,000

== Bracket ==
5th place match
Kuwait	0
Saudi Arabia	2
7th place match
Lebanon	0
United Arab Emirates	3

5th–8th place semifinals
Kuwait	1
Lebanon	0
United Arab Emirates	0
Saudi Arabia	2

Group stage
D1	Jordan	2
D2	Kuwait	0
C1	Syria (p)	2 (4)
C2	Lebanon	2 (2)
B1	Bahrain	2
B2	United Arab Emirates	1
A1	Oman	1
A2	Saudi Arabia	0

Semifinals
Jordan	1
Syria	0
Bahrain	0
Oman	2

Final
Jordan	1
Oman	3
3rd place match
Syria	1
Bahrain	0

== Matches ==
All times are local, GST (UTC+4)

=== Group stage ===
19 March 2025
20:23

Jordan	2–0	Kuwait
Kalbouneh 45+3', 53'	Report

Sultan Qaboos Sports Complex, Muscat

19 March 2025
23:30

Syria	2–2	Lebanon
H. Dahan 51', 54' (pen.)	Report	Zbib 7'; El Fadl 9'
Penalties
H. Dahan (penalty scored); Rahal (penalty scored); Al-Hejjeh (penalty scored); Al-Arjeh (penalty scored)	4–2	(penalty scored) Zbib; (penalty missed) Mannaa; (penalty scored) Bahlawan; (penalty missed) Kaawar

Sultan Qaboos Sports Complex, Muscat

19 March 2025
20:30

Bahrain	2–1	United Arab Emirates
Ebrahim 23'; Al-Khayyat 90+1' (pen.)	Report	Ndiaye 1'

Al-Seeb Stadium, Al-Seeb

19 March 2025
23:30

Oman	1–0	Saudi Arabia
Al-Marzouq 80'	Report

Al-Seeb Stadium, Al-Seeb

=== 5th–8th place semifinals ===
22 March 2025
20:30

Kuwait	1–0	Lebanon
Al-Rashidi 54' (pen.)

Sultan Qaboos Sports Complex, Muscat

22 March 2025
20:30

United Arab Emirates	0–2	Saudi Arabia
		Matuq 16'; Al-Nemer 44' (pen.)

Al-Seeb Stadium, Al-Seeb

=== Semifinals ===
22 March 2025
23:30

Jordan	1–0	Syria
Kalbouneh 3'

Sultan Qaboos Sports Complex, Muscat

22 March 2025
23:30

Bahrain	0–2	Oman
		Al-Marzouq 53'; Bait Rabie 60'

Al-Seeb Stadium, Al-Seeb

=== 7th place match ===
25 March 2025
20:30

Lebanon	0–3	United Arab Emirates
		Ndiaye 7'; Khalfan 58'; Mohamed 90+4'

Al-Seeb Stadium, Seeb

=== 5th place match ===
25 March 2025
23:30

Kuwait	0–2	Saudi Arabia
		Al-Zubaidi 45'; Al-Hassan 54'

Al-Seeb Stadium, Seeb

=== Third place match ===
25 March 2025
20:45

Syria	1–0	Bahrain
A. Dahan 23'

Sultan Qaboos Sports Complex, Muscat

=== Final ===
25 March 2025
23:45

Jordan	1–3	Oman
Kalbouneh 74'		Al-Marzouq 44'; Bait Rabie 87'; Al-Mashaikhi 90+4'

Sultan Qaboos Sports Complex, Muscat

== Goalscorers ==
There were 26 goals scored in 12 matches, for an average of 2.17 goals per match.

4 goals

- (Jordan) Baker Kalbouneh

3 goals

- (Oman) Sultan Al-Marzouq

2 goals

- (Oman) Turki Bait Rabie
- (Syria) Hasan Dahan
- (United Arab Emirates) Junior Ndiaye

1 goal

- (Bahrain) Abdulrahman Al-Khayyat
- (Bahrain) Saood Ebrahim
- (Kuwait) Abdulrahman Al-Rashidi
- (Lebanon) Ali El Fadl
- (Lebanon) Mahmoud Zbib
- (Oman) Ahad Al-Mashaikhi
- (Saudi Arabia) Abbas Al-Hassan
- (Saudi Arabia) Meshari Al-Nemer
- (Saudi Arabia) Abdullah Matuq
- (Saudi Arabia) Yaseen Al-Zubaidi
- (Syria) Anas Dahan
- (United Arab Emirates) Eisa Khalfan
- (United Arab Emirates) Sultan Mohamed
